= James George Barbadoes =

American community leader and abolitionist

- Born: c. 1796; Boston, Massachusetts
- Died: June 22, 1841; Jamaica
- Occupation: Hairdresser
- Known for: African American Leader

James George Barbadoes (c. 1796–June 22, 1841) was an African-American, community leader, and abolitionist in Boston, Massachusetts in the early 19th century. Dedicated to improving the lives of African-American people at the local level, as well as the national level.

== Family History ==
=== Grandparents ===
James G. Barbadoes' grandfather, Quawk Abel Barbadoes (xxxx-1757), perhaps from Barbados, was enslaved by John Simonds (1729–1812) Lexington, Massachusetts. Abel and Kate were "received into the church" on April 19, 1754, in Lexington, Massachusetts. Quawk died three years later. They had three children: Isaac Barbadoes (1755–1777), who died in service to his country at the Battle of Saratoga, 15th Massachusetts Regiment, Mercy Barbadoes (1755-xxxx), and Abel Barbadoes (1756–1817).

=== Parents ===
James G. Barbadoes' father, Abel Barbadoes (1756–1817), was born in Lexington, Massachusetts, and his mother, Chloe Holloway (1759–1843), was born in Hollowell, Maine. Abel and Chloe were married on September 27, 1782, at the First Baptist Church in Boston, Massachusetts. They had nine children: Abel Barbadoes (1785–1820), Mary Barbadoes (1790–1859) married Charles Elsbury (1790-xxxx), Clarissa Ann Barbadoes (1795-xxxx) married Coffin Pitts (1788–1871), Robert H. Barbadoes (1799-xxxx), Catherine L. Barbadoes (1802–1888), Isaac Barbadoes (1805–1873) married Susan Bensen (1812–1875).

The 1798 Federal Dwellings Tax showed Abel and Chloe Barbadoes and their family living at the rear of 19 Belknap Street on the north slope of Beacon Hill before the filling process was completed on the south side by 1805. This should lay to rest the notion that the African American community on the north slope "developed as servant quarters for blacks employed by wealthy Beacon Hill families," for it preceded the lion's share of development of the affluent part of Beacon Hill, considering the intervening embargoes and War of 1812, by more than two decades.

=== Wives and Children ===
James G. Barbadoes married his first wife, Almira Long, on May 28, 1818, in Boston, Massachusetts. He married his second wife, Mary Ann Willis (1803–1828), on October 14, 1821, in the Second Congregational Church Dorchester, Massachusetts. They had four children: Mary Ann Barbadoes (1822–1858) married Osmore Lew Freeman (1820–1905) grandson of Barzillai Lew, James George Barbadoes Jr. (1823-1823), Frederick G. Barbadoes (1825–1899) married Rebecca A. Cowes (1836-xxxx), James George Barbadoes Jr. (1826–1841). He married his third wife, Rebecca Brint (1802–1874), on December 22, 1829, in Boston, Massachusetts. They had seven children: James A. Barbadoes (1831–1832), William G. Barbadoes (1832-1832), Rebecca B. Barbadoes (1833–1921), Garrison K. Barbadoes (1834-xxxx), Jeanette Pier Barbadoes (1836–1915) married Lewis H. Williams (1845-xxxx), Elizar S. Barbadoes (1838-xxxx), Emeline / Evelyne Barbadoes (1839-xxx) married Horace Wycoff Fleet (1849-xxx).

== Community and Abolition Activities ==
=== Prince Hall Freemasonry ===
African Lodge #1

Before 1775, Prince Hall and fourteen other free black men petitioned for admittance to the white Grand Lodge of Massachusetts and were turned down. Having been rejected by colonial Freemasonries, Hall and the others sought and were initiated into the Masonry by members of the Grand Lodge of Ireland on March 6, 1775. African Lodge #1 was established, and Hall was named Grand Master.

African Lodge #459

In 1784, the African Lodge #1 applied to and received a charter from the Premier Grand Lodge of England and was renamed African Lodge #459. In 1827, the African Lodge #459 declared its independence from the Grand Lodge of England and became the Prince Hall Freemasonry.

Prominent African Lodge #459 Members:

- Isaac Barbadoes, Tailor
- James G. Barbadoes, Hairdresser
- Thomas Dalton, Bootblack, husband of Lucy Lew, son-in-law of Barzillai Lew
- Aaron Gaul, Sawyer
- John T. Hilton, Hairdresser
- Peter Lew, son of Barzillai Lew
- Walker Lewis, Hairdresser
- David Walker, Clothing Dealer

=== Massachusetts General Colored Association ===
In 1826, several members of the African Lodge #459 Prince Hall Freemasonry in Boston, Massachusetts, including James G. Barbadoes, met and established the Massachusetts General Colored Association "to promote the welfare of the race by working for the destruction of slavery." The Association was an early supporter of William Lloyd Garrison. Association members were also active in organizations to further their objectives, such as the African Society, the Abiel Smith School, and the African Meeting House.

The organization was especially concerned with the following Issues:

- Abolishing discriminatory Massachusetts laws
- Integrating public schools and accommodations
- Abolishing the prohibition of inter-racial marriages
- Abolishing slavery in the South
- Uplifting African Americans through education and religion

Elected Officers:

- Thomas Dalton, President
- William G. Nell, Vice President
- James G. Barbadoes, Secretary

Other Founding Members included:

Frederick Brimley; Thomas Cole; Hosea Easton; Joshua Easton; John T. Hilton; Walker Lewis; Coffin Pitts, husband of Clarissa Ann Barbadoes, brother-in-law of James G. Barbadoes; John E. Scarlett; David Walker.

=== The Liberator ===
One month before the first edition of The Liberator, December 10, 1830, William Lloyd Garrison spoke to a gathering of "colored citizens" in Boston, Massachusetts; among those present was James Barbadoes, who writes to Garrison in a February 12, 1831 edition of the paper. The Editor is addressed as "Esteemed Friend", and his speech is commended. Barbadoes says, "...nothing was ever uttered more important and beneficial to our color...full of virtue and consolation, perfect in explanation, and it furnished a rule to live by and to die by."

=== First Annual Convention of Free People of Color ===
In 1831, the following African Americans represented Massachusetts as delegates to the First National Convention of Free People of Color, held in Philadelphia, Pennsylvania - James G. Barbadoes, a hairdresser, Reverend Hosea Easton, Henry H. Moody, Robert Roberts, a printer, and Reverend Samuel Snowden. Barbadoes was appointed vice president.

=== American Colonization Society ===
On February 15, 1831, pursuant to public notice, a meeting was held by the colored citizens of Boston, Massachusetts, at their schoolhouse, for the purpose of expressing their sentiments in a remonstrance against the doings of the State Colonization Society, a chapter of the American Colonization Society. It was called to order by James G. Barbadoes. Mr. Robert Roberts was elected president, and James G. Barbadoes, secretary.

=== New England Anti-Slavery Society ===
In 1831, the New England Anti-Slavery Society (1831–1835) was organized by William Lloyd Garrison, editor of The Liberator. Based in Boston, Massachusetts, members of the New England Anti-Slavery Society supported immediate abolition and viewed slavery as immoral and non-Christian. It was particularly opposed to the American Colonization Society, which proposed sending African Americans to Africa.

The Society sponsored lecturers or "agents" who traveled throughout New England and New York, speaking in local churches or halls, and also selling abolitionist tracts or "The Liberator." Whenever possible, the Society's agents would encourage the formation of local anti-slavery societies. By 1833, there were 47 local societies in ten northern states, 33 of them in New England. The Society also sponsored mass mobilizations such as yearly anti-slavery conventions.

Memoir of William Cooper Nell

"The colored race have been generally considered by their enemies, and sometimes even by their friends, as deficient in energy and courage. Their virtues have been supposed to be principally negative ones. This little collection of interesting incidents, made by a colored man, will redeem the character of the race from this misconception, and show how much injustice there may often be in a generally admitted idea."

I remember, when a boy, in January, 1832, looking in at the vestry window of Belknap Street Church, while the Editor of The Liberator and a faithful few organized the first Anti-Slavery Society. The immediate result of the labors of the Anti-Slavery press and the public lecturers, was the formation of exclusive organizations among the colored people. They, and the great body of the Abolitionists, did not then see eye to eye in the matter of combined action, for many of the latter supposed their Anti-Slavery mission was ended when they had publicly protested against slavery, without being careful to exemplify their principles in every-day practice. Many of the colored people, too, seemed to think that enough of heaven was opened unto them, when white people would talk Anti-Slavery; the idea of social political equality seemingly never being dreamed of by them. In accordance with this view, a society was formed, called the Massachusetts General Colored Association. The object of this Association was the promulgation of Anti-Slavery truth. In January, 1833, it made application to be received as an auxiliary to the Massachusetts then New England Anti-Slavery Society through the following letter:-- At this meeting of the Anti-Slavery Society, Rev. Samuel Snowden was elected a Counsellor; the next year, James G. Barbardoes and Joshua Easton; and subsequently, John T. Hilton was appointed, who, with Charles Lenox Remond, is now Vice President.

The Massachusetts General Colored Association, cordially approving the objects and principles of the New England Anti-Slavery Society, would respectfully communicate their desire to become auxiliary thereto. They have accordingly chosen one of their members to attend the annual meeting of the Society as their delegate, Mr. Joshua Easton, North Bridgewater, solicit his acceptance in that capacity."

- Thomas Dalton, President
- William G. Nell, Vice President
- James G. Barbadoes, Secretary

Of course, this request was cordially granted; but they and their white friends soon learned that complexional Anti-Slavery societies, as such, were absurdities, to say the least, and hence, such distinctions soon melted into thin air; and if the spirit of Susan Paul takes cognizance of events familiar to her when in the flesh, she is now rejoicing in her association with the Anti-Slavery societies of that time, their "Martyr Acre," and her share in the perils consequent upon the burning of Pennsylvania.

Affidavit of James G, Barbadoes

In 1833, James G. Barbadoes, Boston, a member of the New England Anti-Slavery Society Convention, states that among five cases of kidnapping within his knowledge, one was of his own brother.

About eighteen years ago, Robert H. Barbadoes was kidnapped in New Orleans, imprisoned, handcuffed and chained, for about five months or longer, and deprived every way of communication his situation to his parents. His protection was taken from him, and torn up. He was often severely flogged, to be made submissive, and deny that that he was free born. He was unluckily caught with a letter wrote with a stick, and with the blood drawn from his own veins, for the purpose of communicating to his father his situation; but this project failed, for the letter was torn was away from him and destroyed, and he very severely flogged. He then lost most every hope; but at length the above Peter Smith was kidnapped again in this garden of paradise of freedom, and being lodged in the same cell with his, he communicated to Smith the particulars of his suffering. At the examination of Smith, he was found to have free papers, signed by the Governor, in consequence of which, he was set at liberty, He then wrote Barbadoes' parents, and likewise arrived in Boston as soon as the letter. Free papers were immediately obtained, and signed by his father and Mrs. Mary Turel, Mr. ____ Giles, and Thomas Clark, town clerk; and by the Governor of the State, demanding him without delay. He was returned to his native town, Boston, where all these persons belonged. The above wrote by James G. Barbadoes. Testified by him and others of the connexions. Suffolk, as: Boston, Nov. 20, 1833. Subscribed and sworn, before me, David L. Child, Justice of the Peace.

=== American Anti-Slavery Society ===
On his way to the 1833 National Anti-Slavery Convention in Philadelphia, Pennsylvania, "James G. Barbadoes was compelled (though in feeble state of health) to remain on the deck of a Providence, Rhode Island steamboat all night, without shelter, in the wintery month of December: in consequences of which exposure, he was prostrated with sickness for many weeks, and perhaps never fully recovered from the effects of it to the day of his death. So brutal, so murderous, is the spirit of prejudice in this country toward our colored population."

Perhaps recalling the service of his Uncle Isaac Barbadoes during the Revolutionary War to his country, it is reported that while on this miserable passage to Philadelphia, James G. Barbadoes warned: "that in the revolutionary struggle for Britain, our fathers were called upon to fight for liberty, and promptly did they obey the summons--gallantly contenting, shoulder to shoulder, with those who then made no distinction as to the color of a man's skin, that they might secure to themselves and their children the rights and privileges of freemen."

In December 1833, James G. Barbadoes, Massachusetts, was one of sixty-two delegates from eleven States who met in Philadelphia, Pennsylvania, to establish demanding immediate emancipation. This organization would become one of the most important American abolition groups, the American Anti-Slavery Society. Delegates represented a cross-section of those who were to lead the abolition movement over the next three decades. Barbadoes was elected to the American Antislavery Society's Board of Managers.

Signers of the American Anti-Slavery Society's "Declaration of Sentiments" included white Abolitionists: William Lloyd Garrison, Samuel J. May, Arthur Tappan, Lewis Tappan, John G. Whittier, Elizur Wright, and three African Americans: James George Barbadoes, Boston, James McCrummill, Philadelphia, a barber and dentist, and Robert Purvis, Philadelphia, handsome and urbane, who, despite his light complexion, proudly identified himself as an African American.

Whereas the Most High God "hath made of one blood all nations of men to dwell on all the face of the earth," and hath commanded them to love their neighbors as themselves...we believe that it is practicable, by appeals to the consciences, hearts, and interests of the people, to awaken a public sentiment throughout the nation [to oppose] the continuance of Slavery in any part of the Republic.

The Split in the Antislavery Movement

When William Lloyd Garrison reported in 1836 that the American Anti-Slavery Society's "impetus is increasing," he could not foretell that in four years the society would be rent asunder by the defection of the anti-Garrisonian abolitionists. There were strong personality issues in the split. Various charges were brought against Garrison personally. He was charged with having a "deliberate and well-matured design to make the anti-slavery organization subservient to the promotion of personal and sectarian views on the subjects of Women's Rights … Civil Government, the Church, the Ministry, and the Sabbath." Basically, however, the split was the result of genuine ideological differences.

African American abolitionists also split on the same issues that divided white antislavery men and women. James G. Barbadoes, William Cooper Nell, Charles Remond, and William P. Powell supported William Lloyd Garrison and continued to work inside the American Anti-Slavery Society, while Samuel Cornish, Christopher Rush (founder and second bishop of the African Episcopal Zion church), and Charles B. Ray, then an editor of the Colored American, became members of the first executive committee of the new American and Foreign Anti-Slavery Society. Henry Highland Garnet, too, was one of the founders of the new organization and a speaker for the Liberty Party.

A resolution published in The Liberator concluded:

...of Mr. Garrison we can truly add, that we doubt not that the day will come, when many an emancipated slave will say of him, while weeping over his monument, "This was my best friend and benefactor. I here bathe his tomb with the tears of that liberty, which his services and sufferings achieved for me. Resolved, That to slander Garrison, and pronounce him a hypocrite is certainly the most unkind and ungrateful expression that could ever escape the lips of any colored man, and in what we least expected to hear, after so much toil and suffering in our behalf; and we rejoice that such spirits are few and far between.

On the other side, Charles B. Ray wrote an interesting letter to Henry Stanton and James Birney, suggesting that people of color might be feeling somewhat "less warmth of feeling" for Garrison because there were now so many efficient antislavery workers in addition to the editor of The Liberator and also because there was something left to be desired in the "spirit with which Brother Garrison has conducted his own paper since the controversy commenced."

Although Garrison was able to maintain his hold over Boston's black population, most African Americans elsewhere were not so firm in their support. The rivalry between those who supported Garrison and those who opposed him was to become a major feature in the North during the two decades before the Civil War.

=== Education for Boston's Children of Colored ===
African School

In 1787, Prince Hall petitioned the Massachusetts legislature for African American access to the public school system, but was denied. Eleven years later, after petitions by the black parents for separate schools were also denied, black parents organized a community school in the home of Primus Hall, Prince Hall's son, on the corner of West Cedar and Revere Streets on Beacon Hill. In 1808, the grammar school in the Hall home on the northeast corner of West Cedar and Revere Streets was moved to the first floor of the African Meeting House.

In 1815, white businessman Abiel Smith died and bequeathed $4,000 (~$84,215 in 2024) to the Town of Boston for the education of African American children. Boston's School Committee used the money to fund the already existing African School and establish two primary schools in the 1820s.

== Obituary ==
The Obituary for James George Barbadoes appeared in The Liberator on August 6, 1841.

Intelligence has been received that our late worthy colored citizen, Mr. James G. Barbadoes, died at St. Ann's Bay, (Jamaica) on the 22nd of June last, of the 'West Indies fever,' aged 45. Mr. Barbadoes was among the emigrants who went from this section of the country, last year, to the island of Jamaica, hoping to better his condition; but in common with them, he soon found that he had been duped by the flattering representations that had been held out by persons in the pay of the West India proprietors. Two of his children died before him. His afflicted widow, with the remainder of her family, is now probably on her way to Boston.

== See also ==
- Dalton, Thomas
- Lew, Barzillai
- Lew, Harry
