= Elizabeth Blakeley =

- Born: 1835
- Died: March 31, 1919 (aged 83–84)

Elizabeth "Betsey" Blakeley was a freedom seeker who escaped to Boston through the Underground Railroad.

She was born enslaved in Wilmington, North Carolina and was mistreated by her enslaver, George W. Davis, British consul for Wilmington. At fifteen years old, Blakeley was determined to escape. She hid on a boat to Boston in December 1849. George W. Davis smoked out the vessel with tobacco and sulfur three times to force Elizabeth out of the ship but she refused to emerge. Upon arrival after a four week journey, she shared her story with abolitionists at the 18th meeting of Massachusetts Anti-Slavery Society in Faneuil Hall. Blakeley's story was recorded in William Lloyd Garrison's abolitionist newspaper, The Liberator.

She married a man named William Hudson in Boston in 1854, and the couple moved to New Haven, Connecticut in 1855. The couple later relocated to St. John's Ward, Toronto with the help of William Cooper Nell. The Blakeley family moved back to Chelsea, Massachusetts in the 1870s where Elizabeth died in 1919.

== Legacy ==
On September 24, 2023, Blakeley's legacy was honored alongside Lewis Hayden in a set of choreopoems by Boston Poet Laureate Porsha Olayiwola at Faneuil Hall. In 2023, she was recognized as one of "Boston’s most admired, beloved, and successful Black Women leaders" by the Black Women Lead project.
