= Joel W. Lewis =

African-American businessman and abolitionist

Joel W. Lewis was a prominent African-American businessman and abolitionist. He was among the best known and respected reformers in antebellum Boston.

He was the son of Job Lewis (?–1797), a former slave who served in the Continental Army. He was a brother of author and entrepreneur Robert Benjamin Lewis. After attending Hosea Easton's vocational school, he went on to become the owner of a large and successful blacksmith shop in Boston, which employed both black and white mechanics. The shop operated from the 1830s to at least 1870. In the years before the Civil War, he lived at 4 Southac Street in Boston's West End.

In 1833 Lewis became the first vice-president of the Boston Mutual Lyceum, one of several educational and cultural organizations co-founded by William Cooper Nell (apparently separate from the Boston Lyceum, which was founded in 1829). In 1836 he was elected president of the Adelphic Union for the Promotion of Literature and Science, another group founded by Nell; also known as the Adelphic Union Library Association, the group held weekly lectures and debates at the Abiel Smith School on Belknap Street. The Adelphic Union rented a hall in the center of town, rather than in a predominantly black neighborhood, to encourage white Bostonians to attend their lectures and pave the way for black Bostonians to attend lectures at white institutions.

Lewis was active in the abolitionist movement and aided refugees from slavery. In 1840, he was the Chairman of the Massachusetts Anti-Slavery Society. In the 1850s he was a member of the Boston Vigilance Committee. A moderate, he opposed the use of violence, believing it would only reinforce white stereotypes of blacks as uncivilized. He was also involved in the temperance movement, and opened a temperance boarding house in 1839.
