= Boston Mutual Lyceum =

19th-century African American lyceum organization in Boston

- Formation: 1883; 143 years ago
- Founder: William Cooper Nell
- Type: Lyceum
- Location: Boston, USA
- Region served: Greater Boston, Massachusetts, USA
- President: Dudley Tidd
- 1st Vice President: Joel W. Lewis
- 2nd Vice President: Sarah H. Annible

Boston Mutual Lyceum was an African American lyceum organization founded in 1833.

== Organization ==
It included women and had a female vice-president. Two of five managers were also women. The Adelphic Union was an African American literary society in Boston at the same time.

Officers were: Dudley Tidd, president; Joel W. Lewis, 1st vice-president; Sarah H. Annible, 2nd vice-president; Nath Cutler, secretary; and Thomas Dalton, treasurer. Managers were Joseph H. Gover, John B. Cutler, Henry Carroll, Lucy Lew wife of Thomas Dalton and daughter of Barzillai Lew, and Mary Williams. Josiah Holbrook helped organize the group.

Tidd was a laborer who became a property owner along with Dalton, who had been a bootblack.

The abolitionist newspaper The Liberator published by William Lloyd Garrison published a brief notice of the formation of the group listing its officers and managers.

Lucy Lew Dalton is part of the Boston Women's Heritage Trail.

== See also ==
- Abiel Smith School
- Massasoit Guards
