= Thomas Dalton (abolitionist) =

American abolitionist (1794–1883)

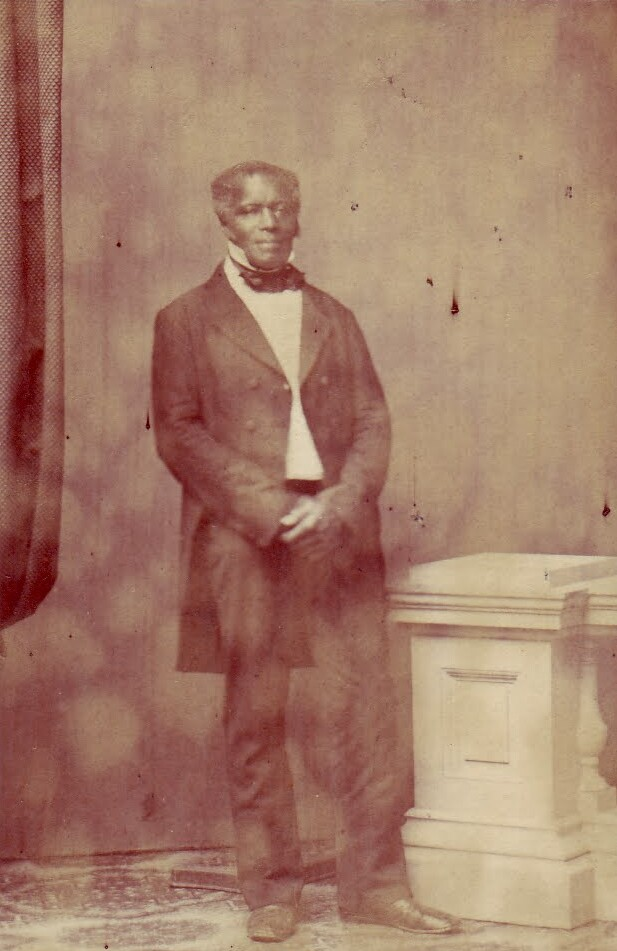
Portrait of Thomas Dalton

Thomas Dalton (1794–1883) was a free African American raised in Massachusetts who was dedicated to improving the lives of people of color. He was active with his wife Lucy Lew Dalton, Charlestown, Massachusetts, in the founding or ongoing activities of local educational organizations, including the Massachusetts General Colored Association, New England Anti-Slavery Society, Boston Mutual Lyceum, and Infant School Association, and campaigned for school integration, which was achieved in 1855.

Lucy and Thomas Dalton strongly believed that integrating schools and improving education for the colored children of Boston was the best avenue "to remove the prejudice which exists against the people of color."

== Early life ==
Thomas Dalton was born on October 17, 1794, in Gloucester, Massachusetts. His father was Thomas Dalton. (Note: Thomas' parents may have been Thomas Dalton and Polly Freeman Dalton, free negroes, who married on January 12, 1792, in Gloucester, Massachusetts, by Rev. Mr. Fuller. Record Thomas Sr. was likely a servant or slave to Tristram Dalton of Newburyport, Massachusetts, a wealthy merchant and United States Senator from Massachusetts to the First Congress. Dalton's mother, Polly Freeman, was likely the daughter of former slave Cato Freeman from Beverly, Massachusetts.)

== Marriages ==
After Thomas Dalton moved from Gloucester to Boston and he married Patience Young in 1818. She died in 1832 in Boston. (Note: A Thomas Dalton married Patience Young on July 5, 1818, by Joshua Huntington. Joshua Huntington was the minister of the Old South Meeting House from 1808 to 1819. On July 14, 1832, at the age of 42, a colored woman named Patience Dalton died. She was the wife of Thomas Dalton and died of intemperance (alcoholism).)

The widower Thomas Dalton married Lucy Lew Francis in 1834. (Note: One account, without verifiable source information, states that the couple were married on June 5, 1834, by Rev. Baron Stow at the Rowe Street Baptist Church in Boston. Boston Marriage records show that the couple was married, or applied for marriage, on May 13, 1834.) Lucy Lew was born in Dracut, Massachusetts (now Lowell), on May 7, 1790, one of 13 children. Her father, Barzillai Lew (1743–1822), born a free black, was a Revolutionary War soldier and a musician. Her mother Dinah Bowman (1744–1837), born a slave, was of mixed-race and described as fair-skinned. About 1766, Brazillai bought Dinah's freedom from the Blood family for 400 pounds (today $28,000.) Lucy Lew and her siblings (Note: On June 11, 1811, her older brother Peter Lew was inducted as Grand Master of the Prince Hall Freemasonry Lodge in Boston. The Lodge was established in 1791 by Prince Hall it was the first masonic lodge for men of color in the United States. It was located on Cambridge Street.) attended the integrated public Coburn Mission School. (Note: The Coburn Mission School was a small gray wooden building with a tall wooden bell tower; It was located off Varnum Avenue.) Her father sang in the choir at the Pawtucket Congregational Church.

Lucy Lew had married her first husband, Samuel Francis, in 1816 or 1817 and they lived in the African American community on the north side of Beacon Hill, and were involved in the community's cultural activities. (Note: There was a Lucy Lew who married Samuel Francis in Boston. There are two records related to their marriage: (1) On October 13, 1816, in Boston, the couple were said to be colored. The book that recorded the information just shows the couple's name and a date; the book does not record information such as who married the couples. (2) On May 20, 1817, the couple, again identified as colored people, were married by Rev. Charles Lowell. Lowell was a minister at the West Congregational (Unitarian) Church of Boston.)

== Residences ==
In 1823, Dalton worked as a bootblack and lived on Botolph Street, Boston, Massachusetts. Dalton lived at 29 South Russell Street in Boston from 1848 to 1853. In 1850 William Dalton, a waiter, was also living at the address. He was also noted as living there in 1864–1865. At an unspecified time, Dalton lived on Flagg Alley; with Dudley Tidd, he purchased land from the Thomas Paul estate [Paul, founding preacher of the African Meeting House, died in 1831]. At the time of his death in 1883, he was living on Bunker Hill Avenue in Charlestown.

== Career ==
Dalton worked at various times as a bootblack, waiter, tailor, and clothing storeowner. His "prosperous" (Note: At the time of his death, his business was worth $500,000. O'Connor says that his estate was worth $50,000, also a sizable estate at that time.) clothing store was on Brattle Street.

== Community activism ==
Dalton was one of the successful African Americans living in Boston's West End (Charlestown) prior to the Civil War. (Note: The address given for Thomas was 29 S. Russell Street.) Dalton was a trustee of the African Methodist Episcopal Zion Church in Boston and "leading light" of "Boston's best-known black abolitionists [who] were also dominant figures in the black churches."

=== African celebration ===
Dalton was one of the marshals of the 1820 annual "African celebration", so named by newspapers, of the ending of the African slave trade by the United States and Great Britain. This was an important annual event that began about 1808, with participation from prominent African-American community leaders.

=== Prince Hall Freemason ===
Dalton joined the Prince Hall Freemasonry Lodge in 1825 to build a network who could improve the lives of African Americans. He was selected Grand Master of the lodge from 1831 to 1832 and again from 1863 to 1872. Dalton was recognized as an "eloquent senior warden" of the organization.

He and abolitionist David Walker oversaw the publication of John T. Hilton's An Address, Delivered Before the African Grand Lodge of Boston, No. 459, June 24th, 1828, by John T. Hilton: On the Annual Festival, of St. John the Baptist (Boston, 1828).

=== Massachusetts General Colored Association ===
Several members of the Prince Hall Lodge met in 1826 and established the Massachusetts General Colored Association "to promote the welfare of the race by working for the destruction of slavery." The elected officers were Thomas Dalton, President; William G. Nell, Vice President; and James G. Barbadoes, Secretary. Other association members included Walker Lewis and David Walker (abolitionist), who became the organization's spokesman and wrote the 1829 Appeal to colored and white people. In it he said: "Remember Americans, we must be as free as you are. Will you wait until we shall under God obtain our liberty by the crushing arm of power?"

=== New England Anti-Slavery Society ===
In January 1833, Dalton as president led a successful petition for the Massachusetts General Colored Association to join the New England Anti-Slavery Society founded by William Lloyd Garrison, editor of The Liberator. Together they organized Anti-Slavery conventions and speaking programs throughout New England.

In 1844, the Massachusetts General Colored Association published Light and Truth by Robert Benjamin Lewis, the first history of the colored race written by an African American. Joining the New England Anti-Slavery Society provided greater participation by Boston's African-American community.

==== Background ====
Boston's African-American community has worked for educational opportunities since shortly after the American Revolutionary War; in 1787 Prince Hall petitioned the legislature for equal access to public schools. His and other people's efforts to gain access to schools were denied. Parents on Beacon Hill organized to hold classes for a school at the home of Hall's son, Primus Hall, starting in 1798. Ten years later the school was moved to the African Meeting House. Parents gained partial support from the city in 1812 for the school, but continued to press for a regular public school. In the 1820s the city government provided 2 primary schools for black children.

The Abiel Smith School was built in 1834 following the bequest of $4,000 by Abiel Smith, a white philanthropist interested in supporting black education. The primary and grammar school was the first building built as a public school for African Americans in the country.

==== Boston Mutual Lyceum ====
In the spring of 1833, the year before they were married, Thomas Dalton and Lucy Lew Francis were among a small group of women and men who formed the Boston Mutual Lyceum on West Central Street to sponsor educational lectures for the colored citizens of the Boston area. Thomas was treasurer and Lucy was one of the managers.

==== Infant School Association ====
Thomas Dalton, Charles V. Caples and George Washington founded the "Infant School Association", which was approved on February 20, 1836, by the governor of Massachusetts. The organization's purpose was "receiving and educating children of color preparatory to their entering higher schools," setting up a kind of kindergarten. The act is chapter 9 of the 1836 state statutes.

==== School integration ====
Parents complained because school conditions and teacher quality was not maintained by the Boston School Committee. Children of color were excluded from Boston's high school and Latin school. The efforts to create a separate but equal school system in Boston failed.

In the mid-1840s, through successful lawsuits, the towns of Nantucket and Salem were forced to integrate their schools. Dalton led seventy other fellow citizens in a renewed effort to gain access for their children into the white public schools of Boston. Together with William Cooper Nell, and attorney Robert Morris, they sent petitions imploring the Boston School Committee: "It is very hard to retain self-respect if we see ourselves set apart and avoided as a degraded race by others. Do not say to our children that however well-behaved their very presence is in a public school, is contamination to your children."

They said that black schools were not providing the same level of education as the multiple forms of white schools, including "primary, grammar, Latin and high schools."

Regarding attempts at school integration, Arthur T. White wrote:

...black separatists sought to control the Boston "African" school mastership. This attempt undermined a movement by black and white abolitionists to integrate Boston's schools. From the black community, integrationists John T. Hilton, a barber, and Thomas Dalton, a tailor, with as many as eighty-eight others had petitioned the school committee three times between 1844 and 1846. They earnestly requested that 'exclusive schools be abolished' and that their children be allowed to attend schools in their respective districts. Consistently refused, blacks boycotted in the late 1840s, lowering African school attendance by 65%. In the state legislature, they lobbied a bill outlawing race as a criterion for school admission. By 1848, blacks had engaged Robert Morris, one of the first black lawyers in America, to file suit in the court of common pleas against the city to test the constitutionality of school segregation. Repeated petitions and demands to integrate Boston's schools were resisted by the Boston School Committee for eleven years. Finally in 1855, the Massachusetts legislature reversed the Boston School Committee's policy by outlawing race as a criterion for admission to a public school in the Commonwealth of Massachusetts."

== Final years ==
Lucy Lew Dalton died of old age in Charlestown on April 12, 1865. At the time of her death, she and Dalton were living at 29 South Russell Street.

Thomas Dalton died on August 30, 1883, then living at 384 Bunker Hill Street. (Note: This Thomas Dalton (abolitionist) is said to have died on August 30, 1883. The death record for that date includes the following information: Thomas Dalton, born 1793 in Scituate, mother Mary, who lived on 384 Bunker Hill St when he died on August 30, 1883. His occupation was caterer (which is not on any published sources for the abolitionist Thomas Dalton).) He left an estate of $50,000 to his three nieces (Catherine L. Dalton Henson, Mary E. Freeman Freeman, and Harriet P. Freeman Johnson.)

== See also ==
- List of African-American abolitionists
- List of museums focused on African Americans - Gerard Lew
- Barbadoes, James George
- Lew, Barzillai
- Lew, Harry
- Massachusetts General Colored Association
