= Hosea Easton =

American minister, abolitionist activist and author

Hosea Easton (1798–1837) was an American Congregationalist and Methodist minister, abolitionist activist, and author. He was one of the leaders of the convention movement in New England.

== Background ==
Hosea Easton was one of four sons of James Easton of North Bridgewater, who originally was a blacksmith, from Middleborough, Massachusetts. The background of his father traces back to a group of slaves freed by Nicholas Easton and his brother Peter Easton, in Rhode Island during the seventeenth century. James Easton married Sarah Dunbar, thought to be of "mixed race". Therefore, his ancestry was African, Native American (Narragansett and Wampanoag), and European. Racial classifications meant little for this family, and Hosea Easton was later to write against their meaning anything intrinsic.

James Easton became a successful businessman in ironwork and was well-connected in the Boston area. From about 1816 to 1830, he ran a vocational school for persons of color that was attached to his foundry. His son Hosea participated in it, with his brother James who became a homeopathic physician.

== Activism in Boston ==
Hosea Easton married in 1827 and moved to Boston in 1828, where he was minister in a church on West Centre Street, Beacon Hill (from 1861 Anderson Street). He joined the Massachusetts General Colored Association that had been set up in 1826. It had the dual aims of agitation for the abolition of slavery, and the welfare of free blacks.

He was one of the Boston Committee set up by the convention of June 1831 in Philadelphia. It also included Samuel Snowden and Thomas Paul, the only black ministers then in Boston, Robert Roberts (who had married Easton's sister Sarah as his second wife and so become brother-in-law), and James G. Barbadoes.

Robert Roberts and Easton's brother Joshua had joined with him in a previous venture, a vocational school in New Haven that would continue his father's ideas. That project had been made impossible by local racial hostility. They then united with him to oppose the American Colonization Society, who were acquiring land in what became Liberia. Some 1831 meetings in Boston on the colonization issue were reported in The Liberator, in March and May.

== Pastor in Hartford ==
Easton moved to Hartford, Connecticut in 1833 with his wife Louisa and family. With local black leaders, he formed the Hartford Literary and Religious Institution and, in January 1834, was appointed its agent. He then toured New England as a fundraiser, but had to cut his plans back because of racial violence.

Easton was a preacher of the African Methodist Episcopal Zion Church (AMEZ) which he joined in the 1830s, and an influence on the young Amos Beman who was in Hartford teaching. Easton applied to the New York AMEZ conference in 1832; it was in 1834 that he was ordained as deacon and elder, by Christopher Rush.

The dates and details of his associations with churches are not completely clear, however. According to one source, in 1833 there was a split of the congregation in Hartford, resulting in Congregational and Methodist churches, and the Metropolitan African Methodist Episcopal Zion Church, now on Main Street, traces its history back to that year. The Metropolitan Church's official history describes an African Religious Society in Hartford in existence in 1827, owning a church on Talcott Street, and the split occurring about 1835. There resulted the Colored Congregational Church, and the Colored Methodist Episcopal Church where Easton was the first pastor. David E. Swift writes that the Talcott Street premises being shared by the Congregational and Methodist groups, Easton persuaded the Methodists to buy land of their own in Elm Street for a new church (which was at a later point identified as the AMEZ church).

Hartford was singled out by Edward Strutt Abdy at this period for the virulence of racial hatred he saw. Easton's congregation were involved in the period 1834–36, culminating in the burning of the Methodist church in 1836. (The evidence points to this church though there is no conclusive local report that identifies the burned church explicitly.)

== Works ==
Easton published A Treatise On the Intellectual Character, and Civil and Political Condition of the Colored People of the U. States; And the Prejudice Exercised Towards Them; With A Sermon on the Duty of the Church To Them (1837). In this work Easton wrote against racial prejudice. He invoked the Declaration of Independence as free from racial discrimination; and he challenged the assumption that slaves could be regarded as machines and lacking in morality. Not well received in its time, it is now considered to be a leading work articulating the African-American abolitionist view, with the 1829 Appeal of David Walker. William Cooper Nell quoted Easton at length in 1859 on the constitutional point, while speaking against the Dred Scott Decision. It has been argued that the book shows the influence of William Apess.

Easton's outlook was rather pessimistic, informed by what he perceived as a hardening of racial divisions into a polarization in the North-East of his time and experience. He wrote of the racist taunts and caricatures common even in Boston. Further, he argued, the stereotypical denigration based on race was a matter of early indoctrination, had economic ends, and was supported by the way white clergy condoned slavery.

Easton argued for race as no more intrinsic than any other effect of variegation. He put his case in a way not calculated to offend on all sides, but still risking having that effect. He dealt with stereotypes, attempting to sift those that were artefacts of the institution of slavery from those that represented human variability and could be attributed to God.

Along with James Forten and William Watkins, Easton queried the "immediatist" assumptions common in white abolitionists. He stated that emancipated slaves would not be capable of self-improvement without help. His message was not what abolitionists, whether black and in many prominent cases escaped slaves, or white, much wanted to hear, and his reputation accordingly suffered. He is now seen as an early Afrocentrist writer, arguing for the cultural inheritance of Ancient Greece from Ancient Egypt. He used the scriptural ethnology of Hamitic and Japhetic lineages to argue for the cultural importance of Africa in the ancient Mediterranean world.
