= John T. Hilton =

American abolitionist and businessman (1801–1864)

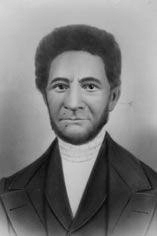
- Born: John Telemachus Hilton; April 1801; Chester County, Pennsylvania, US
- Died: March 5, 1864 (aged 62); Brighton, Massachusetts, US
- Known for: Abolitionist work
- Movement: Anti-Slavery movement
- Spouse: Lavinia M. Ames
- Children: 5

John Telemachus Hilton (April 1801 – March 5, 1864) was an African-American abolitionist, writer, and businessman, who established barber, furniture dealer, and employment agency businesses. He was a Prince Hall Mason and established the Prince Hall National Grand Lodge of North America and served as its first National Grand Master for ten years. He also was a founding member of the Massachusetts General Colored Association, and active member and author in the Anti-Slavery movement.

Both John T. Hilton and his wife, Lavinia (née Ames) Hilton, were active in the Anti-Slavery and Temperance Societies.

== Early life ==
John Telemachus Hilton was born in 1801 in Chester County, Pennsylvania. Hilton traveled to Boston at the age of 17 and married nineteen-year-old Lavinia M. Ames on April 1, 1825, in Boston; they had three sons and two daughters.

By 1830, John T. Hilton had a storefront for a hairdressing shop; the store also included his employment agency, retail sales, furniture commission sales and local event ticket sales.

=== Freemason ===
On June 24, 1847, John T. Hilton helped organized the National Grand Lodge of Prince Hall Freemasonry and served as the first National Grand Master. Hilton was Grand Master of the National Grand Lodge of North America for ten years. In his honor, the Lynn, Massachusetts lodge was named the John T. Hilton Lodge.

He was the first of Boston's African-American men to have "a portrait commissioned by Prince Hall Masonic Lodge."

== Antislavery and community activities ==
Hilton wrote An Address, Delivered Before the African Grand Lodge of Boston, No. 459, June 24, 1828, by John T. Hilton: On the Annual Festival, of St. John the Baptist (Boston, 1828)" and Thomas Dalton (abolitionist) and David Walker oversaw its publication.

=== Massachusetts General Colored Association ===
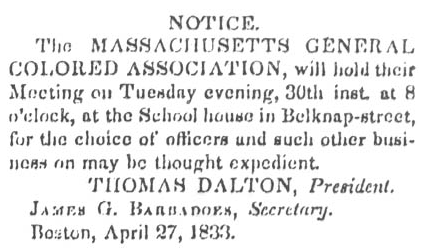
Massachusetts General Colored Association Notice, April 27, 1833 in The Liberator (anti-slavery newspaper)

Hilton and other Prince Hall Freemasons were founding members of the Massachusetts General Colored Association. The organization was said to have had "among its leaders the most spirited and intelligent colored citizens of Boston."

=== Anti-Slavery Society ===
In 1854, Hilton became vice-president of the Massachusetts Anti-Slavery Society. He was also a member of the Boston Vigilance Committee.

Hilton's wife Lavinia was described as one of the "young intellectuals and active abolitionists in the 1830s," along with Susan Paul. Lavinia Hilton and Susan Paul were members of the Boston Female Anti-Slavery Society.

=== Temperance Society ===
By 1838, Hilton was the president of the New England Temperance Society of Colored Americans; His wife Lavina was the treasurer of the women's group.

== Marriage and family ==
Hilton and his wife, Lavinia, were both members of the African Baptist Church. Mrs. Hilton was a member of the female Anti-Slavery Society. At least for the period between 1848 and 1851, Hilton lived at 3 Second Street in the 5th Ward of Boston; He worked as a barber.

Their eldest daughter, Lucretia L. Hilton, attended the Exclusive School in Beacon Hill and the Alumni Grammar School in Cambridge. Lucretia assisted her father in his Anti-Slavery efforts by handing out handbills for the Boston Vigilance Committee. She married John M. Lenox and lived in Waltham, Massachusetts: "She and her husband did much to dispel prejudice in that place, and to increase the antislavery sentiment there existing."

An ancestor of Lavinia Ames Hilton was Prince Ames, a Revolutionary War soldier who served at Bunker Hill.

== Death ==
Hilton died on March 5, 1864, in Brighton, Massachusetts of chronic hepatitis. He was 62 years and 11 months of age, his profession was hairdresser. His wife died on November 2, 1882, in Cambridge, Massachusetts.

== Publications ==
=== As author ===
- Address Delivered Before the African Grand Lodge, Boston, No. 459, June 24, 1828. David Hooton. 1828.
- Proceedings of the Presentation Meeting Held in Boston, Dec. 17, 1855. R.F. Wallcut. 1856.

=== As co-author ===
- John T. Hilton; William Cooper Nell; Charles Wesley Slack; Wendell Phillips; William Lloyd Garrison; Charles Lenox Remond (1856). Triumph of Equal School Rights in Boston: Proceedings of the Presentation Meeting Held in Boston, Dec. 17, 1855: Including Addresses by John T. Hilton, Wm. C. Nell, Charles W. Slack, Wendell Phillips, Wm. Lloyd Garrison, Charles Lennox Remond. R.F. Wallcut.
