= Massachusetts General Colored Association =

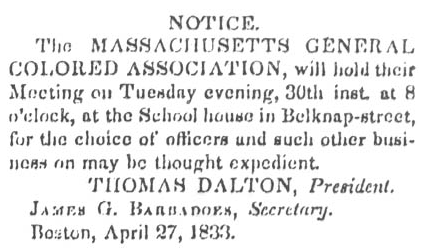
Massachusetts General Colored Association Notice, April 27, 1833 in The Liberator (anti-slavery newspaper)

The Massachusetts General Colored Association was organized in Boston in 1826 to combat slavery and racism. The Association was an early supporter of William Lloyd Garrison. Its influence spread locally and was realized within New England when they joined the New England Anti-Slavery Society in 1833.

== Founders ==
Several members of the Prince Hall Lodge (Note: The founding members have also been defined as African American men who owned clothing stores or were tailors.) met in 1826 and established the Massachusetts General Colored Association "to promote the welfare of the race by working for the destruction of slavery." The elected officers were

- Thomas Dalton (abolitionist), President
- William Guion Nell, Vice President
- James George Barbadoes, Secretary.

One of their most influential founders was David Walker, who probably expressed many of their ideas in his 1829 Appeal in Four Articles to the Colored Citizens of the World. Walker had moved to Boston and in 1825 was the owner of a used clothing store. In March 1827, he began writing for and selling subscriptions to Freedom's Journal, the first national newspaper in the country published by blacks.

Other founding members included Walker Lewis, John Scarlett, and John T. Hilton. The organization was said to have had "among its leaders the most spirited and intelligent colored citizens of Boston."

== Core issues ==
The organization was concerned with the following:

- Abolishing Massachusetts's laws that were discriminatory, such as segregated public accommodations and prohibition of inter-racial marriages
- Abolishing slavery
- Uplifting individuals through education and religion

It was one of the first organizations of free blacks in Boston to directly address slavery.

Association members were also active in organizations to furthered their objectives, such as the African Society, the African School and the African Baptist Church. As Donald M. Jacobs remarked: "Boston's best-known black abolitionists were also dominant figures in the black churches."

The group also supported the Freedom's Journal, the country's first black newspaper which was published in New York City.

== New England Anti-Slavery Society ==
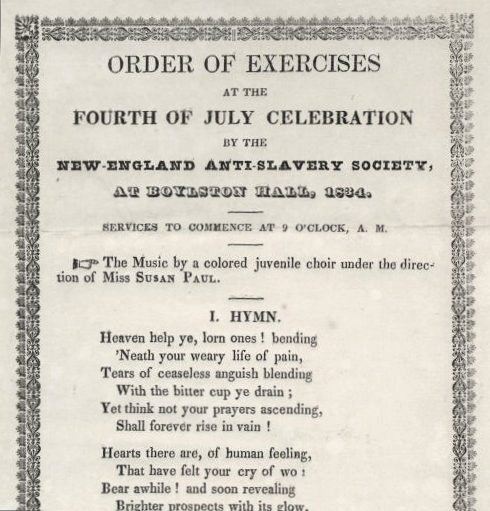
Order of exercises at the Fourth of July celebration by the New-England Anti-Slavery Society, at Boylston Hall, 1834. "... The music by a colored juvenile choir under the direction of Miss Susan Paul."

In January 1833, Dalton as president led a successful petition for the Massachusetts General Colored Association to join the New England Anti-Slavery Society founded by William Lloyd Garrison, editor of The Liberator. Together they organized Anti-Slavery conventions and speaking programs throughout New England.

Sometime after Joshua Easton was sent as a delegate to the New England society in 1833, African Americans were granted full membership in the organization.

In 1844, the Massachusetts General Colored Association published Light and Truth by Robert Benjamin Lewis, the first history of the colored race written by an African American. Joining the New England Anti-Slavery Society provided greater participation by Boston's African American community.

== Influence ==
"Although the all-black association was short lived, its members helped create a new era of militant antislavery agitation that shook the nation before the Civil War."

== See also ==
- Massachusetts Anti-Slavery Society

== Bibliography ==
- Hinks, Peter P. (1996). To Awaken My Afflicted Brethren: David Walker and the Problem of Antebellum Slave Resistance. University Park, Penn.: Pennsylvania State University Press. ISBN 978-0-271-01578-1.
- Horton, James Oliver. (1976). Generations of Protest: Black Families and Social Reform in Ante-Bellum Boston. The New England Quarterly 49.2: 242-256.
- Jacobs, Donald M (1971). William Lloyd Garrison's Liberator and Boston's Blacks, 1830-1865. The New England Quarterly 44.: 259-277.
