= The Colored Patriots of the American Revolution =

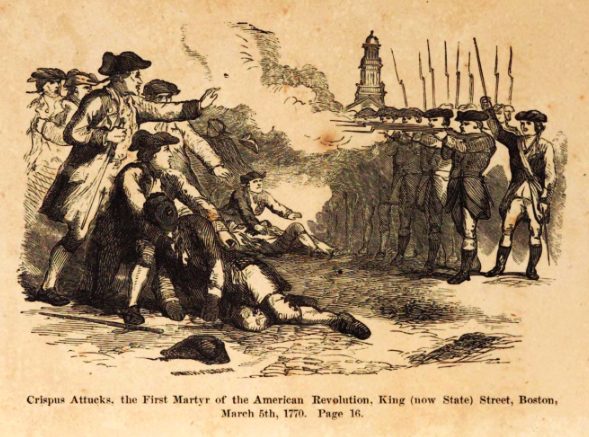
- Frontispiece depicting Crispus Attucks at the Boston Massacre
- Author: William Cooper Nell and Harriet Beecher Stowe
- Language: English
- Genre: History
- Publisher: Robert F. Wallcut
- Publication date: 1855
- Publication place: United States

The Colored Patriots of the American Revolution, With Sketches of Several Distinguished Colored Persons: To Which is Added a Brief Survey of the Conditions and Prospects of Colored Americans, or, in brief, The Colored Patriots of the American Revolution, is an American history book written by William Cooper Nell, with an introduction by Harriet Beecher Stowe. It was published in 1855 by Robert F. Wallcut. It focuses on African-American soldiers during the American Revolution and the War of 1812. It details "the services of the Colored Patriots of the revolution".

Among other patriots mentioned are Crispus Attucks, the first person killed in the Boston Massacre; Peter Salem, who was instrumental in the victory at Bunker Hill; and Prince Whipple, who participated in George Washington's noted crossing of the Delaware.

The Colored Patriots of the American Revolution is considered by some to be the first history book by and about African Americans that is based on written documentation.

== Summary ==
In 1851, William Cooper Nell, an African-American author, wrote the history Services of Colored Americans in the Wars of 1776 and 1812. It became a standard resource for African-American studies. A few years later, Nell wrote The Colored Patriots of the American Revolution, which also became standard reading. It was commonly taught in schools during that time.

Nell said in the conclusion about the goals of his book: "If others fail to appreciate the merit of the colored man, let us cherish the deserted shrine. The names which others neglect should only be the more sacredly our care."

== Contents ==
The book is 396 pages long, organized into 18 chapters. It includes sketches of several "Distinguished Colored Persons," as well as an Introduction by American abolitionist and writer Harriet Beecher Stowe, the author of the popular novel Uncle Tom's Cabin (1852).

=== Introduction ===
In her Introduction, Mrs. Stowe says the book was intended to highlight American Patriots who had been "all but forgotten" and to help reduce prejudices of both whites and blacks toward African Americans. She says that African Americans had been enslaved in the colonies and their laws "oftener oppressed than protected. Bravery, under such circumstances, has a peculiar beauty and merit."

She concludes, "And their white brothers in reading may remember, that generosity, disinterested courage and bravery, are of not particular race and complexion, and that the image of the Heavenly Father may be reflected alike by all. Each record of worth in this oppressed and despised should be pondered, for it is by many such that the cruel and unjust public sentiment, which has so long proscribed them, may be reversed, and full opportunities given them to take rank among the nations of the earth."

=== Chapter I - Massachusetts ===
The first chapter focuses on Massachusetts patriots, such as Crispus Attucks who is considered the first casualty of the American Revolution. As well as the African-Americans on Bunker Hill; such as Seymour Burr, Jeremy Jonah, James and Hosea Easton, Job Lewis, Jack Grove, Bosson Wright, and Phillis Wheatley.

Chapter I also has a section called "Action of the Constitutional Convention in regard to Colored Citizens" as well as "Facts indicating improvement."

=== Chapter II - New Hampshire ===
Jude Hall—Legislative Postponement of Emancipation—Last Slave in New Hampshire—Senator Morrill's Tribute to a Colored Citizen

=== Chapter III - Vermont ===
Seven hundred British soldiers escorted by a Colored Patriot, Lemuel Haynes, Judge Harrington's Anti-Fugitive-Slave-Law Decision

=== Chapter IV - Rhode Island ===
Admission of Hon. Tristam Burges—Defence of Red Bank—Arrest of Major General Prescott by Prince—Colored Regiment of Rhode Island—Speech of Dr. Harris—Loyalty during the Dorr Rebellion

=== Chapter V - Connecticut ===
Hon. Calvin Goddard's Testimony—Captain Humphrey's Colored Company—Fac Simile of General Washington's Certificate—Hamet, General Washington's Servant—Poor Jack—Ebenezer Hills—Latham and Freeman—Franchise of Colored Citizens—David Ruggles—Progress

=== Chapter VI - New York ===
Negro Plot—Debate in the State Convention of 1821 on the Franchise of Colored Citizens—New York Colored Soldiery—Military Convention in Syracuse, 1854—Extract from a Speech of H. Garnet—Cyrus Clarke's victory at the ballot-box—J. M. Whitfield—Statistical and other facts . . . . . 145-159

=== Chapter VII - New Jersey ===
Oliver Cromwell, Samuel Charlton—Hagar—Consistent Fourth of July Celebration

=== Chapter VIII - Pennsylvania ===
James Forten—John B. Vashon—Major Jeffrey—John Johnson and John Davis—Wm. Burleigh—Conduct of Colored Philadelphians during the Pestilence—Charles Black—James Derham—The Jury-Bench and Ballot-Box—Gleanings

=== Chapter IX - Delaware ===
Prince Whipple—The Colored Soldier at the crossing of the Delaware—Proscriptive Law

=== Chapter X - Maryland ===
Thomas Savoy—Thomas Hollen—John Moore—Benjamin Banneker—Frances Ellen Watkins

=== Chapter XI - Virginia ===
The last of Braddock's Men—Patriotic Slave Girl—Benjamin Morris—Consistency of a Revolutionary Hero—Simon Lee—Major Mitchell's Slave—Gen. Washington's desire to emancipate slaves—Hon. A. P. Upshur's Tribute to David Rich—Tribute to Washington by the Emancipated—Aged Slave of Washington—Insurrection at Southampton—Virginia Maroons in the Dismal Swamp

=== Chapter XII - North Carolina ===
David Walker—Jonathan Overton—Delph Williamson—George M. Horton

=== Chapter XIII - South Carolina ===
Hon. Chas. Pinckney's Testimony—Capt. Williamson—Sale of a Revolutionary Soldier—Slaves freed by the Legislature—Veteran of Fort Moultrie—Jehu Jones—Complexional Barriers—Revolt of 1738—The Black Saxons—Denmark Veazie's Insurrection in 1822—William G. Nell

=== Chapter XIV - Georgia ===
Massacre at Blount's Fort—Monsieur De Bordeaux—Slave freed by the Legislature

=== Chapter XV - Kentucky ===
Henry Boyd, Lewis Hayden, The heroic and generous Kentucky slave

=== Chapter XVI - Ohio ===
Cleveland Meeting—Dr. Pennington—Extracts from Oration of William H. Day—Bird's-eye view of Buckeye progress

=== Chapter XVII - Louisiana ===
Proclamation of General Jackson—Colored Veterans—Battle of Orleans—Jordan B. Noble, the Drummer—John Julius—Testimony of Hon. R. C. Winthrop—Cotton-Bale Barricade

=== Chapter XVIII - Florida ===
Toney Proctor

== In popular culture ==
Glenn Beck broadcast a series of specials on his television program Founders Friday, two of which were dedicated to Black Founders. David Barton (founder and president of WallBuilders, LLC) appeared in both episodes, and mentioned The Colored Patriots of the American Revolution.
