= Harry Lew =

American basketball player (1884–1963)

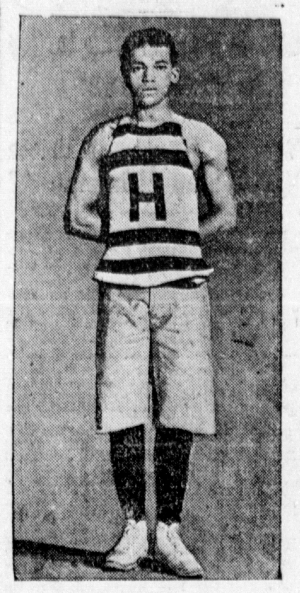
- Lew with Haverhill from 1904 Boston Globe

Personal information
- Born: January 4, 1884 Lowell, Massachusetts, U.S.
- Died: October 22, 1963 (aged 79) Springfield, Massachusetts, U.S.
- Listed height: 5 ft 7 in (1.70 m)
- Listed weight: 150 lb (68 kg)

Career information
- Playing career: 1902–1926

Career history
- 1902–1903: Lowell P.A.C.
- 1903–1905: Haverhill
- 1905–1906: Peabody, Portsmouth, Nashua
- 1905–1926: Lowell
- 1907: Springfield, Saint Johnsbury
- 1908–1914: Lowell
- 1914: Boston All Stars
- 1915–1926: Lowell

Harry Haskell "Bucky" Lew (January 4, 1884 – October 22, 1963) was an American basketball player, who is known as the first black professional basketball player.

== Biography ==
Harry "Bucky" Lew was born in the Pawtucketville section of Dracut, Massachusetts (now the Pawtucketville section of Lowell, Massachusetts, annexed in 1874), the son of William and Isabell (Brown) Lew. Like generations of Lews, Bucky Lew was a talented musician and played a violin solo at his graduation from Pawtucketville Grammar School. In the late 1890s, he entered his father's dry cleaning business in downtown Lowell. His children included a son, William, and daughters Eleanor, Phyllis, and Frances.

== Family history ==
A member of an African-American family with a long history in Massachusetts, his great-great-grandfather, Barzillai Lew, was a freeman who served in the American Revolution. Barzillai was a fifer and served with Captain John Ford at the Battle of Bunker Hill on June 17, 1775. Barzillai was imortalized in the Duke Ellington song "Barzillai Lou". His great-great-aunt Lucy Lew and her husband Thomas Dalton were civil rights activists. The home of his grandparents, Adrastus and Elizabeth Lew, was a station on the Underground Railroad. His father, William Lew, was a delegate to the 1891 Equal Rights Convention in Boston, Massachusetts.

== Basketball career ==
In 1898, he joined the YMCA "young employed boys" basketball team. His team was state champion for the four years he played with them and he led them as captain in his final season as an amateur. Since coaches could not address teams during gameplay in that era, the title of team captain was much more than an honorific.

In 1902, at the age of 18, he was recruited to join Lowell's Pawtucketville Athletic Club "P.A.C." of the New England Professional Basketball League. His teammates recognized Lew as having an impressive variety of skills, including defense, passing, and ball control, and one described him as the best double dribbler in the league, which was legal at the time. Fans and the press were instrumental in Lew's selection. First, reporters pressured the team to add him. Then, when the manager was reluctant to play him that first game, in Lew's words, "the fans got real mad and almost started a riot, screaming to let me play. That did it. I went in there..."

Lew made more history in 1903 when he integrated college basketball as coach of Lowell Textile School, today’s University of Massachusetts at Lowell. The milestone was announced by the Lowell Daily Courier in a short piece on the team’s young season. The story ended with a note that: “The coach of the team is Harry H. Lew of the P.A.C.”

These achievements are remarkable because it came before several better-known pioneers had been introduced to the game. Edwin Henderson, the grandfather of Black basketball, first learned of the game at Harvard in 1904, and Bob Douglas, the father of Black basketball, saw it for the first time in 1906 when he observed a pickup game in New York. He did not return to coach the next season, likely because his playing rights were “loaned” from the P.A.C. to an expansion team in Haverhill, making playing pro ball and coaching college in different cities impractical.

Lew was back at the school in 1922, with the Lowell Courier Citizen announcing “Textile Resumes Basketball Work: ‘Bucky’ Lew in Charge and a Fast Team Is Expected from His Coaching.” The team got off to the expected hot start and boasted a 6–1 record before injuries and influenza struck. They ended the season at 7–7 but had a perfect record against Massachusetts teams, including a sweep of Boston College, two games to none. Victories over New Bedford Textile and Fall River Textile (now consolidated as UMass Dartmouth) gave them an informal "textile school championship."

Years later "Bucky" Lew was interviewed by Gerry Finn for the Springfield, Massachusetts Union on April 2, 1958 about that first game. "I can almost see the faces of those Marlborough players when I got into that game," said Lew, who was seventy-four when the article was published. "Our Lowell team had been getting players from New York, New Jersey, Pennsylvania, and some of the local papers put the pressure on by demanding that they give this little Negro from around the corner a chance to play. Well, at first the team just ignored the publicity. But a series of injuries forced the manager to take me on for the Marlborough game. I made the sixth player that night and he said all I had to do was sit on the bench for my five bucks pay. There was no such thing as fouling out in those days so he figured he'd be safe all around.

"It just so happens that one of the Lowell players got himself injured and had to leave the game. At first this manager refused to put me in. He let them play us five on four but the fans got real mad and almost started a riot, screaming to let me play. That did it. I went in there and you know . . . all those things you read about Jackie Robinson, the abuse, the name-calling, extra effort to put him down . . . they're all true. I got the same treatment and even worse. Basketball was a rough game then. I took the bumps, the elbows in the gut, knees here and everything else that went with it. But I gave it right back. It was rough but worth it. Once they knew I could take it, I had it made. Some of those same boys who gave the hardest licks turned out to be among my best friends in the years that followed."

"The finest players in the country were in that league just before it disbanded and I always wound up playing our opponent's best shooter," Lew said. "I like to throw from outside but wasn't much around the basket."

"Of course, we had no backboards in those days and everything had to go in clean. Naturally, there was no rebounding and after a shot there was a brawl to get the ball. There were no out-of-bounds markers. We had a fence around the court with nets hanging from the ceilings. The ball was always in play and you were guarded from the moment you touched it. Hardly had time to breathe, let alone think about what you were going to do with the ball."

The New England League disbanded after the 1905 season. For the next twenty years, Lew barnstormed around New England with teams he organized as well as occasionally joining other teams. One such team was the Springfield Athletic Club, with whom he won the Vermont state championship in 1907.

Lew said he played his final game in Vermont he was forty-two years old. That was 24 years before the Boston Celtics drafted Charles Chuck Cooper, the first African American for the NBA. In 1928, he moved and relocated his dry cleaning business to Springfield, Massachusetts, where he lived until he died in 1963.

"Bucky" Lew was a man of courage and perseverance. "He didn't talk much about basketball," his daughter told a reporter, "but sometimes, if things weren't going so well for one of us, or if we were having difficult times, he'd talk about how things were for him back then. He used his athletic experience to teach us what life was about." His granddaughter echoed those comments in an interview with the New York Times in 2026. "You’re not going to be able to please everybody. But you do your best. And in your heart, you know you’ve done your best."

Lew has not been inducted into the Naismith Memorial Basketball Hall of Fame, Springfield, Massachusetts, despite the efforts of his daughter, Phyllis, in the 1970s, and the work of Lowell historian Martha Mayo to set up a temporary exhibit which included Lew in 2001. Lew had been on the eligible list for the Hall's Early African-American Pioneers Direct-Elect Committee before it disbanded in 2023. Despite the Naismith's reluctance to make him a member, Lew was inducted into the American Basketball Hall of Fame in Detroit, Michigan in 2026. See: https://www.wwlp.com/news/local-news/springfield-basketball-pioneer-bucky-lew-receives-hall-of-fame-recognition/

== Legacy ==
Lew’s legacy includes the assist he gave the Dodgers when they decided to integrate their organization. Branch Rickey signed Jackie Robinson to play in Montreal then looked for a place for Black players in the US. The Dodgers struggled until they reached Fred Dobens in Nashua, New Hampshire. Dobens, a newspaper editor for the Nashua Telegraph, assured the Dodgers that his city would welcome their efforts. A former high school basketball player whose team entertained fans at halftime of Lew’s games, he saw firsthand the depth of the respect fans, peers, and press held for the man. The Dodgers’ move was a success and it ultimately led to the integration of all major league sports.

== See also ==
- Lowell High School (Lowell, Massachusetts) Teresa and Gerard Lew (sister and brother)
- List of museums focused on African Americans Gerard Lew (brother)
