= African Meeting House =

Historic church in Massachusetts, United States

- U.S. National Register of Historic Places
- U.S. National Historic Landmark
- U.S. National Historic Landmark District – Contributing property
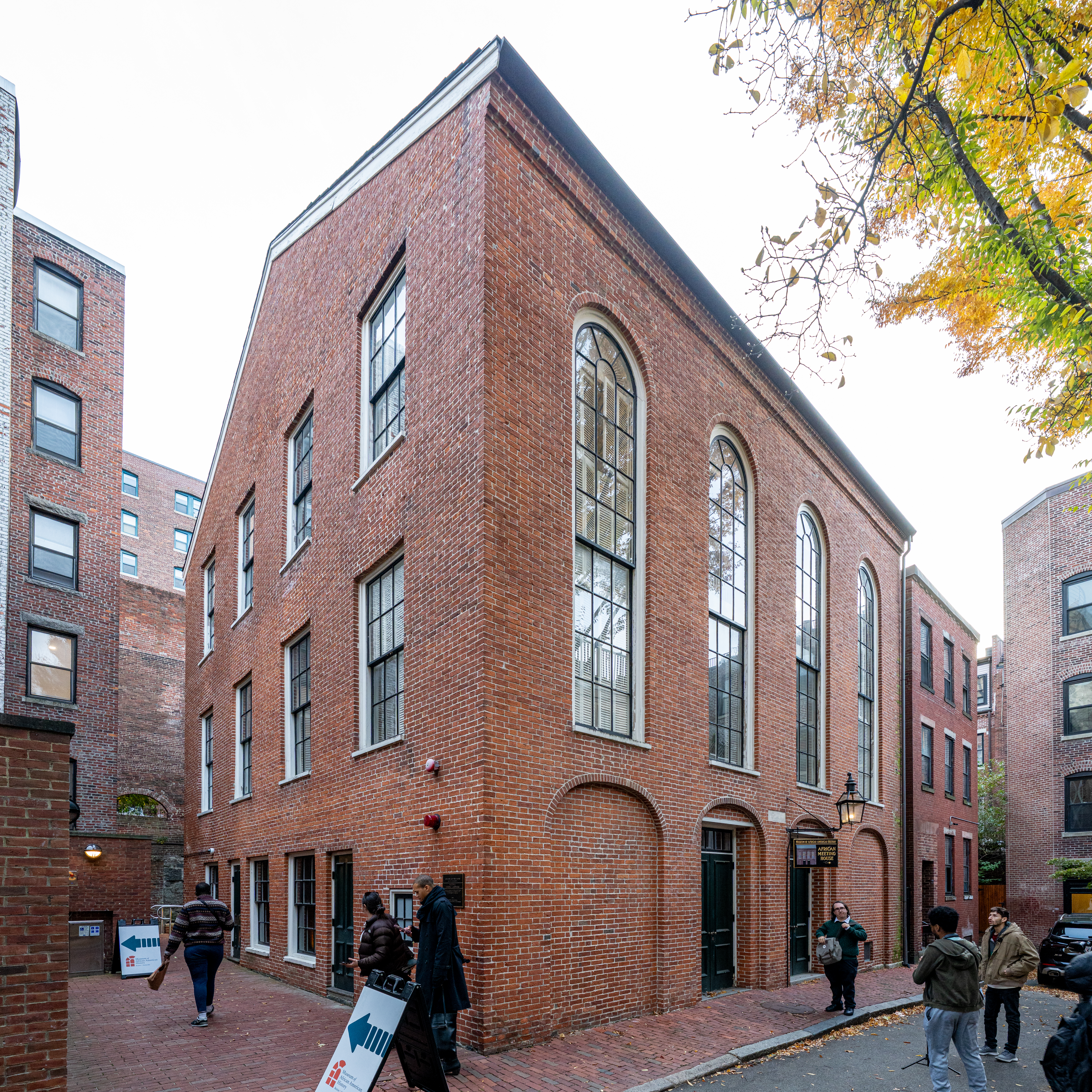
- Location: 8 Smith Court, Boston, MA
- Coordinates: 42°21′35.94″N 71°3′55.73″W
- Built: 1806
- Architectural style: Federal
- Part of: Beacon Hill Historic District (ID66000130)
- NRHP reference No.: 71000087

Significant dates
- Added to NRHP: October 7, 1971
- Designated NHL: May 30, 1974
- Designated NHLDCP: October 15, 1966

The African Meeting House, also known variously as First African Baptist Church, First Independent Baptist Church and the Belknap Street Church, was built in 1806 and is now the oldest black church edifice still standing in the United States. A Baptist congregation led by Reverend Thomas Paul built the church. The church also established a school, at first holding classes in its basement. After serving most of the nineteenth century as a church, it then served as a synagogue until 1972 when it was purchased for the Museum of African American History. It is located in the Beacon Hill neighborhood of Boston, Massachusetts, adjacent to the historically Black American Abiel Smith School, now also part of the museum. It is a National Historic Landmark.

== History ==
=== Church ===
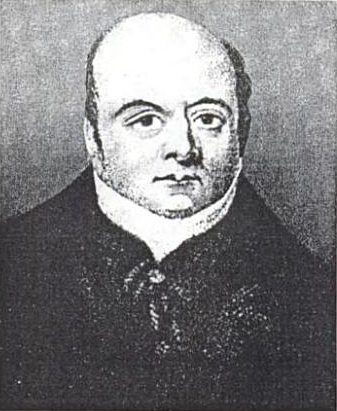
Portrait of Thomas Paul

Before 1805, although black Bostonians could attend white churches, they generally faced discrimination. They were assigned seats only in the balconies and were not given voting privileges.

Thomas Paul, a Black American preacher from New Hampshire, led worship meetings for blacks at Faneuil Hall. Paul, with twenty of his members, officially formed the First African Baptist Church on August 8, 1805. In the same year, land was purchased for a building. The African Meeting House, as it came to be commonly called, was completed the next year. At the public dedication on December 6, 1806, the first-floor pews were reserved for all those "benevolently disposed to the Africans," while the black members sat in the balcony of their new meeting house.

==== Ministers ====
- Thomas Paul, c. 1805–1829
- John Peck, c. 1830
- Washington Christian, c. 1831
- Thomas Ritchie, c. 1832
- Samuel Gooch, c. 1833–1834
- John Given, c. 1835
- Armstrong W. Archer, c. 1837
- George H. Black, c. 1838–1840
- John T. Raymond, c. 1841–1845
- William B. Serrington, c. 1848–1849
- William Thompson, c. 1851–1853
- Thomas Henson, c. 1856–1858
- J. Sella Martin, c. 1860–1862
- H. H. White, c. 1864

=== School (1806–1835) ===
In the early 1800s, Primus Hall had established a school in his home. He sought funding from the community, including Black American sailors, to pay for expenses to run the school. Unsuccessful in attempts to establish a public school with the city of Boston in 1800, he moved his school to the African Meeting House by 1806. Hall continued fund-raising to support the Black American school until 1835.

Besides inspiring Boston's Black Americans to pursue justice and quality in education, the school offered them opportunities for employment and economic growth, which in turn provided funds for future generations of Black American Bostonians to pursue higher education.

The Abiel Smith School was built in 1834 following the donation of $2,000 (~$68,789 in 2025) by Abiel Smith. The primary and grammar school was the first building built as a public school for Black Americans in the country. In 1835, all Black American children in Boston were assigned to the Smith school, which replaced the basement school in the African Meeting House.

=== Civic activities (1832 and Civil War) ===
The African Meeting House became known as the Black Faneuil Hall during the abolitionist movement. On January 6, 1832, William Lloyd Garrison founded the New England Anti-Slavery Society here. During the Civil War, Frederick Douglass and others recruited soldiers here for the 54th and 55th Massachusetts Regiments.

=== Synagogue (late 19th century – 1972) ===
At the end of the 19th century, when the black community began to migrate to the South End and Roxbury, the building was sold to a Jewish congregation, Anshei Lubavitch. They were the new immigrants in the city and living on Beacon Hill and in the North End. It served as a synagogue until 1972, when it was acquired by the Museum of African American History and adapted as a museum.

=== Museum (c. 1972–present) ===
It was declared a National Historic Landmark in 1974.

The African Meeting House houses the Museum of African American History, which is a museum "dedicated to preserving, conserving and accurately interpreting the contributions of African Americans in New England from the colonial period through the 19th century," according to the museum's website. The African Meeting House is open to the public. This site is part of Boston African American National Historic Site.

Adjacent to the African Meeting House, is the Education and Technology Center. The Trust for Public Land assisted in the acquisition of the building when the museum needed space to expand.

== Construction and remodeling ==
Funds for the African Meeting House were raised in both the white and black communities. Cato Gardner, a native of Africa, was responsible for raising more than $1,500 toward the total $7,700 to complete the meeting house. A commemorative inscription above the front door reads: "Cato Gardner, first Promoter of this Building 1806." Scipio and Sylvia Dalton also helped organize and raise money to build the church.

Although the building committee was able to secure $2,500 for the church, the congregation and the committee were compelled to ask the Massachusetts legislation for funds to complete construction. This funding request required an accounting of persons who worked on and supplied materials to the construction project and documents that both African-American and white laborers contributed to it. This accounting lists, for example, that the white carpenter Amos Penniman worked on the African Meeting House. This research has not yet located this document, but it does substantiate that Abel Barbadoes did masonry work on the building, as Chloe Thomas, then a resident of the Home for Aged Colored Women, told George Ruffin in 1883:

I heard from the lips of some of our most honored fathers, Cato Gardner, Father Primus Hall, Hamlet Earl, Scipio Dalton, Peter G. Smith, G.H. Holmes, that George Holmes made the first hod to carry bricks and mortar that was ever used in Boston. He invented it for the purpose of carrying bricks and mortar to build our meeting house with as he was a mason and calculated to do his part to the best of his ability. And Boston Smith, father of P.G. Smith, with the rest of his devoted brothers, was anxious to do all in his power. As Boston Smith was a master builder, he led the carpentry department. ... Abel Barbadoes, being a master mason also assisted. He was the father of Mrs. Catherine Barbadoes at 27 Myrtle Street.

The façade of the African Meeting House is an adaptation of a design for a townhouse published by Boston architect Asher Benjamin. In addition to its religious and educational activities, the meeting house became a place for celebrations and political and anti-slavery meetings. The African Meeting House was remodeled by the congregation in the 1850s.

== See also ==
- List of museums focused on African Americans
- List of National Historic Landmarks in Boston
- National Register of Historic Places listings in northern Boston, Massachusetts
- Thomas Dalton
- James George Barbadoes
- Twelfth Baptist Church, Boston
- History of African Americans in Boston
