= Barzillai Lew =

American revolutionary soldier and musician (1743–1822)

- Born: November 5, 1743; Groton, Massachusetts
- Died: January 18, 1822 (aged 78); Dracut, Massachusetts
- Spouse: Dinah Bowman (m. 1766)
- Children: 13
- Military career
- Allegiance: Great Britain (1760); United States (1775-onward)
- Enlisted: 1775-1777
- Nickname: "Zeal"
- Units: 29th (Worcestershire) Regiment of Foot (Great Britain; French and Indian War); 27th Continental Regiment (United States; Revolutionary War)
- Campaigns: French and Indian War (Great Britain); Montreal campaign; American Revolutionary War (United States); Battle of Bunker Hill; Siege of Boston

Barzillai Lew (November 5, 1743 – January 18, 1822) was an American soldier who fought in the French and Indian War. He later served with distinction during the American Revolutionary War.

== Family History ==
Barzillai Lew's story began with Primus Lew of Groton, Massachusetts (a former servant / slave of Captain Jonathan Boynton), and Maragret Lew (a former servant of Samuel Scripture). As free blacks, Primus and Margaret Lew married December 28, 1742 and they had two sons and two daughters. Primus served as a musician in the French and Indian War in 1747. October 18, 1752, Primus married again to Rose Canterbury and bought a farm on the west side of the Nashua River in the Pepperell section of Groton, Massachusetts and they had two children.

Primus and Maragret Lew's oldest son Barzillai, often called "Zeal" or "Zelah," was born a free black in Groton, Massachusetts November 5, 1743. Following in his father's footsteps, Barzillai Lew was a fifer in Captain Thomas Farrington's Company from Groton, which marched northward for "the total reduction of Canada". From March 10, 1760 to December 1, 1760, he served with the English forces against the French and Indians during the French and Indian War, and was probably present in the capture of Montreal by the British. Lew was known as "big and strong with an extraordinary talent as a musician."

In the mid-1760s, Lew sold his family farm in the Pepperell section of Groton and moved to Chelmsford, Massachusetts, where he worked as a cooper making barrels. About 1766, he bought the freedom of Dinah Bowman (1744–1837) for four hundred dollars (2025 value about $17,000) and married her. "Barzillai Lew purchased his wife Dinah of Major Abraham Blood. ... Barzillai was a cooper by trade and quite dark-colored; Dinah was a mulatto and almost white—bleached out, as some of the slaves were in the South."

== American Revolutionary War ==
=== Bunker Hill ===
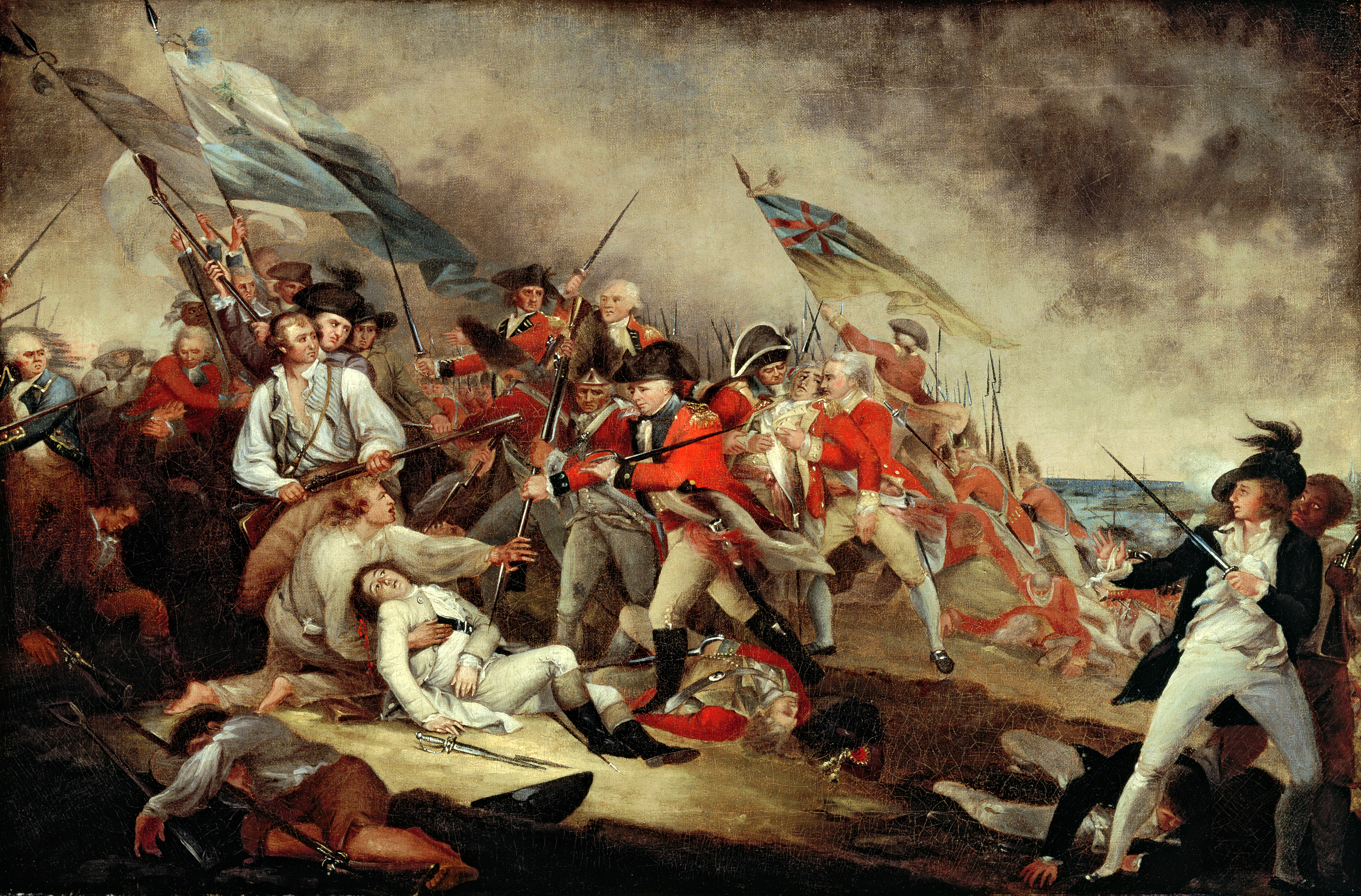
The Death of General Warren at the Battle of Bunker Hill by John Trumbull, an American patriot and painter who witnessed the battle which took place on June 17, 1775. His depiction of the battle was created nine years later when Trumbull was studying in London. The black man holding a musket pictured in the right corner may have been intended to be Asaba Grosvenor, a slave belonging to the colonial officer he stands behind.

At the opening of the American Revolution, Lew's skills and talents were called upon again, and on May 6, 1775, he enlisted in Captain John Ford's Company, 27th Regiment, Chelmsford, Massachusetts. As soldier, fifer and drummer, Lew fought at the Battle of Bunker Hill on June 17, 1775. In the military records, Lew is described as "cooper by trade, and quite dark-colored, a large man, six feet tall." Bunker Hill was one of the most important battles in the American Revolution; inexperienced colonial forces fought a highly trained army of British soldiers. Less well-known were the approximately three dozen African-American soldiers including Lew, Phillip Abbot †, Alexander Ames, Isaiah Bayoman, Cuff Blanchard, Titus Coburn, Grant Cooper, Caesar Dickenson, Charlestown Eaads, Alexander Eames, Asaba Grosvenor, Blaney Grusha, Jude Hall, Cuff Haynes, Cato Howe, Caesar Jahar, Pompy of Braintree, Salem Poor, Caesar Post, Job Potama, Robin of Sandowne, New Hampshire, Peter Salem, Seasor of York County, Sampson Talbot, Cato Tufts, and Cuff Whitemore, who also took part in the battle.

During the battle, the British suffered 226 killed and 828 wounded. TheAmericans suffered 140 dead, 301 wounded, and 30 captured. It was said that during the battle, Lew kept American morale high with his fife version of "There's Nothing Makes the British Run like 'Yankee Doodle Dandy.'" The powder horn used by Barzillai Lew in the Revolutionary War is now in collections of the DuSable Museum of African American History in Chicago, Illinois; it was donated by Gerard Lew, the great-great-grandson of Barzillai Lew and a co-founder of the DuSable Museum.

=== Fort Ticonderoga and Burgoyne's surrender ===
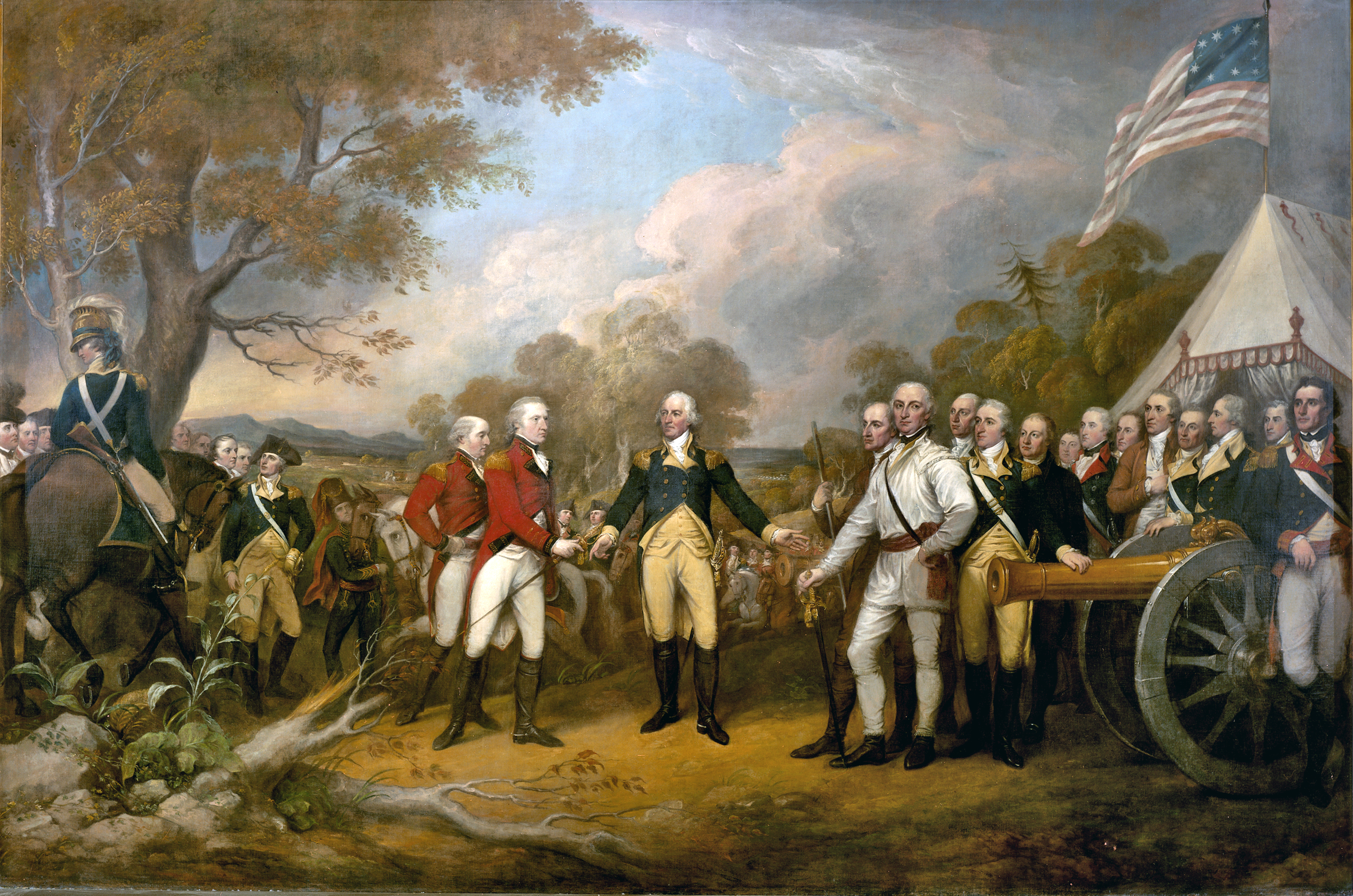
Surrender of General Burgoyne at Fort Ticonderoga hangs in the United States Capitol Rotunda.

In 1777, on his return home to Chelmsford, Lew joined Captain Joseph Bradley Varnum's company of volunteers at Dracut, Massachusetts. In September 1777, Varnum's militia was ordered to Fort Ticonderoga and the company marched to reinforce the Northern army. Joseph Bradley Varnum's son John wrote in his journal on November 1, 1777: "Jona Parkhurst came home from ye Army, brings word that all is well. Zeal is selected for a fifer and fiddler for the grand appearance the day that Burgoyne's Famous Army is to be brought in. A Wonderful Show, a day that our hearts should be employed to speak & live to the praise of God." This 'wonderful show' was the surrender of British General John Burgoyne to American General Horatio Gates at Saratoga, after the Siege of Fort Ticonderoga (1777). During the American Revolution, African Americans from Massachusetts served as freemen or as slaves with their masters in many local militias.

=== African Americans in the Continental Army ===
General George Washington, Commander-in-Chief, excluded African Americans from serving in the Continental Army, until finally on January 2, 1778, Washington responded to a letter from General James Mitchell Varnum (born in Dracut, Massachusetts and brother of Joseph Bradley Varnum) recommending that Rhode Island's troop quota should be completed with blacks.

Washington urged Rhode Island Governor Nicholas Cooke to give the recruiting officers every assistance. In February, the Rhode Island legislature approved the action, giving slaves their freedom in return for military service. The resulting black regiment, commanded by white Quaker Christopher Greene, was the 1st Rhode Island Regiment also known as the Varnum Continentals.

== After the American Revolutionary War ==
During the war, with wages earned from his years of service, the Lew family purchased a large tract of farmland on the far side of the Merrimack River in Dracut (now Lowell, Massachusetts). They built a house near Varnum Avenue on Zeal Road named for Barzillai (now called Totman Road). After the war, Lew returned to his farm in the Pawtucketville section of Dracut. In addition to farming, he continued to work as a cooper, making barrels for the Middlesex Canal Company. The Lews were both active members of their community and the Pawtucket Society Church (Congregational) on Mammoth Road. They raised 13 children, Zadock (1768), Amy (1771), Serviah (1773), Eucebea (1775), Barzillai II (1777), Peter (1779), Rufus (1780; impressed at sea by the British in 1808), Eri (1782), Dinah II (1784), Zimri (1785), Phebe (1788), Lucy (1790; married Thomas Dalton), and Adrastus (1793).

"They all possessed a natural talent for music and most of them could play any kind of wind or string instrument - the girls as well as the boys. They formed a complete band and played at all first-class occasions in this vicinity from Boston, Massachusetts to Portland, Maine." They were noted throughout the 19th and 20th centuries as well-educated, skilled, and talented musicians. It was said "no family in Middlesex County from Lowell to Cambridge could produce so much good music." They kept an elegant coach and fine span of horses, and came on the Sabbath to the Pawtucket Society Church in as much style as any family in the town of Dracut. Dinah Bowman Lew may have been the first African-American woman pianist in American history. Barzillai Lew died in Dracut on January 18, 1822. Years later, Dinah Bowman Lew petitioned and received from the Commonwealth of Massachusetts a pension for her husband's military service in the American Revolution.

== Legacy ==
After his death in 1822, Barzillai Lew's Pawtucketville farm went to his sons, Zadock and Zimri. Zadock, a well-known musician, died in 1826 without a will and his property was sold at auction. Zimri died in 1847 in a train accident in Lowell on Fast Day. In 1844, Zimri's son, Adrastus, married Elizabeth Freeman of Derry, New Hampshire. They purchased and cleared a piece of woodland off Riverside Street and built a house which still stands on Mount Hope Street. In 1912, at the age of 91, Elizabeth Freeman Lew recounted in an interview with the Lowell Sun: "The house where I live was, one of the houses which in slavery times, formed one of the underground railroad where runaway slaves would come for shelter and protection on their way to Canada. Those were terrible times."

Adrastus and Elizabeth Lew had five sons and one daughter. James moved to Cambridge, Massachusetts, formed a popular dance band, and served as the music advisor to the Cambridge School Committee. William and Fred opened a successful dry-cleaning and dyeing business in Lowell.

In 1874, William married Isabell Delaney of Virginia and had four children: Harry, Theresa, Marion, and Gerard. After graduating from Pawtucketville Junior High School, Harry Lew entered the family's dry-cleaning and dyeing business. He was recruited to join Lowell's Pawtucketville Athletic Club, "P.A.C.", of the New England Professional Basketball League and was the first to integrate professional basketball in 1902. Theresa Lew graduated from Lowell High School as class salutatorian in 1912. After finishing Lowell Normal School, she taught at the Bartlett School for 25 years. Marion Lew also graduated from Lowell High School and the Lowell Normal School music program. She taught piano to generations of Lowell children. Gerard Lew, also an outstanding athlete, graduated from Lowell High School and the University of Massachusetts Amherst. He was interviewed by the Lowell Sunday-Telegram in June 1913, about his experiences teaching in a poor, rural, segregated school in Gloucester County, Virginia.

In 1943, musician Duke Ellington wrote a piano piece in honor of Barzillai Lew. It is believed that he learned about Barzillai Lew from his high school teacher, African-American historian Carter G. Woodson at the Armstrong Manual Training School, Washington, D.C.

== See also ==
- Thomas Dalton, hosband of Lucy Lew, abolitionist, daughter of Barzillai Lew
- Harry Haskell (Bucky) Lew, first professional basketball player, second great-grandson of Barzillai Lew
