= David Walker (abolitionist) =

African-American abolitionist (1796–1830)

- Born: September 28, 1796 (Note: According to the Cape Fear Historical Institute, his date of birth is September 28, 1785. Historians disagree about David Walker's date of birth. The Certificate of Death filed in the Commonwealth of Massachusetts is listed in the Registry of Births, Marriages, and Death, City of Boston Index of Death, 1801–1848, 300.); Wilmington, North Carolina, U.S.
- Died: August 6, 1830 (aged 33); Boston, Massachusetts, U.S.
- Occupations: Abolitionist, journalist
- Known for: An Appeal to the Colored Citizens of the World (1830)
- Notable work: Walker's Appeal, in Four Articles; Together with a Preamble, to the Colored Citizens of the World, but in Particular, and Very Expressly, to Those of the United States of America, Written in Boston, State of Massachusetts, September 28, 1829.
- Spouse: Eliza Butler (married 1826-1830)
- Children: Lydia Ann Walker; Edward G. Walker

David Walker (September 28, 1796 – August 6, 1830) was an American abolitionist, writer, and anti-slavery activist. Though his father was enslaved, his mother was free; therefore, he was free as well (partus sequitur ventrem). In 1829, while living in Boston, Massachusetts, with the assistance of the African Grand Lodge (later named Prince Hall Grand Lodge, Jurisdiction of Massachusetts), he published An Appeal to the Colored Citizens of the World, a call for black unity and a fight against slavery, which James T. Campbell called a "watershed in the history of black nationalism."

The Appeal brought attention to the abuses and inequities of slavery and the responsibility of individuals to act according to religious and political principles. At the time, some people were aghast and fearful of the reaction that the pamphlet would provoke. Southern citizens were particularly upset with Walker's viewpoints and as a result there were laws banning circulation of "seditious publications" and North Carolina's "legislature enacted the most repressive measures ever passed in North Carolina to control slaves and free blacks".

His son, Edward G. Walker, was an attorney and in 1866, was one of the first two black men elected to the Massachusetts State Legislature.

== Early life and education ==
Walker was born in Wilmington, North Carolina. His mother was free. His father, who had died before his birth, had been enslaved. Since American law embraced the legal principle of partus sequitur ventrem, lit. 'that which is brought forth follows the womb', Walker inherited his mother's status as a free person.

Walker found the oppression of fellow black people unbearable. "If I remain in this bloody land," he later recalled thinking, "I will not live long ... I cannot remain where I must hear slaves' chains continually and where I must encounter the insults of their hypocritical enslavers." Consequently, as a young adult, he moved to Charleston, South Carolina, a Mecca for upwardly mobile free black people. He became affiliated with a strong African Methodist Episcopal Church (AME Church) community of activists, members of the first black denomination in the United States. He later visited and likely lived in Philadelphia, a shipbuilding center and location of an active black community, where the AME Church was founded.

== Marriage and children ==
Walker settled in Boston by 1825; slavery had been abolished in Massachusetts after the American Revolutionary War. On February 23, 1826, he married Eliza Butler, the daughter of Jonas Butler. Her family was an established black family in Boston. Their children were Lydia Ann Walker (who died July 31, 1830, of lung fever at the age of one year and nine months in Boston), and Edward G. Walker (1831–1901). (Note: His year of birth is also given as 1830 and 1835. His date of death is also given as 1901.)

== Career ==
He started a used clothing store in the City Market. He next owned a clothing store on Brattle Street near the wharfs. There were three used clothing merchants, including Walker, who went to trial in 1828 for selling stolen property. The results are unknown.

He aided runaway slaves and helped the "poor and needy". Walker took part in civic and religious organizations in Boston. He was involved with Prince Hall Freemasonry, a fraternal organization formed in the 1780s that stood up against discriminatory treatment of black people; became a founder of the Massachusetts General Colored Association, which opposed colonization of free American Black People to Africa; and was a member of Rev. Samuel Snowden's Methodist church. Walker also spoke publicly against slavery and racism.

Thomas Dalton and Walker oversaw the publication of John T. Hilton's An Address, Delivered Before the African Grand Lodge of Boston, No. 459, June 24, 1828, by John T. Hilton: On the Annual Festival, of St. John the Baptist (Boston, 1828).

Although they were not free from racist hostility and discrimination, black families in Boston lived in relatively benign conditions in the 1820s. The level of black competency and activism in Boston was particularly high. As historian Peter Hinks documents: "The growth of black enclaves in various cities and towns was inseparable from the development of an educated and socially involved local black leadership." By the end of 1828, Walker had become Boston's leading spokesman against slavery.

== Freedom's Journal ==
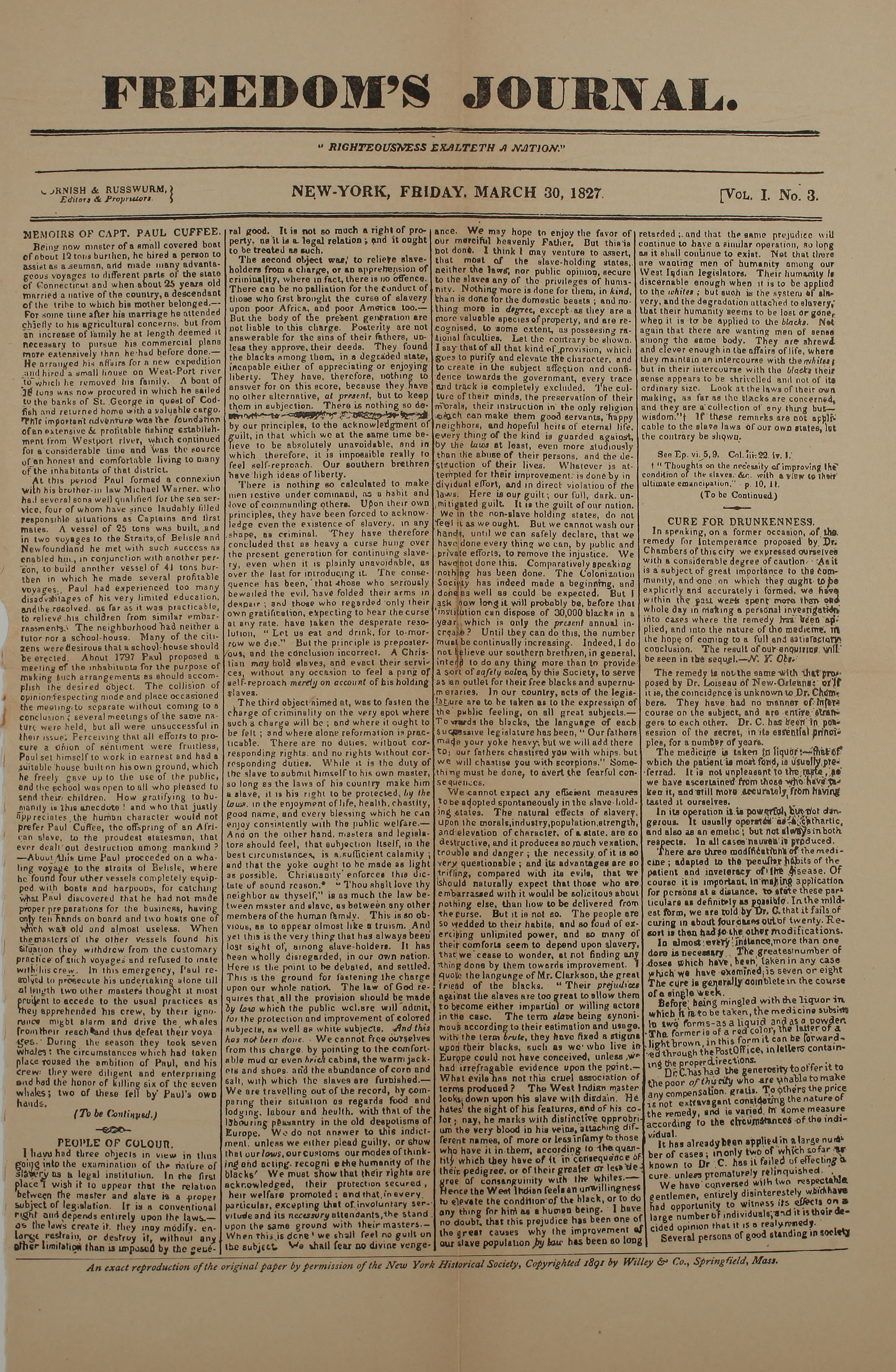
An issue of Freedom's Journal

Walker served as a Boston subscription sales agent and a writer for New York City's short-lived but influential Freedom's Journal (1827–1829), the first newspaper owned and operated by African Americans.

== Walker's Appeal ==
=== Publication history ===
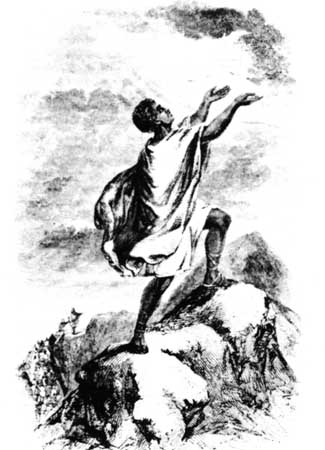
Frontispiece from the 1830 edition of David Walker's Appeal

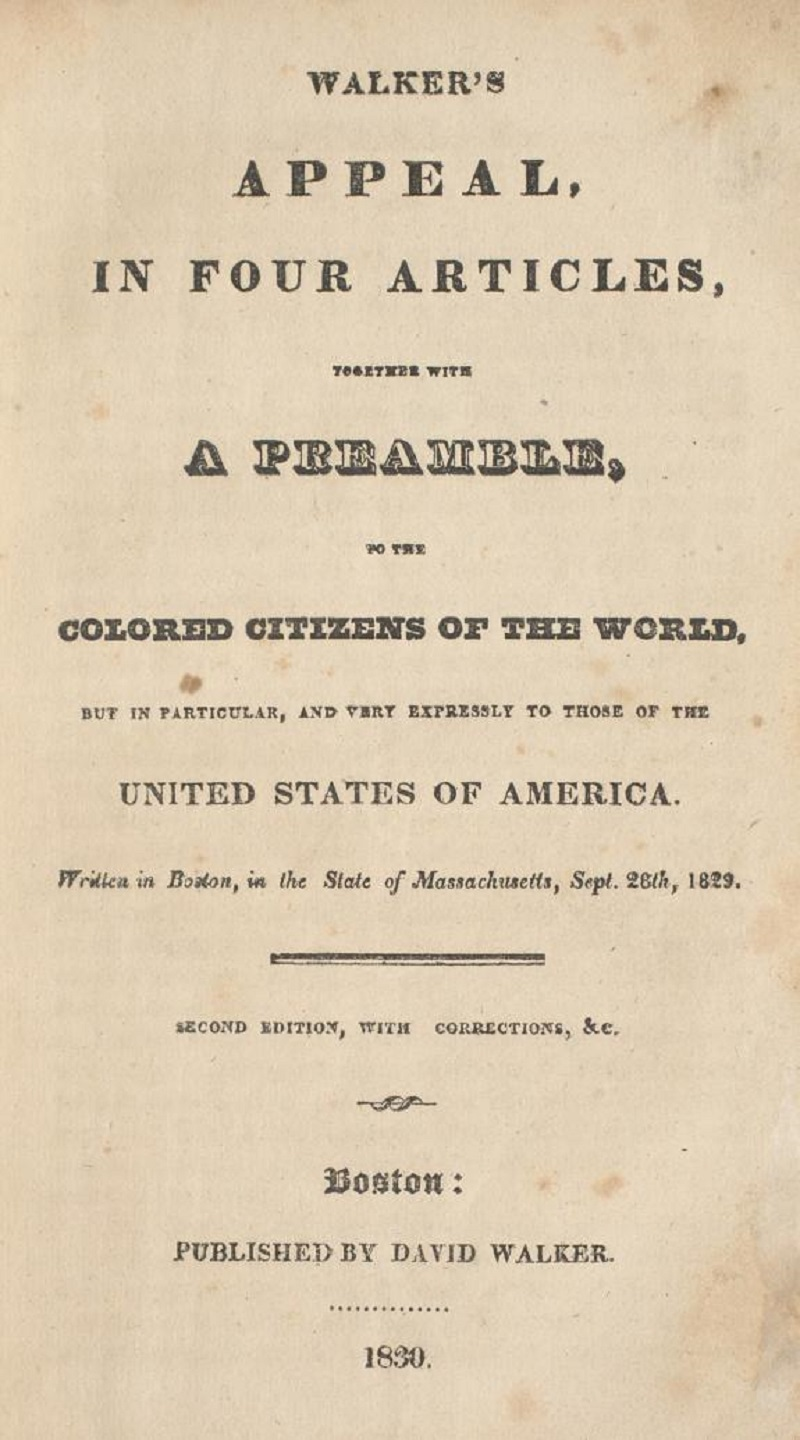
Title page of the 2nd edition of Walker's Appeal...to the Colored Citizens of the World

In September 1829, Walker published his appeal to Black people (enslaved or free), entitled Walker's Appeal, in Four Articles; Together with a Preamble, to the Colored Citizens of the World, but in Particular, and Very Expressly, to Those of the United States of America, Written in Boston, State of Massachusetts, September 28, 1829. The first edition is quite rare; a second and then a third edition appeared in 1830. Walker's second edition, of 1830, expressed his views even more strongly than the first edition. Walker appealed to his readers to take an active role in fighting their oppression, regardless of the risk, and to press white Americans to realize that slavery was morally and religiously repugnant.

The Appeal was semi-forgotten by 1848; a great deal of other abolitionist writing, much inspired by Walker, had appeared in those 18 years. It received a new life with its reprinting in 1848 by the black minister Henry Highland Garnet, who in another 17 years would be the first Black man ever to address the U.S. Congress. Garnet included the first biography of David Walker, and a similarly themed speech of his own, his "Address to the Slaves of the United States of America", which was perceived as so radical that it was rejected for publication when delivered, in 1843. The abolitionist John Brown played a role in getting the volume of Garnet printed.

=== Core issues ===
==== Racism ====
Walker challenged the racism of the early 19th century. He specifically targeted groups such as the American Colonization Society, which sought to deport all free and freed black people from the United States to a colony in Africa (this was how Liberia was established). He wrote against published assertions of black inferiority by the late President Thomas Jefferson, who died three years before Walker's pamphlet was published. Walker also focused on the equality of black men throughout his work, Walker's Appeal, in Four Articles, Together With a Preamble to the Colored Citizens of the World, But in Particular and Very Expressly to Those of the United States of America, Written in Boston, State of Massachusetts, September 28, 1829 "But is Mr.Jefferson's assertions true? viz. "that it is unfortunate for us that our Creator has been pleased to make us black." We will not take his say so, for the fact. The world will have an opportunity to see whether it is unfortunate for us, that our Creator made us darker than the whites." Walker also explained: "We are MEN, as well as other people; to them, I say, that unless we refute Mr. Jefferson's arguments respecting us, we will only establish them." This again is another call for the black community to take a stand against discrimination from whites."

He rejected the white assumption in the United States that dark skin was a sign of inferiority and lesser humanity. He challenged critics to show him "a page of history, either sacred or profane, on which a verse can be found, which maintains that the Egyptians heaped the insupportable insult upon the children of Israel, by telling them that they were not of the human family", referring to the period when they were enslaved in Egypt.

==== Equal rights ====
By the 1820s and '30s, individuals and groups had emerged with degrees of commitment to equal rights for black men and women, but no national anti-slavery movement existed at the time Walker's Appeal was published. As historian Herbert Aptheker wrote:

To be an Abolitionist was not for the faint-hearted. The slaveholders represented for the first half of the nineteenth century the most closely knit and most important single economic unit in the nation, their millions of bondsmen and millions of acres of land comprising an investment of billions of dollars. This economic might had its counterpart in political power, given its possessors dominance within the nation and predominance within the South.

Aptheker was referring to the Slave Power thesis that argued slaveholders used their economic and political influence to control the United States government prior to the American Civil War. The three-fifths clause of the United States Constitution counted three-fifths of the enslaved population of a state towards its representation in Congress and the electoral college; as enslaved people could not vote, this clause amounted to additional representation for large slaveholding states beyond what their free populations would normally warrant. Both the Democratic and Whig parties saw abolitionism as a threat to party unity and opposed efforts to introduce slavery as an issue in national politics. Although white southerners comprised a small minority of the overall U.S. population, 11 of 15 presidents to serve prior to the Civil War came from slaveholding southern families, and none except John Adams and John Quincy Adams was elected without carrying a majority of southern electoral votes.

==== Effects of slavery ====
The Appeal described the pernicious effects of both slavery and the subservience of and discrimination against free black Americans. Walker explains how coloured people in the United States are viewed by saying "that we, (coloured people of the United States of America) are the most wretched, degraded and abject set of beings that ever lived since the world began, and that the white Americans having reduced us to the wretched state of slavery, treat us in that condition more cruel (they being an enlightened and Christian people) than any heathen nation did any people whom it had reduced to our condition." Those outside of slavery were said to need special regulation "because they could not be relied on to regulate themselves and because they might overstep the boundaries society had placed around them."

=== Call to action ===
==== Resist oppression ====
In his Appeal Walker implored the black community to take action against slavery and discrimination. "What gives unity to Walker's polemic," historian Paul Goodman has argued, "is the argument for racial equality and the active part to be taken by black people in achieving it." Literary scholar Chris Apap has echoed these sentiments. The Appeal, Apap has asserted, rejected the notion that the black community should do nothing more than pray for its liberation. Apap has drawn particular attention to a passage of the Appeal in which Walker encourages blacks to "[n]ever make an attempt to gain freedom or natural right, from under our cruel oppressors and murderers, until you see your ways clear; when that hour arrives and you move, be not afraid or dismayed." Apap has interpreted Walker's words as a play on the Biblical injunction to "be not afraid or dismayed." As he points out, "'be not afraid or dismayed' is a direct quote from 2 Chronicles 20.15, where the Israelites are told to 'be not afraid or dismayed' because God would fight the battle for them and save them from their enemies without their having to lift a finger." In the Bible, all the Israelites are expected to do is pray, but Walker asserts that the black community must "move." Apap insists that in prompting his readers to "move", Walker rejected the notion that black people in America should "sit idly by and wait for God to fight their battles — they must (and implicit in Walker's language is the assumption that they will) take action and move to claim what is rightfully and morally theirs."

[W]e colored people of these United States are the most degraded, wretched, and abject set of beings that ever lived since the world began, and I pray God, that none like us ever may live until time shall be no more. They tell us of the Israelites in Egypt, the Helots in Sparta, and of the Roman slaves ...whose sufferings under those ancient and heathen nations, were, in comparison with ours, under this enlightened and Christian nation, no more than a cypher. Or in other words, those heathen nations of antiquity had but little more among them than the name and form of slavery; while wretchedness and endless miseries were reserved, apparently in a phial, to be poured out upon our fathers, ourselves, and our children by Christian Americans.

— Walker's Appeal, page 1 (lightly edited)

Walker's Appeal argued that black Americans had to assume responsibility for themselves if they wanted to overcome oppression. According to historian Peter Hinks, Walker believed that the "key to the uplift of the race was a zealous commitment to the tenets of individual moral improvement: education, temperance, protestant religious practice, regular work habits, and self-regulation." "Walker defined self-determination as an internal condition of freedom. This internal condition of freedom could be the foundation for collective political struggle for liberty."

"America," Walker argued, "is more our country, than it is the whites — we have enriched it with our blood and tears."

==== Education and religion ====
Education and religion were especially important to Walker. Black knowledge, he argued, would not only undermine the assertion that black people were inherently inferior; it would terrify white people. "The bare name of educating the colored people," he wrote, "scares our cruel oppressors almost to death." Those who were educated, Walker argued, had a special obligation to teach their brethren, and literate black people were urged to read his pamphlet to those who could not. As he explained: "[i]t is expected that all colored men, women and children, of every nation, language and tongue under heaven, will try to procure a copy of this Appeal and read it, or get some one to read it to them, for it is designed more particularly for them."

Regarding religion, Walker excoriated the hypocrisy of "pretended preachers of the gospel of my Master, who not only held us as their natural inheritance, but treated us with as much rigor as any Infidel or Deist in the world — just as though they were intent only on taking our blood and groans to glorify the Lord Jesus Christ." It fell upon blacks, he argued, to reject the notion that the Bible sanctioned slavery and urge whites to repent before God could punish them for their wickedness. As historian Sean Wilentz has maintained, Walker, in his Appeal, "offered a version of Christianity that was purged of racist heresies, one which held that God was a God of justice to all His creatures."

There is great work for you to do... You have to prove to the Americans and the world that we are men, and not brutes, as we have been represented, and by millions treated. Remember, to let the aim of your labours among your brethren, and particularly the youths, be the dissemination of education and religion.

— David Walker, Walker's Appeal in Four Articles

=== White Americans ===
==== Comparisons to other nations ====
In the Appeal, Walker criticized white Americans by comparing their position on slavery to other groups. Walker praised the British in the work, arguing that they were

the best friends the coloured people have upon earth. Tho' they have oppressed us a little, and have colonies now in the West Indies, which oppress us sorely,—Yet notwithstanding they have done one hundred times more for the melioration of our condition, than all the other nations of the earth put together. The blacks cannot but respect the English as a nation, notwithstanding they have treated us a little cruel. There is not intelligence black man who knows any thing, but esteems a real English man, let him see in what part of the world he will— for they are the greatest benefactors we have upon earth. We have here and there, in other nations, good friends. But as a nation, the English are our friends."

In contrast, Walker denounced white Americans "with their posturing religiosity and their hollow cant of freedom" to "the lowest reaches of hypocritical infamy".

==== Opportunity for redemption ====
Despite Walker's criticism of the United States, his Appeal did not declare the nation irredeemable. He may have charged white Americans with the sin of turning "colored people of these United States" into "the most degraded, wretched, and abject set of beings that ever lived since the world began", but as historian Sean Wilentz has argued, "even in his bitterest passages Walker did not repudiate... republican principles, or his native country." Walker suggested that white Americans only needed to consider their own purported values to see the error of their ways.

==== Inappropriate benevolent attitudes ====
Walker asserted that white people did not deserve adulation for their willingness to free some slaves. As historian Peter Hinks has explained, Walker argued that "[w]hites gave nothing to blacks upon manumission except the right to exercise the liberty they had immorally prevented them from so doing in the past. They were not giving blacks a gift but rather returning what they had stolen from them and God. To pay respect to whites as the source of freedom was thus to blaspheme God by denying that he was the source of all virtues and the only one with whom one was justified in having a relationship of obligation and debt."

=== Black nationalism ===
Walker has often been regarded as an abolitionist with Black nationalist views, in large measure because he envisioned a future for Black people that included self-rule. As he wrote in the Appeal: "Our sufferings will come to an end, in spite of all the Americans this side of eternity. Then we will want all the learning and talents, and perhaps more, to govern ourselves."

Scholars such as historian Sterling Stuckey have remarked upon the connection between Walker's Appeal and black nationalism. In his 1972 study of The Ideological Origins of Black Nationalism, Stuckey suggested that Walker's Appeal "would become an ideological foundation... for Black Nationalist theory." Though some historians have said that Stuckey overstated the extent to which Walker contributed to the creation of a black nation, Thabiti Asukile, in a 1999 article on "The All-Embracing Black Nationalist Theories of David Walker's Appeal", defended Stuckey's interpretation. Asukile writes:

Though scholars may continue to debate this, it would seem hard to disprove that the later advocates of black nationalism in America, who advocated a separate nation-state based on geographical boundaries during the nineteenth and twentieth centuries, would not have been able to trace certain ideological concepts to Walker's writings. Stuckey's interpretation of the Appeal as a theoretical black nationalist document is a polemical crux for some scholars who aver that David Walker desired to live in a multicultural America. Those who share this view must consider that Stuckey does not limit his discourse on the Appeal to a black nationalism narrowly defined, but rather to a range of sentiments and concerns. Stuckey's concept of a black nationalist theory rooted in African slave folklore in America is an original and pioneering one, and his intellectual insights are valuable to a progressive rewriting of African-American history and culture.

This country is as much ours as it is the whites, whether they will admit it now or not, they will see and believe it by and by.

— David Walker, Appeal to the Colored Citizens of the World, Article IV

=== Distribution ===
Walker distributed his pamphlet through black communication networks along the Atlantic coast, which included free and enslaved black civil rights activists, laborers, black church and revivalist networks, contacts with free black benevolent societies, and maroon communities.

=== Reaction ===
==== Efforts to prevent distribution ====
Southern officials worked to prevent the Appeal from reaching its residents. Black people in Charleston and New Orleans were arrested for distributing the pamphlet, while authorities in Savannah, Georgia, instituted a ban on the disembarkation of black seamen (Negro Seamen Act). This was because Southern governmental entities, particularly in port cities, were concerned about the arrival and dissemination of information that they wanted to keep from black people, both free and enslaved. Various Southern governmental bodies labeled the Appeal seditious and imposed harsh penalties on those who circulated it. Despite such efforts, Walker's pamphlet had circulated widely by early 1830. Having failed to contain the Appeal, Southern officials criticized both the pamphlet and its author. Newspapers like the Richmond Enquirer railed against what it called Walker's "monstrous slander" of the region. Outrage over the Appeal even led Georgia to announce an award of $10,000 to anyone who could hand over Walker alive, and $1,000 if dead.

==== Immediate significance ====
Walker's Appeal did not gain the favor of most abolitionists or free black people because its message was considered too radical.

That said, a handful of white antislavery advocates were radicalized by the pamphlet. The Boston Evening Transcript noted in 1830 that some black people regarded the Appeal "as if it were a star in the east guiding them to freedom and emancipation." White Southerners' fears about a black-led challenge to slavery—fears the Appeal stoked—came to pass just a year later in Nat Turner's Rebellion, which inspired them to adopt harsher laws in an attempt to subdue and control slaves and free black people.

William Lloyd Garrison, one of the most influential American abolitionists, began publishing The Liberator in January 1831, not long after the Appeal was published. Garrison, who believed slaveowners would be punished by God, rejected the violence Walker advocated but recognized that slaveowners were courting disaster by refusing to free their slaves. "Every sentence that they write — every word that they speak — every resistance that they make, against foreign oppression, is a call upon their slaves to destroy them," Garrison wrote.

Walker's Appeal and the slave rebellion led by Nat Turner in Virginia in 1831 struck fear into the hearts of slave owners. Though there is no evidence to suggest that the Appeal specifically informed or inspired Turner, it could have, since the two events were just a few years apart; white people were panicked about the possibility of future insurrections. Southern states passed laws restricting free black people and slaves. Many white people in Virginia and neighboring North Carolina believed that Turner was inspired by Walker's Appeal or other abolitionist literature.

==== Lasting influence ====
Walker influenced Frederick Douglass, Nat Turner, William Lloyd Garrison, Martin Luther King Jr., and Malcolm X. Echoes of his Appeal can be heard, for example, in Douglass's 1852 speech, "The Meaning of the Fourth of July for the Negro":

For it is not light that is needed, but fire; it is not the gentle shower, but thunder. We need the storm, the whirlwind, and the earthquake. The feeling of the nation must be quickened; the conscience of the nation must be roused; the propriety of the nation must be startled; the hypocrisy of the nation must be exposed; and its crimes against God and man must be proclaimed and denounced.

Historian Herbert Aptheker has noted that

Walker's Appeal is the first sustained written assault upon slavery and racism to come from a black man in the United States. This was the main source of its overwhelming power in its own time; this is the source of the great relevance and enormous impact that remain in it, deep as we are in the twentieth century. Never before or since was there a more passionate denunciation of the hypocrisy of the nation as a whole — democratic and fraternal and equalitarian and all the other words. And Walker does this not as one who hates the country but rather as one who hates the institutions which disfigure it and make it a hissing in the world.

== Death ==
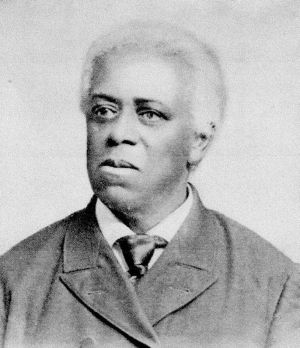
Edward G. Walker (1830–1901), son of David Walker, one of the first two black men elected to the Massachusetts State Legislature

Just five years after he arrived in Boston, Walker died in the summer of 1830. Though rumors suggested that he had been poisoned, Walker died a natural death from tuberculosis, as listed in his death record. The disease was prevalent and Walker's only daughter, Lydia Ann, had died from it the week before Walker himself died. Walker was buried in a South Boston cemetery for blacks. His probable grave site remains unmarked.

When Walker died, his wife was unable to keep up the annual payments to George Parkman for the purchase of their house. She subsequently lost their home, an eventuality Walker himself had, in a sense, predicted in his Appeal:

But I must, really, observe that in this very city, when a man of color dies, if he owned any real estate it most generally falls into the hands of some white persons. The wife and children of the deceased may weep and lament if they please, but the estate will be kept snug enough of its white possessor.

His son Edward G. Walker (also known as Edwin G. Walker) was born after Walker's death, and in 1866 would become the first black man elected to the Massachusetts State Legislature.

== Legacy ==
As noted from the numerous sources, historians consider David Walker a major abolitionist and inspirational figure in American history.

- The Library of Congress had an exhibit, Free Blacks in the Antebellum Period, which noted Walker's significance, along with that of other key black abolitionists: "Free people of color like Richard Allen, Frederick Douglass, Sojourner Truth, David Walker, and Prince Hall earned national reputations for themselves by writing, speaking, organizing, and agitating on behalf of their enslaved compatriots."
- The National Park Service has walking tours developed for the Boston African American National Historic Site, including the black Beacon Hill community. The comprehensive narratives include discussion of David Walker, who was integral to the black neighborhood and city activists. An online version of the tour is also available.

== See also ==
  - List of African-American abolitionists

== Sources ==
- Abzug, Robert H. (January 1970). "The Influence of Garrisonian Abolitionists' Fears of Slave Violence on the Antislavery Argument, 1829–40". The Journal of Negro History. 55 (55): 15–26. doi:10.2307/2716541. JSTOR 2716541. S2CID 149609151.
- Apap, Chris (June 2011). "'Let no man of us budge one step': David Walker and the Rhetoric African American Emplacement". Early American Literature. 46 (2): 319–350. doi:10.1353/eal.2011.0011. S2CID 161478007.
- Aptheker, Herbert (1965). "One Continual Cry": David Walker's Appeal to the Colored Citizens of the World (1829–1830): Its Setting and Its Meaning. Humanities Press.
- Asukile, Thabiti (1999). "The All-Embracing Black Nationalist Theories of David Walker's Appeal". The Black Scholar. 29 (4): 16–24. doi:10.1080/00064246.1999.11430981.
- Crockett, Hasan (2001). The Incendiary Pamphlet: David Walker's Appeal in Georgia. The Journal of Negro History (86): 305–318.
- Eaton, Clement (August 1936). "A Dangerous Pamphlet in the Old South". Journal of Southern History (2): 512–534.
- Garnet, Henry Highland (1848). Walker's Appeal, with a Brief Sketch of His Life. New York: J.H. Tobitt.
- Goodman, Paul (1998). Of One Blood: Abolitionism and the Origins of Racial Equality. Berkeley: University of California Press.
- Hahn, Steven (2009). The Political Worlds of Slavery and Freedom. Cambridge, Mass.: Harvard University Press.
- Harding, Vincent (1981). There Is A River: The Black Struggle for Freedom in America. New York: Vintage Books.
- Harris, Leonard (1999), "Honor and Insurrection or A Short Story about why John Brown (with David Walker's Spirit) was right and Frederick Douglass (with Benjamin Banneker's Spirit) was Wrong", in Bill Lawson; Frank Kirkland (eds.), Frederick Douglass: A Critical Reader, Malden, MA: Blackwell Publishers, pp. 227–242
- Hinks, Peter P., ed. (2000), "Introduction and editor's note", David Walker's Appeal to the Colored Citizens of the World, University Park, Penn: Pennsylvania State University Press, pp. xi–xliv, ISBN 0271019948
- Hinks, Peter P. (1996). To Awaken My Afflicted Brethren: David Walker and the Problem of Antebellum Slave Resistance. University Park, Penn.: Pennsylvania State University Press. ISBN 978-0-271-01578-1.
- Horne, Gerald; Bedell, Madelon; Dodson, Howard, eds. (1988). Thinking and Rethinking U.S. History. New York: Council on Interracial Books for Children.
- Horton, James Oliver (June 1976). "Generations of Protest: Black Families and Social Reform in Ante-Bellum Boston". The New England Quarterly. 49 (2): 242–256. doi:10.2307/364501. JSTOR 364501.
- Horton, James Oliver; Horton, Lois E. (1997). In Hope of Liberty: Culture, Community, and Protest Among Northern Free Blacks, 1700–1860. Oxford University Press.
- Horton, James Oliver, ed. (2006). Slavery and Public History: The Tough Stuff of American History. New York: The New Press.
- Johnson, Charles; Smith, Patricia; WGBH Series Research Team (1998). Africans in America: America's Journey Through Slavery. New York: Harcourt, Brace and Company.
- Mayer, Henry (1998). All on Fire: William Lloyd Garrison and The Abolition of Slavery. New York: St. Martin's Press. ISBN 9780312187408.
- McHenry, Elizabeth (2002). Forgotten Readers: Recovering the Lost History of African American Literary Societies. Durham, N.C.: Duke University Press.
- Mitchell, Verner (2002), "David Walker, African Rights, and Liberty", in Trotman, James C. (ed.), Multiculturalism: Roots and Reality, Bloomington, Ind.: Indiana University Press
- Sesay, Chernoh Momodu (2006). Freemasons of Color: Prince Hall, Revolutionary Black Boston, and the Origins of Black Freemasonry, 1770—1807 (Thesis). Northwestern University.
- Wilentz, Sean (1995), "Introduction", David Walker's Appeal to the Colored Citizens of the World, New York: Hill and Wang, pp. vii–xxiii
- Zinn, Howard (2003). A People's History of the American States: 1492 to the Present. New York: Harper Collins Publishers.
