= New England Anti-Slavery Society =

American abolitionist organization

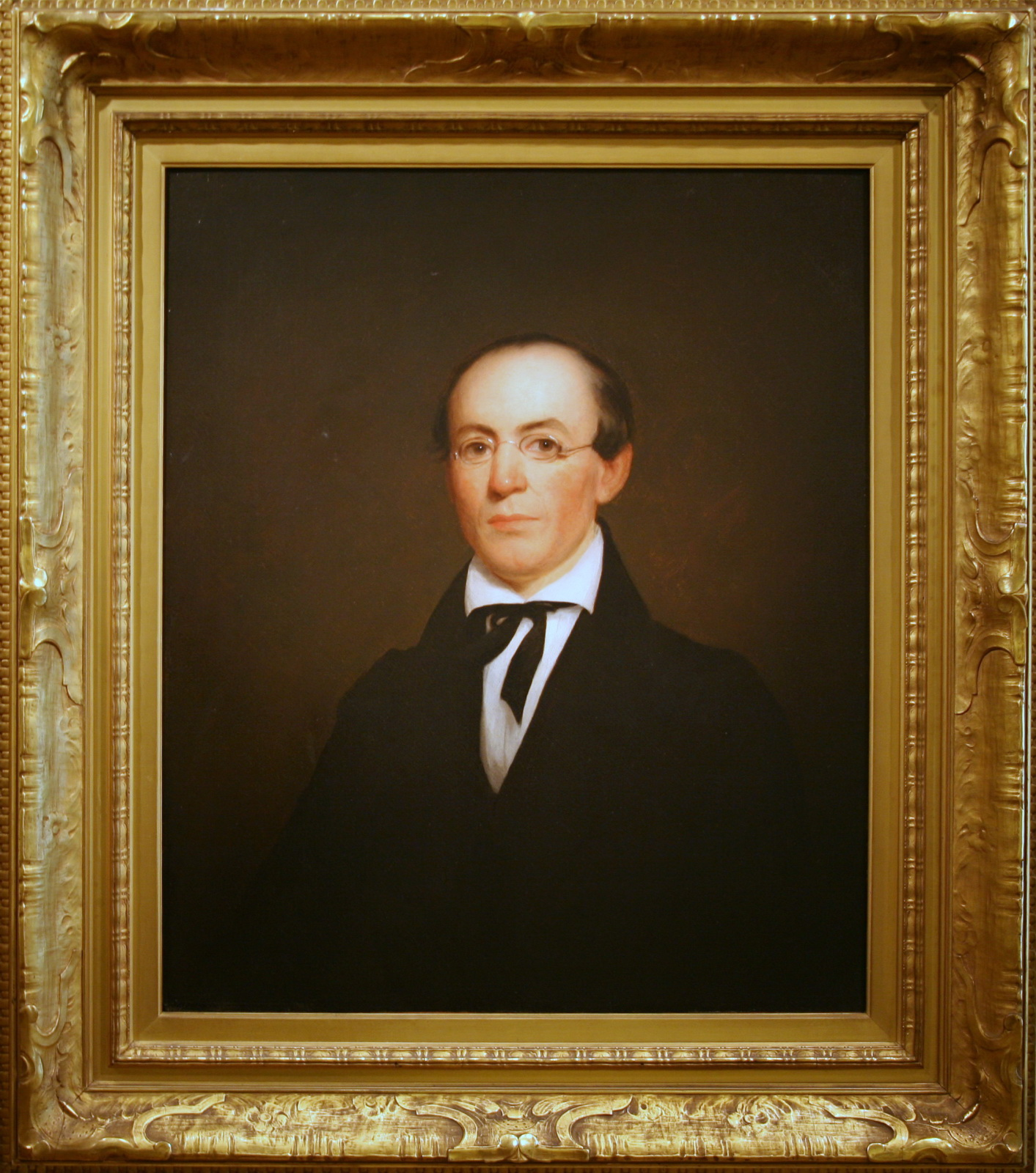
William Lloyd Garrison, 1833, Oil on wood by Nathaniel Jocelyn.

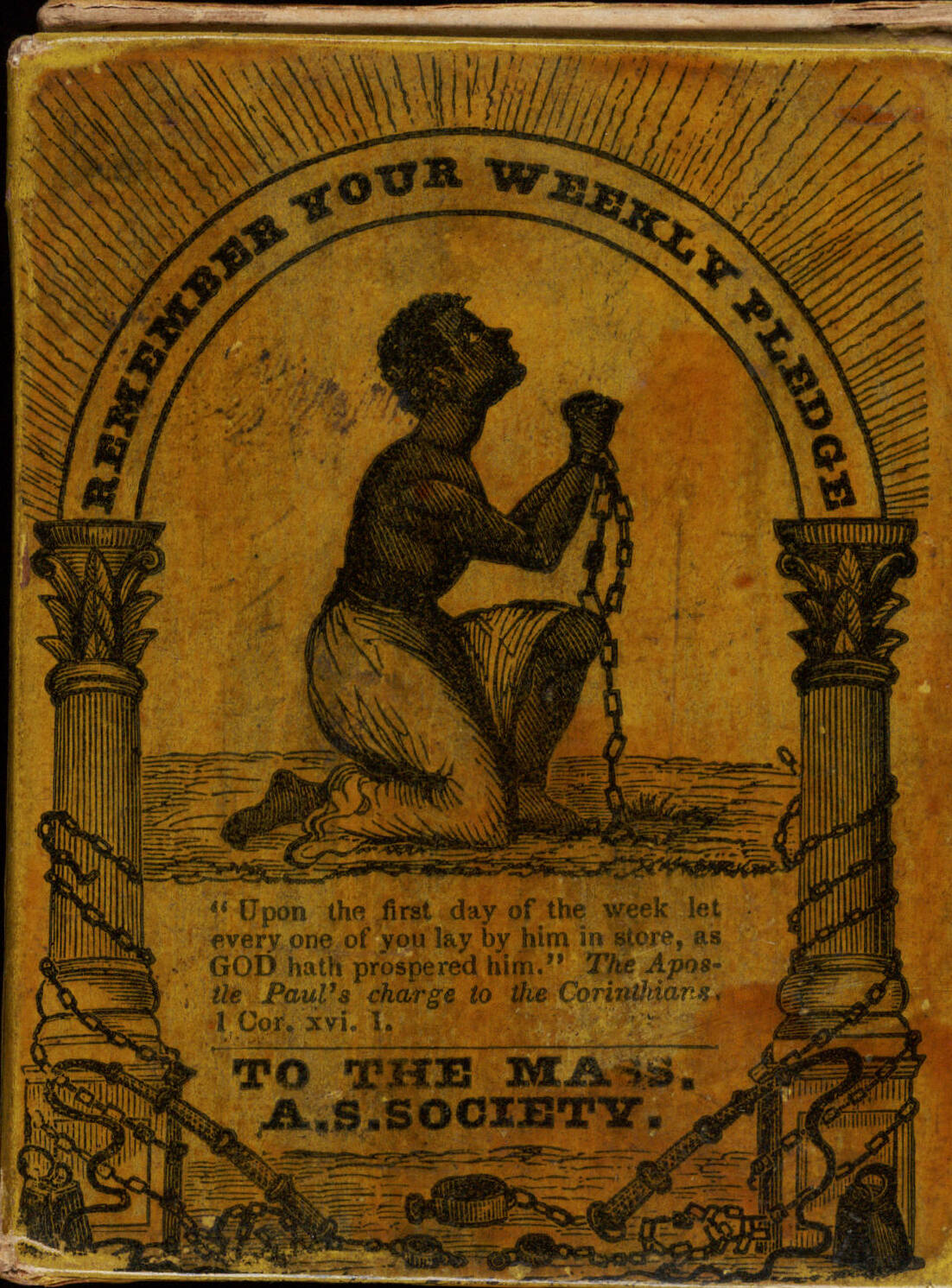
Remember Your Weekly Pledge, collection box for Massachusetts Anti-Slavery Society. Set aside in the home, the box was designed to remind members to make their weekly contribution. Circa 1850

The New England Anti-Slavery Society (1831–1837) was formed by William Lloyd Garrison on January 6, 1832, at the African Meeting House in Boston.

Based in Boston, Massachusetts, members of the New England Anti-slavery Society supported immediate abolition and viewed slavery as immoral and non-Christian (sinful). It was particularly opposed to the American Colonization Society, which proposed sending African Americans to Africa. According to biographer, Lindsay Swift, the society was established under the idea of "immediate and unconditional emancipation." Garrison and the twelve other members—often referred to as the "twelve pioneers" rejected the "colonization" or "gradualist" ideas, which sought to slow down the transition of the enslaved people or those who were forced removal to Africa via the American Colonization Society. Swift emphasizes that the weather surrounding the foundation of the society was a dark and cold night, symbolizing the rejection from others the group expected from the Boston establishment. The "twelve pioneers," although mostly white men, represented radical issues from the era's conservative reformers. They demanded "immediatism" and declared that any delay in the efforts of ending slavery was a sin against God himself.

Instead the NEASS utilized "moral suasion" to argue that slavery was dehumanizing and a religious sin. To spread this message, Garrison and the other members used pamphlets, newspapers, lectures, and Garrison's own publication,The Liberator to persuade readers and spread the news of a new anti-slavery community. The societies ideas meant to change people's mind and hearts rather than seeking immediate political attention. The society focused on media, utilizing The Liberator to amplify their resolutions and provide a safe space for voices that were ignored by mainstream press. Their strategy was rooted in the belief that if the "sinful nature" of slavery was shown to everyone publicly, a conversion or a change of heart of the nation would follow, making political legislation a byproduct of moral growth and change.

The founding meeting took place on January 1, 1831, in the vestry of the Belknap Street Church. (Some sources list the date as January 1, 1832.) Garrison was the principal founder. The other founding members were: Benjamin Bierly of Amesbury, Massachusetts, Reverend Elijah Blanchard, Dr. Gamaliel Bradford, Elizabeth B. Chase, Joshua Easton, also a member of the Massachusetts General Colored Association, Charles Theodore Follen, Reverend Henry Grew, Joshua Coffin, Reverend Cyrus Pitt Grosvenor, Ellis Gray Loring, Captain Jonas Parker of Reading, Massachusetts, Reverend Perry of Mendon, Massachusetts, Reverend Amos August Phelps, Reverend Aaron Pickett of Reading, Massachusetts, Samuel Edmund Sewall, Horace Wakefield, Amasa Walker, and a Reverend Yates.

The society sponsored lecturers or "agents" who traveled throughout the New England area, speaking in local churches or halls, and also selling abolitionist tracts or The Liberator. Whenever possible, the Society's agents would also encourage the formation of local anti-slavery societies. By 1833 there were 47 local societies in ten northern states, 33 of them in New England. The society also sponsored mass mobilizations such as yearly anti-slavery conventions and celebrations of July 4 or — preferred by those who believed celebrating July 4 was unacceptable since the U.S. Constitution accepted slavery — the Anniversary of the Abolition of Slavery in the West Indies, August 1.

John Levy, "a colored gentleman" from Lowell, decries insufficient involvement of free Negroes in the struggle. Garrison, Birney, Burleigh, Henry Stanton, and other stalwarts speak at length.

== Key Conventions and Growth ==
The early development of the society was marked by pivotal gatherings, such as the 1834 New England Anti-Slavery Society Convention. During these proceedings, the Society sought to reject the American Colonization Society, labeling the removal of African Americans as "un-Christian" or "unrighteous." The 1834 records the harsh language of the spokesperson, who used the conventions to draft resolutions that challenged the biblical and legal justifications for slavery. The meetings served as the base foundation for the known American Anti-Slavery Society, moving away from a regional New England concern to a nation-wide fight. This era also sought the shift of members of the NEASS from white reformers to a more intersectional movement. Additionally, they started to work with the Massachusetts General Colored Association as well as Thomas Dalton, which helped the NEASS to expand with black activist organizations to create a more united front.

The 1834 records highlight the "Agency System," a method of sending traveling lectures to local chapters across the New England States to recruit members. This system was the society's primary focus for expansion. During the debates of the early 1830s, the society committed to "peaceful and lawful means," choosing to switch to political pressure and power to get more attention. They sent mass petitions to Congress as threats. They specifically targeted the abolition of slavery in the District of Columbia rather than supporting violent rebellions.

== Massachusetts General Colored Association ==
In January 1833, Thomas Dalton, president of the Massachusetts General Colored Association, led a successful petition to merge with the New England Anti-Slavery Society. Separate black anti-slavery societies had already existed in Massachusetts, New York, Ohio, Connecticut, and New Jersey, however, a strong feeling against the organization of separate anti-slavery societies had been emerging.

Together they organized anti-slavery conventions and speaking programs throughout New England.

Sometime after Joshua Easton was sent as a delegate to the New England society in 1833, African Americans were granted full membership in the organization.

== American Anti-Slavery Society ==
In 1833, Garrison and Arthur Tappan expanded this society and formed the American Anti-Slavery Society. The American Anti-Slavery Society, however, attempted to create state-based organizations under the umbrella of its executive committee. At first the New England Anti-Slavery Society and the American Society worked together, with the New England Society becoming an auxiliary in 1834.

== Integration with Black Activism ==
A defining moment in the society's growth was moving from a white-led group to a more diverse society. While many contemporary organizations remained segregated, the NEASS worked to seek out partnership with established Black leadership to support their causes. In 1833, the society merged with the Massachusetts General Colored Association, a move facilitated by activists like Thomas Dalton. This was a huge step for the 1830s; it ensured that the NEASS was not just white reformers, but a coalition that granted roles and inclusion of African Americans. The collaboration provided the NEASS with essential leverage and credibility which linked their moral arguments to the lived experience of the free Black communities in the North who were fighting for their own civil right and freedom of their Southern families.

== Massachusetts Anti-Slavery Society ==
In 1838, however, the New England Society gave up its regional jurisdiction and reorganized into the Massachusetts Anti-Slavery Society. The society took a proactive role in advocating for legislation against new slave codes and laws, particularly within Massachusetts, including publishing treatises related to proposals to outlaw or penalize those participating in the activities and formation of societies relating to abolition and anti-slavery activities.

Annual meetings were held in Boston at Julien Hall, Melodeon, and Tremont Temple. Officers included James N. Buffum, Francis Jackson, Wendell Phillips, Parker Pillsbury, and Edmund Quincy. Lecturers affiliated with the society included William Wells Brown, Frederick Douglass, Samuel Joseph May, and Charles Lenox Remond. Joel W. Lewis was the chairman in 1840.

The New England Anti-Slavery Society held conventions in:

- Boston, Massachusetts, May 24, 25, 26, 1836
- Boston, Massachusetts, May 30, 31 and June 1 and 2, 1837

The Massachusetts Anti-Slavery Society held conventions in:

- Worcester, Massachusetts, October 1840
- Nantucket, Massachusetts, 1841

Following the Civil War the Massachusetts Anti-Slavery Society took up the cause of racial equality.

== Evolution and The Free Produce Movement ==
By the late 1830s, the group's influence expanded larger than the Massachusetts Anti-Slavery Society. As the organization matured, it became influential to other rising associations during the American abolitionist movement, providing help that would eventually dominate Northern political ideology. However, by the late 1850s, the tone of the organization shifted from religious and moral arguments to radical political dissent. Figures like Wendell Phillips began to frame slavery as more than just a mortal stain; they argued it was a "dangerous" threat to the "liberties of the country as a whole."

In its final years before the Civil War, the society championed the "Free Produce Movement," a consumer-based activism boycott. Members encourage a boycott of goods produced by enslave labor, including cotton and cane sugar. By 1859, the rhetoric changed significantly; many members viewed the U.S. Constitution as a "compact with hell" as long as it protected the institution of slavery, marking the society's transition from religious reformers to radical political agitators.

== The Free Produce Movement ==
In the final decade of the Civil War, the society increasingly emphasized the "Free Produce Movement." This strategy shifted the focus from the pulpit to the marketplace, urging members to practice consumer-based activism. By encouraging a total boycott of goods produced by enslaved labor—specifically cotton clothing and cane sugar—the NEASS sought to break the North's economic complicity in the slave system. They promoted "free produce" stores that only sold goods created by free labor, arguing that every purchase made by slaves was a direct financial contribution to the institution of slavery. This marked a transition from purely "moral suasion" to a form of direct economic warfare against the slave system of the South.

== Radicalization and The Constitution ==
By the May 1859 convention, the rhetoric reached its most radical peak. The political landscape, shaped events like the Fugitive Slave Act, led many members to abandon hope in traditional legal revolutions. Reports from the 1859 convention describe a "frightful torrent of abuse" directed at "recreant senators" and the President. It was during this period that the society's leadership famously declared the U.S. Constitution to be a "compact with hell" and a "covenant with death." They argued that the Union itself was illegitimate as long as it protected the property right of slaveholders. The transformation from religious reformers to radical political agitators reflected the growing belief that the national conflict was going in a different direction, positioning the NEASS as a revolutionary force before the American Civil War.

== See also ==
- Massachusetts General Colored Association, which joined the New England Anti-Slavery Society in 1833
- World Anti-Slavery Convention of 1840
