= William Cooper Nell =

American journalist (1816–1874)

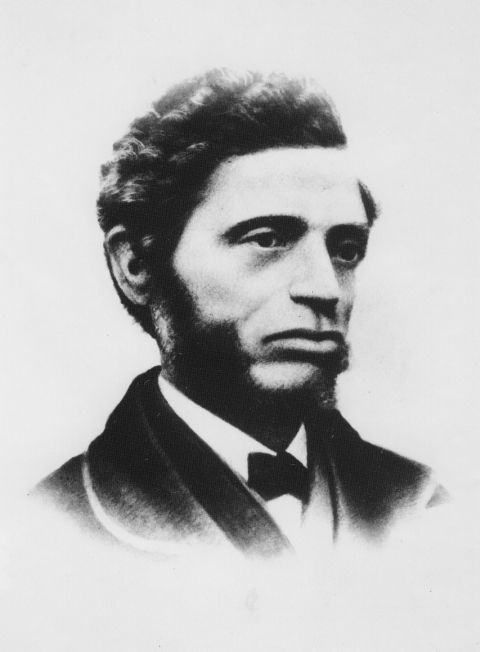
- Born: December 16, 1816; Boston, Massachusetts, U.S.
- Died: May 25, 1874 (aged 57); Boston, Massachusetts, U.S.
- Occupations: Journalist, author, civil servant
- Spouse: Frances Ann (Ames) Nell
- Children: William Cooper Nell, Jr.; Frank Ames Nell
- Parent(s): William G. and Louise (Cooper) Nell

William Cooper Nell (December 16, 1816 – May 25, 1874) was an American abolitionist, journalist, publisher, author, and civil servant of Boston, Massachusetts, who worked for the integration of schools and public facilities in the state. Writing for abolitionist newspapers The Liberator and The North Star, he helped publicize the anti-slavery cause. He published the North Star from 1847 to 1851, moving temporarily to Rochester, New York.

He also helped found the New England Freedom Association in the early 1840s, and later the Committee of Vigilance, to aid refugee slaves. The Committee of Vigilance supported resistance to the Fugitive Slave Act of 1850, which had increased penalties against even citizens in free states who aided refugee slaves.

Nell's short histories, Services of Colored Americans in the Wars of 1776 and 1812 (1851) and The Colored Patriots of the American Revolution (1855), were the first studies published about African Americans. He is noted as the first African American to serve in the federal civil service, where he worked in the post office.

== Biography ==
=== Early years ===
Nell was born in 1816 in Boston, Massachusetts, to Louise Cooper, from Brookline, and William Guion Nell, from Charleston, South Carolina. His father was an important figure in the abolitionist movement, having helped to create the Massachusetts General Colored Association in the 1820s. Nell encountered racial discrimination as a student. In 1829, he was passed over for an award given to excellent students upon graduation from the Abiel Smith School, apparently because of his ethnicity, and was excluded from a celebratory dinner. He managed to attend as a waiter. The award was financially supported by the estate of anti-slavery advocate Benjamin Franklin. The school committee instead gave Nell The Life of Ben Franklin, an autobiography.

=== Abolitionist work ===
Inspired by the founding of William Lloyd Garrison's newspaper, The Liberator, William Cooper Nell decided to challenge race-based discrimination and segregation, as his father had done. Nell was particularly interested in encouraging the intellectual and social well-being of young African Americans. He was dedicated to integration and opposed the separate abolitionist organizations for blacks and whites. In his devotion to integration, he dismantled the abolitionist Massachusetts General Colored Association, which had been organized by his father.

Nell studied law in the early 1830s. He was never admitted to the bar because he would not swear allegiance to the Constitution of the United States, as he believed it was a pro-slavery document. He was influenced by the opinions of Garrison and Wendell Phillips. Around this time, Nell also began his association with Garrison and The Liberator. This connection would continue until the paper closed in 1865. Nell fought for the ideals of Garrison throughout the abolitionist campaign.

Nell began working against the existing system of segregated schools for black and white children in Massachusetts, gathering 2,000 signatures from the black community on a petition to the state legislature. In 1855, Nell and his colleagues gained a victory; segregation was ended in Boston schools. Nell also encouraged young African Americans to learn outside of the public school system. Garrison said of him, "Perhaps no one has done so much—certainly no one has done more—for the intellectual and moral improvement of our colored youth."

In 1843, Nell continued his crusade against segregation within the abolitionist movement by denouncing the Buffalo National Negro Convention. He claimed they served as, and promoted, exactly the type of separate abolitionism he was fighting against.

He was influential in beginning the New England Freedom Association, an all-black organization that helped fugitive slaves in the North. In this case, Nell supported an African-American group since he believed its cause was closer to the hearts of blacks than whites. Nell publicized the Freedom Association's direct aid to fugitive slaves as well as the abolitionist cause. He also fought for higher education and encouraged the improvement of young African Americans; with John T. Hilton, he founded the Adelphia Union and the Young Men's Literary Society of Boston.

He was a leader in campaigns to desegregate public facilities in Boston: he succeeded in gaining desegregation of the Boston railroad in 1843, and, in 1853, performance halls in the city.

=== Later efforts ===
Nell served as publisher to Frederick Douglass' The North Star, from late 1847 until 1851, moving temporarily to Rochester, New York, during this period. He also joined New York anti-slavery societies and founded a literary society. He ended his work with Douglass during the latter's feud with his close friend Garrison. Nell ended all contact with Douglass finally in 1853 when the leader advocated the Colored National Council and the Manual Labor School, which represented the types of segregated institutions which Nell detested. Douglass attacked Nell and other leading black activists who supported Garrison, including Robert Purvis of Philadelphia and Charles Lenox Remond.

In 1850, Nell had run as a Free Soil candidate for the Massachusetts state legislature, but lost. Passage of the federal Fugitive Slave Law of 1850 required state law enforcement, even in free states, to aid in the recapture of refugee slaves and it increased penalties for those citizens who helped slaves. Nell was inspired to renew his fight against slavery. He created the Committee of Vigilance in Boston, whose members swore to aid escaped slaves. It served a similar purpose to the Freedom Association of 1842, but was illegal under the new federal law. Nell also supported the Underground Railroad, which had numerous supporters to help slaves reach freedom in the North, with some going on to Canada.

In 1851, Nell and other petitioners requested money from the state legislature to commission a monument to Crispus Attucks, one of the first martyrs of the American Revolution. When Boston commissioned a major monument to the Boston Massacre to be installed on the Common in 1888, the fallen Attucks was featured in it prominently.

A few years later, in 1855, Nell achieved another success when the legislature finally abolished segregation in public schools. In recognition of Nell's efforts on this issue, a commemorative dinner was held to honor him. During 1855, Garrison's The Liberator employed Nell to journey around the Midwest and study African-American anti-slavery efforts. He attended a graduation at Oberlin College, appreciating the easy relations among the integrated students.

Nell was outraged by the US Supreme Court ruling in Dred Scott v. Sandford ruling in 1857, which said that ethnic Africans had no legal standing in the United States as they were not considered citizens under the Constitution. In 1858 he organized a memorial celebration of Crispus Attucks at Faneuil Hall, a traditional site of commemoration, and worked with others to have a "Crispus Attucks Day" designated in Boston. He reminded people of the participation of African Americans in the fight for independence from Great Britain, and helped have Attucks recognized in the commemoration of the Boston Massacre. That same year, Nell organized the Convention of Colored Citizens of New England. While it was contrary to his earlier dislike of segregated abolitionist efforts, he argued that the Scott decision was such an insult to blacks that they needed to act separately.

In his time apart from the newspapers, Nell worked for legislation to allow blacks into the Massachusetts militia. He did not succeed in this but lived to see blacks serve in United States armed forces during the Civil War.

=== Civil War and later years ===
With the outbreak of the Civil War, Nell worked to have blacks accepted as soldiers in the Union Army. In 1861, he was hired as a postal clerk in Boston, earning the distinction of being the first African American to hold a federal civilian post. On April 14, 1869, Nell married Frances Ann Ames, the 26-year-old daughter of Philip Osgood Ames, a barber from Nashua, New Hampshire, and his wife Lucy B. (Drake) Ames. The Nells had two sons: William Cooper Jr. (1870–92) and Frank Ames (1872–81).

Nell died of a stroke in 1874 at the age of 58. His wife survived him by more than twenty years, dying in Nashua, New Hampshire, on September 13, 1895.

== Legacy and honors ==
The William Cooper Nell House, now a private residence in Beacon Hill, was designated a National Historic Landmark in recognition for his contributions to the abolition movement. He lived at that home in the 1860s.

== Works by Nell ==
- Services of Colored Americans in the Wars of 1776 and 1812. New York: Printed by Prentiss & Sawyer. 1851. OCLC 34068998.
- Introductions by Harriet Beecher Stowe and Wendell Phillips, The Colored Patriots of the American Revolution: With Sketches of Several Distinguished Colored Persons, Boston: Robert F. Wallcut, 1855.
- Triumph of equal school rights in Boston: proceedings of the presentation meeting held in Boston, December 17, 1855, including addresses by John T. Hilton, Wm. C. Nell, Charles W. Slack, Wendell Phillips, Wm. Lloyd Garrison, Charles Lennox Remond. Boston: R.F. Wallcut. 1856. OCLC 24988712.
- Faneuil Hall Commemorative Festival, March 5th, 1858. Protest against the Dred Scott "Decision." ... Boston: E.L. Balch. 1858. OCLC 79964803.
- Boston massacre, March 5th, 1770 : the day which history selects as the dawn of the American Revolution. Commemorative festival, at Faneuil Hall, Friday, March 5, 1858. Protest against the Dred Scott decision ... Boston: E.L. Balch. 1858. OCLC 20770632.
- The Centennial Anniversary of the Boston Massacre, March 5th, 1770: The Day Which History Selects As the Dawn of the American Revolution, Signalized by the Patriotic Leadership and Martyrdom of Crispus Attucks Will Be Commemorated on Monday Evening, March 7th, 1870 in Joy Street Church. Boston: s.n. 1858. OCLC 83299260.
- Nell, William Cooper (1860). Ninetieth Anniversary of the Boston Massacre, March 5, 1770.: The Day Which History Has Selected As the Dawn of the American Revolution. Commemorative Meeting, at the Menonian, on Monday Ev'g, March 5th, 1860. Boston: s.n. OCLC 191232677.
- Property Qualification or No Property Qualification: A Few Facts from the Record of Patriotic Services of the Colored Men of New York, During the Wars of 1776 and 1812, with a Compendium of Their Present Business, and Property Statistics. New York: Thomas Hamilton and Wm. H. Leonard. 1860. OCLC 191228058.
- Farewell to the Liberator. Boston: s.n. 1863. OCLC 46897189.
- To the Friends of Human Liberty:: We the Undersigned Citizens of Massachusetts Thankful for the Abolition of American Slavery, View with Horror the Fact That Five Hundred Thousand of Our Brethern Groan Beneath the Chains of Slavery at Our Very Doors, in the Island of Cuba. ... It Is Therefore Resolved, That We Hold a Public Meeting, at the Menonian, on Monday Evening, December 23d. [1867], to Take the Necessary and Proper Action to Advance the Cause of Universal Freedom. Boston: s.n. 1867. OCLC 191233682.
- Colored Americans in the Wars of 1776 and 1812. Philadelphia: H.T. Kealing. 1902. OCLC 46897189.
