= History of African Americans in Boston =

Racial history

African Americans in Boston
Total population
- 166,796 (2020)

Languages
- Boston English, African American English, African languages, Haitian Creole

Religion
- Christianity, Traditional African religion, Haitian Voodoo

Despite being one of the most important stops on the Underground Railroad, until 1950, African Americans were a small but historically important minority in Boston, where the population was majority white. Since then, Boston's demographics have changed due to factors such as immigration, white flight, and gentrification. According to census information for 2010–2014, an estimated 180,657 people in Boston (28.2% of Boston's population) are Black/African American, either alone or in combination with another race. Despite being in the minority, and despite having faced housing, educational, and other discrimination, African Americans in Boston have made significant contributions in the arts, politics, and business since colonial times.

Boston has a large foreign-born black population. Many are of Haitian, Cape Verdean, Jamaican, Trinidadian, Ethiopian, Barbadian, and Somali origin.

== History ==
=== Early America ===
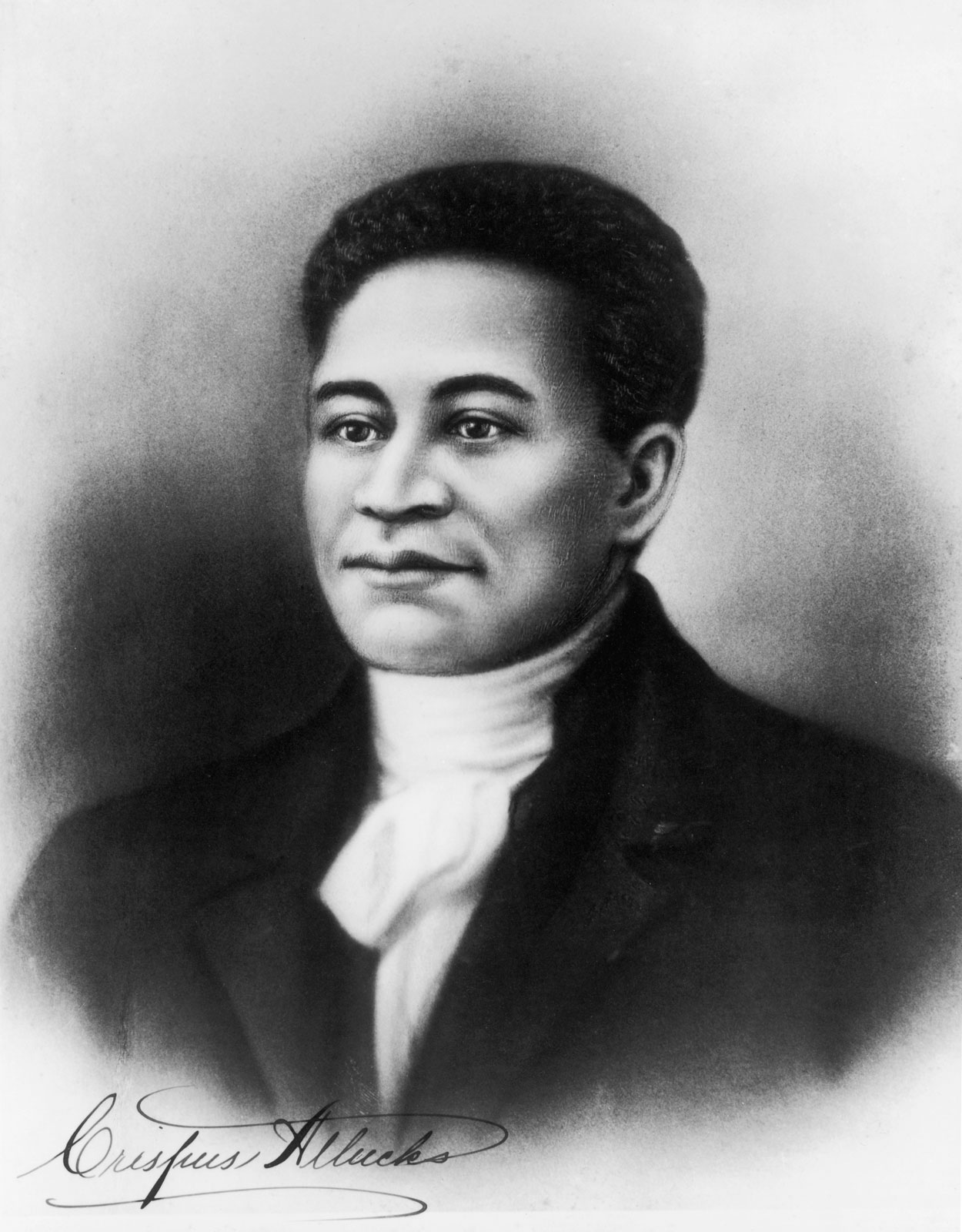
Crispus Attucks

In 1638, a number of African Americans arrived in Boston as slaves on the ship Desiré from New Providence Island in the Bahamas. They were the first black people in Boston on record; others may have arrived earlier.

The first black landowner in Boston was a man named Bostian Ken, who purchased a house and four acres in Dorchester in 1656. (Dorchester was annexed to Boston in 1870). A former slave, Ken bought his own freedom, but was not necessarily a freeman with the right to vote. For humanitarian reasons he mortgaged his house and land to free another slave, making him technically the first African American to "purchase" a slave. Zipporah Potter Atkins bought land in 1670, on the edge of what is now the North End.

A small community of free African Americans lived at the base of Copp's Hill from the 17th to the 19th century. Members of this community were buried in the Copp's Hill Burying Ground, where a few remaining headstones can still be seen today. The community was served by the First Baptist Church. In 1720, an estimated 2,000 African Americans lived in Boston.

In 1767, the 15-year-old Phillis Wheatley published her first poem, "On Messrs. Hussey and Coffin", in the Newport Mercury. It was the first poem published in the Colonies by an African American. Wheatley was a slave from Senegal who lived in the home of Susanna Wheatley on King Street. Wheatley is featured, along with Abigail Adams and Lucy Stone, in the Boston Women's Memorial, a 2003 sculpture on Commonwealth Avenue.

The first casualty of the American Revolutionary War was a man of African and Wampanoag descent, Crispus Attucks, who was killed in the Boston Massacre in 1770. Historians disagree on whether Attucks was a free man or an escaped slave. Slavery was abolished in Massachusetts in 1781, mostly out of gratitude for black participation in the Revolutionary War. Subsequently, a sizable community of free blacks and escaped slaves developed in Boston.

Black Bostonians who fought in the Revolutionary War include Primus Hall, Barzillai Lew, and George Middleton, among others. The Bunker Hill Monument in Charlestown marks the site of the Battle of Bunker Hill, in which a number of African Americans fought, including Peter Salem, Salem Poor, and Seymour Burr.

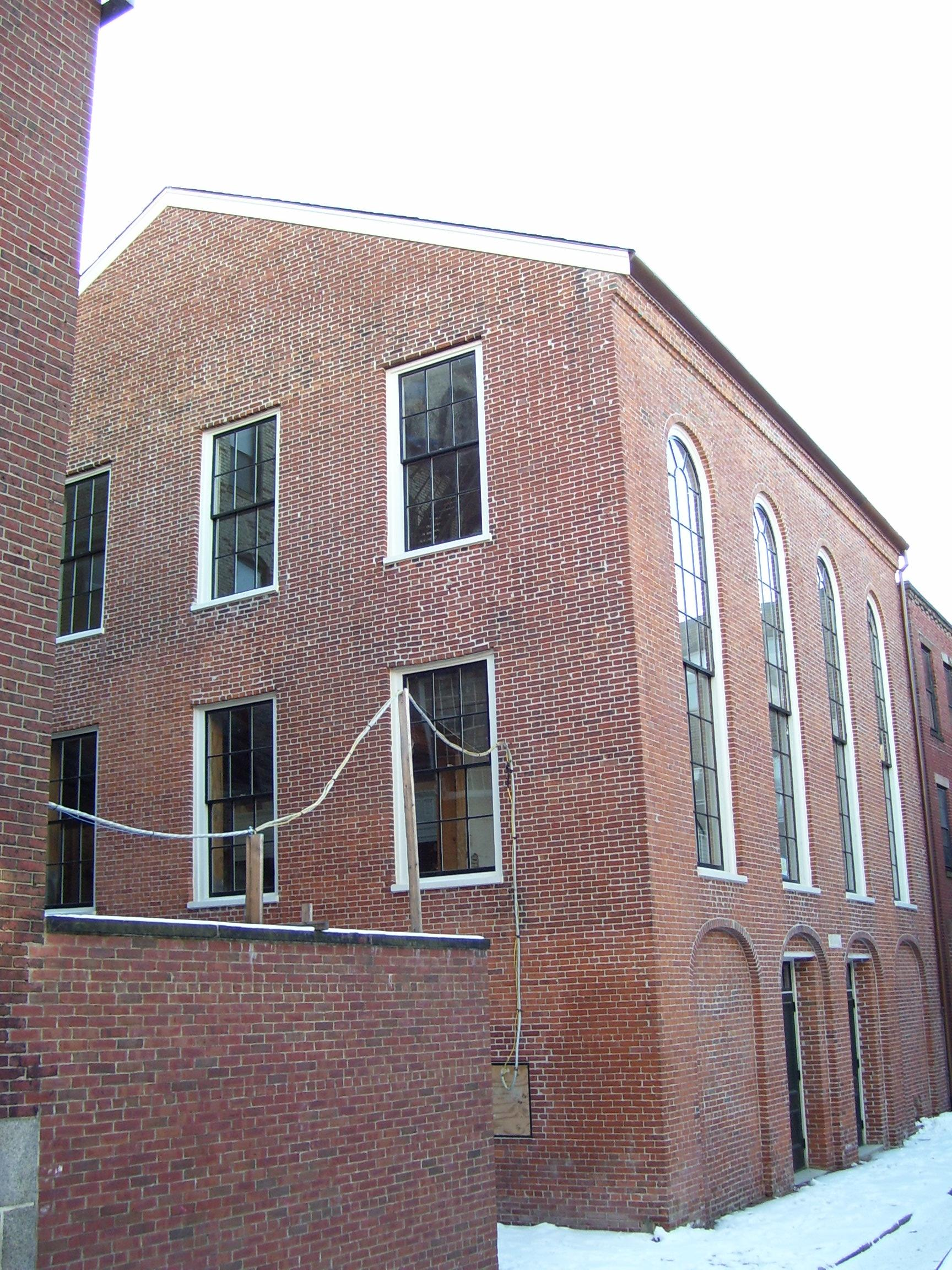
African Meeting House

=== Abolitionism ===
Boston was a hotbed of the abolitionist movement. In the 19th century, many African-American abolitionists lived in the West End and on the north slope of Beacon Hill, including John P. Coburn, Lewis Hayden, David Walker, and Eliza Ann Gardner (see Notable African Americans from Boston). Boston was home to several abolitionist organizations such as the Massachusetts Anti-Slavery Society, whose lecturers included Frederick Douglass and William Wells Brown, and the Boston Female Anti-Slavery Society, whose members included the noted author Susan Paul. Abolitionists held meetings in the African Meeting House on Beacon Hill. The Twelfth Baptist Church, led by abolitionist Rev. Leonard Grimes, was also known as "The Fugitive Slave Church."

Several slave rescue riots took place in Boston. In 1836, Eliza Small and Polly Ann Bates, two escaped slaves from Baltimore, were arrested in Boston and brought before Chief Justice Lemuel Shaw. The judge ordered them freed because of a problem with the arrest warrant. When the agent for the slaveholder requested a new warrant, a group of spectators rioted in the courtroom and rescued Small and Bates. (Note: Different historians describe the rioters differently. According to Jim Vrabel (2004), it was a group of "African-American and white women". In "The 'Abolition Riot': Boston's First Slave Rescue" (1952), Leonard Levy describes them as "Men and women, both white and colored". Other sources refer to a group of "black women". According to Jack Tager, most slave rescue riots were initiated by African Americans prior to 1850, and by white abolitionists after 1850.) Controversy over the fate of George Latimer led to the passage of the 1843 Liberty Act, which prohibited the arrest of fugitive slaves in Massachusetts. Abolitionists rose to the defense of Ellen and William Craft in 1850, Shadrach Minkins in 1851, and Anthony Burns in 1854. An attempt to rescue Thomas Sims in 1852 was unsuccessful.

Several white Bostonians, such as William Lloyd Garrison (founder of the Liberator and a member of the Boston Vigilance Committee), were active in the abolitionist movement. Charles Sumner, the Massachusetts senator who in 1856 was nearly beaten to death on the Senate floor by a Southerner for condemning slavery, was from Boston.

The 54th Massachusetts Infantry Regiment was one of the first official African-American units in the United States during the Civil War. Frederick Douglass and other abolitionists recruited soldiers for the 54th regiment at the African Meeting House. One member of the regiment was Sergeant William H. Carney, who won the Medal of Honor for his gallantry during the Battle of Fort Wagner. Carney's face is shown on the monument to Robert Gould Shaw and the 54th on the Boston Common. The regiment trained at Camp Meigs in Readville.

Boston's Black Heritage Trail stops at the African Meeting House and other sites on Beacon Hill pertinent to black history before the Civil War. The Boston Women's Heritage Trail also celebrates women from this period such as Rebecca Lee Crumpler, the first African-American woman physician, the poet Phyllis Wheatley, and abolitionist Harriet Tubman, who was a frequent visitor to Boston. Harriet Tubman Park, at Columbus Avenue and Pembroke Street, features a memorial sculpture by Fern Cunningham.

=== Late 19th century ===
After the Civil War, the West End continued to be an important center of African-American culture. It was one of the few locations in the United States at the time where African Americans had a political voice. At least one black resident from the West End sat on Boston's community council during every year between 1876 and 1895.

The Boston Police Department appointed Horatio J. Homer, its first African-American officer, in 1878. Sgt. Homer spent 40 years on the police force. A plaque in his honor hangs at the Area B-2 police precinct in Roxbury.

In 1895, the First National Conference of the Colored Women of America was held in Boston.

=== Early 20th century ===
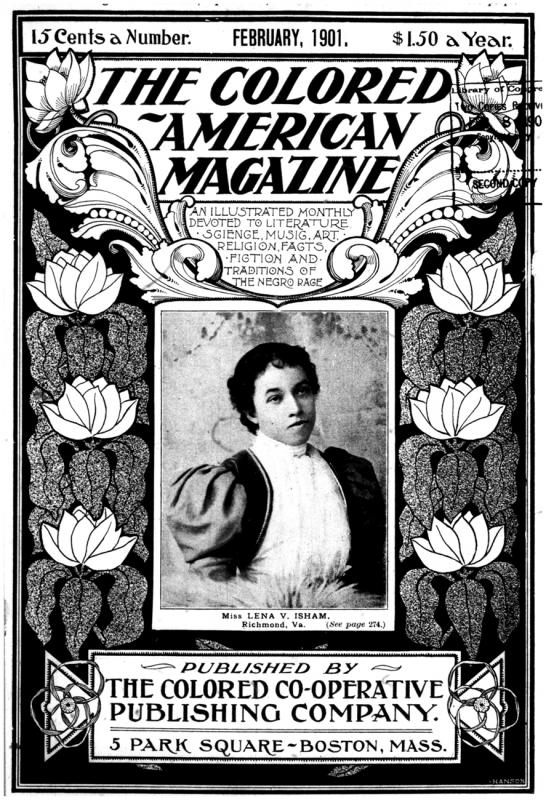
Cover of The Colored American Magazine, February 1901

According to historian Daniel M. Scott III, "Boston played a major role in black cultural expression before, during, and after" the Harlem Renaissance.

Political writers and activists such as William Monroe Trotter, William Henry Lewis, William H. Ferris, Josephine St. Pierre Ruffin, Angelina Weld Grimké, Maria Louise Baldwin, and George Washington Forbes extended Boston's tradition of black activism into the 20th century. Boston by that time had an educated black elite—sometimes referred to as Black Brahmins, after the Boston Brahmins—who laid a social and political foundation for insistence on racial equality. Ruffin, who was a suffragist as well as a civil rights leader, edited the Woman's Era, the first newspaper published by and for African-American women. She also founded the Woman's Era Club, the first club for African American women in Boston.

In theater, Ralf Coleman's Negro Repertory Theater earned him the unofficial title of "Dean of Boston Black Theater". In dance, Stanley E. Brown, Mildred Davenport, and Jimmy Slyde earned national acclaim. In the visual arts, Allan Crite was one of the most influential painters in Boston.

In literature, the Colored American, one of the first magazines aimed at African Americans, was originally published in Boston before moving to New York in 1904; Cambridge-born Pauline Hopkins wrote for the magazine and was its editor from 1902 to 1904. William Stanley Braithwaite's annual Anthology of Magazine Verse, which ran from 1913 to 1929, influenced American taste in poetry.

The Saturday Evening Quill Club was a black literary group organized by Boston Post editor and columnist Eugene Gordon in 1925. Among its members were the writers Pauline Hopkins, Dorothy West, and Florida Ruffin Ridley. The Saturday Evening Quill, the group's annual journal, published the work of African-American women, including the Boston-born poet Helene Johnson and artist Lois Mailou Jones, and attracted the interest of writers in New York. Another noted Boston writer of Johnson's generation was the poet William Waring Cuney, whose 1926 poem "No Images" was later used by jazz artist Nina Simone on her 1966 album Let It All Out.

In 1900, Booker T. Washington founded the National Negro Business League in Boston. Its mission was "to bring the colored people who are engaged in business together for consultation, and to secure information and inspiration from each other". In 1910, David E. Crawford opened the Eureka Co-Operative Bank in Boston; it was referred to as "the only bank in the East owned and operated by 'Colored People'."

The first chartered branch of the National Association for the Advancement of Colored People (NAACP) was founded in Boston in March 1911.

In the first half of the 20th century, Boston's black community diversified considerably due to an influx of immigrants from the West Indies and Cape Verde as well as the American South and West (including Malcolm X). In the 1920s the community began expanding from the South End into Roxbury. Social workers Otto P. Snowden and Muriel S. Snowden founded Freedom House in Roxbury in 1949.

=== Civil rights ===
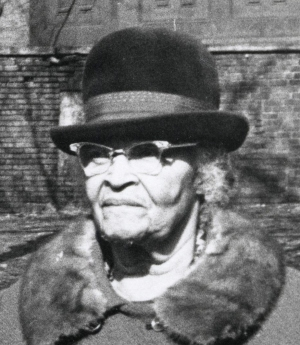
Melnea Cass

"Although popular and scholarly attention has been paid to the struggle for equality in other parts of the country during the twentieth century, Boston's civil rights history has largely been ignored", according to organizers of a symposium at the Kennedy Library in 2006. Although Boston's civil rights movement is usually associated with the busing controversy of the 1970s and 1980s, Bostonians such as Melnea Cass and James Breeden were active in the civil rights movement before then. In 1963, 8,000 people marched through Roxbury to protest "systemic segregation" in Boston's public schools. In April 1965, Martin Luther King Jr. led a march from Roxbury to Boston Common to protest school segregation. That June, after the 114 day Freedom Vigil of Rev. Vernon Carter of All Saints Lutheran Church in the South End, which began two weeks after Martin Luther king's Boston march, the Massachusetts legislature passed the Racial Imbalance Act signed by Governor Volpe, which ordered the state's public schools to desegregate.

On April 5, 1968, hoping to ease racial tensions following King's assassination, Mayor Kevin White asked James Brown not to cancel a scheduled concert at Boston Garden. He persuaded WGBH-TV to televise the concert so that people would stay home to watch it. The next day, nearly 5,000 people attended a rally organized by the Black United Front in White Stadium. Protesters presented a list of demands that included "the transfer of the ownership of ... [white-owned] businesses to the black community, ... every school in the black community shall have all-black staff ... [and] control of all public, private, and municipal agencies that affect the lives of the people in this community."

After Robert F. Kennedy was assassinated, Mel King, then the executive director of the New Urban League, wrote:

We may voice our outrage at certain kinds of violence. We may implement some type of gun-control legislation, but until we confront ourselves, examine and readjust our priorities, make a firm commitment to change, and act on that commitment, we are deceiving ourselves and perpetuating a system which will lead to the ultimate form of violence—the destruction of society.

That September, 500 African-American students walked out of school after a student was sent home from English High School for wearing a dashiki. Later that year, Mel King and the New Urban League protested at a United Way luncheon, charging that Boston's African-American community was receiving only "crumbs".

=== Busing ===
The desegregation of Boston public schools (1974–1988) was a period in which the Boston Public Schools were under court control to desegregate through a system of busing students. The call for desegregation and the first years of its implementation led to a series of racial protests and riots that brought national attention, particularly from 1974 to 1976. In response to the Massachusetts legislature's enactment of the 1965 Racial Imbalance Act, which ordered the state's public schools to desegregate, W. Arthur Garrity Jr. of the United States District Court for the District of Massachusetts laid out a plan for compulsory busing of students between predominantly white and black areas of the city. The court control of the desegregation plan lasted for over a decade. It influenced Boston politics and contributed to demographic shifts of Boston's school-age population, leading to a decline of public-school enrollment and white flight to the suburbs. Full control of the desegregation plan was transferred to the Boston School Committee in 1988; in 2013 the busing system was replaced by one with dramatically reduced busing.

=== Late 20th century ===
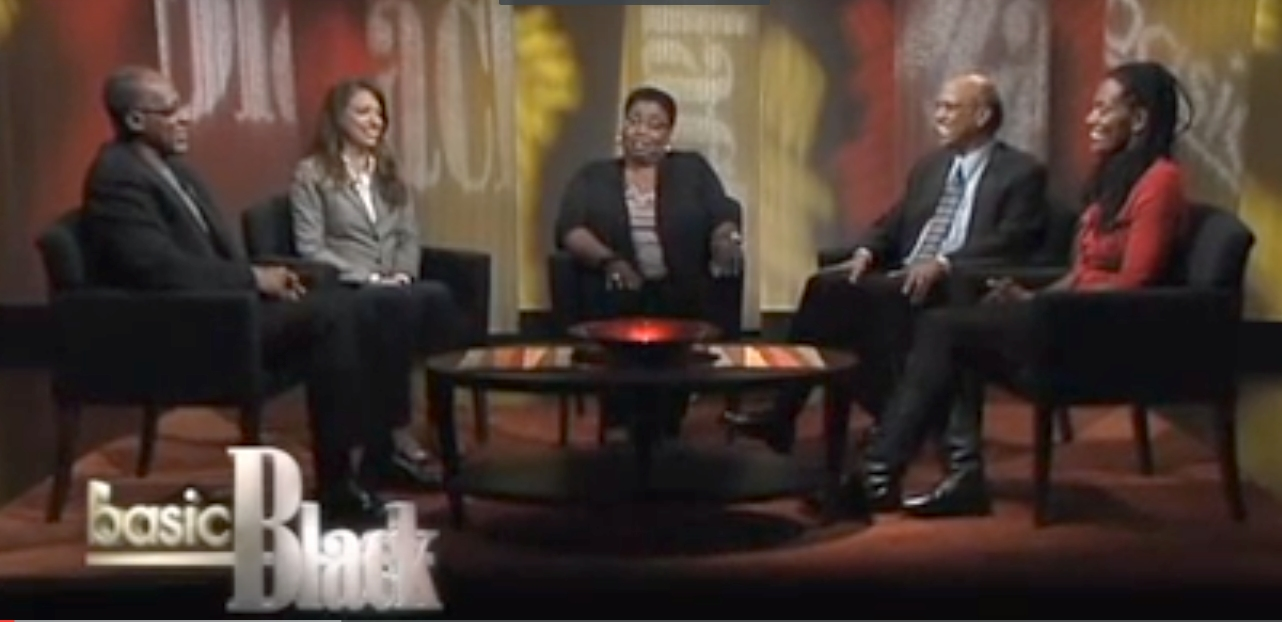
Panelists on Basic Black in 2012, discussing the presidential election (Kenneth Cooper, Cindy Rodriguez, Callie Crossley, Philip Martin, and Kim McLarin)

The National Center of Afro-American Artists (NCAAA) was founded by Elma Lewis in 1968 in Roxbury, Boston.

In 1968, WGBH-TV began airing Say Brother (later renamed Basic Black), Boston's longest running public affairs program produced by, for and about African Americans. In 1972, Sheridan Broadcasting purchased the WILD (AM) radio station, making it the only urban, contemporary music radio station in the country owned and operated by a black-owned company.

Rabbi Gerald Zelermyer of Mattapan was attacked on June 27, 1969, by two black youths who came to his door, handed him a note telling him to "lead the Jewish racists out of Mattapan" and threw acid in his face. He was severely burned but not permanently disfigured. Two Mattapan synagogues were burned down by arsonists in 1970. By 1980, nearly all of the Jews who had lived on Blue Hill Avenue had relocated.

The Elma Lewis School of Fine Arts gave its first annual performance of the Black Nativity at the school in 1970. It has been performed at various venues since then, including the Boston Opera House. Its new home is the Paramount Theatre.

In 1972, the Museum of African American History purchased the African Meeting House, in Boston's Beacon Hill.

From 1974 to 1980, the Combahee River Collective, a political organizing group largely composed of Black lesbian socialists, met in Boston and nearby suburbs. The Collective is perhaps best remembered for developing the Combahee River Collective Statement, a foundational text for identity politics and an important Black feminist text.

In 1978, the Boston branch of the NAACP successfully sued the United States Department of Housing and Urban Development for allowing the Boston Housing Authority to discriminate based on race. Housing discrimination in Boston remained an issue; in 1989 the Federal Reserve Bank of Boston reported that residents of Boston's black neighborhoods were less likely to receive home mortgages than residents of white neighborhoods, "even after taking into account economic and nonracial characteristics that could be responsible for differences between these neighborhoods".

As a gesture of protest over inadequate city services, a group of activists obtained enough signatures to put a non-binding referendum on the November 1986 ballot, proposing that the predominantly black neighborhoods of Boston secede and create a new city called Mandela. Voters in those neighborhoods rejected the proposal by a 3-to-1 margin.

In 1989, Charles Stuart murdered his pregnant wife to collect life insurance and told Boston police she had been killed by a black gunman. The case exacerbated racial tensions in Boston for a time.

Nelson Mandela and his wife Winnie Madikizela-Mandela visited Boston on June 23, 1990.

George Walker's Lilacs, for Voice and Orchestra was premiered by the Boston Symphony Orchestra in 1996 with Seiji Ozawa conducting. The piece earned Walker a Pulitzer Prize for Music, making him the first African-American composer to be awarded the prize.

Many black Boston natives have moved to the suburbs or to Southern cities such as Atlanta, Birmingham, Dallas, Houston, Memphis, San Antonio and Jacksonville.

=== 21st century ===
In 2009, Ayanna Pressley became the first Black woman, and first woman of color, elected to the Boston City Council, in its 140-year history. She won a city-wide At-Large seat. In 2018, she was elected to the House of Representatives, and became the first woman of color to represent Massachusetts in Congress. In 2021, Kim Janey became the first African-American mayor of Boston, having succeeded Marty Walsh following his confirmation as the United States Secretary of Labor.

== Popular culture ==
When founder Joseph L. Walcott opened Wally's Paradise in Boston's South End neighbourhood in 1947, he was the first African American nightclub owner in New England. It is recognized as one of Boston's oldest and longest-operating jazz clubs."

The Embrace is a massive bronze sculpture by Hank Willis Thomas installed on Boston Common in December 2022. It celebrates Boston's civil rights legacy and commemorates the period that Dr. Martin Luther King Jr. lived in Boston. King did his doctoral studies in systematic theology at Boston University in the 1950s and met his wife, Coretta Scott King, who was attending the New England Conservatory of Music, while living in the city. The sculpture is situated within a circular plaza, the 1965 Freedom Plaza, which honors 69 civil rights and social justice leaders active in Boston from the 1950s through the 1970s.

- Donna Summer
- Blue Hill Avenue, 2001 film
- New Edition

== Demographics ==
According to census information for 2010–2014, an estimated 180,657 people in Boston (28.2% of Boston's population) are Black/African American, either alone or in combination with another race. 160,342 (25.1% of Boston's population) are Black/African American alone. 14,763 (2.3% of Boston's population) are White and Black/African American. 943 (.1% of Boston's population) are Black/African American and American Indian/Alaska Native.

| | Number | % of Boston population |
|---|---|---|
| Black/African American | 180,657 | 28.2% |
| Black/African American alone | 160,342 | 25.1% |
| Black/African American and White | 14,763 | 2.3% |
| Black/African American and American Indian/Alaska Native | 943 | .1% |

According to the same report, an estimated 145,112 people in Boston are Black/African American and not Hispanic.

== Notable African Americans ==
1600-1900
- Macon Bolling Allen (1816–1894), the first African American licensed to practice law and to hold a judicial position in the United States
- Zipporah Potter Atkins (mid-1600s), the first African American to own land in the city of Boston
- Crispus Attucks (c.1723–1770), the first casualty of the American Revolutionary War; killed in the Boston Massacre in 1770
- Leonard Black (March 8, 1820 - April 28, 1883), minister, slave memoirist
- William Wells Brown (1814–1884), escaped slave, abolitionist, playwright, historian; author of Clotel (1853), considered the first novel written by an African American
- Anthony Burns (1834–1862), fugitive slave who fled to Boston
- John Coburn (1811–1873), abolitionist, soldier, recruiter, and Underground Railroad conductor
- Ellen (1826–1891) and William Craft (1824–1900), slave memoirists, abolitionists
- Rebecca Lee Crumpler (1831–1895), the first African-American woman to become a physician
- Thomas (1794–1883) and Lucy Dalton (1790–1865), abolitionists
- Hosea Easton (1798–1837), abolitionist, minister
- Eliza Ann Gardner (1831–1922), abolitionist, religious leader
- Moses Grandy (c. 1786–unknown), abolitionist, slave memoirist
- George Franklin Grant (1846–1910), the first African-American professor at Harvard; also a dentist, and inventor of the wooden golf tee
- Leonard Grimes (1815–1873), abolitionist, minister
- William Gwinn (1755–unknown), one of the first black Americans to participate in the Back-to-Africa movement
- Primus Hall (1756–1842), abolitionist, American Revolutionary War soldier
- Prince Hall (1738–1807), freemason, abolitionist
- Lewis Hayden (1811–1889), abolitionist, lecturer, businessman, and politician
- John T. Hilton (1801–1864), abolitionist and businessman
- Horatio J. Homer (ca. 1848–1923), Boston's first African-American police officer
- Thomas James (1804–1891), abolitionist, minister
- Bostian Ken (1600s), in 1656, the first black landowner in (today's) Boston
- George Latimer (1819–1896), an escaped slave whose case became a major political issue in Massachusetts
- Lewis Howard Latimer (1848–1928), inventor and draftsman
- Barzillai Lew (1743–1822), Revolutionary War soldier
- Walker Lewis (1798–1856), abolitionist
- Mary Eliza Mahoney (1845–1926), the first African American to study and work as a professionally trained nurse
- J. Sella Martin (1832–1876), abolitionist, pastor, educator, and politician
- George Middleton (1735–1815), Revolutionary War veteran and community civil rights activist
- Shadrach Minkins (1814–1875), fugitive slave freed by the Boston Vigilance Committee
- Robert Morris (1823–1882), one of the first African-American attorneys in the United States
- William Cooper Nell (1816–1874), abolitionist, writer, postal clerk; the first African American to hold a federal civilian post
- Susan Paul (1809–1841), abolitionist
- Thomas Paul (1773–1831), minister
- Charles Lenox Remond (1810–1873), abolitionist
- John Stewart Rock (1825–1866), dentist, doctor, lawyer, abolitionist
- George Lewis Ruffin (1834–1886), the first African-American graduate of Harvard Law School, the first African American elected to the Boston City Council, and the first black judge in the United States
- John Brown Russwurm (1799–1851), abolitionist, teacher
- John J. Smith (1820–1906), abolitionist, Underground Railroad conductor, and politician
- Samuel Snowden (1765–1850), minister, abolitionist
- Maria W. Stewart (1803–1880), teacher, journalist, lecturer, abolitionist, and women's rights activist
- Harriet Tubman (1822–1913), abolitionist, lived for a time in Boston's South End; her house is on the Boston Women's Heritage Trail
- David Walker (1796–1830), abolitionist; author of An Appeal to the Coloured Citizens of the World
- Edward G. Walker (1830–1901), abolitionist, lawyer, politician
- Phyllis Wheatley (c. 1753–1784), the first published African-American female poet

Early 20th century
- Agnes Jones Adams (1858–1923), one of the early "club women"
- Maria Louise Baldwin (1856–1922), educator and activist from Cambridge; co-founded several Boston organizations
- William Stanley Braithwaite (1878–1962), writer, poet, publisher, and literary critic
- Stanley E. Brown (1902–1978), nationally acclaimed dance instructor
- Ralf Coleman (1898–1976), actor, producer, director, and founder of the Negro Repertory Theater; known as the "Dean of Boston Black Theater"
- Allan Rohan Crite (1910–2007), visual artist
- Wilhelmina Crosson (1900–1991), pioneering educator; founder of the Aristo Club
- William Waring Cuney (1906–1976), poet
- Mildred Davenport (1900–1990), nationally acclaimed dancer, dance instructor, and founder of two dance schools, the Davenport School of Dance and the Silver Box Studio
- William H. Ferris (1874–1941), author, minister, scholar, and activist
- George Washington Forbes (1864–1927), civil rights activist, journalist, co-founder of the Boston Guardian, and one of the first African-American librarians; served at the West End branch of the Boston Public Library for over 30 years
- Jessie G. Garnett (1897–1976), Boston's first black woman dentist
- Richard Theodore Greener (1844–1922), the first African-American graduate of Harvard College; dean of the Howard University School of Law
- Angelina Weld Grimké (1880–1958), journalist, teacher, playwright and poet of the Harlem Renaissance; one of the first African-American women to have a play publicly performed
- Roland Hayes (1887–1977), lyric tenor and composer
- Pauline Hopkins (1859–1930), author from Cambridge; member of the Saturday Evening Quill Club, a Boston literary group; edited the Colored American, one of the first magazines aimed at African Americans
- Helene Johnson (1906–1995), poet
- Lois Mailou Jones (1905–1998), painter
- Clement G. Morgan (1859–1929), Harvard-educated attorney, activist, and city official; born into slavery
- Florida Ruffin Ridley (1861–1943), civil rights activist, suffragist, teacher, writer, and editor
- Josephine St. Pierre Ruffin (1842–1924), civil rights activist, founder of the Woman's Era Club (the first black women's club in Boston) and editor of the Woman's Era, the first newspaper published by and for black women
- Bessie Stringfield (1911–1993), the first African-American woman motorcyclist to ride solo across the United States; one of the few motorcycle despatch riders for the U.S. military during WWII
- William Monroe Trotter (1872–1934), journalist and civil rights activist who influenced the founding of the National Association for the Advancement of Colored People
- Dorothy West (1907–1998), Harlem Renaissance writer
- Butler R. Wilson (1861–1939), attorney and civil rights activist
- Mary Evans Wilson (1866–1928), civil rights activist

Later
- Ruth Batson (1921–2003), civil rights and education activist
- Bruce Bolling (1945–2012), first black president of the Boston City Council
- Edward Brooke (1919–2015), U.S. senator, first African American elected to Senate in the 20th century
- Bobby Brown (b. 1969), R&B singer, songwriter
- Doris Bunte (b. 1933), in 1972, became the first African-American woman elected to the Massachusetts state legislature; appointed Boston Housing Authority administrator in 1984
- Melnea Cass (1896–1978), community and civil rights activist; see also Melnea Cass Boulevard
- Alan Dawson (1929–1996), jazz drummer
- Harry J. Elam, Sr. (1922–2012), the first black judge appointed to the Boston Municipal Court bench, and the court's first black chief justice
- Louis Farrakhan (b. 1933), Nation of Islam leader, activist
- The G-Clefs, doo-wop group
- Gerald R. Gill (1948–2007), historian, Tufts University professor; twice named Massachusetts College Professor of the Year
- Michael E. Haynes (b. 1927), minister, politician, civil rights activist
- Roy Haynes (b. 1925), jazz drummer and bandleader
- Cousin Stizz, rapper
- Wendell Norman Johnson (1935–2007), Boston University dean, rear admiral
- Kim Janey (b. 1965), politician, first African-American mayor of Boston
- Mel King (b. 1928), politician, community organizer, writer, and MIT professor
- Elma Lewis (1921–2004), arts educator, founder of the National Center of Afro-American Artists
- William Henry Lewis (1868–1949), pioneer in athletics, law, and politics; the first African American to be appointed as an Assistant United States Attorney
- Lucy Miller Mitchell (1899–2002), pioneer in early childhood education
- Shabazz Napier (b. 1991), NBA player
- Wayne Selden (b. 1994) NBA player
- Benzino rapper, producer
- David Sutherland Nelson (1933–1998), first African American federal judge in Massachusetts
- Ed O.G. (b. 1970), hip-hop artist
- Porsha Olayiwola (b. 1988), poet laureate
- Patrice O'Neal (1969–2011), comedian, actor
- Paul Parks (1923–2009), the first African-American Secretary of Education for the state of Massachusetts; also a civil rights activist, and president of the Boston NAACP
- Deval Patrick (born 1956), 71st governor of Massachusetts (was educated in Boston, worked in Boston)
- M. Lee Pelton (b. 1950), president of Emerson College
- Ann Hobson Pilot (b. 1943), former principal harpist of the Boston Symphony Orchestra and the Boston Pops
- Benjamin Arthur Quarles (1904–1996), historian
- David L. Ramsay (1939–1970), Vietnam war hero, recipient of the Distinguished Flying Cross; Captain David L. Ramsay Memorial Park in Roxbury is named after him, and features a memorial sculpture by Valerie Maynard
- Pearl Reaves (1929–2000), R&B singer and guitar player
- Byron Rushing (b. 1942), state representative and Majority Whip
- Bill Russell (b. 1934), Celtics player - not from Boston, but important to Boston; a statue of him was installed at City Hall Plaza in 2013; see also Boston Redevelopment Authority protests and Tent City
- George Russell (1923–2009), composer; MacArthur "genius" grant recipient
- Kenneth Kamal Scott (1940–2015), singer, dancer, and actor
- Big Shug, hip hop artist and actor
- Jimmy Slyde (1927–2008), dancer
- Otto P. Snowden (1914–1995) and Muriel S. Snowden (1916 – 1988), community leaders; co-directors and founders of Freedom House
- Sonny Stitt (1924–1982), jazz saxophonist
- Donna Summer (1948–2012), R&B Star, "Queen of Disco"
- Jimmy Walker (1944–2007), NBA player
- Setti Warren (b. 1970), mayor of Newton, Massachusetts; attended Boston College
- Tony Williams (1945–1997), jazz drummer
- Laval Wilson, the first African-American school superintendent in Boston; appointed in 1985
- William Worthy (1921–2014), journalist
- Malcolm X (1925–1965), Nation of Islam minister and activist, founder of the Organization of Afro-American Unity, spent formative years in Roxbury and also did time at the Charlestown State Prison

=== Alumni ===
Many notable African Americans who grew up elsewhere have come to Boston to pursue higher education and career opportunities. For example, Quincy Jones and Esperanza Spalding studied music at Berklee College of Music. Martin Luther King Jr. earned his PhD in systematic theology at Boston University and Coretta Scott King attended the New England Conservatory of Music. The pioneering psychiatrist Dr. Solomon Carter Fuller studied at Boston University School of Medicine. Harvard University in Cambridge, Massachusetts, has graduated many notable African Americans, including W. E. B. Du Bois and Neil deGrasse Tyson.

== African-American organizations ==
- National Black Women's Society
- Boston NAACP
- Men of All Colors Together (Boston)

== See also ==
- History of slavery in Massachusetts
- Timeline of Boston
- Great Migration (African American)
- Cape Verdean Americans
- Demographics of Boston
- Chinese Americans in Boston
- Vietnamese Americans in Boston
- History of Korean Americans in Boston
- History of Italian Americans in Boston
- History of Irish Americans in Boston
- Cape Verdeans in Boston
