= Boston Korea =

Korean-language newspaper in Boston, Massachusetts, US

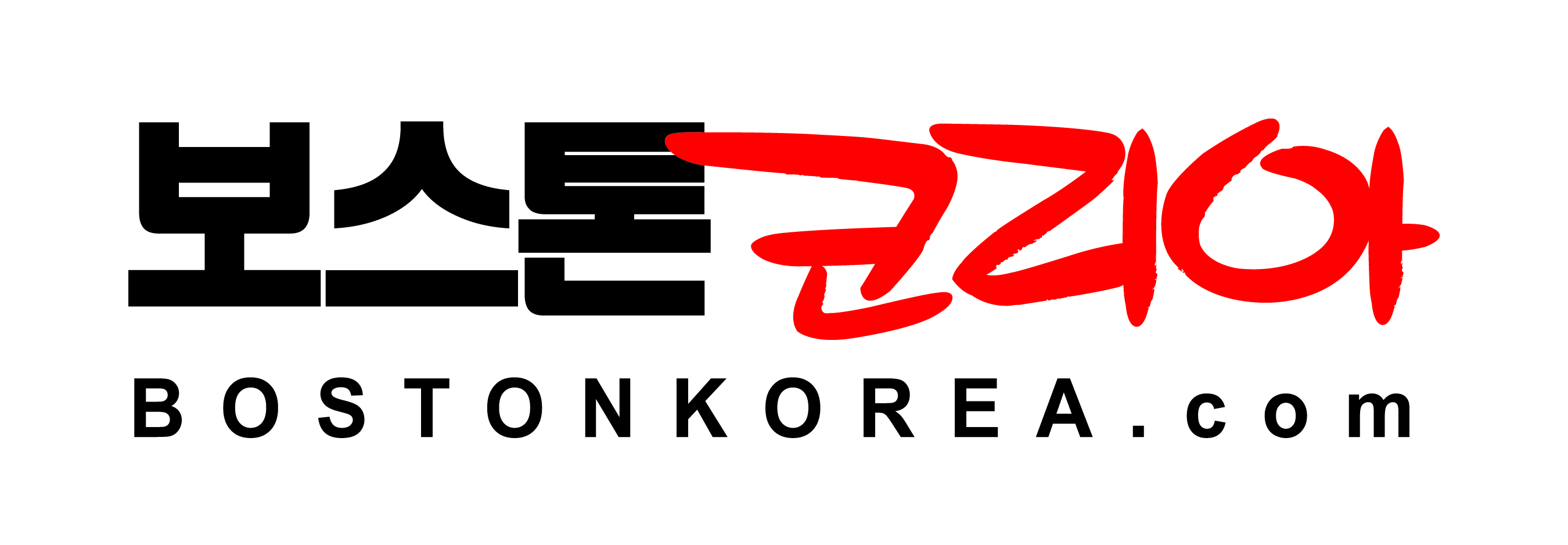
- Native name: 보스톤코리아
- Type: Ethnic community newspaper
- Founder: Myongsool Chang
- Founded: 2005
- Language: Korean
- Headquarters: 161 Harvard Avenue, Allston, Boston, Massachusetts, U.S.
- Country: United States
- Website: bostonkorea.com

Boston Korea (Korean: 보스톤코리아) is a Korean-language newspaper and news website serving the Korean American community of Greater Boston and New England. Founded in 2005 and headquartered in the Allston neighborhood of Boston, it has been described by Boston College's Global Boston project as the region's largest Korean-language newspaper, and by NBC News as the city's last remaining Korean-language newspaper.

== History ==
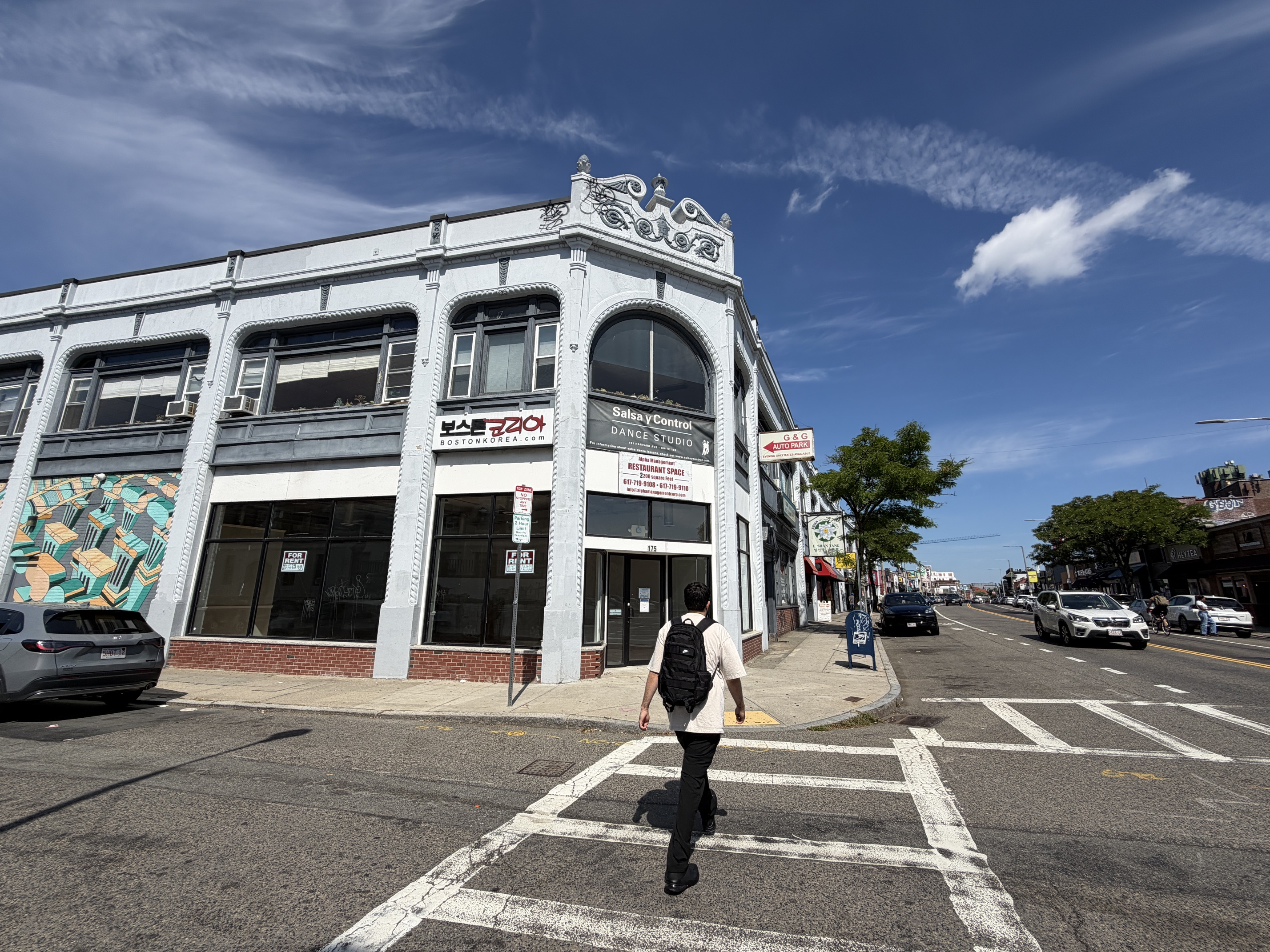
The newspaper's offices on Harvard Avenue in Allston

Boston Korea was founded in 2005 by Myongsool Chang, who had previously worked for six years at a Korean-language news outlet in New England before starting his own publication. In its early years Chang ran the paper largely alone, writing, editing, designing, and personally delivering copies on routes that ran from Allston to New Hampshire. In 2007 the paper merged with Boston Korean, an online classifieds and community forum popular with Korean international students in the area; the following year it moved into a larger office and hired its first full-time reporter.

According to the Encyclopedia of Overseas Korean Culture, published by the Academy of Korean Studies, Boston Korea has been the only Korean-language print newspaper published in the Boston area since its founding. Its print edition, comprising about 32 pages, has been distributed in Massachusetts, New Hampshire, and Rhode Island, with a circulation of about 4,300 copies per issue. The paper later shifted to a monthly print edition supplemented by a weekly digital (PDF) edition delivered by e-mail, alongside its continuously updated news website.

== Coverage ==
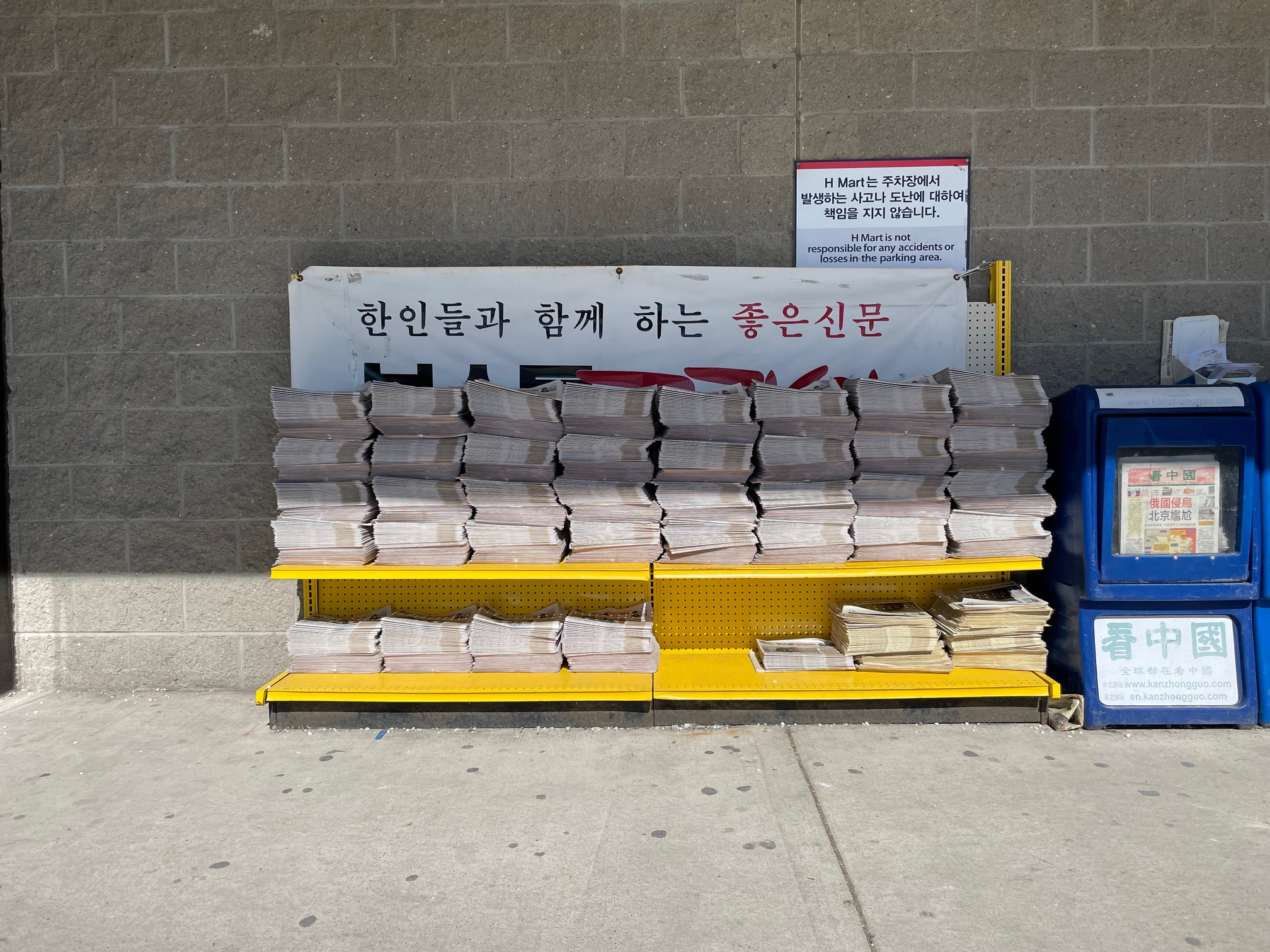
Copies of the paper on a distribution rack at a Korean grocery store chain H Mart in Burlington

The newspaper covers local and community news for Korean residents of New England, including politics, immigration, education, culture, and news from South Korea, as well as practical information such as real estate listings and job postings. It maintains dedicated sections aimed at Korean international students and families in the Boston area, and during the COVID-19 pandemic it carried outbreak updates from South Korea for students far from home. Print copies are distributed through Korean restaurants and stores in Allston and through Korean grocery stores including H Mart, whose Burlington location alone has received about 1,300 copies per issue.

Its offices are located on Harvard Avenue in Allston, a commercial corridor known informally as Boston's Koreatown and a center of Korean American business activity in the city. The newspaper is documented as a community institution by the Boston Korean Diaspora Project, a research initiative of Boston University.

== Awards and recognition ==
In 2021, founder and editor-in-chief Myongsool Chang received a Presidential Commendation from the South Korean government for services to the overseas Korean community, announced on the 15th World Korean Day. In 2024, Boston Korea was among the local news organizations selected in the first national open call of Press Forward, a philanthropic initiative supporting local news, chosen for its work closing coverage gaps for underserved communities.

== See also ==
- History of Koreans in Boston
- Ballymun Concrete News
