= Gail Snowden =

Banking executive and community organizer

- Parent(s): Otto P. Snowden and Muriel Snowden

Gail Snowden is a banking executive and community organizer.

Snowden grew up in the Grove Hall neighborhood of Boston. Her parents were Otto and Muriel Snowden. Snowden earned a bachelor's degree from Radcliffe College, Harvard University. She also earned a master's degree in business administration from Simmons University.

Gail Snowden began her career as a banker at the Bank of Boston in 1968. Snowden was executive vice president of Bank of America. Snowden was operations vice president of the Boston Foundation. She has been a board director and former CEO of Freedom House.

Gail Snowden was recognized with the 1998 Presidential Ron Brown Award. She was also a recipient of the Abigail Adams award in 2001, and honorary doctorates from Simmons University, Bridgewater State University, Babson College and Emmanuel College.

In 2023, she was recognized as one of "Boston’s most admired, beloved, and successful Black Women leaders" by the Black Women Lead project.
