= Me and My Chauffeur Blues =

Single by Memphis Minnie
- B-side: "Can't Afford to Lose My Man"
- Released: 1941
- Recorded: May 21, 1941
- Genre: Blues
- Label: Okeh
- Songwriter: Lawlar (credited on original record)
- Producer: Lester Melrose

"Me and My Chauffeur Blues" is a song written and recorded by blues singer and guitarist Memphis Minnie in 1941. It was added to the U.S. National Recording Registry in 2019. A number of other musicians have recorded the song, or adaptations of it, often under shortened titles.

== Memphis Minnie's song ==
Memphis Minnie recorded "Me and My Chauffeur Blues" in Chicago on May 21, 1941, for Okeh Records, with her husband Ernest "Little Son Joe" Lawlars on additional guitar. She used the tune of "Good Morning, School Girl", recorded by John Lee "Sonny Boy" Williamson in 1937. The 78 rpm record listed "Lawlar" as the songwriter, but it is thought Minnie wrote the song herself. Performing rights organizations show both Minnie and Ernest Lawler [sic] as the writers. The song was selected by the Library of Congress in 2019 for preservation in the National Recording Registry for being "culturally, historically, or aesthetically significant".

== Adaptations by other musicians ==
Big Mama Thornton recorded a version of the song as "Me and My Chauffeur" backed by guitarist Johnny Talbot and his band in Berkeley, California, in March 1964 for producer James C. Moore. It was released that year as a single with "Before Day", the only record ever issued on Moore's Sharp label. Moore leased the two tracks to the Bihari brothers, who issued them on a Kent Records single in 1965. Thornton also recorded it with backing by Mississippi Fred McDowell on slide guitar in the recording session for the Big Mama Thornton – In Europe album in London on October 20, 1965. The track was omitted from the original album, but added as a bonus track titled "Chauffeur Blues" on the 2005 CD reissue.

Nina Simone first heard the piece sung by Thornton. Andy Stroud, Simone's husband and manager, adapted it for her and she recorded it as "Chauffeur" on her Let It All Out album, released in February 1966.

Jefferson Airplane recorded a version as "Chauffeur Blues" on the album Jefferson Airplane Takes Off, released in August 1966, with Signe Anderson as the lead vocalist. The album lists Lester Melrose, the influential early blues record producer, as the songwriter. It is performed at a faster tempo than Minnie's version and uses only three of her four verses. Anderson performed the song with strong contralto vocals. According to Jeff Tamarkin, author of Got a Revolution! The Turbulent Flight of Jefferson Airplane, Jorma Kaukonen brought in "Chauffeur Blues" for Signe to sing. It was not included in the repertoire of Jefferson Airplane's early gigs and was performed only occasionally. It was last performed by the Airplane on October 15, 1966, at the concert recorded as Signe's Last. An extended version of the song is included in the remastered version of Jefferson Airplane Takes Off. The blues writer and historian Thomas Millroth claims Memphis Minnie received no royalties from Jefferson Airplane.

Versions of the song have been recorded by a number of other artists.
