= Let It All Out =

Studio album by Nina Simone
- Released: February 1966
- Recorded: March 1964 – October 1965
- Length: 37:03
- Label: Philips
- Producer: Hal Mooney

Nina Simone chronology
Pastel Blues (1965)	Let It All Out (1966)	Wild Is the Wind (1966)

Professional ratings
Review scores
Source	Rating
AllMusic	3/5 stars
Pitchfork Media	8.5/10
Record Mirror	3/5 stars
Tom Hull	B+

Let It All Out is an album by Nina Simone, released by Philips Records in February 1966.

The song "Chauffeur" is an adaptation of Memphis Minnie's "Me and My Chauffeur Blues" (1941), which Simone first heard Big Mama Thornton sing. Thornton released her version as "Me and My Chauffeur" on the B-side of her "Before Day" single on James Moore's Sharp label in 1964. Simone's version is credited to Andy Stroud, her husband and manager at the time, who adapted it and "Nearer Blessed Lord" for her.

"Images", sung a cappella by Simone, is based on a poem by Waring Cuney.

== Track listing ==
No.	Title	Writer(s)	Length
1.	"Mood Indigo"	Irving Mills, Barney Bigard, Duke Ellington
2.	"The Other Woman"	Jessie Mae Robinson
3.	"Love Me or Leave Me"	Walter Donaldson, Gus Kahn
4.	"Don't Explain"	Billie Holiday, Arthur Herzog, Jr.
5.	"Little Girl Blue"	Richard Rodgers, Lorenz Hart
6.	"Chauffeur"	Andy Stroud
7.	"For Myself"	Van McCoy
8.	"The Ballad of Hollis Brown"	Bob Dylan
9.	"This Year's Kisses"	Irving Berlin
10.	"Images"	Nina Simone, Waring Cuney
11.	"Nearer Blessed Lord"	Stroud
Total length:			37:03

Source: AllMusic

== Personnel ==
- Nina Simone – piano, vocals, arranger
- Rudy Stevenson – guitar, flute
- Lisle Atkinson – bass
- Bobby Hamilton – drums
- Horace Ott – arranger, conductor

== Charts ==
Chart (1966)	Peak position
Hot R&B LPs	19
