= I Ain't No Bad Gal =

Compilation album by Memphis Minnie
- Released: 1988
- Recorded: May & December, 1941, Chicago
- Genre: Blues
- Producer: Bob Thiele

I Ain't No Bad Gal is a compilation album by blues singer Memphis Minnie produced for reissue in 1988 by Bob Thiele.

== Track listings ==
All tracks composed by Ernest Lawlars

1. "You Need a Friend"
2. "Can't Afford to Loose My Man"
3. "Me And My Chauffeur Blues"
4. "Don't Turn the Card"
5. "It Was You, Baby"
6. "Looking the World Over"
7. "I Am Sailin'"
8. "Remember Me Blues"
9. "Down By the Riverside"
10. "I Got to Make a Change Blues"
11. "I'm Not a Bad Gal"
12. "You Got to Get Out of Here"
