= Elva Lee C. Abdal-Khallaq =

American teacher, business owner, and community activist

- Born: c. 1914; Baldwin, Louisiana
- Died: November 18, 2010

Elva Lee Abdal-Khallaq (née Collins; c. 1914-2010) was a teacher, business owner, and community activist based in Boston.

== Early life and education ==
Abdal-Khallaq was born in Baldwin, Louisiana. She was raised in Houston, Texas, and went to high school there. Abdal-Khallaq married her husband, Malik, and moved to Boston, Massachusetts.

== Career ==
In Boston, Abdal-Khallaq co-founded A Nubian Notion with her husband. situated in the Dudley Square area of Roxbury, it was a prominent Afro-centric store in Boston for many years. In the 1990s, the store opened another location in Ruggles station. Both locations have since closed.

In addition, Abdal-Khallaq taught at several community schools. and was the recording secretary for the Goldenaires group, based at Freedom House in Roxbury, from 1989 to 1993.

== Honors and awards ==
In 2023, Abdal-Khallaq was recognized as one of "Boston’s most admired, beloved, and successful Black Women leaders" by the Black Women Lead project.
