= Jeong Gyeong-mo =

South Korean writer and reunification activist (1924–2021)

- 정경모
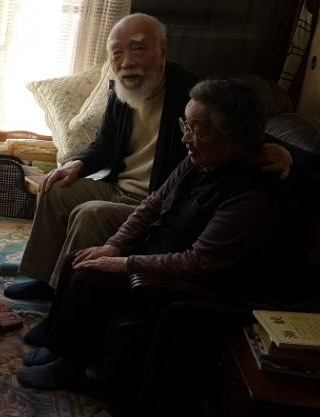
- Jeong (left) and his wife, Nakamura Chiyoko, at home on 1 March 2018
- Born: 11 July 1924; Seoul, Korea, Empire of Japan
- Died: 16 February 2021 (aged 96); Yokohama, Japan
- Education: Emory University
- Occupations: Writer, political commentator, translator, reunification activist
- Known for: Pro-democracy and Korean reunification activism in Japan
- Notable work: The Torn Land; The Night Watch of History

Jeong Gyeong-mo (Korean: 정경모; Hanja: 鄭敬謨; 11 July 1924 – 16 February 2021), also romanised Chung Kyung-mo, was a South Korean writer, translator and political commentator who spent much of his later life in Japan. He was active in campaigns for South Korean democratisation and Korean reunification, and took part in the 1989 Pyongyang visit of the Reverend Moon Ik-hwan. His fictional work The Torn Land (찢겨진 산하) was among the books prohibited under the Chun Doo-hwan government.

== Early life and work ==
Jeong was born in Seoul on 11 July 1924. His father, Jeong In-hwan, was a Christian elder and pottery merchant. Jeong studied at Gyeonggi Middle School and completed a preparatory medical course at Keio University in 1945. After further study in Korea, he went to the United States and graduated from the College of Arts and Sciences at Emory University in 1950.

In his memoir series, Jeong recalled lodging near Keio in Hiyoshi, Yokohama, where he met his future wife, Nakamura Chiyoko, the daughter of the household. They married in July 1951, with Moon Ik-hwan officiating.

Following the outbreak of the Korean War, Jeong worked with the Allied forces and served as an interpreter during the 1951–1953 armistice talks. He left the American military in 1956. Changbi links his departure to his criticism of the United States' role in the war, while OKpedia and the Moon Ik-hwan Archive describe it as a dismissal after he was deemed ideologically suspect. He subsequently worked as a technical adviser to the South Korean government; OKpedia identifies the Ministry of Commerce and Industry and the Ulsan petrochemical complex project among his work during the 1960s. He moved to Japan in 1970.

== Publishing and activism in Japan ==
In Japan, Jeong contributed to newspapers and magazines and campaigned for South Korean democratisation, including activity following the 1973 kidnapping of Kim Dae-jung and calls for the release of the poet Kim Chi-ha.

He opened a private school named The Power of the Seed (씨알의 힘) in Tokyo in 1979. The Academy of Korean Studies records that he published nine issues of a Japanese-language Korean-affairs journal under that name between May 1981 and October 1987. It was renamed The Seed (씨알) in July 1991 and continued until August 2004, with 42 issues published under the later title.

== The Torn Land and censorship ==
Jeong's Unsang Gyeongnyun Mundap (운상경륜문답) presented an imagined conversation among the Korean independence figures Yeo Un-hyeong, Kim Ku and Jang Jun-ha. Through the fictional discussion, the work addressed the circumstances of Korea's liberation, the division of the peninsula and the political conflicts of the early post-liberation period.

The work appeared in the June 1983 issue of The Power of the Seed. The Academy of Korean Studies records that a pirate Korean edition titled The Torn Land (찢겨진 산하) circulated in 1986; Kyunghyang Shinmun also identifies a Korean translation published by Georeum in 1992.

Seoul National University's student newspaper includes the work among publications prohibited under Chun Doo-hwan. It describes the book as exposing aspects of early South Korean political history that the authorities found uncomfortable.

== Reunification activism ==
In 1989, Jeong travelled to Pyongyang with Moon Ik-hwan. He participated in discussions with Ho Dam, chairman of North Korea's Committee for the Peaceful Reunification of the Fatherland, and helped produce the 2 April joint statement associated with the visit. Afterward he remained in Japan rather than submit to the South Korean authorities' requested investigation, and was unable to return to Korea.

A South Korean government investigation announcement published in May 1989 accused Jeong of acting as a North Korean political operative and helping to organise the visit as a North Korean operation. Writing in 2009, Jeong rejected the suggestion that he had manipulated Moon into making the visit. He said that he had refused to sign a self-surrender statement (자수서) because he regarded it as an admission of espionage. The Hankyoreh later reported that he had repeatedly rejected offers of return conditional on signing such a statement.

The Moon Ik-hwan Archive records that Jeong accompanied Moon's widow, Park Yong-gil, on another visit to Pyongyang in 1995. In 2001, he was selected for the sixth Neutbom Unification Award (늦봄통일상).

== Translation, memoir and later years ==
Jeong translated Korean and other works into Japanese. His translations included Bruce Cumings' The Origins of the Korean War and fiction by Hwang Sok-yong. In 2014 he told The Hankyoreh that he had spent twelve years translating Hwang's Jang Gil-san and had completed the manuscript, but that its publication was uncertain after the publisher proposed new funding conditions.

His memoir The Night Watch of History (시대의 불침번), based on his 2009 newspaper recollections, was published in 2010. Reviewing the book in The Hankyoreh, Han Seung-dong presented it as a valuable first-person account connecting episodes of modern Korean history and noted its colloquial style. A Japanese edition (歴史の不寝番) was published by Fujiwara Shoten in May 2011 in a translation by Jeong Gang-heon. In his later years Jeong also worked on a study of ancient Korean–Japanese history.

== Death and burial ==
Jeong died at his home in Yokohama on 16 February 2021. Yonhap reported that he had been suffering from pneumonia and that a possible return to Korea had been discussed shortly before the COVID-19 pandemic prevented it. A memorial service was held in Seoul on 2 April, and his remains were interred at Moran Park in Namyangju. The Moon Ik-hwan Archive records that the site was subsequently arranged as a shared plot alongside Moon Ik-hwan, Yu Won-ho and their wives.

== Selected works ==
- Unsang Gyeongnyun Mundap (운상경륜문답, 1983)
- The Torn Land (찢겨진 산하; Korean pirate edition, 1986; Georeum edition, 1992)
- Questioning the Essence of Japan (일본의 본질을 묻는다, Korean edition, 1989)
- The Night Watch of History (시대의 불침번, 2010)
- Rekishi no Nezunoban (歴史の不寝番, Japanese edition translated by Jeong Gang-heon, 2011)

== See also ==
- Censorship in South Korea
- Korean reunification
