= Mandela, Massachusetts =

- Proposed City
- Interactive map of Mandela, Massachusetts
- Location within the United States
- Coordinates: 42°21′29″N 71°03′49″W
- Country: United States
- State: Massachusetts
- County: Suffolk
- Region: New England

A map of Boston, Massachusetts, USA highlighting in blue the precincts that would have been included in the proposed new city of Mandela, Massachusetts.

Mandela was a proposed city that would have been formed as a result of some districts seceding from Boston, Massachusetts.

The districts, including parts of Roxbury, Dorchester, Mattapan and the South End, were populated mainly by African-Americans and Latinos, and the movement was driven by Black community leaders. The name was inspired by South African anti-Apartheid activist and political prisoner, later President of South Africa Nelson Mandela.

The proposal was defeated in 1986 and again in 1988.

== Background and impetus ==
Activists gathered in the summer of 1984 to discuss remedies to the imbalance of power they perceived between communities within the greater city of Boston, as it had expanded through annexations in the 19th century. Leaders spoke of the relationship between Black residents and City Hall as that of a "colony," in an era when apartheid in the Republic of South Africa, notions of community control were under discussion, and a decade after the upheavals created in Boston by efforts at school desegregation and busing.

== Referendums in 1986 ==
The proposal to create Mandela sought to carve out a new, 12-square-mile city in the heart of Boston, which would comprise about 22 percent of Boston's 600,000 population, including most of its black residents.

The Greater Roxbury Incorporation Project (GRIP) were the sponsors of the Mandela initiative; the co-leaders of the GRIP campaign were journalist and filmmaker Andrew Philemon Jones and architect Curtis Davis. Mel King was also a proponent, and ran in 1983 as mayoral candidate against then city council member, Raymond Flynn.

Other community-based organizations in Boston doing work around local Black and Brown residents' land control included the Dudley Street Neighborhood Initiative (DSNI) and Greater Roxbury Neighborhood Authority (GRNA).

Jones said that Black neighborhoods had "a colonial relationship with the city of Boston" because they were not given adequate public funds. Opponents, including some of Boston's black ministers, Roxbury state representative Thomas Finneran and Mayor Raymond L. Flynn, claimed the new municipality would undermine gains and create a community with annual deficit of $135 million.

A non-binding referendum question about succession appeared on the ballot in 1986, on November 4. Nearly 50,000 people voted in the referendum. The proposal failed, with 73 percent voting against it. The measure did not win in any precinct, and fared worst in the predominantly Black neighborhoods.

== 1988 referendum and beyond ==
The plan was put back on the ballot in 1988, when it was also defeated. In 1989, Jones proposed a longer-range commission that would study the impacts of turning a neighborhood into an independent city.

In 2017, Epicenter Community held a panel discussion about the movement.

== Referendum results ==
State Legislative District	1986 Referendum				1988 Referendum			
State Legislative District	YES	NO	TOTAL	% YES	YES	NO	TOTAL	% YES
Third Suffolk	1,280	3,624	4,904	26.1%				
Fifth Suffolk	1,027	3,322	4,349	23.6%	1,231	2,529	3,760	32.7%
Sixth Suffolk	684	1,962	2,646	25.9%	1,625	3,350	4,975	32.7%
Seventh Suffolk	1,446	3,691	5,137	28.1%	2,158	3,021	5,179	41.7%
Ninth Suffolk	1,348	3,841	5,189	26.0%	2,446	3,540	5,986	40.9%
Twelfth Suffolk	1,460	3,819	5,279	27.7%	2,211	4,027	6,238	35.4%
Thirteenth Suffolk	1,055	3,301	4,356	24.2%	1,971	4,781	6,752	29.2%
Fourteenth Suffolk	1,585	4,371	5,956	26.6%				
Fifteenth Suffolk	1,034	4,076	5,110	20.2%				
Seventeenth Suffolk	1,191	3,266	4,457	26.7%				
TOTAL	12,110	35,273	47,383	25.6%	11,642	21,248	32,890	35.4%

== See also ==
- Timeline of Boston history
- History of African Americans in Boston
- Black nationalism
- Urban secession
