= Wally's Cafe =

Jazz club in Boston, Massachusetts

Coordinates: 42.3407°N 71.0822°W

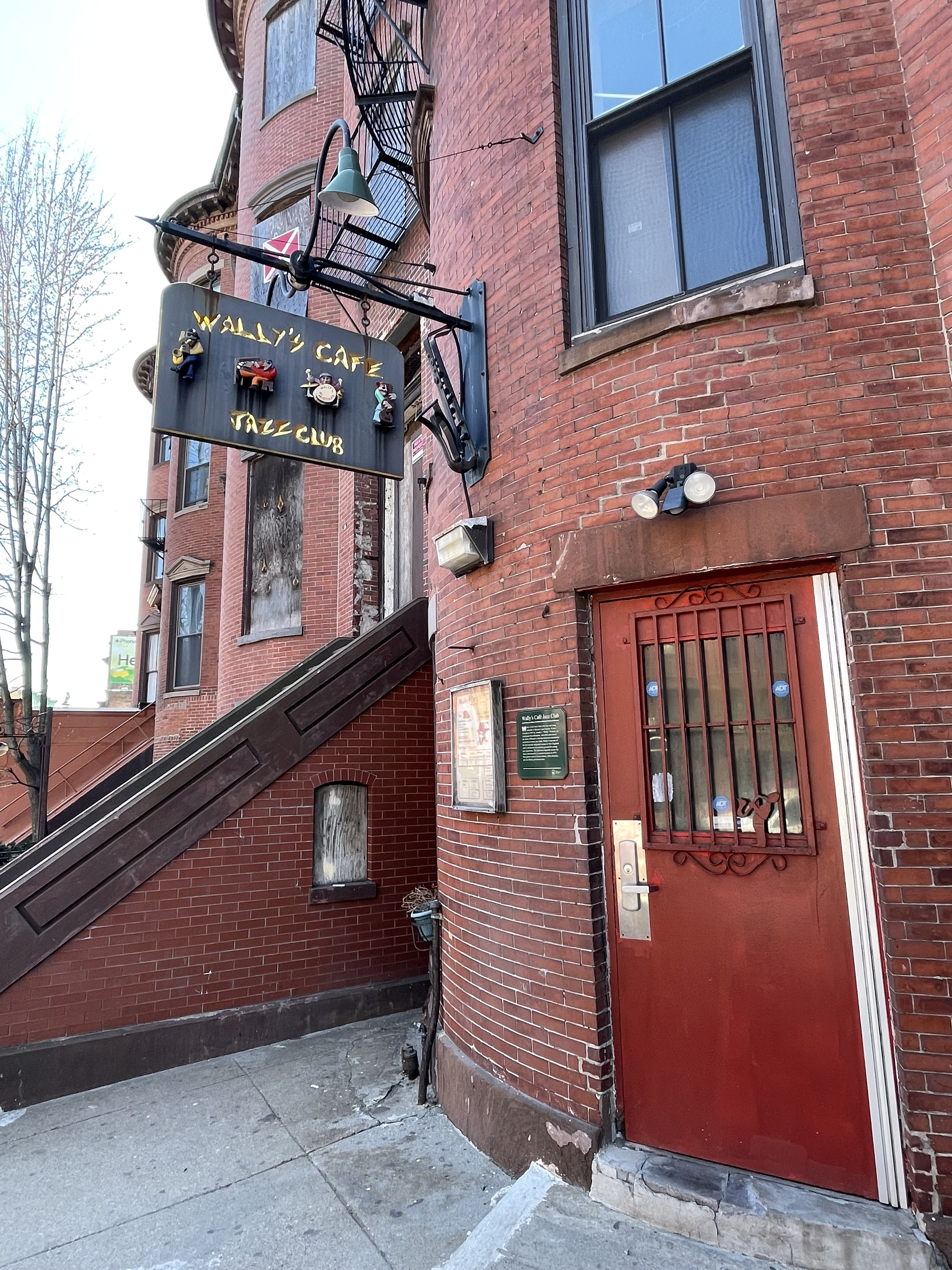
Wally's Cafe, 427 Massachusetts Ave, Boston, MA 02118

Wally’s Cafe, located on 427 Massachusetts Avenue in Boston, Massachusetts, U.S., originally opened across the street on January 1, 1947, by Joseph L. Walcott. Formerly Wally’s Paradise, the institution is recognized as one of Boston’s oldest and longest-operating jazz clubs. Through the 1950s, Wally’s stage offered a home to a reliable core of local jazz musicians, including the likes of Fat Man Robinson, Bunny Campbell, Art Foxall, Herbie and Roland Lee, Joe Perry, Stanley Trotman, Sabby Lewis, and Mabel Robinson. Outliving all the neighboring jazz institutions, Wally’s Cafe was given the ‘historic’ label in 1997 by the City of Boston’s Business Heritage Project for staying in business for over 25 years.

Notable non-musical celebrities Angela Davis and Bill Murray have both been cited dancing at the historic Boston club.

== Joseph L. Walcott ==
Emigrating from his homeland Barbados to the United States of America in 1910, "Wally" worked various jobs to support his family before opening Wally’s Paradise in 1947. During the prohibition, while living at 610 Columbus Avenue, Wally operated a buffet flat as a bootlegger, a common practice for people living in apartments on Columbus Avenue.

Wally’s most notable job was as a taxi driver where he would meet James Curley, Boston’s mayor at the time. Without the help of the mayor, it would have been impossible for Wally to be granted a liquor license. But, seeing an opportunity to win over Black votes in the upcoming election, Curley paved the way for Wally to become the first Black man in all of New England to own both a nightclub and a liquor license.

When asked why he wanted to open the club, Wally gave two reasons. Firstly, he wanted a space for Black patrons to be able to enjoy live music seeing as no other options were available. The second reason was the potential economic security it offered him and his family.

Walcott died in 1998 at the age of 101, and his family continues to manage Wally’s Cafe to this day. Over the course of his life, Wally accumulated a multitude of honors from the likes of the City of Boston, Commonwealth of Massachusetts, and the Berklee College of Music.

== History ==
=== Early Years of Wally's Paradise ===
Between the years of 1947-1978, Wally’s Paradise, as it was then called, operated out of 428 Massachusetts Avenue. When it first opened, the location had three bars, a full kitchen and an accompanying dance floor. During these first few years, Walcott strictly showcased Jazz musicians and promoted the nightclub relentlessly at local universities. The promotion extended past distributing handbills to advertising in The Boston Record, with Walcott even sponsoring his own radio program straight out of the club on WVOM.

In only their first year, Sabby Lewis, whose local band was at the peak of their popularity, was one of the club's regular players. Amongst the musical regulars was saxophonist Jimmy Tyler, who organized popular Sunday jam sessions attended by up and coming artists and veterans alike.

Through the 1950s, a steady core of local musicians showcasing a variety of jazz styles frequented Wally’s Paradise. Wally welcomed known artists Fat Man Robinson, Bunny Campbell, Art Foxall, Herbie and Roland Lee, Joe Perry, Stanley Trotman, Mabel Robinson, and drummer Alan Dawson. Jazz giants Bird, Lou Donaldson, Cannonball Adderley, and Duke Ellington all played at Wally’s at least once, making the venue one of Boston’s premiere jazz arenas.

Wally’s Paradise saw a drastic makeover in the 1960s. In 1960, the club officially changed its name from ‘Wally’s Paradise’ to ‘Wally’s Cafe’. The cafe embraced the era of organ duos and trios, purchasing a 1937 Model A Hammond organ for their musicians to play.

In 1978, through eminent domain, Wally’s original location was taken over by the City of Boston. The reasoning for this was the construction of a new highway, one that was never actually built. Only a year later, Walcott relocated the nightclub to its current location across the street at 428 Massachusetts Avenue. The new space was a long, narrow room that only held a capacity of 99 people.

=== Black Community in the South End ===
When Wally’s Paradise opened in 1947, two jazz clubs already existed in close proximity. These jazz clubs, however, were only open to white patrons. Hi-Hat, a jazz club just across the street, was inspired by Wally’s success to transition the club from white-only to a color-blind admissions policy in 1948.

The scene inside Wally’s Cafe was far different to what was happening outside in the 60s. Boston’s South End was experiencing a significant decline in quality of life, as racial inequalities were best represented by the neighborhood's lack of quality in housing, schools, and public safety. Mass Ave was once the home to three jazz clubs, but now only Wally’s remains.

=== Impact on the Youth ===
Despite attracting some of the biggest stars in the world of jazz, Wally’s Cafe prioritised investing in Jazz's youth. Many notable musicians cited Wally’s as the location for their first ever live performance. Wally maintained his commitment to jazz by featuring young musicians who were attending prominent academic institutions such as Berklee College of Music, the Boston Conservatory, and the New England Conservatory of Music. Walcott hired these young music students and mixed them with seasoned professionals who were veterans of the Big Band era in the 1960s. Jam sessions provided an opportunity for lesser known artists to integrate with more experienced ones.

When Wally’s Paradise turned into Wally's Cafe in 1960, the institution took its investment in the youth one step further. Walcott recognized the location as a hub for young musicians, and set out to help these students reach their musical goals by providing them with opportunities in any way he could. The club began employing young musicians attending nearby schools and offering cheap housing options in the form of apartments above the nightclub.

=== Renovations and Post COVID-19 ===
In the mid-1990s, Wally’s suffered from overcrowding issues, flirting with occupancy limit on an almost nightly basis. Patrons often complained about the cramped space, smoke, and body odor that filled the room. The city took notice of these issues and recommended the club expand. Talks of the expansion dragged on for many years, the primary reason for this being an issue involving estate disputes between Walcott's grandchildren.

In 2023, Wally's grandchildren – the third generation of Walcotts – now run and manage the club. Wally’s Cafe was forced to close for two and a half years following the COVID19 pandemic, and only barely survived foreclosure having lost almost 90% of its revenue.
