= Karen Miller (firefighter) =

Boston's first African-American female firefighter

- Education: Snowden International School
- Occupation: Firefighter

Karen Miller was Boston’s first African-American female firefighter. She became a firefighter in 1985.

Miller graduated from Muriel S. Snowden International School (formerly Copley High School) in 1973.

She was also the president of the Boston Society of Vulcans, an organization of black firefighters that promotes diversity in fire service.

Miller was honored by Ayanna Pressley and the Boston City Council in 2010. In 2023, she was recognized as one of "Boston’s most admired, beloved, and successful Black Women leaders" by the Black Women Lead project.
