= Snowden International School =

Snowden International School at Copley

Location
- 150 Newbury Street; Boston, Massachusetts; United States; 42.35057°N 71.07797°W

Information
- Former name: Copley High School
- Type: Public
- School district: Boston Public Schools
- Head of School: Raquel Martinez
- Grades: 9-12
- Enrollment: 439 (2016–2017)
- Colors: Gold and Green
- Athletics conference: Boston City League
- Mascot: Cougar
- Website: snowdeninternational.org

The Muriel Sutherland Snowden International School at Copley (formerly Copley High School) is a public high school located in Boston, Massachusetts, United States. Its international-themed curriculum was introduced by the school's namesake, Muriel S. Snowden, in 1983. The school was renamed after Snowden in 1988.

As a part of the international-themed curriculum, students are required to take four years of a foreign language: (Spanish, French, Chinese, or Japanese). In addition to the language component, Snowden International School has the goal of having twenty five percent of each student class take part in exchange/immersion programs to foreign countries including China, Japan, Canada, England and Costa Rica.

== Special features ==
Snowden offers students an accelerated college preparatory curriculum, the Advanced Placement program, and beginning in 2010, the International Baccalaureate Diploma Programme.

The school also has a college-like campus setting in Boston's historic Copley Square, the Princeton University Mentoring program, and formal connections to both the Freedom House, Inc. and Upward Bound at Boston University.

== Athletics ==
The school mascot for Snowden International School is the cougar. The school colors are green and gold. Snowden competes in boys and girls basketball, girls volleyball, track and field, ice hockey, field hockey, baseball, and softball. Students can participate in football through a cooperative program hosted by South Boston High School.

== Notable alumni ==
- 1973 Karen Miller, First African American female firefighter of the City of Boston
- 1987 Danny Wood, Entertainer, New Kids on the Block
- 1987 Donnie Wahlberg, Entertainer, New Kids on the Block
- 1989 Mark Wahlberg, Entertainer, Marky Mark and The Funky Bunch
