= Memphis Minnie =

American blues guitarist and singer-songwriter (1897–1973)

Background information
- Also known as: Kid Douglas; Minnie Lawlars
- Born: Lizzie Douglas; June 3, 1897; Tunica County, Mississippi, U.S.
- Died: August 6, 1973 (aged 76) Memphis, Tennessee, U.S.
- Genres: Blues; Memphis blues
- Occupations: Musician; songwriter
- Instruments: Guitar; vocals; bass guitar; banjo; drums; whistling
- Years active: 1908–1958
- Labels: Okeh; Columbia; Vocalion; Decca; Bluebird; Checker; JOB
- Spouse: Kansas Joe McCoy (m. 1929; div. 1934)

Lizzie Douglas (June 3, 1897 – August 6, 1973), better known as Memphis Minnie, was a blues guitarist, vocalist, and songwriter whose recording career lasted for over three decades. She recorded around 200 songs, some of the best known being "When the Levee Breaks", "Me and My Chauffeur Blues", "Bumble Bee", and "Nothing in Rambling".

== Childhood ==
Douglas was born on June 3, 1897, probably in Tunica County, Mississippi, although she claimed to have been born in New Orleans, Louisiana, and raised in the Algiers neighborhood. She was the eldest of 13 siblings. Her parents, Abe and Gertrude Douglas, nicknamed her Kid when she was young, and her family called her that throughout her childhood. Reportedly, she disliked the name Lizzie. When she first began performing, she played under the name Kid Douglas.

When she was seven years old, she and her family moved to Walls, Mississippi, south of Memphis, Tennessee. The following year, she received her first guitar as a Christmas present. She learned to play the banjo by the age of 10 and the guitar by 11, when she started playing at parties. The family later moved to Brunswick, Tennessee. After Minnie's mother died, in 1922, Abe Douglas moved back to Walls, where he died in 1935.

== Career ==
In 1910, at the age of 13, she ran away from home to live on Beale Street in Memphis. She played on street corners for most of her teenaged years, occasionally returning to her family's farm when she ran out of money. Her sidewalk performances led to a tour of the South with the Ringling Brothers Circus from 1916 to 1920. Minnie's early musical development reflected the broader Southern country blues, highlighting the tradition with which she had grown up. As David Evan notes in Big Road Blues, performers from the Mississippi Delta and other regions combined a mixture of dance rhythms, melodic phrasing, and storytelling of Black rural culture, all of which are elements that are audible in Minnie's early guitar and vocal work. By adapting and reshaping this style, she became one of the performers who helped define the emerging country blues for later generations. She then went back to Beale Street, with its thriving blues scene, and made her living by playing guitar and singing, supplementing her income with prostitution.

She began performing with Kansas Joe McCoy, her second husband, in 1929. They were discovered by a talent scout for Columbia Records, in front of a barber shop, where they were playing for dimes. She and McCoy went to record in New York City and were given the names Kansas Joe and Memphis Minnie by a Columbia A&R man. Over the next few years, she and McCoy released a series of records, performing as a duet. In February 1930, they recorded the song "Bumble Bee" for the Vocalion label, which they had already recorded for Columbia, but which had not yet been released. It became one of Minnie's most popular songs; she eventually recorded five versions of it. Minnie and McCoy continued to record for Vocalion until August 1934, when they recorded a few sessions for Decca Records. Their last session together was for Decca, in September. They divorced in 1935.

Minnie's public persona during this time also marked a significant challenge to gender norms in blues performance. Julia Simon illustrates that Minnie cultivated an essence of an assertive and authoritative stage identity. She emphasized musical authority and personal autonomy, contradicting the conventional norms of blues women at the time. Her vocal confidence and commanding stage presence established her as a role model influencing generations of female blues artists.

An anecdote from Big Bill Broonzy's autobiography, Big Bill Blues, recounts a cutting contest between Minnie and Broonzy in a Chicago nightclub on June 26, 1933, for the prize of a bottle of whiskey and a bottle of gin. Each singer was to sing two songs; after Broonzy sang "Just a Dream" and "Make My Getaway", Minnie won the prize with "Me and My Chauffeur Blues" and "Looking the World Over". Paul and Beth Garon, in their biography Woman with Guitar: Memphis Minnie's Blues, suggested that Broonzy's account may have combined various contests at different dates, as these songs of Minnie's date from the 1940s rather than the 1930s.

By 1935, Minnie was established in Chicago and had become one of a group of musicians who worked regularly for the record producer and talent scout Lester Melrose. Back on her own after her divorce from McCoy, Minnie began to experiment with different styles and sounds. She recorded four sides for Bluebird Records in July 1935, returned to the Vocalion label in August, and then recorded another session for Bluebird in October, this time accompanied by Casey Bill Weldon, her first husband. By the end of the 1930s, in addition to her output for Vocalion, she had recorded nearly 20 sides for Decca and eight sides for Bluebird. She also toured extensively in the 1930s, mainly in the South.

In 1938, Minnie returned to recording for the Vocalion label, this time accompanied by Charlie McCoy, Kansas Joe McCoy's brother, on mandolin. Around this time, she married guitarist and singer Ernest Lawlars, known as Little Son Joe. They began recording together in 1939, with Son adding a more rhythmic backing to Minnie's guitar. They recorded for Okeh Records in the 1940s and continued to record together through the decade. By 1941, Minnie had started playing electric guitar, and in May of that year, she recorded her biggest hit, "Me and My Chauffeur Blues". Minnie's adoption of electric guitar placed her at the forefront of the stylistic shift in blues. Sonnet Retman describes her amplified playing as part of an emerging "Afro-Sonic modernity", where musicians combined aspects of rural country blues with the new electric sound. Her articulation, rhythmic drive, and experimentation with amplification of the electric guitar bridged the acoustic country traditions in which she grew up, in tandem with the postwar electric blues, encouraging younger Chicago players who followed suit. A follow-up date produced two more blues standards, "Looking the World Over" and Lawlars' "Black Rat Swing" (issued under the name "Mr. Memphis Minnie"). In the 1940s, Minnie and Lawlars continued to work at their "home club", Chicago's popular 708 Club, where they were often joined by Broonzy, Sunnyland Slim, or Snooky Pryor, and also played at many of the other better-known Chicago nightclubs. During the 1940s, Minnie and Lawlars performed together and separately in the Chicago and Indiana areas. Minnie often played at "Blue Monday" parties at Ruby Lee Gatewood's, on Lake Street. The poet Langston Hughes, who saw her perform at the 230 Club on New Year's Eve, 1942, wrote of her "hard and strong voice" being made harder and stronger by amplification and described the sound of her electric guitar as "a musical version of electric welders plus a rolling mill."

Later in the 1940s, Minnie lived in Indianapolis and Detroit. She returned to Chicago in the early 1950s. By the late 1940s, clubs had begun hiring younger and cheaper artists, and Columbia had begun dropping blues artists, including Memphis Minnie. Unable to adapt to changing tastes, she moved to smaller labels, such as Regal, Checker, and J.O.B.

== Later life and death ==
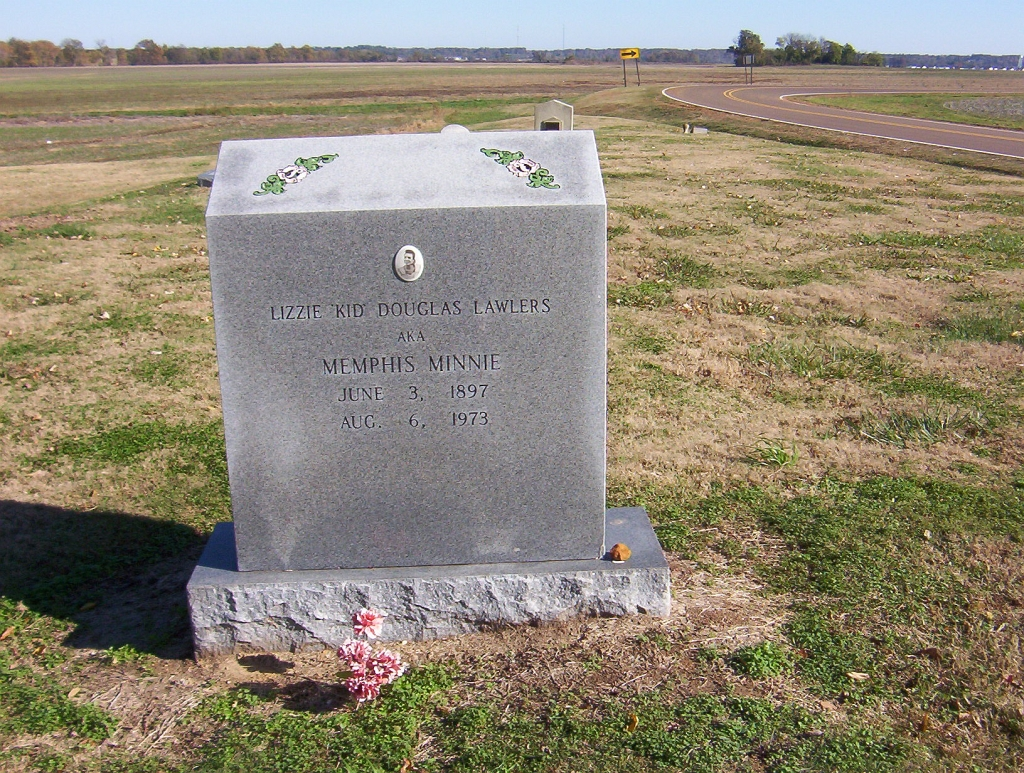
Memphis Minnie's grave (2008)

Minnie continued to record into the 1950s, but her health began to decline. With public interest in her music waning, she retired from her musical career, and in 1957, she and Lawlars returned to Memphis. Periodically, she appeared on Memphis radio stations to encourage young blues musicians. In 1958, she played at a memorial concert for Big Bill Broonzy. As the Garons wrote in Woman with Guitar, "She never laid her guitar down, until she could literally no longer pick it up." She suffered a stroke in 1960, which left her in a wheelchair. Lawlars died the following year, and Minnie had another stroke a short while after. She could no longer survive on her Social Security income. Magazines wrote about her plight, and readers sent her money for assistance. She spent her last years in the Jell Nursing Home, in Memphis, where she died of a stroke in 1973. She is buried at the New Hope Baptist Church Cemetery, in Walls, Mississippi. A headstone paid for by Bonnie Raitt was erected by the Mount Zion Memorial Fund on October 13, 1996, with 34 family members in attendance, including her sister Bob. The ceremony was taped for broadcast by the BBC. Her headstone is inscribed:

Lizzie "Kid" Douglas Lawlers aka Memphis Minnie

The inscription on the back of her gravestone reads:

The hundreds of sides Minnie recorded are the perfect material to teach us about the blues. For the blues are at once general, and particular, speaking for millions, but in a highly singular, individual voice. Listening to Minnie's songs, we hear her fantasies, her dreams, her desires, but we will hear them as if they were our own.

== Character and personal life ==
Minnie was known as a polished professional and an independent woman who knew how to take care of herself. She presented herself to the public as being feminine and ladylike, wearing expensive dresses and jewelry, but she was aggressive when she needed to be and was not shy when it came to fighting. According to the blues musician Johnny Shines, "Any men fool with her she'd go for them right away. She didn't take no foolishness off them. Guitar, pocket knife, pistol, anything she get her hand on she'd use it". According to Homesick James, she chewed tobacco all the time, even while singing or playing the guitar, and always had a cup at hand in case she wanted to spit. Most of the music she made was autobiographical; Minnie expressed a lot of her personal life in music.

Scholars have noted that Minnie's personal assertiveness aligned closely with her musical persona. Simon argues that her refusal to conform to the confinements of what people believed to be the ideal feminine role was a strategy that solidified her authority as a guitarist and leader. This perspective provides an alternative to the anecdotal accounts that emphasize her brave exterior, which overlook the artistic and social choices behind her presentation.

Minnie was married three times, although no marriage certificates have been found. Her first husband was Will Weldon, whom she is believed to have married in the early 1920s. Her second husband was guitarist and mandolin player Kansas Joe McCoy, whom she married in 1929. They filed for divorce in 1934. McCoy's jealousy of Minnie's professional success has been given as one reason for the breakup of their marriage. Minnie was also reported to have lived with a man known as "Squirrel" in the mid- to late 1930s. Around 1938, she met guitarist Ernest Lawlars (Little Son Joe), who became her new musical partner, and they married shortly thereafter; Minnie's union records, covering 1939 onwards, give her name as Minnie Lawlars. He dedicated songs to her, including "Key to the World", in which he addresses her as "the woman I got now" and calls her "the key to the world."

Minnie was not religious and rarely went to church. The only time she was reported to have gone to church was to see a gospel group perform. She was baptized shortly before she died, probably to please her sister Daisy Johnson. A house in Memphis where she once lived, at 1355 Adelaide Street, was demolished in the early 2010s.

== Legacy ==
Memphis Minnie is a central innovator in both country and early electric blues. Evans situates her firmly within the Southern country blues, while emphasizing the creative aspect of her contributions. Retman similarly highlights her importance in shaping the electric blues sound, noting her guitar work bridging the Delta and Chicago blues themes together. Simon further points out Minnie's significance as one of the few women who command musical authority equal to men.

Memphis Minnie has been described as "the most popular female country blues singer of all time". Big Bill Broonzy said that she could "pick a guitar and sing as good as any man I've ever heard." Minnie lived to see a renewed appreciation of her recorded work during the revival of interest in blues music in the 1960s. She was an influence on later singers, such as Big Mama Thornton, Jo Ann Kelly and Erin Harpe. She was inducted into the Blues Foundation's Hall of Fame in 1980.

"Me and My Chauffeur Blues" was recorded by Jefferson Airplane on their debut album, Jefferson Airplane Takes Off, with Signe Anderson as lead vocalist. "Can I Do It for You" was recorded by Donovan in 1965, under the title "Hey Gyp (Dig the Slowness)". A 1929 Memphis Minnie and Kansas Joe McCoy song, "When the Levee Breaks", was adapted (with altered lyrics and a different melody) by Led Zeppelin and released in 1971 on their fourth album. "I'm Sailin'" was covered by Mazzy Star on their 1990 debut album, She Hangs Brightly. Mazzy Star also recorded Minnie's "Bake My Biscuit" which appeared on their EP single in 1994 titled "Fade Into You" which was the second release of the track due to growing popularity. This EP also contained three other Mazzy tracks; a LP alternative version track, an album out take, and Minnie's "Bake My Biscuit" as a vocal and guitar only performance by Hope Sandoval and David Roback. The EP credits "Bake My Biscuit" to "Memphis McCoy" as "McCoy" was the name of Minnie's second husband and band partner. Yet the EP states Minnie's publishing of the 1929 track as "unknown". Her family is currently suing record companies and some artists for royalties and for using her music without permission. In 2007, Minnie was honored with a marker on the Mississippi Blues Trail in Walls, Mississippi.

== Discography ==
Minnie's recording show how her music developed from country to electric blues. Early songs like "Bumble Bee" and "When the Levee Breaks" reflect her roots in Southern blue tradition, while later songs such as "Me and My Chauffeur Blues" show the assertive lyrical style and presence that Simon highlights in her work. Minnie's amplified recordings from the 1940s display the "scientific sound" Retman links to the juke box era and demonstrate her influence on the rise of the electrical blues guitar.

=== Compilations ===
Year	Title	Genre	Label
1964	Blues Classics by Memphis Minnie	blues	Blues Classics
c. 1967	Early Recordings with Kansas Joe McCoy, vol. 2	blues	Blues Classics
1968	Love Changin' Blues: 1949, Blind Willie McTell and Memphis Minnie	blues	Biograph Records
1973	1934–1941	blues	Flyright Records
1973	1941–1949	blues	Flyright Records
1977	Hot Stuff: 1936–1949	blues	Magpie Records
1982	World of Trouble	blues	Flyright Records
1983	Moaning the Blues	blues	MCA Records
1984	In My Girlish Days: 1930–1935	blues	Travelin' Man
1987	1930–1941	blues	Old Tramp
1988	I Ain't No Bad Gal	blues	CBS
1991	Hoodoo Lady (1933–1937)	blues	Columbia
1994	In My Girlish Days	blues	Blues Encore
1996	Let's Go to Town	blues	Orbis
1997	Queen of the Blues	blues	Columbia
1997	"The Queen of the Blues": 1929–1941	blues	Frémeaux & Associés
2000	Pickin' the Blues	blues	Catfish Records
2003	Me and My Chauffeur Blues	blues	Proper Records Ltd.
2007	Complete Recorded Works 1935–1941 in Chronological Order, vol. 1, 10 January to 31 October 1935	blues	Document Records
unknown	Night Time Blues, Ma Rainey and Memphis Minnie	blues	History
2022	The Rough Guide to Memphis Minnie - Queen of the Country Blues	blues	World Music Networks

== Sources ==
- Garon, Paul, and Garon, Beth (1992). Woman with Guitar: Memphis Minnie's Blues. New York: Da Capo Press.
- Harris, Sheldon, (1989). Blues Who's Who. 5th paperback ed. New York: Da Capo Press.
