= Ballymun Concrete News =

Defunct Irish newspaper about Ballymun

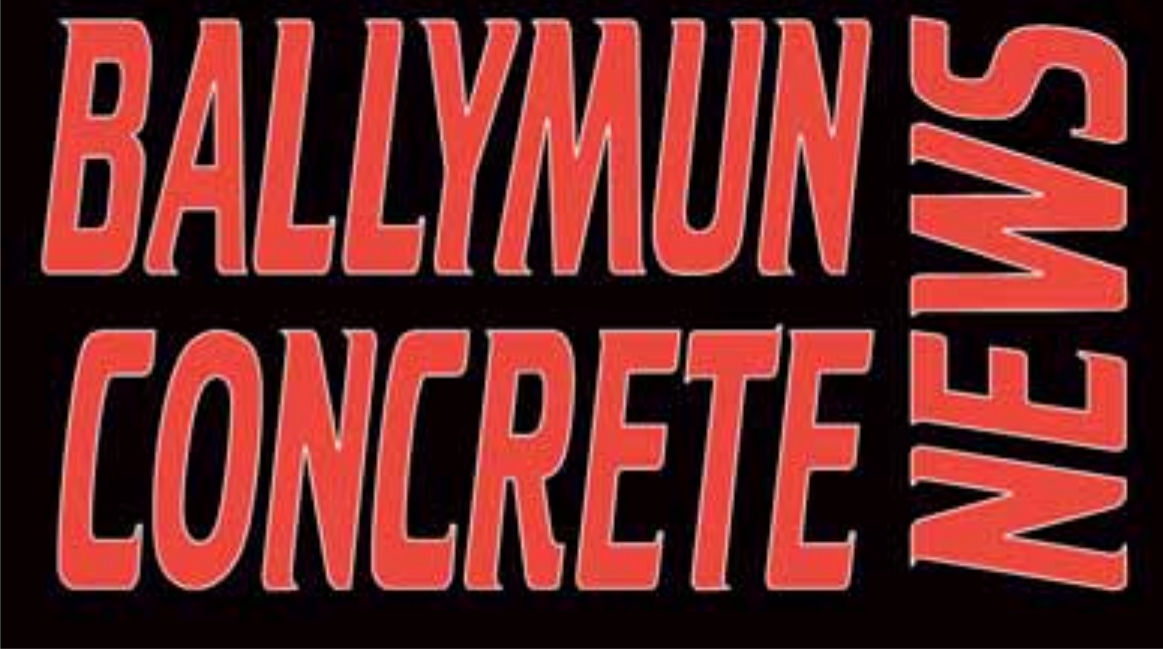
- Ballymun Concrete News logo

- Front page of the final Ballymun Concrete News issue (Volume 8, Issue 2)
- Format: Tabloid
- Owner: Seamus Kelly
- Publisher: Seamus Kelly
- Founded: 27 July 1988
- Ceased publication: March 2006
- Language: English
- City: Ballymun, Dublin, Ireland
- Country: Ireland
- Circulation: Northside, Dublin, Ireland
- Free online archives: Yes

The Ballymun Concrete News, also known as The Concrete News, was a hyperlocal newspaper that ran in Ballymun, Dublin, Ireland, from July 1988 until May 2006. It was written and published by local resident Seamus Kelly, aiming to only report positive news stories about Ballymun during the Ballymun Regeneration. The newspaper earned revenue from advertisements from local businesses, Ballymun Regeneration Limited and Dublin City Council. At the time of its closure, the "one-man free newspaper" consisted of an eight page tabloid that was distributed to 20,000 homes in Northside, Dublin, Ireland. In all, 87 editions of the newspaper were published.

== History ==
The Ballymun Concrete News started out in July 1988 as a one-page photocopied Microsoft Word document. According to his memoir Written in Concrete, it was created by Kelly to combat the negative reputation of Ballymun in Irish media.

The newspaper was "relying on advertising from the tenants" of Ballymun Shopping Centre, and shut down in March 2006 when the proposed project to replace the shopping centre failed to materialise.

== Legacy ==
In 2005, Seamus Kelly was featured on an episode of the RTÉ One documentary program City Folk.

In February and March 2016, Kelly held an art exhibition in the Axis Art Centre and Theatre in Ballymun that consisted of several photographs taken for Ballymun Concrete News to celebrate the 50th anniversary of the first people moving into Ballymun, the arts centre's 15th anniversary and to commemorate the demolition of the last Ballymun flat, Joseph Plunkett Tower.

In 2013, all 87 issues of Ballymun Concrete News were donated to Dublin City Library and Archive, which then digitally archived them.
