= Zipporah Potter Atkins =

African-American landowner (1645–1705)

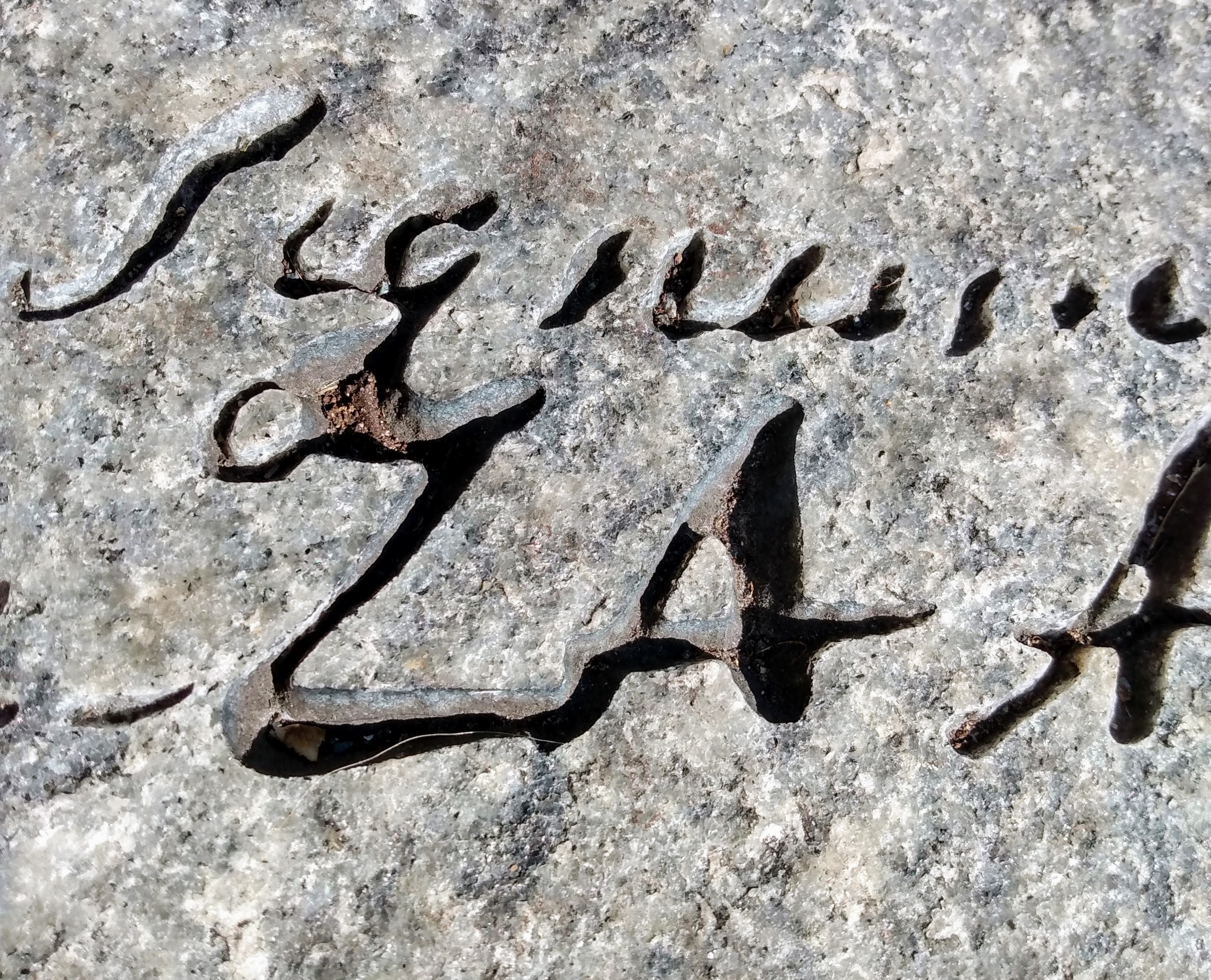
Zipporah Potter Atkins was the first known Black woman to own property in Boston MA, and the first to sign a deed in the Suffolk county records. The ZA is copied from the deed, in her hand.

Zipporah Potter Atkins (July 4, 1645 – January 8, 1705 age 60) was a free African American woman who owned land in colonial Boston, during a time when few women or African Americans owned land in the American Colonies. The purchase of her home, dated 1670, makes her the first African American to own land in the city of Boston, and with Anthony Johnson one of the earliest African-American landowners in what would become the United States.

== Biography ==
Zipporah Potter was born to Richard and Grace, slaves of Captain Robert Keayne, in the Massachusetts Bay Colony in the mid-1600s. Children born to slaves in Boston at that time were considered free upon birth, explaining Zipporah's status as a free African American in colonial Boston. Taking the surname of Atkins upon marriage, Zipporah is reported to have had six surnames in total. Her marriage was reportedly officiated by the prominent Puritan minister Cotton Mather. After her death, Atkins was laid to rest in Copp's Hill Burying Ground at an unknown location.

== Pioneering landowner ==
According to historical records, Zipporah Potter Atkins was able to purchase her property through an inheritance she received from her father. Her property was situated on the edge of Boston's North End, near a mill pond which flowed into Boston Harbor. The lot can be seen on a map of Boston drawn from records from 1676; the name "Potter" at the south eastern edge of the Mill Pond indicates the property. She owned her property while a single woman, managing to maintain control of her land through the course of her marriage. As she owned her property between the years 1670 and 1699, Atkins was the first recorded African American to own land in Boston. A portion of the property which had been purchased originally for 46 pounds was sold in 1693 for 100 pounds. She also learned to read well enough to at least sign her initials, during a time when many people could not read. When she signed the deed to sell her home in 1699, she became the first African American woman to initial a deed in Suffolk County, Massachusetts.

== Legacy ==
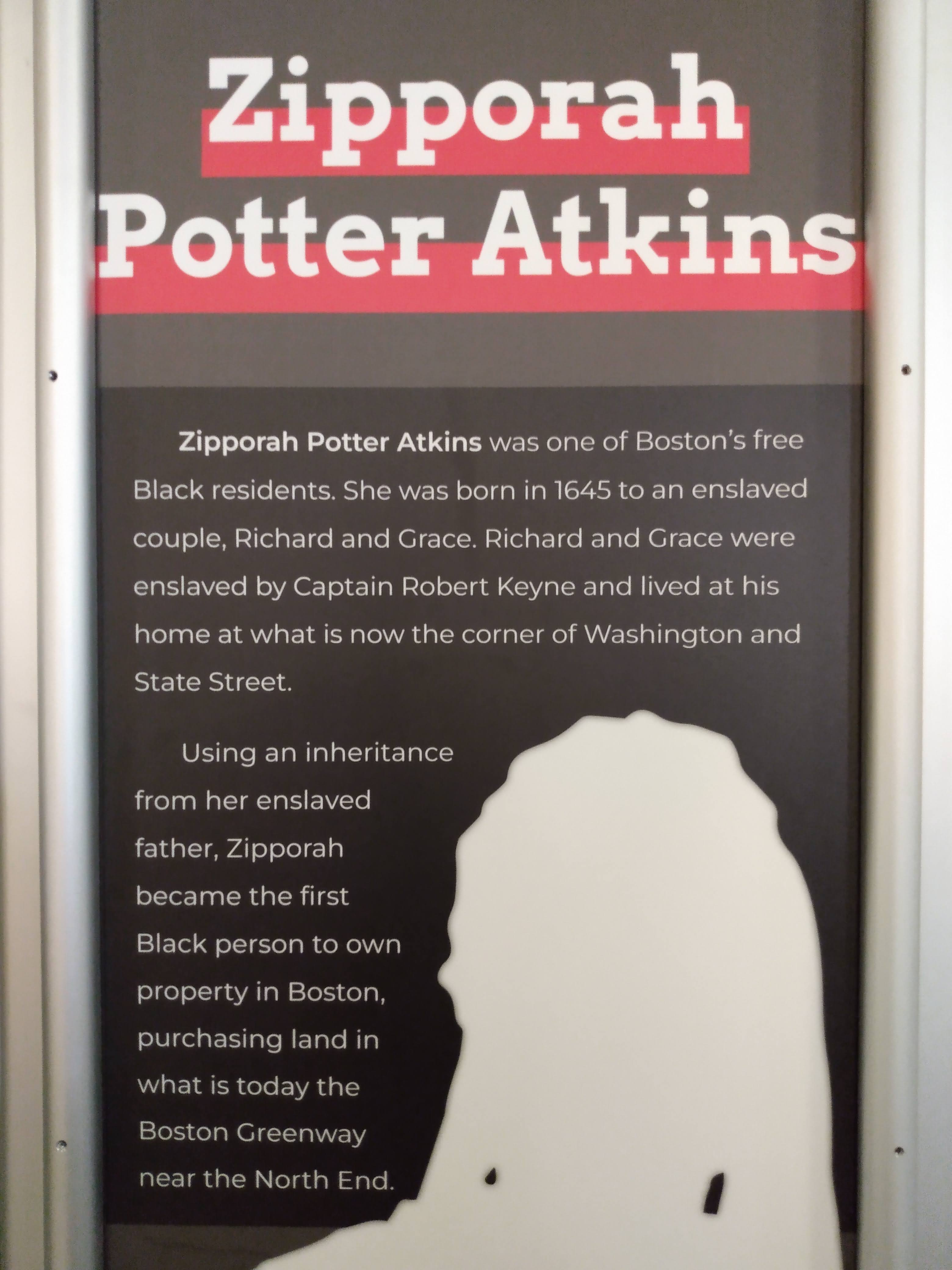
An information panel in the Boston National Historic Park installation in Faneuil Hall.

Dr. Vivian Johnson, a retired professor of education at Boston University, discovered documentation of Zipporah's property records around 2009. Following years of research on the part of Dr. Johnson, then-Governor Deval Patrick unveiled a memorial to Zipporah Potter Atkins on the Rose Fitzgerald Kennedy Greenway. Dr. Johnson held a talk titled "Free, Black and Female: The Zipporah Potter Atkins Story of Homeownership in Colonial Boston" at the Museum of African American History in Boston in May 2014.

The location of the Zipporah Potter Atkins Memorial stone can be found on the Boston Women's Heritage Trail tour of the North End.

An exhibit about slavery in Boston, installed in Faneuil Hall, also highlights Zipporah's important place in Boston's history.

From August 2024 to October 2025, the Greenway hosted a site-specific art project by LaRissa Rogers, titled "Going to Ground," that honored Atkins's life and home. As part of the project, Bostonians were invited to send in soil from places that were meaningful to them and the soil was made into bricks incorporated in the artwork.
