= History of Koreans in Boston =

The Boston metropolitan area has an active Korean American community. The largest groups of Koreans in Massachusetts in 2000 were in Boston, Brookline, Cambridge, Newton, and Somerville.

== History ==
In 1883, Yu Kil-Chun (1856–1914) arrived in the United States as a member of Korea's first diplomatic delegation and attended Dummer Academy (now The Governor's Academy) in Byfield, Massachusetts, becoming the first Korean student to study in the United States. During his stay, he befriended Edward S. Morse, the director of the Peabody Academy of Science, a predecessor institution of the Peabody Essex Museum in Salem, MA. Yu Kil-Chun donated his Korean clothing and other belongings to Edward S. Morse, who was associated with the Peabody Academy of Science.

In 1907 Syngman Rhee began attending Harvard University. Students made up a significant portion of the early Korean population in the Boston area. By 1945, the Korean population of the Boston area consisted largely of higher-education students, Christian missionaries and ministers, and government officials.

Harvard–Yenching Institute began offering PhD fellowships to South Koreans in 1953, leading to the development of the Korean community in the Boston area.

Boston University archives records documents from the first organized civic group. The Korean Society of Boston was established in 1953 by the joint efforts of Dr. Seo Du-su (1907-1994) and Dr. Ko Kwang-lim (1920-1989). At the time, Dr. Seo was a visiting professor at the Harvard–Yenching Institute and Dr. Ko was a doctoral candidate at Harvard Law School. According to the Korean Diaspora Project, both men saw a need to form an organization for the Korean diaspora in the Boston area to provide practical and emotional support to Koreans, as well as to build relationships with one another in anticipation of future collaboration as leading intellectuals in the United States.

The Korean Society of Boston over the decades as evolved. In 1989, the Korean American leaders created and established the Korean American Citizens League of New England, Inc. (KACL-NE). In 2024, KACL-NE together with community and business leaders including the Massachusetts Korean Cultural Society and the Massachusetts NAICFM branch with the financial assistance from Eastern Bank created and established the Moon Awards to recognize the contributions of Korean Americans and allies of the Korean American community.

Today, KACL-NE remains one of the oldest and most well established Korean American organizations in Massachusetts. In 2023, KACL-NE (https://www.kacl-ne.org) acknowledged the diversity that exists within the Korean American community and elected and voted into office as its first mixed race Korean American president, Linda Champion, a lawyer and educator. President Champion is the first Black Korean American woman to lead a historic Korean organization in the United States. This bold move by KACL-NE created a pathway to growing its base and expanding its programming to include all generations of Korean Americans including Korean adoptees in Massachusetts and throughout New England. KACL-NE is located in Massachusetts, KACL-NE is a branch of the national organization and has been in existence for over 33 years. The organization is dedicated to Korean American civic engagement, leadership development, civic engagement, and political empowerment. KACL-NE has approximately 300 members. The Chairman Emeritus Song Kim, a Korean American lawyer, was selected by the Korean community and bestowed the 2024 Moon Award for Volunteer of the Decade. In 2010, Attorney Kim described KACL-NE members are highly educated and come from professional backgrounds. In 2010 and today, it remains one of the largest Korean American organizations in the state and provides an array of activities such as a scholarship to complete civic engagement leadership summer program for Korean American college and high school students, leadership development and training through corporate officer and board development, cultural enrichment programs, and voter registration drives. Members of KACL-NE also personally strive to promote Korean American participation in electoral politics, says Kim. Today, Peter Kim of Cambridge is one of the most significant Korean Americans influencing politics, business, and culture in America.

Korean American participation in politics: election of Sam Yoon to the Boston City Council as an encouraging development, election of Maria_Robinson, Daniel_Koh unsuccessful run for Congress, Linda Champion unsuccessful run for Suffolk County District Attorney.

== Geography ==
As of 2010 there were 1,600 ethnic Koreans in Allston and Brighton, making up over one third of the Koreans in Boston. In 2012 Matt Rocheleau of the Boston Globe wrote "Allston is becoming the Koreatown of Boston." The number of Koreans in Allston and Brighton increased 54% from 2000 to 2010. By 2012 Koreans in Allston and Brighton had established various Korean businesses. The neighborhoods' proximity to educational institutions attracted ethnic Koreans.

In addition to the Allston area, as of 2012 there are significant Korean populations in Brookline and Cambridge.

== Media ==
Boston Korea is a weekly Korean American newspaper established in 2005, whose primary market is Boston, Massachusetts, and its surrounding area. Boston Korea is headquartered in the Allston area of Boston. The owner and founder of Boston Korea is Myongsool Chang. Chang immigrated to the United States from Seoul Korea in 1998. Chang is a Lexington, Massachusetts resident and in 2006 he moved the newspaper offices from Newton, Massachusetts to Allston. Chang stated that the Allston location had a closer proximity to the newspaper's sources and readers than the Newton location.

The Korean-American community recognized and honored Myongsool Chang, as Entrepreneur of the Year receiving the 2024 Moon Award created by award winning artist Yeonsoo Kim. Chang was selected based upon his contributions to the Korean community throughout New England by keeping Korean and Korean-Americans connected. Yeonsoo Kim after a competitive search was bestowed the honor of creating original Moon Jars.

== Institutions ==
On Thanksgiving Sunday in 1953 Harvard-Yenching Institute visiting professor Dr. Doo Soo Suh and Harvard Law School PhD candidate Dr. Kwang Lim Koh established the Korean Society of Boston. When Suh resigned from his position, Korean students took control of the organization.

== Museum Collections ==
The Peabody Essex Museum (PEM) is the oldest continuously operating museum in the United States and the first American institution to collect Korean art. In spring 2025, the PEM opens the Yu Kil-Chun Gallery of Korean Art and Culture a landmark installation of the museum’s remarkable Korean collection.

== Religion ==
The first Korean Church of Boston held its first services on Thanksgiving Sunday, 1953. Rev. Daesun Park, graduate student Dr. Kwang Lim Koh, and some other Korean graduate students established the church.
