= Men of All Colors Together (Boston) =

Anti Racist and Lgbt advocacy organization

Men of All Colors Together Boston
- Founded: 1981
- Dissolved: 1999
- Type: Non-profit educational
- Location: Boston, Massachusetts, United States
- Region served: Boston, Massachusetts

The Boston Chapter of Black and White Men Together (BWMT-Boston), or Men of All Colors Together (MACT-Boston) as their chapter would come to be known, was founded on June 10, 1980, as part of The National Association of Black and White Men Together (NABWMT), making it the first interracial gay organization on the East Coast. The two major goals of the Boston chapter of MACT were to continue combating racism, particularly within the LGBT community, while simultaneously fighting to end homophobia in society as a whole. After NABWMT was founded in May 1980, Boston became one of the early adopter cities to create a chapter within the year along with New York, Philadelphia, Baltimore, Washington DC, Los Angeles, Memphis, Chicago, Detroit, Atlanta, and Milwaukee.

== Naming the chapter ==
In December 1987 the group elected to change the name of their chapter from Black and White Men Together, to Men of All Colors Together. After having originally chosen the name for the shock value the name began to become less reflect of their mission. They felt that the BWMT name was not inclusive enough and may discourage men of other races from joining. Nor did the name challenge discriminatory norms of society other than black-white racism. They arrived at the conclusion that MACT embodied their organizations main focus of encouraging interactions between all races and fighting discrimination and homophobia in all forms. By this time chapters in New York, Connecticut, and Cincinnati had already adopted the MACT name. Other NABWMT chapters also chose to change their name adopting People of All Colors Together or PACT.

== Goals and impact ==
The Boston chapter of MACT engaged in activities, both internally and within the community at large, that aimed to promote racial equality in the LGBT community and to aid the LGBT community as a whole. In 1989 the chapter began to publish their aims in their newsletters; they were:

- To offer an opportunity for socializing between gay men of all colors and an atmosphere which is conducive to forming friendships and which provides support for ongoing relationships
- To encourage the examination of our personal feelings regarding race and to provide a supportive forum for exploring them together.
- To actively engage in the struggle for racial understanding in Boston and the New England area, especially in the gay community.

MACT Boston established an "AIDing Task Force" in order to educate on and combat the AIDS epidemic affecting the gay community. The task force was led by Boston MACT member Tom Ferrick. Their efforts included entering a wide variety of medical pamphlets into their newsletters, inviting members of the medical community to come and speak in open forums, and outreach to help inform the LGBT community about HIV/AIDS transmission on and stem the stigmatized association between the disease and the LGBT community. They were particularly active in their educational programs within the African American community as well.

== Social and community ==
The members of MACT created several traditional social events that allowed members to gather outside the formalities of meetings. These included educational, cultural, and political activities ranging from annual holiday parties for Halloween and Christmas, to community outreach programs in which they would hand out flyers informing the public about the LGBT lifestyle. In attempts to foster a sense of community amongst its members MACT frequently engaged in excursions designed to allot time for members to bond. Activities often included engaging in the culture of Boston with trips to restaurants, movies, and museums.

MCAT focused on adding racial harmony to the LGBT community at large. "To attain these ends, its local chapters organized social gatherings and engage in educational, cultural, and political activities. NABWMT's goals consist of two major themes: combating racism within the LGBT community and combating homophobia in general society."

== Conventions ==
NABWMT holds a convention annually in which all chapters are invited to attend and discuss the years events and engage in seminars that aim to help improve the effectiveness of the individual chapters. The eighth annual NABWT convention was held in the City of Boston in July 1988 at the Park Plaza Hotel. The Boston chapter created the symbol for the convention of two pandas holding hands. The convention was attended by 23 NABWT chapters from across the country. The MACT Boston chapter successfully lobbied to have the City of Boston declare the week of the convention, July 4–9, 1988, NABWMT Week in the City of Boston.
