= Muriel S. Snowden =

American community activist

- Born: Muriel Sophronia Sutherland; July 14, 1916
- Died: September 30, 1988 (aged 72); Boston, Massachusetts, U.S.
- Education: Radcliffe College
- Spouse: Otto P. Snowden

Muriel Sophronia Sutherland Snowden (July 14, 1916 – September 30, 1988) was the founder and co-director of Freedom House, a community improvement center in Roxbury, Massachusetts. She is, together with her husband Otto P. Snowden, a major figure in Boston history and activism.

== Early life ==
Snowden was born Muriel Sophronia Sutherland and raised in Glen Ridge, New Jersey. Through her father, she was descended from the 19th century freedman Scipio Vaughan, whose descendants on three continents would go on to become one of the world's most illustrious Black families by the early 21st century.

Snowden graduated as valedictorian of her high school in 1934. She attended Radcliffe College, graduating in 1938. She then worked as a volunteer for a settlement house in Newark and an investigator for the Essex County Welfare Board. She also studied at the New York School of Social Work from 1943 to 1945 and funded her education with a fellowship from the National Urban League. She married Otto P. Snowden in 1944, and they moved to Boston. Gail Snowden, their only child, was born in 1945.

== Freedom House ==
The Snowdens founded Freedom House, an organization that advocated for self-help and integration for African Americans in Boston's Roxbury neighborhood, in 1949. After operating Freedom House out of their home for three years, the Snowdens purchased a building that previously housed the Hebrew Teachers College on Crawford Street in Roxbury to serve as its permanent location. Freedom House became a well-known and active advocacy organization in Upper Roxbury, at times even known as the "Black Pentagon" because it was the major meeting spot for Boston's African-American activist community. Speaking of her family's commitment to living in the Roxbury neighborhood in an era when it suffered from blight, arson, and other crime, Muriel Snowden once said "We decided long ago we weren't going anywhere, and we were going to stay here ... This is a commitment. You have a direction, a feeling about where you're going." Muriel and Otto Snowden retired from active involvement in Freedom House in 1984; their daughter Gail later became chair of the Foundation's board.

== Other work ==
Snowden served as executive director of the Cambridge Civic Unity Committee from 1948 to 1950, until she left to dedicate her full-time to Freedom House. She also taught community organization at the Simmons College School of Social Work as an adjunct instructor from 1958 to 1970. Snowden served on the boards of many organizations, including University of Massachusetts Amherst, the Associated Harvard Alumni, the Radcliffe College Alumnae Association, Babson College, Shawmut Bank, the board of overseers of Harvard College, and the Racial Imbalance Committee of the Massachusetts Department of Education.

== Awards ==
- MacArthur Fellowship (1987)
- Harvard Medal (1986)
- Honorary doctorate, University of Massachusetts (1968)
- Alumnae Achievement Award, Radcliffe College (1964)

== Death and legacy ==
Snowden died from cancer at the age of 72, on September 30, 1988.

The Snowden International School, near Copley Square in Boston, credits her for their international-themed curriculum and is named after her. Her papers are held at Northeastern University as part of the Freedom House Collection in its Library Archives and Special Collections Department.
