= Freedom House (Roxbury, Massachusetts) =

Nonprofit community-based organization

Coordinates: 42°18′38″N 71°5′3″W

Freedom House is a nonprofit community-based organization in Roxbury, Massachusetts (a neighborhood of Boston). Freedom House is located in an area sometimes referred to as Grove Hall that lies along Blue Hill Ave. at the border between the Roxbury and Dorchester neighborhoods of Boston. Although it was historically identified with Roxbury, Freedom House currently refers to itself as being located either in Dorchester or in Grove Hall.

== Mission ==
The mission of Freedom House is to promote economic self-sufficiency and social justice for residents in historically underserved neighborhoods through targeted educational development, increased civic and political engagement and progressive cultural advocacy.

== History ==
Freedom House was founded in 1949 as a center of civil rights and advocacy for Boston's African American community. The founders were the social workers (and married couple) Otto P. Snowden and Muriel S. Snowden. The initial goal of Freedom House was to centralize community activism in the fight for neighborhood improvement, good schools, and harmony among racial, ethnic, and religious groups in Roxbury (a neighborhood of Boston), Massachusetts. Criticized in the 1960s by black militants for taking a "self-help" approach to racial equality, Freedom House re-examined its mission, and went on to play an increasingly critical role in the struggle for civil rights in Boston, especially during the period of desegregation of Boston's public schools.

Freedom House's original location was at 151 Humboldt Street in Roxbury. In 1952, it moved to 14 Crawford Street on the Grove Hall section of Roxbury. On the night of January 31, 1960, a fire destroyed the Crawford Street facility. A rebuilding campaign ensued, and Boston Mayor John F. Collins was the first to "buy a brick" to help in this effort. The rebuilt facility opened in 1961 and remains the current home of the organization.

In 1984, Muriel and Otto Snowden retired as co-directors. A number of directors have served since then; the Executive Director is currently the Snowden's daughter, Gail Snowden.

In 1996, Freedom House considered merging with other community organizations, although in the end it decided not to do so.

== Activities ==
The initial focus of the organization was on urban renewal; neighborhood improvement programs designed to protect Upper Roxbury from urban blight began in 1949 when Freedom House helped to organize neighborhood clean-up projects and playground construction. Concerned over the escalating number of bars in the neighborhood, Freedom House led the community in an effort to reduce the number of new and renewed applications for liquor licenses.

Early programming also focused on strengthening relations between the African American and Jewish residents of Upper Roxbury. An interracial preschool, one of few in the city, was established and Freedom House participated in a Black-Jewish Roundtable fostering business ties and friendships between black and Jewish entrepreneurs.

In the area of education, Freedom House administered Project Reach, supported by a private donation, which gave scholarship funds for minority students to go to college. Freedom House also provided scholarship counseling. A travel/study program provided scholarships for high school students to study in Europe for the summer. In the years before court-ordered desegregation, Freedom House also raised money to support Operation Exodus, a voluntary desegregation project that bused predominantly African American students from overcrowded schools in Roxbury and Dorchester to predominantly white, underenrolled schools in other parts of Boston. In 1966, Operation Exodus discontinued busing children; the Metropolitan Council for Educational Opportunity (METCO) began busing Boston children between the city and suburban schools on a voluntary basis. Exodus bused children within the City of Boston while METCO was a separate program of urban and suburban exchange.

School desegregation was court-ordered in Boston in 1974, and in that year, the Freedom House Institute on Schools and Education was established. The Institute began as a means of information dissemination to African-American families, as well as to ensure the safety of school children being bused to neighborhoods attempting to block the desegregation order. The Institute grew to become a locus of community action, offering tutoring and teacher training, and providing a forum for communication between families and city administrators.

In the area of employment, Freedom House held job fairs, including Boston's first job fair for minorities, and promoted affirmative action. They raised money for college scholarships for black students and for study programs in Africa. They even established a credit union.

Freedom House has often acted as a forum and meeting place for the community, in times of grief as well as in times of celebration. The Center has held galas, fashion shows and tea parties to raise money for causes that it supported, celebrated the anniversaries and birthdays of notables like Edward Brooke, an African-American U.S. Senator from Massachusetts, and held Christmas and Halloween parties for children. More than 500 residents attended a mass meeting at Freedom House after the murder of 16-year-old Daniela Saunders in 1963.

Currently, Freedom House programs focus on education, technology, and leadership development. Freedom House provides tutoring for the MCAS (Mass. school achievement tests), access to a computer lab, and technology training. Freedom House also works with other organizations and the City of Boston to lower the dropout rate in Boston's high schools.
