= Encyclopedia of Overseas Korean Culture =

South Korean online encyclopedia

The Encyclopedia of Overseas Korean Culture (Korean: 세계한민족문화대전; Hanja: 世界韓民族文化大典; short name 세계한민족) is a Korean-language online encyclopedia operated by the Academy of Korean Studies, which is in turn supported by the South Korean government. It focuses on the Korean diaspora.

Compilation work on the encyclopedia first began in 2011, with the scope initially focused on Koreans in China. That work completed in 2015, and they moved to focused on other major diaspora groups, including Koryo-saram (Central Asia, former Soviet Union), Korean Americans (United States), and Zainichi Koreans (and other Koreans in Japan). This work was completed by 2018. The encyclopedia reportedly received 500 million views between 2018 and 2022.

As of 2022, the encyclopedia is still actively being contributed to, with researchers sent to various places in the world to gather information for the encyclopedia.

In 2023, the encyclopedia became part of the China–Korea cultural conflict, in which some Chinese people seek greater emphasis on the Chinese origin of some Korean cultural concepts, such as kimchi (pao cai) and hanbok (hanfu). According to some South Korean politicians, some of the encyclopedia's articles promoted the Chinese origin of some cultural concepts too much.

== See also ==
- Category:South Korean online encyclopedias
- Category:Korean-language encyclopedias
