= Joseph L. Walcott =

Barbadian-American nightclub owner

Joseph L. Walcott was the first African American to own a nightclub in New England.

== Early life ==
A Barbadian who immigrated to America in 1910, he joined his brother in Boston. "Wally" worked at many jobs including running a taxi service where one of his customers was Boston mayor James Michael Curley. Mayor Curley helped Walcott to get a liquor license and in 1947 he used his savings to start Wally's Paradise at 428 Massachusetts Avenue in the South End of Boston, Massachusetts.

Wally brought many new musical acts to Boston, including Sarah Vaughn, Lena Horne, Coleman Hawkins, Oscar Peterson and Red Garland were just some of the legendary performers who played at Walcott's nightclub.

After Wally's death in 1998 at age 101, his three children took over the bar, and today Wally's Cafe is still owned and managed by his family: Walcott's daughter, Elynor, and his three grandsons, Paul, Frank, and Lloyd Poindexter. It is the oldest jazz club in the United States to be maintained and held by one family.
