= Waring Cuney =

American poet

William Waring Cuney
- Born: William Waring Cuney; May 6, 1906; Washington, D.C., US
- Died: June 30, 1976 (aged 70); New York City, US
- Occupation: Poet
- Writing career
- Years active: 1927–1962

William Waring Cuney (May 6, 1906 – June 30, 1976) was a poet of the Harlem Renaissance. He is best known for his poem "No Images," which has been widely anthologized.

== Biography ==
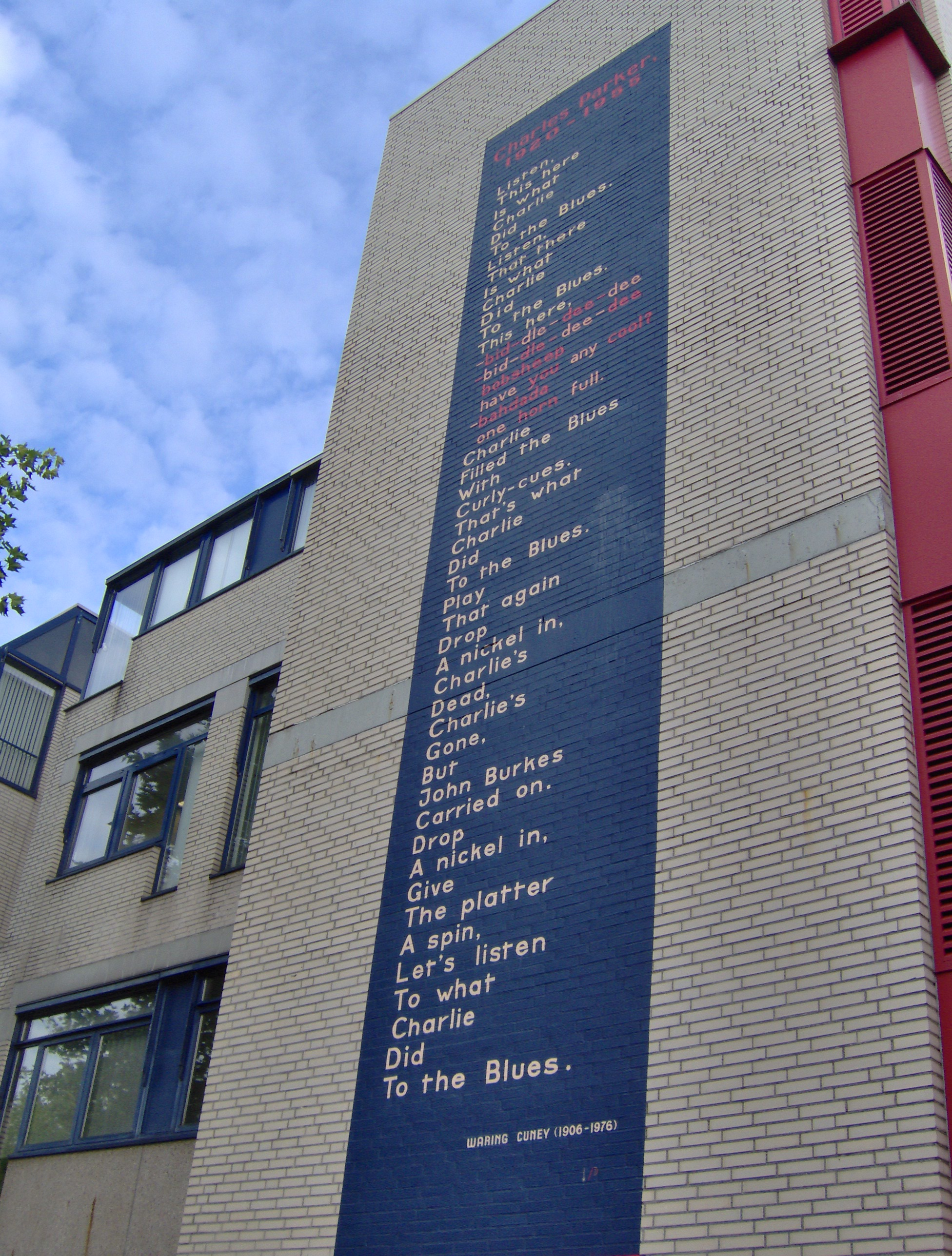
The poem "Charles Parker" on a wall in Leiden

William Waring Cuney was one of a pair of twins born on May 6, 1906, in Washington D.C. His father, Norris Wright Cuney II, worked for the federal government. His mother, Madge Louise Baker, taught in the D.C. public school system. Cuney attended the D.C. public schools, graduating from Armstrong High School. He attended Howard University for a time before earning his B.A. at Lincoln University in Pennsylvania. He also studied at the New England Conservatory of Music in Boston and the Conservatory of Music in Rome.

In 1926, while Cuney was still a student at Lincoln University, his poem "No Images" won first prize in a competition sponsored by Opportunity magazine. The poem poignantly portrays a black woman's internalization of European beauty standards. It has been widely anthologized and is considered a minor classic of the New Negro Movement.

At Lincoln University, Cuney was a classmate and friend of Langston Hughes. Decades later he co-edited an anthology with Hughes, Lincoln University Poets: Centennial Anthology, 1854–1954 (New York: Fine Editions, 1954).

After training for a career in music as a singer along with his brother who was a pianist, Cuney decided he had a poor singing voice and never performed professionally. His writing, however, was very much influenced by his love of music. His poems are strongly rhythmic, often written in ballad form or original forms reminiscent of blues songs. Many are character sketches of inner-city African Americans. A number of his poems have been set to music and recorded by Josh White, Al Haig, and Nina Simone. His poems were published in journals such as The Crisis and Black World, and in anthologies edited by Countee Cullen, James Weldon Johnson, Sterling Brown, and Arna Bontemps.

Although his work was largely forgotten in the United States by the 1950s, it was translated into German and Dutch and developed a following in Europe. He published only two volumes of poetry in his lifetime: Puzzles, a limited edition published in the Netherlands in 1960, and Storefront Church, published in London in 1973. He died in New York City on June 30, 1976.

== See also ==
- Norris Wright Cuney
- Maud Cuney Hare

== Works ==
- Puzzles.
- Storefront church. OCLC 6360639.
- Women and kitchens. OCLC 54175614.
- The alley cat brushed his wiskers. OCLC 54175554.
- Two poems : Darkness hides his throne; and, We make supplication. OCLC 54175586.
- Cuney, William Waring; Breman, Paul. Sometimes I wonder. OCLC 34142366.
