= Ernest Lawlars =

- Also known as: Little Son Joe
- Born: May 18, 1900; Hughes, Arkansas, United States
- Died: November 14, 1961 (aged 61) Memphis, Tennessee, United States
- Genres: Blues
- Occupation(s): Guitarist, vocalist, composer
- Instrument(s): Guitar, drums
- Years active: 1930s–1950s
- Labels: Vocalion, Columbia

Ernest Lawlars (May 18, 1900 – November 14, 1961) was an American blues guitarist, vocalist, and composer, known professionally as Little Son Joe.

== Early years and Memphis ==
Lawlars (sometimes spelled "Lawlers", "Lawler" or "Lawlar") was born in Hughes, Arkansas, United States. From around 1931 to 1936 he worked around Memphis with Robert Wilkins, who he accompanied on a recording session in 1935. The same session also produced Lawlers's first recorded side, under the name Son Joe, although this was not issued.

== Chicago ==
By 1939, Lawlars was working with, and married to, Memphis Minnie in Chicago. Their first recording session together, for Vocalion in February 1939, produced six released sides by Lawlers as well as four under Minnie's name. Lawlars recorded in his own right under the name Little Son Joe, but most of his recorded work was as an accompanist to Minnie. In 1942 he had a hit with "Black Rat Swing", billed as “Mr. Memphis Minnie”.

== Return to Memphis ==
Lawlars mostly retired from music from around 1957 because of ill-health, although after moving to Memphis in 1958 he and Minnie had a regular Saturday night gig at the Red Light in Millington, Tennessee, and he played drums on Minnie's final recording session in 1959.

== Death ==
Lawlars died in John Gaston Hospital, Memphis, Tennessee, in November 1961 from heart disease, and was buried in the New Hope Cemetery in Walls, Mississippi. In 2016 the Killer Blues Headstone Project placed a headstone for him there.

== Sources ==
- Garon, Paul and Beth Garon (1992). Woman With Guitar: Memphis Minnie's Blues. New York: Da Capo Press, ISBN 978-0306804601.
