= Otto P. Snowden =

Otto Phillip Snowden (1914–1995) was an influential 20th-century leader in Boston's African American community. Snowden and his wife, Muriel S. Snowden, were co-directors and founders of Freedom House in Roxbury from 1949 until their retirement in 1984.

== Early life and family ==
Otto P. Snowden was born in Phoebus, Virginia to Alice and Frank M. Snowden, Sr. His father was an army officer who retired as a colonel. He is the younger brother of Frank M. Snowden, Jr. In 1944, Snowden married Muriel Sutherland of New Jersey.

Snowden was a vocal advocate for civil rights as early as the 1920s. While a student at Lewis Intermediate School in Roxbury, he led his fellow students in a boycott against the school's track coach because he addressed black team members as "boy."

== Work, activism, and leadership roles ==
Snowden directed St. Mark Social Center in Roxbury, Massachusetts both before and after serving in World War II. He quit his job as director to work without pay to found Freedom House.

Otto Snowden was a commissioner of the City of Boston's Parks and Recreation Department from 1949 to 1956, and in 1975 he became a commissioner of the Boston Housing Authority. He was also involved in many professional and civic associations, including the Boston Branch NAACP; Booth Memorial Home of the Salvation Army; Work Incentive Program, Division of Employment Security; Boston City Department of Civil Defense, Disaster Squad; American Red Cross, Boston Chapter; Massachusetts Committee for Jobs Unlimited for Negroes and Other Minorities; Mayor's Committee on Civic Progress (Hynes); Citizens Advisory Committee on Urban Renewal (Collins); and the National Conference of Christians and Jews—New England Region. He was a trustee of Northeastern University from 1978 to 1995.

== Education ==
Snowden was a graduate of Dorchester High School, attended Howard University from 1933 to 1937 and was a special graduate student at Boston University School of Social Work.

Snowden received honorary degrees from Northeastern University in 1980 and from Boston College and Simmons College in 1984.

== Awards ==
In 1971 he was given the Man of the Year award from the Roxbury Kiwanis Club He was a recipient of a lifetime achievement award from the NAACP. Other awards include the Black Advocates for Quality Education award, and the Salvation Army Other award.

== Resources ==
- http://www.library.neu.edu/archives/collect/findaids/m17find.htm
- http://beta.worldcat.org/archivegrid/data/70953744
- http://www.use.salvationarmy.org/use/www_usn20.nsf/vw-text-dynamic-arrays/F74D62E42552DA77852579A3007B4147
