= Harry Williamson =

Harry Williamson may refer to:

- Harry Williamson (athlete) (1913–2000), American middle-distance runner
- Harry Williamson (musician) (born 1950), British musician, member of Ant-Bee
- Harry Albro Williamson (1875–1965), American Freemasonry historian
- H. H. Williamson (1916–1972), Canadian prospector and politician

== See also ==
- Henry Williamson (1895–1977), British author
