= African Lodge No. 459 =

Freemasonry lodge

African Lodge, No. 459 was the founding lodge of Prince Hall Freemasonry. It is the lodge from which all modern Prince Hall Lodges trace their descent.

== History ==
Prior to the American Revolutionary War, Prince Hall and fourteen other free black men petitioned for admittance to the (at that time all white) Boston St. John’s Lodge. They were turned down. Having been rejected by colonial Freemasonry, they petitioned to join a Masonic lodge attached to the 38th British Foot Infantry (then meeting at Castle William Island in Boston Harbor, Massachusetts) which operated under a charter from the Grand Lodge of Ireland.

They were accepted, becoming the first black men to be initiated into a Masonic Lodge in America. The regiment left Boston shortly after the start of the American Revolution, taking its lodge with it. Prince Hall and his associates received a "permit" from the Grand Lodge of Ireland to meet for the purpose of Masonic funeral services and processions. Under this permit, African Lodge was organized on July 3, 1776. Prince Hall was elected Worshipful Master. This permit, however, was limited. It did not allow them to do any "masonic work" or to take in any new members.

Hall then applied to the Grand Lodge of England for a more complete warrant (or charter). This request was granted on September 29, 1784, when H. R. H. The Duke of Cumberland, the Grand Master of the Premier Grand Lodge of England, issued a charter for "The African Lodge No. 1" (later renamed African Lodge No. 459.

== From Lodge to Grand Lodge ==
With a charter, African Lodge #459 could initiate more men from the free black community in Boston. In 1797 Prince Hall organized subsidiary lodges in Philadelphia, Pennsylvania, and Providence, Rhode Island. These operated under the charter of African Lodge (and initially were also given the name "African Lodge" and the number 459. The Lodge in Providence soon changed its name to Hiram Lodge #3). In December 1808, these three lodges met and formed the African Grand Lodge (sometime referred to as African Grand Lodge #1). In 1847, the African Grand Lodge changed its name to the Prince Hall Grand Lodge, in honor of their founding Grand Master. Other Prince Hall Grand Lodges were formed in other states, and today there are 47 Prince Hall Grand Lodges who trace their lineage to the original African Lodge.
