= Prince Hall Mystic Cemetery =

Historic cemetery in Massachusetts, United States

- U.S. National Register of Historic Places
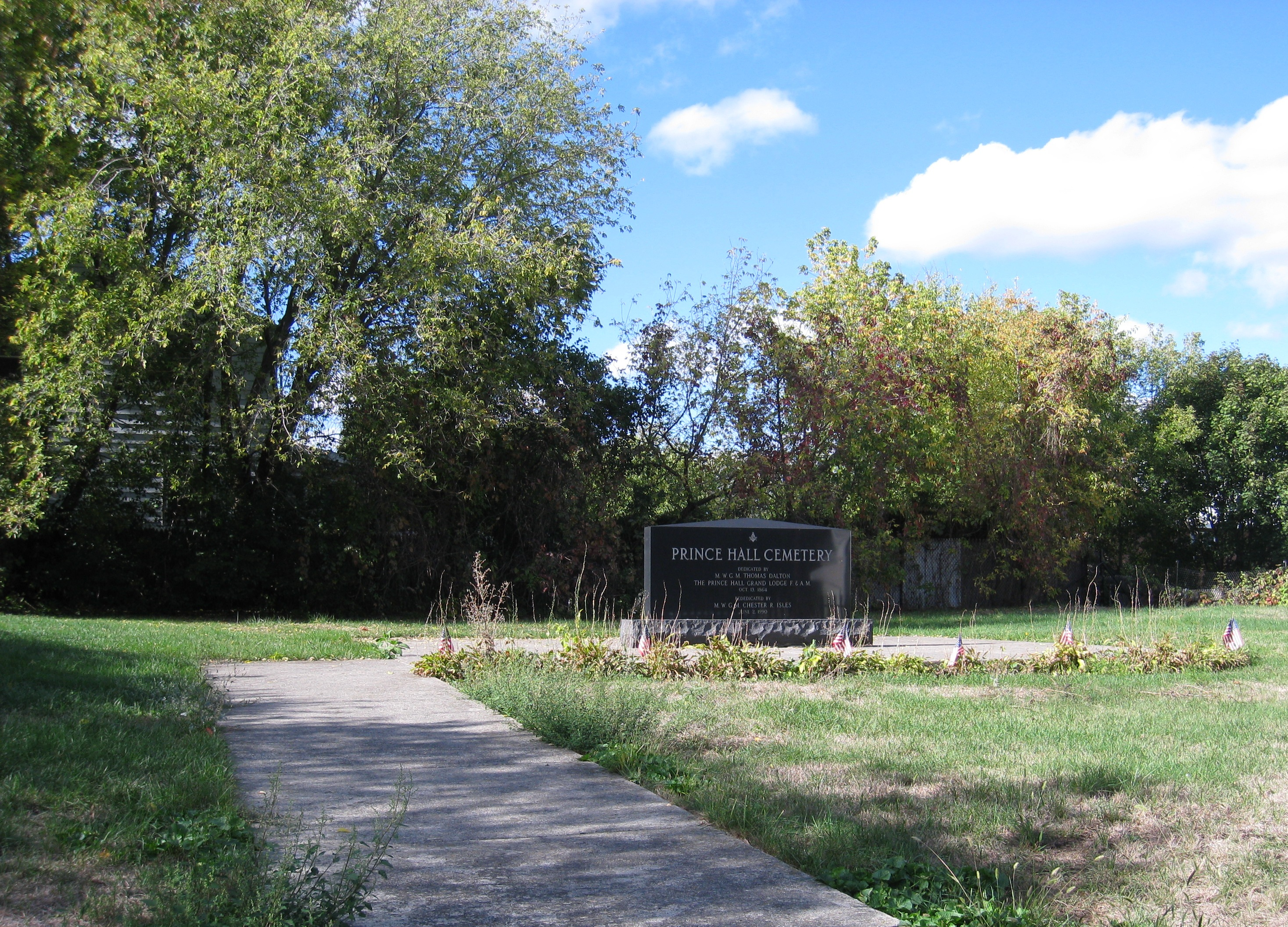
- Prince Hall Mystic Cemetery
- Nearest city: Arlington, Massachusetts
- Coordinates: 42°24′36.73″N 71°8′7.46″W
- NRHP reference No.: 97001473
- Added to NRHP: November 25, 1998

The Prince Hall Mystic Cemetery, also known as the Prince Hall Cemetery, is a historic cemetery located on Gardner Street, Arlington, Massachusetts, United States. It may be the only remaining African American Masonic cemetery in the United States.

The cemetery is a burial place for members of the Prince Hall Grand Lodge F & AM, founded by Prince Hall in Boston in 1776. Prince Hall Freemasonry was the first African American Masonic group in the United States. In 1864, Grand Master William B. Kendall deeded this site to his lodge. The cemetery was dedicated in 1868 and put in trust to be used exclusively as a Prince Hall Freemasonry burial ground. Records indicate it was in use until about 1897 when it fell into disuse.

As time passed it was forgotten until its rediscovery in 1987. It was rededicated in 1990 and added to the National Register of Historic Places in 1998. Today the cemetery is the last extant cemetery associated with Prince Hall Masons. It contains a small park with a monument. A 1988 survey found remains of the original gate and an obelisk.

== Current use ==
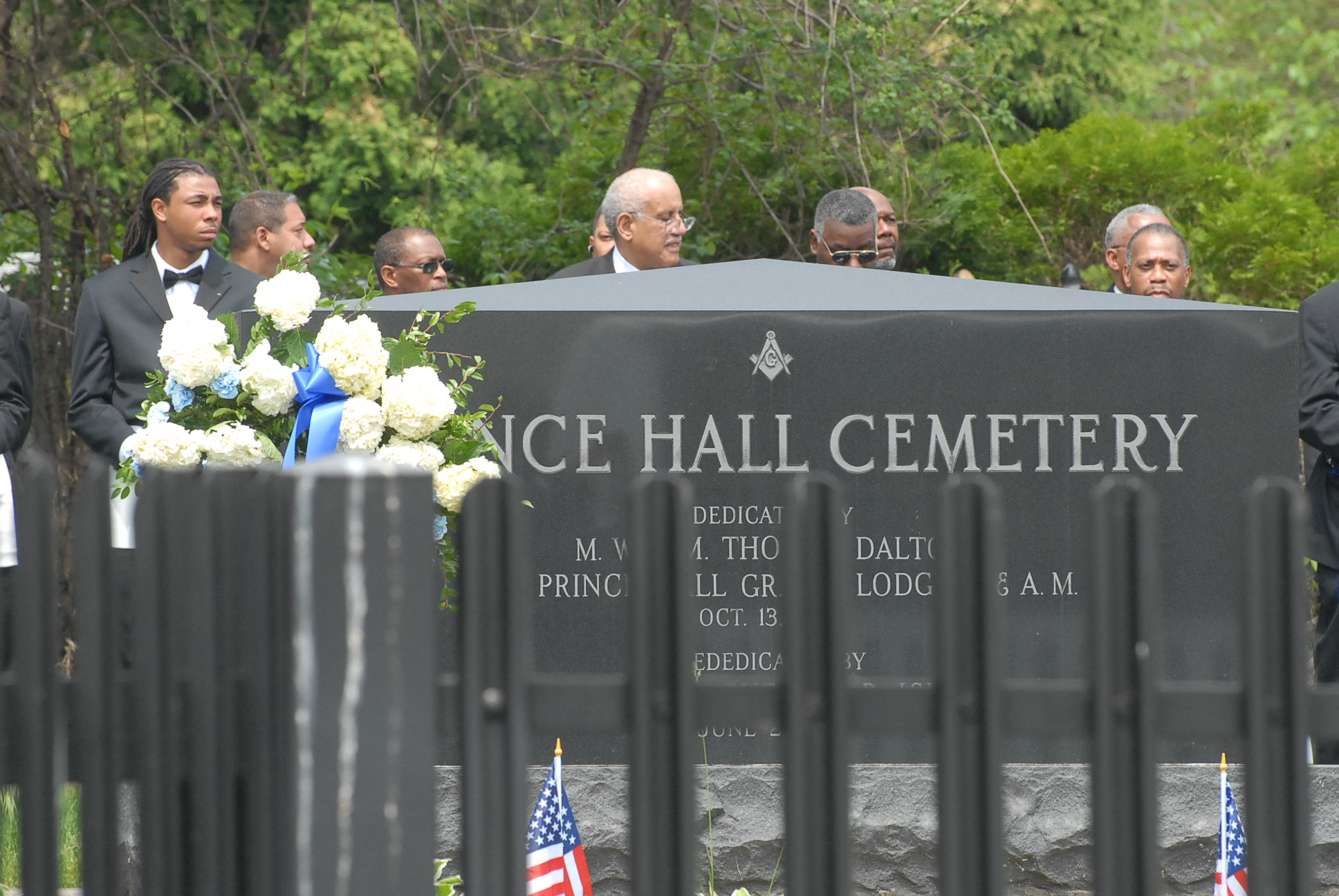
Memorial Day observance, 2011

Beginning in 1990, Masons from the Prince Hall Grand Lodge have held an annual ceremony on Memorial Day. This event features remarks by the Grand Matron and other Masonic representatives and has frequently included an address by the president of the Arlington Historical Society.

== See also ==
- National Register of Historic Places listings in Arlington, Massachusetts
