= Primus Hall =

Early African American educator and abolitionist

Primus Hall (February 29, 1756 – March 22, 1842) was born into slavery. He is believed to be the son of Prince Hall, an abolitionist, American Revolutionary War soldier and founder of the Prince Hall Freemasonry.

In 1798, he established a school for African American children in his home, and after the school was moved to the African Meeting House, he raised funds until 1835. Like his father, he was a recognized leader in the African American community.

Having been given to Ezra Trask as a baby, he was also known as Primus Trask, but within the Boston community known to be the son of Prince Hall.

== Early life ==
Hall was born into slavery on February 29, 1756, in Boston. Because recordkeeping of the era was incomplete, his parentage is uncertain, but a common belief is that his father was Prince Hall and his mother a woman named Deliah. At the time of Hall's birth, Prince Hall was possibly enslaved by William Hall; Prince Hall attained his freedom by 1770. (Note: Deliah's last name may have been Hall. Primus' mother's name was stated to be "Deliah Hall" in the Making Slavery History book.)

Hall was "bound out" to Ezra Trask, an Essex County shoemaker, as a baby or an infant. An arrangement was made to teach Primus to be a shoemaker, and at twenty-one, he was set to obtain his freedom. Instead, before that happened, due to diagnosed health issues, Hall was given his "freedom with full liberty for me to transact any of all business of every kind." Until 1776, he worked as a truckman and farmer in the Salem, Massachusetts, area.

== Revolutionary War ==
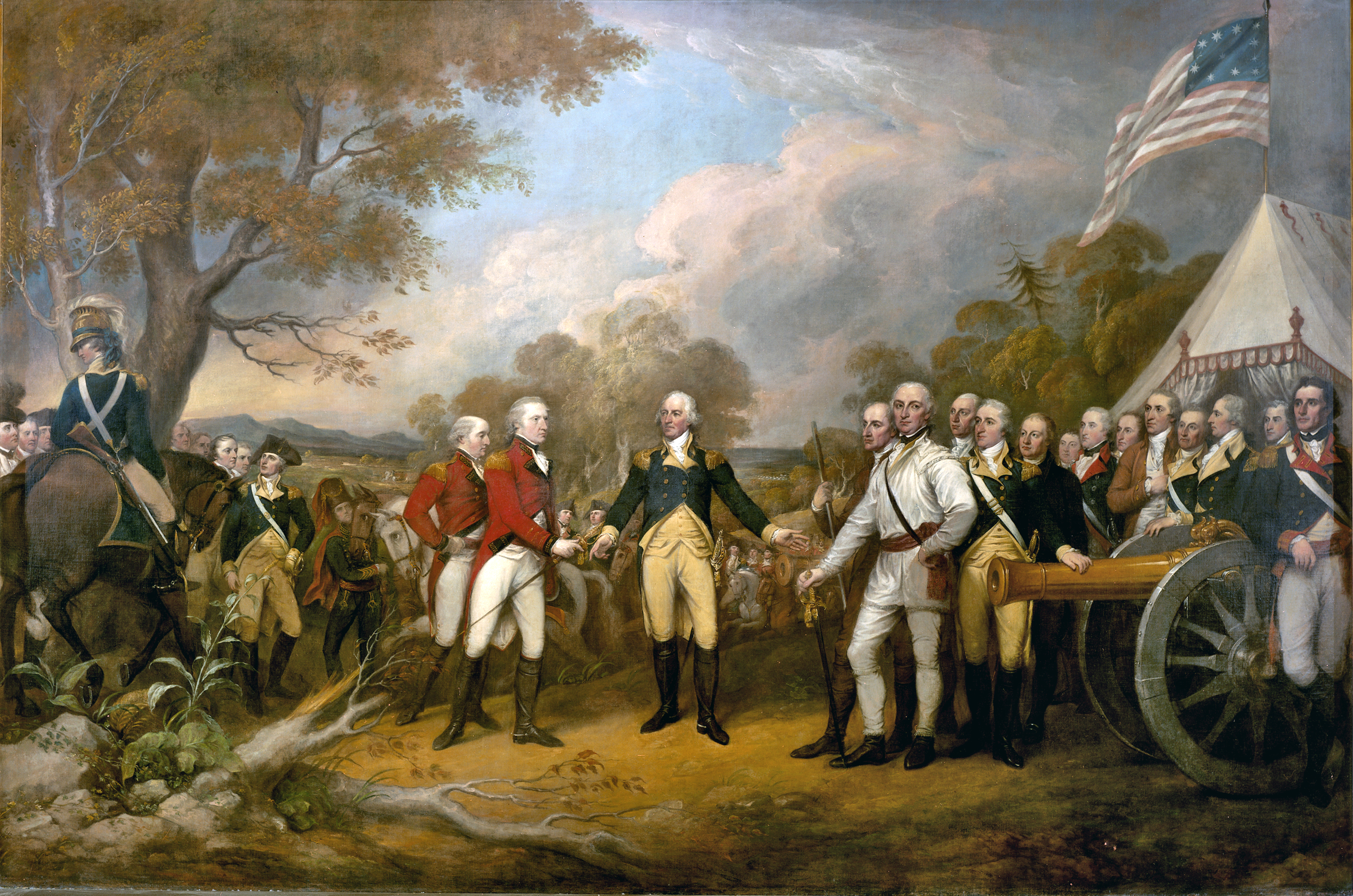
Surrender of General Burgoyne, October 17, 1777. Painted by John Trumbull, 1821.

He was a Revolutionary War soldier, having enlisted at the age of 19 in the 5th Massachusetts Regiment. His father encouraged enslaved and freed blacks to serve the American colonial military. He believed that if blacks were involved in founding the new nation, it would aid in attaining freedom for all blacks. Although the colonial army did not initially accept African American soldiers, after the British Army allowed black men to join the army in exchange for their freedom, the Continental Army relented. It is believed, but not certain, that Hall's father was one of the six "Prince Halls" from Massachusetts to serve during the war.

Hall first went with the 5th Massachusetts regiment to Winter Hill, Massachusetts. There, his company "waited out the Siege of Boston." In New York, the regiment fought in the White Plains and Harlem Heights battles. They also fought in Trenton and Princeton, New Jersey. After one year, Hall re-enlisted and fought in Battles of Saratoga, and was there for the Surrender of General Burgoyne.

== Steward to Timothy Pickering ==
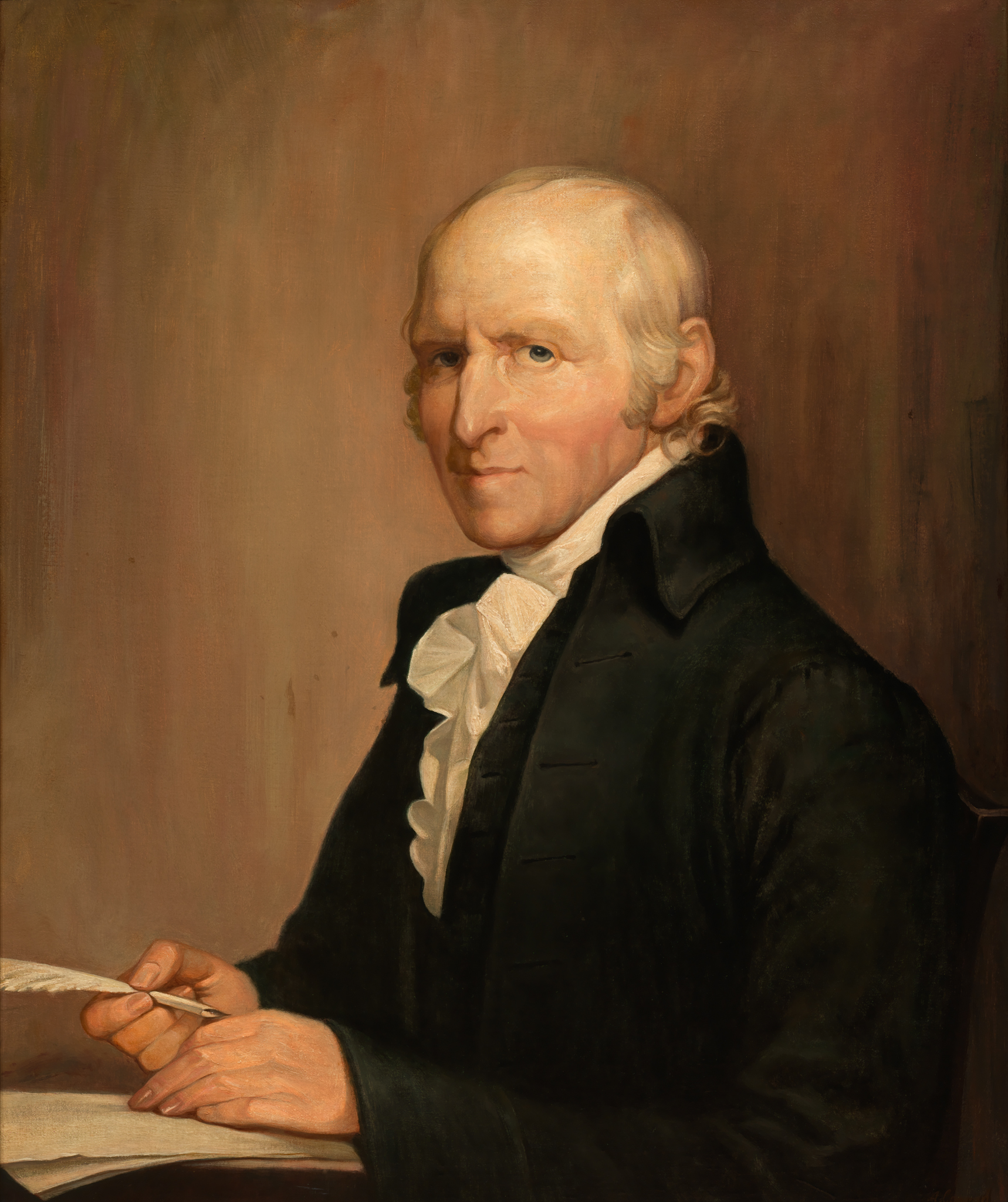
Timothy Pickering served in the Massachusetts militia and Continental Army during the Revolutionary War. He was a politician from Salem, Massachusetts, and the third United States Secretary of State under Presidents George Washington and John Adams.

After the war, Hall met Timothy Pickering, a Quartermaster General and politician. Hall offered to work for Pickering, who hired him as a steward. He wrote his wife, "I have luckily met with a likely negro fellow who has lived several years in Salem ... He desired to live with me as a Servant ... He said he would not have tendered me his service, but that I was a New England man, & he knew my character." and further that "he was so intelligent to be capable of learning anything." Pickering's wife lived in Newburgh, New York, and Pickering was posted in Philadelphia, Pennsylvania. Hall transported supplies and letters between the two locations during the summer of 1781.

Margot Minardi wrote of Hall's proactive offer to work for the Quartermaster General: "Hall's choice to work for Pickering might be best read as a carefully calculated step in this former bondman's upward mobility."

The Godey's Lady's Book published an account of Hall engaging with George Washington during a visit to Pickering. Minardi wrote:

[W]hile in camp, when Washington felt he needed exercises, Hall set up a sort of jump rope for him, fastening one end to a stake and holding the other taut at his own chest. This anecdote gave an amusing picture of the nation's founding father engaged in play 'with true boyish zest.' It revealed little about Primus Hall, other than he seemed to be at General Washington's beck and call.

During another visit, Washington and Pickering had completed their work late in the day. Hall stated that there was an extra blanket and straw for Washington. After Washington and Pickering had fallen asleep, Hall sat on a box, leaning his head into his hands to sleep. Washington awoke, realized that Hall had given him his bed provisions, and insisted that there was sufficient straw and blanket to cover them both. Hall stated that the general need not be concerned, but Washington insisted, and the two men shared the straw and blanket that Hall had given up.

== Boston ==
=== Family and work life ===
Hall was the father of seven children, having married more than once. He established himself, independently, as a soapboiler in Boston after working for Pickering. (Note: Daughter of Primus and Phebe, Glora Hall, died at Hingham, Massachusetts, on June 8, 1799. Phebe Ann Clark Hall was buried on June 1, 1821, in Boston; She died of whooping cough at 3 years of age. Sons of Primus died in the early 1820s. Peter Hall was buried in a Lew family grave site or cemetery in Boston on December 24, 1820. He was 14 months old and died of whooping cough. George P. Hall was buried on June 8, 1825. He died in Boston of scrofula at 4 years of age.)

On May 2, 1786, Primus Trask Hall was married to Phebe Robson by Stephen Lewis at the Christ Church, now commonly known as the Old North Church. They were identified as negros and were married by Rev. Stephen Lewis [who was the minister there at that time]. Phebe died on December 8, 1808 (or December 22, 1808) at 47 years of age of consumption or atrophy.

On January 17, 1810, Primus married Martha Gardner, according to Manifesto Church (Brattle Street Church) records. She died of typhoid fever on January 20, 1817, at 36 years of age.

Primus Hall was married to Anna Clark on October 29, 1817, by Joshua Huntington. Anna was born February 17, 1791, to Peter Clark, who died June 22, 1820.

Hall was an active member of his father's Prince Hall Freemasonry lodge. He was a property owner in Boston.

=== Education activism ===
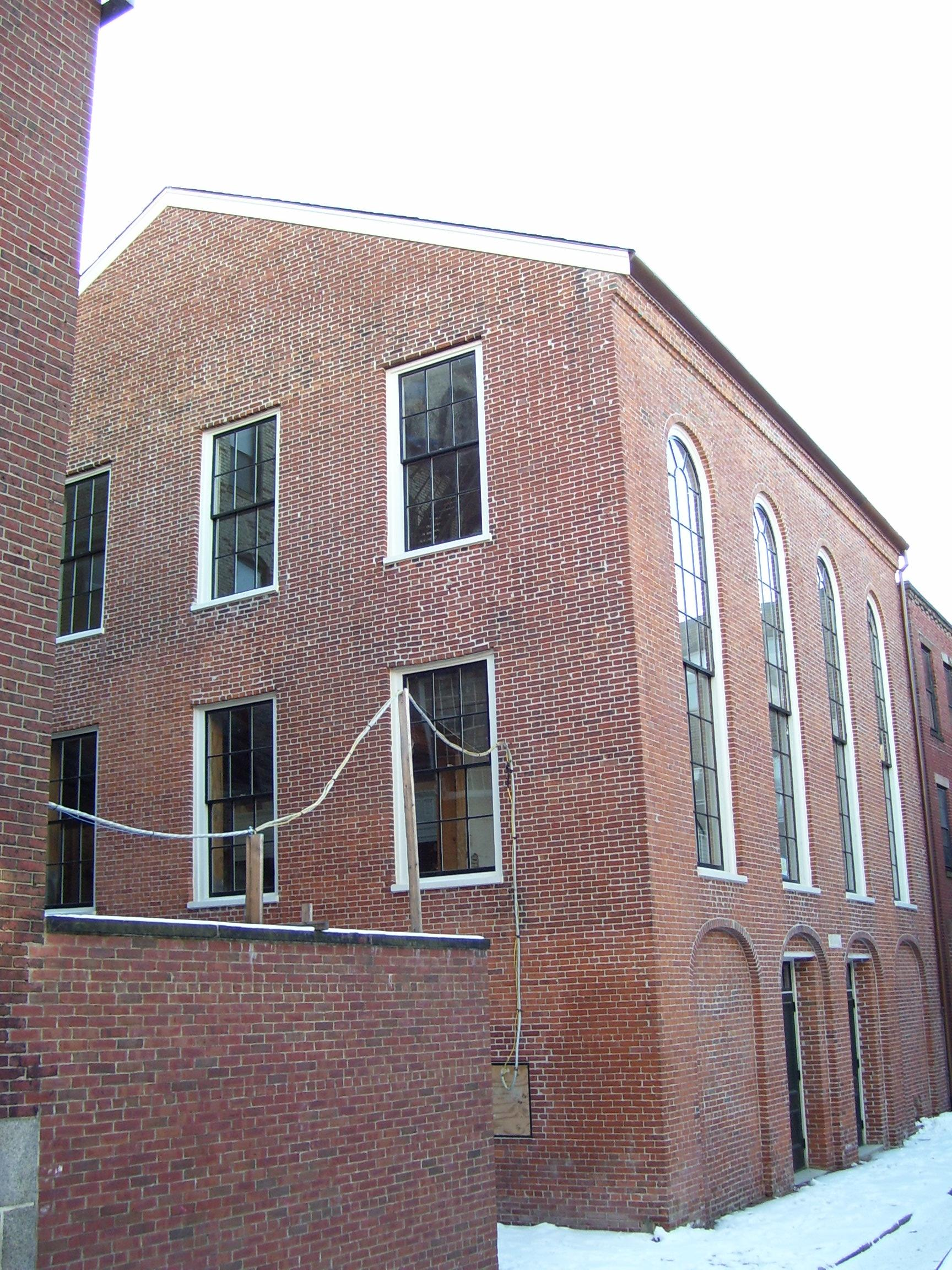
African Meeting House, built by Thomas Paul, where African American students obtained their education beginning in 1806.

Primus established a school in his home in 1798 to educate 60 African American children and sought funding from the community, including African American sailors. Elisha Sylvester was a teacher there. After Elisha, two Harvard University students taught the school. Unsuccessful in attempts to establish a public school with the city of Boston in 1800, the school was moved to the African Meeting House, the church built by Thomas Paul, an African American minister. Hall was one of the church's founders, and he continued fund-raising to support the African American school until 1835.

Besides inspiring Boston's African-Americans to pursue justice and quality in education, the school offered them opportunities for employment and economic growth, which in turn provided funds for future generations of African-American Bostonians to pursue higher education.

Hall advocated for better education for African American children, including access to college education.

=== Abolitionism ===
Primus Hall was active in signing and submitting petitions to the state legislature regarding slavery starting in 1788. He supported William Lloyd Garrison's abolitionist viewpoints by the 1830s.

== Boston Harbor fortification ==
Hall fortified Boston Harbor's Castle Island during the War of 1812.

== War pension benefit ==
=== Pension suit ===
In the 1830s, Hall filed a suit for a pension as a Revolutionary War soldier because he had been denied a pension by the pension commissioner. It was assumed that as a colored man, Hall had been a servant and had not participated in battles. In his petition, Hall gave an account of his engagement in New York and New Jersey battles, including when he followed two enemy soldiers for half a mile and took them prisoner. After his second enlistment period, "to the earnest request of George Washington he volunteered for the further term of six weeks." After his service in Princeton and Morristown was completed, George Washington signed his honorable discharge.

White men who had served with him provided testimony that Hall had served as any other soldier and that he had the respect of officers and other soldiers. The pension commissioner's decision was overruled, and Hall received a pension. His suit was filed under Prius Hall, alias Trask and was H.R. 318 of 1838. On June 28, 1828, he was approved to receive a pension of $60 (~$1,759 in 2025) per year.

=== Widow's benefits ===
Ann applied for benefits under the Widow's Pension Application file #W.751. Her husband was listed as Primus Trask Hall in the Continental Army, Massachusetts.

== Death and obituary ==
Hall died on March 22, 1842, in Boston. His obituary read that he "was well known, particularly to the younger portions of our citizens, to whom he was in the habit of recounting scenes of the Revolutionary War."
