= George W. Braxdell =

American politician (1839–1891)

- Born: July 4, 1839; Danville, Kentucky, U.S.
- Died: March 8, 1891 (aged 51); Talladega, Alabama, U.S.
- Known for: Alabama State Representative during Reconstruction and First Grand Master of the Grand Lodge of Alabama, Prince Hall

George W. Braxdell or Braxdall (July 4, 1839 – March 8, 1891) was a barber, judge, and Prince Hall Freemason who served in the Alabama state legislature during the Reconstruction era.

== Early life ==
Braxdell was born on July 4, 1839 in Danville, Kentucky. At an unknown date, Braxdall moved to Talladega, Alabama and worked as a barber.

== Career ==
Braxdell was heavily involved in his community and in politics. He became a justice of the peace in Talladega, Alabama on September 4, 1868. He was the first African-American law enforcement officer in Alabama. He served in the Alabama House of Representatives in 1870.

Braxdell was a Prince Hall Freemason, initiated in an unknown lodge in 1875 before later becoming a member of Mt. Moriah Lodge, No. 12. When two independent Grand Lodge of Alabama merged in 1878, Braxdall became the First Grand Master, serving eight terms from 1878 to 1886.

== Later life ==
Braxdell died on March 8, 1891 at the age of 51 and was buried in Oak Hill Cemetery in Talladega, Alabama.

== Legacy ==
George W. Braxdall Lodge, No. 28, in Decatur, Alabama, was named after him when the lodge was established in 1903. The Lodge Hall was placed on the Alabama's Places in Peril by the Alabama Trust for Historic Preservation.

He was elected to the Prince Hall Grand Lodge of Alabama Hall of Fame in 2015.

== See also ==
- African American officeholders from the end of the Civil War until before 1900
