= Grand Lodge of Virginia =

Masonic lodge in the United States

The Most Worshipful Grand Lodge, A.F. & A.M. of the Commonwealth of Virginia, commonly known as "Grand Lodge of Virginia", is the oldest, continuous, independent masonic grand lodge in the United States with 25,000 members in over 276 lodges. Both the Grand Lodge of Pennsylvania and the Grand Lodge of Massachusetts dispute this claim, each claiming to be the oldest Grand Lodge in the United States. A Pennsylvania Grand Lodge was probably working as early as 1727, or slightly before the one that was next formed in Massachusetts, circa-1730. However, both of those older grand lodges did not last, and both bodies had to be re-formed later in the eighteenth-century. The Grand Lodge of Virginia was constituted on 30 October 1778, with its first headquarters in Williamsburg, Virginia. The grand lodge relocated its offices to Richmond, Virginia, in 1784, where it remains to this day.

== History ==
The plans for its creation took root in a convention held on May 6, 1777. The grand lodge was formally constituted on October 30, 1778, with its first headquarters in Williamsburg, Virginia by the union of eight chartered lodges: Norfolk, at Norfolk; Port Royal in Caroline County; Blandford at Petersburg; Fredericksburg at Fredericksburg; Saint Tammany at Hampton; Williamsburg at Williamsburg; Botetourt at Gloucester Courthouse; Cabin Point in Prince George County. Four other Virginia lodges that were also in existence during the colonial era, but chose not to participate at all in this Virginia formative effort, were: York at Yorktown; Alexandria at Alexandria; Winchester Hiram at Winchester; and Hobbes Hole at Tappahannock. (NOTE: There also was at least one French-speaking lodge that was variously working in the Norfolk-Portsmouth area, but it was not recognized by any of the other Virginia lodges that had all been originally chartered via the English (Premier), Scottish, or Pennsylvania Grand Lodges.)

George Washington was invited to be the first Grand Master, but was unable to accept the honor due to his military duties in the war for American independence, and because he had never been installed as the Master or Warden of a lodge, he did not consider it masonically legal to serve as Grand Master.

In 1865 the Grand Lodge of West Virginia was formed taking a number of Lodges that had been part of the Grand Lodge of Virginia but that were now part of the state of West Virginia that had seceded from Virginia in 1863, during the middle of the American Civil War. The Grand Lodge of West Virginia was founded in Fairmont in April 1865 with William Bates as its first Grand Master. Over the following period there was confusion as many West Virginia lodges still maintained loyalty to the Grand Lodge of Virginia although all the West Virginia Lodges that were originally chartered by Virginia were re-chartered by the Grand Lodge of West Virginia within the next fifty years. While all of those lodges eventually received West Virginia charters, they petitioned the Grand Lodge of Virginia to keep their VA charters, which was eventually granted.

== See also ==
- List of notable Masonic buildings in Virginia
