= George Middleton (activist) =

American veteran, Prince Hall Freemason and community civil rights campaigner

George Middleton (c. 1735 – April 6, 1815) was an African-American Revolutionary War veteran, a Prince Hall Freemason, and a community civil rights campaigner in Massachusetts.

== War service ==
Middleton was one of 5,000 African Americans to serve in the military on the Patriot side of the Revolutionary War, although scant evidence survives about his military service. Colonel Middleton served as commander of the Bucks of America, a Boston-based unit of the Massachusetts militia. Few details have survived about the Bucks, one of only two all-black Patriot units in the war. After the war, Governor John Hancock honored Colonel Middleton and his company by presenting him with a flag to commemorate their service. The flag still exists and is owned by the Massachusetts Historical Society.

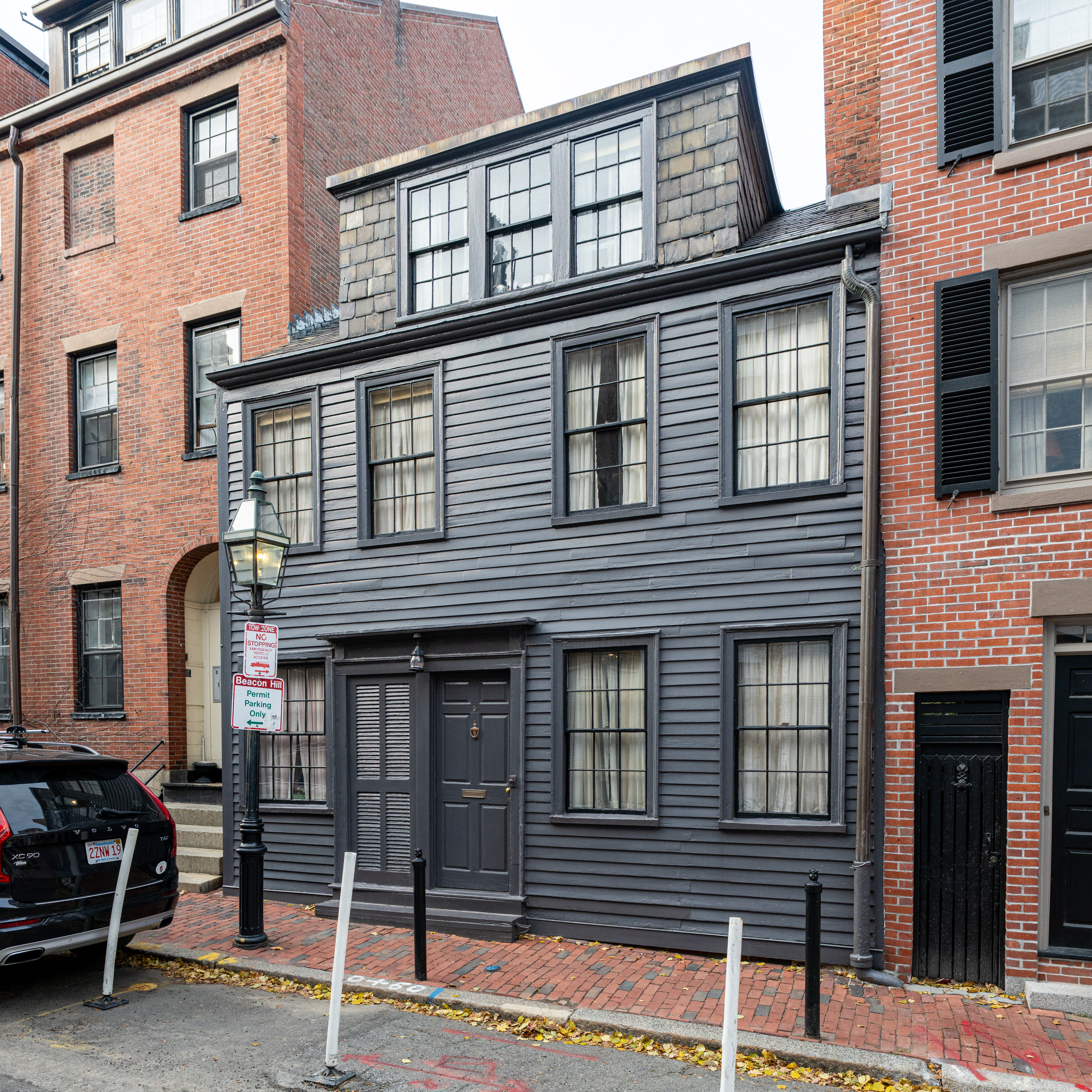
Middleton house, built in 1797; Pinckney St., Boston (2025)

== Post-war ==
After the American Revolution, African Americans began to form their own small community in a town called the North Slope of Beacon Hill in Boston, Massachusetts - Middleton being one of the first. Middleton bought land on Pinckney Street and with a friend built a home.

Middleton was a violinist, a horse breaker, and coachman. He gained considerable recognition for his accomplishments and was a constant advocate for the rights of African Americans.

To that end he organized the African Benevolent Society in 1796, an organization that provided financial relief and job placement for members - primarily widows and orphans. In 1808 he published an anti-slavery statement along with his Masonic brother Prince Hall stating, "Freedom is desirable, if not, would men sacrifice their time, their property and finally their lives in the pursuit of this?" With this powerful statement parallels between American Revolution and the desires for black Americans grew.

Middleton was recognized for his activism and prominence in the community, and was appointed Grand Master of the African Masonic Lodge in 1809. He had married in 1781, but apparently left no children when he died in 1815.

Middleton's former home at 5 Pinckney Street is on the Boston Black Heritage Trail.
