= Grand Lodge of West Virginia =

Freemasonry Grand Lodge in the US

The Grand Lodge of West Virginia is a freemason organization in West Virginia. It had maintained the West Virginia Masonic Home from 1921 until its closure in 2016.

== History ==
Before the American Civil War, West Virginia had been a part of Virginia, and its Lodges were therefore under the auspicies of the Grand Lodge of Virginia. The area that became West Virginia seceded from the Confederacy and maintenance of fraternal relations between lodges of the two states became impossible. A convention to create a new lodge took place in 1864, and then on April 12, 1865, the day when the Army of Northern Virginia was formally surrendered by ceremony at Appomattox Court House, the Grand Lodge of West Virginia was founded in Fairmont, West Virginia. William Bates was its first Grand Master. Over the following decades, there was confusion as many West Virginia lodges still maintained loyalty to the Grand Lodge of Virginia although all the Lodges that were originally chartered by Virginia were re-chartered by the Grand Lodge of West Virginia within the next fifty years.

=== Haas lawsuit ===
In 2008, Frank Joseph Haas, Grand Master of the Grand Lodge during 2005–2006 and a lawyer and administrative law judge himself, sued the Grand Lodge when it later expelled him in 2007.

In 2006, Haas tried to bring about reforms of the Grand Lodge which would do away with discriminatory practices. This included allowing men of varying races, age groups, and physical abilities into West Virginia Masonic lodges and allowing lodges in West Virginia to support non-Masonic charities. The changes would also permit Prince Hall Masons (predominantly African-American) from other recognized jurisdictions to visit West Virginia lodges.

In the meeting at which his term of office expired, Haas claims the reforms were passed by a close vote. The reform proposals were immediately ruled invalid by Charles Coleman, one of two Grand Masters who succeeded him. In November 2007, Haas was expelled by the other Grand Master, Charlie Montgomery. In May 2008 Haas sued the Grand Lodge and the two successors over the expulsion, saying it was without due process, and seeking readmission and damages. The lawsuit was notable for offering "a glimpse into the world of the Masons", a society that "is not exactly secretive, [but] has often been veiled in mystery, as some of its customs and practices are not revealed to non-members." Unusual pre-trial motions sought to ban discussion of Masonic rituals and comparisons to Hitler, and a subpoenaed witness was granted a protective order in which Masons are "enjoined and restrained from taking any punitive measures ... as a result of his giving a deposition."

One characterization of the result is that a judge ruled that the Grand Lodge had violated its own internal rules, but there was no legal penalty to be applied against the Lodge, and the jury awarded no damages for the breach of contract. More strongly, the defending lawyer stated the jury "found in the defendants' favor on all counts". A reporter summarized that the case "sends a message that [private] organizations have much leeway in how they manage their affairs, make their rules and deal with membership issues."

Haas was later admitted in to a Lodge in Ohio, which caused the Grand Lodge of West Virginia to withdraw its recognition of the Grand Lodge of Ohio. In 2013, Haas was reportedly expelled from the Ohio jurisdiction and GLWV again recognized the Grand Lodge of Ohio.

== Famous West Virginia Freemasons ==
- George W. Atkinson (June 29, 1845 – April 4, 1925) tenth governor of West Virginia, during 1897–1901. Raised in Kanawha Lodge No. 20, Charleston, West Virginia, October 12, 1866. Grand master of West Virginia in 1876 and Grand Secretary of the Grand Lodge of West Virginia from 1897 to 1901.
- Frank Llewellyn Bowman (January 21, 1879 – September 15, 1936), United States Representative from West Virginia during 1925–1933.
- Frank Buckles, Last living American veteran of World War I.
- Nick Rahall (1949–), former US representative from West Virginia (1977–2015).
- Cecil H. Underwood (November 5, 1922 – November 24, 2008), 25th and 32nd governor of West Virginia (1957–1961, 1997–2001). Both the youngest and the oldest person ever to serve as Governor of West Virginia. He was also the first guest on the television game show To Tell the Truth. Raised in Phoenix Lodge No. 73, Sistersville, West Virginia in May 1955.
- Robert Byrd (1917 – 2010), U.S. Senator from West Virginia and former Senate Majority Whip

Association of the Grand Lodge with West Virginia state government continues, for example with then-Governor Gaston Caperton attending "West Virginia Masonic Heritage Day Celebration" in Charleston on August 21, 1993, to accept a "resolution honoring the memory of our Brother and former Governor, George Wesley Atkinson."
