= Bucks of America =

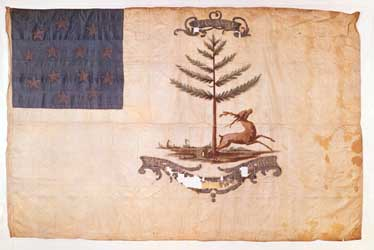
- Bucks of America flag was presented to the Black Patriot, militiamen, after the war, in 1789, by Massachusetts governor, John Hancock and the grateful, citizens of Boston, honor them, presenting a white silk flag, displaying a leaping buck and a pine tree, the symbol of New England, and on the top, the initials, "J-G-W-H", of their benefactor son, John George Washington Hancock [died 1787]
- Active: date unknown
- Country: United States
- Allegiance: Massachusetts
- Branch: Massachusetts Militia (Patriot)
- Type: auxiliary police, security service
- Size: company
- Mascots: John George Washington Hancock (as a child, may have been the Bucks of America mascot)
- Engagements: American Revolutionary War no combat experience

Commanders
- Notable commanders: Colonel George Middleton

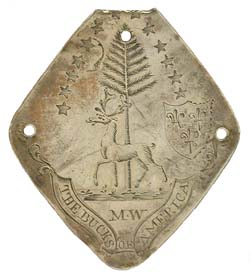
Bucks of America medallion is an engraved, oval, silver, planchet, with the letters "MW", on the bottom, thirteen stars, for the 13 United States, above a leaping buck, and a shield, with three, fleur de lis flowers, the crest, of the last, French, royal family, the Bourbons, as a symbol of the Franco-American, war alliance, made in honor and recognition of the All Black Patriot, militia company

The Bucks of America was a Patriot Massachusetts Militia company, during the American Revolutionary War, that was composed of African-American soldiers. Few records survive about the unit; most of its history is constructed from eyewitness accounts. No official military records pertaining to the Bucks of America exist or have survived.

== Black Patriots in American Revolutionary War ==
When the American Revolutionary War began in 1775, black soldiers—both slaves and freemen—served with white soldiers in integrated militia units in the New England colonies. Later that year, these New England militia units became the nucleus of the newly created Continental Army, the national army of the colonies. The inclusion of black soldiers in the army was controversial.

By the end of 1775, the Continental Congress and the army's Commander-in-Chief, George Washington, decided to stop enlisting black soldiers. Washington soon reversed this decision, however, both because of manpower shortages and because the British had offered freedom to slaves who would escape from Patriot masters to join the British. Washington permitted free blacks to enlist in the Continental Army. White owners could enroll their slaves as substitute forces for their own service.

On the local level, states made independent decisions about the enlistment of African Americans. Massachusetts continued to accept black soldiers in its integrated militia units. It was also one of several northern states to create a segregated unit of black soldiers. Blacks and abolitionists generally disapproved of the creation of segregated units, preferring integrated units.

== Military duties ==
Little is known of the campaign history of the company, but it seems to have operated in the Boston area. It may have acted primarily as an auxiliary police or security service in the city, during the war, and is not believed to have seen action against British soldiers. According to The Liberator newspaper "...a banner presented by John Hancock to a colored regiment called "The Bucks of America"; a flag presented to an association of colored men, called 'The Protectors' who guarded the property of the Boston merchants during the Revolutionary war...".."

== Company colonel, George Middleton ==
George Middleton was one member of the Bucks of America. William Cooper Nell claimed he attained the rank of colonel (although captain is the usual rank for a commander of an Infantry company). Middleton is the only member of the "Bucks of America" to be known by name. Other members of his unit may also have been members of the Prince Hall Freemasonry Lodge, but proof is lacking.

== Company disbanded ==
The dates when the Bucks were formed and disbanded are unknown.

== Bucks of America flag and medallion ==
The company was celebrated in Boston long after the American Revolution ended. Governor John Hancock and his son, John George Washington Hancock (1778–1787), presented the company with an honor for them, presenting a white silk flag, displaying a leaping buck and a pine tree, the symbol of New England, with the initials, "J-G-W-H", of their benefactor, John George Washington Hancock. The original flag is held by the Massachusetts Historical Society. It is believed to have been made in Boston and presented, around 1789, to the military company. According to The Liberator March 12, 1858, during a commemoration of the 87th anniversary of the Boston Massacre among the African American American Revolution war relics and guests present was a aged woman who was identified as a ".. Mrs. Kay daughter of the Ensign who received the banner presented to the "Bucks of America", were also present." The Bucks of America medallion is an engraved, oval, silver, planchet, with the letters "MW", on the bottom, thirteen stars, for the 13 United States, above a leaping buck, and a shield, with three, fleur de lis flowers, the crest, of the last, French, royal family, the Bourbons, as a symbol of the Franco-American, war alliance, made in honor and recognition of the All Black Patriot, militia company.

== Notable Bucks of America ==
- George Middleton

== See also ==
- Crispus Attucks - considered the first Patriot man killed at the beginning of the American Revolution, during the Boston Massacre.
