= Harry Albro Williamson =

American Freemason (1875–1965)

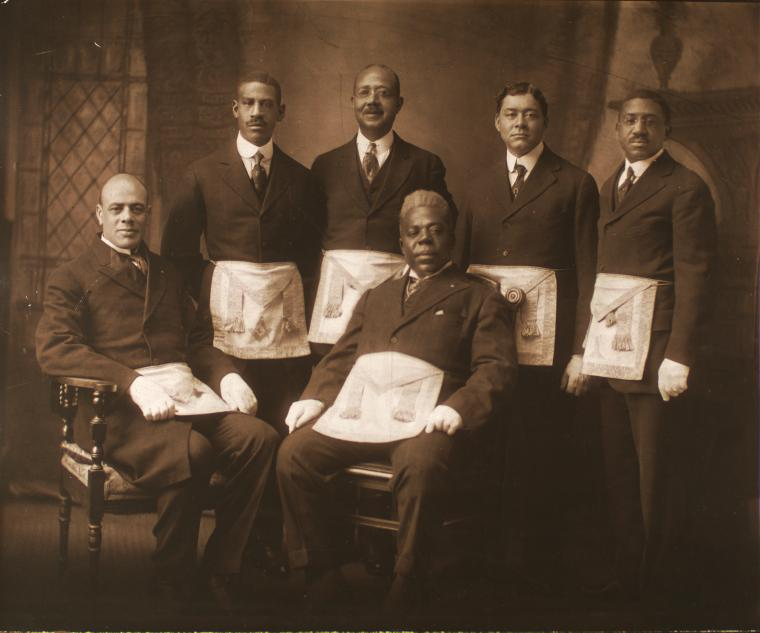
- Harry A. Williamson (standing, far right) and five fellow members of the Carthaginian Lodge no. 47
- Born: October 25, 1875; Plainfield, New Jersey
- Died: January 3, 1965 (aged 89)
- Occupation: Postal worker

Henry 'Harry' Albro Williamson (October 25, 1875 - January 3, 1965) was a postal worker and a prolific researcher and writer on the subject of Freemasonry.

== Freemasonry ==
Williamson joined the brotherhood of Freemasonry in 1904 and did extensive research documenting the progress of black Freemasonry in order to determine its origins and authenticity His research has been used by modern-day Masons in order to decry "bogus" Freemasonry. Williamson was a member of the Grand Lodge of New York (Prince Hall) where he served as deputy Grandmaster, Grand Lecturer and Grand Historian. He organized the first Lodge of Research in Prince Hall Freemasonry, becoming its first and only Master in 1943. He filled the role of Grand Secretary for over thirty years. His papers, consisting of over 1200, items including his Prince Hall Masonic collection were given to the Schomburg Center at New York Public Library in February 1936.

== Personal life ==
Williamson's parents were William Edward Williamson and Mary Elizabeth Pauline Williamson. He was born in New Jersey but moved to Oakland California in 1880 when his father died. His papers are held in the New York Public Library Archives. Williamson married Laura Julia Moulton, in 1901. They later divorced. He married Blanche C. Atkins in 1920.

== Works and publications ==
- Origin of freemasonry among Negroes in America (1914)
- Negroes and Freemasonry (1920)
- The Negro in Masonic Literature (1922)
- The Prince Hall Primer (1925)
- A Chronological History of Prince Hall Masonry, 1784-1932 (1934)
- The Order of the Eastern Star (1938)
- The Story of Carthaginian Lodge, No. 47, F. & A.M., 1904-1949 (1949)
