= Prince Hall Freemasonry =

Branch of Freemasonry fraternal organization

- Founded: September 29, 1784; 242 years ago Boston, Massachusetts, US
- Type: Fraternal order
- Affiliation: Independent
- Status: Active
- Emphasis: African Americans
- Scope: International
- Chapters: 4,500+
- Members: 300,000+ lifetime
- Headquarters: United States

Prince Hall Freemasonry is a branch of North American Freemasonry created for African Americans, founded by Prince Hall on September 29, 1784. Prince Hall Freemasonry is the oldest and largest (300,000+ initiated members) predominantly African-American fraternity in the United States.

Different organizations purport to be of Prince Hall Freemasonry: one group is the independent, 'Prince Hall Affiliated' or 'PHA' Grand Lodges, most of which are recognized by their state Grand Lodge counterparts and the United Grand Lodge of England, being considered 'regular' in Freemasonry. Others are under the jurisdiction of a 'National Grand Lodge', 'Prince Hall Origin', or otherwise non-Prince Hall Affiliated Lodges or Grand Lodges.

== History ==
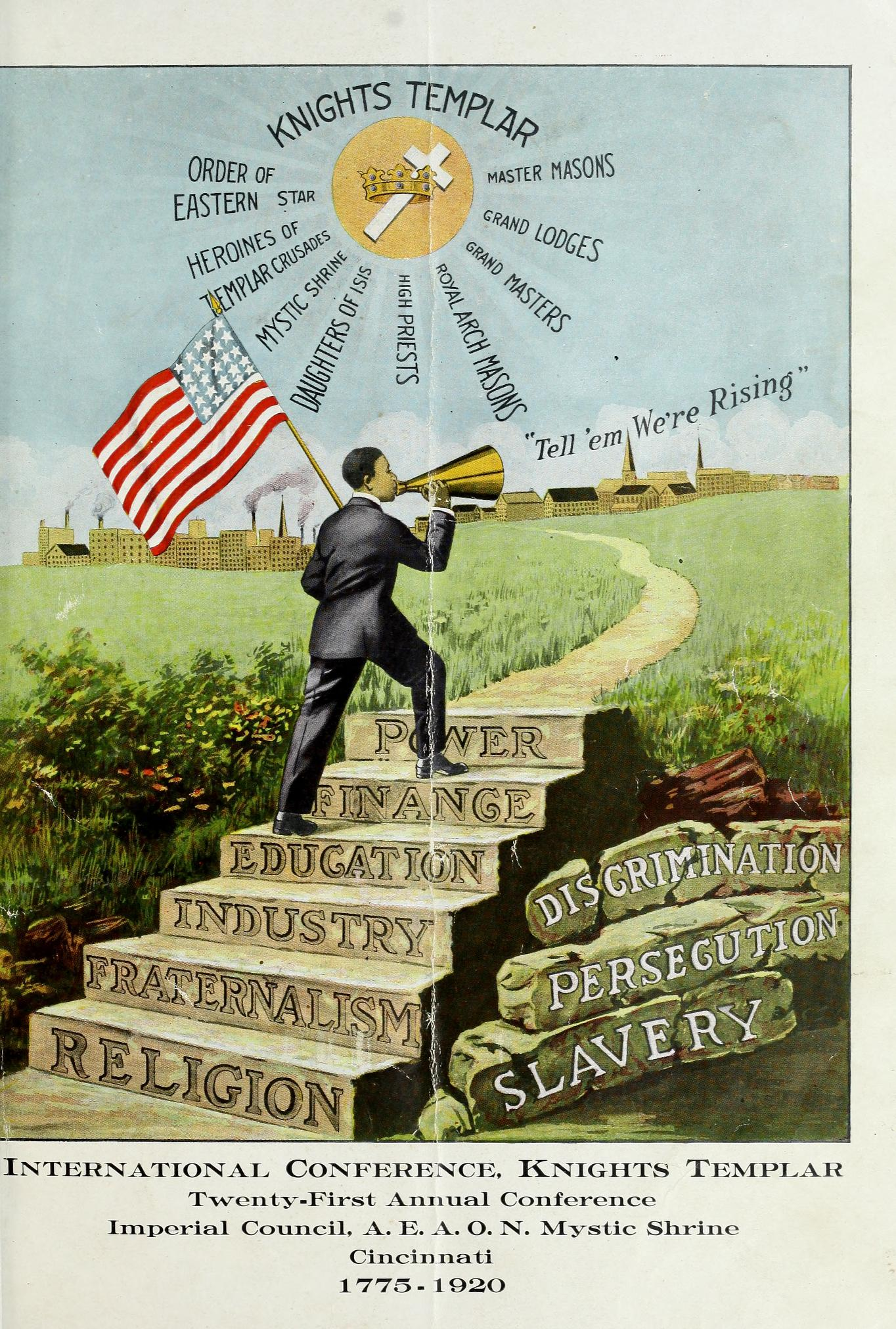
An illustration from a Prince Hall Masonic convention in 1920

=== Petitions for admittance into existing lodges ===
Before the American Revolutionary War, Prince Hall and fourteen other free black men petitioned for admission to the white Boston St. John's Lodge. They were declined. The Masonic fraternity was attractive to some free blacks such as Prince Hall because freemasonry was founded upon ideals of liberty, equality, and peace.

=== Grand Lodge of Ireland ===
Having been rejected by colonial American Freemasonry, Hall and 14 other men sought and were initiated into Masonry through Lodge No. 441 of the Grand Lodge of Ireland on March 6, 1775. This military lodge was attached to the 38th Foot (renamed "The 1st Staffordshire Regiment") in 1782. The Lodge was attached to British forces stationed in Boston during the colonial period.

Hall and other free black men founded African Lodge No. 1 and he was elected Master. Other African Americans included Cyrus Johnston, Bueston Slinger, Prince Rees, John Canton, Peter Freeman, Benjamin Tiler, Duff Ruform, Thomas Santerson, Prince Rayden, Cato Speain, Boston Smith, Peter Best, Forten Horward, and Richard Titley, all of whom were free by birth.

After the United States gained independence, when men wished to become Masons in the new nation the existing members of the Lodge had to vote unanimously to accept the petitioner. That person would be rejected if any white member voted against a black petitioner. Discrimination against African Americans persisted for decades.

Masonic and Grand Lodges generally excluded African Americans. Since the votes were anonymous, it was impossible to identify the member who had voted against accepting a black member. The effect was that black men who had legitimately been made Masons in integrated jurisdictions could be rejected in a new area.

=== Premier Grand Lodge of England ===
The African Americans applied to the Premier Grand Lodge of England, and their Grand Master, H. R. H. The Duke of Cumberland, issued a charter for African Lodge No. 459 September 29, 1784, later renamed African Lodge No. 1. The lodge was the country's first African Masonic lodge.

On March 22, 1797, Prince Hall organized a lodge in Philadelphia, called African Lodge #459, under Prince Hall's Charter. They later received their charter. On June 25, 1797, he organized African Lodge (later known as Hiram Lodge #3) at Providence, Rhode Island.

Author and historian James Sidbury stated:

Prince Hall and those who joined him to found Boston's African Masonic Lodge built a fundamentally new "African" movement on a preexisting institutional foundation. Within that movement, they asserted emotional, mythical, and genealogical links to the continent of Africa and its peoples.

In 1788 John Marrant became the chaplain of the African Masonic Lodge.

The lodge met in the "Golden Fleece," located near Boston Harbor, during the 1780s and 1790s. They later met at Kirby Street Temple in Boston.

=== Intervisitation attainment ===
By 1797 there were at least 34 members in the Boston black lodge, but still the lodge was overlooked by white Boston Masons. Integration with the American white Masons was not imminent. Since they were unable to attain integration, the blacks concentrated on recognition from white Masons that, because black Masonry descending from Prince Hall of Massachusetts had received its charter from the English Grand Lodge, it was legitimate and not "clandestine," and was entitled to all Masonic rights, such as intervisitation between black and white lodges, without prejudice. Many Grand Masters hoped that ultimately recognition would lead to integration, but they knew it would be a long time before that happened.

=== African Grand Lodge ===
After the death of Prince Hall, on December 4, 1807, the brethren were eager to form a Grand Lodge. On June 24, 1808, they organized the African Grand Lodge with lodges from Philadelphia, Providence, and Boston. The latter was later renamed the Prince Hall Grand Lodge, in his honor.

The Lodge was struck from the rolls after the 1813 merger of the Antients and the Moderns (two rival Grand Lodges of England), along with many other Lodges. African Lodge (and many others) was omitted from the register, due to the lack of recent contact, but it was not formally erased.

=== Independent lodge ===
After being denied acknowledgment by the Grand Lodge of Massachusetts, the African Lodge declared itself to be an independent Grand Lodge, the African Grand Lodge of Massachusetts.

In 1827 the African Grand Lodge declared its independence from the United Grand Lodge of England, as the Grand Lodge of Massachusetts had done 45 years earlier. It also stated its independence from all of the white Grand Lodges in the United States, declaring itself to be a separate Masonic body.

This led to a tradition of separate, predominantly African-American jurisdictions in North America, known collectively as Prince Hall Freemasonry. Widespread racial segregation in North America made it impossible for African Americans to join many predominantly white lodges. Most predominantly white Grand Lodges in North America refused to recognize the Prince Hall Lodges and Prince Hall Masons in their territory as legitimate. In the period after the Civil War, former Confederate general Albert Pike wrote to his brother in 1875, "I am not inclined to mettle in the matter. I took my obligations to white men, not to Negroes. When I have to accept Negroes as brothers or leave Masonry, I shall leave it."

After some successes in the civil rights movement in the United States in the 1960s, beginning in the late 1900s, predominantly white Grand Lodges of the United States began to recognize the legitimacy of their Prince Hall counterparts who were meeting in the same states. Even this change was met with considerable resistance by membership, especially in Southern states and among members of rural Lodges. A few states still lack such recognition.

"Recognition" does not mean full integration, but it does mean that members of the two kinds of Masonry can visit each other's Lodges and engage in Masonic discourse freely. This is considered a step forward but full integration is still considered unlikely. Today, Prince Hall Affiliated Grand Lodges are recognized by the United Grand Lodge of England (UGLE), as well as the overwhelming majority of US state Grand Lodges, and even many international Grand Lodges. The situation is complicated by the level of recognition that is granted. Some lodges give full "blanket" recognition to all Prince Hall Grand Lodges, while others put limits on issues such as "intervisitation rights" or dual membership, sometimes treating Prince Hall Grand Lodges as regular but foreign jurisdictions.

== Organization ==
There are two competing sets of organizations within Prince Hall Freemasonry. A minority of lodges, which are subject to the Prince Hall National Grand Lodge, are referred to as Prince Hall Origin (PHO) and traces its lineage to African Lodge #459.

The majority of lodges, which are subject to 41 independent state grand lodges, are known as Prince Hall Affiliation (PHA). They are regular and, except for a few, are recognized by their Grand Lodge of State counterparts and The United Grand Lodge of England.

The Conference of Prince Hall Grand Masters determines the regularity of Prince Hall Freemasonry known as Prince Hall Affiliation (PHA). All regular and recognized Prince Hall Grand Lodges Prince Hall Affiliation (PHA) are represented at the Conference. A comprehensive list of all Prince Hall grand lodges deemed regular is listed on the conference website. Each regular Grand Lodge also traces its lineage back to African Lodge #459, where Prince Hall was made a Mason. The group using the name Prince Hall Origin has no affiliation to the conference of Prince Hall Grand Masters.

== Lodges ==
Today, predominantly black Prince Hall Grand Lodges exist in the original state jurisdictions of the United States; additionally, Prince Hall jurisdictions have been established in Canada, the Caribbean, Liberia, and Brazil, governing Prince Hall Lodges throughout the world.

The Prince Hall Grand Lodge of the Caribbean was founded with the assistance of the Prince Hall Grand Lodge of New York. It is based in Christ Church, Barbados, the location of Prince Hall's birth. A monument to Prince Hall has been erected outside the Grand Lodge building.

Caribbean Prince Hall Masonry was established in Barbados with the chartering of Prince Hall Memorial Lodge #100 in July 1965 by the Grand Master and officers of the Prince Hall Grand Lodge of the State of New York and Jurisdiction. The same jurisdiction subsequently chartered additional lodges in Guyana, St. Maarten, St. Lucia, Barbados, and Dominica, constituting them into a District administration known as the New York 9th District (Caribbean).

In June 1975, senior members met at the New York Sheraton Hotel to commence discussion of the possible formation of an independent Caribbean Grand Lodge. Following many years of discussion, the Prince Hall Grand Lodge of the Caribbean and Jurisdiction was finally inaugurated on 24 April 1993. The Grand Lodge Prince Hall São Paulo, Brazil, was chartered by the Prince Hall National Grand Lodge in August 2022.

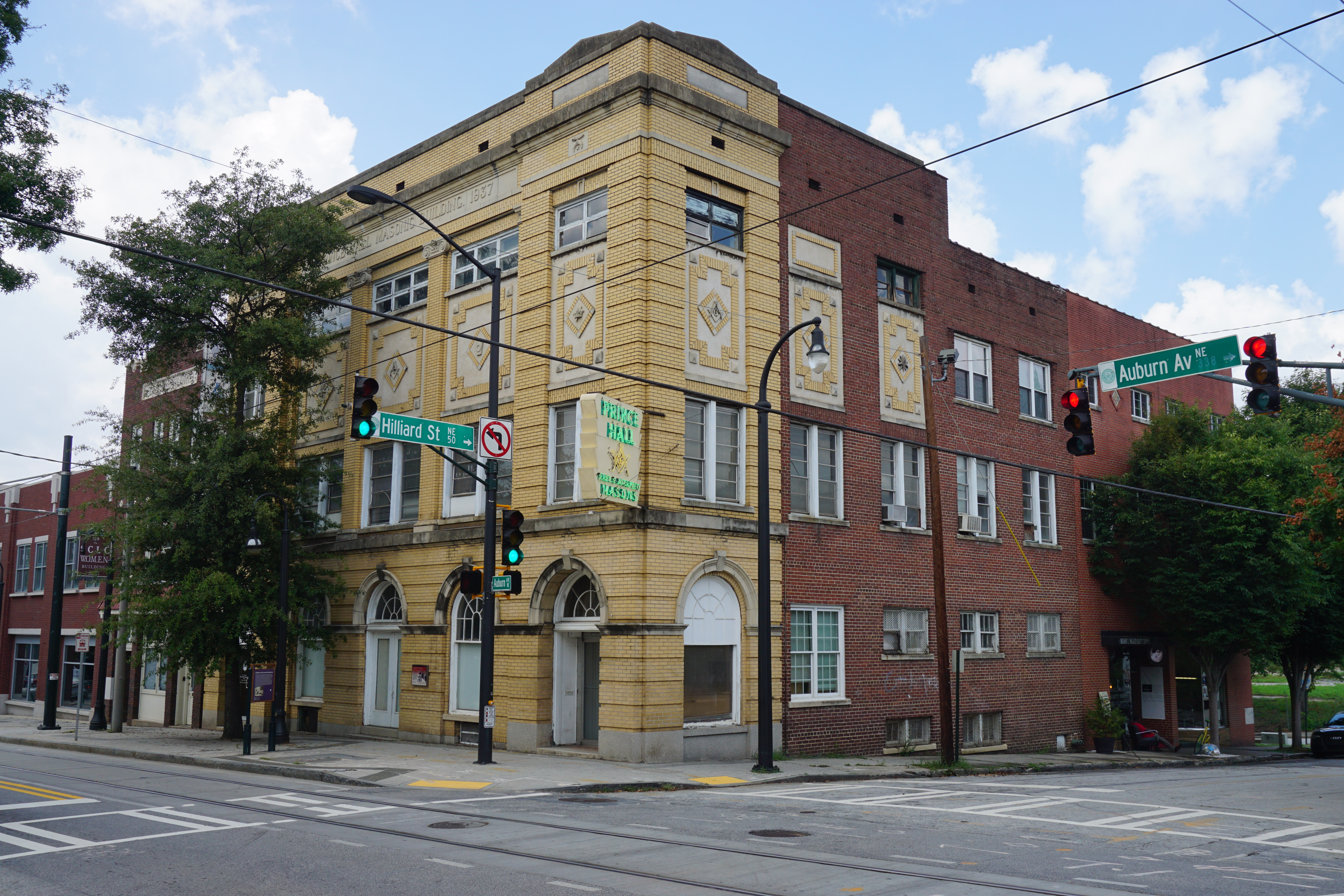
Martin Luther King Jr. National Historical Park, Atlanta, GA: Prince Hall Masonic Temple (Atlanta, Georgia)

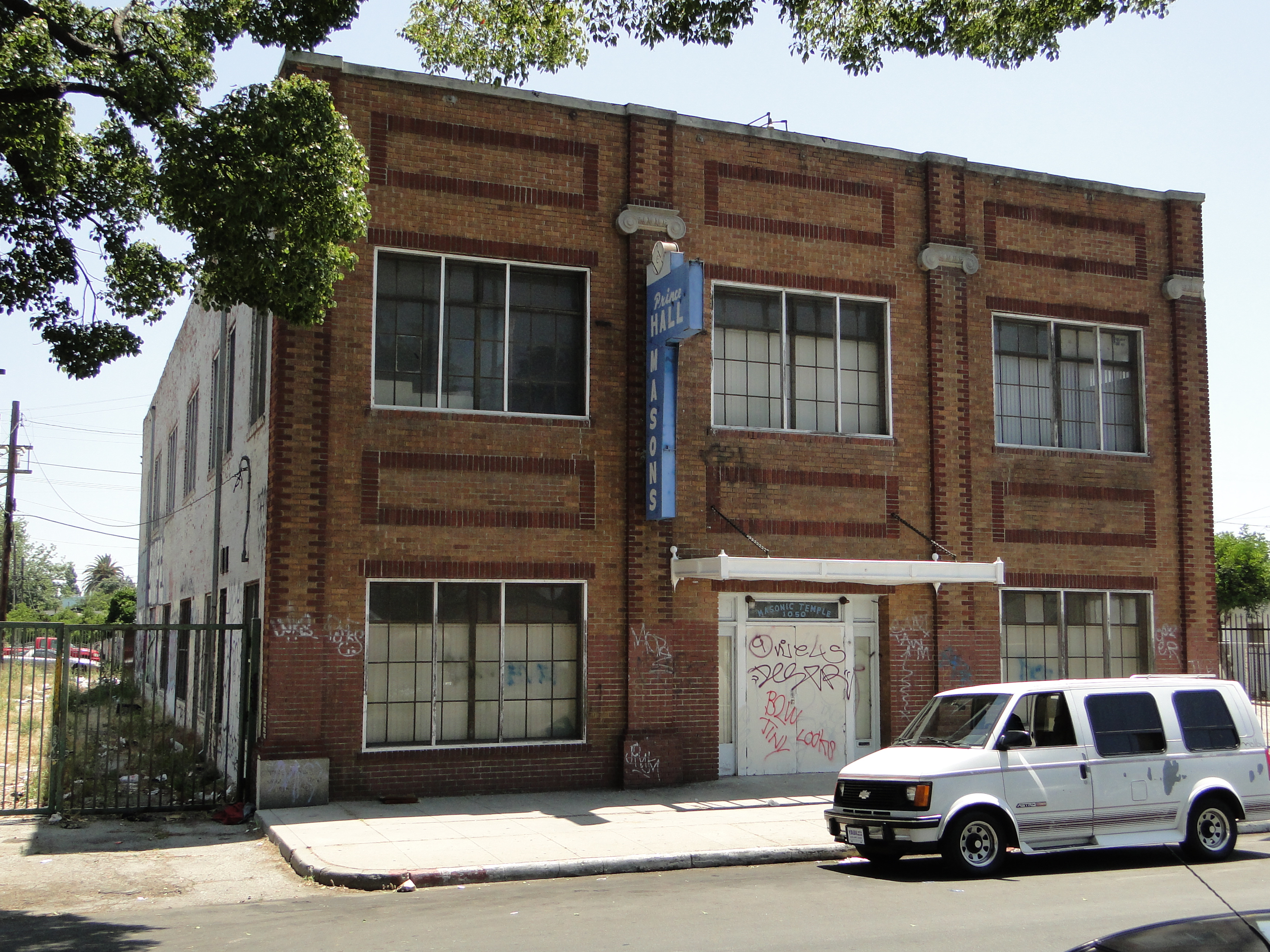
Prince Hall Masonic Temple, Los Angeles, California

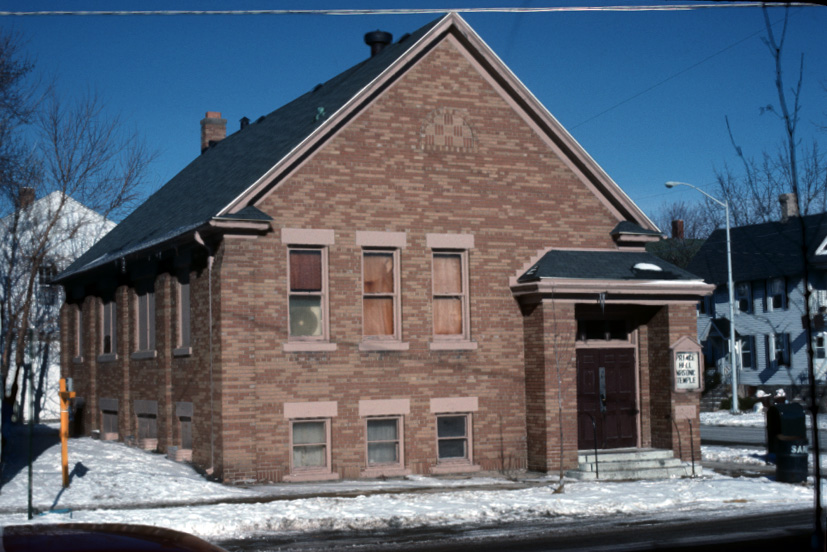
Prince Hall Masonic Temple, Madison, WI

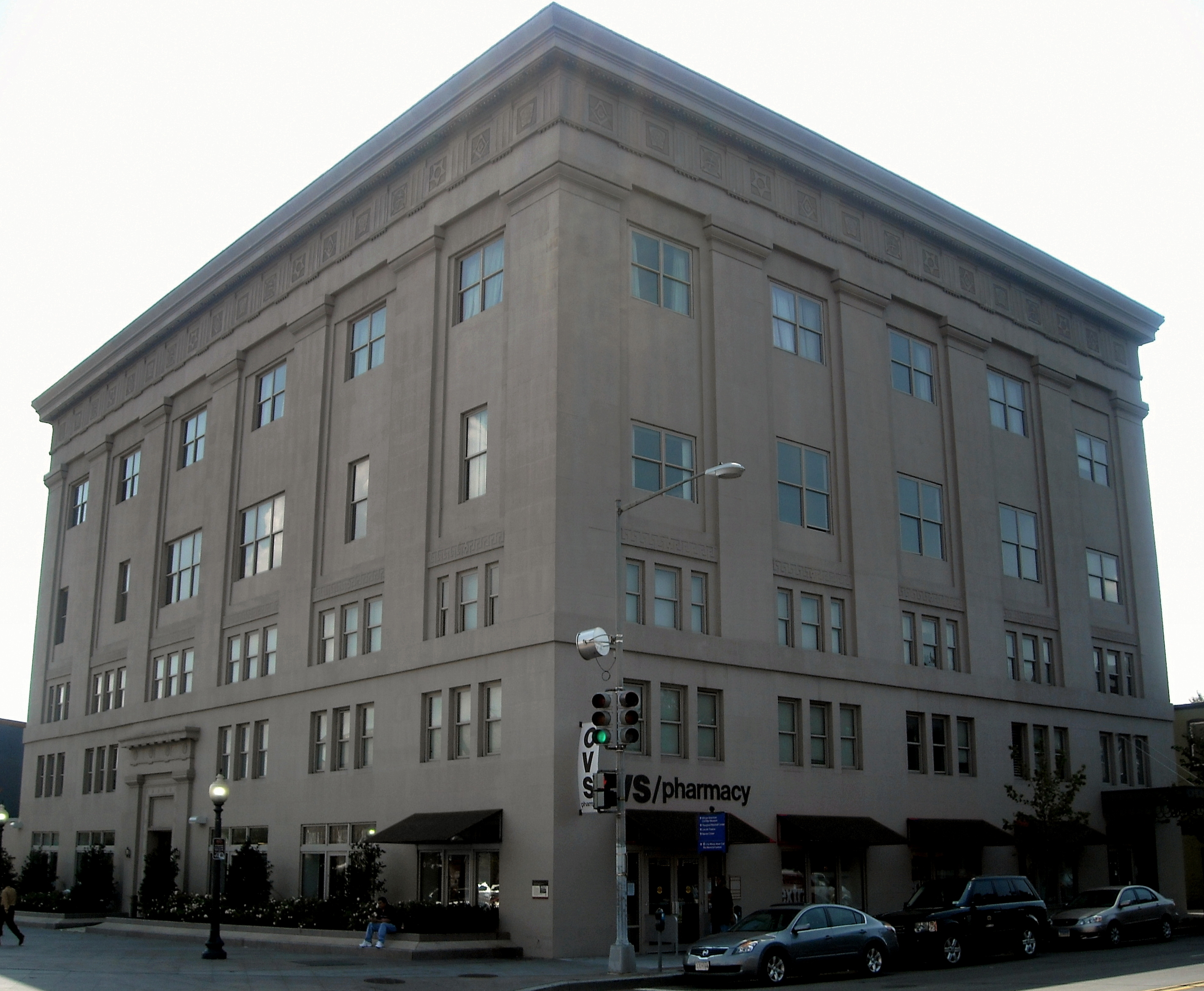
Prince Hall Masonic Temple, Washington, D.C.

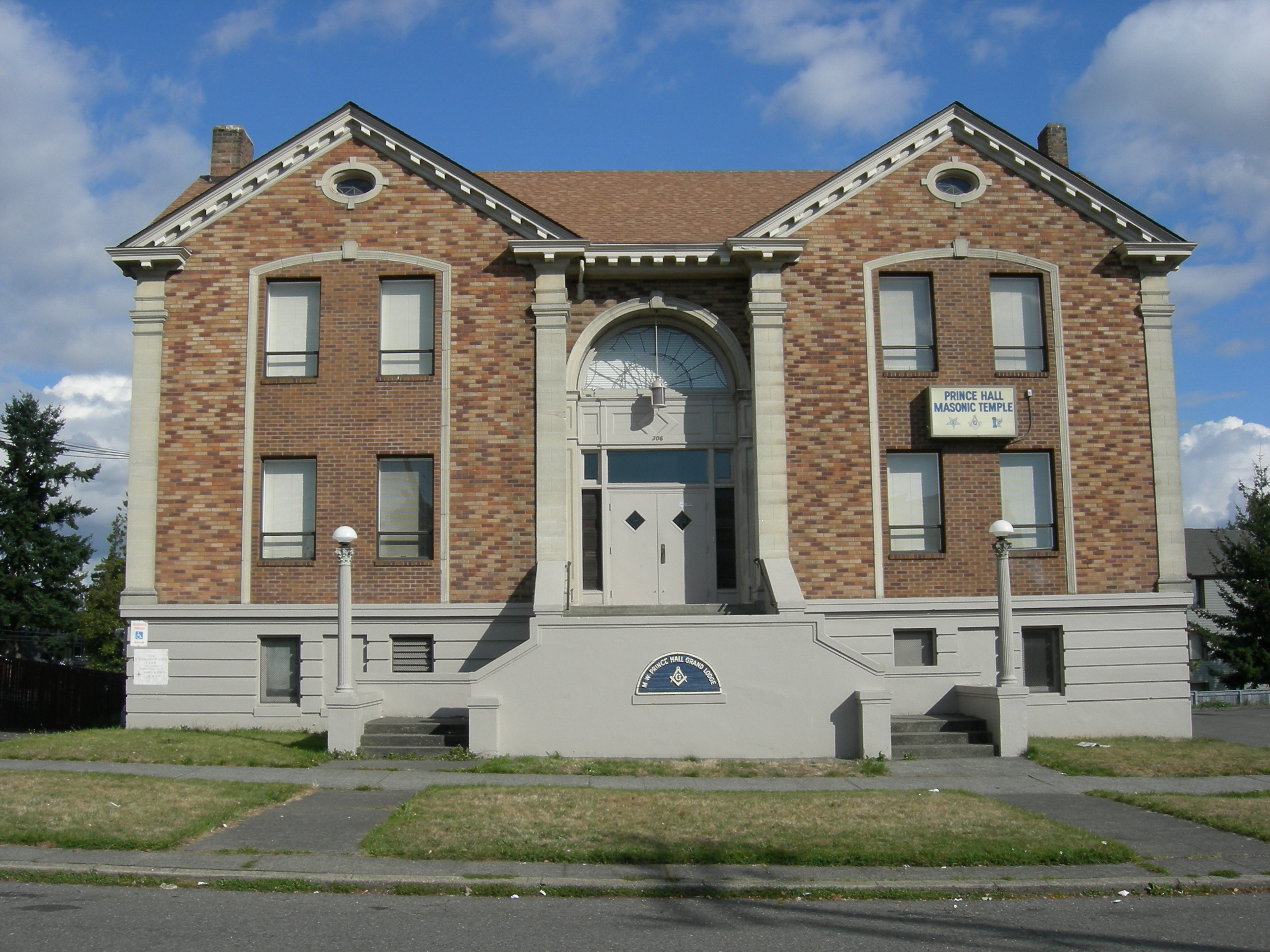
Prince Hall Masonic Temple, Seattle, WA

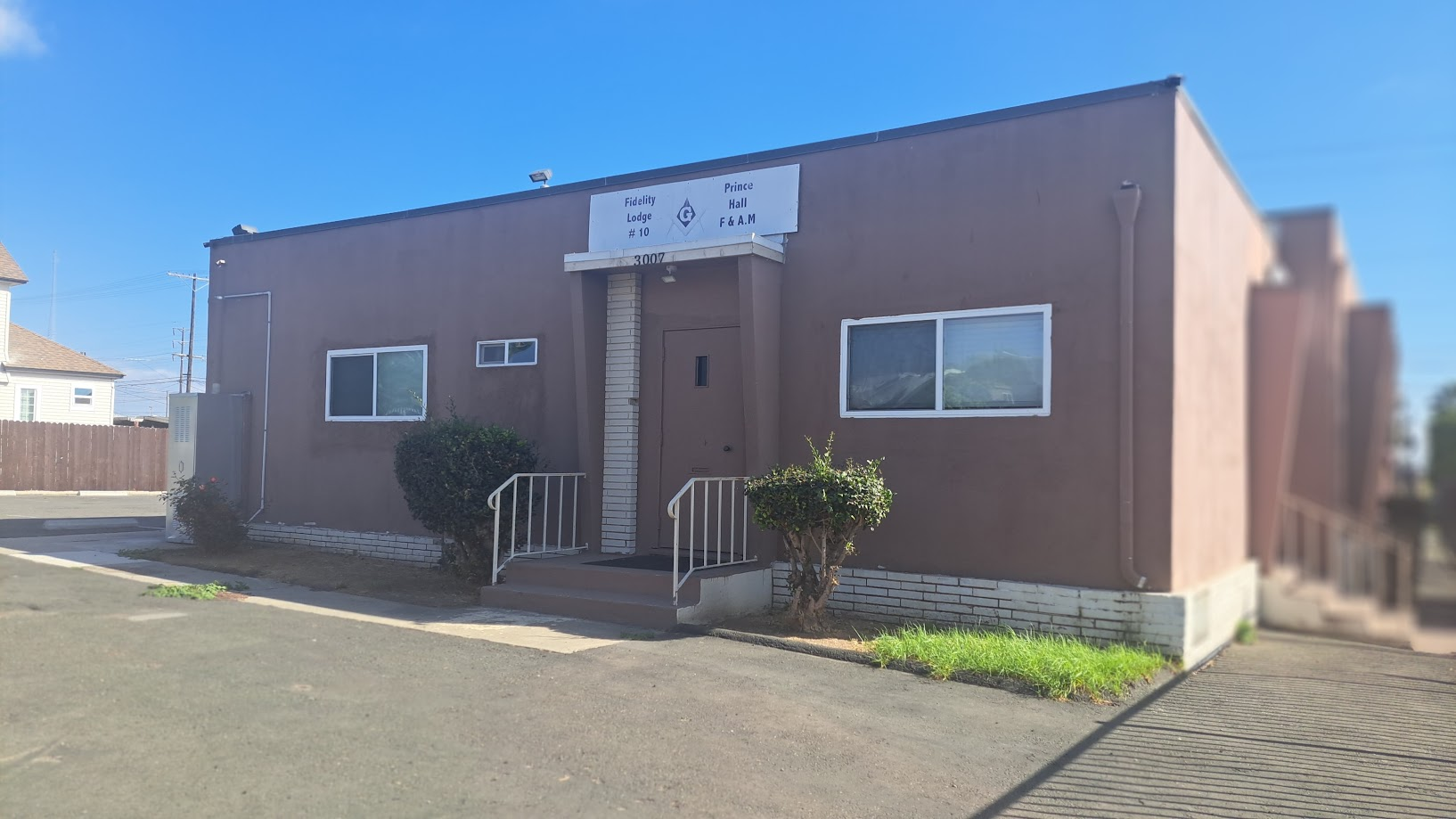
Fidelity Lodge #10, San Diego, CA

== Legacy ==
Prince Hall's legacy as a Freemason and a leader has survived with the lodges; Hall is considered the "father of African-American Freemasonry". As a Georgia Mason noted, the original local lodge rules written by Prince Hall and his followers in the late 18th century were the first set of regulations drafted by colored men for self-government in the United States, and Masonry ever since has striven to teach its members 'the fundamentals of central government' which is the basis of American life."

While no Grand Lodge of any kind is universally recognized, at present, Prince Hall Masonry is recognized by some UGLE-recognized Grand Lodges and not by others, but it is working its way toward further recognition.

When two Grand Lodges recognize and are in Masonic communication with each other, they are said to be in amity, and the brethren of each may visit each other's lodges and interact Masonically. When two Grand Lodges are not in amity, inter-visitation is not allowed. Exclusive Jurisdiction can be waived when the two over-lapping Grand Lodges are themselves in Amity and agree to share jurisdiction. For example, since the Grand Lodge of Connecticut is in Amity with the Prince Hall Grand Lodge of Connecticut, the principle of Exclusive Jurisdiction does not apply, and other Grand Lodges may recognize both.

After carefully studying the records, the Grand Lodge of England concluded that the original Prince Hall Grand Lodge of Massachusetts was indeed entitled to Masonic recognition, despite the general tradition of "exclusive jurisdiction", which meant that only one recognized Masonic body could exist in each state.

In 2026, 47 out of the 51 mainstream U.S. Grand Lodges recognize Prince Hall Grand Lodges. The few mainstream state Grand Lodges that currently do not recognize Prince Hall Grand Lodges are located in southern states, an area with an estimated 50% of Prince Hall Freemasons: Mississippi, Louisiana, South Carolina and West Virginia. While African-Americans can join any lodge in North America, Prince Hall Masonry remains a vital part of American tradition.

== Notable members ==
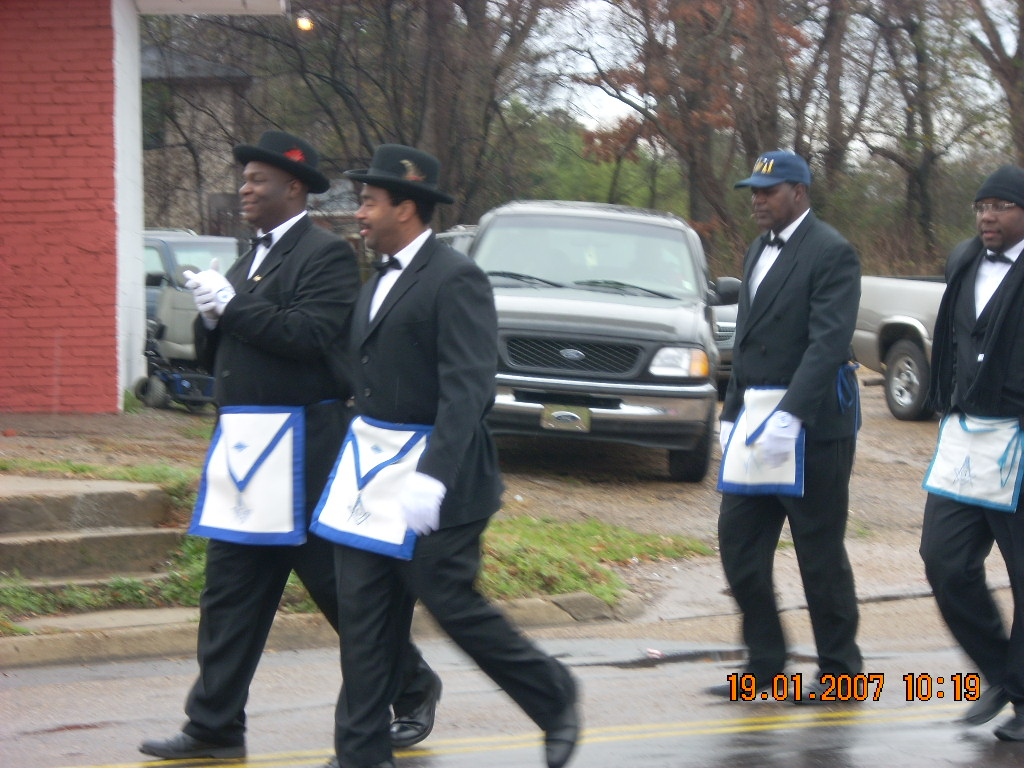
Prince Hall Lodge Masons, Jackson Mississippi, 2007

There have been many notable Masons who were affiliated with Prince Hall originated Grand Lodges, including:

- On January 19, 2025, on his last day in office, President Joseph Biden was presented with a "resolution of membership" in the Prince Hall Grand Lodge of Free and Accepted Masons of the State of South Carolina.
- John Conyers, US Representative
- Elijah Cummings, US Representative
- Norris Wright Cuney, politician, businessman, union leader, and civil rights activist; 1st (1875–1876) and 4th (1879–1881) Grand Master, Most Worshipful Prince Hall Grand Lodge of Texas
- Thomas Dalton, Boston, Massachusetts, Grand Master 1831–1832, son-in-law of Barzillai Lew. He and David Walker oversaw the publication of John T. Hilton's An Address, Delivered Before the African Grand Lodge of Boston, No. 459, June 24th, 1828, by John T. Hilton: On the Annual Festival, of St. John the Baptist (Boston, 1828)
- Duke Ellington Harlem Renaissance jazz musician and composer
- A. G. Gaston, entrepreneur
- Al Green, American singer, songwriter, and record producer
- Prince Hall, Boston, Massachusetts, Grand Master 1791–1807
- John T. Hilton, Grand Master 1826–1827 Hilton helped organize the National Grand Lodge of Prince Hall Freemasonry and served as the first National Grand Master. Hilton was the Grand Master of the National Grand Lodge of North America for ten years
- Benjamin Hooks, civil rights leader and government official
- Jesse Jackson, Civil Rights leader
- Emmanuel Lewis, former child actor, known for Webster
- John Lewis, US Representative
- Walker Lewis, Lowell, Massachusetts, Grand Master 1829–1830. After the African Lodge declared its independence from the Grand Lodge of London and became its own African Grand Lodge, Walker Lewis was the Grand Master of African Grand Lodge #1 for 1829 and 1830
- Thurgood Marshall, lawyer, first African American to serve on the Supreme Court of the United States
- Ben Crump, civil rights attorney
- Ralph Metcalfe, US Representative
- Kweisi Mfume, US Representative
- George Middleton, Boston, Massachusetts, Grand Master 1809–1810. Commander, Bucks of America, a unit of black soldiers during the American Revolution; a founder of the African Benevolent Society
- Kwame Nkrumah, politician, political theorist and revolutionary, Prime Minister, 1952 - 1960; President of Ghana, 1960 - 1966
- Richard Pryor, comedian and actor
- Charles Rangel, US Representative
- Sugar Ray Robinson, Hall of Fame boxer
- Louis Stokes, US Representative
- Booker T. Washington, Educator and Civil Rights leader.
- James Monroe Whitfield, Abolitionist poet from Exeter, NH. Author of "America and other Poems" 1853. In 1864–1869 he was Grand Master of the California order of Prince Hall Masons. Originally a member of Hannibal #1. He is buried in the Masonic Cemetery in San Francisco
- Harry Albro Williamson, prolific researcher and writer on the subject of black Freemasonry

== See also ==
- Prince Hall Mystic Cemetery
- List of Freemasons
- Masonic Order of Liberia
- Prince Hall Order of the Eastern Star
- List of African-American Greek and fraternal organizations
- Knights of Pythias of North America, South America, Europe, Asia, Africa and Australia
