= Prince Hall =

American free Black leader and Freemason (c. 1736 – 1807)

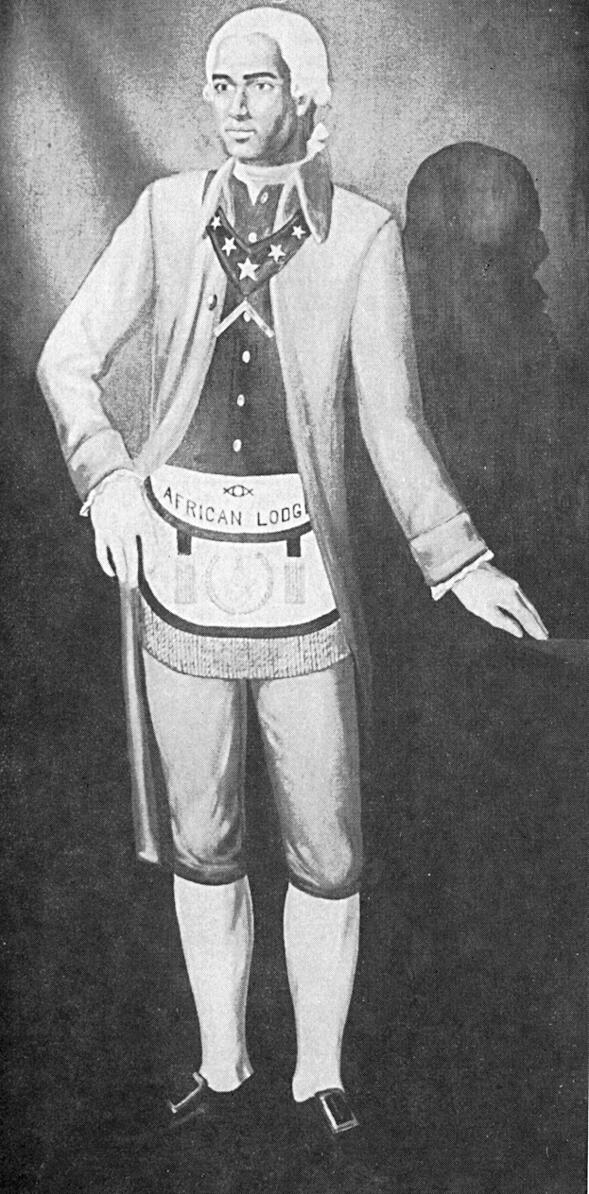
- Hall wearing an African Lodge sash
- Born: c. 1735/38; New England, British America
- Died: December 4, 1807; Boston, Massachusetts, US
- Burial place: Copp's Hill Burying Ground
- Occupation: Leatherworker
- Known for: Founded Prince Hall Freemasonry

Prince Hall (c. 1735/38 – December 7, 1807) was an American abolitionist and leader in the free Black community in Boston. He founded Prince Hall Freemasonry and lobbied for education rights for Black-American children. He was also active in the Back-to-Africa movement.

Hall tried to gain a place for New York's enslaved and free Blacks in Freemasonry, education, and the military. Hall is considered the founder of "Black Freemasonry" in the United States, known today as Prince Hall Freemasonry. He formed the African Grand Lodge of North America, and was unanimously elected its Grand Master and served until he died in 1807. Steve Gladstone, author of Freedom Trail Boston, states that Hall was "one of the most influential free black leaders in the late 1700s".

There is confusion about his birth year, place of birth, parents, and marriages, partly because there were numerous "Prince Halls" during this period.

== Early life ==
Hall's exact birthdate, including year, is uncertain. Some sources cite 1735, others 1738, and one cites 1748. (Note: Death notices that link Prince Hall to African Lodge, published on December 7, 1807, say he died at the age of 72, suggesting he was born in 1735. A deposition dated August 31, 1807 records his age as "about 70 years". A letter written in 1795 by Reverend Jeremy Belknap, a founder of the Massachusetts Historical Society, places Hall's birth in 1737 or 1738, based upon Prince Hall's stated age when Hall and Belknap met.) The Prince Hall Grand Lodge of Massachusetts, in its Proceedings of 1906, opted for 1738, relying on a letter from Reverend Jeremy Belknap, a founder of the Massachusetts Historical Society. Hall's birthday is traditionally celebrated on September 14. His place of birth and parents are also unclear. (Note: The exact location where Prince Hall was born remains unknown. William H. Grimshaw asserted in his 1903 The Official History of Freemasonry among the Colored People in North America, that Hall was born in Bridgetown, Barbados, in 1748. Grimshaw believed Hall was the son of English leather merchant Thomas Hall, and his mother was of French descent. Historian Charles H. Wesley, in his 1977 work Prince Hall Life and Legacy, said there are unsubstantiated claims that William Hall was his father and his mother was a free woman of color. While Wesley and Walkes were keen to debunk Grimshaw and prove where Prince Hall was not born, they could not discover where he was born. Historian James Sidbury said: "It is more likely that he was a native of New England.") Hall mentioned in his writings that New England was his homeland.

Historian Charles H. Wesley theorized that by age 11, Hall was enslaved (or in service) to Boston tanner William Hall. It was through William Hall that Prince learned how to process and dress leather.

By 1770 he was a free, literate man and had been always accounted as a free man. (Note: Wesley developed a theory about Prince Hall's early years. Based upon his research, by age 11, Prince Hall was enslaved by Boston tanner William Hall. By 1770, Prince Hall was a free, literate Black man living in Boston. A manumission certificate for Prince Hall, dated one month after the Boston Massacre in April 1770, stated he was "no longer Reckoned a slave, but always accounted as a free man".) Inside Prince Hall author and historian David L. Gray states that he was unable to find an official historical record of the manumission. (Note: The primary source of this claim that Prince Hall was enslaved came from an unoriginal manumission document found in the private diary of public notary Ezekiel Price (c. 1728–1802). This manumission was discovered by John Sherman and published in the Philalethes magazine in 1973. Historian and founder of the Phylaxis Society Joseph Walkes tried to locate original evidence of the manumission at the Massachusetts Historical Society and the Secretary of the Commonwealth, both without success. Historian David L. Gray noted: "The name Prince Hall, surprisingly, was not unique to the Boston area in the second half of the 18th century.") Hall was able to read and write, and may have been self-taught, or may have had assistance. (Note: Sidbury contends that Hall was in Richmond, CA, by 1763 (end of the Seven Years' War).)

== Revolutionary War ==
Hall encouraged enslaved and freed Blacks to serve in the American colonial military. He believed that if Blacks were involved in founding the new nation, it would aid in attaining freedom for all Blacks. Hall proposed that the Massachusetts Committee of Safety allow Blacks to join the military. He and fellow supporters petition compared the Intolerable Acts with the enslavement of Blacks. Their proposal was declined.

England issued Dunmore's Proclamation in 1775. It guaranteed freedom to Blacks who enlisted in the British Army. Once the British Army filled its ranks with Black troops, the Continental Army reversed its decision and allowed Blacks into the military. It is believed, but not certain, that Hall was one of the six "Prince Halls" from Massachusetts to serve during the war.

Having served during the Revolutionary War, many African Americans expected, but did not receive, racial equality when the war ended. Intending to improve the lives of fellow African Americans, Hall collaborated with others to propose legislation for equal rights. He also hosted community events, such as educational forums and theatre events, to improve the lives of Black people.

== Freemasonry ==
Hall was interested in the Masonic fraternity because Freemasonry was founded on liberty, equality, and peaceful ideals. Before the American Revolutionary War, Hall and fourteen other free Black men petitioned for admittance to the all-white Boston St. John's Lodge. They were turned down. Having been rejected by colonial Freemasonry, Hall and 15 others sought and were initiated into Masonry by members of Lodge No. 441 of the Grand Lodge of Ireland on March 6, 1775. The Lodge was attached to the British forces stationed in Boston.

Hall and other freedmen founded African Lodge No. 1 on July 3, 1776. The black Masons had limited power; they could meet as a lodge, participate in the Masonic procession on St. John's Day, and bury their dead with Masonic rites but could not confer Masonic degrees or perform any other essential functions of a fully operating Lodge.

Consequently, they applied to the Premier Grand Lodge of England for a charter. The Grand Master of the Premier Grand Lodge of England, H. R. H. The Duke of Cumberland, issued a charter for the African Lodge No. 1, later renamed African Lodge No. 459 September 29, 1784. The lodge was the country's first African Masonic lodge. On March 22, 1797, Hall organized a lodge in Philadelphia, called African Lodge #459, under what was known as Prince Hall's Charter. They later received their own charter. On June 25, 1797, he organized the African Lodge (later known as Hiram Lodge #3) at Providence, Rhode Island.

Prince Hall was named a Provincial Grand Master in 1791 and Prince Hall served as the first Grand Master.

Author and historian James Sidbury wrote:

Prince Hall and those who joined him to found Boston's African Masonic Lodge built a fundamentally new "African" movement on a preexisting institutional foundation. Within that movement, they asserted emotional, mythical, and genealogical links to the continent of Africa and its peoples.

After Hall died on December 4, 1807, the brethren organized the African Grand Lodge on June 24, 1808, including the Philadelphia, Providence, and Boston lodges. African Grand Lodge declared independence from the United Grand Lodge of England and all other lodges in 1827. In 1847, they renamed Prince Hall Grand Lodge to honor their founder.

Hall was considered the "father of African Freemasonry". Hall said of civic activities:

My brethren, let us pay all due respect to all who God had put in places of honor over us: do justly and be faithful to them that hire you and treat them with the respect they may deserve but worship no man. Worship God, this much is your duty as Christians and as masons.

== Community activism ==
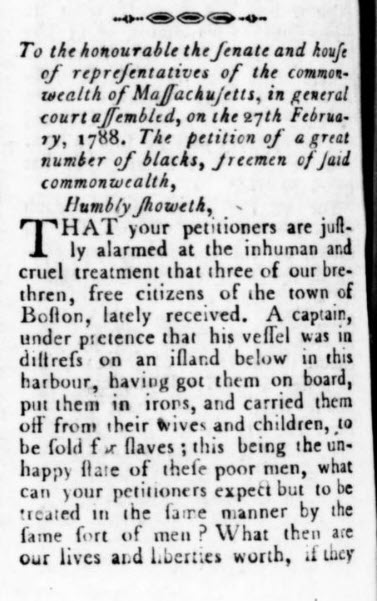
"Petition of a Number of Blacks" reprinted in The American Museum Magazine, 1788

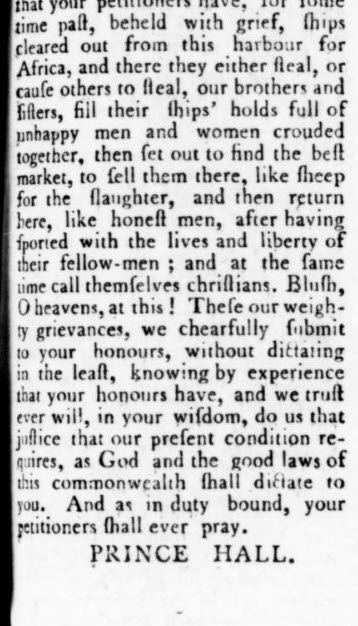
"Petition of a Number of Blacks" reprinted in The American Museum Magazine, 1788

Hall worked within the state political arena to advance the rights of blacks, end slavery, and protect free blacks from being kidnapped by slave traders. He proposed a back-to-Africa movement, pressed for equal educational opportunities, and operated a school for African Americans in his home. He engaged in public speaking and debate, citing Christian scripture against slavery to a predominantly Christian legislative body.

=== Education ===
Hall requested that the Massachusetts Congress create a school program for black children. He cited the same platform for fighting the American Revolution of "Taxation without Representation." Hall and other Black Bostonians wanted a separate school to distance themselves from white supremacy and create well-educated Black citizens. Although Hall's arguments were logical, his two attempts at passing legislation through the Massachusetts Congress both failed. Hall then started a school program for free black children out of his own home with a focus on Liberal Arts and classical education.

=== Speech and petition writing ===
Hall is known for giving speeches and writing petitions. In a speech given to the Boston African Masonic Lodge, Hall stated, "My brethren, let us not be cast down under these and many other abuses we at present labour under: for the darkest is before the break of day... Let us remember what a dark day it was with our African brethren, six years ago, in the French West Indies. Nothing but the snap of the whip was heard, from morning to evening".

His 1788 petition to the Massachusetts legislature protested the abuse and kidnapping of fellow Black Boston residents and called out many atrocities faced by the community.

Hall's notable written works include the 1792 Charge and 1797 Charge. Hall's 1792 Charge focused on the abolition of slavery in his home state of Massachusetts. He addressed the importance of black leaders in shaping the country and creating unity. In his 1797 Charge, Hall wrote about the treatment and hostility that blacks received in the United States. He recognized black revolutionaries in the Haitian Revolution. Hall was one of several free blacks in Massachusetts who presented a petition to the legislature in 1788 protesting African-American seamen being sold into slavery.

In a speech he presented in June 1797, Hall said:

Patience, I say; for were we not possessed of a great measure of it, we could not bear up under the daily insults we meet with in the streets of Boston, much more on public days of recreation. How, at such times, are we shamefully abused, and that to such a degree, that we may truly be said to carry our lives in our hands, and the arrows of death are flying about our heads. ...tis not for want of courage in you, for they know that they dare not face you man for man, but in a mob.

=== Back-to-Africa movement ===
Hall was involved in the Back-to-Africa movement and approached the legislature to request funds for voluntary emigration to Africa. In January 1773, Hall and 73 other African-American delegates presented an emigration plea to the Massachusetts Senate. This plea, which included the contentions that African Americans are better suited to Africa's climate and lifestyle, failed. When a group of freed black men had begun a trip to Africa, they were captured and held, which reignited Hall's interest in the movement.

== Personal life ==
Hall joined the Congregational Church in 1762. He married an enslaved woman named Sarah Ritchie or Ritchery, who died in 1769. Hall married Flora Gibbs of Gloucester, Massachusetts in 1770. David Gray states he was married for a second time to Sylvia (Zilpha) Ward Hall. An article about Hall for Africans in America by PBS states that he married a woman named Delia, a servant outside William Hall's household, and had a son named Primus in 1756. (Note: Primus was a Revolutionary War soldier, having enlisted at the age of 19. Primus also established a school in his home for educating African-American children and sought funding from the community, including African-American sailors. Elisha Sylvester and two Harvard University students taught there. In 1800, the school was moved to the African Meeting House, a church built by Thomas Paul. Primus Hall continued fund-raising to support the African-American school until 1835.) However, in his research, Gray found no record of the marriage or son, suggesting Primus Hall was from a different family. (Note: Gray wrote, "There is no other evidence that 'our' Prince Hall was the father of Primus. Their paths crossed several times over the years, but no such claim was recorded before 1836. Primus made no claim on Prince Hall's estate, such as it was, in 1807/8, and there is no record of the alleged marriage to Delia... if Primus made a true statement in his pension claim, and 'his' Prince Hall was indeed 'our' Prince Hall, then the Masonic Prince Hall was a free man in 1756 and could not have been the slave who was manumitted by the William Hall family in 1770. Nor is there evidence of other children by any of the women registered as marrying a man named Prince Hall in the Boston area in the relevant period. It is likely that 'our' Prince Hall fathered no children, but devoted his considerable energy to the well-being of his community and his lodge, leaving as his legacy a lodge which sired a whole fraternity, Prince Hall Freemasonry.")

In Boston, Hall worked as a peddler, caterer, and leatherworker, owning a leather shop. In April 1777, he created five leather drumheads for an artillery regiment of Boston. Hall was a homeowner who voted and paid taxes.

Hall died on December 4, 1807, and is buried in Copp's Hill Burying Ground in Boston along with other notable Bostonians from the colonial era. Thousands of other African Americans who lived in the "New Guinea" community at the base of Copp's Hill are buried alongside Snowhill Street in unmarked graves.

His wife, Sylvia (Zilpha), was the executrix of his estate, which amounted to $47.22, and there was no realty.

== Monuments ==
A tribute monument to Hall was erected on Copp's Hill on June 24, 1835, next to his grave marker. The inscription reads: "Here lies ye body of Prince Hall, first Grand Master of the colored Grand Lodge in Mass. Died Dec. 7, 1807". (Note: According to Gray, newspaper accounts showed that Hall died on December 4 and was buried three days later, meaning the monument incorrectly lists the burial date.)

The Prince Hall Monument, by Ted Clausen, was erected in Cambridge, Massachusetts.

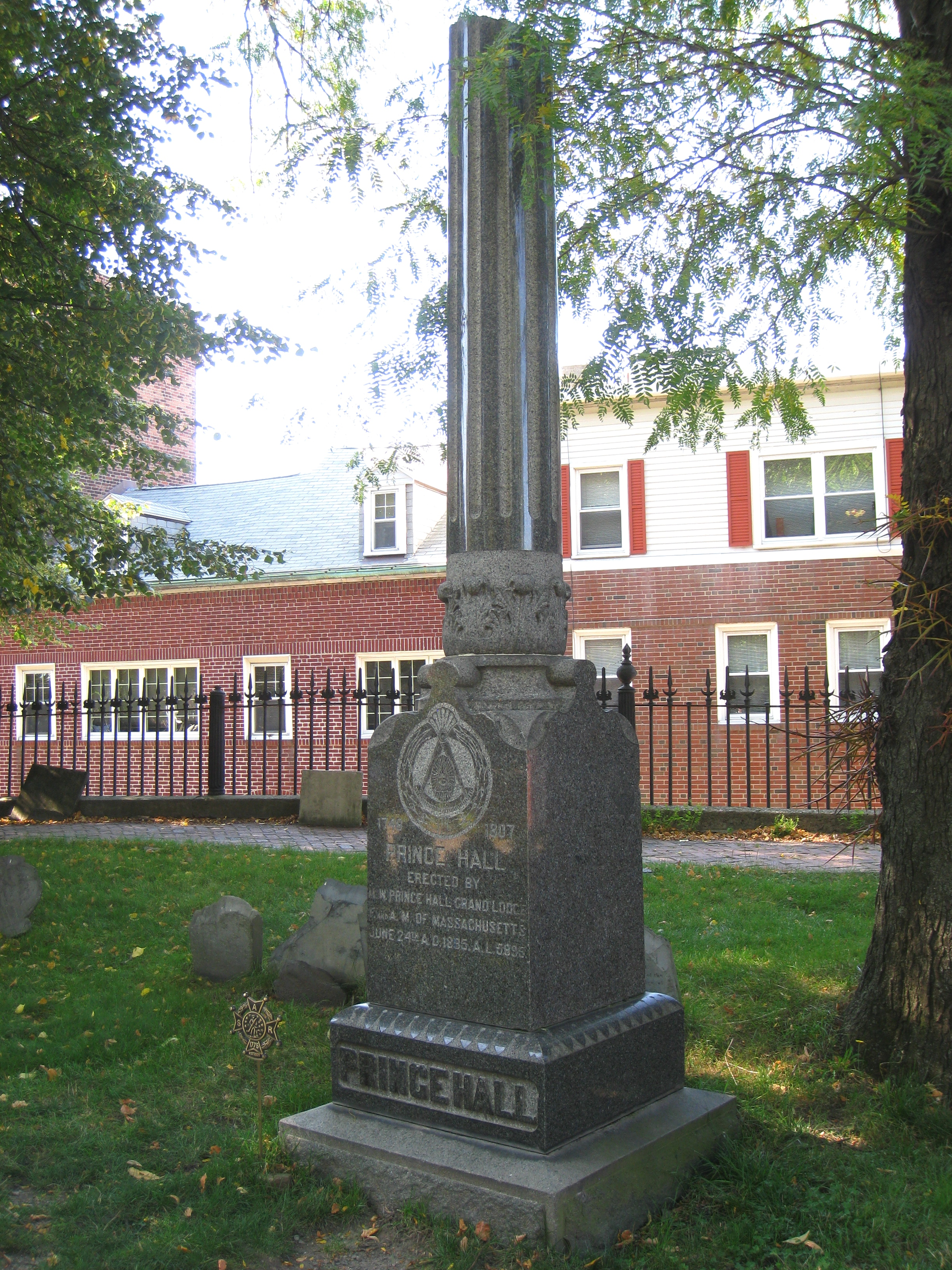
Prince Hall Monument in Copp's Hill Burying Ground

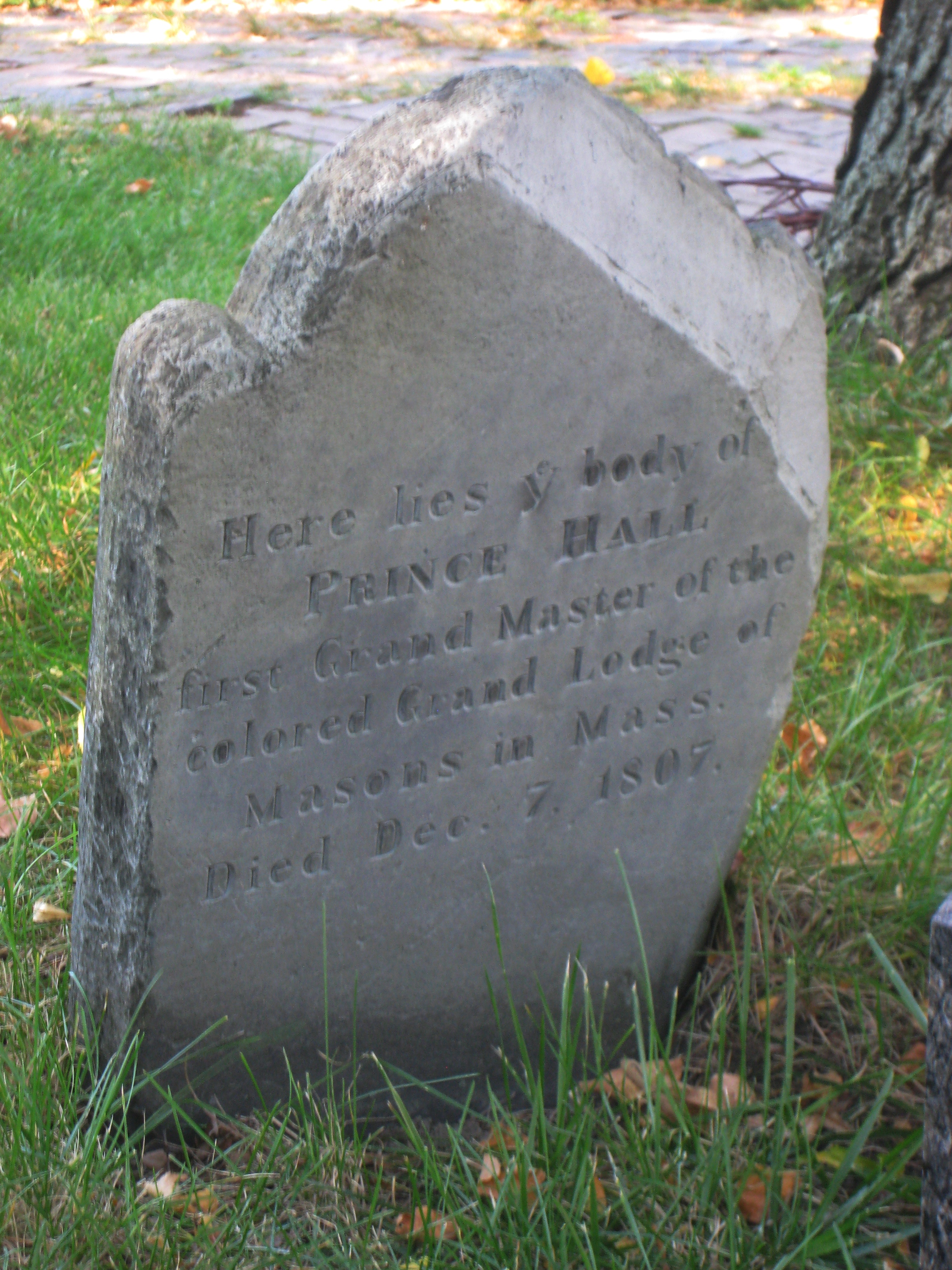
Hall's tombstone in Copp's Hill Burying Ground

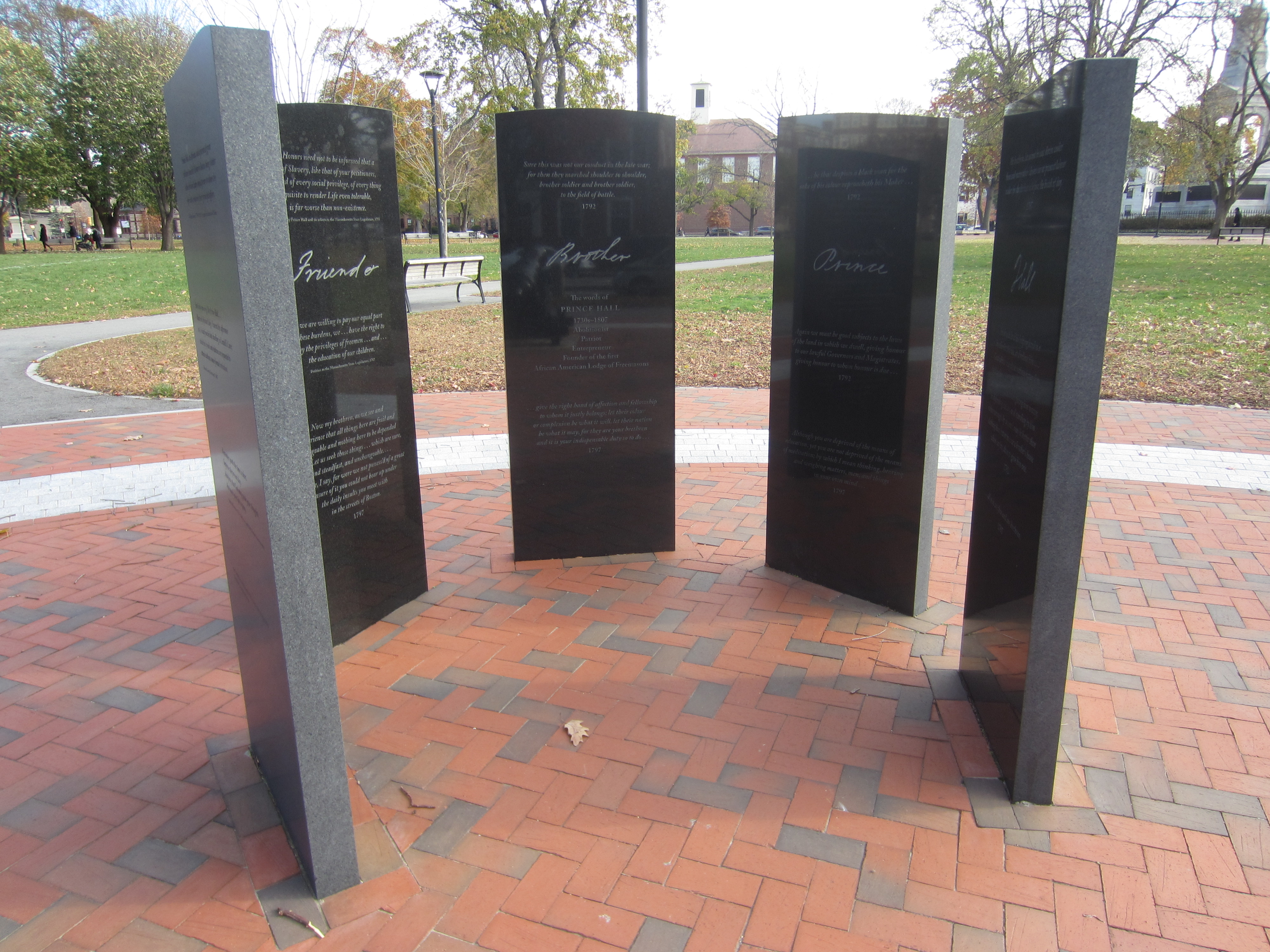
Prince Hall Monument in Cambridge

== See also ==
- African Lodge No. 459
- Prince Hall Freemasonry
- African American founding fathers of the United States
