= Grand Lodge of Massachusetts =

Freemason lodge in the United States

Grand Lodge of Massachusetts A.F. & A.M.
- Seal of the Grand Lodge of Massachusetts A.F. & A.M.
- Established: 1733
- Location: United States
- Region served: Massachusetts
- Website: massfreemasonry.org

The Most Worshipful Grand Lodge of Ancient Free and Accepted Masons of the Commonwealth of Massachusetts, commonly referred to as the Grand Lodge of Massachusetts and abbreviated GLMA, is the main governing body of Freemasonry within Massachusetts. It maintains Lodges in other jurisdictions overseas, namely Panama, Chile, the People's Republic of China (meeting in Tokyo, Japan), and Guantanamo Bay Naval Base in Cuba.

Founded in 1733, it is the third oldest chartered Masonic Grand Lodge in existence, after the United Grand Lodge of England (1717) and the Grand Lodge of Ireland (1725).

In 1733 a warrant was issued, creating Henry Price the Provincial Grand Master of New England. Price's successors as Provincial Grand Master, Robert Tomlinson, Thomas Oxnard, Jeremy Gridley and John Rowe, were all appointed (in 1736, 1743, 1755 and 1768 respectively) by the Moderns' Grand Master in London. The Provincial Grand Lodge, which, due to the American Revolution, held no meeting during the period 1775 to 1787, finally merged with its counterpart Antient Provincial Grand Lodge, created in 1769 by the Grand Lodge of Scotland. On the date of that merger, 5 March 1792, the newly created body first exercised its new sovereign powers by electing a Grand Master in the person of John Cutler, and by adopting the name The Grand Lodge of the Most Ancient and Honorable Society of Free and Accepted Masons of the Commonwealth of Massachusetts.

== First Provincial Grand Lodge ==
Freemasonry in Massachusetts dates to the early 18th century, and the foundation of its Grand Lodge is wound through with the threads of the (then) ongoing disputes between the Moderns and the Antients.

After the formation of the Premier Grand Lodge of England (later referred to as the Moderns) in 1717, and the amalgamation of individual Lodges into that body, Lodges and Masons in the Boston area asked one Brother Henry Price to go to London, and petition the Grand Lodge for a Warrant in order to be considered regular, in accordance with a regulation dated in 1721.

Price did so, and returned in the spring of 1733 with more than just a Warrant for an individual Lodge - he was made the "Provincial Grand Master of New England and Dominions and Territories thereunto belonging" by the Grand Master, The Right Honorable and Right Worshipful Anthony Browne, 6th Viscount Montagu.

This Provincial Grand Lodge was historically known as St. John's Grand Lodge, and chartered numerous Lodges in the Colonies. The first one, which was chartered in Boston in 1733, was known and recorded as First Lodge in the English rolls of 1734, and is now known as St. John's Lodge.

== Scotland, Ireland, and the Antients ==
In a manner similar to the creation of St. John's Grand Lodge, a number of Masons who had been active in the Antients style of Freemasonry grouped together, and petitioned the Grand Lodge of Scotland for a warrant, which was given to "The Lodge of St Andrew" in 1756. These Antient Freemasons, desiring equal stature with the Moderns, joined with the Lodges attached to three British military units in petitioning the GL of Scotland for Provincial GL status:

Lodge of St. Andrew (Scotland)
British Army Lodge #58 (Antient) in the 14th Regiment of Foot
Glittering Star Lodge #322 (Ireland) with the 29th Regiment
Lodge Number 106 (Scotland) with the 64th Regiment (which left before the inauguration of the GM, Joseph Warren)

Due to the Revolution, and based on the state of affairs between the US and Great Britain, the Scottish Provincial Grand Lodge drafted new constitutions, breaking from the Grand Lodge of Scotland and becoming Massachusetts Grand Lodge in 1782.

There was a growing rift in the Lodge of St Andrew regarding this decision to separate, and in December of that same year, it came to a vote. Thirty Masons voted to stay part of the Grand Lodge of Scotland, and nineteen voted for the Massachusetts Grand Lodge. No action was taken on this vote, and it was laid on the table until the end of the war. In January 1784, they voted again, with twenty-nine voting for Scotland, and twenty-three for Massachusetts. Those voting for membership in the Massachusetts Grand Lodge were expelled from the Lodge of St. Andrew. However, they formed their own Lodge of St. Andrew under the new Massachusetts Grand Lodge, which caused confusion for some time, until it was renamed Rising States Lodge.

== Founding Fathers and the St. Andrew Lodge ==
Dr. Joseph Warren was the Master of the Lodge of St. Andrews when he was killed by the British at the Battle of Bunker Hill. He was replaced as Master by John Hancock who would become President of Continental Congress and be the only member of Congress to actually sign the Declaration of Independence on July 4, 1776. Paul Revere was also a Mason and member of the Lodge. Bostonian Samuel Adams and his cousin John Adams from nearby Quincy were not Masons.

== The Grand Lodge building ==
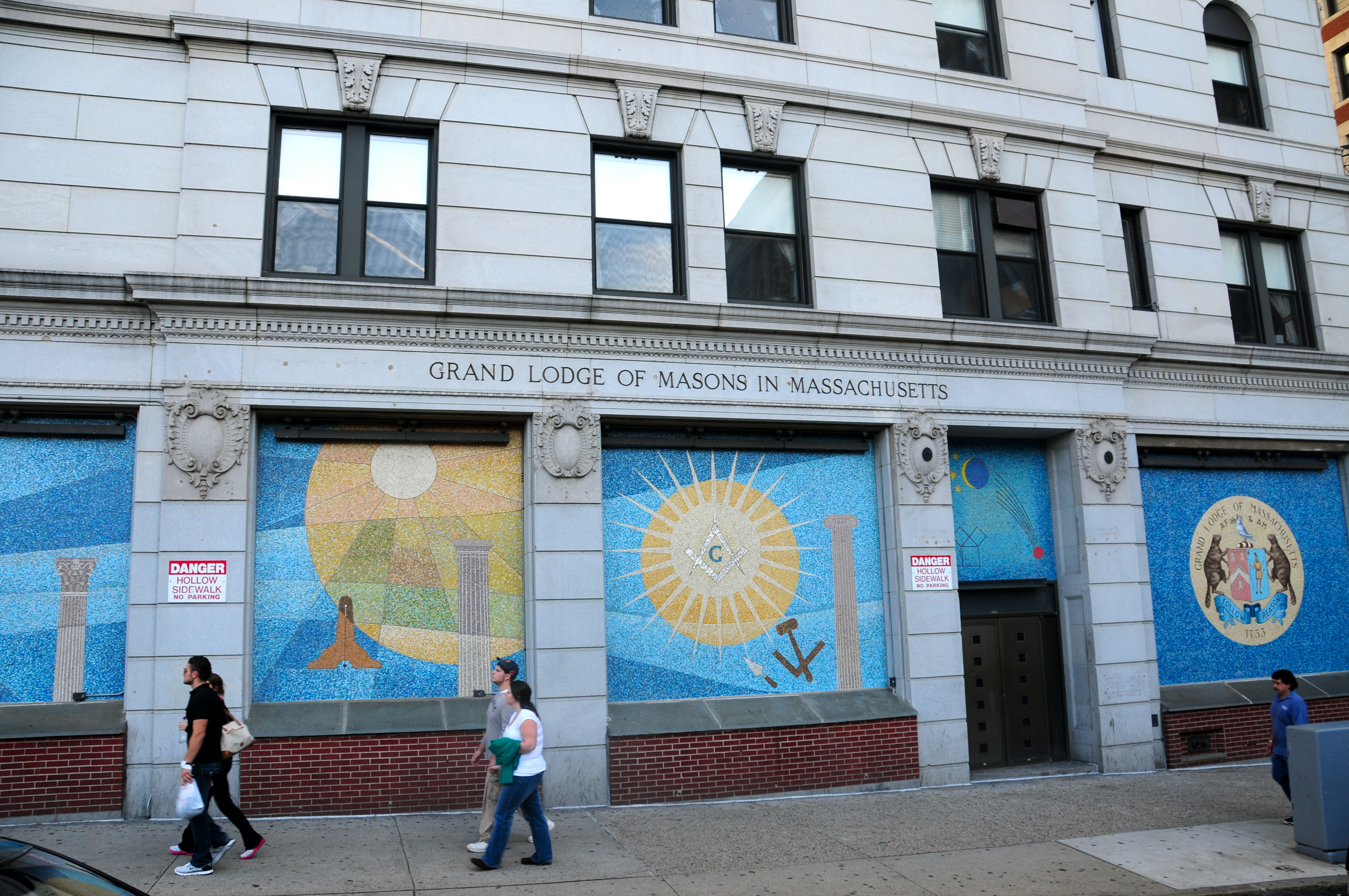
Tremont Street frontage of the current Grand Lodge building in Boston

Although there are indications that Freemasons met at several Boston locations in the 1720s, the constitution of the First Lodge, later named St John, took place at the Bunch of Grapes Tavern on July 30, 1733. This is also considered the first “home” of the Provincial Grand Lodge. After the Revolutionary War there were references to the Royal Exchange Coffee House as a potential site for a home but few records exist. The second floor of the Old State House was leased in 1821. This is the only building remaining in the city that housed the Grand Lodge prior to its present building. In 1830, the Grand Lodge purchased land at the corner of Tremont Street and Temple Place and proceeded to lay the cornerstone for a Masonic Temple. A battle with the Commonwealth over the Grand Lodge Acts of Incorporation caused the Grand Lodge to sell the building to Brother Robert Gould Shaw, who sold it back to the Grand Lodge in 1835 after anti-Masonic feelings calmed down. The building was sold to the U.S. government for $105,000 for use as a federal courthouse in 1857, because it was no longer adequate for a growing fraternity. Temporary headquarters were relocated to a building on Summer Street. A search for a permanent location ended with the purchase of the Winthrop House at the corner of Tremont and Boylston Streets in 1859. A fire destroyed the building on April 6, 1864. By October a cornerstone was laid for a new building at the same location, and the building was dedicated on June 24, 1867, St. John's Day.

When fire destroyed part of the building in 1895, some wanted to sell the land and relocate. It was decided to tear down the entire building and rebuild a more substantial structure on the same site with nine floors above street level and two below. The cornerstone was laid in June 1898 and the building was dedicated on December 27, 1899. For many years there were storefronts on the street level with an entrance to the Masonic Temple on Boylston Street. In 1966, the stores were vacated, mosaics were added to the exterior, and the entrance was moved to the corner. The interior contained a new lobby and a banquet facility that was named Paul Revere Banquet Hall. In 2017, the street level was converted into a restaurant, and the entrance to the Masonic Temple was moved back to Boylston Street.

== Subordinate lodges in other countries ==
The Grand Lodge of Massachusetts continues to maintain lodges in other parts of the world. As early as 1821, the Grand Master formed a Deputy Grand Lodge at Mayaguez, Puerto Rico, and constituted a lodge there. An independent Grand Lodge was organized in Puerto Rico in 1885. A dispensation was issued to Bethesda Lodge in Valparaiso, Chile, in 1853. Eventually a District Grand Lodge was created, but by 1921 the lodges became merely a district of the Massachusetts Grand Lodge. The Massachusetts` Grand Lodge was responsible for the constitution of several other lodges in China, but by 1950, Grand Master Roger Keith had advised the lodges to go into voluntary recess. In 1952 the charter for Talien Lodge in South Manchuria was revoked and Sinim Lodge was allowed to move from Shanghai to Tokyo. With the construction of the Panama Canal, dispensations were issued to Isthmian Lodge in 1906 and Sojourners Lodge in 1912, both located in the Canal Zone. Grand Master A. Neil Osgood granted a dispensation to Caribbean Naval Lodge at the Guantanamo Naval Base in Cuba in 1965. The lodge had been under the Grand Lodge of Cuba but surrendered its charter and petitioned the Grand Lodge of Massachusetts.

== The Masonic home ==
As early as the 1750s, lodges were requested to contribute to a charity fund to provide relief to needy brethren. By 1811 a permanent charity fund was established with guidelines for its growth. The fund was to be managed by a board of trustees. With the need for funds to purchase the Winthrop House as a location for the Grand Lodge, the fund was depleted. This led to the formation of a more stringent Masonic Educational Charity Trust, which later became known as Masonic Education and Charity Trust. Toward the end of the 19th century, there was talk of the need for a Masonic Home for Masons and widows. Eventually a $1,000 donation from Mount Hope Lodge, Fall River, in 1904 established a fund to build a Masonic Home. Within a few years the fund grew to $48,000 through gifts and pledges. The Overlook Hotel in Charlton was purchased for $50,000 in 1908 along with 397 acres (1.61 km^{2}) of land, and the building was dedicated for use as the Masonic Home on May 25, 1911. Through a major capital campaign, $2.3 million was raised to construct a new wing. Since 1978, the grounds have been used for the Grand Master's Fair each June, except in 2006. With major construction that year, the Fair was moved to the Aleppo Shrine Center in Wilmington. At its peak the Fair attracted nearly 20,000 people. Just before he died in 1991, Bro. James C. Nicoll Jr. requested the trustees of his private charitable foundation to make a gift after his death to the Masonic Education and Charity Trust for whatever purpose Grand Master Edgar W. Darling deemed most critically in need of support. The $200,000 grant was used to construct a chapel at the Home. Various Masonic-related organizations have sponsored stained-glass windows for the chapel. Among the more recent changes are an expansion of the original building for an administrative wing and the conversion of an auditorium to a lodge room. Ground was broken in 2004 for the construction of apartments and cottages for independent living. The development also included a provision for an assisted living unit to provide for various levels of care as needed. Residents began to move into the new quarters in 2006.

== Library & museum ==
With the 1815 acquisition of a collection of Masonic books owned by R.W. and Rev. Thaddeus Mason Harris, the Grand Lodge had the beginnings of what would become one of the major Masonic libraries in the world. Rev. Harris was the first to hold the title of Grand Chaplain. By 1850, there were provisions for a standing committee to oversee a library, but the 1864 fire slowed the collection process. A number of Grand Masters in the late 19th century were considered strong Masonic scholars and were influential in building the collection. It was not until 1930, however, that steps were taken to organize the growing collection. M.W. Melvin M. Johnson and others convinced J. Hugo Tatsch to come to Boston. Tatsch had developed a Masonic library classification system at the Iowa Masonic Library, and he put that system in place in Boston. Tatsch was amazed at the wealth of unique material he was able to uncover. When he died in 1939, his widow donated more than 1,000 items from his personal library. Tatsch's assistant was Muriel Davis, who later became Mrs. Earl W. Taylor, wife of the Grand Secretary. Upon Tatsch's death, she took over the duties in the library until her retirement in 1968. In 1993, the library was formally named in honor of Samuel Crocker Lawrence, a Civil War general who was Grand Master in 1881–83. Lawrence had left his extensive collection to the library in 1911. His material included a valuable Enoch T. Carson collection. In addition to the books and periodicals, the Grand Lodge was a repository for many intriguing artifacts. In 1800, the Grand Lodge had requested from Martha Washington a lock of hair from the late George Washington. When she complied, Paul Revere created a golden urn for the hair. A similar request was made of Mrs. Garfield following the assassination of President and Brother James A. Garfield in 1882. In 1887, a committee recommended the formation of a Grand Lodge museum. One of the first items for the museum was a copy of the Warren family coat of arms presented by Joseph Warren Lodge in Boston. As the collection grew, many of the items were put on display on the second floor of the Grand Lodge building. Concerned about the proper preservation of the historical items, Grand Master Donald G. Hicks negotiated with the Scottish Rite Supreme Council's National Heritage Museum in Lexington to transfer the items from Boston on permanent loan. The collection was eventually transferred in 2004. The Grand Lodge library was then relocated from the third floor of the Boston building to the vacated area on the second floor.

== 250th anniversary onwards ==
The 250th anniversary of the Grand Lodge in 1983 was marked by a host of events. M.W. Donald W. Vose served as chairman for the anniversary committee. A special communication of the Grand Lodge was held at Tokyo, Japan, on March 15, 1983, for the purpose of a Grand Master's visit to Sinim Lodge. In 1994, Grand Lodge instituted a scholarship program for children of Massachusetts Mason who are high school graduates enrolled in accredited colleges. Upon the 1995 recommendation of the Foreign Relations Committee, the Prince Hall Grand Lodge of Massachusetts was recognized as being “regular” following a similar recognition by the United Grand Lodge of England. A study committee in 1947 had made the same recommendation, but the action caused concern among other Grand Lodges. When Florida and Texas withdrew recognition from Massachusetts, the matter was referred back to a committee. In 1949 it was voted to rescind the 1947 vote “to avoid disharmony in American Freemasonry.” At the regular communication following the 1995 decision, the Grand Master welcomed the Grand Master and officers of the Most Worshipful Prince Hall Grand Lodge of Massachusetts. At a special communication on July 4, 1995, M.W. David W. Lovering (Grand Master 1993–1995), Grand Lodge officers and members marched from the Old State House to the current State House to relay the cornerstone, which was originally laid by M.W. Paul Revere on July 4, 1795. The trowel that was symbolically used was one that had been made by Paul Revere. A new program known as the Masonic Angel Fund was established in 1998 by members of Universal Lodge in Orleans, and an accredited charitable foundation was approved in 2000. Other lodges soon adopted the program, working under the established foundation. Participating lodges work through a local school district to provide money to assist needy children with the purchase of winter clothing, eye exams, glasses or other items when a need is identified by a school administrator. To strengthen the bond with Prince Hall Masons, the officers of the two Grand Lodges visited the Old Granary and Copp's Hill burial grounds on May 10, 2005. During the visits, two ashlars were dedicated, one at Paul Revere's grave and the other at the grave of Prince Hall. The Grand Lodge of Massachusetts has always had a strong relationship with the Bunker Hill monument. At the 1775 battle itself Grand Master Joseph Warren lost his life. In his memory King Solomon's Lodge in Charlestown erected an 18-foot (5.5 m) monument on Bunker Hill in 1794. When the Bunker Hill Monument Association was established in 1823, the lodge turned over the land and monument to the association. Several years later a larger monument was planned and the Grand Lodge laid the cornerstone with the Marquis de Lafayette in attendance. The original monument is still visible inside the base of the newer structure. The Grand Lodge was invited to participate in the 100th anniversary celebration of the Battle of Bunker Hill. For the occasion, Grand Master Percival Lowell Everett wore an apron once owned by Joseph Warren, and the acting Deputy Grand Master, Dr. Winslow Lewis, wore the apron that had been worn by General Lafayette at the 1825 cornerstone-laying. Today the monument is under the supervision of the National Park Service. The Grand Lodge donated $500,000 in 2003 to assist with the restoration of the monument. The project included a new museum on Monument Square overlooking the historic site. The monument restoration and the museum were completed in 2007.
