= Lomasney =

Lomasney is an Irish surname (Ó Loimeasna or Ó Lomasnaigh). Notable people with the surname include:

- Martin Lomasney (1859–1933), Massachusetts politician
- Steve Lomasney (born 1977), baseball catcher
- William Mackey Lomasney (1841–1884), member of the Fenian Brotherhood

== See also ==
- 42 Lomasney Way, tenement in Boston
