= West End Museum =

Museum in Boston, United States

Coordinates: 42.3647°N 71.0642°W

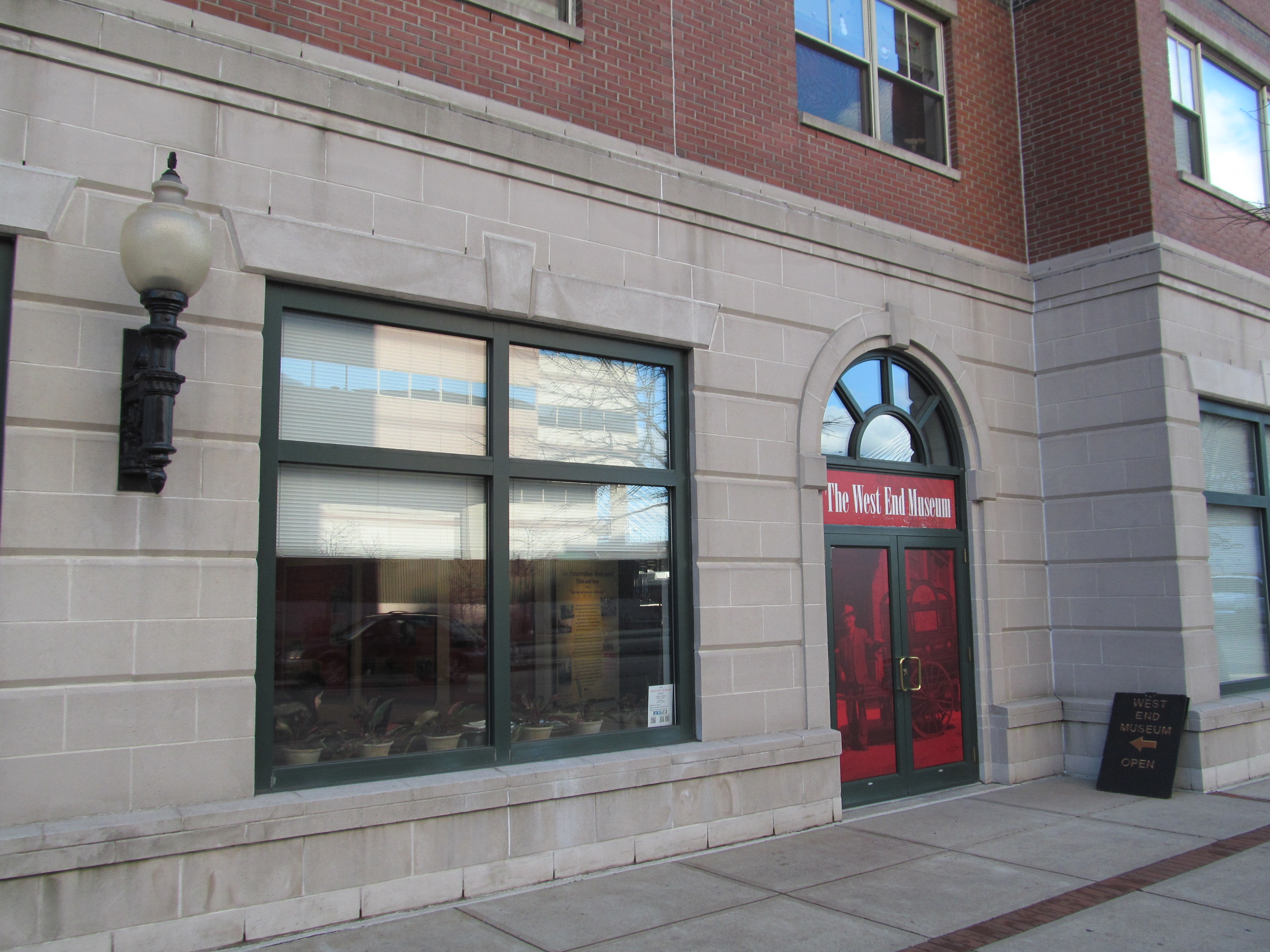
West End Museum entrance

The West End Museum (WEM) is a neighborhood museum dedicated to the collection, preservation, and interpretation of the history and culture of the West End of Boston in Boston, Massachusetts, United States.

== History ==
In 1989, the editors of the West Ender Newsletter and members of the West End Historical Association developed a preliminary plan for a West End Museum. In 1991, The Old West End Housing Corporation (OWEHC) was formed as a Community Development Corporation (CDC) with the mission of developing affordable housing for former West End residents who had been displaced by the Urban Renewal programs of the 1950s, when their houses were seized by eminent domain. After helping to develop affordable housing for former West Enders at West End Place (150 Staniford Street, Boston, MA 02114), in 2002 the OWEHC was awarded a commercial space for its offices along with the stipulation that it develop a West End Visitor Center.

In 2003, the Bostonian Society donated and relocated its The Last Tenement exhibit to 150 Staniford St. This was an exhibition which had been displayed in the Old State House from October 1992 through April 1994, portraying the plight of the West End neighborhood. The exhibit laid the foundation for a permanent West End Museum. In 2010, members of the OWEHC along with West End residents formed a committee with the goal to establish a permanent 501(c) 3 non-profit called "The West End Museum, Inc".

== Exhibition space and programs ==
The museum space consists of three exhibition areas and an archive. The museum hosts regular programming, including gallery openings, film screenings, book signings, and special guest appearances.

The permanent exhibit The Last Tenement, designed by the Bostonian Society in 1992 and relocated to the West End Museum in 2003, is housed in its own dedicated 1,100-square-foot (100 m^{2}) space. A larger temporary exhibition 1,400-square-foot (130 m^{2}) space accommodates 3 temporary shows per year. Shows have included: The Middlesex Canal: Boston's First Big Dig and Leaving the River. The Members' Gallery adjacent to the administrative offices hosts six temporary shows each year. Past shows in this space have included: West End photographs from the archives of the Bostonian Society, The Boston Canal (which was an extension of the Middlesex Canal through Causeway Street in the Bulfinch Triangle to Haymarket Square), and Twenty Five Years of the West Ender Newsletter.
