= Guenter Loeser Memorial Award =

The Guenter Loeser Memorial Award was first established in 1955 at the Air Force Cambridge Research Laboratory. It was named after Dr. Loeser, a meteorologist who lost his life while conducting a field experiment. Over time, AFCRL became the Air Force Geophysics Laboratory at Hanscom Air Force Base and has now become the Air Force Research Laboratory Space Vehicles Directorate Battlespace Environment Laboratory, AFRL/RVB, at Kirtland Air Force Base.

The award is presented annually by the Air Force Research Laboratory (at Kirtland Air Force Base since 2011) for an outstanding research contribution. Recipients present a lecture on a topic of scientific interest.

== Winners ==
Year	Winner
1955	Jean I. F. King
1956	Robert G. Breene, Jr.
1957	David Atlas
1958	Rita C. Sagalyn
1959	Norman A. Haskell
1960	Hans Hinteregger
1961	Yoshio Tanaka
1962	Kenneth S. W. Champion, Robert A. Mapleton
1963	Herman Yagoda
1964	Jules Aarons
1965	Allan C. Shell
1966	Hari K. Sen
1967	John W. Evans
1968	Robert E. Huffman
1969	John W. Salisbury
1970	Rocco S. Narcisi
1971	Norman W. Rosenberg
1972	Leon J. Heroux
1973	Paul H. Carr
1974	A.T. Stair, Jr.
1975	Edward A. Burke
1976	Robert A. McClatchey
1977	William Swider
1978	George Vanasse
1979	Ralph Shapiro
1980	Donald H. Eckhardt
1981	Randall E. Murphy
1982	Edmond Murad
1983	George W. Simon
1984	John R. Jasperse
1985	Don F. Smart, Margaret Shea
1986	John F. Paulson
1987	David A. Hardy
1988	William J. Burke
1989	Herbert C. Carlson
1990	Nelson C. Maynard
1991	Donald Neidig
1992	John A. Klobuchar
1993	M. Susan Gussenhoven
1994	E. Gary Mullen
1995	Laurence Rothman
1996	Albert A. Viggiano
1997	David N. Anderson
1998	Ernest R. Huppi
1999	Stephan D. Price
2000	Edmond M. Dewan
2001	Ramesh D. Sharma
2002	Rainer A. Dressler
2003	Edward W. Cliver
2004	Frederick J. Rich
2005	Frank Marcos
2006	Santimay Basu
2007	Bamandas Basu
2008	Greg Ginet
2009	Steve Kahler
2010	Anton Dainty
2011	
2012	Evgeny Mishin
2013	Dale Ferguson
2014	Todd Pedersen, Nicholas Shuman
2015	Cheryl Huang
2016	Jay Albert

== See also ==
- List of geophysics awards

== Bibliography ==
- Chronology: From the Air Force Geophysics Laboratory to the Geophysics Directorate, Phillips Laboratory, 1985–1995; Ruth P. Liebowitz, Evelyn M. Kindler, 26 September 1995. Phillips Laboratory Special Reports, No. 275. PL-TR-95-2134.
