= Margaret Shea =

Margaret Shea may refer to:

- Margaret Shea (sailor) (born 1989), American sailor
- Margaret Shea (scientist), space scientist
