= Jules Aarons =

American space physicist

- Born: October 3, 1921; Bronx, New York, U.S.
- Died: November 21, 2008 (aged 87); Newton, Massachusetts, U.S.
- Education: City College of New York; Boston University; University of Paris
- Known for: Physics, Photography

Jules Aarons (October 3, 1921 – November 21, 2008) was an American space physicist known for his study of radio-wave propagation, and a photographer known for his street photography in Boston.

== Early life and education ==
Aarons was born in the Bronx, New York City, where his father worked in the garment industry. He graduated from the City College of New York in 1942. During World War II he served in the Army Signal Corps. He studied physics at Boston University, earning his M.S. degree in 1949. In 1953 he won a Fulbright scholarship and earned his Ph.D. at the University of Paris.

== Physics ==
From 1948 to 1981 Aarons worked as a senior scientist at the Air Force Geophysics Research Laboratory at Hanscom Field, where his research helped to improve satellite and global positioning technology. Sunanda Basu of the National Science Foundation described Aarons as "a pioneer in beacon satellite studies of the ionosphere" whose name "has now become synonymous with the field of ionospheric scintillations." Having worked with many European scientists while studying in Paris, in 1957 he formed the Joint Satellite Studies Group, an international group of scientists who studied atmospheric effects on satellite signals. This group eventually expanded to become the Beacon Satellite Studies (BSS) Group, which still holds biannual meetings around the world. Early on, he encouraged his BSS colleagues to set up numerous ionospheric monitoring stations, which later proved useful to the Air Force in designing its space-based communication and navigation systems. The group's research laid the groundwork for ionospheric space-weather studies.

In 1981 Aarons became a research professor in the astronomy department at Boston University, and in 1987 helped to establish the university's Center for Space Physics. While at B.U. he researched the effects of magnetic storms on the equatorial and high-latitude ionosphere using GPS satellites. He published over a hundred scientific papers in the course of his career, and edited a book about scintillation phenomena.

=== Honors and awards ===
- Fulbright scholarship, 1953
- Air Force Exceptional Civil Service Award
- Townsend Harris Medal, City College of New York
- Guenter Loeser Memorial Award, 1964
- Fellow of the Institute of Electrical and Electronics Engineers (IEEE), 1975
- Chairman of the Electromagnetic Propagation Panel, AGARD-NATO, 1979-1981
- Chairman of the Commission on Ionospheric Radio Wave Propagation, International Union of Radio Science, 1980-1983
- Harry Diamond Memorial Award, IEEE
- Appleton Lecturer Award, IEEE, 1996

=== Publications ===
As editor:

- Radio Astronomical and Satellite Studies of the Atmosphere. Amsterdam: North-Holland Publishing Company. 1963.

As author:

- Solar System Radio Astronomy: Lectures Presented at the NATO Advanced Study Institute of the National Observatory of Athens (1965). Plenum Press.
- High Latitude Models, Observations, and Analysis of Ionospheric Scintillations (1973). Air Force Cambridge Research Lab.
- The Effects of Magnetic Storm Phases on F-Layer Irregularities from Auroral to Equatorial Latitudes (1989). Boston University Center for Space Physics.

== Photography ==
Boy in Front of Girls, North End, 1955, by Aarons

Aarons first became interested in photography as a youth, taking pictures of his family in Rockaway, New York. Later, while pursuing his college degrees and working as a scientist, he continued to develop his craft, taking his camera with him on business trips around the world. He is best known for his photographs of Boston's ethnically diverse West End and predominantly Italian North End neighborhoods, taken during the late 1940s and early 1950s. Much of the West End was razed in the late 1950s as part of a large-scale urban renewal project, making Aarons's photographs of the area especially important for historical purposes; the Boston Public Library has an extensive collection of his work.

As a street photographer he was influenced by Sid Grossman, Lisette Model, Henri Cartier-Bresson and Brassaï. His work has also been compared to that of Helen Levitt and Leon Levinstein. He took informal photos of people in public places, often without their knowledge. Unlike many of his contemporaries, Aarons chose not to focus on the lives of the downtrodden, writing in his notes: "I resolved to capture the day-to-day life experiences of the people, avoiding scenes of poverty." His street scenes are often lively and vibrant, populated by ordinary people who are portrayed with dignity, evincing a fundamentally humane outlook. He was keenly interested in the way people presented themselves in public: often with flair, as in Boy in Front of Girls, North End, 1955 (shown), in which a young man, presumably Italian-American, strikes a dramatic pose for the camera.

Unlike many other street photographers, he opted for a twin-lens reflex camera (Ciro-flex, and later a Rolleiflex) rather than a 35 mm camera. Shooting from waist level rather than eye level made him less conspicuous, and therefore less likely to intrude on the candid scenes. Even more than his subjects and composition, it was his printing skill that distinguished him as a photographer. He kept a darkroom in the basement of his home, which was featured in an episode of This Old House in 2010; a segment of the show was devoted to his photography.

His photographs are included in the collections of the Museum of Modern Art, the Bibliothèque Nationale de France, the Boston Museum of Fine Arts, the Rhode Island School of Design Museum, the DeCordova Museum, the Bostonian Society, and the Boston Public Library, and have been exhibited at the Boston Institute of Contemporary Art, the Boston University Art Gallery, the West End Museum, the Bronx Museum of the Arts, the Galerie Agathe Gaillard (Paris), the Florida Museum of Photographic Arts, the Danforth Museum, the Underground Gallery (NYC), and other venues.

=== Exhibitions ===
- Black Boston: Documentary Photography and the African American Experience. Boston University Art Gallery, 1995.
- Jules Aarons: In the Jewish Neighborhoods, 1946-76. DeCordova Museum, 2009.
- Man in the Street: Jules Aarons Photographs Boston, 1947-1976. Boston Public Library, 2010.
- Life in the West End 1947-1953: The Photography of Jules Aarons. West End Museum, 2013.
- Three Photographers From the Bronx: Jules Aarons, Morton Broffman and Joe Conzo. Bronx Museum of Art, 2015.

=== Publications ===
Collections:

- Shavelson, Michael B., ed. (1999). Jules Aarons: Photographs of Paris 1953-1968. Boston, MA: French Library and Cultural Center.
- Schmidt, Aaron, ed. (1999). Into the streets, 1947-1976: Photographs of Boston. Boston, MA: Boston Public Library.
- Margolis, Bernard, ed. (2002). Provincetown, 1949-1965 A Photographic Memoir by Jules Aarons. Boston, MA: Boston Public Library. ISBN 978-0890731239
- Sichel, Kim, ed. (2003). Jules Aarons: Street Portraits 1946-1976. Boston, MA: Charles River Publishing. ISBN 978-1891024719
- Melton, Julie, ed. (2006). Public Spaces, Private Moments: The Photographs of Jules Aarons. Boston, MA: Gallery Kayafas.

History books and anthologies:

- Kay, Jane Holtz (1980). Lost Boston. Houghton Mifflin. ISBN 9780395276099
- Fisher, Sean M. (1992). The Last Tenement: Confronting Community and Urban Renewal in Boston's West End. Bostonian Society. ISBN 9780934865005
- Sarna, Jonathan D. (1995). The Jews of Boston. Combined Jewish Philanthropies of Greater Boston. ISBN 978-1555532178
- Conway, Lorie (1996). Boston the Way It Was: Pictures and Memories from the 30s and 40s. WGBH Boston. ISBN 978-1884738890
- Lafo, Rachel Rosenfield (2000). Photography in Boston 1955-1985. The MIT Press. ISBN 978-0262122290

== Personal life ==
Aarons married Jeannette Lampert in 1944 and had two sons, Philip and Herbert. He died at his home in Newton, Massachusetts on November 21, 2008.
