= West End, Boston =

Neighborhood of Boston, Massachusetts

West End
- Neighborhood of Boston
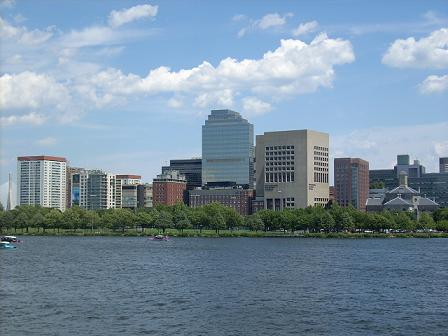
- 2007 view from the west, with former Charles Street Jail buildings at right
- Interactive map of West End
- Country: United States
- State: Massachusetts
- County: Suffolk
- Neighborhood of: Boston
- Time zone: UTC-5 (Eastern)
- Area code: 617 / 857

The West End is a neighborhood of Boston, Massachusetts, United States, bounded generally by Cambridge Street to the south, the Charles River to the west and northwest, North Washington Street on the north and northeast, and New Sudbury Street on the east. Beacon Hill is to the south, North Point (Cambridge, Massachusetts) is across the Charles River to the north, Kendall Square is in Cambridge across the Charles River to the west, and the North End of Boston is to the east.

A late 1950s urban renewal project razed a large Italian and Jewish enclave and displaced over 20,000 people in order to redevelop much of the West End and part of the neighboring Downtown neighborhood. After that, the original West End became increasingly non-residential, including part of Government Center (formerly Scollay Square) as well as much of Massachusetts General Hospital and several high rise office buildings. More recently, however, new residential buildings and spaces, as well as new parks, have been appearing across the West End.

== Geography ==
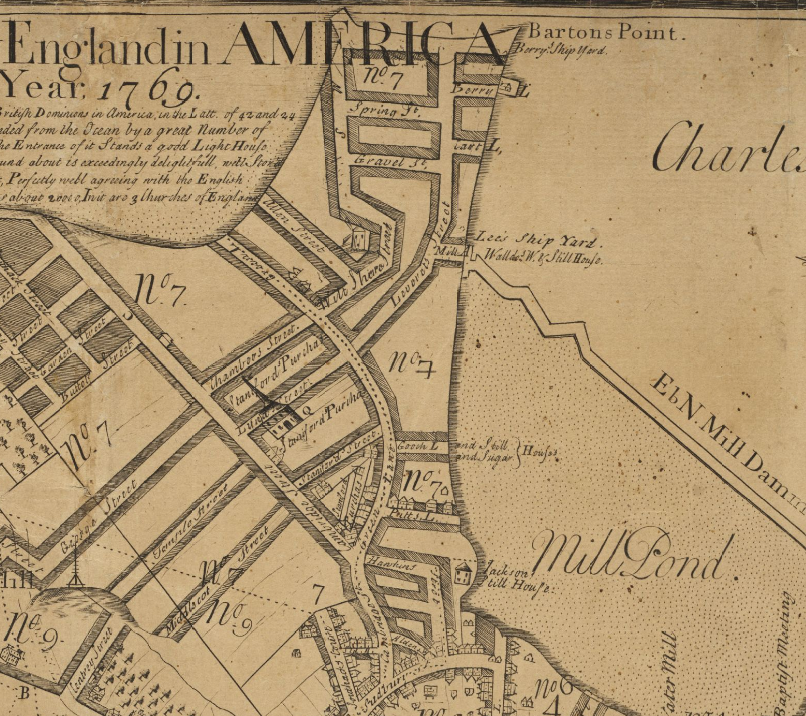
West End, c. 1769

The West End occupies the northwest portion of the Shawmut Peninsula. Much of the land on which the neighborhood lies is the product of land reclamation. Beginning in 1807, parts of Beacon Hill were used to fill in a small bay and mill pond that separated Beacon Hill and the West End from the North End. Today the neighborhood consists primarily of superblocks containing high rise residential towers. The West End borders the Charles River between the Longfellow Bridge and the Charles River Dam Bridge. The Charlesbank Playground runs along the bank of the river, but is separated from the rest of the neighborhood by Storrow Drive, a large crosstown expressway.

== Early days ==
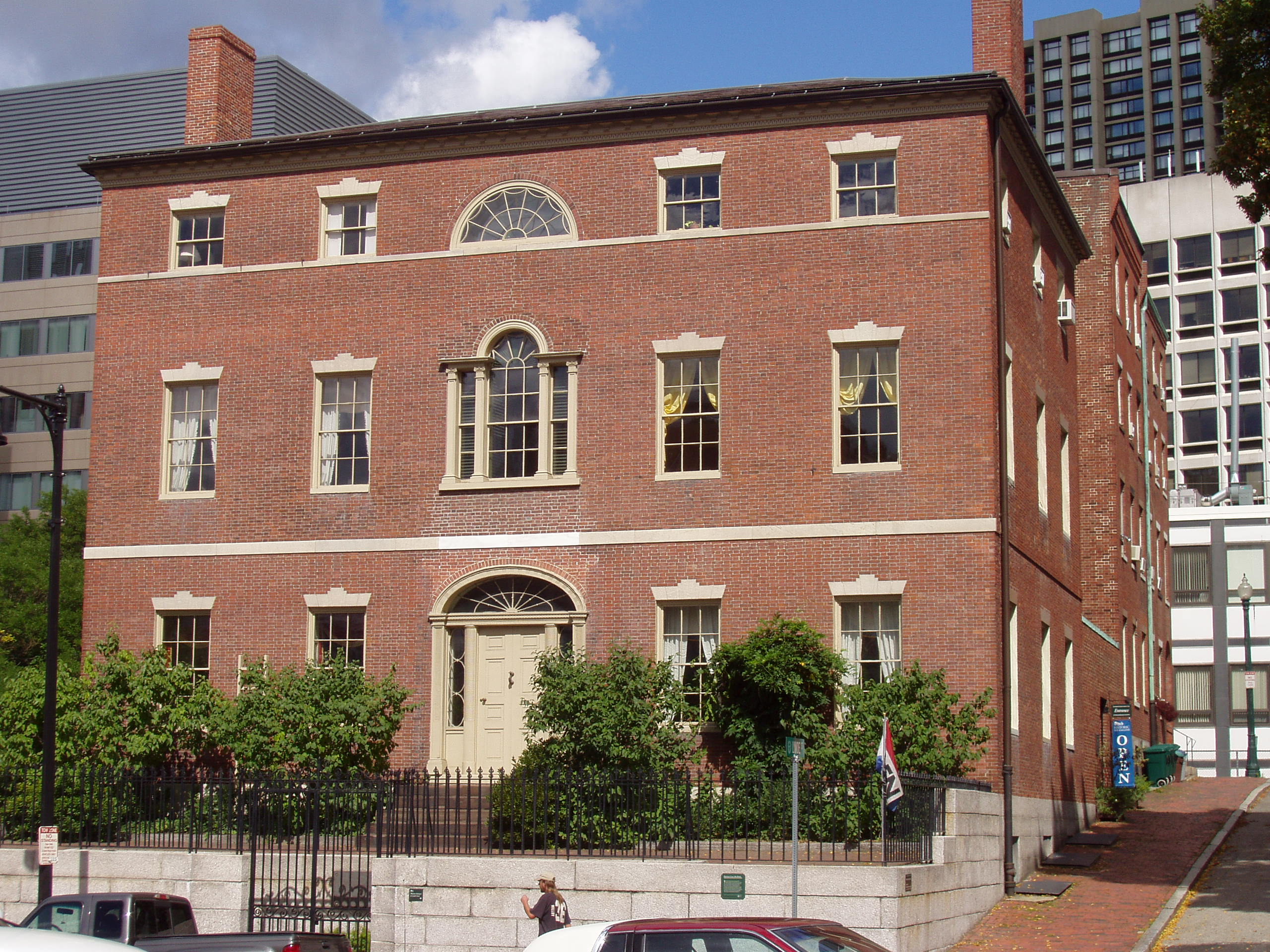
The first house Charles Bulfinch designed for Harrison Gray Otis in the West End.

In the late 18th and early 19th centuries, Boston's waterfront and North End were becoming overcrowded, and many of the city's well off residents took the opportunity to develop the area now known as the West End. At that time, the area was separated from the older neighborhoods by a small bay. The architect Charles Bulfinch was responsible for much of Boston's architectural character at the time, and played a large part in this new development of the West End.

Bulfinch spent much of his early career in the 1790s designing mansions, many of them in the West End and other Boston neighborhoods. One of the most famous examples of these was the first Harrison Gray Otis House. This historic building was the first of three that Bulfinch designed for the affluent lawyer Harrison Gray Otis, and is one of the few buildings that survived Urban Renewal in the West End.

Other West End landmarks designed by Bulfinch were the Massachusetts General Hospital's domed granite building, built 1816–1825 (today known as the Bulfinch Pavilion), and the West End Market on the corner of Grove and Cambridge Streets. Constructed in 1810, this historic market did not survive the area's redevelopment in the 1950s. Bulfinch's architecture of newer large brick buildings with gardens attracted many of Boston's wealthier citizens. By 1810, the West End was inhabited by wealthy business men, merchants, and lawyers. Many would soon move to the nearby Beacon Hill, turning the West End into an African American community and stopping point for new immigrants.

Another early West End building is the Charles Street Jail (1851), designed by Gridley James Fox Bryant, which was renovated into the Liberty Hotel.

=== West End House ===
The West End House was originally founded in 1906 as a community center for young immigrant boys. The community center's founding was funded by Boston-area philanthropist and investment banker James J. Storrow. The West End House served as a center for social and community life in Boston's West End neighborhood for over 60 years, opening its doors to young immigrant boys from a myriad of different ethnic and national backgrounds. The urban renewal plans of the 1950s and 1960s, which saw the near complete upheaval of the original West End neighborhood, negatively affected the community center's membership since much of the neighborhood's immigrant population was subsequently displaced. In 1971, thanks in large part to the fundraising efforts of alumni of the original West End House, the West End House was relocated to Allston-Brighton and reimagined into a modernized co-ed center for youth development with a focus on the arts, academics, athletics, and leadership.

== Ethnic history ==
=== African American history ===
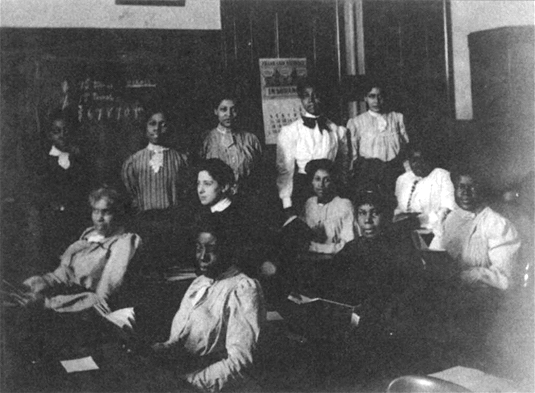
West End Adult Evening School, c. 1890s; photo by A.H. Folsom (Boston Public Library)

In the early 19th century the West End, along with Beacon Hill's north slope, became an important center of Boston's African American community. The mostly affluent and white inhabitants of Beacon Hill's south slope were strongly supportive of abolitionism. This encouraged middle and working class free African Americans to move into the nearby North slope and West End. After the Civil War, the West End continued to be an important center of African American culture. It was one of the few locations in the United States at the time where African Americans had a political voice. At least one black resident from the West End sat on Boston's community council during every year between 1876 and 1895.

=== Immigration ===
From the second half of the 19th century to the mid-20th century, Boston's West End became a home to many different immigrant groups. The wealthy and middle class business men were almost entirely gone, but many African Americans remained in the neighborhood, making it one of Boston's most diverse. Among the many immigrant groups contributing to this melting pot were Armenians, Greeks, Irish, Lebanese, Italians, Jews, Lithuanians, Poles, Russians, Syrians, Ukrainians and many other Eastern Europeans and Southern Europeans. It was during this period that the neighborhood's population reached its peak at approximately 23,000 residents

As a result of this immigration, the religious make-up of the neighborhood changed dramatically. Protestant churches moved away or shut down, to be replaced by Catholic churches and synagogues. For example, the old West Church, built in 1806 closed in 1892 due to lack of congregation. It reopened two years later as a library to better serve the new community.

==== Irish ====
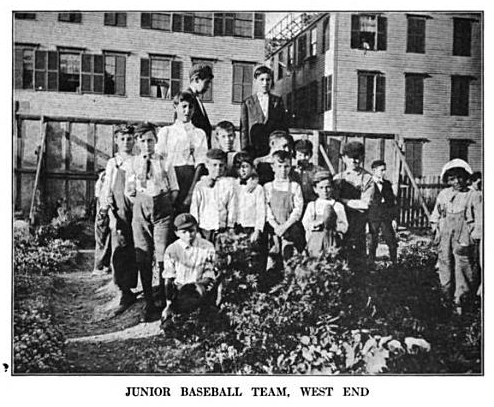
Junior baseball team, West End, 1915

Irish immigrants were among the first to settle the West End. After briefly passing through the North End, many Irish families moved on to the West and South ends. The West End soon developed a thriving Irish community.

Later on, this community became associated with Martin Lomasney. Lomasney, also known as "the Mahatma", was the ward boss of Boston's Ward 8 located in the West End. He was well known for taking care of the community that had developed there, especially the Irish families.

Early in Lomasney's career, he established the Hendricks Club in the heart of the neighborhood. The Hendricks began as a social club and gathering place, but later turned into the center of Lomasney's political machine. It was from here that he began to provide social services, charity, and shelter for poor immigrants. In return, he was able to drum up votes and support from much of the neighborhood.

==== Jewish community ====
By the late 19th and early 20th centuries, the Irish immigration had slowed and Eastern European Jews began to immigrate into the West End in large numbers. Many came to escape persecution in Lithuania, Russia, and Poland. They formed a community in the West End and became a significant part of the population by 1910. They made their home in the neighborhood, constructing health centers, libraries, labor unions, loan societies, orphanages, and synagogues. Actor Leonard Nimoy was raised in this community.

The new Boston Synagogue, the 1919 Vilna Shul, and the African Meeting House which was the home of Anshi Lubuvicher from 1900 to 1972 are the only surviving West End synagogues. The Boston Synagogue is a newly merged congregation; the Vilna Shul at 16 Philips Street, which was outside the urban renewal demolition area, is now a synagogue museum, and the African American Meeting House is now a church museum. Over the Vilna Shul's ark is the double hand symbol for the Kohanim, the ancient Israelite priests, which was the source for the Star Trek Vulcan salute. The Vilna Shul also has pews salvaged from the former Twelfth Baptist Church on which once sat former African American slaves and volunteers in the 54th Massachusetts Infantry Regiment popularized by the movie Glory. The Vilna was the last of the approximately seven West End synagogues to stay open, closing in 1985.

== Urban renewal ==
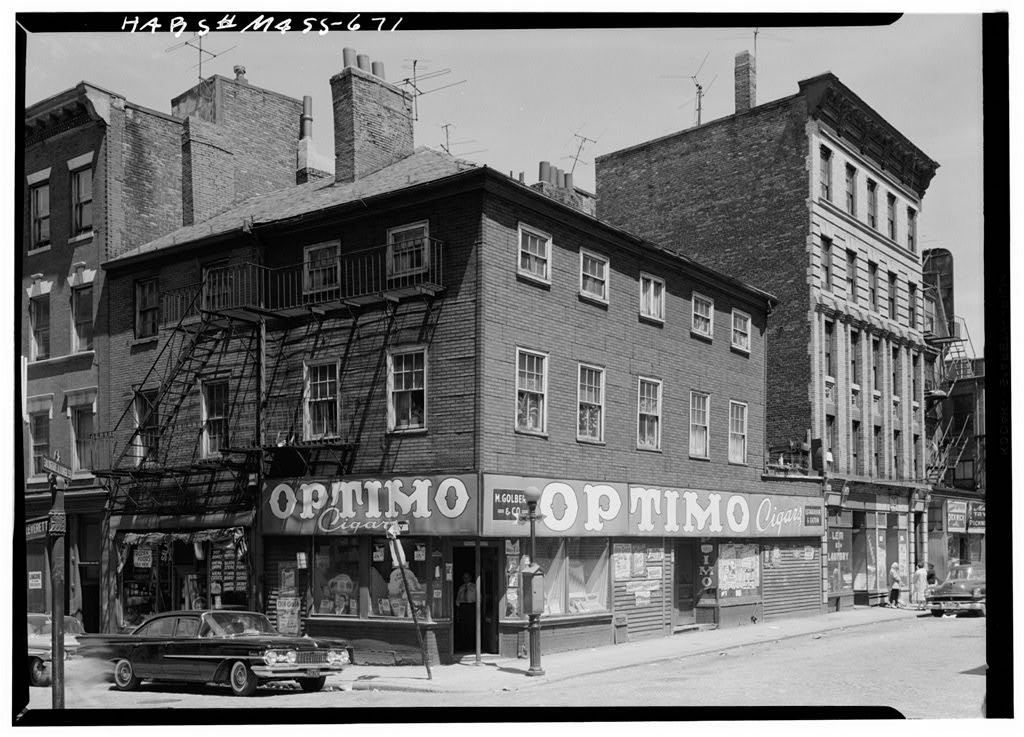
Green Street, 1959

By the 1950s, Boston's West End had turned into a working poor residential area with scattered businesses with small meandering roads much like the North End. According to most residents, the West End was a good place to live at this time. The once overcrowded neighborhood was in the process of "deslumming" and the population had dropped to around 7,500 residents. By the end of the 1950s, over half of the neighborhood would be completely leveled to be replaced with residential high rises as part of a large scale urban renewal project.

=== Political background ===
The large-scale renewal of the West End was first proposed in the 1930s by Nathan Strauss Jr., among others, shortly after the National Housing Act of 1934 was passed. The neighborhood was considered a slum by wealthy Bostonians who did not live there. The working class residents of the West End felt strong ties to the community and so the plan would not become politically feasible until the 1950s.

When the John B. Hynes administration came into power in 1949 city officials recognized that the federal government's Housing Act of 1949 presented the opportunity to remake parts of Boston. The Boston Housing Authority (BHA) held responsibility for developing Boston's urban renewal plans and was designated the city's local public authority for federal funds.

=== Implementation ===
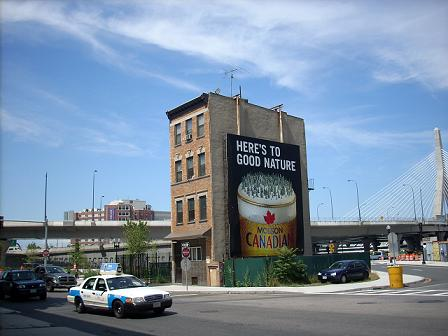
One of the few buildings (known as "The Last Tenement House") to survive the urban renewal of Boston's West End, 42 Lomasney Way, stands in one of the Super Blocks that was created by that project

As part of a plan to create a "New Boston", the Boston Housing Authority (BHA) and its 1957 successor, the Boston Redevelopment Authority (BRA), redeveloped neighborhoods throughout the 1950s and 1960s. The New York Streets section of the South End was redeveloped before the West End, and in the 1960s Scollay Square was leveled to create the brutalist Government Center afterwards. The motivation behind these projects was to replace neighborhoods that had been classified as slums with neighborhoods that would bring in increased tax revenues. It is estimated that before the renewal project, the tax revenue from the West End was approximately $546,000 a year.

The redevelopment of the West End was officially announced on April 11, 1953. Mayor Hynes and the BHA stated that the project would be beneficial to the neighborhood. The West End's narrow streets were a fire hazard and many of the buildings were not up to code, with approximately 80% of them substandard or marginal. Tenants were assured that affordable housing would be found for them, and many were led to believe that they would be able to move back into the West End after the project was complete.

The plan involved completely leveling a 46-acre (190,000 m^{2}) portion of the West End, displacing 2,700 families to make way for five residential high rise complexes that would contain only 477 apartments. The new development was aimed towards upper middle class residents: most of those displaced would not be able to afford to return.

In October 1957, the BRA held a hearing on the new project. At least 200 West End residents attended and the consensus was overwhelmingly opposed to the plan. The Save the West End committee was formed with the support of Joseph Lee to organize protests against the new development. Most residents believed that the project would not be realized, and so did not act until it was too late.

Residents received their eviction letters on April 25, 1958. The BRA used the Housing Act of 1949 to raze the West End to the ground. Working-class families were displaced, and superblocks replaced the original street layout. The result was a neighborhood consisting of residential high rises, shopping centers and parking lots.

=== Controversy ===
Population of the West End, 1910–1950
Year	W. End	Boston
1910	22,656	670,585
1920	18,442	748,060
1930	13,454	781,188
1940	12,879	770,816
1950	11,731	801,444

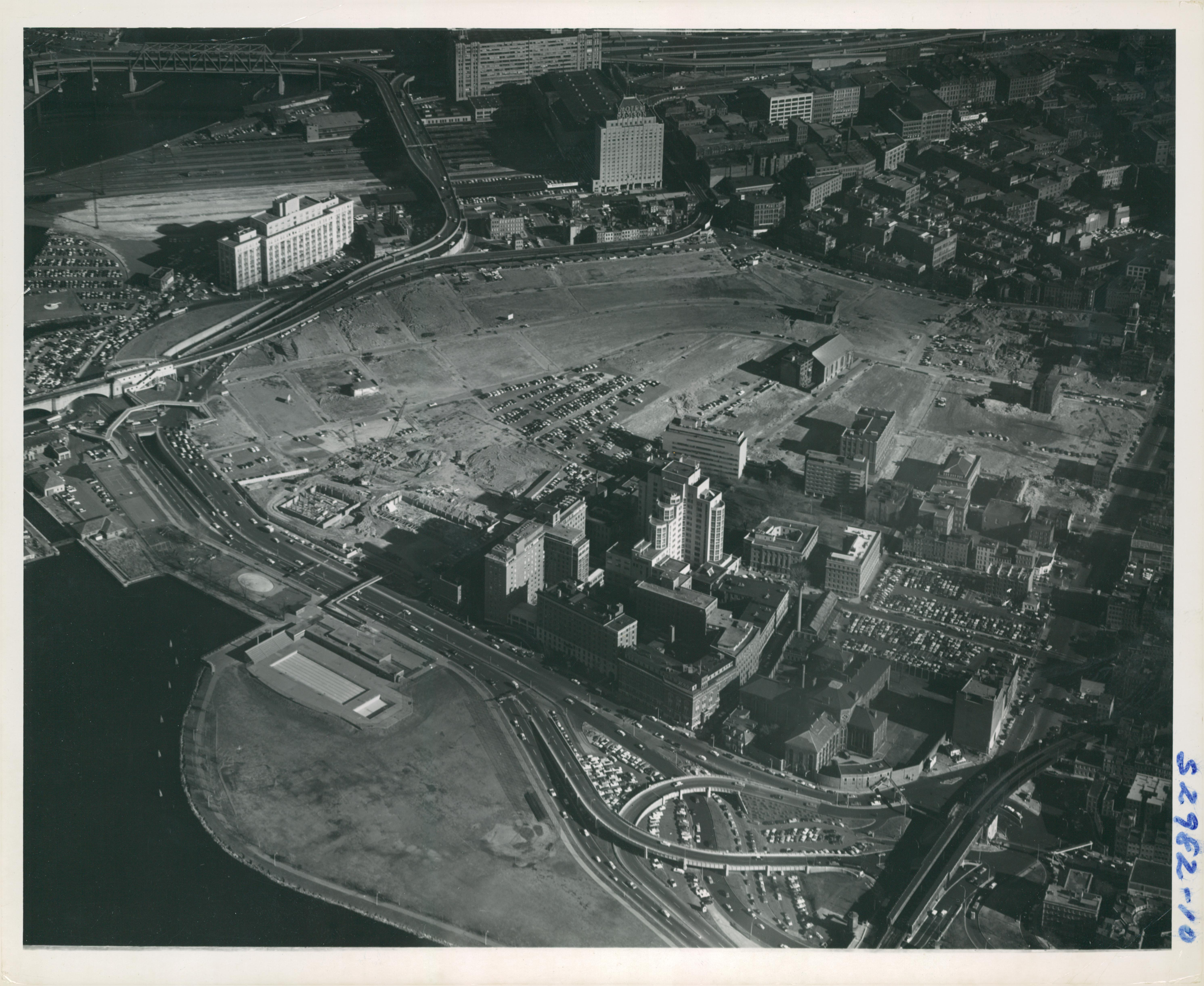
West End project area looking northeasterly, circa 1959–1964

The urban renewal of the West End has been criticized for its destruction of a neighborhood and its careless implementation. One of the main criticisms of the project is that the neighborhood was not considered a slum by the residents, and instead had a strong sense of community. A later mayor of Boston, Ray Flynn, described the West End as "a typical neighborhood" and "not blighted." The perception of the neighborhood as a slum was mostly held by wealthy outsiders and was enhanced by city policy. For example, the city stopped collecting garbage and cleaning the streets, leaving the neighborhood a mess. A photographer for a local newspaper was even assigned to go to the West End, overturn a trashcan, and take a picture of it to create the impression of a blighted neighborhood.

Many building owners were not adequately compensated for their property. Due to city law, as soon as tenement buildings were condemned by the BRA, the city became the legal owner. This meant that building owners had no income as rent was paid directly to the city. Soon owners became desperate to sell their property at severely reduced prices.

The justification for razing the West End has also been called into question. Some say that, as one of the neighborhoods that supported the former mayor, it was in the political sights of the Hynes administration. The entire net cost of the project was $15.8 million, not including the additional loss of tax dollars for the years that the West End was vacant. It is uncertain as to whether the increased tax revenue would ever be enough to justify the costs.

The negative effect of urban renewal on the former residents of the West End has been well documented. Between one quarter and one half of the former residents were relocated to substandard housing with higher rents than they were previously paying. Approximately 40% also suffer from severe long term grief reactions. Many former residents share their memories and grief through the West Ender Newsletter, published with the tag line, "Printed in the Spirit of the Mid-Town Journal and Dedicated to Being the Collective Conscience of Urban Renewal and Eminent Domain in the City of Boston." The destruction of the West End community led to a strong distaste for urban renewal in Boston. In 2015, Boston Redevelopment Authority director Brian P. Golden officially apologized for the demolition of the neighborhood.

== Present day ==
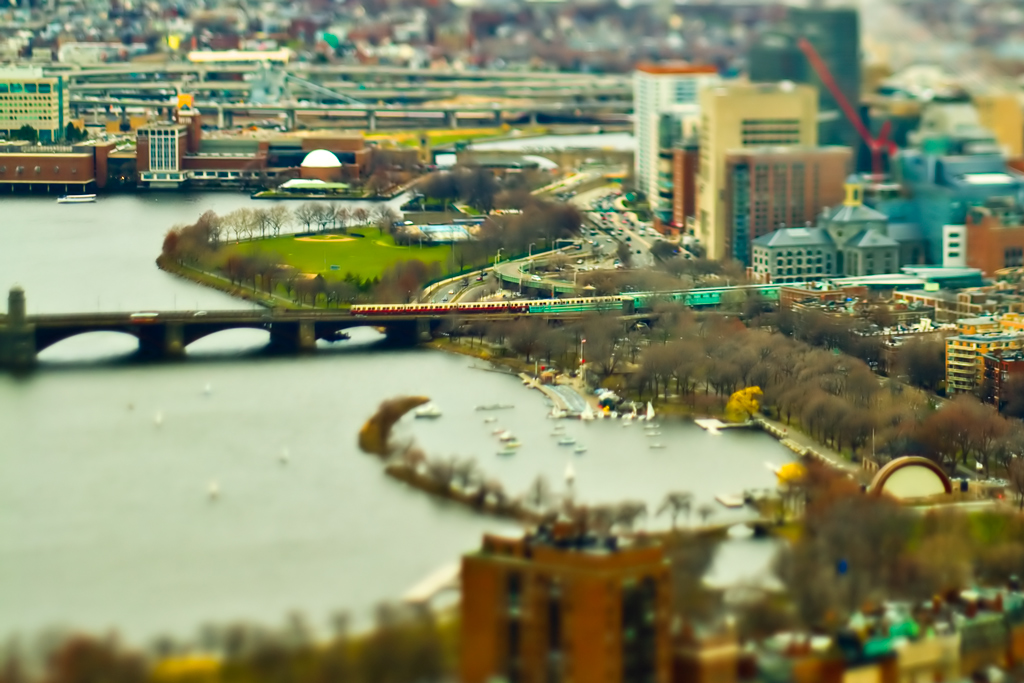
2009 view

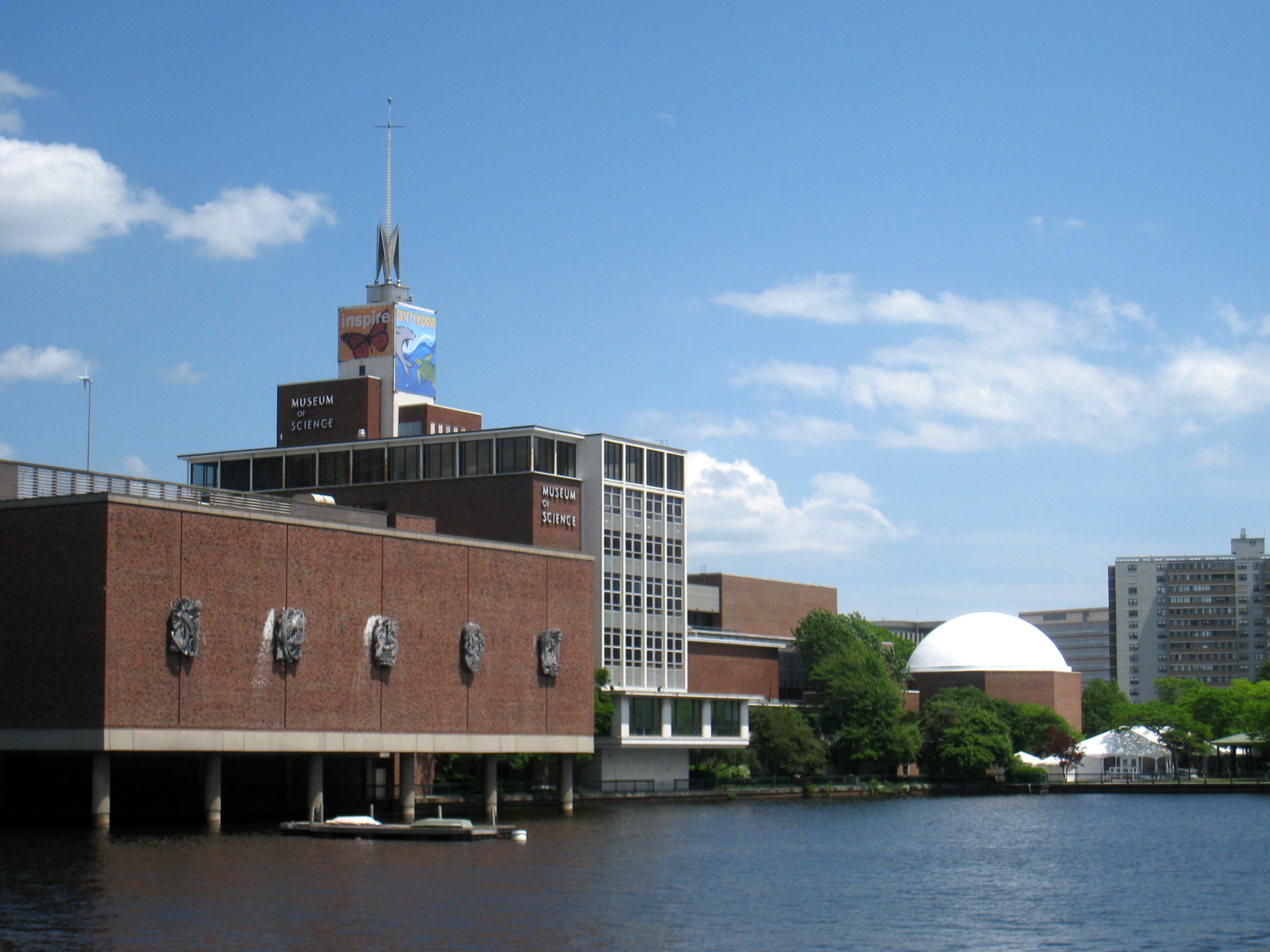
The Boston Museum of Science, located in the West End

Today, the West End is a mixed-use commercial and residential area. A few non-residential areas were spared from the urban renewal of the 1950s, such as Massachusetts General Hospital, the Charles Street Jail, and the Bulfinch Triangle—a small section surrounded by Causeway, Merrimac, and North Washington Streets. Massachusetts General Hospital and the Charles Street Jail are located in the northwest section, while Government Center which was the former site of Scollay Square, comprises the southern section. Most of the northern section is covered by North Station and the TD Garden.

The character of the area prior to the urban renewal can still be seen in existing commercial and mixed use building of the Bulfinch Triangle. Here there are a few pubs and restaurants that feed off the traffic traveling to and from Faneuil Hall and the Garden. The residential areas that have been rebuilt are primarily upscale highrises, though the neighborhood is currently making strides to re-establish the close knit community that once was. The West End Museum currently has a permanent exhibition outlining the history of the neighborhood and its residents, while the West End Community Center hosts classes and events, in addition to putting on the annual West End Children's Festival.

=== 42 Lomasney Way ===
One of the survivors of the West End's redevelopment phase is 42 Lomasney Way. Originally constructed in the 1870s, the building survived multiple redevelopment attempts, as well as two fires. Called "The Last Tenement" due to it being the only tenement structure still located in the West End, it also has been home to an associate of the Angiulo Brothers crime family.

== Demographics ==
According to the city of Boston, the total population was 4,080 as of the 2010 United States census. 75.2% of residents were white, 16.2% were Asian, and 8.4% were some other race. Housing in the West End was about 89.3% occupied.

== Notable people ==
- Jules Aarons (1921–2008), photographer "remembered for his poignant portraits of Boston's West End"
- James George Barbadoes (1796-1841), abolitionist
- Jennie Loitman Barron (1891–1969), suffragist, lawyer, and judge
- Bernard Berenson (1865–1959), art historian
- Lawrence Berk (1908–1995), founder of Berklee College of Music
- Hyman Bloom (1913–2009), artist and key figure in the Boston Expressionist movement
- Kirk Boott (1790–1837), industrialist
- Buddy Clark (1912–1949), singer
- John P. Coburn (1811–1873), abolitionist
- Thomas Dalton (1794–1883), abolitionist
- George W. Forbes (1864-1927), journalist, librarian
- Eliza Ann Gardner (1831–1922), abolitionist and religious leader
- Leonard Grimes (1815–1873), pastor, abolitionist
- Alan L. Gropman (b. 1938), military officer and college professor
- Primus Hall (1756–1842), civic leader
- Lewis Hayden (1811–1889), abolitionist
- John T. Hilton (1801–1864), abolitionist
- Robert Dwyer Joyce (1830–1883), poet
- Joseph E. Levine (1905–1987), film producer
- Barzillai Lew (1743–1822), Revolutionary War soldier
- Annie “Londonderry” Cohen Kopchovsky (1870–1947), first woman to ride around the world on a bicycle
- Thomas Melvill (1751–1832), American patriot
- William Cooper Nell (1816–1874), abolitionist
- Leonard Nimoy (1931–2015), actor
- John Boyle O'Reilly (1844–1890), poet
- Harrison Gray Otis (1765–1848), politician
- Thomas Paul (1773–1831), minister, abolitionist
- Sumner Redstone (1923-2020), media magnate
- Ruth Roman (1922–1999), actress
- George Lewis Ruffin (1834–1886), the first African-American graduate of Harvard Law School and the first black judge in the United States
- Josephine St. Pierre Ruffin (1842–1924) and her daughter Florida Ruffin Ridley (1861–1943), civil rights activists
- John J. Smith (1820–1906), abolitionist
- Isaac H. Snowden (1826–1869), physician, Liberian colonist
- David Walker (1796–1830), abolitionist
- Daniel A. Whelton (1872–1953), politician

== See also ==
- Bowdoin Square
- Charles Street Jail
- Leverett Street Jail (1822–1851)
- Massachusetts General Hospital
- Mission Hill, Boston
- Nashua Street Park
- National Theatre (1836–1863)
- North Station
- Old West Church
- Revere House (1847–1912)
- West End Museum
