= Martin Lomasney =

American political boss (1859–1933)

Martin Michael Lomasney
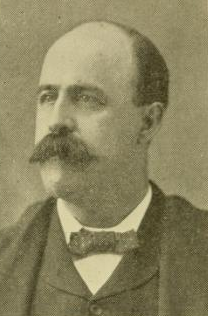
- Lomasney in 1921

Member of the Massachusetts State Senate from the 3rd Suffolk district
- In office 1896–1897
- Preceded by: Michael B. Gilbride
- Succeeded by: Daniel D. Rourke

Member of the Boston Board of Aldermen
- In office 1893–1895
- In office 1901–1903
- Constituency: 3rd District

Member of the Massachusetts House of Representatives
- In office 1899–1899
- In office 1906–1909
- Constituency: 8th Suffolk
- In office 1911–1917
- Constituency: 5th Suffolk
- In office 1921–1922
- Constituency: 5th Suffolk

Personal details
- Born: December 3, 1859 Boston, Massachusetts
- Died: August 12, 1933 (aged 73) Boston, Massachusetts
- Resting place: Holy Cross Cemetery, Malden, Massachusetts
- Party: Democratic
- Education: Mayhew School

Martin Michael Lomasney (December 3, 1859 – August 12, 1933) was an American Democratic Party politician from Boston, Massachusetts. Lomasney served as state senator, state representative, and city alderman, but he is best known as the political boss of Boston's West End and a leading figure in the city's ethnic Irish community. Lomasney wielded considerable influence in city and state politics for over 40 years and was nicknamed "Mahatma" for his uncanny ability to deliver votes for his preferred candidates. Over the course of his four-decade career, Lomasney was shot (once), allied and feuded with James Michael Curley and John F. Fitzgerald, told the archbishop of Boston to "mind his own business," advised presidential candidate Al Smith, played a major role in drafting the current Massachusetts Constitution, and helped thousands of constituents obtain jobs, housing, and other necessities.

Lomasney was born in the West End in 1859 to Irish immigrant parents who had fled the Great Famine. After dropping out of school, he led a street gang before entering politics to secure a patronage job as a lamplighter on Nashua Street. He quickly rose through the ranks of ward politics through his political vehicle, the Hendricks Club, and the use of blackmail, patronage, smear campaigning, and influence peddling. Lomasney became a popular politician himself and was elected to the board of aldermen in 1893. After surviving an assassination attempt in 1894, he was elected to the state senate, his highest public office, for one term. He served on and off in the state legislature and city government for the next three decades.

Initially, Lomasney's ward was predominantly Irish, but as the Irish began migrating to Roxbury and Dorchester, and the zoning board expanded his ward to include the North End and South End, Lomasney brought together a large, diverse coalition of poor and working-class voters. While Lomasney's primary motivations in politics were practical rather than idealistic, he was an active supporter of Irish independence and opponent of women's suffrage.

== Early life ==
Lomasney was born in the West End of Boston on December 3, 1859 to Maurice and Mary (née Murray) Lomasney. His parents were immigrants from Fermoy, County Cork, Ireland, who fled the Great Famine. His father was a tailor.

After his parents and one of his siblings died, Lomasney and his two brothers Joseph and Edward moved in with their aunt and maternal grandmother. "Joe" would later become Lomasney's political lieutenant. The boys were expected to earn their keep, and Martin dropped out of school at age 10 to shine shoes, deliver papers and, later, work in a machine shop. In his spare time, he read anything that he could get his hands on, except fiction.

For a time, he was the leader of a local Irish street gang.

== Political career ==
In 1884, Lomasney went to work as a ward heeler for Mike Wells, a local politician, and was rewarded with a city job as a lamplighter on Boston's Nashua Street. The job paid well and gave him ample time for political activities. He became the leader of a group of young Democrats, known as the "Independents," who were determined to unseat the incumbent Democrats on the Ward Committee.

=== The Hendricks Club ===
In 1885, Lomasney founded a headquarters for the Independents at 11A Green Street. It was named The Hendricks Club after Vice President Thomas A. Hendricks, a supporter of Irish independence. The clubhouse featured a pot-bellied stove, a pool table, and a poker table. Liquor and dice-playing were strictly forbidden. Lomasney kept an office on the second floor, where he spent his days dispensing and calling in favors for supporters: jobs, housing, immigration assistance, coal in the winter, influence in court cases, funeral expenses, and seed money for business ventures. He kept a file of embarrassing information on his colleagues which often proved useful in negotiations. The Hendricks was one of the earliest political clubs of its kind. Lomasney called the club "a machine for getting votes."

Lomasney frequently sent aides to the docks in East Boston to meet new immigrants and to carry signs that read, "Welcome to America. The Democratic Party Welcomes You to America. Martin Lomasney Welcomes You to Boston." Often, the newcomers were desperately poor and unskilled, and the Hendricks Club would help them find manual labor and decent housing. He earned the loyalty of countless residents, who showed their gratitude by voting as he suggested. His ability to deliver as many votes as needed for a candidate or piece of legislation earned him the nickname "the Mahatma." Other bosses soon followed his example: Thomas W. Flood's Somerset Associates in the North End (1888), John F. Fitzgerald's Jefferson Club in North End (early 1890s), James Michael Curley's Tammany Club in Roxbury (1901).

On the Sunday before every election, ward residents would pack the large hall to hear Lomasney speak on the issues and candidates of the day. Despite his lack of formal education, he was an eloquent speaker with a fondness for poetic quotations. He was also a powerful orator who, like a revivalist preacher, could stir the crowd into a near-frenzy. Former residents of the ward often traveled long distances to attend his "sermons," and local newspapers sent their best reporters to cover the event.

=== Public office and campaign tactics ===
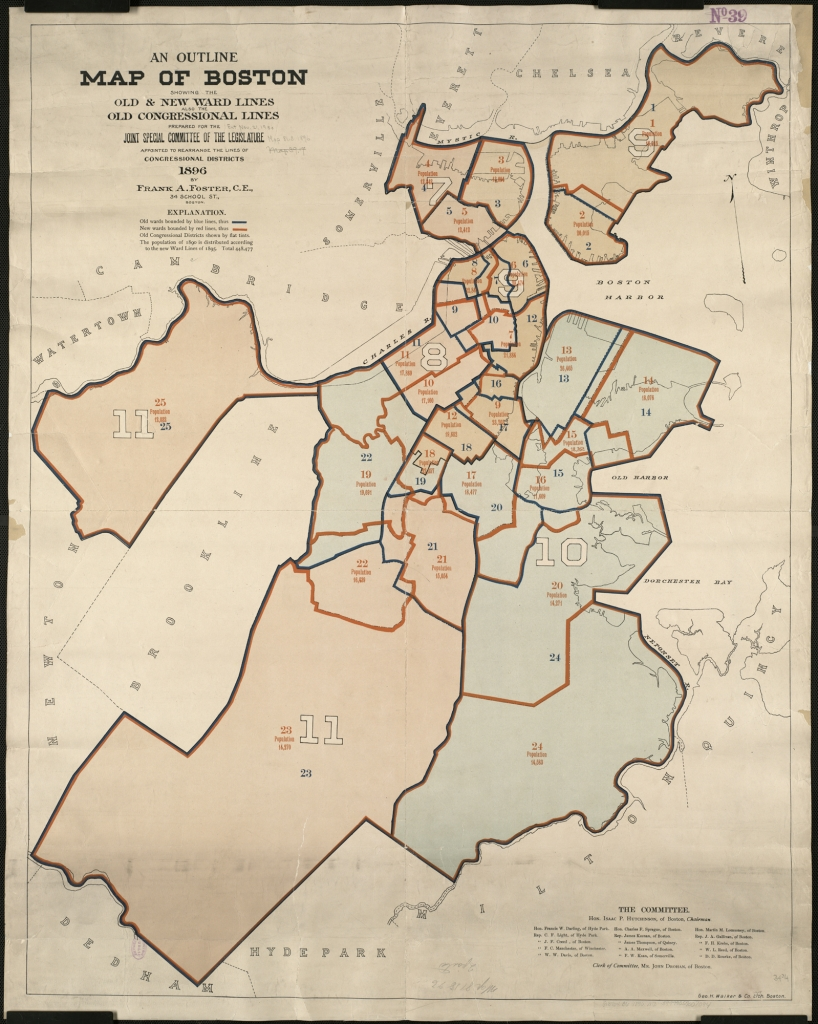
Political wards in Boston, 1896

Lomasney earned his first public office with a seat on the Boston Board of Aldermen in 1893. Boston politics were not for the faint of heart. Candidates were routinely smeared and threatened, and voters were bribed and blackmailed. A common practice was to send aides dressed as Protestant clergymen to "campaign" for rival candidates in Irish Catholic neighborhoods. Lomasney played political hardball and made many enemies as well as friends. He feuded with James Michael Curley for 20 years.

In 1894, Lomasney was shot in the leg in an unsuccessful assassination attempt. His assailant, James A. Dunan, blamed Lomasney for a dispute that he had with the Boston Board of Health.

In 1895, Lomasney was elected to the Massachusetts State Senate. As a Senator, he opposed the construction of Boston's elevated railway.

One of Lomasney's dirty tricks has earned a special place in Boston history. In 1898, as chairman of his district Democratic Party, he was responsible for organizing the convention to nominate a State Senate candidate (who was practically guaranteed election in the heavily Democratic city). He scheduled the convention for 4:30 p.m. in East Boston, across the harbor from the State House, where nomination papers had to be filed by 5:00 p.m. that day. His faction met in one room and the rival faction met in another, with each nominating its own candidate. Both factions then raced their paperwork across the harbor by ferry and tugboat and then to cyclists, who pedaled furiously up Beacon Hill to the State House. Lomasney's courier arrived first by several minutes.

In 1905, Lomasney endorsed Yankee Republican Louis Frothingham for Mayor against his Democratic rival John F. Fitzgerald and delivered Frothingham 95% of the vote from his ward. Like Lomasney, Frothingham was opposed to women's suffrage. In the end, the Republican vote was split by another contender, Henry M. Dewey, and Frothingham lost to Fitzgerald.

After being elected to the Massachusetts House of Representatives in 1910, Lomasney worked with labor leaders to enact a 48-hour work week and workmen's compensation but opposed their attempts to exclude aliens from their unions.

In 1912, when the Suffolk Evening Law School petitioned the state legislature for the right to grant degrees, elites on the Massachusetts Board of Education, the Boston Bar Association, and Harvard University objected. At the time, evening law schools were an important path to the middle class for ambitious sons of working-class immigrants. The first students at Suffolk came from Irish, Italian, Jewish, and other backgrounds. Members of Boston's Yankee-dominated legal establishment took a dim view of such school. One of them remarked that trying to make attorneys out of such people was "like trying to turn cart horses into trotters." Lomasney campaigned strenuously for the school, and it gained the right to grant degrees in 1914.

At the Democratic National Conventions in St. Louis in 1916 and in San Francisco in 1920, Lomasney tried to have a plank added to the party platform endorsing the independence of Ireland. Both times, his request was denied.

=== Massachusetts Constitutional Convention ===
Lomasney was one of 320 delegates to the Massachusetts Constitutional Convention of 1917–19, representing the 5th Suffolk District of the Massachusetts House of Representatives. The convention's historian, Raymond L. Bridgman, later wrote, "Martin M. Lomasney was conspicuously the most intense personal force in the convention. He was a leader, a hard hitter, a fair fighter, generous, sympathetic, respected by all who came close enough to feel the strength of his personal qualities."

At the convention, Lomasney argued in support of two amendments, both of which passed. The first allowed the state and local governments to provide the people with food, shelter, and other necessities in times of war or emergency. Conservatives denounced the measure as socialist. The second prohibited the state from funding private denominational institutions such as schools, hospitals, and charitable agencies. Lomasney researched the issue and found that while Protestant institutions had received $18 million from the state, Catholic institutions had received only $49,000. When Archbishop of Boston William Henry O'Connell pressured him to oppose the amendment, Lomasney reportedly said, "Tell His Eminence to mind his own business."

=== Later career ===
When his career started, Lomasney's ward was predominantly Irish. Over the years, as the Irish began moving to Roxbury and Dorchester, Jewish immigrants became the dominant group. The city zoning board gradually expanded the ward to include the Italian-dominated North End and part of the racially diverse South End. By 1930, over 30 nationalities were represented in the ward. By backing diverse candidates for the House of Representatives and by treating his constituents equally, Lomasney managed to bring together a large, ethnically diverse coalition of mostly poor and working-class voters.

Presidential candidate Al Smith sought Lomasney's advice on campaign issues in 1928. When John F. Fitzgerald asked him to support Franklin D. Roosevelt in 1932, however, Lomasney declined, predicting Roosevelt's election would lead to war.

His final political battle took place in 1932, when he led the successful campaign of William M. Prendible for Clerk of the Suffolk County Superior Criminal Court.

== Personal life ==
Lomasney never married or had children. A practicing Catholic, he went to church regularly. Outside politics, he led a quiet, almost ascetic life. Although he never drank, he vehemently opposed Prohibition because he knew that it would force the local tavern keepers to take up bootlegging.

Apart from his political activities, he made a fortune in the 1920s by investing in real estate, which he later sold to developers at a considerable profit.

== Death ==
On August 12, 1933, after a months-long bout of bronchial pneumonia, he died at home surrounded by family and friends. He had been living in the Hotel Bellevue. He left an estate valued at approximately $250,000, but his will provided only a modest annuity for his brother Joe with whom he had been feuding.

== Legacy ==
Soon after his death, the West End political machine began to crumble.

Lomasney once advised a young follower, "Don't write when you can talk; don't talk when you can nod your head." Perhaps for that reason, no well-documented full-length biography has been written about him. Historian Thomas H. O'Connor called Leslie G. Ainley's Boston Mahatma: Martin Lomasney (1949) "a fascinating but undocumented account" of his life.

For a ward boss of his day, Lomasney appears to have been relatively ethical. Although his power over the voters in his ward often prompted allegations of voter fraud, nothing was ever proved. Even a rival, John F. Fitzgerald (also known as "Honey Fitz"), told a historian years later that Ward Eight had been too closely watched for Lomasney to have been able to get away with that.Criminal rackets never thrived in the West End until after Lomasney's tenure.

A street, Lomasney Way, Boston is named after him, and the Ward 8 cocktail was inspired by him.

== See also ==
- 42 Lomasney Way
- 1915 Massachusetts legislature
- 1917 Massachusetts legislature
- 1921–1922 Massachusetts legislature
- 1927–1928 Massachusetts legislature

== Bibliography ==
=== Books and academic articles ===
- Ainley, Leslie G. (1949). Boston Mahatma: Martin Lomasney. Boston: Bruce Humphries, Inc.
- Hennessy, Michael E. (1935). "Passing of Martin M. Lomasney". Four Decades of Massachusetts Politics, 1890–1935. Norwood, Mass.: The Norwood Press. pp. 481–484.
- Minichiello, Susan (June 5, 2012). "The life, legend and lessons of Martin Lomasney: Ward boss, West End icon". Boston.com. Archived from the original on July 29, 2016.
- O'Connor, Thomas H. (1998). Boston Catholics: A History of the Church and Its People. UPNE. ISBN 9781555533595.
- O'Connor, Thomas H. (1995). The Boston Irish: A Political History. Boston: Northeastern University Press. ISBN 9781555532208.
- Ryan, Dennis P. (1979). "Beyond the ballot box: a social history of the Boston Irish, 1845-1917". University of Massachusetts-Amherst. Archived from the original on 2017-09-11.
- Van Nostrand, Albert D. (December 1948). "The Lomasney Legend". The New England Quarterly. 21 (4): 435–458. doi:10.2307/361565. JSTOR 361565.
- "Martin M. Lomasney Scrapbooks". Massachusetts Historical Society.

=== State records ===
- Bridgman, Arthur Milnor (1895). A Souvenir of Massachusetts Legislators: 1895. Brockton, Mass.: A. M. Bridgman.
- Bridgman, Arthur Milnor (1896). A Souvenir of Massachusetts Legislators: 1896. Brockton, Mass.: A. M. Bridgman.
- Bridgman, Arthur Milnor (1897). A Souvenir of Massachusetts Legislators: 1897. Brockton, Mass.: A. M. Bridgman.
- Bridgman, Arthur Milnor (1898). A Souvenir of Massachusetts Legislators: 1898. Brockton, Mass.: A. M. Bridgman.
- Bridgman, Raymond L. (1923). The Massachusetts Constitutional Convention of 1917. Boston: The Author.
- Howard, Richard T. (1922). Public Officials of Massachusetts, 1921-1922. Boston: The Boston Review.
- Journal of the Constitutional Convention of the Commonwealth of Massachusetts, 1917. Boston, MA: Wright & Potter Printing Co., State Printers. 1919.

=== Further reading ===
- Galvin, John T. (November 1990). "The Mahatma Called the Shots, and Everyone Knew It: Part 1" (PDF). The West Ender. 6 (4): 10.
- Galvin, John T. (December 1990). "The Mahatma Called the Shots, and Everyone Knew It: Part 2" (PDF). The West Ender. Vol. 6, no. 5. p. 9.
- Galvin, John T. (March 1991). "The Mahatma Called the Shots, and Everyone Knew It: Part 3" (PDF). The West Ender. Vol. 7, no. 1. p. 9.
- "Martin M. Lomasney and the Boston Herald". The Sacred Heart Review. 34 (18): 281. October 1905.
- "Boston Alderman Shot: Martin B.[sic] Lomasney Receives a Bullet Wound in His Leg" (PDF). The New York Times. March 8, 1894.
- "Lomasney Dead, Ill for Months: Bronchial Pneumonia Takes Fighting Martin". The Boston Globe. August 13, 1933.
- "Lomasney Left $300,000, but Never Had a Checkbook; Mahatma's Death Means Passing from Political Scene of Last of Old-Time Bosses; Anecdotes of a Colorful Personality". The Boston Globe. August 20, 1933.
- "Brother to Contest Will of Lomasney; Joseph Left $3000 Yearly Income and $2500 Cash by Martin, West End Politician". The Boston Globe. September 21, 1933.
