= Alan L. Gropman =

US Air Force colonel (1938–2026)

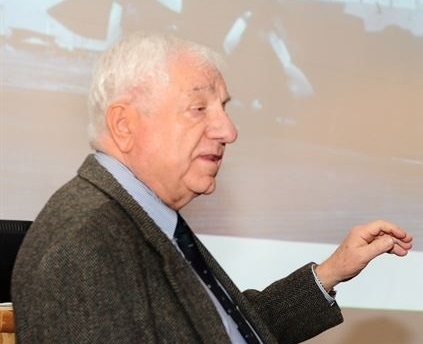
- Gropman lecturing in 2010
- Born: 4 February 1938; Medford, Massachusetts, U.S.
- Died: 31 May 2026 (aged 88)
- Education: Boston University (BA) (MA); Tufts University (PhD)
- Occupations: College professor and lecturer
- Years active: 1991–?
- Notable work: The Air Force Integrates, 1945–1964
- Awards: Major General I. B. Holley Award (2010)
- Military career
- Allegiance: United States of America
- Branch: United States Air Force
- Service years: 1959–1986
- Rank: Colonel
- Conflicts: Vietnam War
- Awards: Defense Superior Service Medal; Legion of Merit; Distinguished Flying Cross; Air Medal (5 OLC)

Alan Louis Gropman (4 February 1938 – 31 May 2026) was an American military officer, academic and author. He served 27 years on active duty in the United States Air Force, finishing his career as a colonel. After retiring from the Air Force, he became a professor of history and grand strategy at the Industrial College of the Armed Forces, an institution that is part of the National Defense University. Gropham later became an adjunct professor at Georgetown University and George Mason University. Over the years he wrote four books and over 600 articles. Gropman also made six appearances on C-SPAN.

== Early life and education ==
Gropman was born in Medford, Massachusetts, on 4 February 1938. He was the son of Jack and Miriam Gropman. He grew up in the west end of Boston.

He attended Boston University, receiving a Bachelor of Arts degree in 1959. He was awarded a Master of Arts degree from that institution in 1970. As an Air Force officer, he attended Air Command and Staff College in 1972 and then Air War College in 1978, where he was a distinguished graduate. In between those two professional military education schools, he earned a Doctor of Philosophy degree in history from Tufts University, completing that degree program in 1975. He later attended the National War College, receiving his diploma in 1982.

== Air Force officer ==
Gropman entered the Air Force in 1959. As a junior officer and young major, Gropman served in various duty assignments as a C-130 navigator. This included two tours in Vietnam, where he flew over 670 combat missions, and he also served as a war planner in Europe.

In 1970, Gropman became an assistant professor of history at the United States Air Force Academy. He taught there through the 1974 academic year. He was then transferred to the Pentagon, where he served as an Air Staff plans and programs officer from 1978 to 1981. His next assignment was at the National War College, where he served as the assistant dean of faculty for four years. In 1983, he returned to the Pentagon for his final assignment. During that tour of duty, Gropman led the Air Staff's plans and programs integration office.

Over the course of his career, Gropman earned a number of military decorations including the Defense Superior Service Medal, Legion of Merit, Distinguished Flying Cross, six Air Medals, and the Vietnam Gallantry Cross with Palm. Gropman ended his Air Force career as a colonel. He retired in June 1986 after serving 27 years on active duty.

== College professor ==
After retiring from active duty, Gropman remained in the Washington area. He went to work as a senior principal analyst and program manager for the SYSCON Corporation. He remained with the company for five years.

In 1991, Gropman took a faculty position teaching history at the Industrial College of the Armed Forces (now officially known as the Dwight D. Eisenhower School for National Security and Resource Strategy), a component college within the National Defense University. As a member of the Industrial College faculty, he taught both core courses and elective classes. One of his most popular elective courses was Public Policy Formulation: Think Tanks. That course explored how think tanks in the Washington area influence public policy. He taught that class regularly for twenty years. He also taught courses at the National War College, another component institution within the National Defense University.

Shortly after joining the Industrial College faculty, Gropman began a tutoring and mentoring program that brought faculty and students from the Industrial College to Amidon-Bowen Elementary School in southwest Washington. He continued to lead and develop that program for the next two decades. As part of his program, Gropman arranged an annual trip that took elementary school students to the Gettysburg Battlefield for an on-site history lesson.

In 1996, Gropman become chairman of the grand strategy and mobilization department at the Industrial College. He continued to teach at the college for another 15 years. In 2010, he was honored by the Air Force Historical Society with the Major General I. B. Holley Award, which recognizes a lifetime of significant contributions to the recording of Air Force history. In August 2011, Gropman retired from the Industrial College of the Armed Forces and National Defense University faculty. His retirement ceremony was attended by nearly 300 people.

After leaving the Industrial College of the Armed Force, Gropman became an adjunct professor at both Georgetown University and George Mason University. In 2011, he also joined the advisory board of George Mason University's School for Conflict Analysis and Resolution. He later became chairman of that board. Today, Gropman is the National Defense University's distinguished professor emeritus of national security policy. He also continues to write and lecture on a wide range of military history, national strategy, and government policy topics.

Gropman made six appearances on the C-SPAN television network. His first appearance was in 1996. His most recent C-SPAN engagement was in 2010. On C-SPAN, Gropman has discussed the history of African Americans in the United States military, various World War I and World War II topics, and the World Leadership Forum. In addition, Gropman served for many years on the editorial board of the Joint Force Quarterly, a National Defense University Press publication. He also served as a book review editor for Air Power History.

== Death ==
Gropman died on 31 May 2026, at the age of 88.

== Publications ==
Over the years, Gropman has written four books and edited another. He has also written more than 600 articles, feature commentaries, essays, monographs, anthology chapters, and book reviews. His books include:

- The Air Force Integrates, 1945–1964 (First edition published by United States Air Force History Office, 1977; second edition, Smithsonian Institution Scholarly Press, 1998; third edition, University Press of the Pacific, 2002); ISBN 9781935623557
- Airpower and the airlift evacuation of Kham Duc (United States Air Force History Office, 1979); ISBN 9780912799308
- Mobilizing U.S. Industry in World War II (Institute for National Strategic Studies, 1996); ISBN 9781478214380
- Big "L": American Logistics in World War II (National Defense University Press, 1997), ISBN 9780160486685

Gropman's official correspondence and papers along with his research material are archived at the Air Force Historical Research Agency. Some of his archived documents are restricted due to the material's security classification. Much of the archived material is related to his book that chronicles African Americans in the United States military and the military's desegregation efforts from 1945 through 1964. The archive includes important reports and policy documents from World War II through the Kennedy and Johnson administrations.

== See also ==
- National Defense University
- Dwight D. Eisenhower School for National Security and Resource Strategy
- School for Conflict Analysis and Resolution
