= Lamplighter =

Person employed to light and maintain street lights

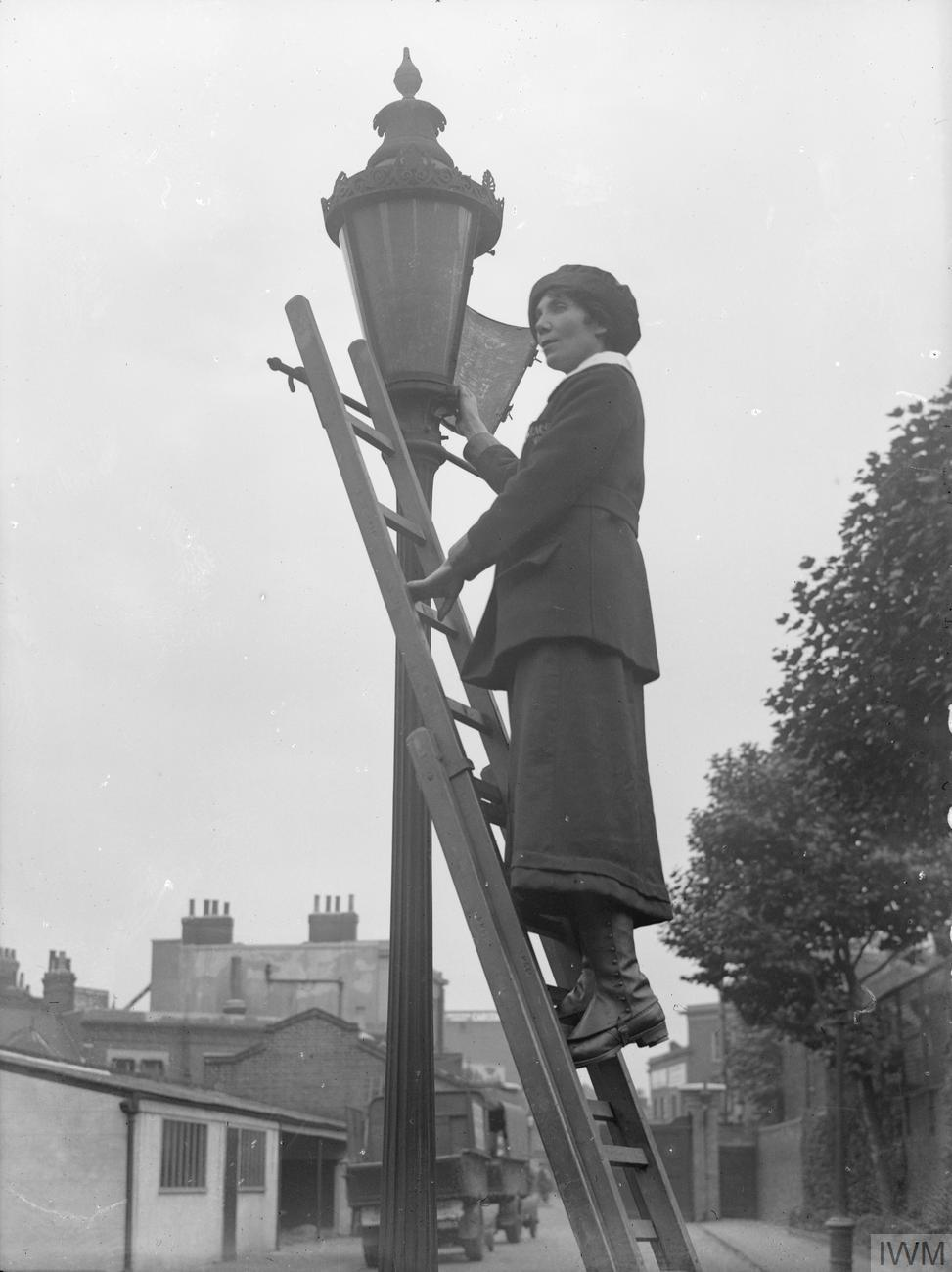
A lamplighter tasked with cleaning and lighting street lamps in Britain during World War I

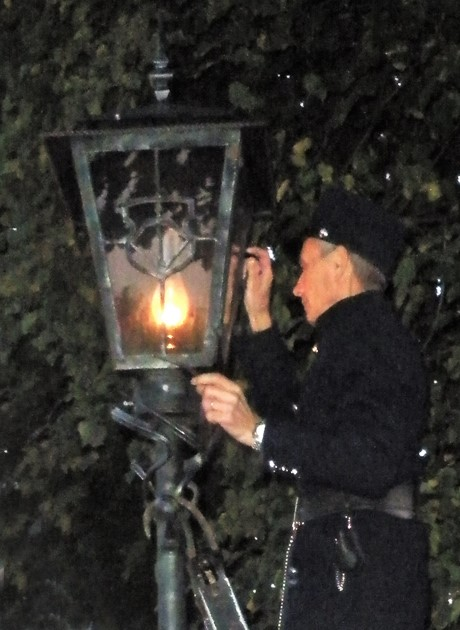
The lamplighter in Brest, Belarus (15 October 2011).

A lamplighter or gaslighter is a person employed to light and maintain street lights. These included candles, oil lamps, and gas lighting.

Public street lighting was developed in the 16th century. During this time, lamplighters toured public streets at dusk, lighting outdoor fixtures by means of a wick on a long pole. At dawn, the lamplighter would return to put them out using a small hook on the same pole. Other duties include carrying a ladder and renewing the candles, oil, or gas mantles.

In some communities, lamplighters served in a role akin to a town watchman; in others, it may have been seen as little more than a sinecure.

Beginning with Frederick Albert Winsor's 1807 exhibition at the Pall Mall, gas lights steadily overtook candles and oil lamps as the dominant form of street lighting. Early gaslights required lamplighters, but by the late 19th century, systems were developed which allowed the lights to operate automatically. The advent of incandescent lighting diminished the necessity of hiring lamplighters.

Lamplighting is not as prevalent in modern times. However, certain cities maintain the tradition to attract tourism. These include Zagreb, Croatia; Wroclaw, Poland; and Brest, Belarus.

== Today ==
In Brest, Belarus, as a tourist attraction, a lamplighter has been employed since 2009 to light the kerosene lamps in the shopping street every day.

As of 2022, a small team of lamplighters operate in London, England where gas lights have been preserved by English Heritage.

In the European Union, there are two cities where lamplighters are still on duty: Zagreb, Croatia and Wroclaw, Poland.

In Waikiki, Hawaii, lamplighters in traditional Hawaiian costumes run along the shore and light gas torches in the evening.

== Modern outdoors usage ==
In the late-19th and 20th centuries, most cities with gas streetlights replaced them with electric streetlights. For example, Baltimore, the first US city to install gas streetlights, removed nearly all of them in 1957. A gas lamp is located at N. Holliday Street and E. Baltimore Street as a monument to the first gas lamp in America, erected at that location.

However, gas lighting of streets has not disappeared completely from some cities, and the few municipalities that retained gas lighting now find that it provides a pleasing nostalgic effect. Gas lighting is also seeing a resurgence in the luxury home market for those in search of historical authenticity.

The largest gas lighting network in the world is that of Berlin, Germany. With about 37,000 lamps (2014), it holds more than half of all working gas street lamps in the world. In central London around 1500 gas lamps still operate, lighting the Royal Parks, the exterior of Buckingham Palace and almost the entire Covent Garden area. The Park Estate in Nottingham retains much of its original character, including the original gas lighting network.

In the United States, more than 2800 gas lights in Boston, Massachusetts, operate in the historic districts of Beacon Hill, Back Bay, Bay Village, Charlestown, and parts of other neighborhoods. In Cincinnati, Ohio, more than 1100 gas lights operate in areas that have been named historic districts. Gas lights also operate in parts of the famed French Quarter and outside historic homes throughout the city in New Orleans, Louisiana.

South Orange, New Jersey, has adopted the gaslight as the symbol of the town, and uses them on nearly all streets. Several other towns in New Jersey also retain gas lighting: Glen Ridge, Palmyra, Riverton, and some parts of Orange, Cape May, and Cherry Hill. The village of Riverside, Illinois, uses its original gas street lights that are an original feature of the Frederick Law Olmsted planned community. Manhattan Beach, California, has a gas lamp section in which all the sidewalks are lit by public gas lamps. Disneyland has authentic 19th century gas lamps from Baltimore along the "Main Street, U.S.A." section of the theme park.

Many gas utility companies will still quote a fixed periodic rate for a customer-maintained gas lamp, and some homeowners still use such devices. However, the high cost of natural gas lighting at least partly explains why a large number of older gas lamps have been converted to electricity. Solar-rechargeable battery-powered gas light controllers can be easily retrofitted into existing gas lamps to keep the lights off during daylight hours and cut energy consumption and green-house gas carbon emissions by 50%.

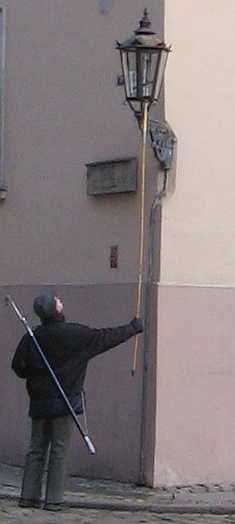
Lamplighter in Wrocław's Ostrów Tumski ("Cathedral Island") district, Poland, November 2005.

== In culture ==
In 1928, Irish poet Máirtín Ó Direáin published "Fear Lasta Lampaí" ("lamp-lighting man").

In 1942, American composer Hoagy Carmichael composed "Lamplighter's Serenade." It was recorded by Frank Sinatra during his first session as a solo artist, on 19 January 1942. Bing Crosby recorded a version of the song days later.

In the 1943 novella The Little Prince, a lamplighter must extinguish and relight a lamp every 30 seconds due to his planet's rapid rotation and frequent sunsets.

Additionally, the 1946 song "The Old Lamp-Lighter" was a pop song featuring music by Nat Simon and lyrics by Charles Tobias.

John le Carré's 1974 spy novel Tinker Tailor Soldier Spy refers to Lamplighters as a section of British Intelligence that provided surveillance and couriers.

The 1975 Soviet film The Adventures of Buratino features a "Lamplighters' Song," in which a group of lamplighters perform ballet-inspired choreography while singing about their nightly duties.

In 2013, New York (City) Police Department (NYPD) whistleblower Frank Serpico, an NYPD officer, prefers to use the term "lamp-lighter" to describe the whistleblower's role as a watchman.

In 2018, Jack the Lamplighter, portrayed by Lin-Manuel Miranda, is a character in the film Mary Poppins Returns. He and fellow lamplighters (known in slang as "leeries"), perform the musical number "Trip a Little Light Fantastic."

== Gallery ==
Lamplighters in art

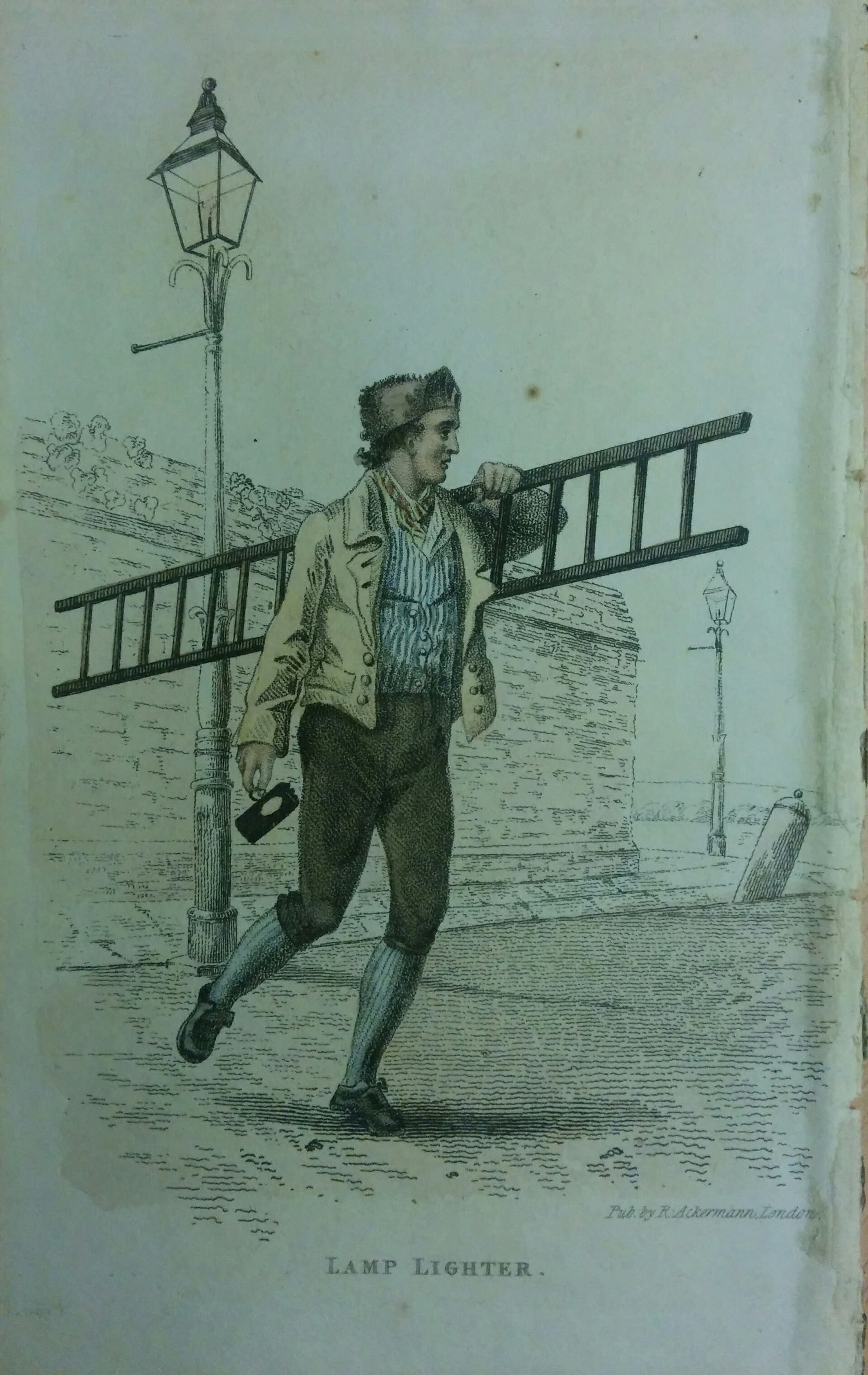
Lithograph published in The World in Miniature (London, Rudolph Ackermann, 1821–1825)

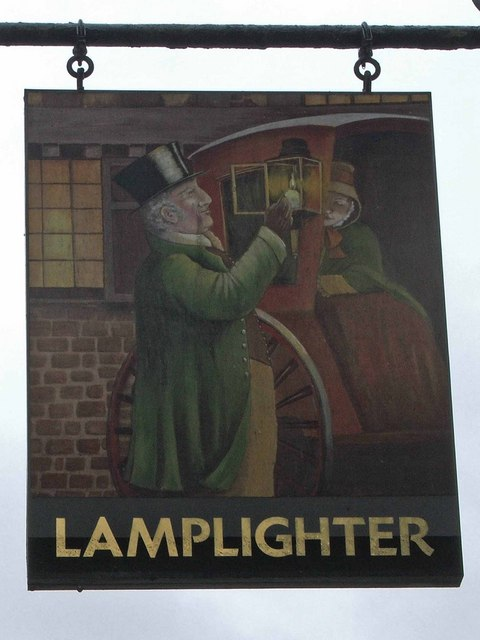
Lamplighter pubsign Stratford-upon-Avon, in England

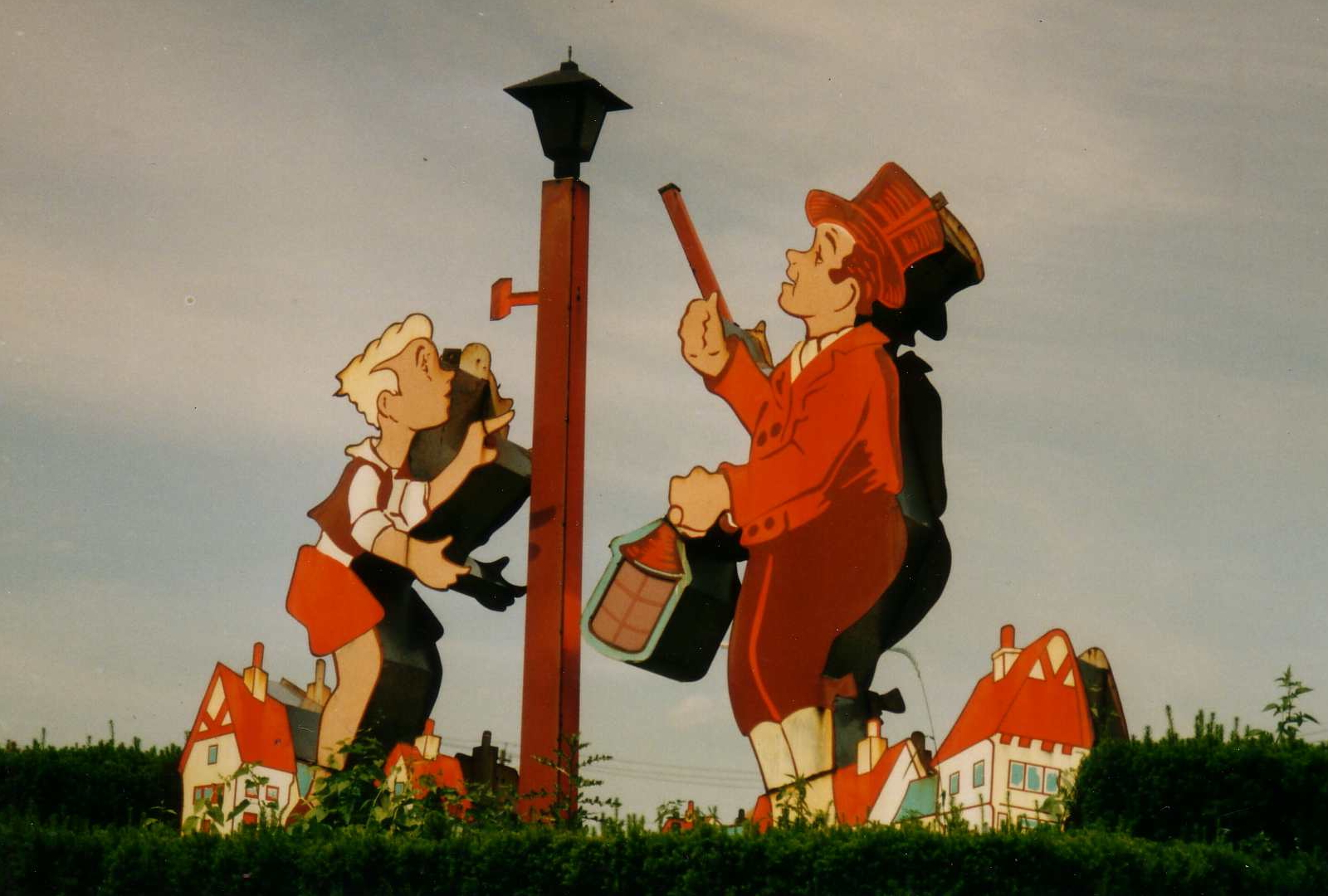
Historic Howard Johnson's motel "lamplighter" sign in front of a property in Albany, New York

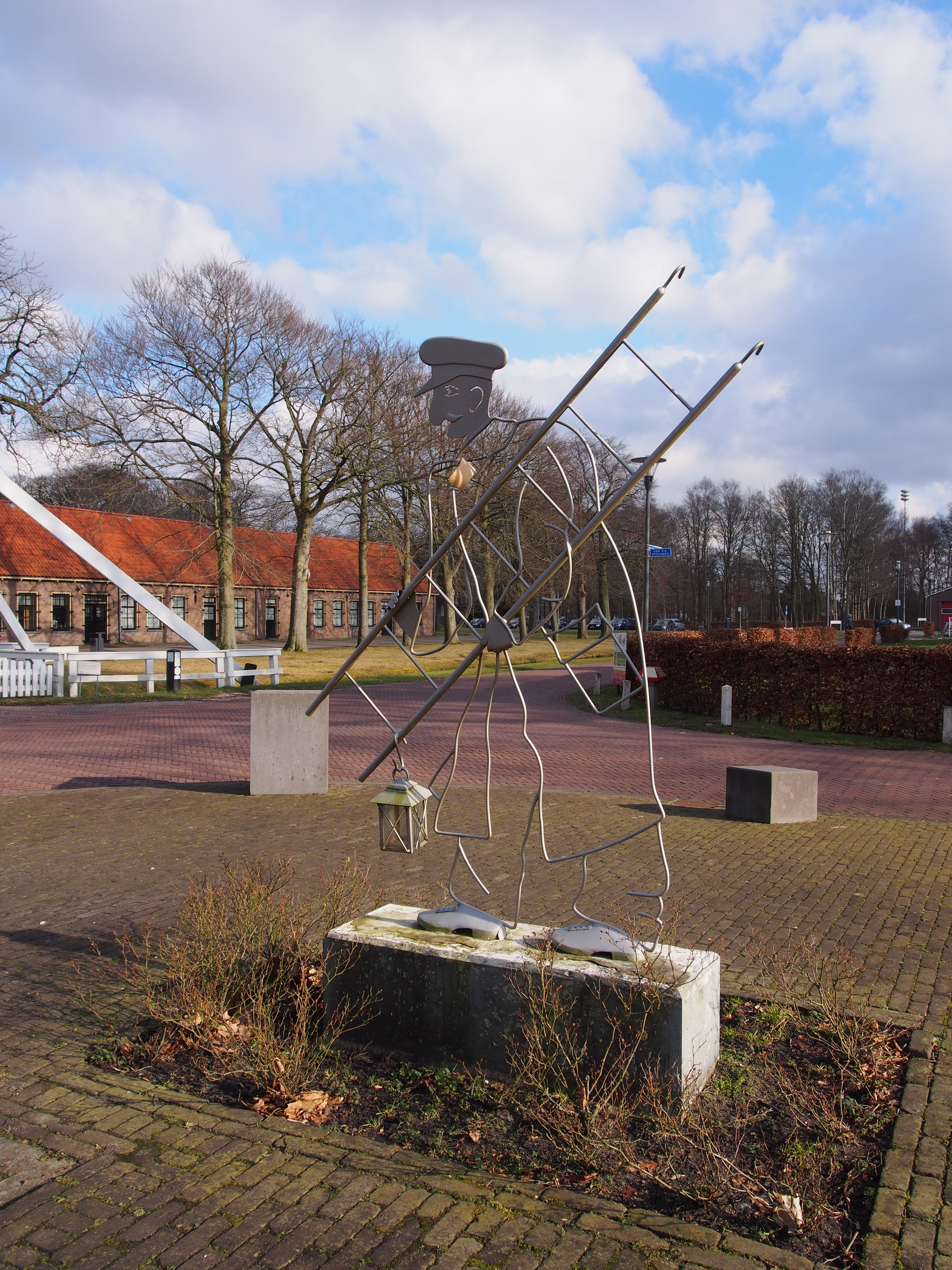
De Lantaarnopsteker by H.S. Bosma in Veenhuizen (2006)

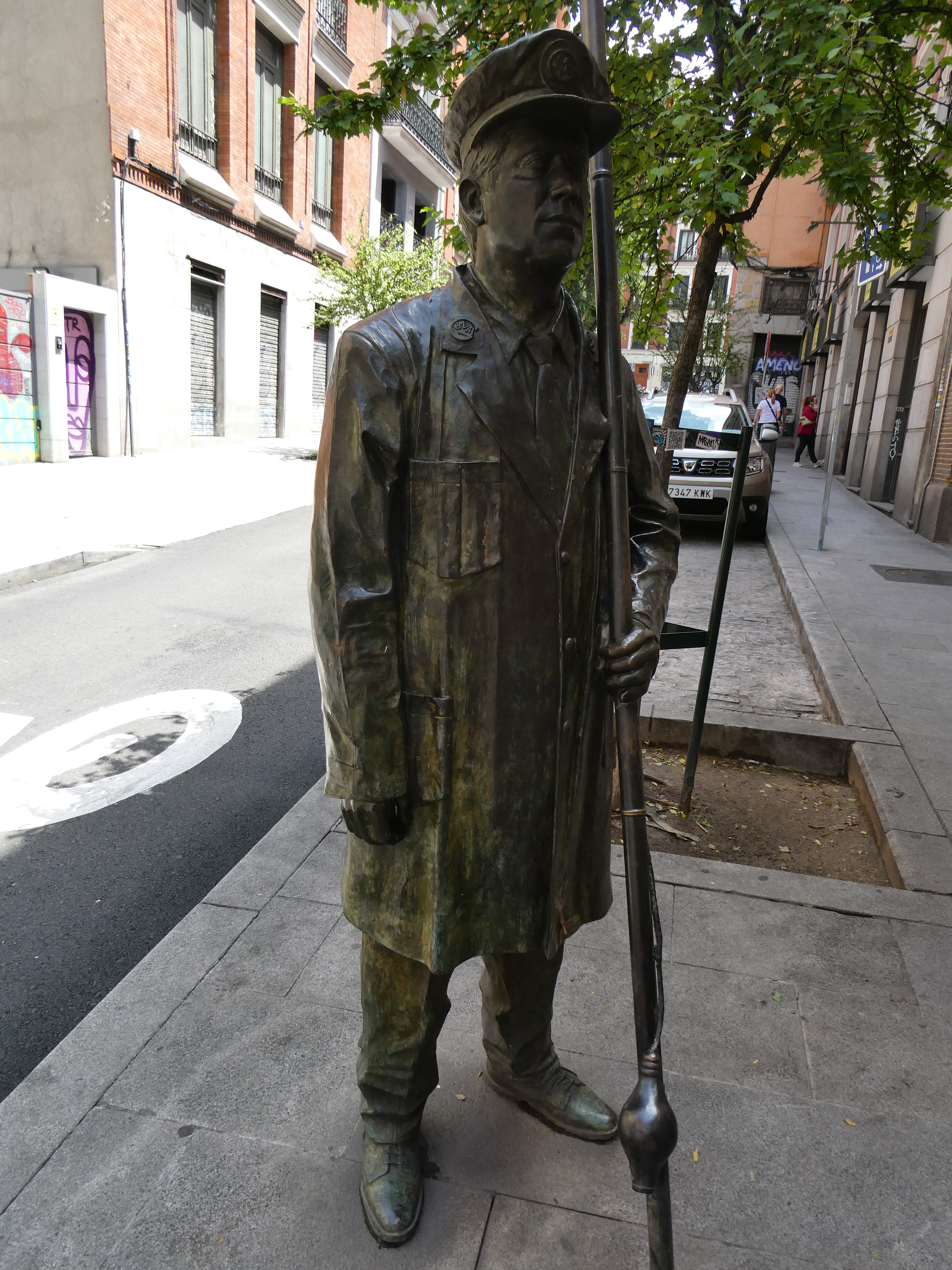
Statue of a lamp-lighter (farolero) in Madrid
