= Paul H. Carr (physicist) =

American physicist

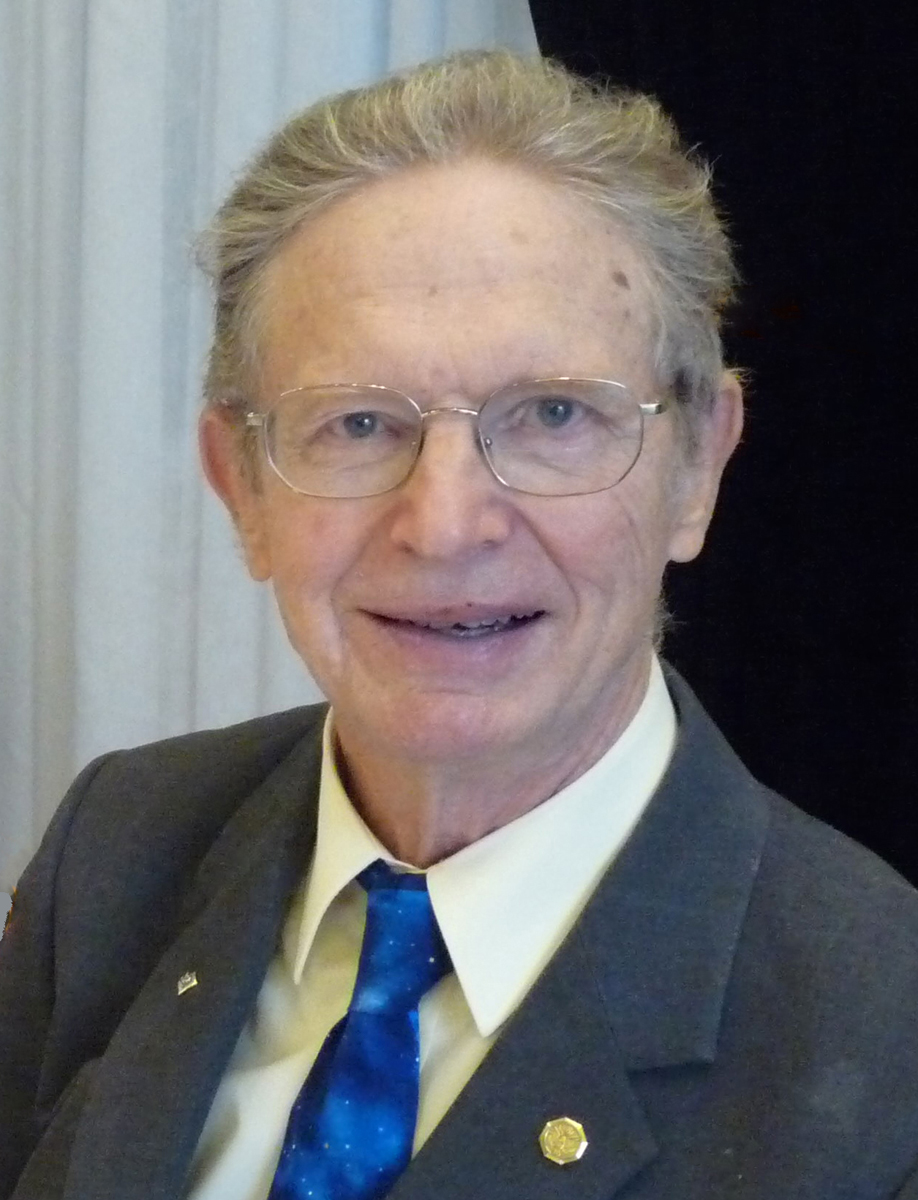
Paul H. Carr

Paul Henry Carr (born May 12, 1935) is a physicist and philosopher. His ten patents have contributed to compact, low-cost filters and signal processing devices for radar, TV, and cell phones.

== Biography ==
Born in Boston, raised in Cabot and Richford, VT, Carr graduated from Boston Latin School in 1953, earned a B.S. degree in physics in 1957, and a M.S. degree in physics in 1961, both from Massachusetts Institute of Technology. He earned a Ph.D., also in physics, from Brandeis University in 1966.

After serving as a lieutenant in the Army Ordnance Corps, Redstone Arsenal, AL, Carr led the Component Technology Branch of the Air Force Research Laboratory (formerly AF Cambridge Research Laboratory and Rome Laboratory) Bedford, MA from 1967 to 1995. He won the Marcus O'Day Memorial Award for the best laboratory paper published in a scientific journal in 1967. The paper "Microwave Rectification using Quartz and Zinc Oxide" was published in the Journal of Applied Physics, vol.38,5153-5164, December 1967.

He Was Technical Program Chairman of the 1976 IEEE Ultrasonics Symposium. The Air Force Office of Scientific Research awarded his branch a STAR TEAM Award for basic research excellence in electromagnetic components (1990). He was the Rome Laboratory Ralph I. Cole ENGINEER OF THE YEAR in 1991. His over 90 scientific papers include one on the application of Rome Laboratory Surface Acoustic Wave(SAW)Devices.

The Institute of Electrical and Electronics Engineers elected him a Fellow in 1979 "for contributions to microwave acoustics and their use as signal processing components." He also is a fellow of the Institute on Religion in an Age of Science and the American Scientific Affiliation. Paul is a life member of the American Physical Society, North American Paul Tillich Society, the Thoreau Society, and the Academy of Senior Professionals at Eckerd College.

The John Templeton Foundation awarded him a grant for the philosophy course "Science and Religion: Cosmos to Consciousness" he taught at UMass Lowell from 1998 to 2000. This inspired his book "Beauty in Science and Spirit," published by Beech River Books in 2006. He authored a number of articles and book reviews in Zygon: Journal of Religion and Science

He was co-editor of the Newsletter of New England Section of the American Physical Society http://www.physics.ccsu.edu/aps-nes/News.htm from 2004 to 2012.

He participated in a debate on global warming at the American Physical Society Meeting at U Mass Amherst, November, 2011. This resulted in his paper "Weather extremes from anthropogenic global warming" published in. He argued that humans influence our climate in an IEEE Climate Discussion/Debate on NewTV, Newton, MA, August 27, 2014, https://www.youtube.com/watch?v=9U_Nf3qEasE&t=246s

He championed the www.iras.org 2017 CLIMATE CHANGE CONFERENCE on Star Island and presented the PowerPoint "What are we doing to our climate? What is it doing to us? What can we do?" In June 2018, The Institute of Religion in an Age of Science awarded him its Academic Fellow Award, Star Island, NH. On December 7, 2022, he presented an IRASWebinar "Nothing at the Cosmic Beginning?" with astronomer Christopher Corbally, S.J. as a respondent.https://www.youtube.com/watch?v=4gc3kVY1l78

He established the Paul and Auburn Carr Scholarship in Science and Religion at the Boston University School of Theology in commemoration of his father, Rev. Auburn J. Carr (d. 1985), who graduated in 1932.

Paul published his autobiography "Loves in My Life: Spirituality, Science, Family" on June 12, 2023, with 51 color and 34 grayscale illustrations on Amazon.com.

In 2024, the American Scientific Affiliation elected Paul to become a Fellow.

In January 2025, Paul published "Containing Climate Change to Save Us' on https://www.amazon.com/dp/B0DV9CSPMH.

== Personal ==
He and his wife, Karin Hansen Carr (1940–1986), raised five daughters. He married Virginia Kilpack in 2004.
