= Bulfinch Triangle Historic District =

Historic district in Massachusetts, United States

- U.S. National Register of Historic Places
- U.S. Historic district
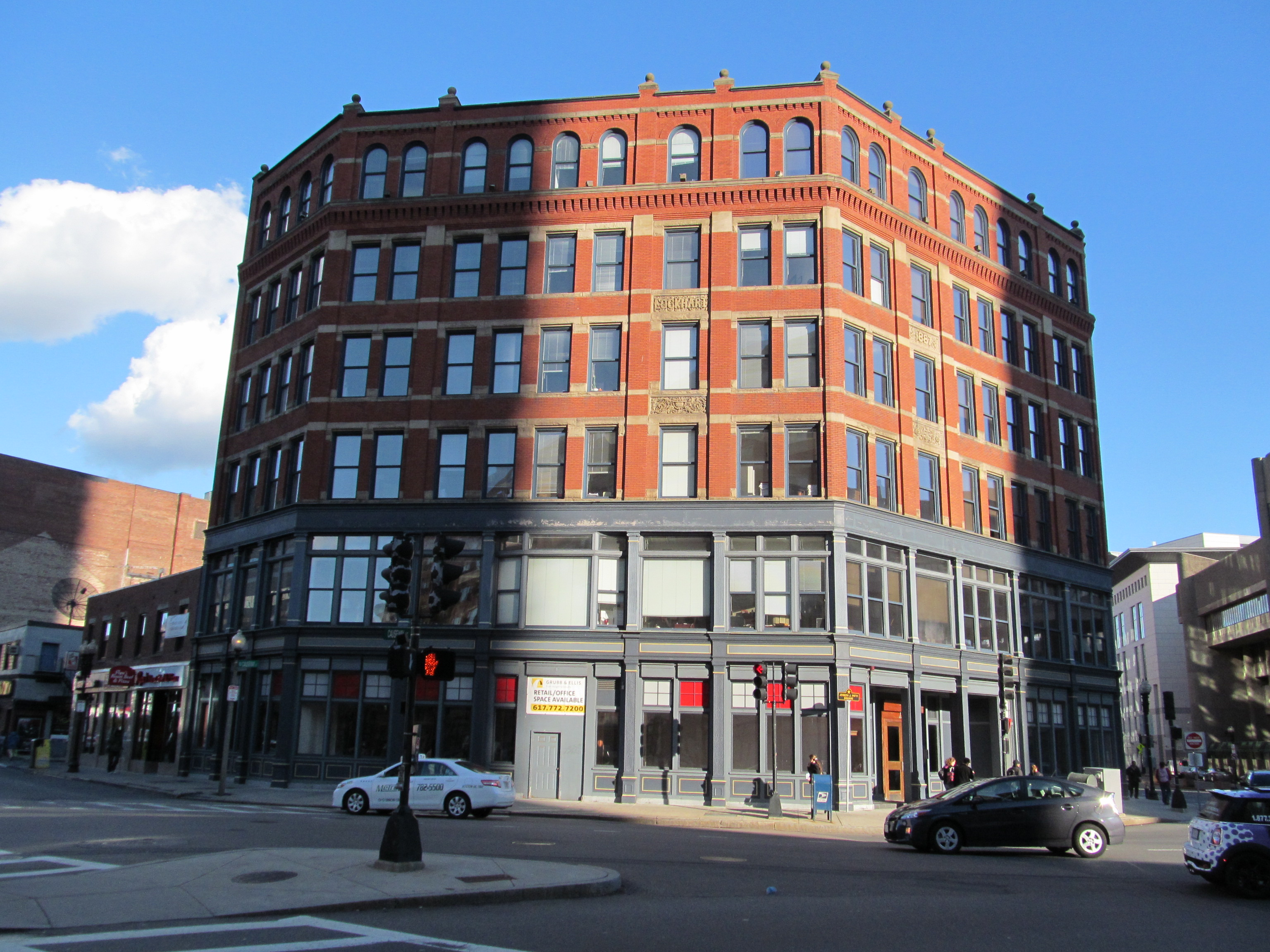
- 1887 Lockhart Building

- Location within Boston Location within Massachusetts Location within the United States
- Location: West End, Boston, Massachusetts
- Coordinates: 42°21′50″N 71°3′41″W
- Area: 7 acres (2.8 ha)
- Architect: Bulfinch, Charles
- Architectural style: Beaux Arts, Second Empire, Romanesque
- NRHP reference No.: 86000274
- Added to NRHP: February 27, 1986

The Bulfinch Triangle Historic District is a historic district roughly bounded by Canal, Market, Merrimac, and Causeway Streets in the West End of Boston, Massachusetts. The entire district was laid out by architect Charles Bulfinch on land reclaimed from the old Mill Pond (also known as North Cove), and is now populated by well-preserved commercial buildings from the 1870s through early 1900s. It was added to the National Register of Historic Places in 1986.

== Description and history ==
The Bulfinch Triangle area is located north of Boston's Government Center area, with the TD Garden to the north, the North End to the east, and the West End to the west. The historic district is bounded on the north by Causeway Street, the east by Canal Street, and the southwest by Merrimac Street. This area was in colonial times under water, in a part of the Charles River known as North Cove which separated the North and West Ends. It was a tidal flat that was filled in beginning in 1807, with its northern edge forming Causeway Street. Architect Charles Bulfinch designed the street layout for the landowners, and the area was filled with material taken by lowering Beacon Hill and Copp's Hill. The area became a nexus for a number of early railroads, serving points north and west of the city, which prompted its further development as a manufacturing area. The rail stations were eventually consolidated into North Station. By the late 19th century it was a center of Boston's furniture trade, with manufacturing and sales showrooms in integrated buildings.

The 59 buildings in the district are mostly five or six stories in height, and are built of brick and stone. Stylistically, many of them show elements of the Renaissance Revival, which was particularly popular in the last quarter of the 19th century. There is a particularly fine example of Second Empire architecture at 48–72 Canal Street, designed by Gridley J. F. Bryant and completed in 1871 for the Paine Furniture Company. There are a number of good examples of the Beaux Arts style, including two on Portland Street designed by Stephen Codman. A number of older buildings (dating to the mid-19th century) line part of Causeway Street, but have been compromised by removal of their upper floors and modernization of their facades.

With the construction of the Charlestown High Bridge and aerial John F. Fitzgerald Expressway/Central Artery during the 1950s roughly the eastern 1/3rd of the Bullfinch Triangle was occupied by the expressway and its associated on/off ramps. Through the completion of the Big Dig project in the early 21st-century much of this reclaimed area in the Triangle area was initially turned into park area as part of the Rose Kennedy Greenway before new subsequent proposed hotels and luxury properties were constructed and/or renovated.

== See also ==
- National Register of Historic Places listings in northern Boston, Massachusetts
