= Margaret Shea (scientist) =

Space scientist

Margaret Ann Shea
- Education: University of New Hampshire; University of Tasmania, Australia
- Scientific career
- Workplaces: Air Force Research Laboratory
- Thesis: Cosmic ray cutoff rigidities and associated solar-terrestrial phenomena (2001)

Margaret Ann ("Peggy") Shea is a space scientist known for research on the connections between cosmic radiation and Earth's magnetic field.

== Education and career ==
Shea graduated from Portsmouth High School (New Hampshire) in 1954 and was the top student in her high school math and physics classes. In college, she monitored cosmic rays in New Hampshire and was one of three women who entered the College of Technology at the University of New Hampshire. On the first day of an engineering class the instructor announced "Well, fellas, we've got two girls in here. How fast can we get 'em out?" She persisted and earned an undergraduate degree in 1958 and a masters in 1961, when she was the first women to earn an advanced degree in the physics department at the University of New Hampshire. She worked briefly at the University of Hawaii and AVCO Corporation. In 1964 she joined the Air Force Cambridge Research Laboratories. Shea earned a D.Sc. from the University of Tasmania, Australia, in 2001; at the time she was 64 years old. Shea became an emeritus scientist at the Air Force Cambridge Research Laboratories. In 2018, the College of Engineering and Physical Sciences at the University of New Hampshire honored her with the Distinguished Alumni Award and an honorary degree.

As of 2021, she is co-editor for special issues of Advances in Space Research.

== Research ==
Shea is known for her research connecting cosmic rays, solar particles, and the Earth's magnetic field. Her research on vertical cutoff rigidities led to the development of a computer program, the Geomagnetic Cutoff Rigidity Computer Program, which set the standard for the amount of radiation that pilots and astronauts can encounter. Shea's research includes an investigation into the Solar storm of August 1972 which set off a Coronal mass ejection, magnetized clouds of gas, which caused mines to detonate in Vietnam. Shea has also worked on solar cosmic ray events in ice and considered the changes in solar proton events over the time period from 1561 to 1950, which included comparisons to the Carrington Event, a solar flare that occurred in September 1859.

=== Selected publications ===
- Shea, M. A.; Smart, D. F.; McCracken, K. G. (1965-09-01). "A study of vertical cutoff rigidities using sixth degree simulations of the geomagnetic field". Journal of Geophysical Research. 70 (17): 4117–4130. Bibcode:1965JGR....70.4117S. doi:10.1029/JZ070i017p04117. hdl:2027/mdp.39015095127786.
- Shea, M. A.; Smart, D. F. (1990). "A summary of major solar proton events". Solar Physics. 127 (2): 297–320. Bibcode:1990SoPh..127..297S. doi:10.1007/BF00152170. ISSN 0038-0938. S2CID 120707293.
- Tylka, A.J.; Adams, J.H.; Boberg, P.R.; Brownstein, B.; Dietrich, W.F.; Flueckiger, E.O.; Petersen, E.L.; Shea, M.A.; Smart, D.F.; Smith, E.C. (1997). "CREME96: A Revision of the Cosmic Ray Effects on Micro-Electronics Code". IEEE Transactions on Nuclear Science. 44 (6): 2150–2160. doi:10.1109/23.659030. ISSN 0018-9499.
- Shea, M.A. (2000). "Fifty years of cosmic radiation data". Space Science Reviews. 93 (1/2): 229–262. Bibcode:2000SSRv...93..229S. doi:10.1023/A:1026500713452. S2CID 189770159.
- Shea, M.A.; Smart, D.F.; McCracken, K.G.; Dreschhoff, G.A.M.; Spence, H.E. (2006). "Solar proton events for 450 years: The Carrington event in perspective". Advances in Space Research. 38 (2): 232–238. Bibcode:2006AdSpR..38..232S. doi:10.1016/j.asr.2005.02.100.

== Awards and honors ==
- Soviet Union, Academy of Science Medal
- Guenter Loeser Memorial Award (1985)
- Waldo E. Smith Medal, American Geophysical Union (1988)
- Fellow, American Geophysical Union (1988)
- Foreign Associate, Royal Astronomical Society (1991)
- Corresponding member, International Academy of Astronautics (1995)
- Committee on Space Research, Distinguished Service Medal (2010)
- Distinguished Alumni, University of New Hampshire (2018)
- Eugene Parker Lecture, American Geophysical Union (2019)

== Personal life ==
Shea is married to Don Smart, a fellow space scientist.
