= Cincinnati Street Gas Lamps =

- U.S. National Register of Historic Places
- U.S. Historic district
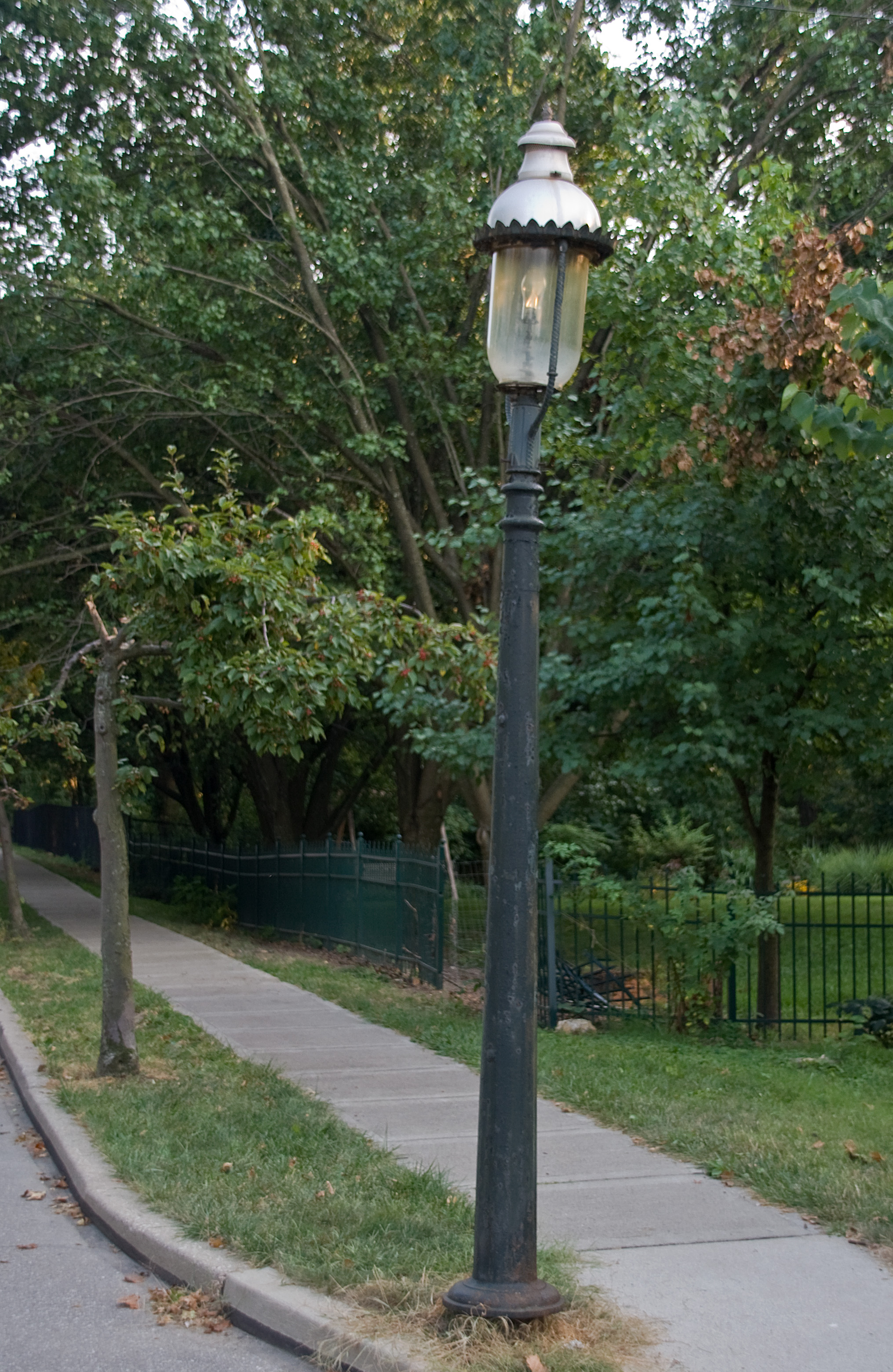
- A street lamp in Clifton

- Location within Ohio Location within the United States
- Location: 1109 street lamps at various locations throughout Cincinnati, Ohio
- Area: 0 acres (0 ha)
- Built: 1843
- NRHP reference No.: 78002073
- Added to NRHP: December 22, 1978

The Cincinnati Street Gas Lamps are a historic district in Cincinnati, Ohio, United States. Composed of more than 1,100 street lamps scattered throughout the city, the district was added to the National Register of Historic Places in 1978.

Cincinnati's system of streetlights has been seen as historic because it is representative of the application of early- to mid-nineteenth-century technology to daily life. Prompted by a newly founded firm known as the "Cincinnati Gas Light and Coke Company," the city of Cincinnati began to implement streetlights in 1837. An 1875 inventory counted 5290 public gas lamps connected by 170 miles (270 km) of mains and supply pipes. Today, perhaps 1,172 gas lights are in place in thirteen of the city's neighborhoods, as well as in certain portions of Columbia Township and Sycamore Township. Included in the historic district are 1,109 of these lights, the oldest of which date back to 1843.

== See also ==
- History of street lighting in the United States
