= West Ender Newsletter =

Boston-based newspaper

The West Ender is a Boston-based newspaper founded in 1985 by Jim Campano, who still serves as the editor and publisher.

== History ==
The paper was created for former residents of the West End, who had been displaced by the urban renewal, and others interested in the controversy. To this day the paper's tagline reads, “Printed in the Spirit of the Mid-Town Journal and Dedicated to Being the Collective Conscience of Urban Renewal and Eminent Domain in the City of Boston.”

The West Ender publishes a variety of contents including, letters between people searching for long lost neighbors and schoolmates, letters to the editor about having reconnected with other West Enders and other stories, local news, old photographs, and obituaries.

Leonard Nimoy, a former West End resident, was known to support this and other ventures to chronicle the Old West End's history and culture.

== Circulation ==
The first issue came out in March 1985. The paper continues to go out quarterly; however, in 1986, 1992, 1994, and 2009, special issues were published in addition to the regular four. While the paper began with only 125 subscribers, its highest circulation reached 4,400. For the first four years of publication, from 1985 to 1988, the paper went out in an eight and a half by eleven inch format. In 1989 it switched to a typical newspaper format, and continues to be published that way as of June 2011, when volume 27, issue 2 came out.
