= Nashua Street Park =

Park in Boston, Massachusetts, U.S.

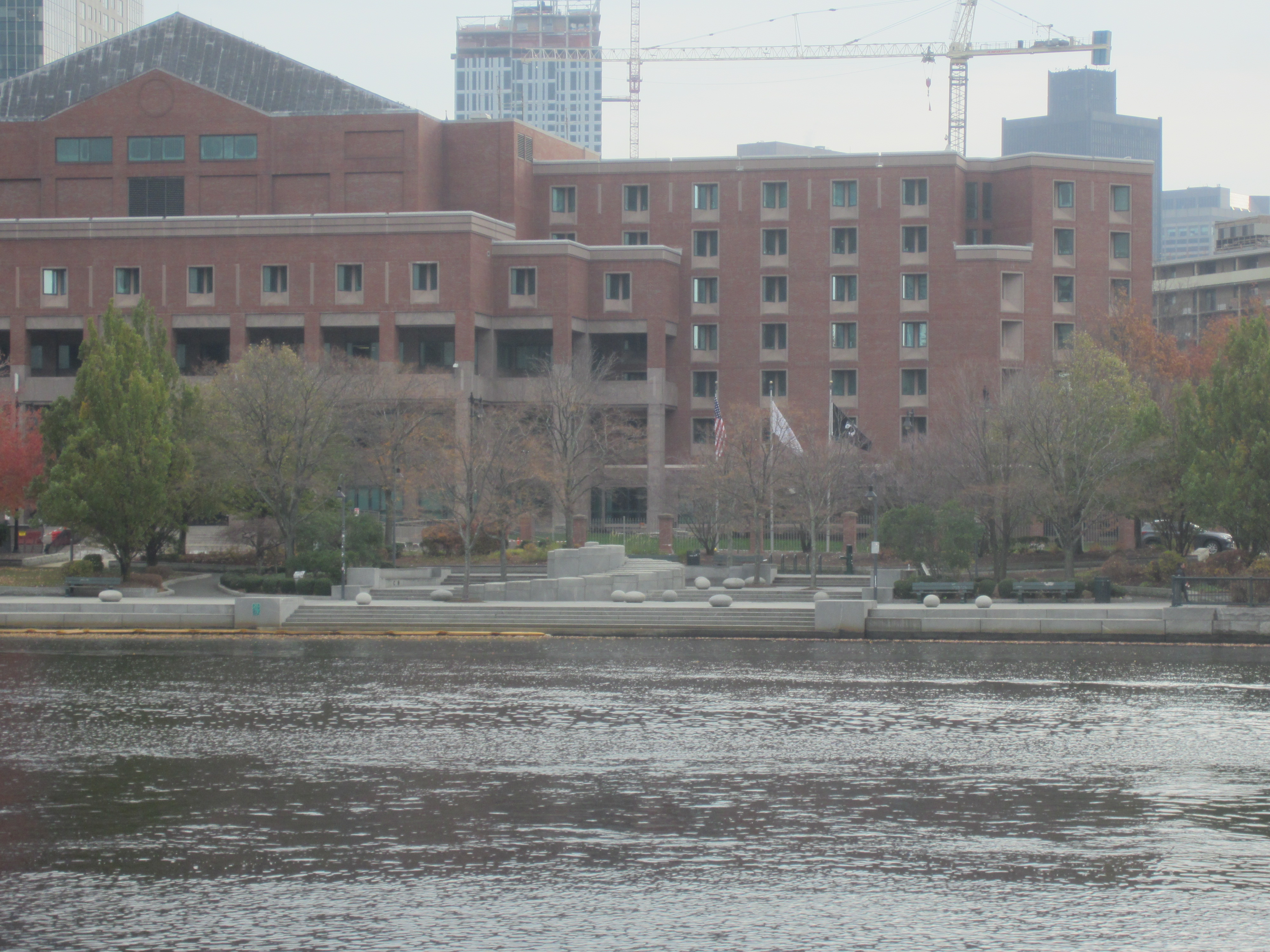
- View of the park from across the Charles River, 2019

- Location within Boston
- Location: Boston, Massachusetts, U.S.
- Coordinates: 42.3677°N 71.0667°W

Nashua Street Park is a park in Boston, along the Charles River, in the U.S. state of Massachusetts. It was designed by the Halvorson Tighe & Bond Studio and constructed by McCourt Construction for the Department of Conservation and Recreation.
