= 42 Lomasney Way =

Tenement brownstone building from Boston's old West End

Coordinates: 42°21′55.51″N 71°3′51.62″W

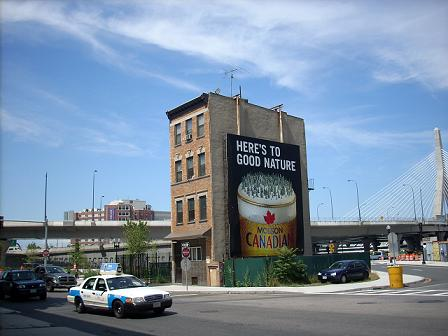
The building in the late 2000s

42 Lomasney Way is a tenement brownstone located in Boston's West End. Built in the 1870s, the building has been called The Last Tenement, as it is the only building that was not demolished during the West End's redevelopment phase or subsequent construction periods.

== History ==
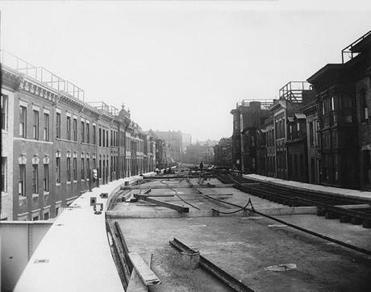
Construction of the Causeway Street Elevated, with 42 Lowell Street on the left

Located on nine hundred square feet of land to the west of TD Garden, the building was constructed in the 1870s at 42 Lowell Street. During the 1880 Census, four families were recorded as living there, which added up to twenty residents. When originally built, the building was constructed alongside thirty similar brownstones, none of which survive to this day. Over the years, the building was recorded as having upwards of fifty residents, including immigrants from Ireland, China, and Russia. In 1892, the building survived a stove flare up on the second floor, and survived a fire on the first floor in 1905. In 1911, the Causeway Street Elevated was constructed right in front of the building.

During the 1950s, the West End was considered blighted, and proposals were drawn up to redevelop the neighborhood. Already, multiple buildings along the row had been demolished, either to put in a road or a parking lot. Multiple stories exist as to why the building was not demolished, including strings being pulled with city officials, or protests by residents of the building.

Following the redevelopment of the West End, the building was occupied for some time by an associate of the Angiulo Brothers, which was a leading gang in the North End until the Winter Hill Gang decided to run rackets in the area. Since then, the building has been purchased and redeveloped by a private owner. The City of Boston estimates the property's value at roughly $1.6 million as of 2021.
