= Cabot family =

Boston Brahmin family

- Current region: Boston, United States
- Origin: Jersey
- Founder: John Cabot (b.1680)
- Connected families: Lowell; Lodge; Forbes
- Estates: John Cabot House; Eleanor Cabot Bradley Estate; Lewis Cabot Estate; Henry Cabot Lodge House; Cabotville, North Haven, Maine

The Cabot family is an American family based in Boston and Massachusetts whose members have been prominent in the fields of politics, shipping, finance, academics, medicine, and philosophy. They are considered a Boston Brahmin family, one of the "first families of Boston," and their name caps the famous and often-quoted Boston toast by John Collins Bossidy:

And this is good old Boston,
The home of the bean and the cod,
Where the Lowells talk only to Cabots,
And the Cabots talk only to God.

The Cabot family in the United States began with the 1700 emigration of John Cabot from the isle of Jersey to Salem, Massachusetts, where he established a successful shipping firm, which remained the core of the family business for many generations. Descendants of John Cabot and his son, Joseph, include at least three United States Senators, two governors of Massachusetts, three ambassadors of the United States, and one governor of Connecticut, and the wife of future United States president Theodore Roosevelt. Companies or institutions founded by his direct descendants include the Lowell mills, the Groton School, the Porcellian Club, the Cabot Corporation, Lee, Higginson & Co., State Street Corporation, and Samuel Cabot Inc.

The family has long been closely associated with Harvard University, where many members have studied and where Cabot House is named after Thomas Dudley Cabot.

== History ==
=== Origins ===
The Cabot family in the United States descended from John Cabot, who was born in 1680 on the island of Jersey in the English Channel, and emigrated to Salem, Massachusetts in 1700. In Jersey, the family name can be traced to at least 1274, and various explanations have been given for its origin. Jersey historian George Reginald Balleine noted that in Latin, caput means "head", and in Jersey, the "cabot" is a small fish that seems all head, leading to speculation that the name is linked to the family's involvement in fishing or the size of an ancestor's head. Guy Fortescue Burrell de Gruchy, president of La Société Jersiaise, also recorded "cabot" as meaning "big-head." Another theory posits that the name is derived from cabot as a measurement of cereal, and Cabot may have been an occupational surname given to someone who measured cereal.

In French, once a common language in Jersey, "cabot" means a dog or a military corporal, "caboter" is to navigate along the coast, and "cabotin" means "theatrical".

=== Migration to British America and first generations in Salem ===
Following his 1700 emigration to Salem, John Cabot became a highly successful merchant, and with his sons, Francis (b. 1717) and Joseph (b. 1720), operated a fleet of privateers carrying opium, rum, and slaves. His daughter, Elizabeth (b. 1715), married into the Higginson family, and her son, Stephen Higginson, would later become a member of the Continental Congress.

Elizabeth's and Francis's daughters, Sarah and Susanna (respectively), each successively married John Lowell, and the Cabot family became connected to the Lowell family, each giving birth to a son. Sarah was the mother of John Lowell Jr., who became a prominent Boston lawyer, and Susanna was the mother of Francis Cabot Lowell, a leading pioneer in American manufacturing and the use of the corporate form in business.

Joseph Cabot had five sons:

- John Cabot (b. 1745), who cofounded the first cotton mill in the United States
- Joseph Cabot Jr. (b. 1746)
- George Cabot (b. 1752), who represented Massachusetts in the United States Senate
- Francis Cabot (b. 1757)
- Samuel Cabot (b. 1758)

Joseph, George, and Samuel each studied at Harvard College before joining the family business and expanding the family's shipping fortune.

Following the success of the American Revolution, in which the Cabots supported the rebellion by supplying ships and smuggling contraband through British naval blockades, the family became more prominent and wealthy still, as many of the older, leading families of Massachusetts had been loyal to the Crown and were forced to flee to England or Canada. Two early Supreme Court of the United States cases, Bingham v. Cabot (1795) and Bingham v. Cabot (1798), involved family shipping disputes.

=== Francis Cabot branch ===
Francis Cabot's daughter, Mary Ann (b. 1784), married her first cousin, Nathaniel Cabot Lee. Their son, John Clarke Lee, founded the brokerage firm of Lee, Higginson & Co. His grandchildren included Endicott Peabody, who founded the Groton School; Alice Hathaway Roosevelt, the first wife of Theodore Roosevelt; George Cabot Lee Jr., who later led the brokerage firm; and Endicott Peabody Saltonstall, district attorney of Middlesex County. John Clarke Lee's great-grandchildren included two governors of Massachusetts, Endicott Peabody and Leverett Saltonstall.

Descendants of Francis Cabot's son, Frederick (b. 1786), later moved the family to New York City, where Francis Higginson Cabot was born in 1925. He later founded The Garden Conservancy.

=== George Cabot branch ===
George, the third son of Joseph Cabot, was the most prominent of his generation. He was elected to the United States Senate, where he was an ally of George Washington and Alexander Hamilton. George's descendants followed him into politics, particularly his great-grandson, Henry Cabot Lodge, who also served in the Senate from 1893 until 1924. Lodge's grandson, Henry Jr., likewise served between 1937 and 1953, and another grandson, John Davis Lodge, was the governor of Connecticut. Henry Jr.'s son, named George Cabot Lodge II, ran unsuccessfully for United States Senate in 1962.

=== Samuel Cabot branch ===
The largest and most significant branch of the family is descended from Joseph Cabot's youngest son, Samuel, who moved the family to Boston in 1784. His son, Samuel Jr., was shortly born. Samuel Jr. expanded the family fortune significantly by developing early American trading networks with China, including through his 1812 marriage to Eliza Perkins, the daughter of a more prominent merchant, Thomas Handasyd Perkins, making the combined Perkins-Cabot fortune one of the very largest in Boston. Samuel Sr.'s daughter, Eliza Lee (b. 1787), married German patriot and radical Charles Follen, and they became leading figures in the early abolitionist movement against slavery in Boston.

Samuel Jr. had several notable children and descendants:

- Samuel Cabot III (b. 1815), eminent surgeon and ornithologist
- Edward Clarke Cabot (b. 1818), architect and artist
- Elizabeth Cabot Ware (b. 1819), benefactor of the Harvard botanical department and co-sponsor of the famous Glass Flowers exhibit
- James Elliot Cabot (b. 1821), philosopher and author
- Walter Channing Cabot (b. 1829)

Samuel III's children were also prominent figures in Boston society, including Lilla (b. 1848), an Impressionist painter; Samuel IV (b. 1850), chemist and founder of Samuel Cabot Inc.; Arthur Tracy (b. 1852), a leading surgeon; and Godfrey Lowell (b. 1861), founder of the Cabot Corporation, America's largest producer of carbon black. Godfrey Cabot Lowell's children include Thomas Dudley Cabot, the namesake of Cabot House; and John Moors Cabot, a diplomat to Europe and South America during the John F. Kennedy and Lyndon B. Johnson administrations.

Walter Channing Cabot's grandsons, Paul Codman Cabot and Charles Codman Cabot, were prominent in Boston politics and business. Paul founded the State Street Corporation, and Charles was an associate justice of the Supreme Court of Massachusetts.

=== Kabotchnik v. Cabot ===
In 1923, Harry H. Kabotchnik and his wife Myrtle petitioned to have his family name changed to Cabot. Some prominent Cabots of Boston (Judge Cabot of the Boston Juvenile Court; Stephen Cabot, headmaster of St. George's School, Middletown, R.I.; Dr. Hugh Cabot, dean of University of Michigan Medical School) along with the Pennsylvania branch of the Order of the Founders and Patriots, the Historical Society of Pennsylvania, and the Genealogical Society of Pennsylvania counter-sued to prevent the change. Judge Charles Young Audenried eventually ruled for the Kabotchniks, as there was "nothing in the law to prevent it."

=== Boston Toast ===
The widely known "Boston Toast" by Holy Cross alumnus John Collins Bossidy features the Cabot family:

And this is good old Boston,
The home of the bean and the cod,
Where the Lowells talk only to Cabots,
And the Cabots talk only to God.

== Members ==
- John Cabot (b. 1680 in Isle of Jersey) - successful ship merchant
  - Elizabeth Cabot (b. 1715), married Stephen H. Higginson
    - Stephen Higginson (b. 1743)
    - Sarah Higginson (b. 1745), first wife of John Lowell
      - John Lowell Jr. (b. 1769)
  - Francis Cabot (b. 1717 in Salem) – ship merchant
    - Susanna Cabot (b. 1754), second wife of John Lowell
      - Francis Cabot Lowell (b. 1775 in Newburyport) – cofounded Harvard's Porcellian Club, helped introduce power loom in U.S.
  - Joseph Cabot (b. 1720 in Salem) – successful ship merchant
    - Capt. John Cabot (b. 1745 in Salem) – cofounded America's first cotton mill, John Cabot House namesake
    - Joseph Cabot Jr. (b. 1746 in Salem) – ship merchant
    - George Cabot (b. 1752 in Salem) – successful ship merchant, U.S. Senator from Massachusetts, appointed but declined to be first Secretary of the Navy
      - Henry Cabot (b. 1783)
        - Anna Cabot (b. 1821)
          - Henry Cabot Lodge (b. 1850 in Boston) – U.S. Senator from Massachusetts and ardent opponent of Woodrow Wilson's League of Nations
            - George Cabot Lodge (b. 1873 in Boston) – poet
              - Henry Cabot Lodge Jr. (b. 1902 in Nahant, MA) – U.S. Senator from Massachusetts, incumbent 1952 U.S. Senate candidate from Massachusetts against John F. Kennedy, U.S. Ambassador to United Nations and South Vietnam, and 1960 vice presidential candidate for Richard Nixon against Kennedy–Lyndon B. Johnson
                - George Cabot Lodge II (b. 1927) – Harvard Business School professor, 1962 U.S. Senate candidate from Massachusetts against Edward M. Kennedy
              - John Davis Lodge (b. 1903 in Washington, D.C.) – 64th governor of Connecticut
    - Francis Cabot (b. 1757 in Salem)
      - Mary Ann Cabot (b. 1784) - married her first cousin, Nathaniel Cabot Lee (b. 1772), son of Joseph Lee and Elizabeth Cabot (daughter of Joseph Cabot)
        - John Clarke Lee (b. 1804 in Boston)
          - George Cabot Lee (b. 1830 in Boston)
            - Alice Hathaway Lee Roosevelt (b. 1861), first wife of President Theodore Roosevelt
      - Frederick Cabot (b. 1786 in Salem)
        - Francis Cabot (b. 1825 in Newton, Massachusetts)
          - Francis Higginson Cabot (b. 1859 in Boston)
            - Francis Higginson Cabot (b. 1896) — vice president, Stone & Webster
              - Francis Higginson Cabot (b. 1925 in New York City) — noted gardener and horticulturist
    - Samuel Cabot (b. 1758 in Salem) — successful ship merchant
      - Samuel Cabot Jr. (b. 1784 in Boston) — shipping businessman
        - Samuel Cabot III (b. 1815 in Boston) – eminent surgeon
          - Lilla Cabot (b. 1848 in Boston) – among first American impressionist artists, contributor to Museum of Fine Arts, Boston
          - Samuel Cabot IV (b. 1850) – chemist, founder of Samuel Cabot Inc. that produces Cabot Stains which would later be purchased by Valspar
          - Arthur Tracy Cabot (b. 1852 in Boston) – progressive surgeon
          - Godfrey Lowell Cabot (b. 1861 in Boston) – founder of Cabot Corporation, philanthropist who sponsored the restoration of the Harvard Museum of Comparative Zoology's complete Kronosaurus skeleton.
            - James Jackson Cabot (b. 1891 in Cambridge)
            - Thomas Dudley Cabot (b. 1897 in Cambridge) – businessman and philanthropist, Cabot House namesake
              - Louis Wellington Cabot – businessman, philanthropist, former chairman of Federal Reserve Bank of Boston, married Mabel Hobart
              - Linda Cabot Black – cofounder of Opera Company of Boston and Opera New England
                - Sophie Cabot Black (b. 1958) – poet
            - John Moors Cabot (b. 1901 in Cambridge) – U.S. Ambassador to Sweden, Colombia, Brazil, and Poland during the Eisenhower and Kennedy administrations
              - Lewis P. Cabot -Busunessman and art collector
              - John G. L. Cabot
                - Andrew Cabot – CEO and COO of Privateer Rum, married Kristin Thornby in 2023
            - Eleanor Cabot – Eleanor Cabot Bradley Estate namesake
        - Edward Clarke Cabot (b. 1818) — architect and artist
        - Elizabeth Cabot Lee (b. 1819 in Boston) — philanthropist and co-sponsor of the Harvard Museum of Natural History's famous Glass Flowers exhibit. Widely known as Elizabeth C. Ware (her married name).
        - James Elliot Cabot (b. 1821 in Boston) — philosopher and author
          - Charles Mills Cabot (b. 1866 in Brookline, Massachusetts) founder of the investment firm Moors & Cabot.
            - Elliot Cabot (b. 1899 in Boston) — actor
          - Richard Clarke Cabot (b. 1868 in Brookline) — clinical physician, social work pioneer
          - Hugh Cabot (b. 1872 in Beverly Farms) – surgeon and educator
            - Hugh Cabot (b. 1905 in Boston)
              - Hugh Cabot III (b. 1930 in Boston) — painter
        - Walter Channing Cabot (b. 1829)
          - Henry Bromfield Cabot (b. 1861 in Boston) – lawyer
            - Paul Codman Cabot (b. 1898 in Brookline)
            - Charles Codman Cabot (b. 1900 in Brookline) — associate judge of the Supreme Court of Massachusetts, Boston Bar Association president
          - Elise Cabot Forbes (b. 1869) — maternal grandmother of Michael Paine
      - Eliza Lee Cabot Follen (b. 1787 in Boston) – abolitionist and writer

== Cabot family network ==
=== Associates ===
The following is a list of figures closely aligned with or subordinate to the Cabot family.

- Nathan Appleton
- Samuel Bodman
- Sarah Caldwell
- Ralph Waldo Emerson
- Augustus Peabody Gardner
- Prescott F. Hall
- Alexander Hamilton
- Patrick Tracy Jackson
- Abbott Lawrence
- John Lowell
- Harrison Gray Otis
- T.H. Perkins
- Thomas S. Perry
- Josiah Quincy Jr.
- Theodore Roosevelt
- Israel Thorndike
- John Train
- Sam Zemurray

=== Businesses ===
The following is a list of companies in which the Cabot family have held a controlling or otherwise significant interest.

- Beverly Cotton Manufactory
- Boston Manufacturing Company
- Cabot, Cabot & Forbes
- Cabot Corporation
- Gulf Central Pipeline Company
- Holtzer-Cabot Electrical Company
- John & Andrew Cabot and Company
- Lee, Higginson & Co.
- Opera Company of Boston
- Samuel Cabot, Inc.
- Southworth Machine Company
- State Street Investment Corporation
- Train, Cabot & Associates
- United Fruit Company

=== Philanthropy Institutions & Miscellaneous Non-profits ===
- Aero Club of New England
- Cabot Corporation Foundation
- Cabot Family Charitable Trust
- Ella Lyman Cabot Trust
- The Garden Conservancy
- Glass Flowers
- Godfrey L. Cabot Solar Energy Conversion Research Project
- Immigration Restriction League
- Maria Moors Cabot Prize
- Massachusetts General Hospital
- Massachusetts Institute of Technology
- Paul & Virginia Cabot Charitable Trust
- Porcellian Club
- Radio Swan
- Virginia Wellington Cabot Foundation
- Watch and Ward Society

== Buildings and historic sites ==
- Cabot House (Harvard)
- Cabot Farm
- Eleanor Cabot Bradley Estate
- Jeremiah Lee Mansion
- John Cabot House
- Les Quatre Vents
- Lewis Cabot Estate
- Mount Murray
- Stonecrop Gardens

== See also ==
- List of United States political families
