= Hugh Cabot (surgeon) =

American surgeon (1872–1945)

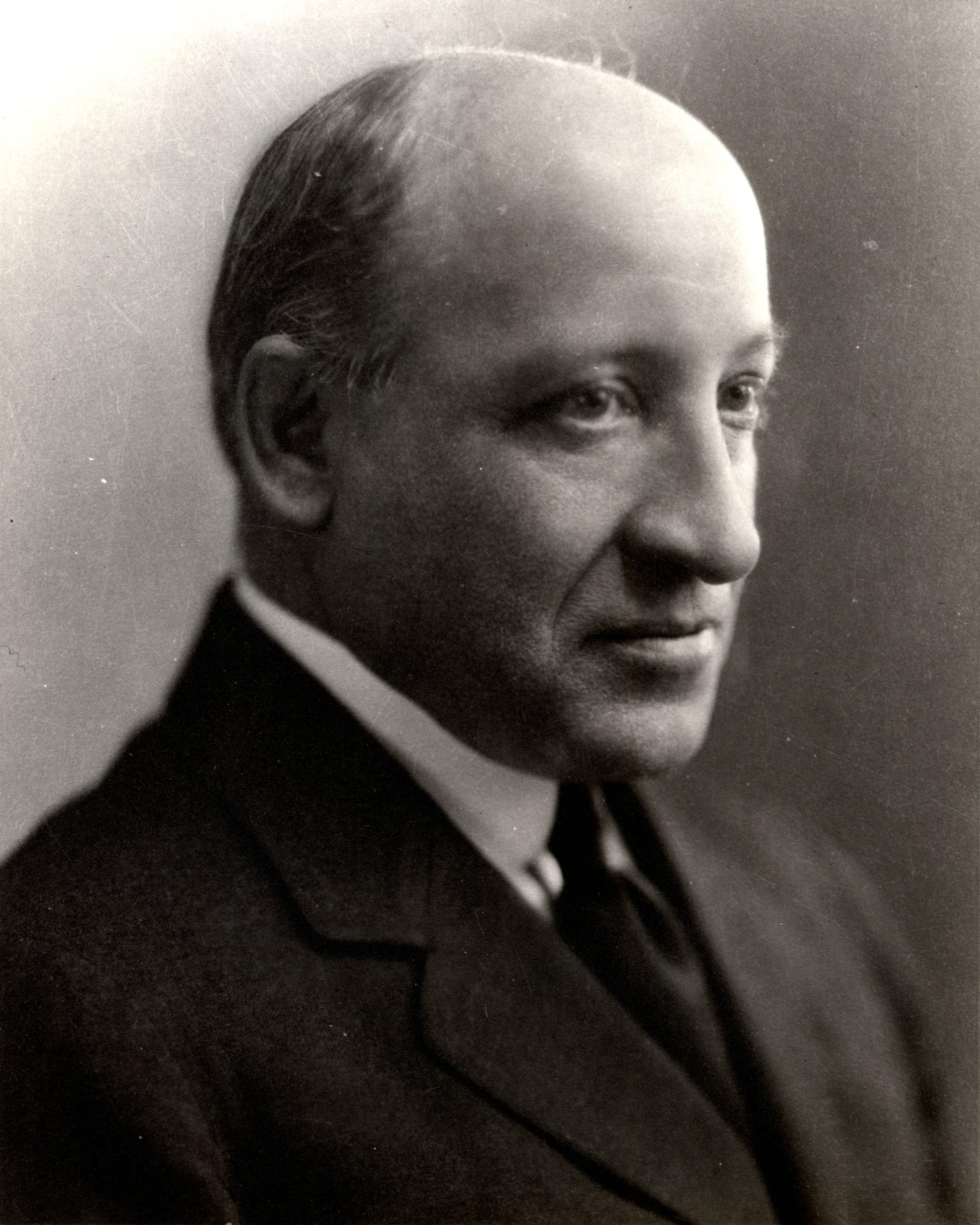
- Born: Hugh Cabot; August 11, 1872; Beverly, Massachusetts, U.S.
- Died: August 15, 1945 (aged 73); Ellsworth, Maine, U.S.
- Education: Harvard College; Harvard Medical School
- Occupation: Dean of the University of Michigan Medical School Genitourinary surgeon
- Spouses: Mary Anderson Boit (m. 1902; died 1936); Elizabeth Cole Amory (m. 1938)
- Children: 4

Hugh Cabot (August 11, 1872 – August 15, 1945) was an American surgeon and educator who was dean of the University of Michigan Medical School and a member of the staff at the Mayo Clinic. He was a specialist in genitourinary surgery and an advocate of group health care cooperatives.

== Early life ==
Cabot was born in Beverly Farms on August 11, 1872. He was the youngest of seven sons born to James Elliot Cabot and Elizabeth Dwight Cabot. His grandfathers were Samuel Cabot Jr. and Edmund Dwight. His brother, Richard Clarke Cabot, was also a noted physician. He prepared for college at Roxbury Latin School and graduated from Harvard College in 1894.

== Early career ==
Cabot graduated from Harvard Medical School in 1898 and interned at Massachusetts General Hospital. From 1899 to 1904, he was an assistant to his cousin, Dr. Arthur Tracy Cabot. From 1900 to 1919, he was a visiting surgeon at New England Baptist Hospital. He was also a visiting surgeon at Massachusetts General Hospital from 1902 to 1919, spending a decade in the outpatient department before moving to the genitourinary department in 1912.

== World War I ==
In May 1916, Cabot was the chief surgeon of the third Harvard Surgical Unit, a volunteer contingent of medical personnel from Harvard who provided medical assistance to the British Expeditionary Force in Europe during World War I. He served for six months and was succeeded by Dr. D. F. Jones in September 1916. In December 1916, the Harvard Corporation voted to have Cabot lead the unit for the remainder of the war. In 1919, he was made a companion of the Order of the Bath and the Order of St Michael and St George by George V for his service in France. The Harvard Surgical Unit was demobilized the British War Department on January 8, 1919 and returned to the United States on January 30.

== University of Michigan ==
In 1919, Victor C. Vaughan hired Cabot to lead the surgery department at the University of Michigan Medical School. When Vaughan resigned in 1921, Cabot succeeded him as dean. In 1925, he was elected president of the Association of American Medical Colleges. In 1930, a faculty revolt led president Alexander Grant Ruthven to request that Cabot step down. Cabot refused and on February 8, 1930, the Regents of the University of Michigan voted to remove him as dean. He was succeeded by Frederick Amasa Coller.

== Later career ==
From 1929 to 1935, Cabot was a member of the Harvard Board of Overseers. From 1930 to 1939, he was a professor of surgery at the University of Minnesota and a surgeon at the Mayo Clinic.

Cabot was a proponent of group health care cooperatives, which he believed believed would resolve duplication, inefficiency, and high costs. He spoke to medical societies across the United States and wrote in national magazines to gain support for the plan. He also supported the budgeted prepayment of medical costs. He endorsed a proposal by the 1938 National Health Conference for the federal government to provide medical, hospital, and dental care, as well as health insurance and illness compensation. In 1940, he helped launch the White Cross Health Service, a non-profit organization that would provide medical services to low income people in Greater Boston on the basis of a monthly subscription.

== Personal life and death ==
On September 22, 1902, Cabot married Mary Anderson Boit in Brookline, Massachusetts. She was the daughter of Robert Apthorp Boit, a cotton broker from Savannah, Georgia who moved to Boston and worked in the insurance business, and the granddaughter of Confederate States Army Brigadier General Hugh W. Mercer. They had four children:

- Hugh Cabot Jr. (1905–1967), investment firm manager, research fellow and lecturer at Harvard College and Harvard Business School, and executive director of the Age Center of New England. Father of Hugh Cabot III.
- Mary Anderson Cabot (1907–1924), died at the age of sixteen after becoming ill on a world cruise,
- John Boit Cabot (1909–1972), architect
- Arthur Tracy Cabot (1916–1989), United States Air Force officer

In 1923, Cabot and other members of the Cabot family opposed a petition by Harry H. Kabotchnik and his wife Myrtle to have their surname name changed to Cabot. Judge Charles Young Audenried eventually ruled for the Kabotchniks, as there was "nothing in the law to prevent it."

Mary Boit Cabot died on October 27, 1936 in Rochester, Minnesota. On October 8, 1938, he married Elizabeth Cole Amory, widow of Walter Amory, in Hingham, Massachusetts. The two had met when Cabot treated Walter Amory at the Mayo Clinic.

Cabot died on August 15, 1945, after suffering a heart attack while sailing in Frenchman Bay with his wife.
