= Lilla Cabot Perry =

American painter

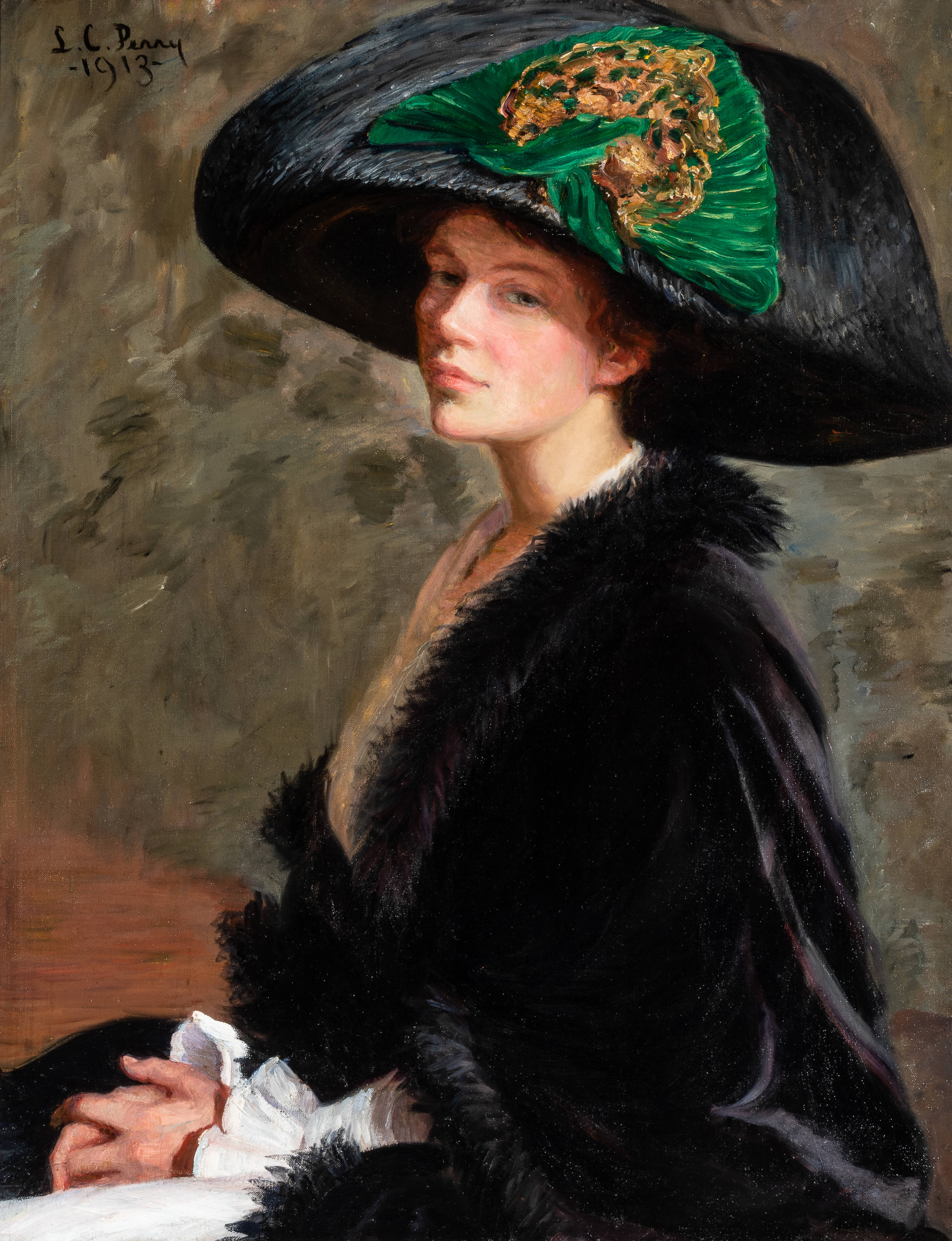
- Self portrait, The Green Hat, 1913
- Born: Lydia Cabot; January 13, 1848; Boston, Massachusetts, US
- Died: February 28, 1933 (aged 85); Hancock, New Hampshire, US
- Education: Cowles Art School; Académie Colarossi; Académie Julian
- Known for: Painting
- Movement: Impressionism
- Spouse: Thomas Sergeant Perry (m. 1874)

Lilla Cabot Perry (born Lydia Cabot; January 13, 1848 – February 28, 1933) was an American artist who worked in the American Impressionist style, rendering portraits and landscapes in the free form manner of her mentor, Claude Monet. Perry was an early advocate of the French Impressionist style and contributed to its reception in the United States. Perry's early work was shaped by her exposure to the Boston School of artists and her travels in Europe and Japan. She was also greatly influenced by Ralph Waldo Emerson's philosophies and her friendship with Camille Pissarro. Although it was not until the age of thirty-six that Perry received formal training, her work with artists of the Impressionist, Realist, Symbolist, and German Social Realist movements greatly affected the style of her oeuvre.

== Early life ==
Lydia (Lilla) Cabot was born January 13, 1848, in Boston, Massachusetts. Her father was Dr. Samuel Cabot III, a distinguished surgeon. Her mother was Hannah Lowell Jackson Cabot. She was the eldest of eight children, three being Samuel Cabot IV (b. 1850), chemist and founder of Valspar's Cabot Stains; Dr. Arthur Tracy Cabot (b. 1852), a progressive surgeon; and Godfrey Lowell Cabot (b. 1861), founder of Cabot Corporation. Her family was prominent in Boston society, and friends of the family included Louisa May Alcott, Ralph Waldo Emerson, and James Russell Lowell, who was her mother's cousin and respected Lilla's independent spirit, "scorn of ignoble things," and "alert nature." Lowell's daughter and Lilla's cousin, Mabel, was a close companion. Perry recalled having the opportunity to play the game "fox and geese" with both Emerson and Alcott. She had lending privileges at the Boston Athenæum, through her father, who was a proprietor, and her mother's family.

Perry studied literature, language, poetry, and music and had informal sketching sessions with her friends. As a child she additionally enjoyed reading books and playing sports outdoors. Perry was thirteen years old when the Civil War began. Her parents were ardent abolitionists and took an active role in the war effort by providing care to wounded soldiers and helping to protect runaway slaves. At seventeen, when the Civil War ended, Perry moved with her family to a farm in Canton, Massachusetts, where much of her early interest in landscapes and nature was shaped. She traveled with her parents in 1867 to Europe, where she studied painting.

== Marriage ==
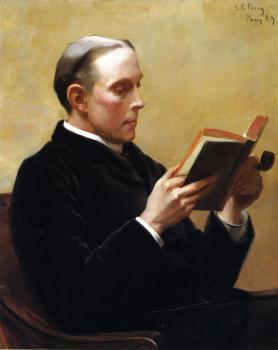
Thomas Sergeant Perry, 1889

On April 9, 1874, she married Thomas Sergeant Perry, a Harvard alumnus scholar and linguist. His granduncle was Matthew C. Perry, Commodore of the United States Navy. The couple had three daughters: Margaret (1876), Edith (1880), and Alice (1884).

== Education and early career ==
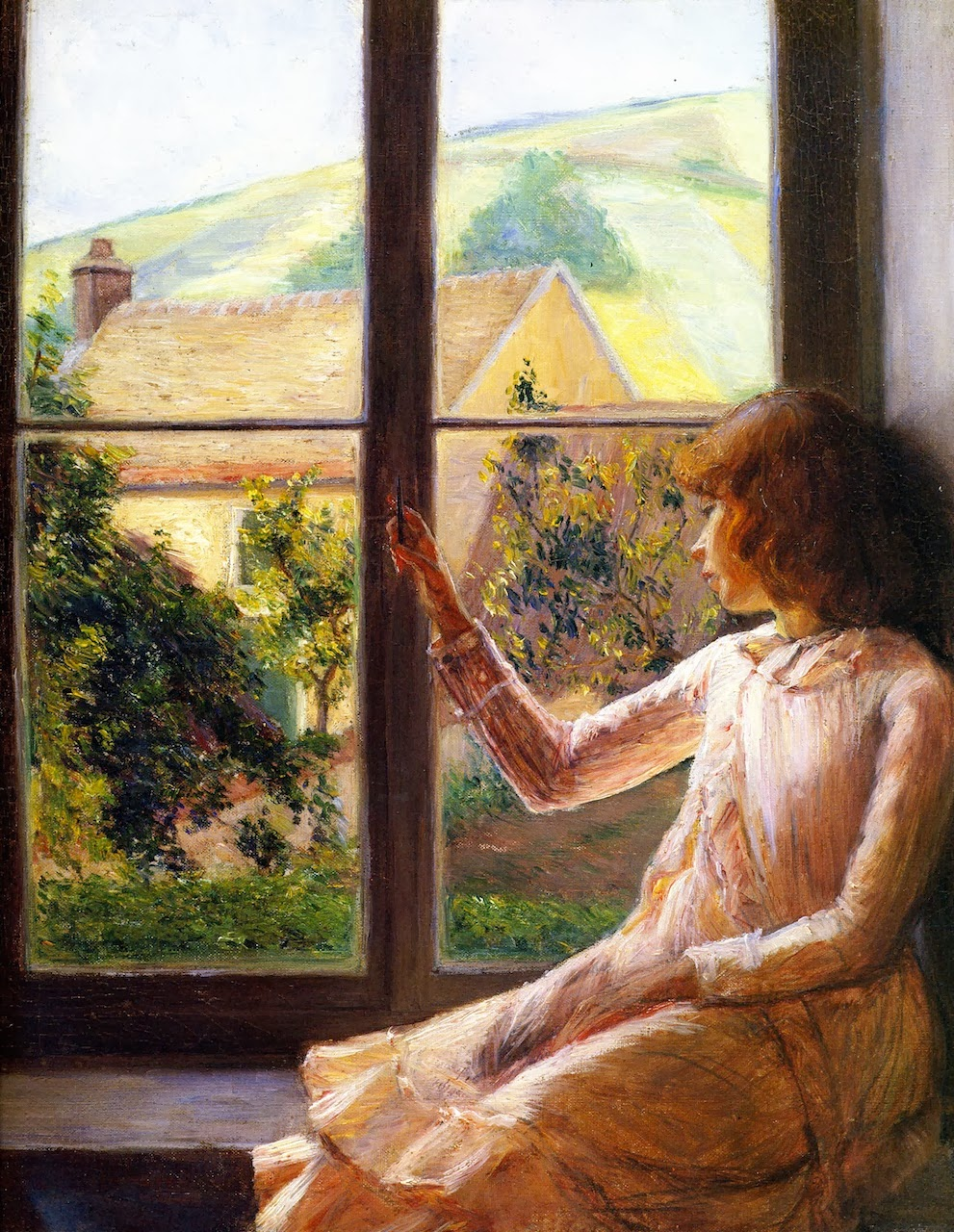
Child at the Window (Edith Perry)

Perry completed what is considered to be her earliest known painting, Portrait of an Infant (Margaret Perry) dating from 1877 to 1878. This work draws on the inspiration that would occupy much of her artwork throughout her career – her children.

=== Boston ===
In 1884, Perry began her formal artistic training with the portrait painter Alfred Quinton Collins. Collins had studied at the Académie Julian in Paris under the guidance of Léon Bonnat. Perry's The Beginner, c. 1885–86, represents the first work she completed under formal guidance. The Beginner echoes Collins’ influences with the sitter's serious gaze, dark background, and emphasis on dramatic lighting.

In 1885, Perry's father died and left her an inheritance that allowed her to more seriously study art. In January 1886, she began to study with Robert Vonnoh, an artist who worked in the Impressionist's en plein air style at Grez-sur-Loing in France. She took classes with instructor Dennis Bunker at Cowles Art School in Boston beginning in November 1886. Cowles taught its students "liberal theories" in the creation of realist art – theories that Perry greatly responded to.

=== Paris ===
Perry was commissioned by Aaron Lufkin Dennison, a founder of the Waltham Watch Company, to paint his three daughters. She earned sufficient money to travel first-class passage to Europe in June 1887. The Perrys moved to Paris that year. Perry enrolled in the Académie Colarossi, where she worked with Gustave Courtois and Joseph Blanc. She studied with Felix Borchardt, a German painter. In addition to receiving formal academic training, Perry spent much of her time studying the old masters in museums with Bernard Berenson, an art critic and her husband's friend. She also traveled to Spain to copy works at the Museo del Prado. Perry's The Red Hat from 1888 strongly reflects the formal training she had received and her exposure to the old masters, especially the work of Sandro Botticelli.

In 1888, Perry traveled to Munich, where she studied with the German social realist Fritz von Uhde. Uhde's handling of the subject and his use of color had a dynamic effect on Perry's work. By the fall of 1888, Perry had returned to Paris. She studied at Académie Julian with Tony Robert-Fleury.

With the encouragement of Walter Gay, Perry submitted two paintings she had recently completed to the Société des Artistes Indépendants. The portraits of her husband Thomas Sergeant Perry (1889) and of her daughter Edith Perry (1889) were accepted by the Salon, and with this accomplishment Perry's career began in France.

Perry's success in 1889 made it possible for her to be one of the select few admitted to Alfred Stevens' class in Paris. Stevens was known for his "elegant interiors featuring genteel ladies lost in their reveries." While in Paris, she became friends with Mary Cassatt, Camille Pissarro, and Claude Monet.

== Career ==
=== Giverny ===
In 1889, Perry first encountered Claude Monet's work in Georges Petit's gallery. Inspired by his work, the Perrys spent the next summer in Giverny, where Monet lived, in order to further expose Lilla to the Impressionist's style. Between 1889 and 1909, Perry spent nine summers in Giverny. It was there that she fully found herself as an artist. During her time in Giverny, she formed a close friendship with Claude Monet, whose impressionistic handling of color and light greatly inspired her work. In addition, she also worked with a cadre of American artists who had found their way to Giverny, including Theodore Robinson, John Leslie Breck, and Theodore Earl Butler.

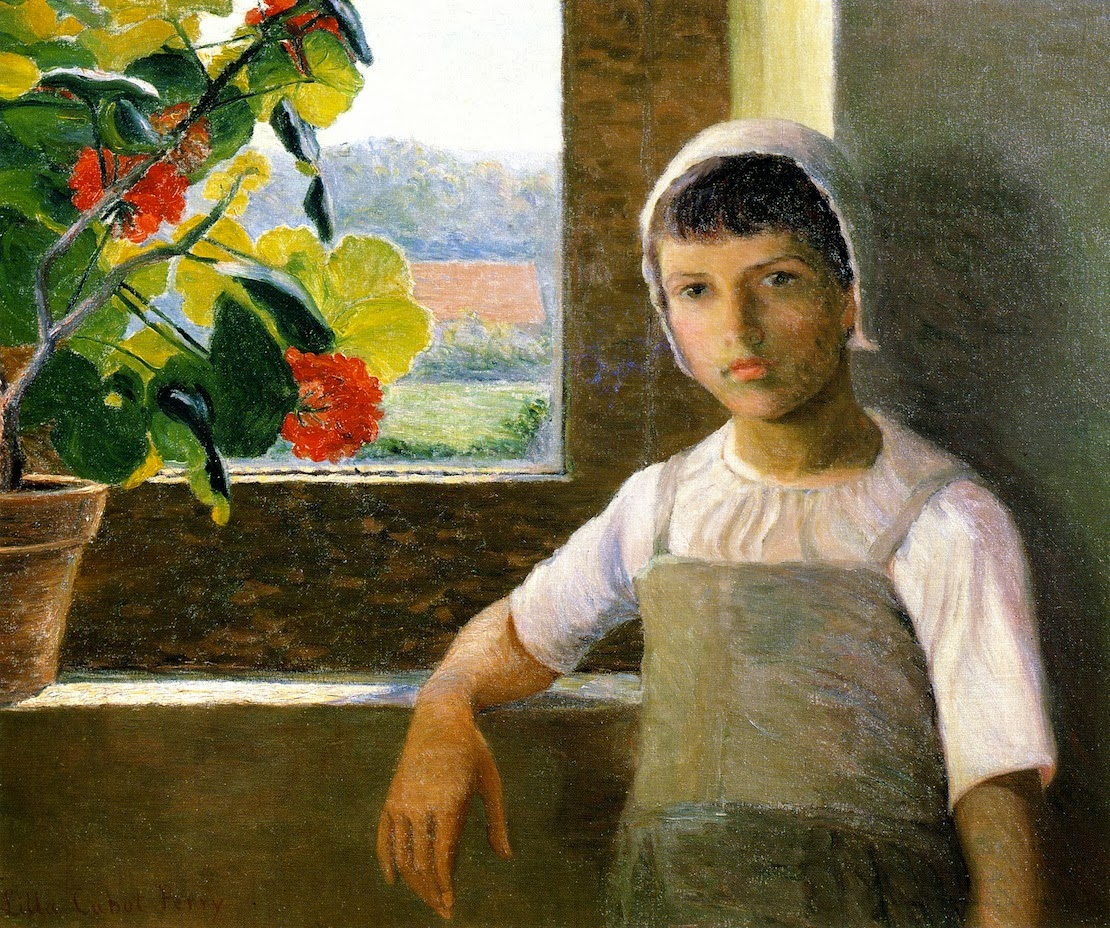
La Petite Angèle, II, 1889

A distinct shift can be observed in Perry's work after she arrived in Giverny. Her La Petite Angèle, II (1889), illustrates the dramatic evolution of her style during this period. Unlike her earlier portraits, such as The Letter, which relied on more traditional techniques to carefully render the subject matter, La Petite Angèle, II, is clearly impressionistic in style with its free form brushstrokes that capture the impression of light and color. Rather than blending together each brushstroke, Perry allowed the composition to be "raw," thus allowing a vibrancy to be imbued in the canvas that was not possible in her earlier works. Giverny and, more specifically, Claude Monet inspired Perry to work with en plein air forms, impressionistic brushstrokes, soft colors, and poppy red. In the window of La Petite Angèle, II, we see the beginnings of what would become Perry's love affair with the Impressionist's handling of the landscape theme.

By the fall of 1889, Perry had departed from Giverny to tour Belgium and the Netherlands. She had returned to Boston with her family in 1891 with a painting by Monet and a series of landscapes by John Breck.

=== Return to Boston ===
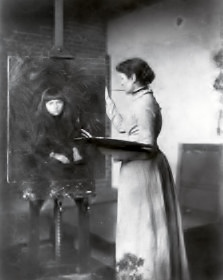
Lilla Cabot Perry in the Studio c. 1890

Perry's artistic career took on new meaning when she returned to Boston. She was not content to simply paint in the new style she had acquired while overseas. More than this, she was inspired to "foster a new truth in painting" in the Boston art community, which was not responsive to the new Impressionist modes. In 1890, Perry helped to organize the first public exhibition of John Breck's landscapes at the St. Botolph Club.

Perry won a silver medal in 1892 exhibition of the Massachusetts Charitable Mechanic Association. In 1893 Perry was chosen to represent Massachusetts at the World's Columbian Exposition in Chicago, Illinois. Perry had seven works displayed at the exhibition, of which four of the compositions were worked in the en plein air style (Petite Angèle, I, An Open Air Concert, Reflections, Child in a Window) and three were more formal studio portraits (Portrait of a Child, Child with a Violoncello, Portrait Study of a Child).

In 1894, Perry had achieved another success when her Impressionist paintings were exhibited in Boston at the St. Botolph Club with other artists, including Edmund C. Tarbell (1862–1938), Philip Leslie Hale (1865–1931), Theodore Wendel (1859–1932), Frederick Porter Vinton (1846–1911), and Dawson Dawson-Watson (1864–1939). Not only did this exhibition reveal that Perry's work was being accepted in America, it also proved that Impressionism was finally starting to be accepted as an art form outside of Europe. Perry also held an exhibit of Monet's work at the Boston Art Students Association that year.

Between 1894 and 1897, Perry's work achieved international acclaim. Not only was she able to exhibit her work in Boston, she also regularly exhibited at the Société Nationale des Beaux-Arts at the Salon de Champ de Mars during this time. The year 1897 brought another exhibition for Perry at the St. Botolph Club. A Boston Evening Transcript critic said of her work, "Mrs. Perry is one of the most genuine, no-nonsense, natural painters that we know of.... Such paintings must be taken seriously." Unlike her previous exhibition at the same location, this exhibit was a solo show featuring the breadth of Perry's artistic achievements up until that point, including Impressionist portraits and landscapes.

=== Japan ===
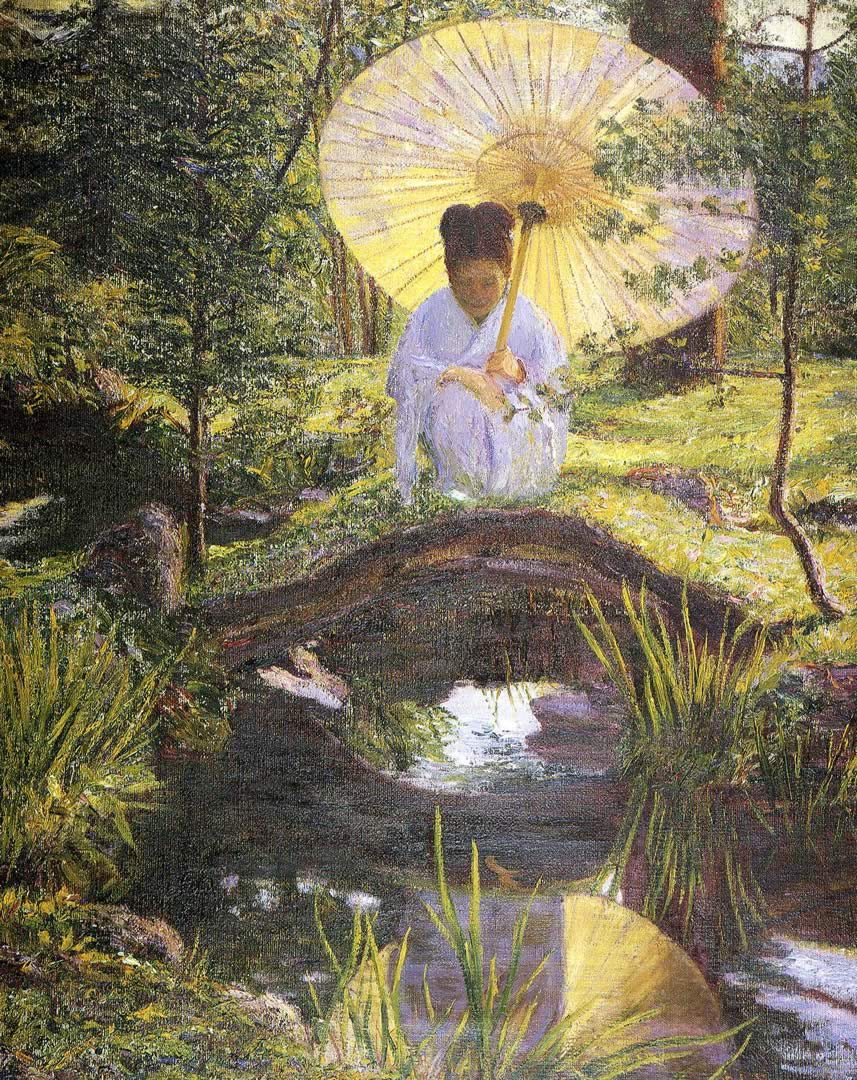
Lilla Cabot Perry, In a Japanese Garden, 1898-1901

A new inspiration entered Perry's life in 1897 when her husband received a teaching position in Japan as an English professor at the Keio Gijuku University. Lilla Perry met Okakura Kakuzō, one of the Imperial Art School co-founders. For three years Perry resided in Japan and took full advantage of its unique artistic community. In October 1898, Perry exhibited her work in Tokyo, with the assistance of Kakuzō, and became an honorary member of the Nippon Bijutsu-In Art Association. Perry's involvement with the Asian art world greatly influenced her work and made it possible for her to develop a unique style that brought together western and eastern aesthetic traditions. Her Meditation, Child in a Kimono, and Young Girl with an Orange vibrantly illustrate the distinct changes that occurred in her work during her stay in Japan. Unlike her earlier works, these compositions draw on uniquely eastern subject matter and show a strong influence of the clean lines from Japanese prints. The result of this blending of east and west is striking, with Impressionist portraits flowing seamlessly with the well-organized, balanced compositions that the eastern art world was known for at the time. Mount Fuji became the subject of 35 or more of her paintings, and she made a total of more than 80 paintings while in Japan.

=== Boston and Paris ===
By 1901, Perry had returned to Boston to the Perrys' home on Marlborough Street, and two years later the Perrys bought a farmhouse in Hancock, New Hampshire, as a summer house. It was during her time in Hancock that Perry conceived Boy Fishing (1929), which featured a local farm boy (known to be Robert Eaton Richardson Sr.), a painting that is now part of the White House Art Collection. In 1904, her Portrait of Mrs. Joseph Clark Grew [Alice Perry] won a bronze medal at the prestigious International Louisiana Purchase Exhibition in St. Louis. The upcoming years would prove to be difficult for Perry's personal life. In 1905, she returned to France, and by the winter of the same year, her health had collapsed. Frequent moves and losses from unprofitable investments, along with having spent most of the inheritance from her father, meant that Perry constantly needed to commission portraits to support the family, which took a toll on her health.

=== Return to America ===
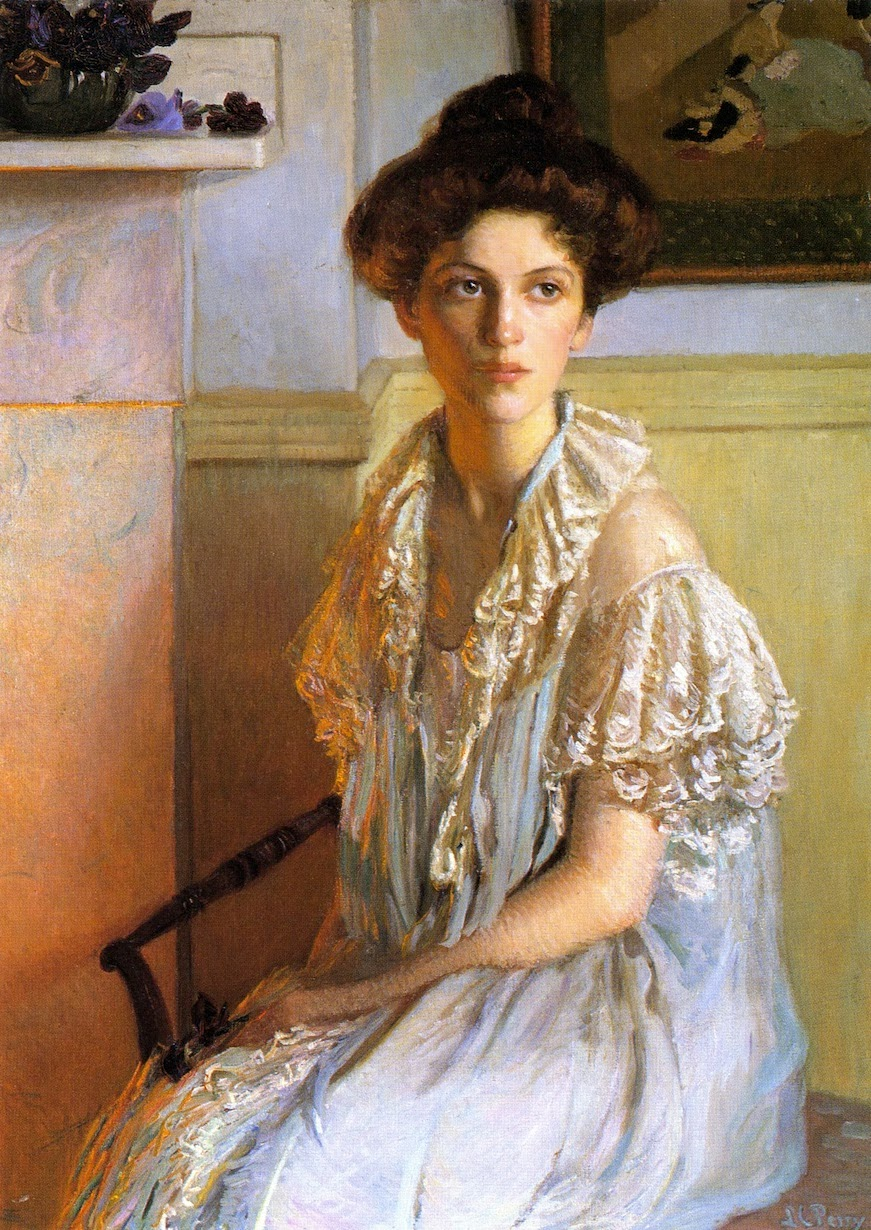
Lady with a Bowl of Violets, 1910

In 1908, Perry returned to Boston, but she focused on portraits because they were more marketable than her landscapes. She regained her health and had six of her paintings exhibited in Paris at the Salon des Indépendants, including Dans un Bateau and Le Paravent Jaune in 1908. In November 1909, Perry returned to America with a newfound inspiration for her work. The following year, she demonstrated her renewed enthusiasm for her art by creating a rare urban view for her oeuvre, The State House, Boston (1910). She was a founding member of The Guild of Boston Artists (1914). By 1915, Perry had received yet another bronze medal at the Panama–Pacific International Exposition in San Francisco, California for her portrait, Hildegarde, the daughter of a friend. In 1916, she painted a portrait of Edwin Arlington Robinson, who wrote a biography of her husband for The Dictionary of American Biography. Robinson often visited the Perrys at their house in Hancock, New Hampshire.

Throughout her career as an artist, Perry was deeply engaged in the artistic communities of whatever town she lived in and actively promoted Impressionism's style. The passage of time did not cause Perry's passions to wane. In 1913, Perry helped to form the ultra-conservative Guild of Boston Artists in order to oppose the art world's avant-garde trends. Perry was dissatisfied by the “modern art" that was taking hold. In 1920, Perry received a commemoration for giving six years of loyal service to the Guild.

In 1922, she had her first solo exhibition in New York, which included her landscapes from Japan and Giverny. A New York Morning Telegrapher review called it "one of the most exciting exhibitions given by a woman in this city in years."

=== Final years ===
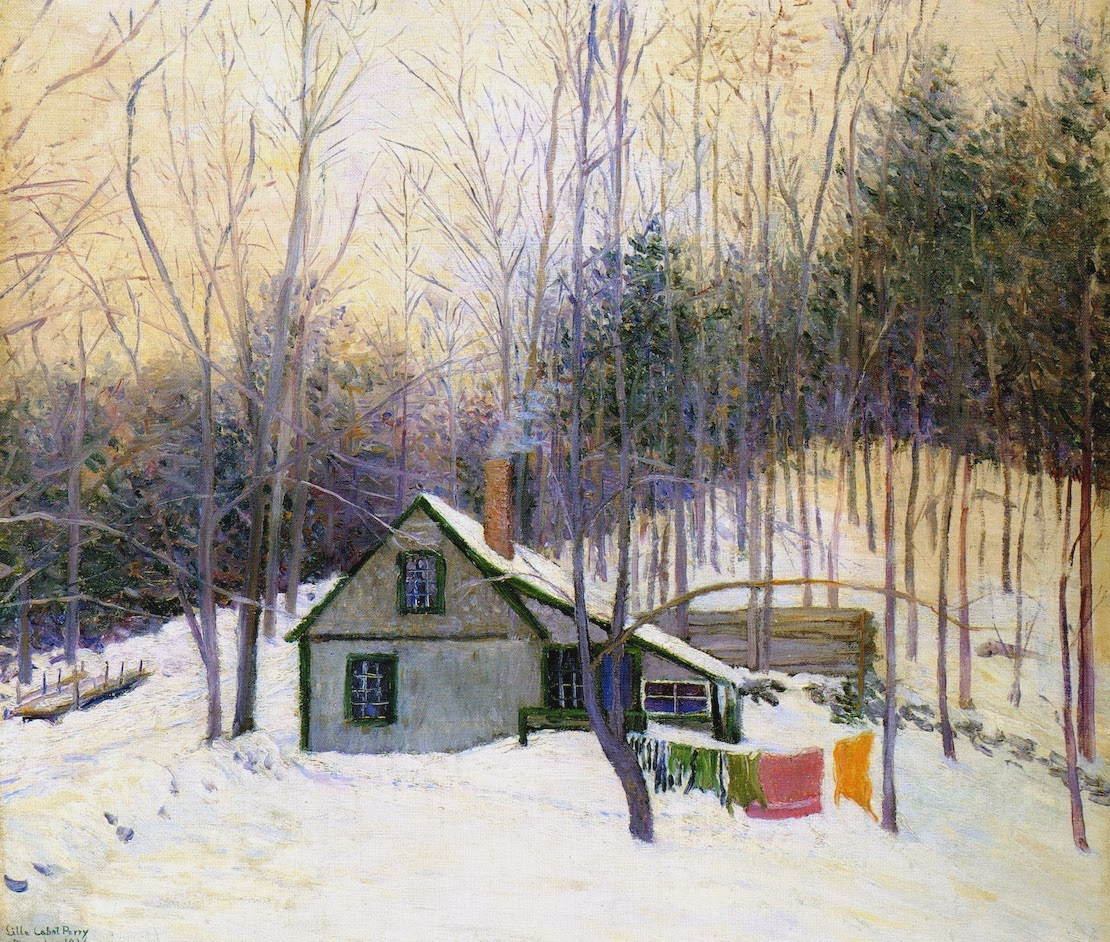
A Snowy Monday, 1926 (The Cooperage, Hancock, New Hampshire)

By 1923, Perry's book of poetry, The Jar of Dreams, was published. It included a poem of her appreciation for Japan and New England:

The sun breaks forth and now my plum tree smiles,
Charming its feathery burden into dew,
That all its flowers may drink a health to Spring!
For February in Japan beguiles
Even my homesick heart from thoughts of you,
New England, still icebound and blustering.

The same year she became critically ill with diphtheria while her daughter Edith had a complete mental health collapse and was sent to a private mental health institution in Wellesley. Perry spent the next two years in convalescence in Charleston, South Carolina. During this time, she found new inspiration for her landscape theme and executed works such as Road from Charleston to Savannah and A Field, Late Afternoon, Charleston, South Carolina. It was also during her time in Charleston that Perry found a new theme for her landscapes, what she referred to as "snowscapes." Two examples of her snowscapes include A Snowy Monday (1926) and After First Snow (1926).

In 1927, there was an exhibition in February at the Gordon Dunthorne Gallery. She published "Reminiscences of Claude Monet from 1889 to 1909" first in 1927 in the Magazine of Art. The following year, on May 7, 1928, Thomas Sergeant Perry died after having been sick with pneumonia. After a period of mourning, Perry again allowed her work to be exhibited at the Guild of Boston Artists – the organization she helped to establish – in 1929 and then again in 1931. Many of her landscapes were showcased in the exhibition, including Autumn Leaves (1926), Lakeside Reflections (1929–1931), and Snow, Ice, Mist (1929).

Perry painted winter scenes, which reflected an abstract influence, at her Hancock, New Hampshire, vacation home. Mist on the Mountain (1931) was her last exhibited landscape. She continued to paint until her death.

Lilla Cabot Perry died on February 28, 1933. Her ashes, and those of her husband, who died in 1928, are buried at the Pine Ridge Cemetery in Hancock, New Hampshire.

== Legacy ==
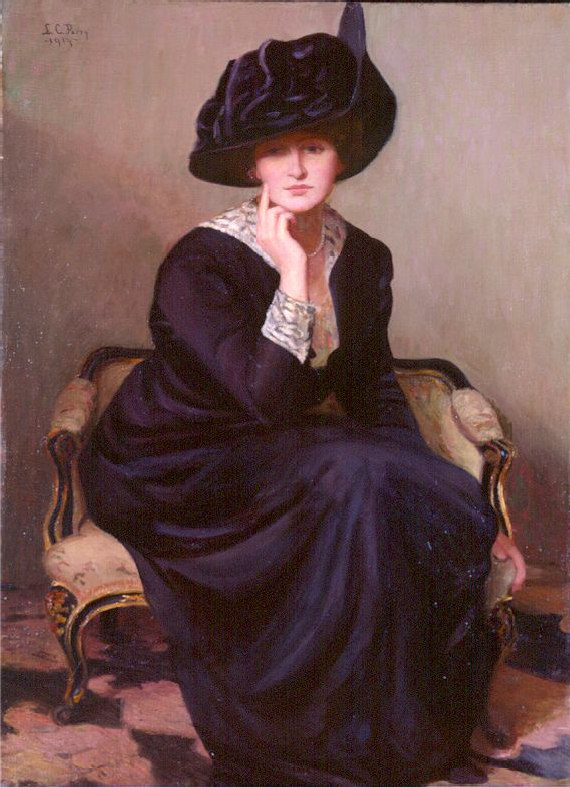
The Black Hat, 1914

Hirschl & Adler Galleries held a retrospective of her work in 1969, and the Boston Athenæum exhibited her works in March 1982. Her blending of eastern and western aesthetics and her sensitive visions of the feminine and natural worlds offered significant stylistic contributions to both the American and French Impressionist schools.

Her vocal advocacy for the Impressionist movement helped to make it possible for other American Impressionists, such as Mary Cassatt, to gain the exposure and acceptance they needed in the states. She furthered the American careers of her close friends Claude Monet and John Breck by lecturing stateside on their talents and showcasing their works. She also worked closely with Camille Pissarro to assist him in his dire financial situation by selling his work to friends and family in America.

== Selected exhibitions ==
1893 – World's Columbian Exposition, Chicago, Illinois
1897 – St. Botolph Club in Boston
1898 – Tokyo Exhibition
1904 – International Louisiana Purchase Exhibition
1908 – Salon des Independants, Paris, France
1915 – Panama Pacific International Exposition, San Francisco, California
1927 – The Gordon Dunthorne Gallery
1929 – The Guild of Boston Artists
1931 – The Guild of Boston Artists
1969 – Lilla Cabot Perry, A Retrospective Exhibition. Currier Gallery of Art, Manchester, New Hampshire
1982 – Lilla Cabot Perry, Paintings. Boston Athenaeum, Boston, Massachusetts
1989 – The Founders Show, Guild of Boston Artists, Boston, Massachusetts
1990 – Lilla Cabot Perry: An American Impressionist, National Museum of Women in the Arts, Washington, D.C.
2018 – Women in Paris 1850-1900, traveling exhibition

== Selected works ==
=== Paintings ===
| Work | Image | Date | Collection |
|---|---|---|---|
| Portrait of an Infant (Margaret Perry) | | 1877–1878 | Private collection |
| The Beginner (Margaret with a violin) | | 1885 | University of Arizona Museum of Art, Tucson, Arizona |
| La Petite Angele, II | | 1889 | Hirschl & Adler Galleries, Inc. |
| Margaret with a Bonnet (Margaret Perry) | | 1890 | Private collection |
| Open Air Concert | | 1890 | Museum of Fine Arts, Boston |
| Self-portrait | | 1889-1896 | Terra Foundation for American Art, Chicago, Illinois |
| A Stream Beneath Poplars | | c. 1890-1900 | Hunter Museum of American Art, Chattanooga, Tennessee |
| Angela | | 1891 | High Museum of Art, Atlanta, Georgia |
| Self Portrait | | 1892 | Hirschl & Adler Galleries, Inc. |
| Portrait of the Baroness von R. | | 1895 | Boston Harbor Hotel, Massachusetts |
| Haystacks, Giverny | | 1896 | Private collection |
| Portrait of Elsa Tudor | | 1898 | National Museum of Women in the Arts, Washington, D.C. |
| Mount Fuji with Gravestones | | 1898–1901 | Fogg Art Museum, Harvard University, Cambridge, Massachusetts. |
| Study of a Statue of Buddha, Japan | | circa 1900 | Private collection |
| The Trio (Alice, Edith, and Margaret Perry) | | 1898–1900 | Fogg Art Museum, Harvard University, Cambridge, Massachusetts |
| A Cup of Tea | | Late 19th early 20th century | Los Angeles County Museum of Art, California |
| En barque sur l'Epte à Giverny | | by 1900 | Musée Alphonse-Georges-Poulain, Vernon, Eure |
| Lady in Black | | 1905 | Smithsonian American Art Museum, Washington, D.C. |
| The White Bed Jacket | | 1905 | Hirschl & Adler Galleries, New York |
| By the Brook, Giverny, France | | 1909 | Terra Foundation for American Art, Chicago, Illinois |
| Lady with a Bowl of Violets | | 1910 | National Museum of Women in the Arts |
| Lady in an Evening Dress (Renee) | | 1911 | National Museum of Women in the Arts, Washington, D.C. |
| Portrait of William Dean Howells | | 1912 | Colby College, Waterville, Maine |
| The Black Hat | | 1914 | Currier Museum of Art, Manchester, New Hampshire |
| Portrait of Edwin Arlington Robinson | | 1916 | Colby College, Waterville, Maine. |
| A Snowy Monday | | 1926 | The Cooperage, Hancock, New Hampshire, 1926 |
| Boy Fishing | | 1929 | White House, Washington, D.C. |
| Autumn Afternoon, Giverny | | undated | Terra Foundation for American Art, Chicago, Illinois |
| The Cellist | | undated | Private Collection |
| The Pink Rose | | undated | Private Collection |
| Reading | | undated | |
| At the window | | undated | Private Collection |

=== Publications ===
Poetry

- The Heart of the Weed (1887)
- Impressions: A Book of Verse. (1898)
- The Jar of Dreams (1923)

Translation from Greek to English

- From the Garden of Hellas (1891)

== See also ==
- American Impressionism
- Cabot family
