= Thomas Dudley Cabot =

American businessman (1897–1995)

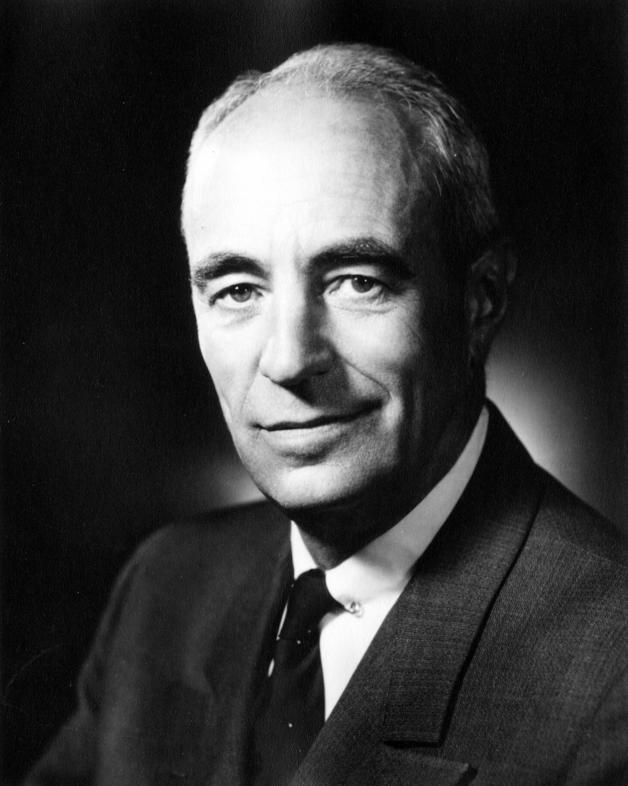
- Born: May 1, 1897; Cambridge, Massachusetts, U.S.
- Died: June 8, 1995 (aged 98); Weston, Massachusetts, U.S.
- Education: Buckingham Browne & Nichols (1913); Harvard University (SB Engineering, 1919)
- Occupation: Businessman
- Parent: Godfrey Lowell Cabot (father)

Thomas Dudley Cabot (May 1, 1897 – June 8, 1995) was an American businessman. He also became the U.S. Department of State's Director of Office of International Security Affairs.

== Early life ==
Cabot was born in Cambridge, Massachusetts. His father was Godfrey Lowell Cabot, founder of Cabot Corporation and a philanthropist. His mother was Maria Moors Cabot. Cabot was named after Thomas Dudley, the governor of Massachusetts Bay Colony who signed the charter creating Harvard College. Two of his siblings were John Moors Cabot (b. 1901), U.S. Ambassador to Sweden, Colombia, Brazil, and Poland during the Eisenhower and Kennedy administration, and Eleanor Cabot of the Eleanor Cabot Bradley Estate.

Cabot graduated from Browne & Nichols School in 1913. He took some courses at Boston Tech (now known as Massachusetts Institute of Technology) and Curtiss Flying School, becoming a World War I flight instructor at Kelly Field in the U.S. Army Signal Corps, before graduating cum laude from Harvard University with a SB in Engineering, in 1919.

== Career ==
Upon graduation, Cabot started working for Cabot Corporation, founded by his father. He was CEO of Cabot Corporation from 1922 to 1960, when he relinquished active control of the company, and went to his Boston office as director emeritus on a regular basis until his death.

Cabot was also a longtime director of United Fruit Company, and became its president in 1948 in hopes of reformation, but resigned in 1949. His brother John Moors Cabot was a major shareholder of United Fruit, as was another family member, Henry Cabot Lodge Jr., who also served as a director of United Fruit.

In 1951, Cabot was U.S. Department of State's Director of Office of International Security Affairs during the Truman administration, where he spoke for the State Department on NATO affairs, was in charge of a U.S. program arming allies throughout the world, and supervised the disbursement of $6 billion in foreign economic and military aid. In 1953, he also served as consultant on a special development mission in Egypt.

In 1960, a Central Intelligence Agency cover called Gibraltar Steamship Company (which didn't own any steamships and whose president was Cabot) owned and established Radio Swan on Swan Island, a covert black operation to win supporters for U.S. policies and discredit Fidel Castro.

Cabot, his brother John Moors Cabot, another family member Henry Cabot Lodge Jr., and Cabot's son, Louis Wellington Cabot, were all Council on Foreign Relations members inducted in 1992.

=== Philanthropic work ===
Cabot also served on the Harvard Board of Overseers, was a Director of the Harvard Alumni Association and significant benefactor of the university, and recipient of a Harvard Medal and honorary Doctor of Laws degree in 1970. In 1985, Harvard's Cabot House was named in honor of Cabot and his wife. The Cabot Science Complex is also named in their honor.

Cabot had many ties to MIT and was the longest serving member of the MIT Corporation, serving for 49 consecutive years. He was elected a Life Member of the Corporation in 1951 and Life Member Emeritus in 1972. As part of his MIT Corporation work he served on many Corporation Standing and Visiting Committees.

He established the Thomas Dudley Cabot Scholarship Fund at MIT in 1960 and in 1977 members of his family honored him by endowing the Thomas Dudley Cabot Institute Chair. He and his wife established the Thomas D. and Virginia W. Cabot chair, in 1986, following his family's legacy of MIT involvement. His grandfather, Dr. Samuel Cabot, was a Boston citizen who supported the founding of MIT and his father, Godfrey L. Cabot, graduated from MIT in 1881. Godfrey L. Cabot also supported the Institute by establishing the Godfrey L. Cabot Solar Energy Fund.

=== Writings ===
- Quick-Water and Smooth: A Canoeist's Guide to New England Rivers, 1935
- Beggar on Horseback: The Autobiography of Thomas D. Cabot, 1979
- Avelinda: The Legacy of a Yankee Yachtsman, 1991

== Personal life ==
Cabot was married to Virginia Wellington Cabot for 75 years, from 1920 to his death in 1995. They resided in Weston, Massachusetts for seventy-five years, and had five children: Louis Wellington Cabot, businessman, philanthropist, former Chairman of Federal Reserve Bank of Boston, Thomas Dudley Cabot Jr., Robert Moors Cabot, Dr. Edmund Billings Cabot, Andover star and retired surgeon, and Linda Cabot Black, cofounder of Opera Company of Boston and Opera New England. in his 80s he lost the sight of an eye in a cross-country skiing accident, but he retained his enthusiasm for the active life. He and his wife, who celebrated their 75th wedding anniversary were tramping the mountains of Colorado. They also had 29 grandchildren, and 23 great-grandchildren. Virginia Cabot died in 1997 at Phillips House in Massachusetts General Hospital in Boston. She was 97.
