= John Moors Cabot =

American diplomat (1901–1981)

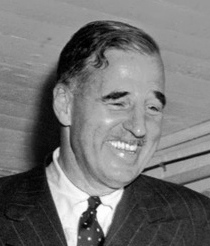

United States Ambassador to Poland
- In office March 2, 1962 – September 24, 1965
- President: John F. Kennedy; Lyndon B. Johnson
- Preceded by: Jacob D. Beam
- Succeeded by: John A. Gronouski

United States Ambassador to Brazil
- In office July 22, 1959 – August 17, 1961
- President: Dwight Eisenhower; John F. Kennedy
- Preceded by: Ellis O. Briggs
- Succeeded by: Lincoln Gordon

United States Ambassador to Colombia
- In office July 12, 1957 – July 15, 1959
- President: Dwight Eisenhower
- Preceded by: Philip Bonsal
- Succeeded by: Dempster McIntosh

United States Ambassador to Sweden
- In office May 6, 1954 – May 14, 1957
- President: Dwight Eisenhower
- Preceded by: William Walton Butterworth
- Succeeded by: Francis White

4th Assistant Secretary of State for Inter-American Affairs
- In office March 3, 1953 – March 1, 1954
- President: Dwight Eisenhower
- Preceded by: Edward G. Miller Jr.
- Succeeded by: Henry F. Holland

United States Ambassador to Finland
- In office February 27, 1950 – September 20, 1952
- President: Harry Truman
- Preceded by: Avra M. Warren
- Succeeded by: Jack K. McFall

Personal details
- Born: December 11, 1901 Cambridge, Massachusetts, U.S.
- Died: February 24, 1981 (aged 79) Washington, D.C.
- Spouse: Elizabeth Lewis (m. 1932) (1906-1992)
- Children: John Godfrey Lowell Cabot; Lewis Cabot
- Parent(s): Godfrey Lowell Cabot; Maria Moors Cabot
- Education: Buckingham Browne & Nichols
- Alma mater: Harvard University (1923); Oxford University
- Occupation: Diplomat, U.S. Ambassador

John Moors Cabot (December 11, 1901 – February 24, 1981) was an American diplomat and U.S. Ambassador to five nations during the Truman, Eisenhower, and Kennedy administrations. He also served as Assistant Secretary of State for Inter-American Affairs. He warned repeatedly of the dangers of Soviet communism toward American interests in Latin America.

== Early life ==
Cabot was born in Cambridge, Massachusetts. His father was Godfrey Lowell Cabot (1861–1962), founder of Cabot Corporation and a philanthropist. His mother was Maria Moors Cabot. Two of his siblings were Thomas Dudley Cabot (b. 1897), businessman and philanthropist and Eleanor Cabot of the Eleanor Cabot Bradley Estate.

Cabot graduated from Buckingham Browne & Nichols in 1919. He would go on to graduate magna cum laude from Harvard University in 1923, and from Oxford University with a degree in Modern History.

== Career ==
Cabot joined the U.S. Foreign Service in 1926. Much of his early career was spent in Latin America. His first Foreign Service assignment was as a consul in Callao-Lima, Peru, in 1927. For the next eight years, he served in the Dominican Republic, Mexico, and Brazil. From 1935 to 1939, he served first in the Netherlands and then in Sweden. From 1939 to 1941, he was in Guatemala.

During much of World War II, Cabot worked in the State Department as assistant chief of the division of American Republics and then as chief of the division of Caribbean and Central American affairs.

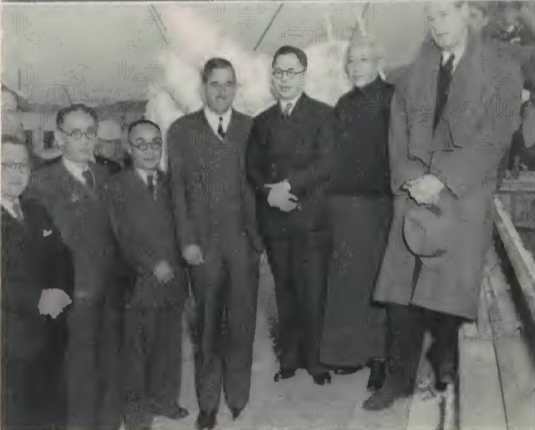
Cabot (centre) in Shanghai in 1948 with Mayor K.C. Wu to his left

He was posted to Argentina after the war and, then, in 1947, he was appointed counsellor of the U.S. Embassy in Belgrade, Yugoslavia. He was then appointed U.S. Consul General in Shanghai between 1948 and 1949 and was in post when the Communist troops took over the city in May, 1949.

Cabot served a U.S. Ambassador to Sweden from 1954 to 1957, Colombia from 1957 to 1959, Brazil from 1959 to 1961, and Poland from 1962 to 1965, during the Eisenhower and Kennedy administration. He was also commissioned to Pakistan during a recess of the Senate, but did not serve under this appointment. From 1953 to 1954, he also served as Assistant Secretary of State for Inter-American Affairs. There is a 27 page transcript from an interview of Cabot, discussing the Alliance for Progress, Bay of Pigs invasion, Cold War, foreign policy, and international relations during the Kennedy administration, archived in the John F. Kennedy Presidential Library and Museum.

As ambassador to Brazil from 1959 to 1961 his public relations campaigns on behalf of American business angered nationalist politicians and journalists. President Jânio Quadros of Brazil publicly rebuked Cabot for questioning Brazil's foreign policy and tolerance of the Cuban revolution. President John Kennedy recalled Cabot early in 1961.

In December 1954, Cabot, in his role as U.S. ambassador to Sweden, attended the Nobel banquet and read the acceptance speech for the Nobel Prize in Literature awarded that year to Ernest Hemingway who was not present due to ill health.

Following his retirement from the U.S. Department of State, he taught at Georgetown University's Edmund A. Walsh School of Foreign Service and Tufts Fletcher School of Law and Diplomacy. In 1981, Tuft's John M. and Elizabeth L. Cabot Intercultural Center was named in honor of Cabot and his wife.

== Personal life ==
In 1932, he married Vassar College graduate Elizabeth Lewis (d. 1992). Together, they were the parents of four children:

- John G.L. Cabot (1934-2026)
- Lewis P. Cabot (1937-2019), owner of the Portland, Maine-based Southworth Machine Company and prominent collector of modern art
- Marjorie Cabot, who married Antonio Enríquez Savignac (1931–2007) in 1957.
- Elizabeth T. Cabot, who married Bogislav von Wentzel.

Cabot died at Georgetown University Hospital in Washington, D.C., on February 24, 1981.

== Published works ==
- The Racial Conflict in Transylvania: A Discussion of the Conflicting Claims of Rumania and Hungary to Transylvania, the Banat, and the Eastern Section of the Hungarian Plain, 1926
- Toward Our Common American Destiny: Speeches and Interviews on Latin American Problems, 1954
- First line of defense: forty years' experiences of a career diplomat (Georgetown University, School of Foreign Service, 1979).

Government offices
Preceded by Edward G. Miller Jr.	Assistant Secretary of State for Inter-American Affairs; March 3, 1953 – March 1, 1954	Succeeded by Henry F. Holland
Diplomatic posts
Preceded by Avra M. Warren	United States Ambassador to Finland; February 27, 1950 – September 20, 1952	Succeeded by Jack K. McFall
Preceded by W. Walton Butterworth	United States Ambassador to Sweden; May 6, 1954 – May 14, 1957	Succeeded by Francis White
Preceded by Philip Bonsal	United States Ambassador to Colombia; July 12, 1957 – July 15, 1959	Succeeded by Dempster McIntosh
Preceded by Ellis O. Briggs	United States Ambassador to Brazil; July 22, 1959 – August 17, 1961	Succeeded by Lincoln Gordon
Preceded by Jacob D. Beam	United States Ambassador to Poland; March 2, 1962 – September 24, 1965	Succeeded by John A. Gronouski
