= Ellis O. Briggs =

American diplomat (1899–1976)

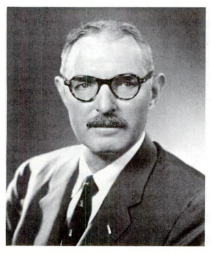

US Ambassador to the Dominican Republic
- In office April 17, 1943 – April 22, 1944
- Preceded by: Avra M. Warren
- Succeeded by: Joseph F. McGurk

US Ambassador to Uruguay
- In office August 21, 1947 – August 6, 1949
- Preceded by: Joseph F. McGurk
- Succeeded by: Christian M. Ravndal

US Ambassador to Czechoslovakia
- In office October 8, 1952 – October 30, 1953
- Preceded by: Joseph E. Jacobs
- Succeeded by: George Wadsworth

US Ambassador to South Korea
- In office August 25, 1952 – April 12, 1955
- Preceded by: John J. Muccio
- Succeeded by: William S. B. Lacy

US Ambassador to Peru
- In office March 24, 1952 – June 5, 1956
- Preceded by: Harold H. Tittmann Jr.
- Succeeded by: Theodore C. Achilles

US Ambassador to Brazil
- In office July 24, 1956 – April 29, 1959
- Preceded by: James Clement Dunn
- Succeeded by: John M. Cabot

US Ambassador to Greece
- In office April 8, 1959 – February 1, 1962
- Preceded by: James Williams Riddleberger
- Succeeded by: Henry Richardson Labouisse, Jr.

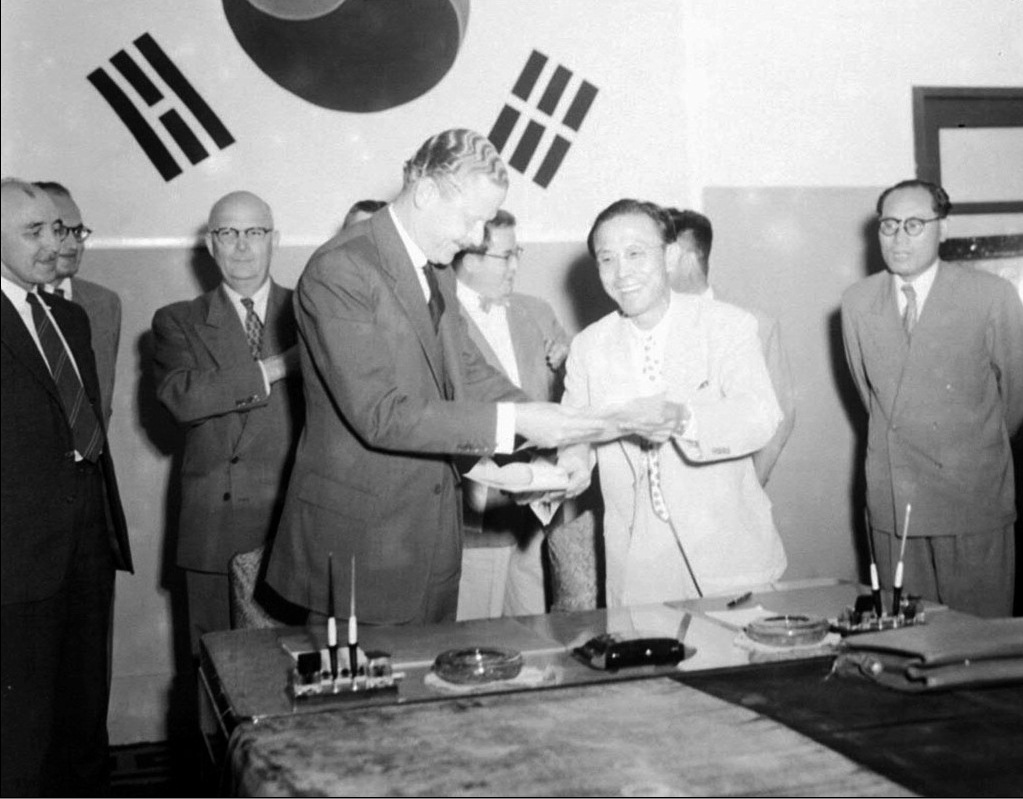
Briggs (left) in 1955

Ellis Ormsbee Briggs (December 1, 1899 – February 21, 1976) was an American diplomat who served as Ambassador to seven countries over the course of his career.

== Early life and family ==
Briggs was born in Massachusetts to James Briggs and Lucy Hill Briggs, and was educated at Dartmouth College, graduating in 1921. He married Lucy Barnard in 1928. They had two children; Lucy in 1930, and Everett (who also went on to a career as an American diplomat) in 1934.

== Diplomatic career ==
Position (All with the U.S. State Department)	Date appointed	Period of service	Comments	Reference
Vice Consul to the U.S. Embassy in Lima, Peru		1926–1928		
Third Secretary to the U.S. Embassy in Lima, Peru		1928–1933		
Third Secretary to the U.S. Embassy in Havana, Cuba		1933–1937		
Assistant Chief, Division of American Republics		1937–1940		
Special Mission to the East Coast of South America		1940		
Consul-First Secretary, U.S. Embassy in Santiago, Chile		1940–1941		
First Secretary to the U.S. Embassy in Havana, Cuba		1941–1944		
Chief, Division of Caribbean and Central American Affairs		1944		
United States Ambassador to the Dominican Republic	March 21, 1944	June 3, 1944 – January 14, 1945		
Economic Counselor, Chungking		1945		
Director, Office of American Republic Affairs		1945–1947		
United States Ambassador to Uruguay	July 3, 1947	August 21, 1947–August 6, 1949		
United States Ambassador to Czechoslovakia	September 1, 1949	November 8, 1949–August 27, 1952		
United States Ambassador to South Korea	August 25, 1952	November 25, 1952–April 12, 1955	Commissioned during a recess of the Senate; recommissioned on July 28, 1953, after confirmation.	
United States Ambassador to Peru	March 24, 1955	March 27, 1955 – June 5, 1956		
United States Ambassador to Brazil	May 29, 1956	July 24, 1956–May 2, 1959		
United States Ambassador to Greece	April 8, 1959	July 15, 1959–February 1, 1962		
Career Ambassador	June 24, 1960	N/A		
United States Ambassador to Spain	N/A	N/A	Not commissioned; nomination withdrawn before the Senate acted upon it.	

== Retirement and publications ==
President John F. Kennedy nominated Briggs for the post of U.S. Ambassador to Spain. However, due to illness, Briggs was not able to accept the post, and retired from the State Department in 1962.

Briggs was the author of several memoirs and other works, including:

- Shots Heard Round the World: An Ambassador's Hunting Adventures on Four Continents, a memoir written in 1957, while still with the State Department
- Farewell to Foggy Bottom: The Recollections of a Career Diplomat, another memoir, this one written in 1964, after his retirement
- Anatomy of Diplomacy: The Origin and Execution of American Foreign Policy, a 1968 book on international affairs
- Proud Servant: Memoirs of a Career Ambassador, another memoir, this one published posthumously in 1998

He died in 1976 in Gainesville, Georgia.
