= Samuel Cabot Inc. =

American wood stain manufacturing company

- Type: Privately held company
- Industry: Paint
- Founded: 1877; 149 years ago
- Founder: Samuel Cabot IV
- Defunct: 2005
- Fate: Acquired
- Successor: Valspar
- Headquarters: Newburyport, Massachusetts, United States
- Area served: Worldwide
- Products: Cabot Stain wood stain and wood finishes
- Owner: Valspar
- Website: www.cabotstain.com

Samuel Cabot Inc. is an American manufacturing company of wood stain and other wood finishes. The company's best-known brand is Cabot Stain.

The company was founded by Samuel Cabot IV of the Cabot family in 1877 and remained privately held until it was acquired by the Valspar Corporation in 2005.

It is headquartered are in Newburyport, Massachusetts.

== History ==
Samuel Cabot IV studied chemistry at M.I.T. and Zurich Polytechnic (now ETH Zurich). After visiting factories in Europe, he was inspired to work on coal tar-based products. He set up a laboratory in Chelsea, Massachusetts and his brother Godfrey joined him in 1882. They produced household disinfectant, sheep dip, wood preservatives, and shingle stain using coal tar that was a by-product of the gas works in Boston. They later bought a factory in Worthington, Pennsylvania which produced lampblack for making ink from natural gas.

The Pennsylvania factory later shut down because of insufficient gas, and Godfrey proposed to move the plant to nearby Kittanning. Samuel declined to invest in this venture and Godfrey bought out Samuel's interest in the Pennsylvania operations. Samuel's part of the company continued as Samuel Cabot Incorporated, and Godfrey's became Cabot Corporation.

In 2005, the company was acquired by Valspar which continued to use the Cabot brand for its wood stain products.
