= Avra M. Warren =

American diplomat (1893–1957)

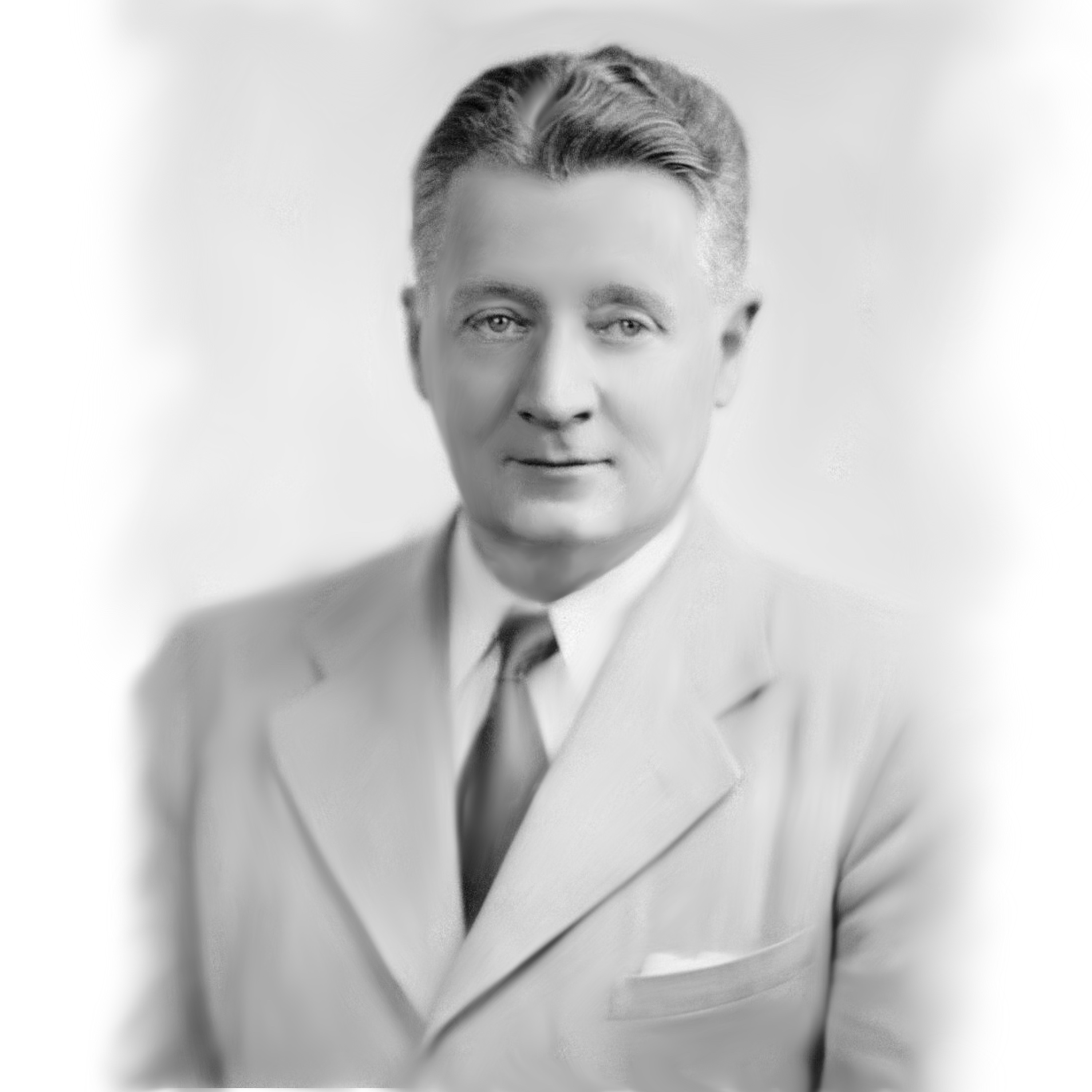
Avra Milvin Warren

Avra Milvin Warren (August 26, 1893 – January 23, 1957) served as the United States ambassador to four countries and minister to three (although he served as minister and later ambassador to the Dominican Republic, so six countries total).

Avra Milvin Warren was a career U.S. diplomat who served in several key ambassadorships during a pivotal era in American foreign policy. Known for his postings in Latin America, the Middle East, and Europe, Warren played a significant role in advancing U.S. interests during World War II and the early Cold War. He was the U.S. ambassador to the Dominican Republic, Panama, Turkey, and Iceland, where he worked on issues ranging from regional stability to the implementation of the Truman Doctrine. However, his legacy is mixed, as his tenure as chief of the Visa Division coincided with restrictive immigration policies that hindered Jewish refugees fleeing the Holocaust.

== Early life and education ==
Warren was born on February 24, 1893, in Ilchester, Howard County, Maryland. Details about his early life and education remain scarce, but it is known that he joined the U.S. Foreign Service early in his career, demonstrating a commitment to public service and diplomacy. His path to becoming a key figure in U.S. foreign relations was shaped by the evolving international challenges of the mid-20th century. Warren led a private life outside of his diplomatic career. Warren married Mary Nicols Newnam in 1923. Together, they had two children.

== Diplomatic career ==
=== Early career ===
Warren began his diplomatic service with postings in Latin America, where he gained experience in U.S.-Latin American relations. These assignments laid the groundwork for his later ambassadorships in the region, where he would address issues of strategic importance to the United States.

==== Chief of the Visa Division (1937–1940) ====
In 1937, Warren was appointed chief of the Visa Division in the U.S. State Department. During his tenure, the division oversaw the issuance of visas under restrictive U.S. immigration laws. This period was marked by growing global instability and the persecution of Jewish populations in Europe. The State Department, including the Visa Division, faced widespread criticism for its stringent immigration policies, which effectively limited the number of Jewish refugees who could enter the United States. Bureaucratic hurdles, stringent documentation requirements, and fears of espionage were key factors in these restrictions.

While Warren’s role was largely administrative, historians note that his leadership coincided with a broader systemic failure to provide refuge to those fleeing Nazi persecution. Unlike some diplomats who actively sought to assist refugees, there is no record of Warren taking extraordinary measures to circumvent these policies.

==== Ambassador to the Dominican Republic (1942–1944) ====
During World War II, Warren served as the U.S. ambassador to the Dominican Republic. In this role, he worked to maintain the country’s alignment with the Allied powers and supported regional efforts to prevent Axis influence in the Caribbean. His tenure was focused on fostering stability and ensuring the strategic security of the region.

==== Ambassador to Panama (1944–1947) ====
Warren’s ambassadorship in Panama came during a period of heightened strategic importance for the Panama Canal. He played a key role in maintaining strong bilateral relations and ensuring the canal’s security during the final years of World War II and the early postwar period.

==== Ambassador to Turkey (1947–1950) ====
One of Warren’s most notable postings was as ambassador to Turkey, where he served during the early years of the Cold War. His tenure coincided with the implementation of the Truman Doctrine, a U.S. foreign policy initiative aimed at containing Soviet influence in key regions. Warren’s work involved strengthening U.S.-Turkey relations and facilitating American military and economic aid to Turkey. This period laid the groundwork for Turkey’s eventual membership in NATO.

==== Ambassador to Iceland (1953–1954) ====
In the later years of his career, Warren served as ambassador to Iceland, a key NATO ally in the North Atlantic. His efforts focused on reinforcing Iceland’s strategic partnership with the United States and its role within NATO’s Cold War defense strategy.

== Criticism and controversy ==
Warren’s legacy is not without controversy. As chief of the Visa Division, he oversaw immigration policies that have been criticized for their rigidity and lack of compassion toward Jewish refugees fleeing Nazi persecution. While he operated within the constraints of U.S. laws and policies at the time, his tenure is often cited as an example of the State Department’s broader failures to respond adequately to the Holocaust. Unlike some diplomats who actively worked to assist refugees, Warren’s actions reflected the priorities of a system that placed national security concerns above humanitarian considerations.

== Legacy ==
Avra Warren’s career reflects the complexities of U.S. foreign policy in the mid-20th century. He was a skilled diplomat who contributed to the advancement of U.S. interests during World War II and the Cold War. However, his role in overseeing restrictive immigration policies has left a more somber mark on his legacy. Warren’s life and career serve as a lens through which to examine both the successes and shortcomings of American diplomacy during a transformative period in global history.

=== Notable achievements ===
- Strengthening U.S. Alliances: Warren played a key role in maintaining and strengthening U.S. alliances in Latin America, Europe, and the Middle East during critical geopolitical periods.

- Truman Doctrine Implementation: As ambassador to Turkey, Warren was instrumental in supporting the U.S. strategy to counter Soviet influence.

- NATO Relations: In Iceland, Warren’s work helped to solidify NATO’s strategic foothold in the North Atlantic.

Warren died on June 10, 1957, in Dallas, Texas.

== See also ==
UNITED STATES IMMIGRATION AND REFUGEE LAW, 1921–1980

Truman Doctrine

NATO and the Cold War

== Sources ==
- political graveyard entry on Warren

Diplomatic posts
Preceded by himself	United States ambassador to the Dominican Republic; 1943–1944	Succeeded by Ellis O. Briggs
Preceded by H. Merle Cochran	United States ambassador to Pakistan; 1950–1952	Succeeded by John M. Cabot
Preceded by George C. McGhee	United States ambassador to Turkey; 1953–1956	Succeeded by Fletcher Warren
