= Thomas Sergeant Perry =

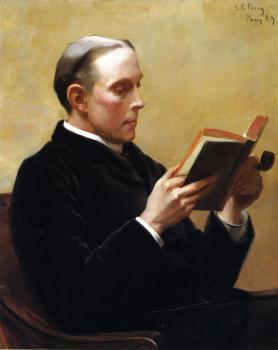
- Portrait by Lilla Cabot Perry, 1889
- Born: January 23, 1845; Newport, Rhode Island
- Died: May 7, 1928 (aged 83); 312 Marlborough Street Boston, Massachusetts
- Spouse: Lilla Cabot (m. 1874)
- Children: 3
- Parent(s): Christopher Grant Perry; Frances Sergeant

Thomas Sergeant Perry (1845–1928) was an American editor, academic, literary critic, literary translator, and literary historian. He was a lifelong friend and associate of Henry James and a member of the faculty at Harvard University.

== Early life ==
Thomas Sergeant Perry was born on January 23, 1845, in Newport, Rhode Island. His parents were Christopher Grant Perry and Frances Sergeant Perry. His paternal grandparents were Commodore Oliver Hazard Perry, brother of Commodore Matthew C. Perry, and Elizabeth Champlin Mason Perry. His maternal grandparents were Thomas Sergeant, a judge of the supreme court of Pennsylvania, and Sarah Bache Sergeant. His father's family line goes back to Edward Perry and Mary Freeman Perry who lived in Plymouth, Massachusetts, in 1635. On his mother's side, one of his ancestors is Benjamin Franklin; Perry was his great-great-grandson.

He was a childhood friend of Henry James, with whom he attended Reverend W.C. Leverett's school in Newport, Rhode Island, before the Civil War. Perry met John La Farge, who later married his sister Margaret, through James.

Perry earned his Bachelor's degree from Harvard University in 1866 and his Masters in 1869. He studied in Paris and Berlin between 1866 and 1868.

== Career ==
Between 1868 and 1872, he was a tutor in German at Harvard. He was an English instructor in English for 1877 to 1881 and an English literature lecturer from 1881 to 82. In 1898, he became professor of English literature in the Keio University, in Tokyo, Japan.

He was a prolific essayist, writing on a wide variety of authors, including Alfred de Musset, Arthur Hugh Clough, Berthold Auerbach, Fritz Reuter, George Sand, Ivan Turgenev, Mark Twain, Edward Fitzgerald, Sir Walter Scott, Victor Cherbuliez, Victor Hugo, William Blake, and William Dean Howells, for a variety of American literary publications, including North American Review and The Century.

Edwin Arlington Robinson dedicated his book of poetry, The Three Taverns, to Lilla and Thomas Perry.

== Personal life ==
On April 9, 1874, he married Lilla Cabot, an American painter who was an important figure in Impressionism in the United States. The couple had three daughters:

- Margaret Perry (b. 1876)
- Edith Perry (b. 1880)
- Alice Perry (b. 1884), who married Joseph Clark Grew (1880–1965), the Under Secretary of State, and later, the U.S. Ambassador to Japan during the December 7, 1941, attack on Pearl Harbor

Thomas Sergeant Perry died on May 7, 1928, after being ill with pneumonia.

== Works ==
His published works include:

Editor

- North American Review, 1872-74
- Life and Letters of Francis Lieber, 1882
- English Literature in the Eighteenth Century, 1873

Author

- Thomas Sergeant Perry (October 1876). "George Sand". The Atlantic Monthly. 38: 444–451.
- Francis Lieber; Thomas Sergeant Perry (1882). The Life and Letters of Francis Lieber. The Lawbook Exchange, Ltd. ISBN 978-1-58477-682-6.
- Thomas Sergeant Perry (1883). English Literature in the Eighteenth Century, by Thomas Sergeant Perry. Harper.
- Thomas Sergeant Perry (1884). From Opitz to Lessing: a study of pseudo-classicism in literature. J.R. Osgood and company.
- Thomas Sergeant Perry (1885). Franz Lieber aus den Denkwürdigkeiten eines Deutsch-Amerikaners (1800-1872). W. Spemann.
- Thomas Sergeant Perry (1 January 1999) [1888]. The Evolution of a Snob. Reprint Services Corporation. ISBN 978-0-7812-8742-5.
- Thomas Sergeant Perry (1890) [1888]. A History of Greek Literature. H. Holt.
- William Dean Howells, Ed.; Thomas Sergeant Perry, Ed. (1888). Library of Universal Adventure by Land and Sea. New York, Harper and Brothers.
- Thomas Sergeant Perry (1906). John Fiske. Small, Maynard.
- Selections from the Letters of Thomas Sergeant Perry (1929, Macmillan Company) Edited by Edwin Arlington Robinson - Included are letters to Mrs. John La Farge; Mrs. Christopher Grant Perry; Moorfield Storey; William James; Rev. H. W. Fay; John T. Morse, Jr.; Salomon Reinach; Joseph C. Grew.

Translator

He also made translations from French and German.

- Ivan Turgenev (1877). Virgin Soil ... Translated with the Author's Sanction from the French Version. Leisure hour series. New York: Henry Holt and Company.
- Arthur Léon Baron Imbert de Saint-Amand (1890). Citizeness Bonaparte. London: Hutchinson & Co.
- Arthur Léon Baron Imbert de Saint-Amand (1890). The Wife of the First Consul. Femme du premier consul.English. New York: Charles Scribner's Sons.
- Arthur Léon Baron Imbert de Saint-Amand (1890). The Happy Days of the Empress Marie Louise. His Famous women of the French court. New York: Charles Scribner's Sons.
- Arthur Léon Baron Imbert de Saint-Amand (1890). Marie Louise and the Decadence of Empire. His Famous women of the French court. New York: Charles Scribner's Sons.
- Arthur Léon Baron Imbert de Saint-Amand (1890). The Court of the Empress Josephine. Famous women of the French court. New York: Charles Scribner's Sons.
- Arthur Léon Baron Imbert de Saint-Amand (1890). Marie Antoinette and the End of the Old Regime. His Famous women of the French court. New York: Charles Scribner's Sons.
- Arthur Léon Baron Imbert de Saint-Amand (1891). Marie Louise and the Invasion of 1814. Famous women of the French court. New York: Charles Scribner's Sons.
- Marie Madeleine Motier (Countess de La Fayette.) (1892). The Princess of Clèves ... Translated by Thomas Sergeant Perry. With Illustrations Drawn by Jules Garnier, and Engraved by A. Lamotte. [With a Preface by Pierre Laffitte]. London, Cambridge, Mass.
