= Arthur Tracy Cabot =

American surgeon (1852–1915)

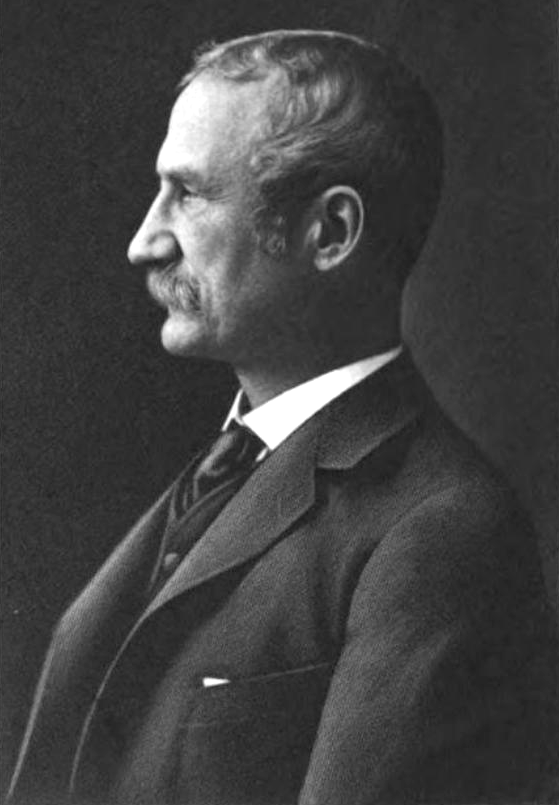
- Born: Arthur Tracy Cabot; January 5, 1852; Boston, Massachusetts, U.S.
- Died: November 4, 1912 (aged 60); Boston, Massachusetts, U.S.
- Education: Harvard College; Harvard Medical School
- Occupation: Surgeon Chairman of the trustees of the Massachusetts State Hospitals for Consumptives
- Spouse: Susan Shattuck (m. 1882)

Arthur Tracy Cabot (January 5, 1852 – November 4, 1912) was an American surgeon who was the first chairman of the board of trustees of the Massachusetts State Hospitals for Consumptives and the first curator of the Harvard Dental Museum.

== Early life ==
Cabot was born on January 5, 1852, in Boston. His father, Samuel Cabot III, was a noted physician. His grandfathers, Samuel Cabot Jr. and Patrick Tracy Jackson, and great-grandfather Thomas Handasyd Perkins, were wealthy businessmen. Cabot's siblings included Lilla Cabot Perry and Godfrey Lowell Cabot.

Cabot attended Boston Latin School and graduated from Harvard College in 1872 and Harvard Medical School in 1876. After finishing medical school, he spent fourteen months traveling and studying in Europe. He received instruction in the laboratory of Rudolf Virchow and heard Joseph Lister's first address at King's College.

== Career ==
In 1878, Cabot began practicing medicine in Boston. He practiced at his father's former home at 11 Park Square before moving to 1 Marlborough Street.

Cabot was a surgeon at Carney Hospital and Boston Children's Hospital (1879–1889). He had a lengthy career at Massachusetts General Hospital. He was a surgeon to outpatients from 1881 to 1886, a visiting surgeon from 1886 to 1907, and a consulting surgeon from 1907 to 1912.

From 1878 to 1880, Cabot was an instructor in oral pathology and surgery at Harvard Medical School. From 1885 to 1886, he was a clinical instructor in genitourinary surgery. He then served as a Fellow of Harvard College from 1896 until his death.

Cabot began working on tuberculosis prevention in 1904. He was the chairman of the Massachusetts Medical Society's committees for the prevention and control of tuberculosis. In 1906, Governor Curtis Guild Jr. appointed him to the newly-formed board of trustees for the Massachusetts State Hospitals for Consumptives. At the board's first meeting, Cabot was elected chairman. Under his leadership, the state opened sanatoriums in North Reading, Lakeville, and Westfield, and the Rutland Heights State Hospital was put under the management of the trustees. He played an influential role in securing the passage of a bill that required instruction in hygiene and preventive disease in public schools. He also served as a consultant to the General Electric Company, guiding how the company could prevent the spread of disease in its River Works and Pittsfield plants. In 1910, he gave up all other work to focus on his duties with the state tuberculosis hospitals.

During his career, Cabot published over 150 articles. His final one, which was on prevention and treatment of childhood tuberculosis, was published in The Atlantic Monthly in November 1912.

Cabot was a fellow of the American Academy of Arts and Sciences and American Surgical Association and honorary president of the American School Hygiene Association. From 1904 to 1906, he was president of the Massachusetts Medical Society.

== Museums ==
Cabot was the first curator of the Harvard Dental Museum, serving from 1879 to 1881. He donated approximately 175 specimens that would form the museum's pathological collection. He was also a supervising director of Harvard's Fogg Museum. In 1898, the Harvard Corporation appointed Cabot to the Museum of Fine Arts, Boston board of directors, a position he held until his death.

== Personal life ==
On August 16, 1882, Cabot married Susan Shattuck, daughter of prominent Boston lawyer George O. Shattuck. They resided in Boston and had no children. In 1902, Cabot hired architect Charles A. Platt to design a country house and garden in Canton, Massachusetts.

Cabot was a member of the Union Club of Boston, Tavern Club, St. Botolph Club, University Club of New York, and The Country Club. He was a Republican, but supported Grover Cleveland for President of the United States. He attended the Unitarian Church.

Cabot died on November 4, 1912, in Boston after an illness of several months. He left $100,000 to Harvard College to be used to purchase books for the Fine Arts department and for the benefit of the medical school. He also left $20,000 for laboratories at Massachusetts General Hospital. His Canton estate was inherited by his niece, Eleanor Cabot Bradley.
