= Godfrey Lowell Cabot =

American industrialist (1861–1962)

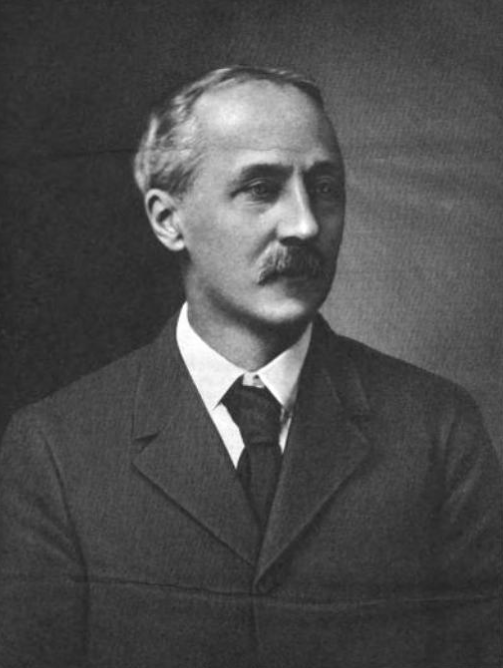
- Born: February 26, 1861; Boston, Massachusetts, U.S.
- Died: November 2, 1962 (aged 101); Boston, Massachusetts, U.S.
- Education: Harvard University (SB Chemistry, 1882)
- Occupation: Businessman
- Children: James Jackson Cabot; Thomas Dudley Cabot; John Moors Cabot; Eleanor Cabot

Signature
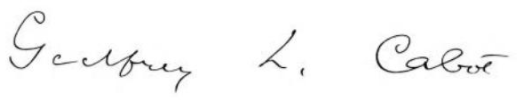

Godfrey Lowell Cabot (February 26, 1861 – November 2, 1962) was an American industrialist who founded the Cabot Corporation.

== Early life ==
Godfrey Lowell Cabot was born in Boston, Massachusetts and attended Boston Latin School. His father was Samuel Cabot III, an eminent surgeon, and his mother was Hannah Lowell Jackson Cabot. He had seven siblings: three being, Lilla Cabot (b. 1848), among the first American impressionist artists, Samuel Cabot IV (b. 1850), chemist and founder of Cabot Stains, and Arthur Tracy Cabot (born 1852), a progressive surgeon.

Cabot attended Massachusetts Institute of Technology for a year, before graduating from Harvard College with a SB in chemistry, in 1882. He was a famous aviation pioneer and World War I U.S. Navy pilot. He also founded the Aero Club of New England.

== Career ==
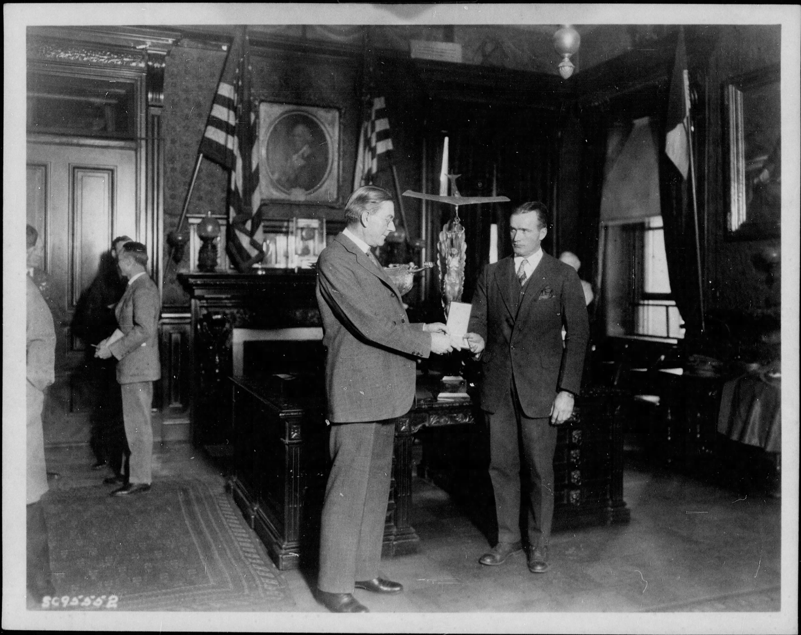
Godfrey Cabot (left) presenting a trophy to Secretary of the Navy

Cabot founded Godfrey L. Cabot, Inc. and its successor, Cabot Corporation, in 1882. It became an industrial empire which included carbon black plants and tens of thousands of acres of land rich in gas, oil, and other minerals; 1,000 miles (1,600 km) of pipeline; seven corporations with worldwide operations; three facilities for converting natural gas into gasoline; and a number of research laboratories.

By 1890, Cabot Corporation, had become America's fourth-largest producer of carbon black, which was used in products, such as inks, shoe polishes, and paints. But with the subsequent advent and popularity of cars, carbon black became in much greater demand as six pounds of it was required in the production of a single tire, and Cabot's incomes soared.

=== Philanthropic work ===
Cabot was also a significant benefactor of MIT, primarily in solar research, resulting in important discoveries in photochemistry, thermal electricity, and in the construction of experimental solar houses. He also established the Godfrey L. Cabot Award for the advancement of aviation, Harvard's Maria Moors Cabot Foundation for Botanical Research, the annual Maria Moors Cabot prize awarded by the Columbia University Graduate School of Journalism, as well as an endowed professorship at the institution. In 1973, Harvard's Godfrey Lowell Cabot Science Library was named in his honor.

Cabot was associated with Calvin Coolidge from Coolidge's Boston days. There is also an audio recording of a discussion between Cabot and Dwight D. Eisenhower on the influence of public opinion on government policy, communism, the Soviet Union, aviation, and V-2 rockets in 1950, kept by the Miller Center of Public Affairs.

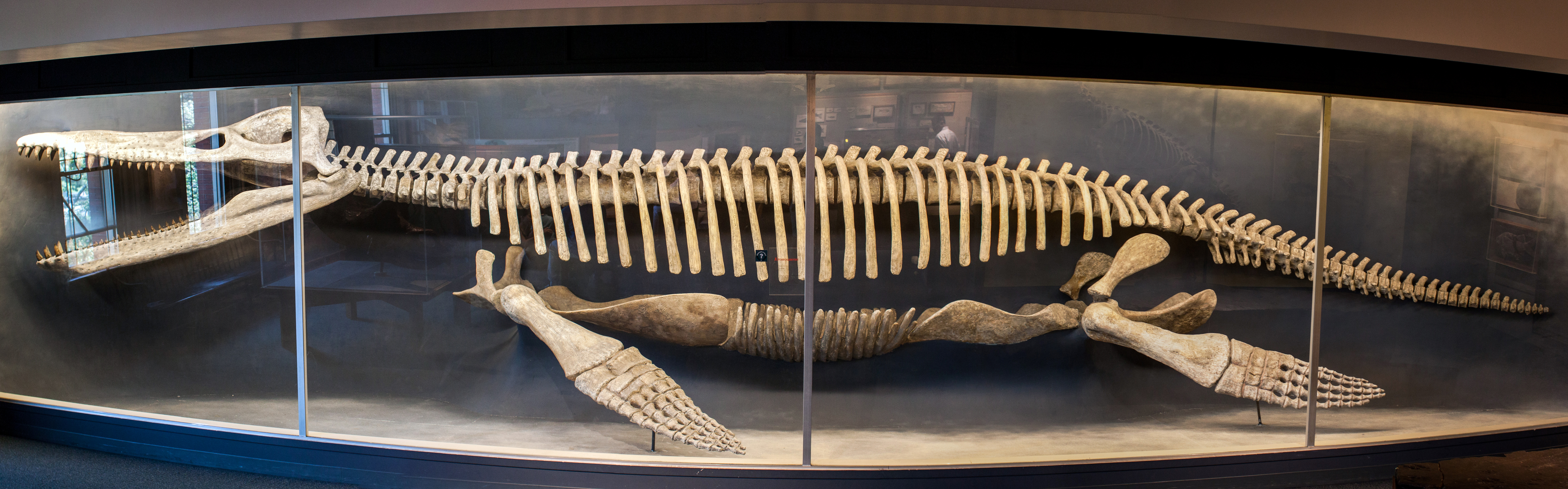
K. queenslandicus at Harvard University which may have been reconstructed with too many vertebrae

While in his nineties, Cabot sponsored the restoration of the Harvard Museum of Comparative Zoology's (MCZ) complete Kronosaurus skeleton. Having been interested in sea serpents since childhood and thus often questioning MCZ director Alfred Romer about the existence and reports of sea serpents, it thus occurred to Dr. Romer to tell Mr. Cabot about the unexcavated Kronosaurus skeleton in the museum closet. Godfrey Cabot thus asked how much a restoration would cost and "Romer, pulling a figure out of the musty air, replied, 'Oh, about $10,000.'" Romer may not have been serious but the philanthropist clearly was because the check for said sum came shortly thereafter. To this day, the application to the Harvard Graduate School of Arts and Sciences asks applicants, "Are you an employee of Godfrey L. Cabot, Inc. or any associated companies?"

== Watch and Ward Society ==
Cabot also devoted his resources to the controversial activist organization known as the New England Society for the Suppression of Vice in Boston. Before Cabot's involvement, the society had made its mark by helping instigate obscenity charges against Walt Whitman's Leaves of Grass. Under Cabot's direction, the organization renamed Watch and Ward Society used economic, social, and legal pressures and even harassment techniques to block the sale and distribution of books which they disapproved of for moral reasons. Among the writers to which they objected were Conrad Aiken, Sherwood Anderson, John Dos Passos, Theodore Dreiser, William Faulkner, Ernest Hemingway, Aldous Huxley, James Joyce, Sinclair Lewis, Bertrand Russell, Upton Sinclair, and H. G. Wells.

While president, he wiretapped the office of district attorney Joseph C. Pelletier. Cabot justified the recording device by saying he needed incriminating evidence to remove Pelletier from office. The Society had also hired a private detective to keep the district attorney under surveillance for two years. The Massachusetts Supreme Judicial Court found Pelletier guilty of 10 of the 21 charges against him and removed him from office.

== Personal life ==
On June 23, 1890, Cabot married Maria B. Moors. They had five children:

- James Jackson Cabot (b. 1891)
- Thomas Dudley Cabot (1897–1995), a businessman and philanthropist in his own right.
- John Moors Cabot (1901–1981), U.S. Ambassador to Sweden, Colombia, Brazil, and Poland during the Eisenhower and Kennedy administration,
- Eleanor Cabot of the Eleanor Cabot Bradley Estate
- William Putnam Cabot.
