= General Electric Pittsfield Plant =

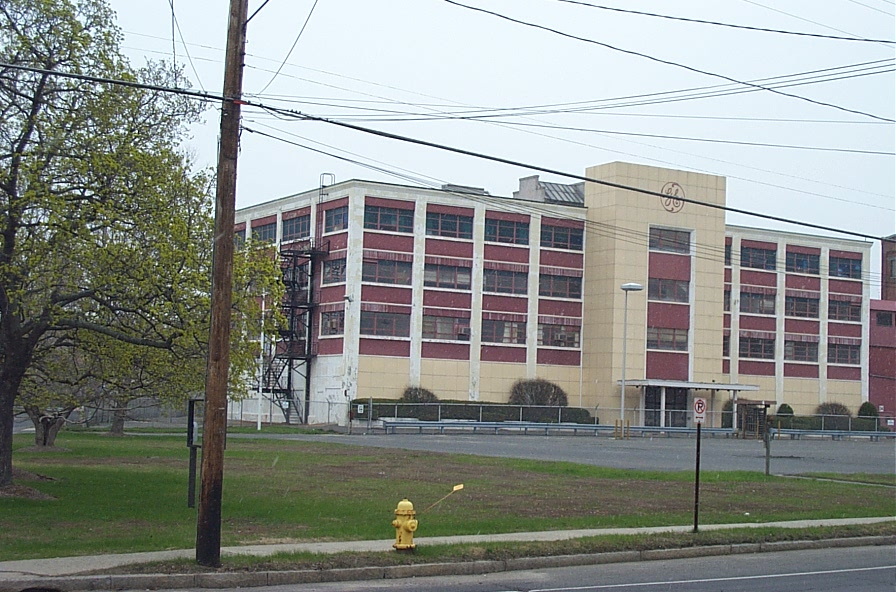
- GE Building 34. Built 1910, demolished 2003.
- Built: 1903
- Location: Pittsfield, Massachusetts
- Industry: Electrical equipment, ordnance, plastics

The General Electric Pittsfield Plant, which included Air Force Plant 69, was a plant of General Electric located in Pittsfield, Massachusetts. GE acquired the facilities of the Stanley Electric Manufacturing Company in 1903.

From circa 1932 until 1977, the Pittsfield Plant discharged PCB pollution to the Housatonic River. The U.S. Environmental Protection Agency (EPA) designated the Pittsfield plant and several miles of the Housatonic as a Superfund site in 1997, and ordered GE to remediate the site. EPA and GE began a cleanup of the area in 1999.

GE demolished some buildings on the 324 acres (1.31 km^{2}) site in the 1990s. Other buildings were demolished between 2001 and 2010. GE transferred some of the cleaned-up properties to the Pittsfield Economic Development Authority (PEDA). GE completed remediation and restoration of the 10 manufacturing plant areas within the city between 1999 and 2018. GE and PEDA are continuing to conduct inspection, monitoring and maintenance activities, pursuant to EPA orders. Cleanup of the polluted downstream river areas has not been completed as of 2025.
