= Radio Swan =

Pirate radio station owned by the CIA

Radio Swan was a pirate radio station owned by the CIA, and based in the Swan Islands, a group of islands in the western Caribbean Sea, near the coastline of Honduras. Under the "Radio Swan" and "Radio Americas" names, the station was in operation from 1960 to 1968.

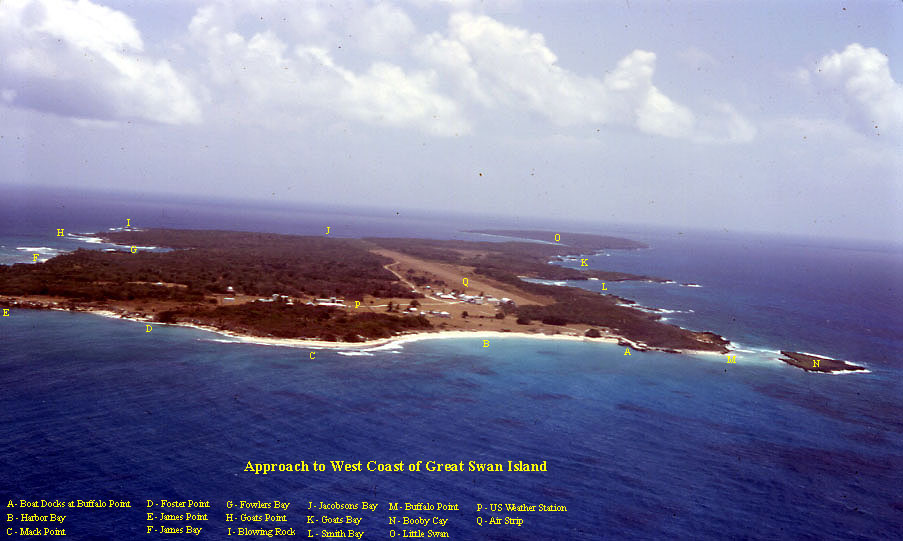
CIA station built by det Alfa of USN Mobile Construction Battalion 6 with runway and dock

== History ==
In 1960, a Central Intelligence Agency cover, the Gibraltar Steamship Company owned and established Radio Swan on Swan Island, a covert black operation to win supporters for U.S. policies and discredit Fidel Castro. The Gibraltar Steamship Company did not own any steamships at the time while under the control of Thomas Dudley Cabot.

The radio station began acting as a regular commercial broadcaster with sponsors such as Kleenex, Phillip Morris Co., and others lined up, operating with a 50,000-watt transmitter on AM 1165 (early 1960s) and 1160 and on shortwave with a power of 7,500 watts on 6 MHz. The station's strategic location allowed it to target Cuba effectively, especially after U.S. President Dwight D. Eisenhower approved covert action against Castro in March 1960. As early as October 30, 1960, the Castro government sent reconnaissance flights over Swan Island and the Caribbean Coast of Guatemala (CIA 11-3-1960).

Swan Island was claimed by the governments of both the United States and Honduras, although the island was in the de facto hands of personnel acting on behalf of the Central Intelligence Agency (CIA).

The AM transmitter in use by Radio Swan had been used by Radio Free Europe and was taken to Swan Island by US Navy Seabees of Mobile Construction Battalion 6 on two LSTs. Along with erecting two radio transmission towers, the Seabees built a small facility with an airstrip, dock and quonset hut. At first all broadcasts of this pseudo-commercial radio station were in the Spanish language and it was announced on air as Radio Swan, la Voz Internacional del Caribe ("Radio Swan, the International Voice of the Caribbean"), with its initial commercial programming coming on tape recordings from anti-Castro political groups in exile.

Cuba responded to the broadcasts by setting up a jamming station to block the transmissions of Radio Swan and initiated La Voz de INRA, or The Voice of INRA, which represented the National Institute of Agrarian Reform with an anti-American message. This action was followed on January 3, 1961, by a break in diplomatic relations between both countries that had been initiated by the US. Following this action, Cuba commenced broadcasting to the US and to the world, with a new international service called Radio Havana Cuba.

In March 1961, Radio Swan stopped selling airtime for political programming, switching to an all-news format infused with coded messages. The station identified itself as supporting anti-Castro forces in Cuba and expanded its broadcasts to fourteen frequencies. The CIA issued a press release claiming its anti-Castro broadcasts were now being beamed by seven radio stations as well as Radio Swan.

A station identifying itself as Radio Swan briefly resumed broadcasts in 1975–1976 on 6.185 MHz. The station used a mailing address in San Pedro Sula, Honduras, and referred to itself as "La Primera Voz Democratica de Latinoamerica" ("The First Voice of Democracy in Latin America"). Since San Pedro Sula is located on the Honduran mainland, it is possible that these broadcasts originated there rather than on Swan Island, though no positive verification has been determined.

== Bay of Pigs invasion broadcasts ==
During the Bay of Pigs Invasion of Cuba, which took place between April 15–19, 1961, it became obvious to all concerned that the purpose of the station was to assist in the landings. But following the abortive invasion, Radio Swan suddenly changed format again. While its tone remained anti-Castro, its programming did not promote an uprising against the Cuban government. The station changed its format and name and Vanguard Service Corporation became new owners of the station. Radio Swan became Radio Americas and it remained on the air until May 1968 when the station closed down and its AM transmitter was transported to South Vietnam to assist in the wars of South-East Asia.

== The World Tomorrow radio program ==
One of the loyal sponsors who advertised on both Radio Swan and Radio Americas was Herbert W. Armstrong with The World Tomorrow radio program. In the January edition of his magazine The Plain Truth, a letter to the editor praised Armstrong by claiming that "... you could not have chosen a better station than Radio SWAN for reaching the Caribbean area. ... It is becoming popular with all those who share in the dislike of Fidel Castro and his communistic dictatorship." - Lady, Costa Rica.

In the same edition, his Radio Log listed his 'The World Tomorrow' program as being broadcast by Radio Swan in the English language at 6 p.m. on Sundays and at 9 p.m. on Saturdays and Sundays. This listing remained unchanged through the edition of January 1962. The February 1962 edition of his Radio Log listed the English-language broadcast at 6:30 p.m. on Sundays over Radio Americas, but on the same frequency as Radio Swan, while the Spanish-language broadcast was listed at the same times as before, but over Radio Swan. In the March edition, the Spanish-language broadcast was also listed as being heard over Radio Americas.

The World Tomorrow broadcast was also carried on several other radio stations around the world which also appeared to have a proprietary connection to the CIA.
