= Hugh Cabot III =

American painter (1930–2005)

- Born: March 22, 1930; Boston, Massachusetts, U.S.
- Died: May 23, 2005 (aged 75)
- Occupations: Painter, artist
- Known for: Oil paintings

Hugh Cabot III (March 22, 1930 – May 23, 2005) was an American artist. Best known for his oil paintings, he also worked with watercolor, pastels, graphite, charcoal, sculpture, and photography.

Cabot was born in Boston, Massachusetts, his parents Hugh Cabot II, Professor of Sociology, Harvard University, and Louise Melenson-Cabot. Hugh Cabot served in Korean War as an official United States Navy combat artist. His art produced during the Korean War hangs in the Naval Historical Center, Navy Art Collection in Washington, D.C.

Cabot is listed in Who's Who in American Art; Who's Who in International Art; Who's Who in the World; Who's Who in America, and Who's Who in the West. His works have been exhibited in many major museums throughout the United States and the world, and used as illustrations in several publications.

He lived and worked for 37 years in Tubac, Arizona, where his studio and gallery are located. Prior to Tubac he resided in Santa Fe, New Mexico, Taos, New Mexico, Fort Davis, Texas, and Fort Stockton, Texas.

He is survived by his children Jeffrey Harris Cabot, Mary Elizabeth Cabot-Case (Vermont) and John Chadwick Cabot (Massachusetts).
