= Eleanor Cabot Bradley Estate =

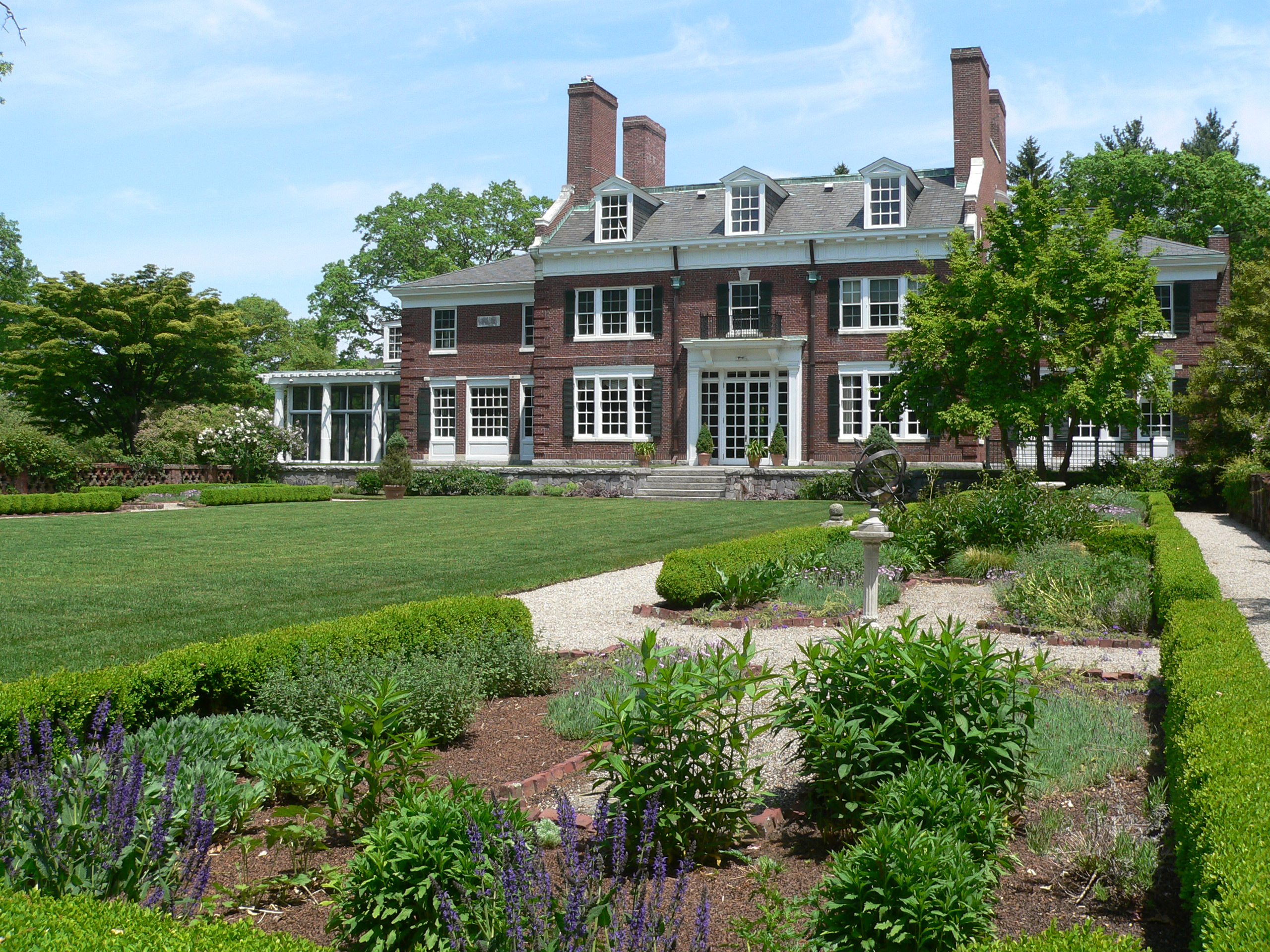
- Interactive map of the Eleanor Cabot Bradley Estate area

General information
- Type: House
- Architectural style: Country
- Location: 2468B Washington Street (Route 138); Canton, Massachusetts
- Coordinates: 42°11′58″N 71°07′15″W
- Governing body: The Trustees of Reservations

Dimensions
- Other dimensions: 90-acre estate

Website
- Eleanor Cabot Bradley Estate

The Eleanor Cabot Bradley Estate is a nonprofit country house and garden ground museum in Canton, Massachusetts. It is operated by The Trustees of Reservations. The grounds are open every day, sunrise to sunset, without charge.

== History ==
In 1902, Dr. Arthur Tracy Cabot hired architect Charles A. Platt to design a country house with landscaping and outlying farm buildings. Its formal grounds include lawns, a walled garden, and a parterre. Dr. Cabot had seven siblings, but no children. The estate was passed on to his niece, Eleanor Cabot (daughter of his brother, Godfrey Lowell Cabot), who married Major Ralph Bradley in 1919.

In 1945, she added ponds, a camellia house and greenhouse, and planted specimen trees. Additional land includes more than 60 acres (240,000 m^{2}) of meadows and woods, with some 3 miles (4.8 km) of walking trails.

The property was acquired through a bequest of Eleanor Cabot Bradley in 1991.

== Gallery ==
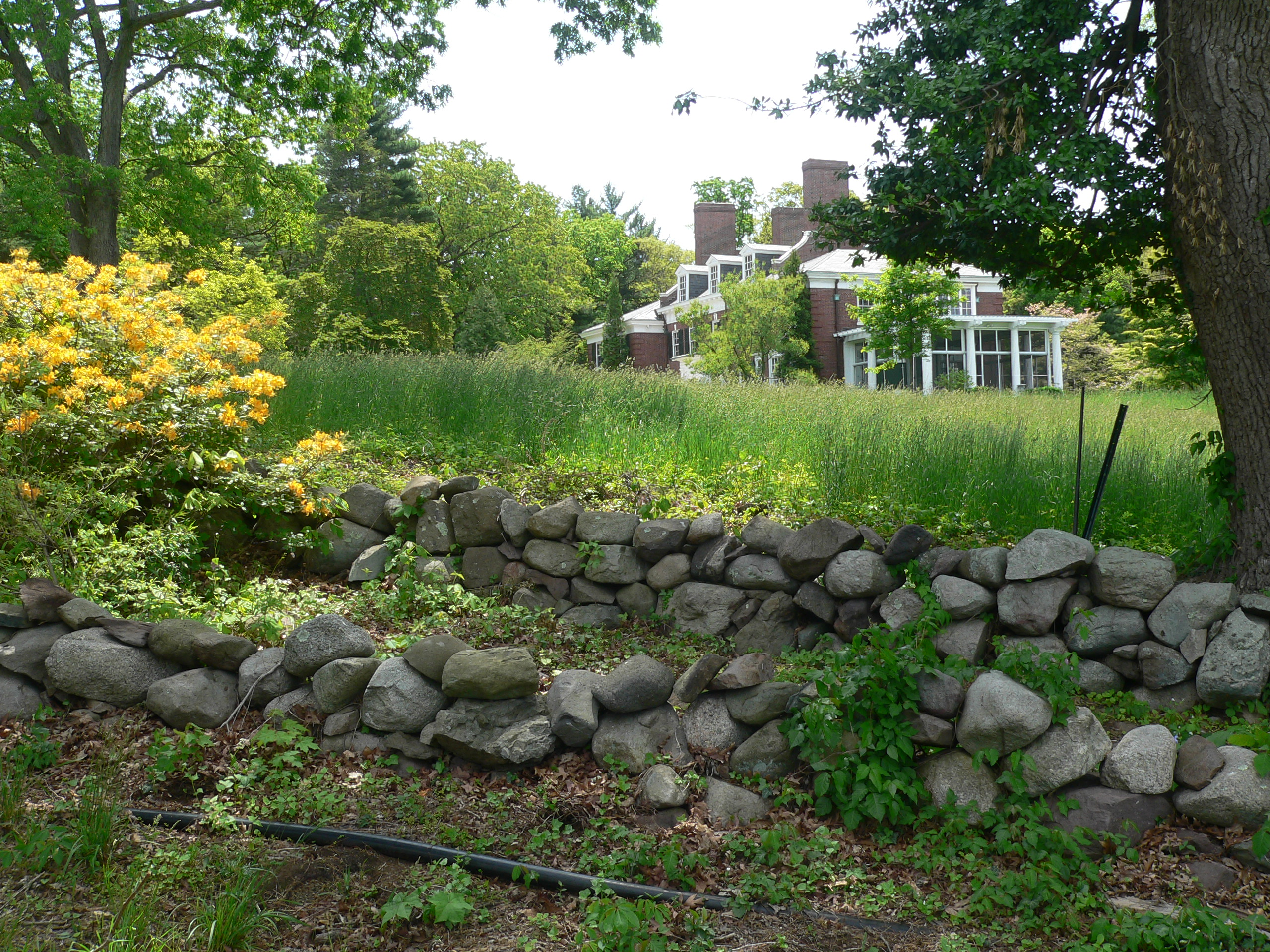
Estate house with stone fences

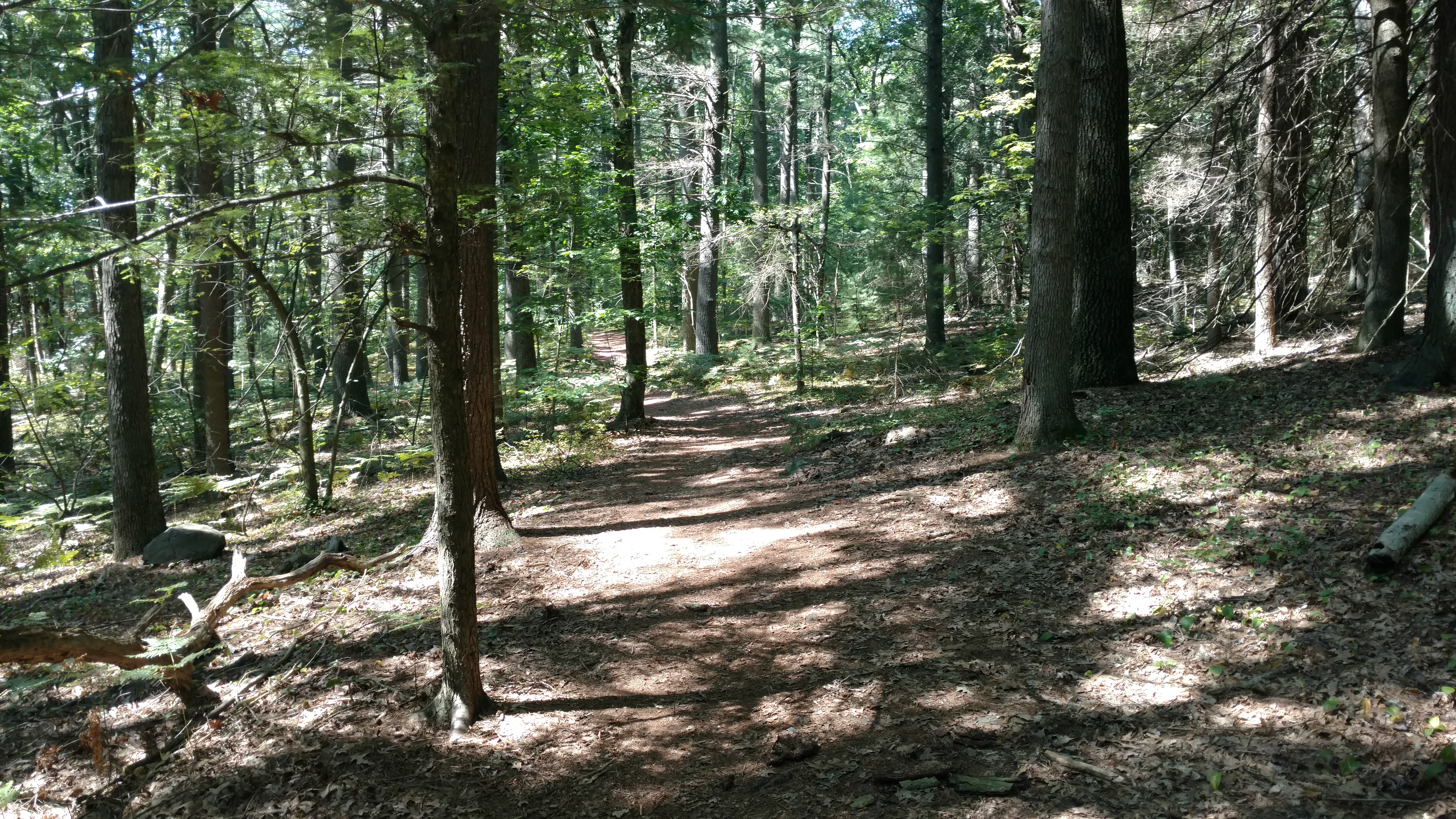
Walking trail

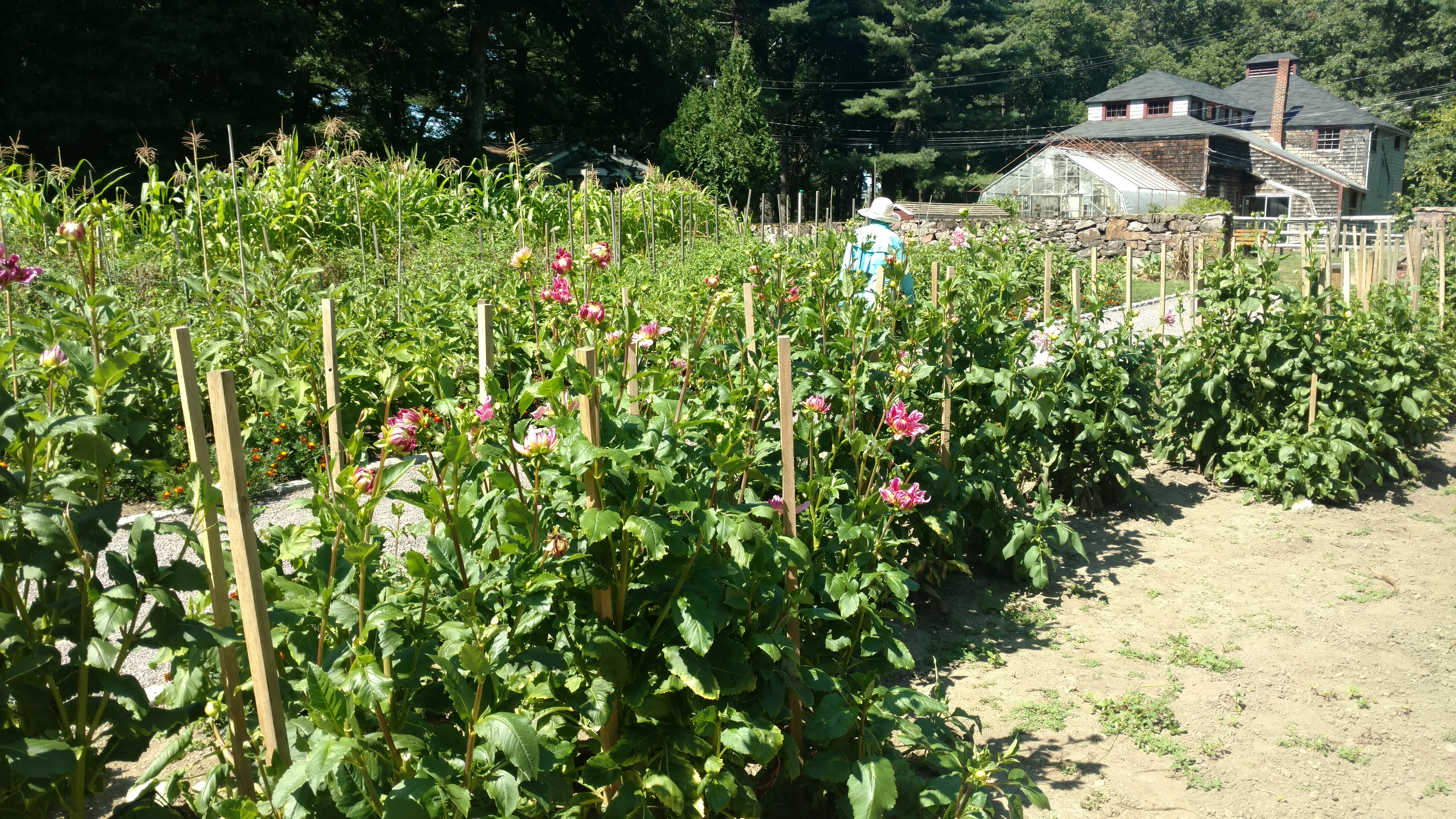
Kitchen garden

Rear view
