= Cabot Corporation =

American specialty chemicals company

- Type: Public
- Traded as: NYSE: CBT; S&P 400 component
- Industry: Chemicals
- Founded: 1882; 144 years ago
- Founder: Godfrey Lowell Cabot
- Headquarters: Boston, Massachusetts, US
- Key people: Sean D. Keohane, CEO; Michael Morrow, Non-Executive Chair of the Board
- Products: Activated carbon, aerogel, cesium formate, elastomer composites, masterbatches, rubber carbon black, graphene, inks and inkjet colorants, silicas, and aluminas
- Revenue: US$3.2 billion (2018)
- Net income: ▼US$113 million (2018)
- Total assets: US$3.2 billion (2018)
- Number of employees: 4,500
- Website: www.cabotcorp.com

Cabot Corporation is an American specialty chemicals and performance materials company headquartered in Boston, Massachusetts. The company operates in over 20 countries with 36 manufacturing plants, eight research and development facilities, and 28 sales offices.

== History ==
Cabot Corporation was founded by Godfrey Lowell Cabot in 1882 when he applied for a patent for a "carbon black making apparatus". The company incorporated in the state of Delaware in 1960.In 1993, a team of Cabot researchers developed a process for modifying the surface of carbon, allowing chemists and researchers to prepare surface modified carbon black products with properties never before associated with carbon materials. This breakthrough led to the development of new technologies and products including aqueous inkjet colorants, for printer ink the basis of Cabot's Inkjet Colorants business unit, which was founded in 1996.

In 2003, Cabot developed a commercialized process that allows continuous production of aerogels under ambient conditions, which was the start of the company’s Aerogel business. In 2009, Cabot completed construction of and began operating two additional rubber black production plants at its carbon black plant in Tianjin, China, increasing capacity to 150,000 metric tons. In July 2012, Cabot purchased Norit NV, the largest producer of activated carbon, for US$1.1 billion.

Cabot sold its Supermetals business, which produced tantalum, niobium, and related alloys, in 2011 to Australia-based Global Advanced Metals for $400 million.

== Safety, health and environmental ==
=== Safety record ===
The company has reduced total recordable injuries by over 25% in the last five years. However, the company experienced two fatalities in 2011. The severity of incidents has caused the company to look at all aspects of workplace safety.

=== Environmental record ===
Sam Bodman, CEO of Cabot during the coltan boom, was appointed in December 2004 to serve as President Bush’s Secretary of Energy. Under Bodman’s leadership from 1987 to 2000, according to Jason Leopold, Cabot was one of the U.S.’s largest polluters, accounting for 60,000 tons of airborne toxic emissions annually.

Cabot reduced its Environmental Non-Conformance events (ENCs), from a high of over 80 incidents in 2008, to 17 in FY 2012. The company defines an environmental non-conformance event as a reportable spill or release, a Notice of Violation, a public complaint or certain permit deviations.

The company invested over $35 million in FY 2011 on environmentally-related capital projects to improve efficiency and maintain regulatory compliance. The company’s goal is a 20% reduction in greenhouse gas emission intensity by 2020, using 2005 as the baseline year. One example of greenhouse gas reduction is a heat recovery advancement project to convert exhaust heat to steam at the company’s fumed metal oxides plant in Rheinfelden, Germany. The steam produced is used in the plant if needed or sold to a neighboring company. The project has the potential to reduce GHG emissions by 1,400 MTs each year.

=== Responsible care ===
In 2010 Cabot joined the American Chemistry Council, and as such is obliged to implement the Council’s Responsible Care program as part of a global initiative. Cabot is implementing RC 14001, which incorporates the requirements of both the ACC Responsible Care and the ISO 14001 Management Systems, for all its manufacturing facilities, beginning with those in North America.

== Awards ==
In 2012, Cabot Corporation was selected as a Bronze Winner for the Ninth Annual Team Massachusetts Economic Impact Awards. They were also selected as one of CR Magazine’s 100 Best Corporate Citizens for 2012.

The American Chemistry Council honored Cabot with the Responsible Care Performance Award in April 2012 for helping the ACC meet industry-wide safety and product stewardship targets. In April 2012, Cabot ranked forty-fourth among the top 100 leading companies that demonstrated superior management, mitigation and adaptation in the field of climate innovation. Cabot was awarded a 2012 Leadership Award for the Massachusetts Excellence in Commuter Options Awards.

== Cabot Foundation ==
In 1953, the non-profit Cabot Corporation Foundation, Inc. was established, and the Foundation's charter was amended in 1992 to permit grants to qualified charitable organizations outside of the United States. Cabot has offered aid to earthquake victims in Japan, and the Outward Bound organization.

== See also ==
- List of S&P 400 companies
