= Richard Clarke Cabot =

American physician (1868–1939)

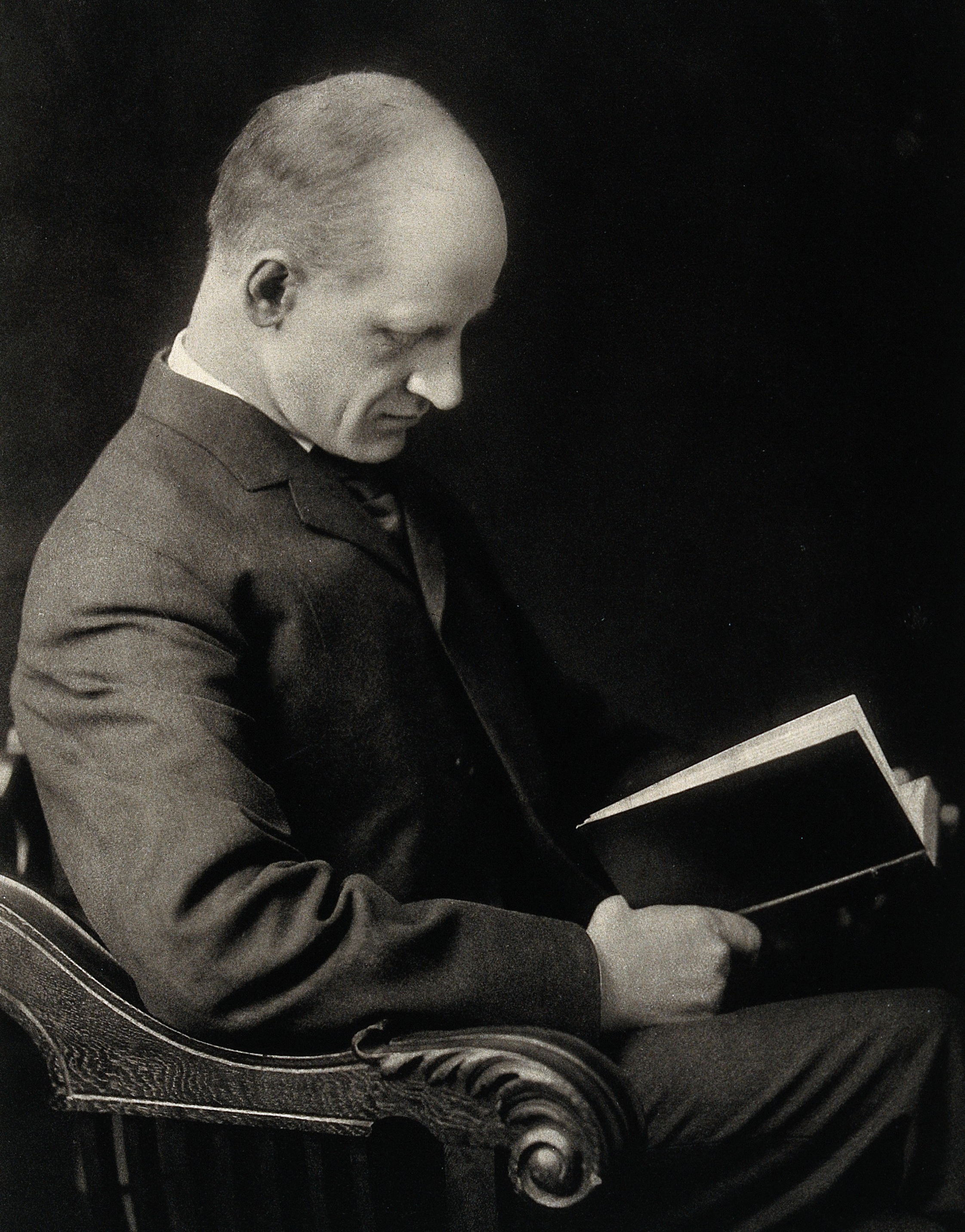
- Born: May 21, 1868; Brookline, Massachusetts
- Died: May 7, 1939 (aged 70); Cambridge, Massachusetts
- Education: Harvard University, A.B. summa cum laude, 1889; M.D., 1892
- Known for: Clinical hematology, pioneer in social work; discovered Cabot rings
- Spouse: Ella Lyman (m. 1894; died 1934)
- Parent(s): James Elliot Cabot and Elizabeth (Dwight) Cabot
- Relatives: The Cabot family

Richard Clarke Cabot (May 21, 1868 – May 7, 1939) was an American physician who advanced clinical hematology, was an innovator in teaching methods, and was a pioneer in social work.

== Early life and education ==
Richard Clarke Cabot was born May 21, 1868, in Brookline, Massachusetts, one of seven sons of James Elliot Cabot and Elizabeth (Dwight) Cabot. James Cabot was a philosopher and Harvard University professor who also trained as a lawyer and biographer, and was a friend of Ralph Waldo Emerson.

== Professional career ==
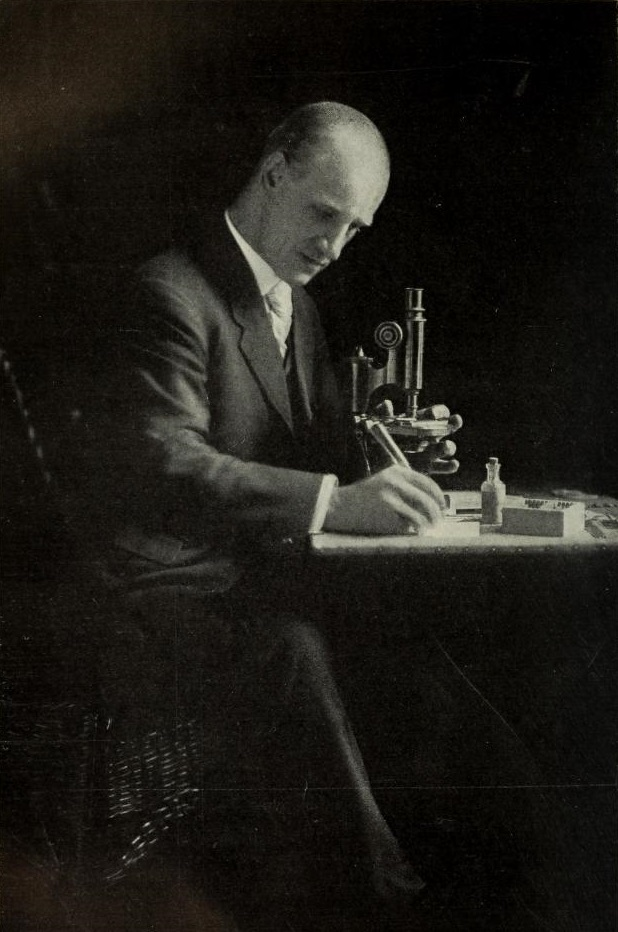
Cabot at work.

Cabot studied philosophy at Harvard University before switching to medicine. Inspired by the beliefs of John Dewey, Cabot felt more drawn to action than contemplation, and he admired the work of Teddy Roosevelt and Jane Addams. After completing his studies in 1892, he turned down the role of the first bacteriologist at Massachusetts General Hospital to work in the hospital's much less prestigious outpatient department. At this time, outpatient wards dealt mostly with people who couldn't afford inpatient treatment, or for the treatment of incurable chronic conditions such as tuberculosis or diabetes. This involved working populations who lived in unhealthy, overcrowded accommodation, often recent migrants.

He changed the way that the outpatient department was run, believing that economic, social, family and psychological conditions underpinned many of the conditions that patients presented with. He envisaged that social workers would work in a complementary relationship with doctors, the former concentrating on physiological health, and the latter on social health. In addition to this, he saw that social work could improve medicine by providing a critical perspective on it while working alongside it in an organisational setting. In 1905 Cabot created one of the first positions of professional social worker in the world, given to Garnet Pelton, and then to Ida Maud Cannon. Although Clarke credited his approach as similar to that of Anne Cummins in London. The hospital refused to support the hiring of social workers, and Cabot had to pay their wages himself. Pelten developed tuberculosis herself soon after taking up the position and was forced to retire. Cannon stayed in the position for forty years and became Head of Social Work at the hospital. Cabot and Cannon pioneered many programs to improve the health of patients, including art classes for psychiatric patients, low-cost meals for patients and research on the social factors that increased a person's likelihood of developing tuberculosis.

In 1917 Cabot took up a position in the Medical Reserve Corps for a year. He returned briefly to Massachusetts General Hospital in 1918 and then left to take up the position of chair at Harvard's Department of Social Ethics in 1919. At this time, the hospital agreed to pay the wages of social workers, as up to this point, Cabot had paid the wages of thirteen social workers over the last 12 years. He went on to write about his experiences in his book Social Work

He is also credited with discovering Cabot rings, and for describing, along with his colleague, Locke, the eponymous Cabot-Locke murmur, a diastolic murmur occasionally heard in severe anemia, unrelated to heart valve abnormalities.

Cabot established a tradition of teaching conferences at Massachusetts General Hospital (MGH) that featured generating differential diagnoses, and founded the long-standing feature of Case Record of MGH in New England Journal of Medicine.

== Family and personal life ==
Cabot's paternal grandfather, Samuel Cabot Jr., became a sailor at age 19 and married Elizabeth Perkins, daughter of a successful Boston trader. Samuel Cabot III later took over the running of the firm.

Richard married Ella Lyman (1866–1934) in 1894; they both held Transcendentalist views. This philosophy, as well as his parents' commitment to philanthropy, had a strong influence on Richard. Around the end of the 19th century, such ideals were out of favor, with the dominant beliefs at the time being social Darwinism.

== See also ==
- Cambridge Somerville Youth Study
