= Thomas Handasyd Perkins =

Boston slave trader, opium smuggler, philanthropist (1764–1854)

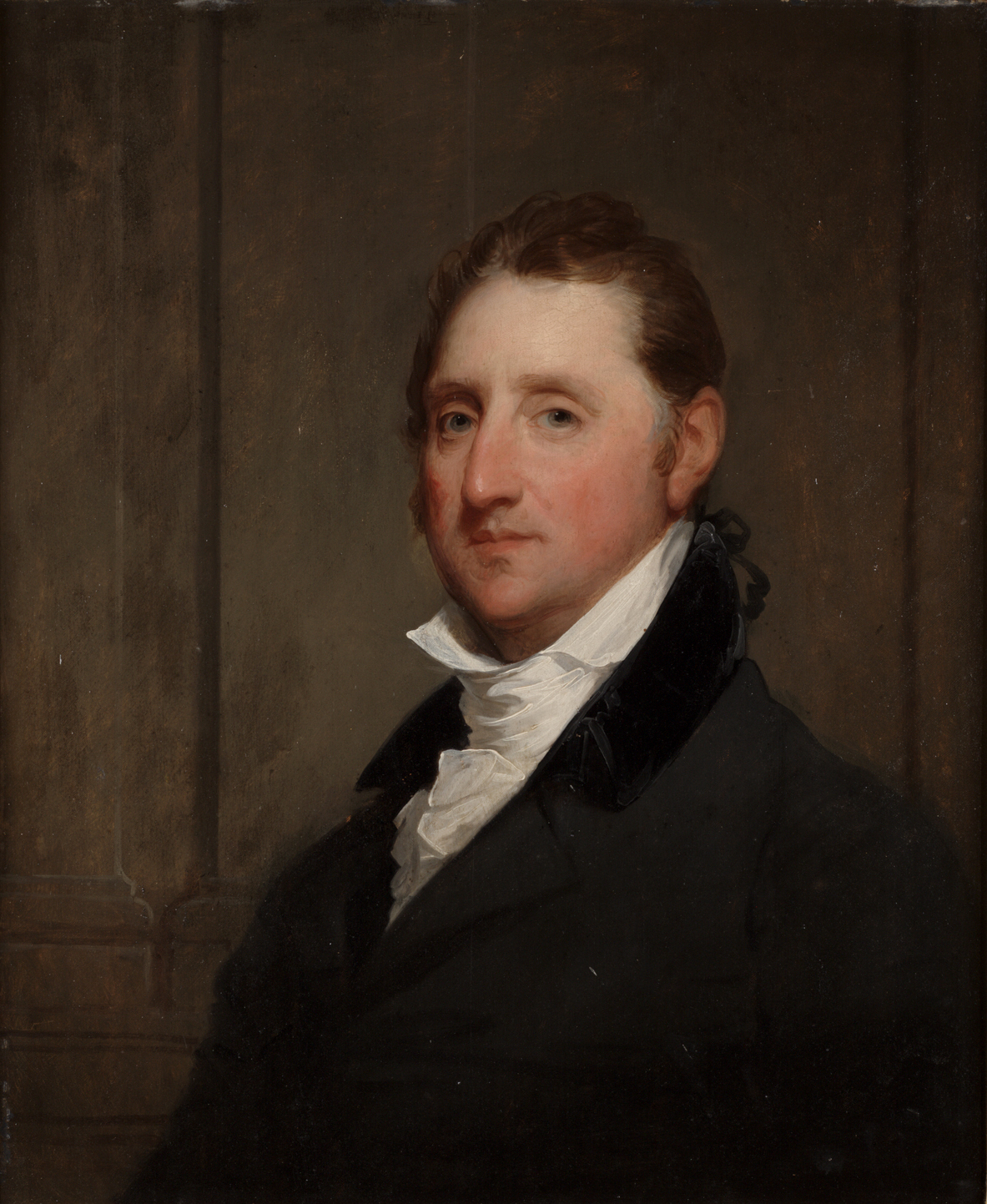
- Portrait by Gilbert Stuart, 1805
- Born: December 15, 1764; Boston, Massachusetts
- Died: January 11, 1854 (aged 89); Brookline, Massachusetts
- Occupation: Shipping magnate
- Spouse: Sarah Elliott (m. 1788; died 1852)
- Children: 6
- Parent(s): James Perkins; Elizabeth Peck
- Relatives: Edward Clarke Cabot (grandson); James Elliot Cabot (grandson); Samuel Cabot III (grandson); Elizabeth Cabot Agassiz (granddaughter)

Colonel Thomas Handasyd Perkins, also known as T. H. Perkins (December 15, 1764 – January 11, 1854), was an American merchant, slave trader, smuggler and philanthropist from a wealthy Boston Brahmin family. Starting with bequests from his grandfather and father-in-law, he amassed a huge fortune. As a young man, he traded slaves in Saint-Domingue, worked as a maritime fur trader trading furs from the American Northwest to China, and then turned to smuggling Turkish opium into China. His philanthropic contributions include the Perkins School for the Blind, renamed in his honor; the Boston Museum of Fine Arts; McLean Hospital; along with having a hand in founding the Massachusetts General Hospital.

== Early life ==
Perkins was born on December 15, 1764, in Boston, Massachusetts. His parents, James Perkins and Elizabeth Peck, had ten children in eighteen years. His nephew John Perkins Cushing was active in Perkins' China business for 30 years; the town of Belmont, Massachusetts, is named for his estate. His great-nephew Charles Callahan Perkins became a well known artist, author and philanthropist like his grandfather James Perkins.

When Perkins was twelve, he was in the crowd which first heard the Declaration of Independence read to the citizens of Boston. The family had planned to send Perkins to Harvard College, but he had no interest in a college education.

== Career ==
In 1779, he began working, and in 1785, when he turned 21, he became legally entitled to a small bequest that had been left to him by his grandfather, Thomas Handasyd Peck, a Boston merchant who dealt largely in furs and hats. When China opened the port of Canton to foreign businesses in 1785, Perkins became one of the first Boston merchants to engage in the Old China Trade. He sailed as supercargo on the Astrea, captain James Magee, owned by Elias Hasket Derby, to Canton in 1789 with a cargo including ginseng, cheese, lard, wine, and iron. On the trip back it carried tea and silk cloth. During this period, Perkins also traded slaves in Cap‑Français, a port city in the French colony of Saint-Domingue. In 1793, he permanently stopped doing business in Saint-Domingue due to the Haitian Revolution.

In 1815, Perkins and his brother James opened a Mediterranean office to buy Turkish opium for resale in China. Perkins was also a major industrial investor within Massachusetts. He owned the Granite Railway, the first commercial American railroad, which was built to carry granite from Quincy quarries to Charlestown for construction of the Bunker Hill Monument and other city buildings in Boston. He also held significant holdings in the Elliot textile mills in Newton, the mills at Holyoke and Lowell, New England canals and railroads, and lead and iron mines including the Monkton Iron Company in Vergennes, Vermont. In addition, Perkins was politically active in the Federalist Party, serving terms as state senator and representative from 1805–1817. Additionally, he invested in many of the mills on Lowell, MA including Appleton Mills.

=== Philanthropy ===
In later years Perkins became a philanthropist. In 1826, he and his brother, James Perkins, contributed half the sum of $30,000 (approximately $1,010,000 in 2025) that was needed for an addition to the Boston Athenaeum, and the old Boston Athenaeum Gallery of Art was moved to James Perkins's home. The Perkins School for the Blind, still in existence in Watertown, Massachusetts, was renamed in his honor after he donated his Boston mansion to the financially troubled "Massachusetts Asylum for the Blind" in 1832. He was also a major benefactor to the Boston Museum of Fine Arts, McLean Hospital, and helped to found the Massachusetts General Hospital.

== Gloucester sea serpent ==
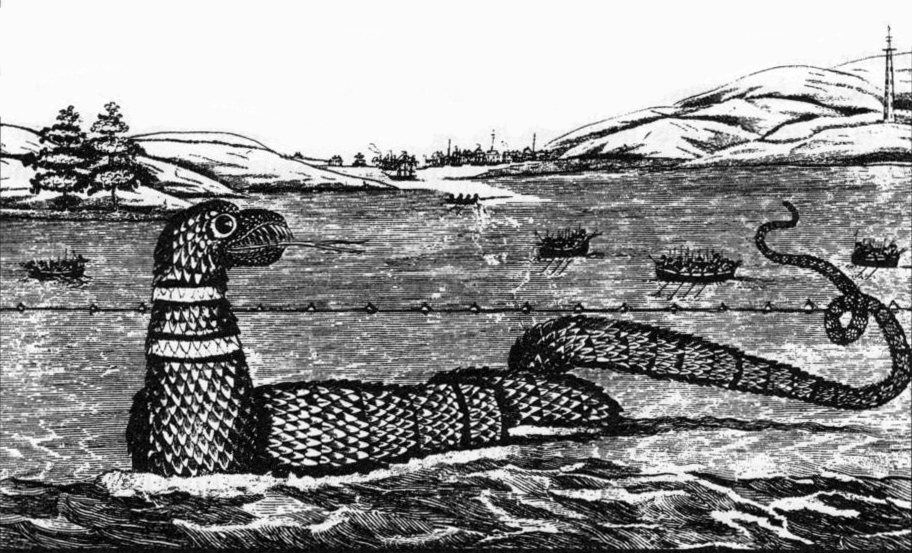
The Gloucester sea serpent of 1817

Thomas Perkins was also involved in the 1817 Gloucester sea serpent sightings in Gloucester Harbor, an event whose academic legacy would not be felt until the old age of his great-grandson Godfrey Lowell Cabot. Throughout the summer of 1817, a sea serpent was reportedly seen by hundreds of people, including the crews of four whaling boats. Described as "a sixty-foot-long creature" by coastal vessel captain Parson Bentley, a skeptical Colonel Perkins decided to attempt to observe it himself.

When they arrived at Gloucester, they found everybody on the alert. Many said they had seen "him" — though nobody claimed they had actually gotten close enough to verify the gender. The sea was perfectly smooth. Lee and Perkins picked out an advantageous spot on a point of land projecting into the harbor. Perkins had brought a powerful spyglass with him just in case. Scanning the water, he suddenly noticed an "agitation" at the harbor entrance, "like that which follows a small vessel going five or six miles an hour through the water." Knowing of no shoal where the "agitation" was, he exclaimed to Lee that he had no doubt but that he had seen the sea serpent in pursuit of fish. Lee had not been looking in that direction, and by the time he did, the "agitation" had ceased. In a few minutes, however, the colonel saw on the opposite side of the harbor, "at about two miles distance from where I had first seen, or thought I saw, the snake" the same object moving rapidly up the harbor on the western shore. Now Lee saw it too. As the object approached them, they observed that its motion was not like that of a common snake, either on land or in the water, "but evidently the verticle movement of the caterpillar." As nearly as the colonel could judge, about forty feet of the creature's body was visible at any one time.

Perkins' published report of his experience became part of his family's lore and, two years later in 1819 his daughter and son-in-law Eliza and Samuel Cabot Jr. were among the many who reported sighting a sea serpent off the coast of Nahant This news caused a "sea serpent mania" along the coast of Massachusetts but, most importantly, it sparked an interest in such fabled creatures in Eliza and Samuel Cabot Jr.'s grandson Godfrey Lowell Cabot. While in his nineties, Godfrey Cabot sponsored the restoration of the Harvard Museum of Comparative Zoology's (MCZ) complete Kronosaurus skeleton. Having again been interested in sea serpents since childhood and thus often questioning MCZ director Alfred Romer about the existence and reports of sea serpents, it thus occurred to Dr. Romer to tell Mr. Cabot about the unexcavated Kronosaurus skeleton in the museum closet. Godfrey Cabot then asked how much a restoration would cost and "Romer, pulling a figure out of the musty air, replied, 'Oh, about $10,000.'" Romer may not have been serious but the philanthropist clearly was because the check for said sum came shortly thereafter.

== Personal life ==
On March 25, 1788, Perkins married Sarah "Sally" Elliott (1768–1852) in Boston, Massachusetts. Together, they had the following children:

- Elizabeth Perkins (1791–1885), who married Samuel Cabot Jr. (1784–1863).
- Sarah Eliot Perkins (1793–1856)
- Col. Thomas Handasyd Perkins, Jr. (1796–1850), who was known as "Short-arm Tom" and who married Jane Frances Rebecca Dumaresq (1799–1856), the "famous beauty of Kennebec."
- Mary Ann Cushing Perkins (1798–1880), who married Thomas Graves Cary (1791–1859).
- Caroline Perkins (1800–1867), who married William Howard Gardiner (1797–1880), son of Bishop John Sylvester John Gardiner.
- Nancy Cushing Perkins (1806–1889), who married William Ferdinand Cary (1796–1881).

Upon retirement, Perkins built a summer home on Swan Island in the Kennebec River near Richmond, Maine. He helped the island achieve independent municipal status by paying legal fees for its charter and the town was renamed Perkins in gratitude. It is now Perkins Township, a ghost town.

Colonel Perkins died on January 11, 1854, in Brookline, Massachusetts, and is buried in the family plot at Mount Auburn Cemetery.

=== Descendants ===
Through his son, he was the grandfather of Louisa Perkins, who married prominent Boston painter William Morris Hunt.

Through his daughter Elizabeth, he was the grandfather of seven grandsons, including Edward Clarke Cabot (b. 1818), an architect and artist, James Elliot Cabot (b. 1821), a philosopher and author, and Samuel Cabot III, a surgeon and ornithologist.

Through his daughter Mary Ann, he was the grandfather of Mary Cary, who married Harvard Professor Cornelius Conway Felton (later president of Harvard University), and Elizabeth Cabot Cary (1822–1907), the co-founder and first president of Radcliffe College, who married Louis Agassiz (1807–1873), a Swiss-American biologist and geologist.

Through his daughter Caroline, he was the grandfather of William Prescott Gardiner (1824–1860), Edward Gardiner (1825–1859), a co-founder of the American Society of Civil Engineers and Architects and the American Institute of Architects, Mary Cary Gardiner (1827–1863), John Sylvester Gardiner (1830–1856), Caroline Louisa Gardiner (1832–1888), and Charles Perkins Gardiner (1836–1864).
