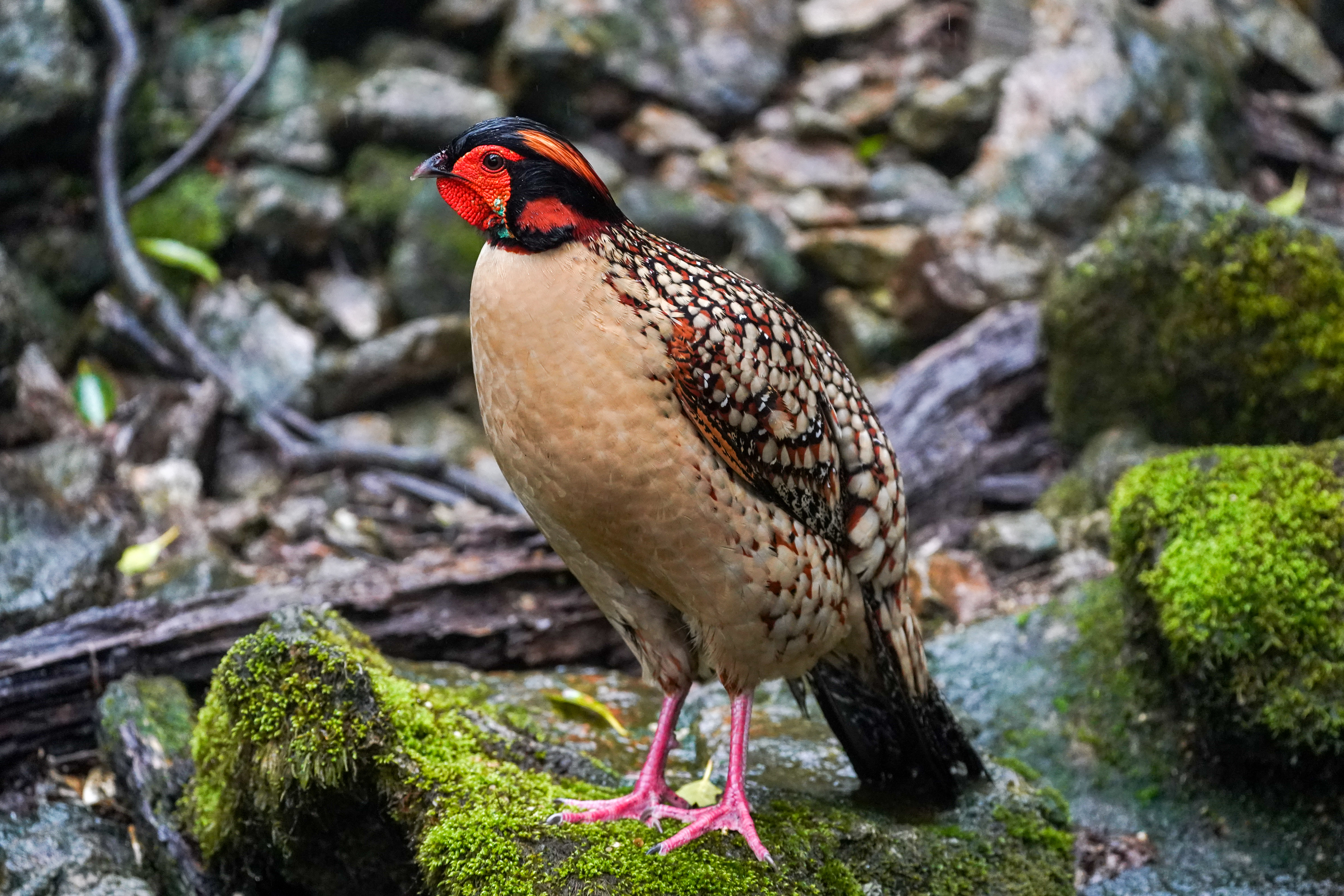
- Male

Conservation status
- Vulnerable (IUCN 3.1)
- CITES Appendix I

Scientific classification
- Kingdom: Animalia
- Phylum: Chordata
- Class: Aves
- Order: Galliformes
- Family: Phasianidae
- Genus: Tragopan
- Species: T. caboti

Binomial name
- Tragopan caboti (Gould, 1857)

= Cabot's tragopan =

Species of bird

Cabot's tragopan (Tragopan caboti) is a pheasant found in south-east China. The common and scientific names of this large bird both commemorate the ornithologist Samuel Cabot III. Other common names include the Chinese tragopan and the yellow-bellied tragopan. The population is divided into two subspecies, of which the dominant subspecies is found in the provinces of Fujian, Jiangxi, Zhejiang, and Guangdong, and T. c. guangxiensis is confined to northeastern Guangxi and southern Hunan. The IUCN has assessed it as being a "vulnerable species".

== Description ==
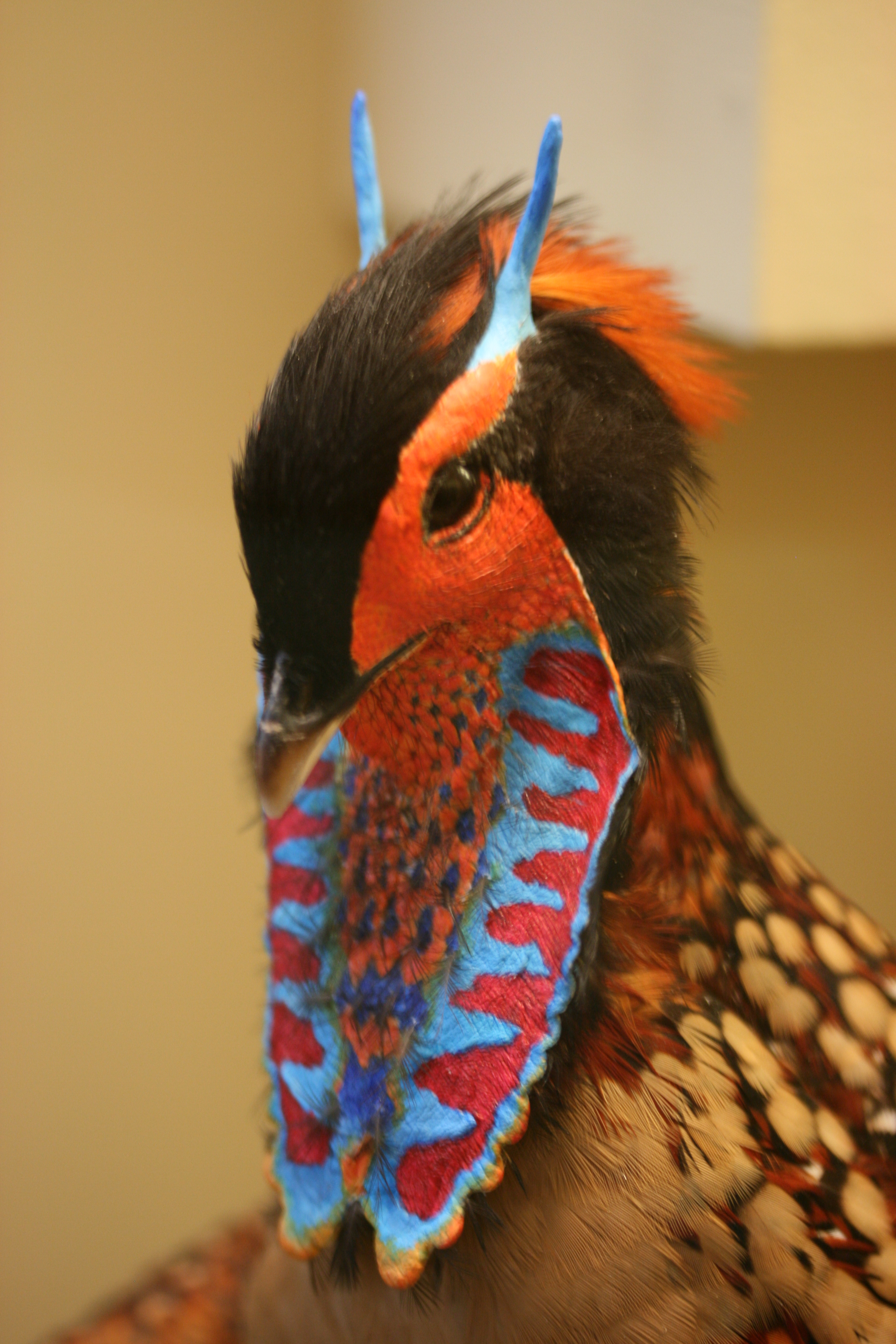
Male Cabot's tragopan, with wattles and horns extended

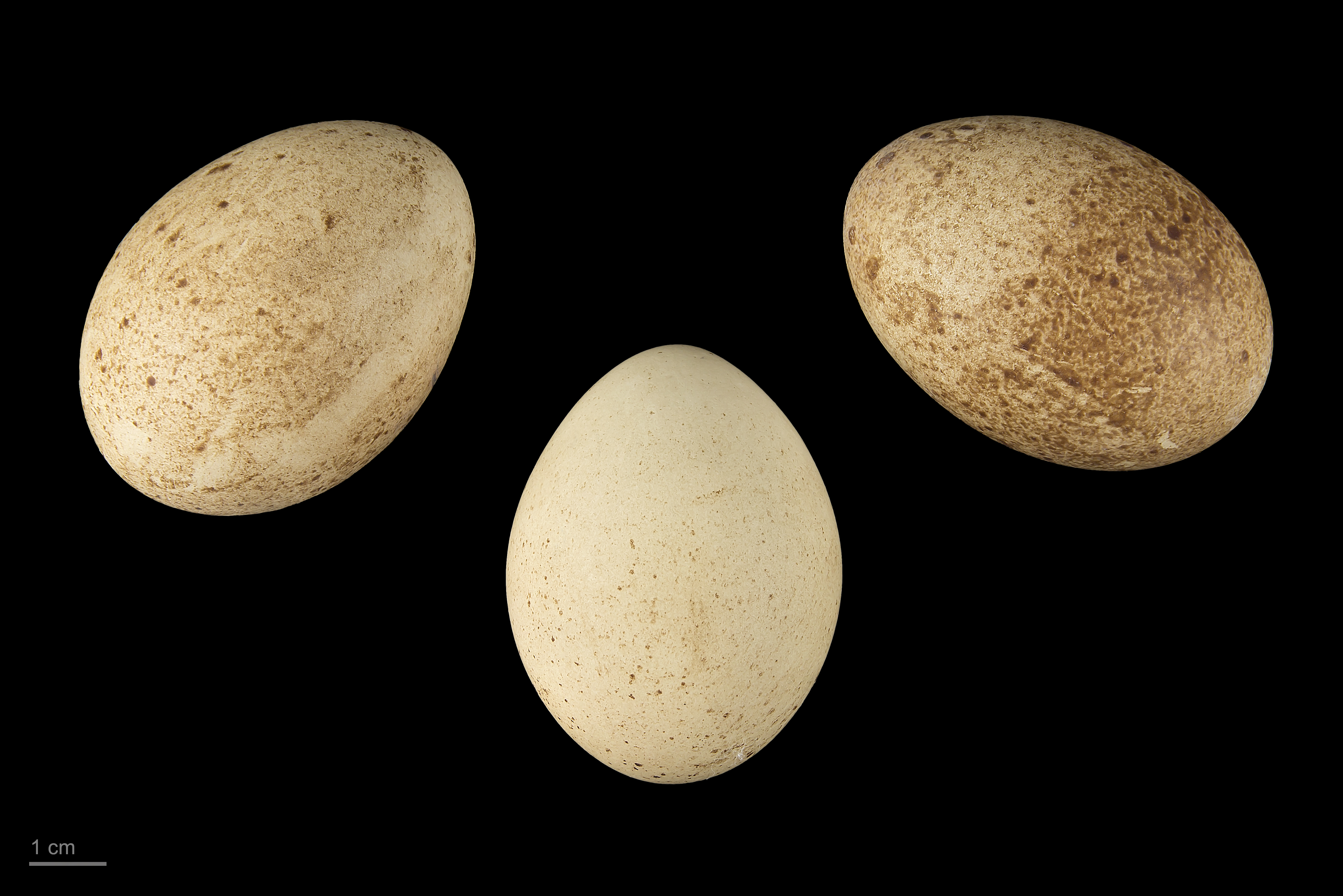
Tragopan caboti - MHNT

Cabot's tragopan is a plump ground-dwelling bird with relatively short legs. The male grows to a length of about 60 cm (24 in) and a weight of around 1.4 kg (3 lb) while the female is about 10 cm (4 in) shorter and weighs around 0.9 kg (2 lb). The head of the male is black with reddish-orange streaks on either side and on the neck and similar-coloured bare skin on the cheeks and around the eye. Below the beak dangle blue and orange decorative, inflatable wattles and there are a pair of fleshy blue "horns" over the eyes. The upper parts of the body are reddish-brown, with large buff markings and the underparts are straw-coloured. The female is altogether a less-colourful bird. The head and upper parts are reddish-brown spotted with black and marked with triangular-shaped white patches and the underparts are greyish-brown with white markings.

== Distribution and habitat ==
Cabot's tragopan is endemic to mountain ranges in southeastern China where it is present in the provinces of Fujian, Guangdong, Guangxi, Hunan, Jiangxi and Zhejiang. Its typical habitat is subtropical evergreen forest and other forests with a mix of deciduous and coniferous trees. Its altitudinal range is 600 to 1,800 metres (2,000 to 5,900 ft) and it is also present above the treeline. Populations are fragmented as it has limited ability to disperse and seems not to move across gaps in forest cover of over 500 metres (1,600 ft).

== Taxonomy ==
Cabot's tragopan has two recognized subspecies:

- T. c. caboti (Gould, 1857) – southeast China
- T. c. guangxiensis Cheng T. & Wu M., 1979 – Guangxi, south-central China

== Behaviour ==
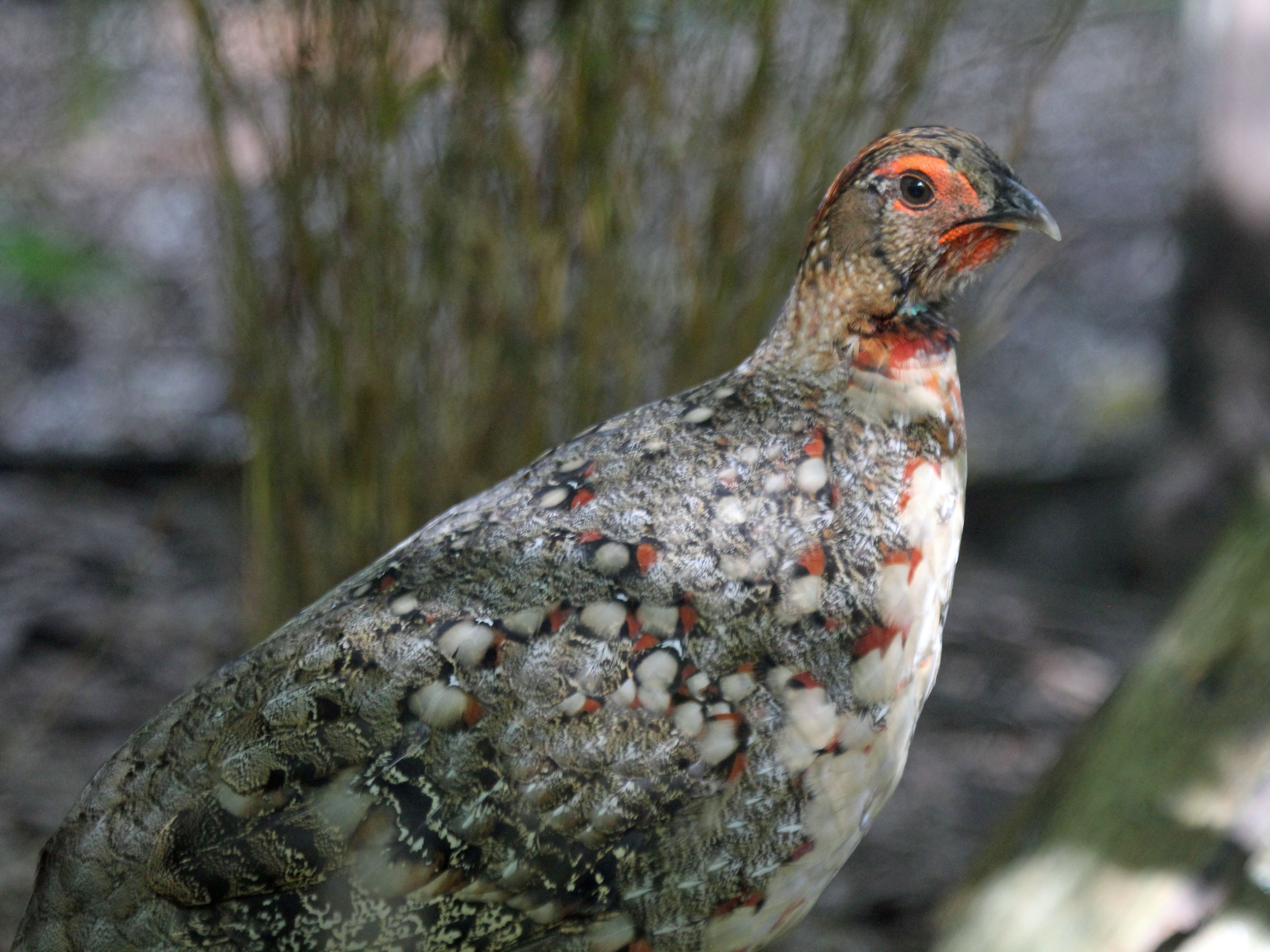
Sub-adult male

Cabot's tragopan feeds mostly on the ground, foraging for roots, shoots, buds, flowers, fruits and seeds. A favourite food is the fruit and leaves of Daphniphyllum macropodum, a small tree which is also used for roosting at night. Small invertebrates are also sometimes eaten.

Breeding takes place in the spring and Cabot's tragopan has an elaborate courtship ritual. The nest is usually built off the ground in a fork in a tree and is made of grasses, mosses, feathers and leaves, but sometimes an empty nest of another bird species is used. A clutch of two to six eggs is laid and incubation is performed solely by the female. The eggs hatch in about twenty eight days and the female broods the young for two or three days after that. They then all leave the nest together, the chicks being able to fly soon after they hatch, and remain together for the winter, possibly joining with another family in a small group.

== Conservation status ==
Cabot's tragopan is assessed by the International Union for Conservation of Nature as being a "vulnerable species". This is because it is estimated that there are fewer than ten thousand individuals and that the number of birds is decreasing. The main threat it faces are loss of habitat as natural forest is converted to agricultural land or plantations of conifers and bamboo. This reduces the availability of suitable nesting sites in the forks of trees, but it is hoped that the provision of artificial nesting platforms may help. The bird is present in some protected areas but these are mostly small. Illegal hunting still takes place in some areas. The zoo studbook holder for this species is Zoo Praha.

== See also ==
- List of endangered and protected species of China
