= Charles Hammond Gibson Jr. =

American poet

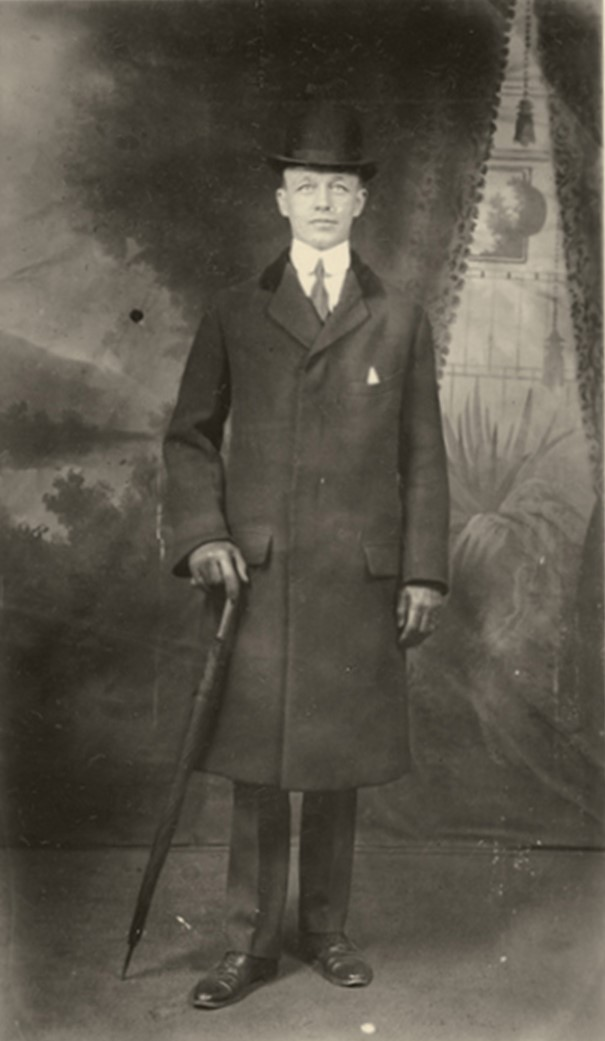
Charles Hammond Gibson Jr.

Charles Hammond Gibson Jr. (1874 – November 17, 1954) was an American author from a wealthy Bostonian family who created the Gibson House Museum to preserve his family mansion as a Victorian time-box.

== Biography ==
Charles Hammond Gibson was born in 1874 the son of Charles Hammond Gibson Sr (1836–1916), and Rosamond Warren (1846–1934). He had two sisters, Mary Ethel (1873–1938, married Freeman Allen) and Rosamond (1878–1953, married Charles Gibson Winslow). Gibson attended private schools in Boston; then St. Paul's School in Concord, New Hampshire and finally the School of Architecture at the Massachusetts Institute of Technology, but never graduated.

After school, he travelled to Europe and became the secretary of Alfred Harmsworth, 1st Viscount Northcliffe, assisting him in the preparation of the Jackson–Harmsworth Polar Exposition of 1894. He wrote poetry, publishing his first sonnet in the Boston Transcript in 1894. He privately printed The Spirit of Love and Other Poems (1906) and The Wounded Eros, Sonnets (1908), one novel Two Gentlemen in Touraine (1899) (as Richard Sudbury, a fictional romance about the relationship with Maurice Talvande, Count de Mauny Talvande, owner of Taprobane Island, but also a chronicle of castles and churches in France, which became a sought after travel book), and one illustrated travel book, Among French Country Inns. He dedicated his poetry to Winston Churchill and Queen Elizabeth II, who both sent back thank you notes.

He was chairman and charter member of the Boston Authors Club, he was at the organizational meeting at the home of Julia Ward Howe. Beginning of the 1900s he worked as an investment banker. Gibson was also famous for his rose gardens that he created at Forty Steps, the family's summer home in Nahant, Massachusetts. In 1906 he was invited to the White House by President Theodore Roosevelt, for the wedding of Alice Roosevelt Longworth.

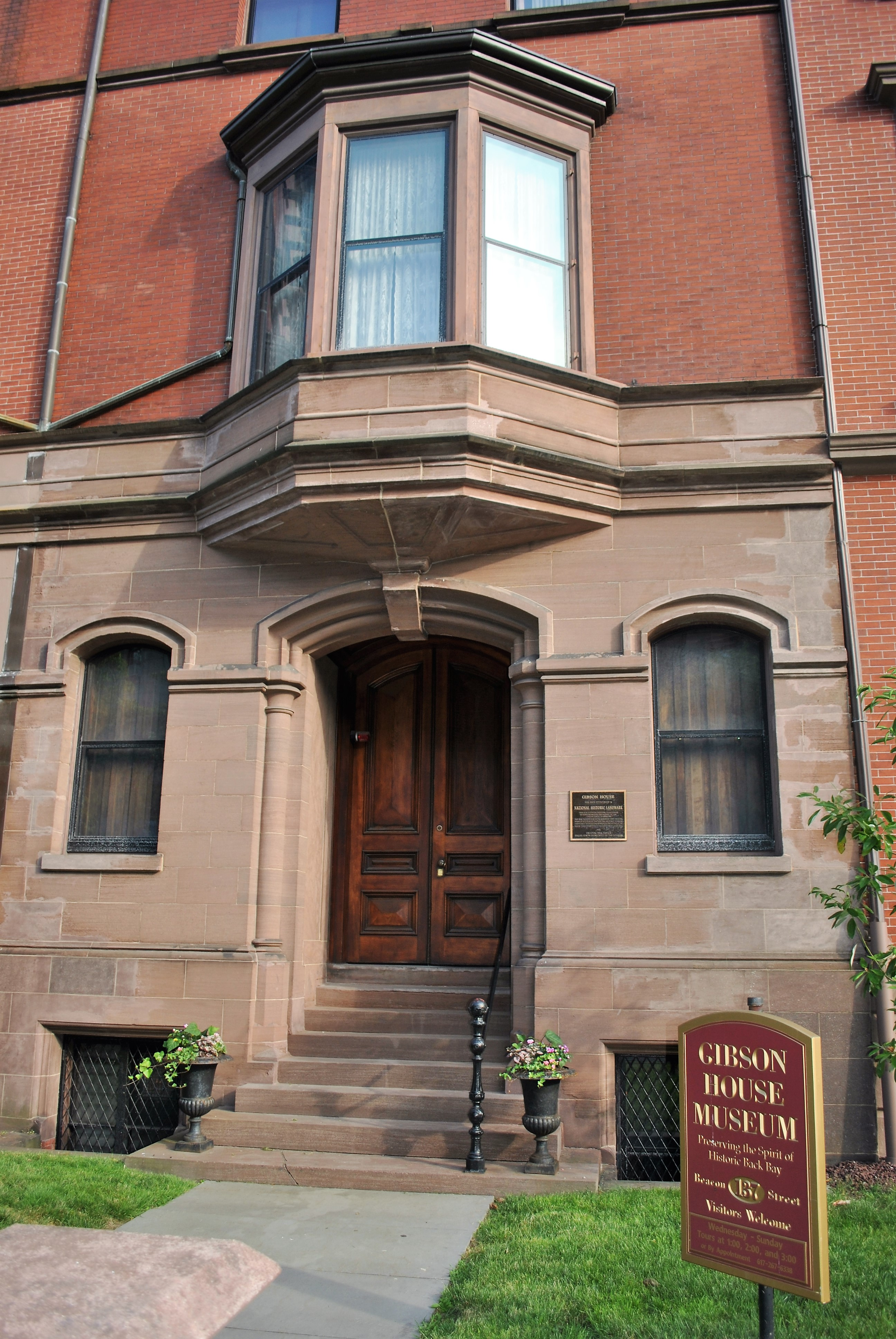
Gibson House Museum, Boston, MA

In 1909, Gibson moved to 59 Beacon and then, in 1910, to 48 Beacon. He continued to live there until 1911–1912 when he moved to 121 Beacon. After his father died in 1916, he moved back with his mother at 137 Beacon, the family mansion. In 1914 he was appointed Boston's parks commissioner and in this role he designed a "convenience station" for the Boston Common inspired by the Petit Trianon at Versailles; nicknamed the "Gibson's Folly", it reopened first as a restaurant Earl of Sandwich and in 2025 as a Flour bakery.

In February 1953 answering a request from Harvard University, he recorded himself reading his own poetry, and those recordings are available today at The Woodberry Poetry Room, part of Harvard's Houghton Library and housed in Lamont Library. Gibson died on November 17, 1954, and is buried at Mount Auburn Cemetery.

Between 1847 and 1849 Edward Clarke Cabot designed what is now the Gibson House Museum for Catherine Hammond Gibson and her son Charles Hammond Gibson. Three generations of the Gibson family lived there before Charles Hammond Gibson Jr. ensured the house would be preserved "as is" a time-box of the Victorian era. It opened 3 years after his death.

== Legacy ==
The Wounded Eros - Remembering Charles Hammond Gibson. Jr. (1874-1954) is a short movie by Todd Gernes.
