= Louis Cabot House =

Historic house in New Hampshire, United States

- U.S. National Register of Historic Places
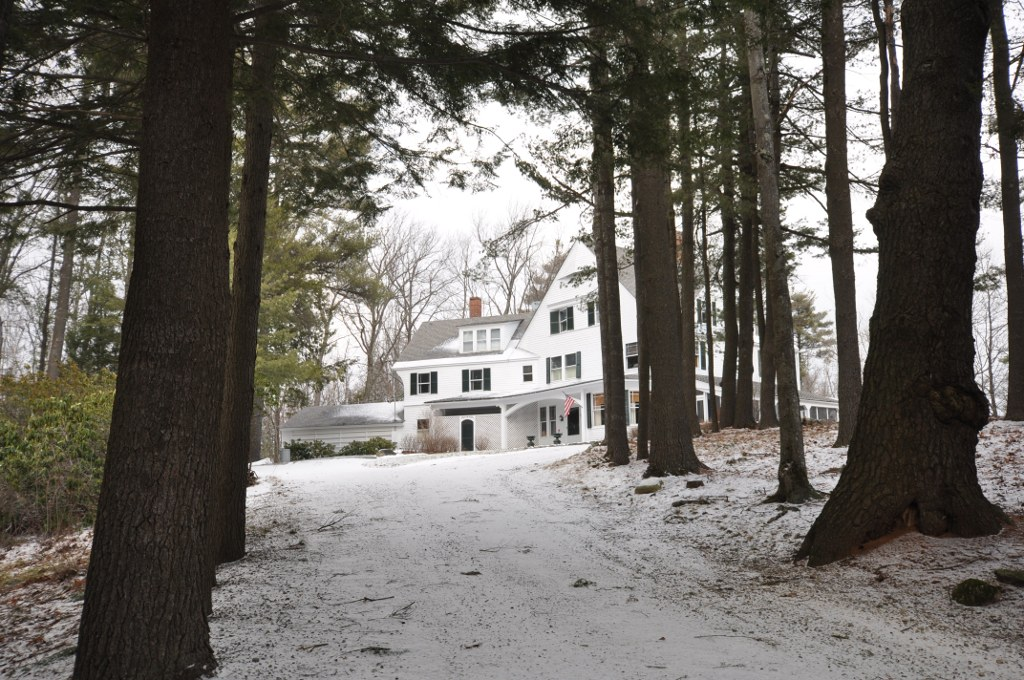

- Location within New Hampshire Location within the United States
- Location: Windmill Hill Rd., Dublin, New Hampshire
- Coordinates: 42°53′25″N 72°2′11″W
- Area: 2.1 acres (0.85 ha)
- Built: 1887
- Architectural style: Shingle Style
- MPS: Dublin MRA
- NRHP reference No.: 83004015
- Added to NRHP: December 18, 1983

The Louis Cabot House is a historic house on Windmill Hill Road in Dublin, New Hampshire. Built in 1887, it is a distinctive local example of Shingle style architecture, and was the centerpiece of the large country estate of industrialist Louis Cabot. The house was listed on the National Register of Historic Places in 1983.

== Description and history ==
The Louis Cabot House is located in a rural setting southeast of the center of Dublin, atop a knoll on the northeast side of Windmill Hill Road southeast of Pierce Road. It has a 3 1/2-story main block, to which a substantial 2 1/2-story wing is attached at an angle. The primary facade is oriented facing south, with views toward Mount Monadnock. It is fronted by a shed-roof porch, and has a large gabled dormer projecting from the roof face. That gable and the main block end gables feature eyebrow-like projections. The main entrance is on the west side, sheltered by a portico with an arched valance.

In 1886, Louis Cabot, a businessman from Brookline, Massachusetts whose family manufactured Cabot Stain, purchased two farms in this area. This house was built the following year, and became the centerpiece of a gentleman farmer's estate of some 2,000 acres (810 ha). The property also included a period barn that was one of the largest ever built in Dublin. The house was probably designed by Cabot's cousin, Edward Clarke Cabot, and is one of Dublin's major examples of the Shingle Style. The estate was sold off in pieces by the family after Cabot's death in 1912.

== See also ==
- National Register of Historic Places listings in Cheshire County, New Hampshire
