= Howe House (Cambridge, Massachusetts) =

Historic house in Massachusetts, United States

- U.S. National Register of Historic Places
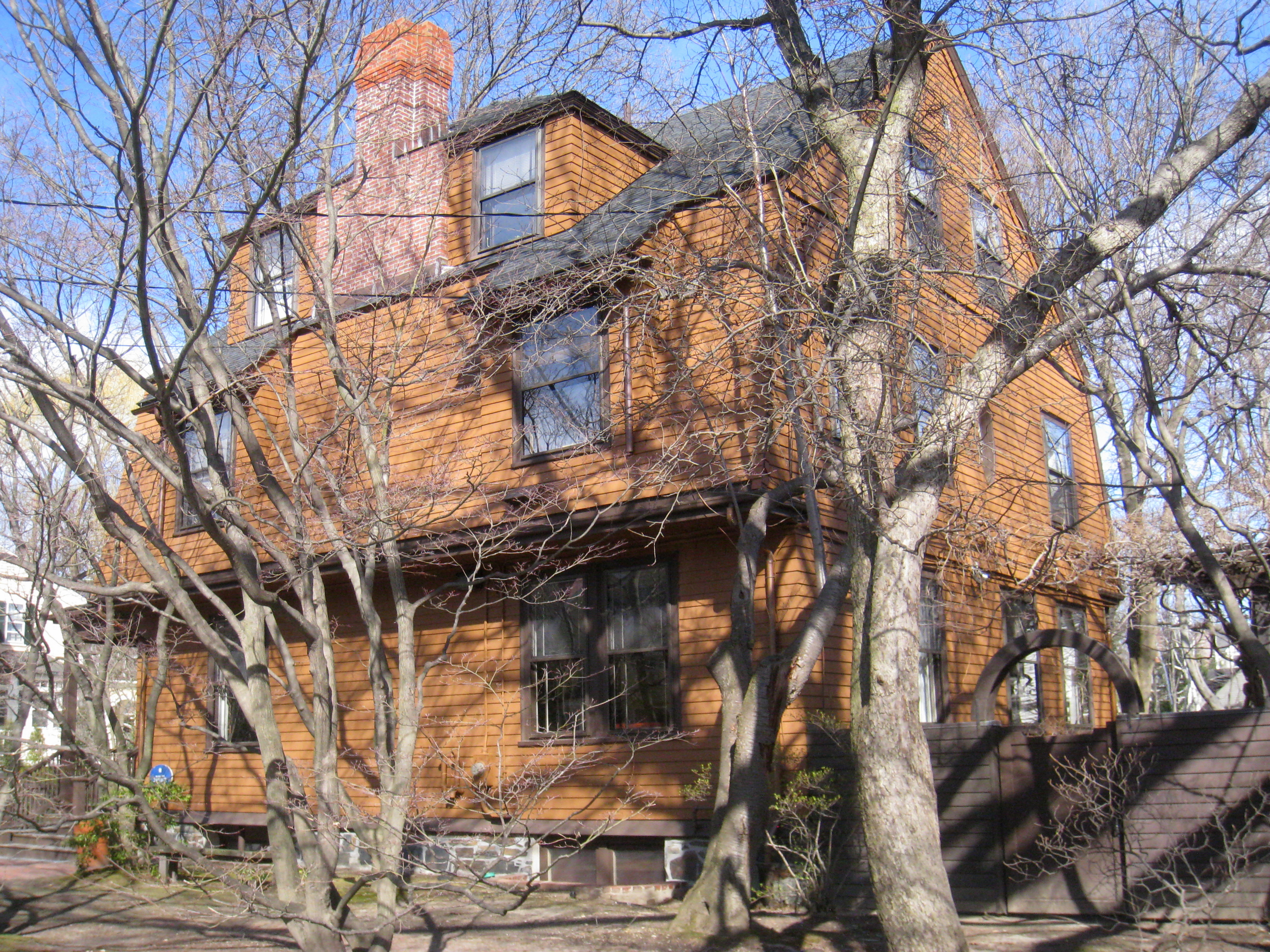

- Location within Massachusetts Location within the United States
- Location: Cambridge, Massachusetts
- Coordinates: 42°22′40.6″N 71°7′59.8″W
- Built: 1887 et seq.
- Built by: James W. McCabe (1887); Abraham Lavash (1907 and 1910); S. A. Jacob (1916); William Donaldson (1935)
- Architect: Cabot & Chandler (1887); Lois Lilley Howe (1907, 1910, 1916 and 1935)
- Architectural style: Shingle style
- MPS: Cambridge MRA
- NRHP reference No.: 83000811
- Added to NRHP: June 30, 1983

The Howe House is an historic house at 6 Appleton Street in Cambridge, Massachusetts. The 2 1/2-story wood-frame house was built in 1887 for Lois Lillie (White) Howe, the mother of Lois Lilley Howe. Howe had the house built following the death of her husband, Dr. Estes Howe. At the time of the house's construction the younger Howe had not yet begun her education at MIT, and it was designed by the noted firm of Cabot & Chandler. After Howe had established herself as an architect she altered the house at least four times, in 1907, 1910 and 1916 and 1935. Architecturally, the house was designed in the Shingle style, but also features elements of the Queen Anne style.

The house is principally significant for its association with Howe, one of the first female graduates of the architectural program at the Massachusetts Institute of Technology, and the first woman made fellow of the American Institute of Architects. Howe initially lived in the house with her mother and sisters. Her mother died in 1911, followed by elder sister Clara Howe in 1923 and half-sister Sarah Lydia Howe in 1929. She then lived alone in the house until 1963, the year before her death.

The house was listed on the National Register of Historic Places in 1983.

== See also ==
- National Register of Historic Places listings in Cambridge, Massachusetts
