= Samuel Cabot III =

American physician and ornithologist (1815–1885)

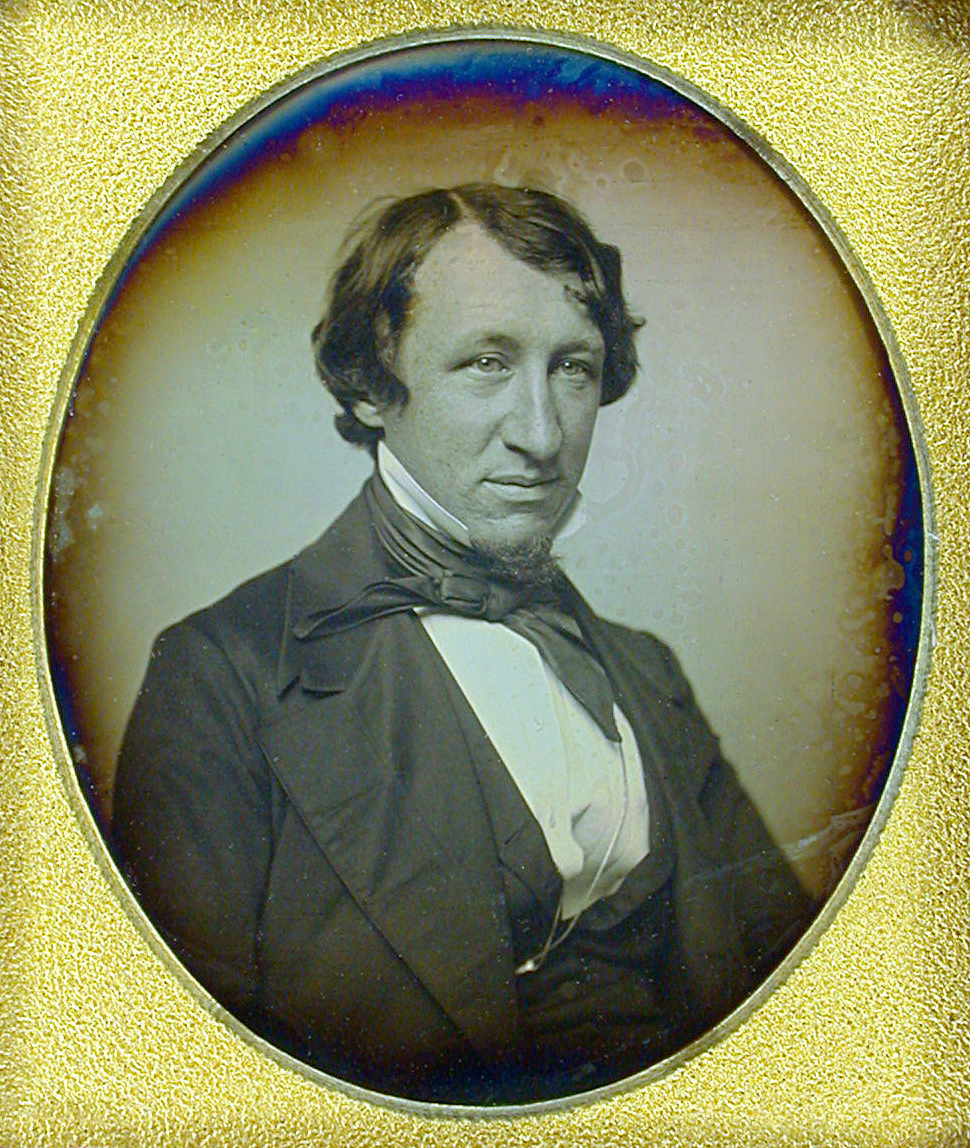
- Born: September 20, 1815; Boston, Massachusetts
- Died: April 13, 1885 (aged 69); Boston, Massachusetts
- Education: Boston Latin School; Harvard University, A.B. (1836); Harvard Medical School, M.D. (1839)
- Occupations: Physician; surgeon; ornithologist
- Children: 9, including Arthur Tracy Cabot, Lilla Cabot Perry, and Godfrey Lowell Cabot
- Father: Samuel Cabot Jr.
- Relatives: Edward Clarke Cabot (brother); James Elliot Cabot (brother); Thomas Handasyd Perkins (grandfather)
- Family: Cabot family

Scientific career
- Eponyms: Tragopan caboti Coereba flaveola caboti
- Described: Cabot's tern (1847)

Samuel Cabot III (September 20, 1815 – April 13, 1885) was an American medical doctor, surgeon, and ornithologist, as well as a member of the wealthy and prominent Cabot family.

== Early life ==
Samuel Cabot III was born in Boston, Massachusetts on September 20, 1815, to Samuel Cabot Jr. and Elizabeth Cabot (née Perkins). His father, Samuel Cabot Jr. and his grandfather, Thomas Handasyd Perkins, were two of the wealthiest men in 19th-century Boston. Among his brothers were the lawyer, philosopher, and author James Elliot Cabot and the architect and artist Edward Clarke Cabot.

Cabot attended Boston Latin School as a child, and received a A.B. from Harvard University in 1836, followed by an M.D. from Harvard Medical School in 1839.

== Medical career ==
After receiving his medical degree, Cabot went to Paris for further studies, returning to Boston in July 1841. In the winter of 1841–1842, he joined John Lloyd Stephens and Frederick Catherwood on their expedition to Yucatán, where he created a sensation in the town of Mérida by performing eye surgery on several inhabitants who were afflicted with strabismus. (Cabot was one of the first doctors in America to perform this operation.) In 1844, he set up his own medical and surgical practice in Boston, which he maintained for the rest of his life. He also served as a visiting surgeon at the Massachusetts General Hospital from 1853 until the time of his death, and pioneered the practice of abdominal surgery there. During the Civil War he volunteered his services as a surgeon for wounded soldiers and an inspector of army hospitals.

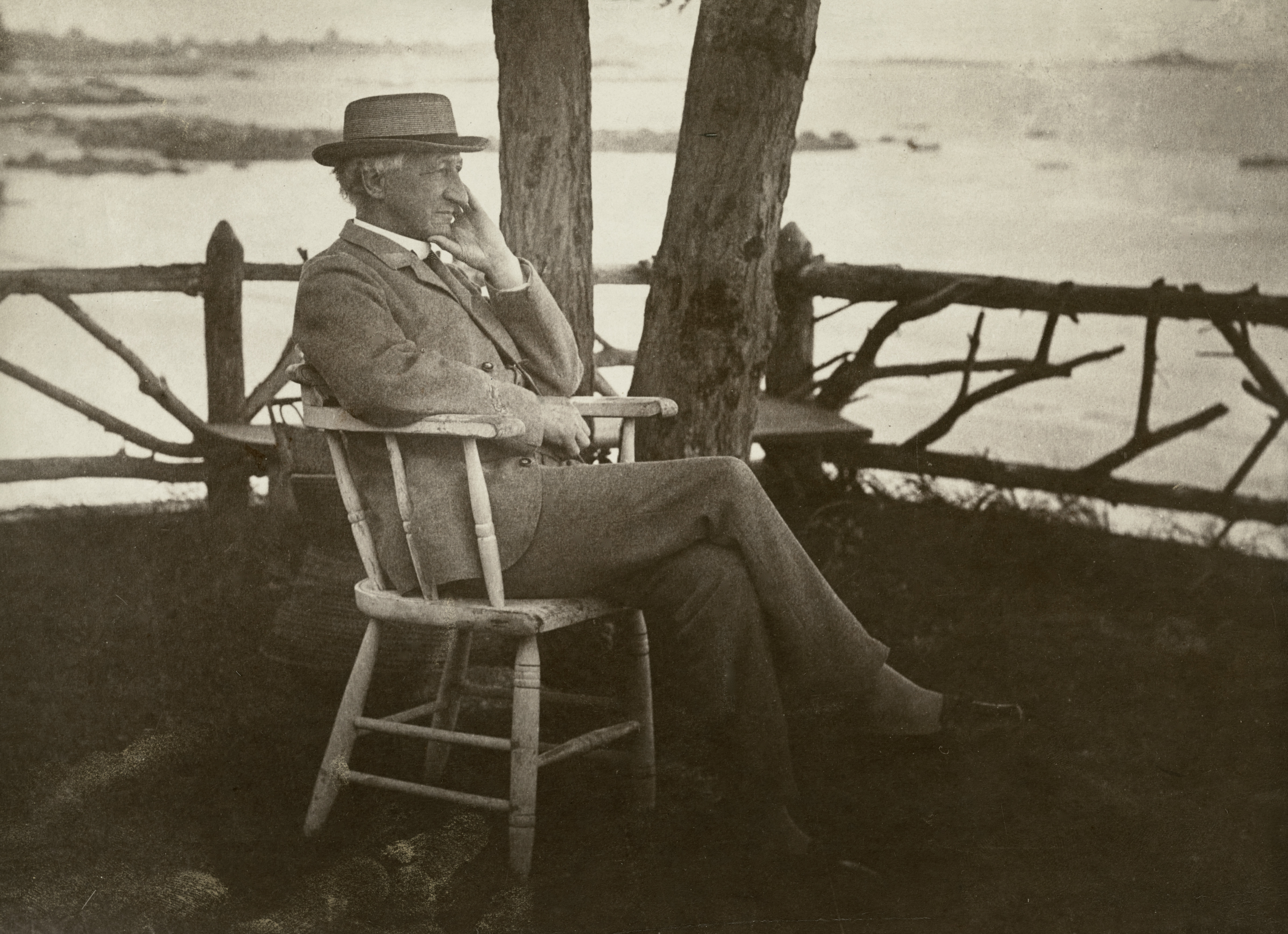
Samuel Cabot, ca. 1875–1885

== Ornithological career ==
Cabot developed an interest in birds and bird collecting at an early age. During his time at Harvard, he could often be found hunting for birds in the woods and rivers of Cambridge and Arlington, along with his brothers James and Edward. While he was in Paris, he urged James to send him as many bird skins as possible, since American birds were in high demand among European collectors and he could trade them for European and Asian species to expand his own collection. He collected a large number of birds in Yucatan during the Stephens expedition in 1841–1842, and over the next decade he published notes and descriptions of many of them, including at least a dozen that were new to science.

In the 1850s the obligations of his medical work forced him to give up publishing on ornithological topics, but he retained a strong interest in the subject until the end of his life. William Brewster praised his "remarkably keen and analytical mind", and believed that, had he continued in the field, "he would, without question, have become one of the most eminent of the ornithologists of his time." After his death in 1885, his collection of birds and eggs was given to the Boston Society of Natural History, where Cabot had for many years been the curator of the avian collection, and in whose proceedings he had published many of his papers. It later passed to the Museum of Comparative Zoology at Harvard, where the type specimens of ten taxa of Yucatan birds first described by Cabot still survive.

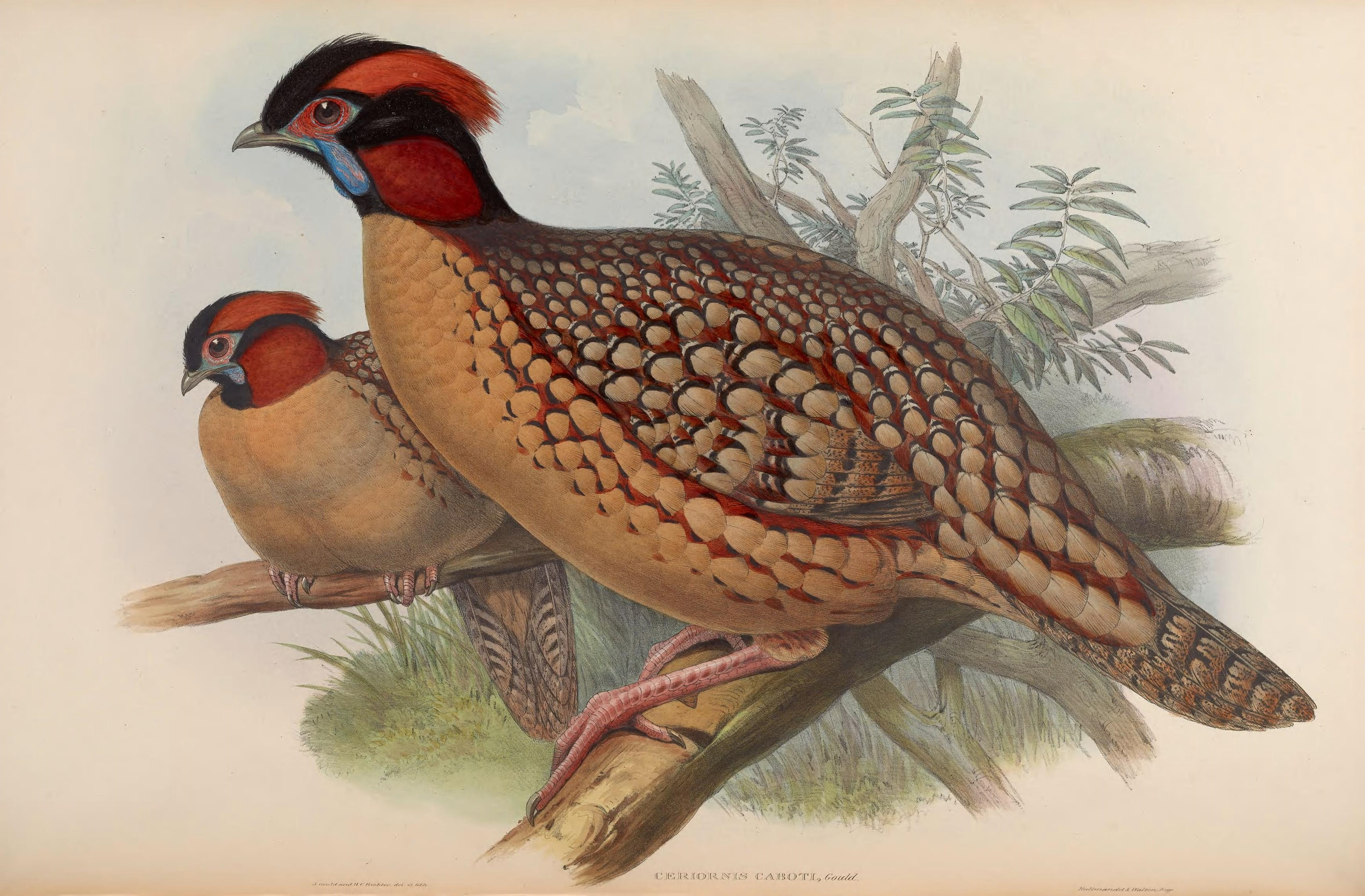
Cabot's tragopan (John Gould, The Birds of Asia)

Three birds were named in Cabot's honor by his contemporaries or later:

- Tragopan caboti (Cabot's tragopan or Chinese tragopan), an Asian pheasant first described in 1857 as Ceriornis caboti by the English ornithologist John Gould, on the basis of a specimen lent to him by Cabot.
- Coereba flaveola caboti (now considered a subspecies of Bananaquit), first described in 1873 as Certhiola caboti by Spencer Baird, on the basis of a specimen collected by Cabot on Cozumel island, off the coast of Yucatan.
- Colinus nigrogularis caboti (a subspecies of the Yucatan bobwhite), named after Cabot in 1941 from studies he made of it a century earlier in the Yucatán Peninsula.

In addition, a tern collected in Yucatán and first described by Cabot in 1847 as Sterna acuflavida is known in English as Cabot's tern. As of 2022, it is considered a full species (Thalasseus acuflavidus) by the International Ornithological Congress, although some other authorities treat it as a subspecies of the Sandwich tern (Thalasseus sandvicensis acuflavidus).

== Personal life ==
Cabot was an abolitionist who served as secretary for the New England Emigrant Aid Company, which worked to stop the spread of slavery by sending anti-slavery settlers to the Kansas Territory in the wake of the Kansas–Nebraska Act of 1854. Among his other philanthropic and charitable works were volunteer services to the Massachusetts Infant Asylum and the Home for Destitute Catholic Children in Boston.

In 1844, Cabot married Hannah Lowell Jackson (1820–1879). Together, they had nine children (one of whom died in infancy), including artist Lilla Cabot Perry (born 1848), chemist Samuel Cabot IV (born 1850), surgeon Arthur Tracy Cabot (born 1852), and industrialist Godfrey Lowell Cabot (born 1861).
