= Cabot rings =

Red blood cell abnormality

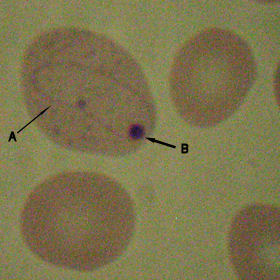
A – Cabot ring B – Howell-Jolly body

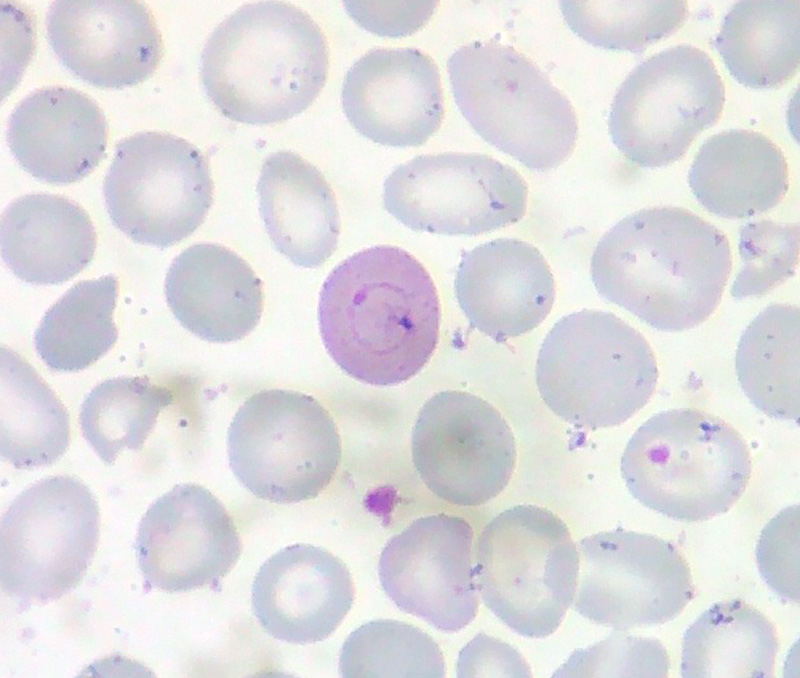
Cabot ring

Cabot rings are thin, red-violet staining, threadlike strands in the shape of a loop or figure-8 that are found on rare occasions in red blood cells (erythrocytes). They are believed to be microtubules that are remnants from a mitotic spindle, and their presence indicates an abnormality in the production of red blood cells. Cabot Rings, considerably rare findings, when present are found in the cytoplasm of red blood cells and in most cases, are caused by defects of erythrocytic production and are not commonly found in the blood circulating throughout the body.

== Cytologic appearance ==
Cabot rings appear as ring, figure-8 or loop-shaped structures on microscopy. Cabot rings stain red or purple with Wright's stain.

== Associated conditions ==
Cabot rings have been observed in a handful of cases in patients with pernicious anemia, lead poisoning, certain other disorders of red blood cell production (erythropoiesis).

== History ==
They were first described in 1903 by American physician Richard Clarke Cabot (1868–1939).

== Media ==
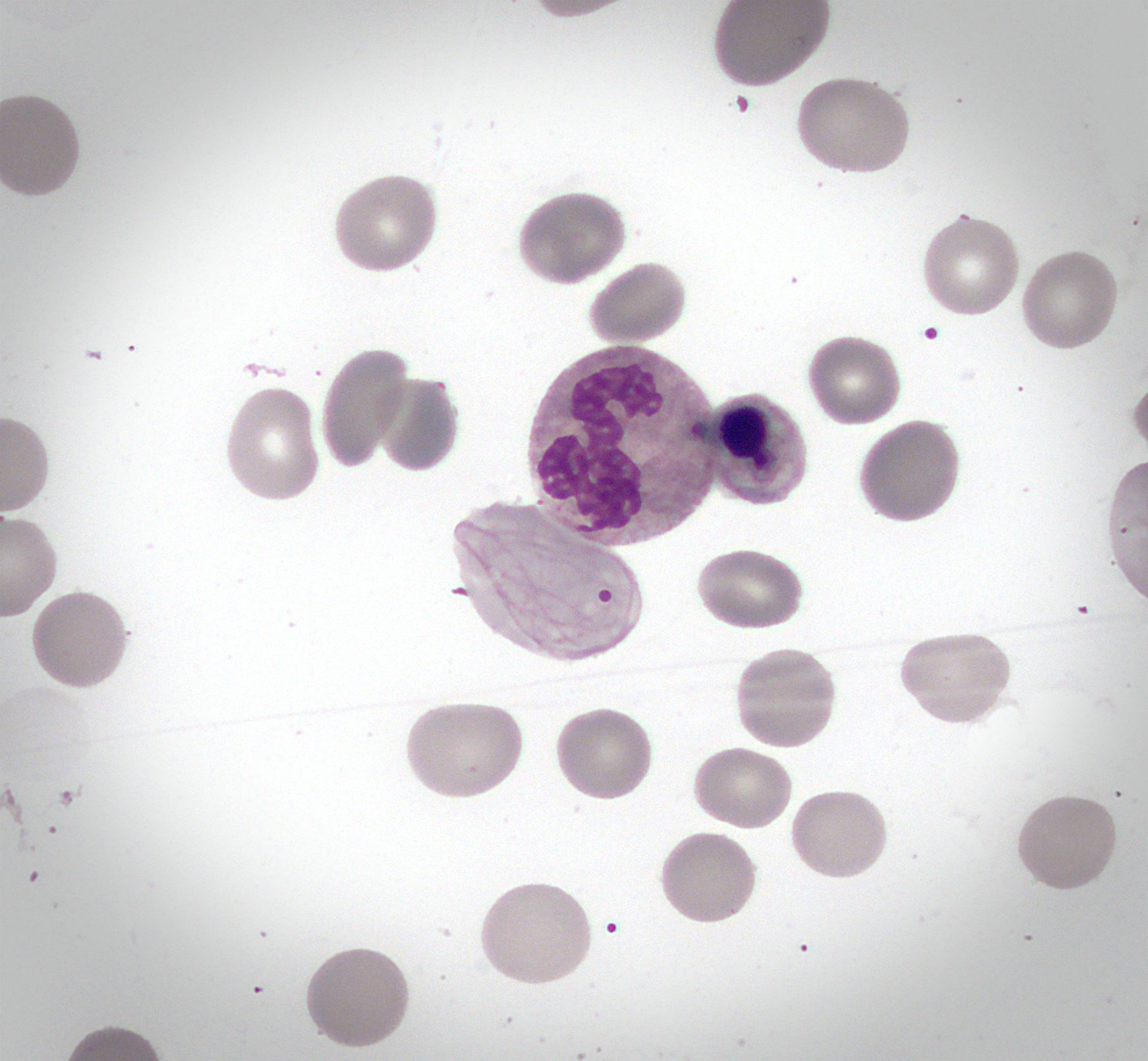
Cabot rings inside atypical erythrocyte. May-Grunwald staining (x400)

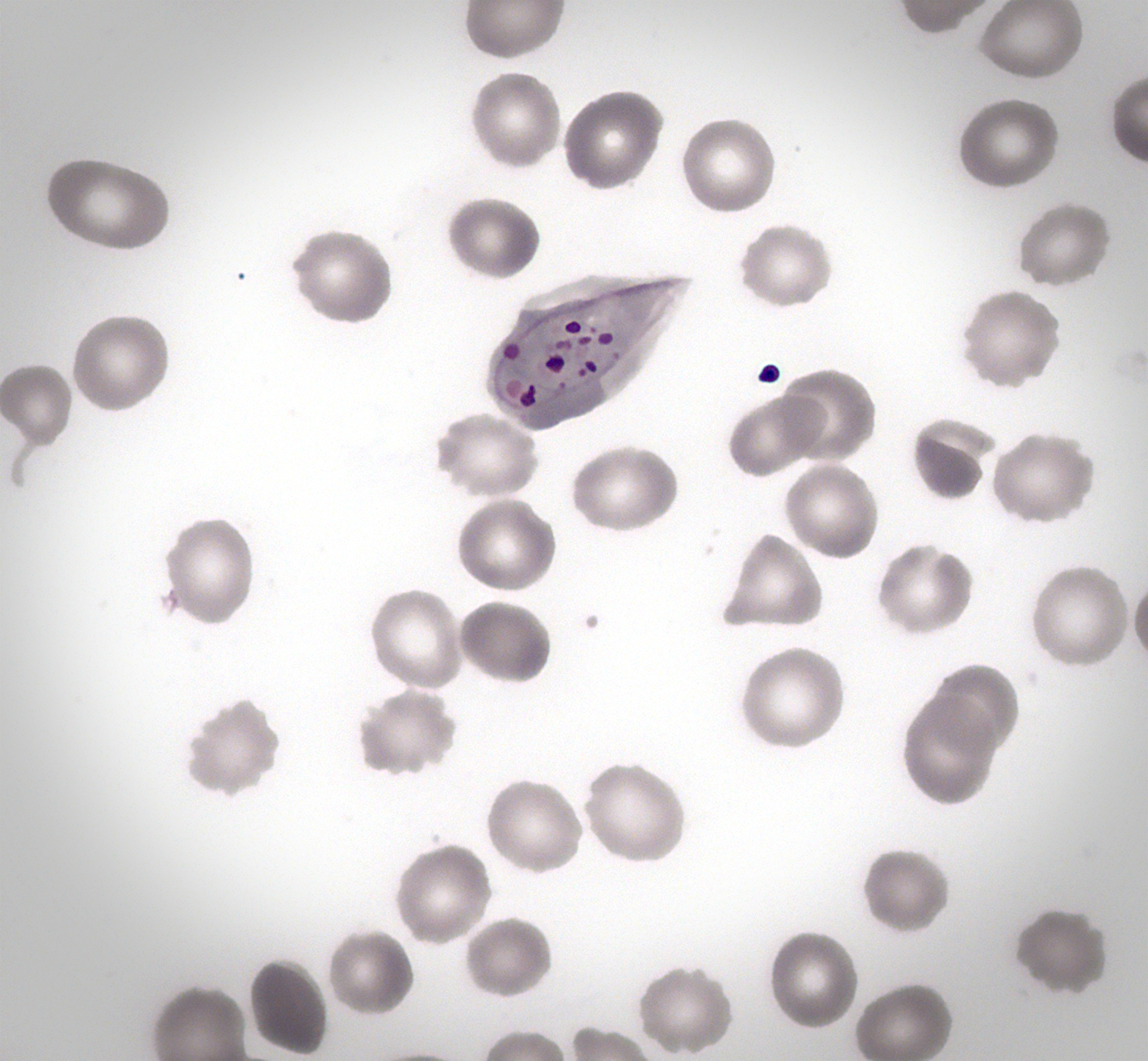
Nucleated red blood cell with Cabot rings and basophilic granules. May-Grunwald staining (x400)
