= Gibson House Museum =

Historic house in Boston, Massachusetts

- Gibson House
- U.S. National Register of Historic Places
- U.S. National Historic Landmark
- U.S. Historic district – Contributing property
- Boston Landmark
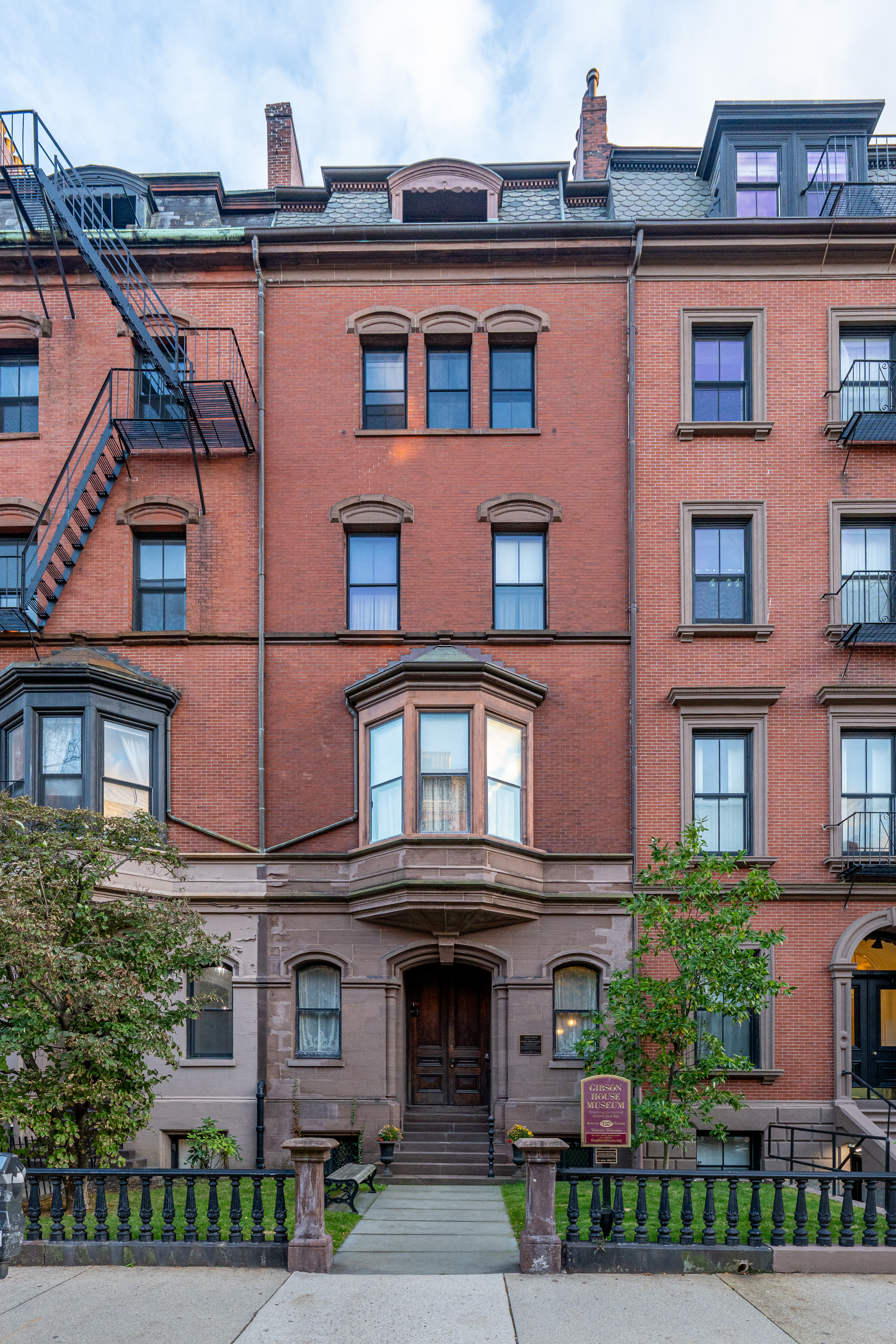
- Front of the Gibson House Museum on Beacon Street (2025)

- Location within Boston Location within Massachusetts Location within the United States
- Location: Boston, Massachusetts
- Coordinates: 42°21′17.4″N 71°4′26.9″W
- Built: 1859–60
- Part of: Back Bay Historic District (ID73001948)
- NRHP reference No.: 01001048

Significant dates
- Added to NRHP: August 7, 2001
- Designated NHL: August 7, 2001
- Designated CP: August 14, 1973
- Designated BOSL: July 28, 1992

The Gibson House Museum is a historic house museum located at 137 Beacon Street in the Back Bay neighborhood of Boston, Massachusetts. It preserves the 1860 Victorian rowhouse occupied by three generations of the Gibson family. The house was one of the first to be built in Back Bay, and has an unparalleled state of preservation that includes wallpaper, textiles, furnishings, and family artifacts and collections. Both the public and service areas of the house exhibit a high degree of preservation, and are viewable on tours. The property was designated a Boston Landmark in 1992 by the Boston Landmarks Commission and a National Historic Landmark in 2001.

== History ==
The widowed Catherine Hammond Gibson purchased the newly filled in land for $3,696 in 1859 in order to move away from Beacon Hill. Edward Clarke Cabot designed the building which was finished by 1860 in the Italian Renaissance style with an exterior of brownstone and red brick. She passed it on to her son Charles Hammond Gibson.

Charles married Rosamond Warren in 1871 and brought her to live at number 137. Rosamond was from a very distinguished Boston family and after Catherine's death in 1888 redecorated the house with Japanese wallpapers.

After Charles Hammond Gibson Jr., Catherine Hammond Gibson's grandson, died in 1954, the house became a museum in 1957, and in 2001 was declared a National Historic Landmark. The Gibson House's landmark status is due to its claim that it is the only Victorian era row house in Boston's Back Bay to maintain the integral relationship between the exterior architectural shell and the original interior plan, with its accompanying decorative schemes. Its interior is a composite of family furnishings and pieces added to make it more complete.

== Museum ==
The museum hosts public tours and programming including lectures and receptions.

In 2013, Simple Machine Theatre staged a production of The Turn of the Screw on the museum's Grand Staircase and front hall before an audience seated in the entrance.

To commemorate Charles Hammond Gibson Jr.'s reputation as a Prohibition-era party host, the museum hosts an annual Repeal Day Celebration fundraiser, featuring period cocktails.^{I n}

== In film ==
The 1984 Merchant/Ivory film The Bostonians contains scenes filmed in Rosamund Warren Gibson's bedroom, in the red study, and on the landing at the top of the grand staircase.

A 2018 promotional film for Boston Ballet's production of The Nutcracker features scenes of Clara in the museum's Music Room and on the Grand Staircase.

In 2018 director Greta Gerwig filmed scenes in the museum for Little Women. The museum served as the boarding house residence of Jo March, while the museum library was depicted as the office of Jo March's publisher.

== See also ==
- List of National Historic Landmarks in Massachusetts
- National Register of Historic Places listings in northern Boston, Massachusetts
