= Ella Lyman Cabot =

American philosopher (1866–1934)

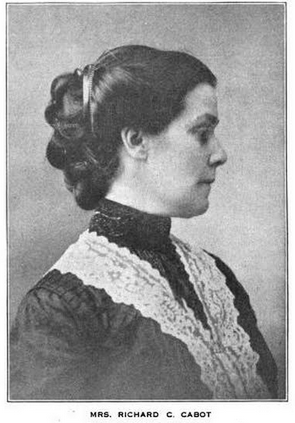
- Ella Lyman Cabot, from a 1909 publication.
- Born: Ella Lyman; February 26, 1866; Boston, Massachusetts, U.S.
- Died: September 20, 1934 (aged 68); Boston, Massachusetts, U.S.
- Occupations: Educator, lecturer, writer
- Spouse: Richard Clarke Cabot (m. 1894)

Education
- Education: Radcliffe College; Harvard College

Philosophical work
- Era: 19th-century philosophy; 20th-century philosophy
- Region: Western philosophy
- Main interests: Ethics

Ella Lyman Cabot (née Lyman; February 26, 1866 – September 20, 1934) was an American philosopher of ethics for children, who worked as an educator, lecturer and writer. She was born into a prominent Unitarian family in Boston and was the fourth of seven children. Her parents, Ella (Lowell) Lyman and Arthur Theodore Lyman, owned a family estate in Waltham, Massachusetts.

== Education ==
Cabot was educated in Boston private schools and attended Radcliffe College as a special student from 1889 to 1891 and took graduate courses at Harvard College from 1897 to 1903.

== Career ==
In 1897, Cabot began her career as an educator of ethics and applied psychology. She taught at Boston private schools and at Pine Manor Junior College in Wellesley, Massachusetts as well as directed Sunday school at King's Chapel.

Cabot served on the governing boards of Radcliffe College from 1902 to 1934, and on the Massachusetts Board of Education from 1905 to 1934. Among the numerous other organizations in which she held office were the Women's Education Association of Massachusetts, the Unitarian Sunday School Association, the Unitarian Temperance Society, and the National Religious Education Association.

Cabot also published seven books on ethics and childhood education between 1906 and 1929, a privately printed three-volume biography of her parents, and many articles and pamphlets.

== Family and personal life ==
On October 26, 1894, she married Dr. Richard Clarke Cabot (1868–1939), physician and professor of medicine and social ethics at Harvard. The Cabots made their home first on Marlborough St. in Boston and then on Brattle Street in Cambridge. They also spent time in Cohasset, Massachusetts, and at the Cabot family house in North East Harbor, Maine, and camped on Spruce Island, Saranac, New York, during many summers. They decided to not have children.

Richard Clarke Cabot and Ella Lyman Cabot were both prolific letter-writers. Their lifelong correspondence, from the beginning of their courtship in 1888 through the year of Cabot's death, documents her ambivalent feelings about leaving her own family to accept Richard's proposal of marriage, and their initial disagreement about having children. The letters also clearly show their nearly fifty years of shared religious and philosophical inspiration, and their emotional reliance upon each other. During the last 15 years of Cabot's life the correspondence consists largely of birthday and Christmas letters.

Cabot's correspondence with friends attests to the intimate and supportive relationships she had with some women, notably Ada Pierce McCormick, a Radcliffe classmate and god-daughter of Richard who remained a close friend for more than 30 years, and Cabot's cousin Mary Pratt Sears, a lifelong friend with whom Cabot corresponded from the age of 13. This portion of Series III also contains letters, some to both Cabot and Richard, from a wide variety of friends and acquaintances; some are personal, and others are about charitable donations, lecture invitations, and board meetings.

She died from lung cancer in the fall of 1934.
