= Samuel Cabot Jr. =

American businessman (1784–1863)

- Born: December 21, 1784; Boston, Massachusetts
- Died: September 2, 1863 (aged 78)
- Occupation: Merchant
- Years active: 1806-1838
- Spouse: Eliza Perkins
- Children: 7, including Samuel III, Edward, and James
- Parent(s): Samuel Cabot; Sally Barrett Cabot
- Relatives: See Cabot family

Samuel Cabot Jr. (December 21, 1784 – September 2, 1863) was an American businessman in the early-nineteenth-century China Trade, a member of the wealthy and prominent Cabot family.

== Early life ==
Cabot was born in Boston, Massachusetts on December 21, 1784 into the Cabot family. He was the eldest son of Sarah "Sally" (née Barrett) Cabot (1763–1809) and Samuel Cabot (1759–1819), a successful ship merchant. Among his many siblings were Mary Clarke Cabot, Eliza Lee (née Cabot) Follen (wife of Charles Follen), Joseph Cabot, Sarah (née Cabot) Parkman, Susan Copley Cabot, Richard Clarke Cabot, Edward Cabot, and Mary Ann (née Cabot) Cabot.

== Career ==
In 1806, after a couple of years familiarizing himself with the East Indies trade, he set up business in Philadelphia, in partnership with Samuel Hazard.

After marrying Eliza, Samuel then went into business with his brother Joseph and with John W. Perit, taking charge of the Philadelphia-based partnership's Boston office.

He entered the China Trade in 1817, in yet another family partnership, with his Perkins in-laws. He retired from business in 1838, one of the richest merchants in New England.

== Personal life ==
In 1808, he returned to Boston and married Elizabeth "Eliza" Perkins (1791–1885), a daughter of Thomas Handasyd Perkins. Together, they lived in Brookline, Massachusetts and were the parents of seven sons, including:

- Thomas Handasyd Cabot (1814–1835), who caught smallpox and died in China.
- Samuel Cabot III (1815–1885), a surgeon and ornithologist who married Hannah Lowell Jackson.
- Edward Clarke Cabot (1818–1901), an architect and artist who married Martha Eunice Robinson Cabot in 1842. After her death in 1871, he married Louisa Sewall in 1873.
- James Elliot Cabot (1821–1903), who became a philosopher and author who married Elizabeth Dwight in 1857.
- Stephen Cabot (1826–1906)
- Walter Channing Cabot (1829–1904), who married Elizabeth Rogers Mason in 1860.
- Louis Cabot (1837–1914), who trained as an architect under his older brother before becoming a soldier in the Civil War and marrying Amy Hemenway.

Cabot died on September 11, 1863.
