= James Elliot Cabot =

American philosopher and author (1821–1903)

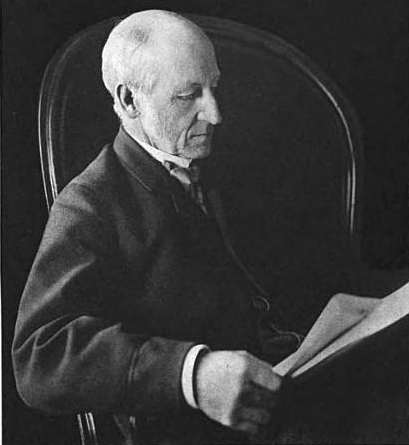
- Born: June 18, 1821; Boston, Massachusetts
- Died: January 16, 1903 (aged 81); Brookline, Massachusetts
- Education: Harvard Law School
- Occupations: Philosopher, author
- Spouse: Elizabeth Dwight (m. 1857–1901)
- Children: 7, including Richard and Hugh
- Father: Samuel Cabot Jr.
- Family: Cabot family

James Elliot Cabot (June 18, 1821 – January 16, 1903) was an American philosopher and author, born in Boston to Samuel Cabot Jr., and Eliza Cabot.

== Education and career ==
Having received his bachelor's degree from Harvard Law School in 1845, Elliot started a law firm.

He taught philosophy at Harvard and was a transcendentalist and edited the Massachusetts Quarterly Review, beginning in 1848. Cabot was a correspondent of Henry David Thoreau.

== Views and publications ==
Cabot argued that we do not experience space directly, that space is "a system of relations, it cannot be given in any one sensation. [...] Space is a symbol of the general relatedness of objects constructed by thought from data which lie below consciousness." Cabot was of the opinion that the position of something in space was not felt at all, but deduced from perceived relations.

His 2-volume biography of Ralph Waldo Emerson was criticized for its lack of color. According to the review in The Saturday Review of Politics, Literature, Science, and Art, Cabot "gives abundant materials for forming, correcting, or filling up an idea of Emerson's character, but comparatively little information about the events of a life which appears, indeed, to have been very uneventful."

== Family ==
On September 27, 1857, Cabot married Elizabeth Dwight, daughter of Edmund Dwight. They had seven sons:

- Francis Elliot Cabot (1859–1939), a member of the Boston Board of Fire Underwriters from 1883 to 1926.
- Edward Twistleton Cabot (1861–1893), captain of the 1882 Harvard Crimson football team and an attorney.
- Thomas Handasyde Cabot (1864–1938), a merchant.
- Charles Mills Cabot (1866–1915) founder of the investment firm Moors & Cabot. Father of actor Elliot Cabot.
- Richard Clarke Cabot (1868–1939), a physician who advanced clinical hematology, was an innovator in teaching methods, and a pioneer in social work.
- Philip Cabot (1872–1941), a professor of business administration at the Harvard Business School, public utility expert, and vestryman at King's Chapel.
- Hugh Cabot (1872–1945), surgeon and educator who was dean of the University of Michigan Medical School and a member of the staff at the Mayo Clinic. He was a specialist in genitourinary surgery and an advocate of group medical practice.

Elizabeth Cabot died in 1901. He died in Brookline Massachusetts in 1903.
