= Jonathan Mason (politician) =

American politician (1756–1831)

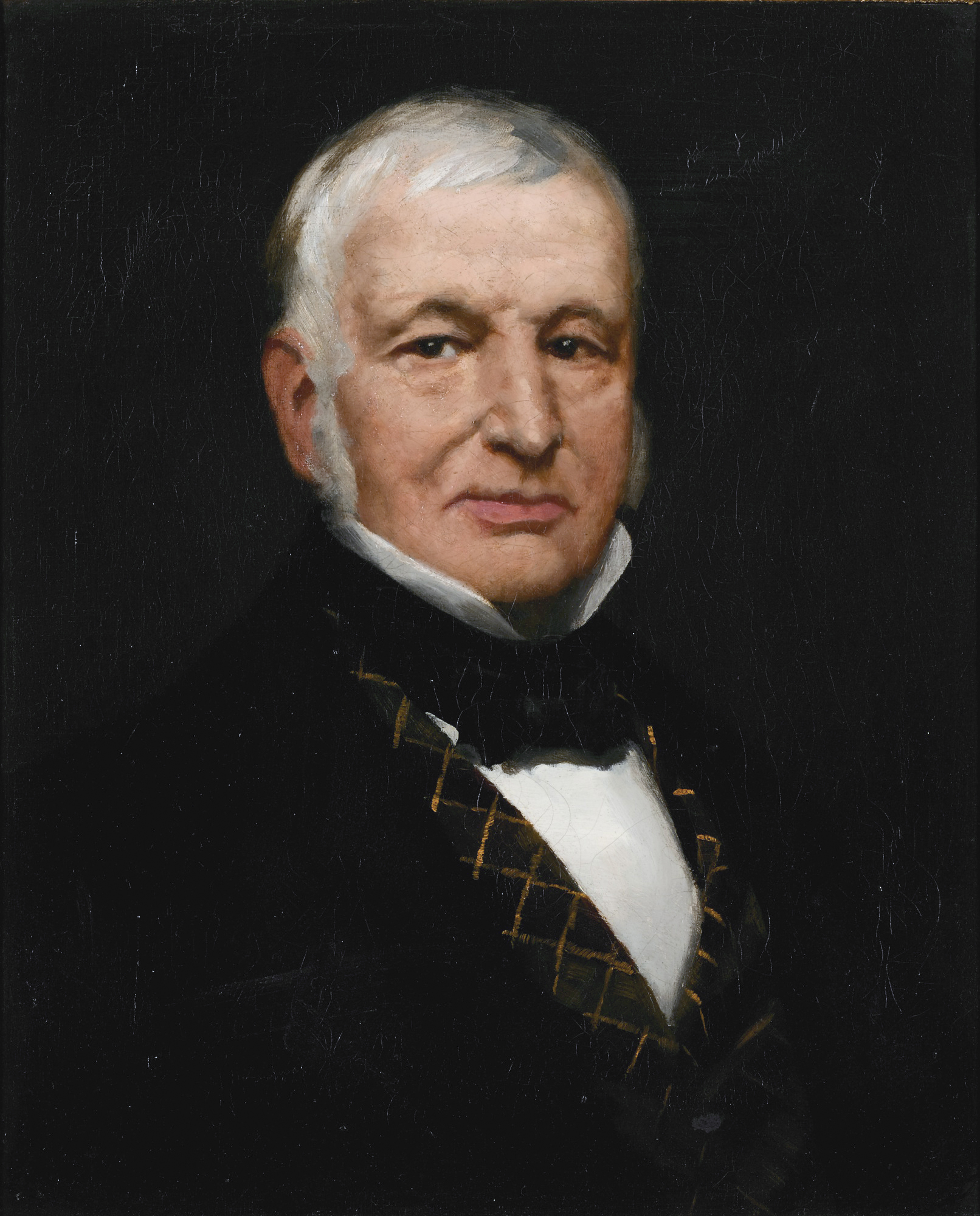
- Portrait of Mason, c. 1805

United States Senator from Massachusetts
- In office November 14, 1800 – March 3, 1803
- Preceded by: Benjamin Goodhue
- Succeeded by: John Quincy Adams

Member of the U.S. House of Representatives from Massachusetts's 1st district
- In office March 4, 1817 – May 15, 1820
- Preceded by: Artemas Ward Jr.
- Succeeded by: Benjamin Gorham

Member of the Massachusetts Senate
- In office 1799–1800

Member of the Massachusetts House of Representatives
- In office 1786–1796

Personal details
- Born: September 12, 1756 Boston, Province of Massachusetts Bay, British America
- Died: November 1, 1831 (aged 75) Boston, Massachusetts, U.S.
- Party: Federalist
- Education: College of New Jersey
- Profession: Law

Jonathan Mason (September 12, 1756 – November 1, 1831) was a Federalist United States Senator and Representative from Massachusetts during the early years of the United States.

== Early life ==
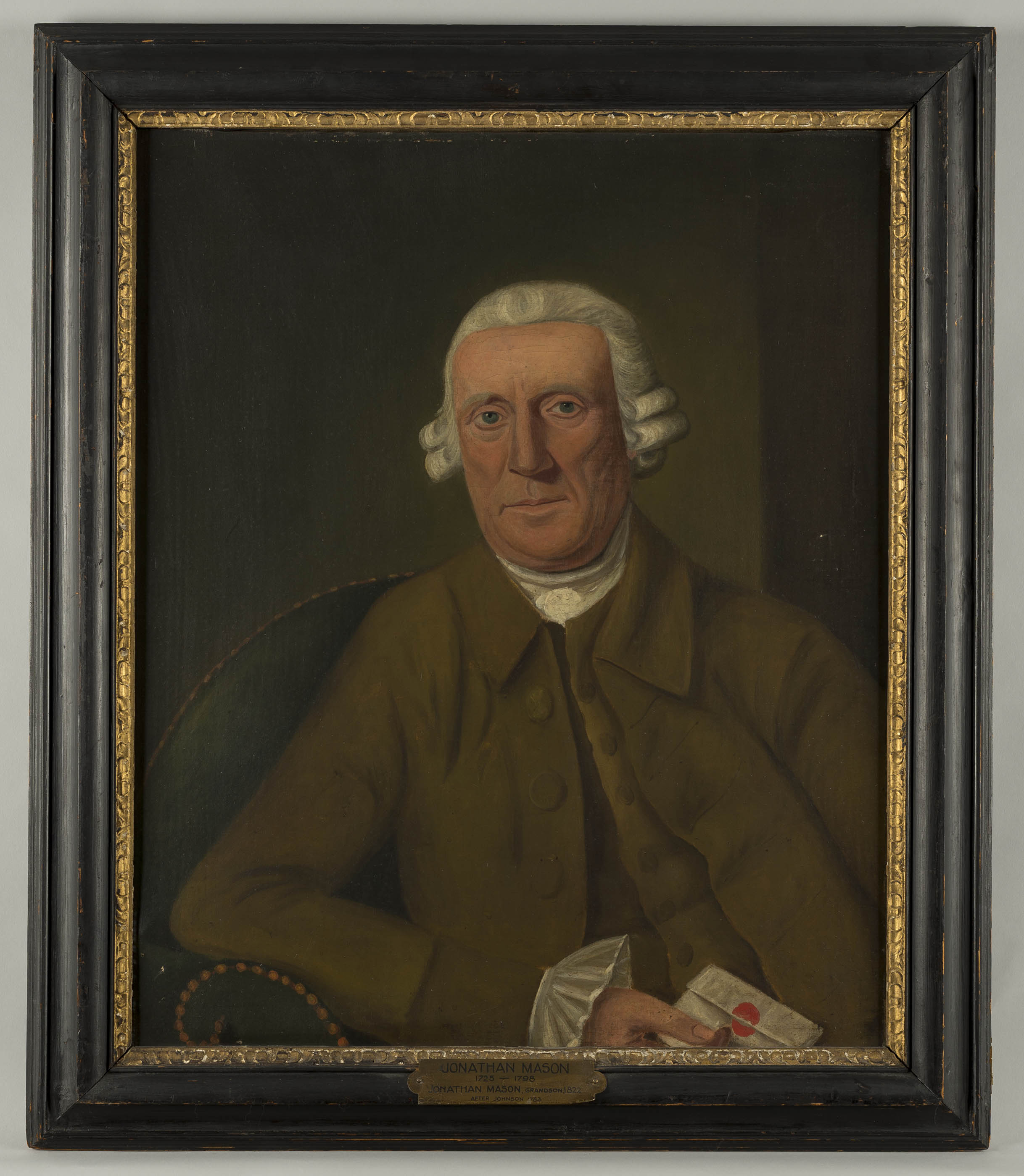
Portrait of his father, Jonathan Mason, painted by the Senator's son, Jonathan Mason, in 1822, after the original by John Johnston

Mason was born in Boston in the Province of Massachusetts Bay on September 12, 1756. He was a son of Jonathan Mason (1725–1798) and Miriam (née Clarke) Mason (1724–1794).

He attended Boston Latin School the College of New Jersey (now Princeton University), graduating in 1774. After studying law, he was admitted to the bar in 1779.

== Career ==
In 1780, Mason delivered the annual address marking the Boston Massacre.

Starting in 1795, Mason was a partner in the Mount Vernon Proprietors, a developer of real estate in Boston's Beacon Hill neighborhood. Around 1800 he built a mansion for himself on Mt. Vernon Street, in which he lived through the end of his life. Around 1804 he hired architect Charles Bulfinch to design 4 houses, also on Mt. Vernon Street, for each of his daughters; the 4 houses still stand today.

Mason was also a member of the South Boston Association, which developed real estate in Dorchester.

=== Political career ===
He was a Member of the Massachusetts House of Representatives from 1786 to 1796.

From 1797 to 1798, he served with the Massachusetts Governor's Council and was elected for the following two years, and was in the Massachusetts Senate from 1799 to 1800. Following the resignation of Senator Benjamin Goodhue, he was elected to the U.S. Senate, where he served from November 14, 1800, to March 3, 1803. He then resumed his law practice and served again in the Massachusetts Senate from 1803 to 1804 and the Massachusetts House from 1805 to 1808.

He served again in the U.S. House of Representatives from March 4, 1817, to May 15, 1820, whereupon he resigned to pursue his law practice.

== Personal life ==
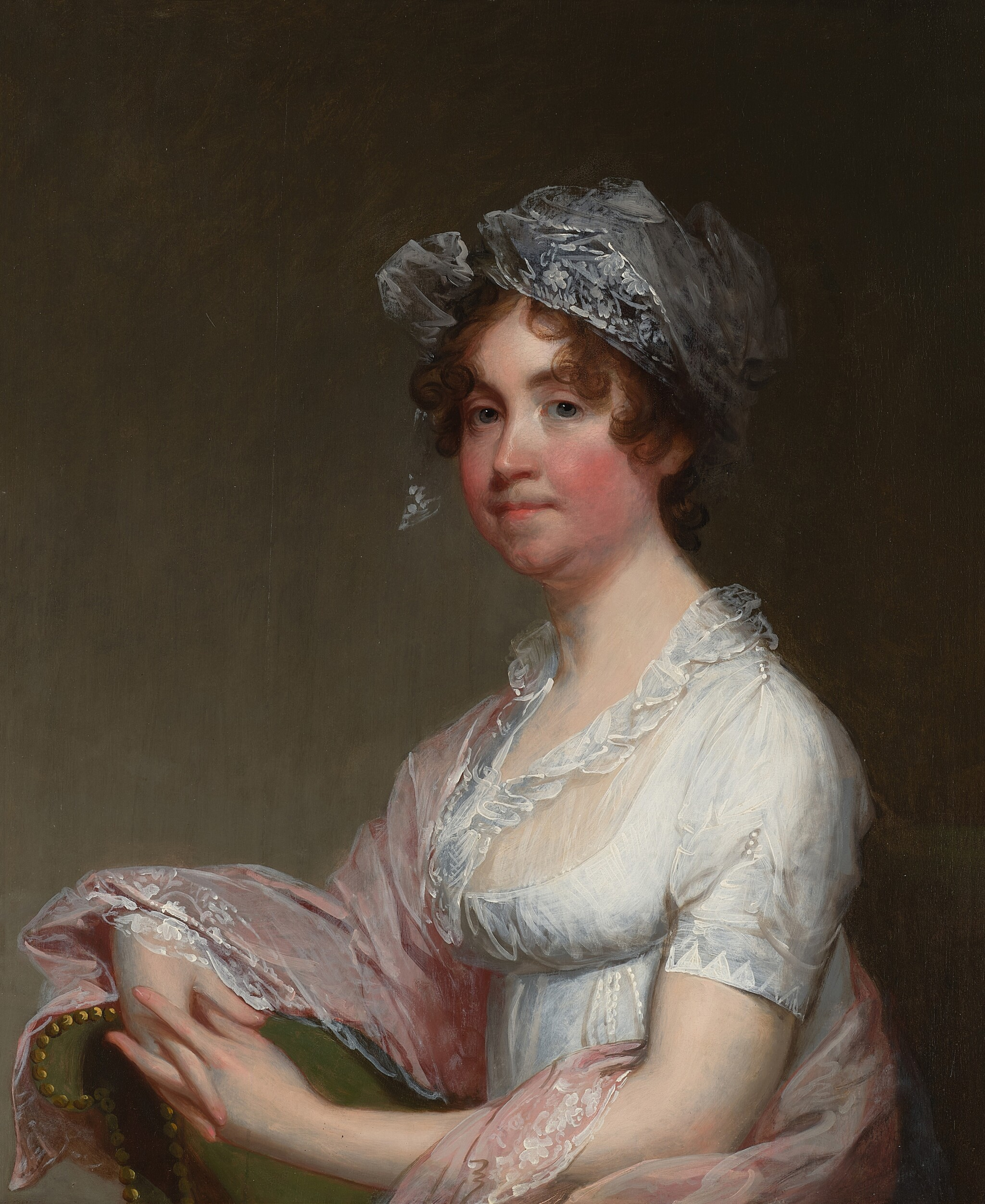
Portrait of Mrs. Jonathan Mason by Gilbert Stuart, 1805

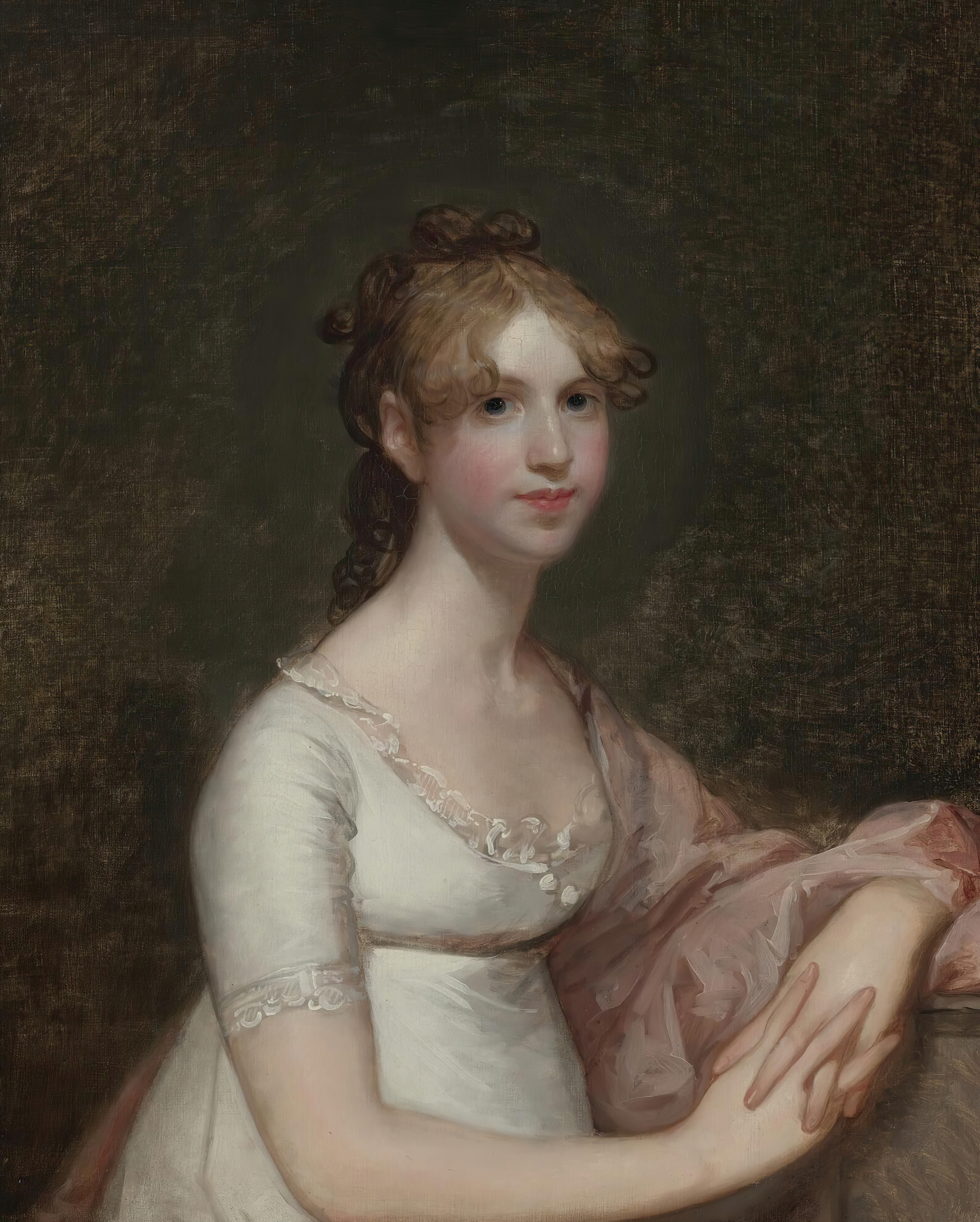
Portrait of his daughter, Anna, by Gilbert Stuart, 1804

On April 13, 1779, Mason married Susannah Powell (1760–1836). Together, they were the parents of five daughters and two sons:

- Susan Powell Mason (1783–1841), who married Dr. John Collins Warren, son of Dr. John Warren, founder of Harvard Medical School.
- Elizabeth Mason (1784–1826), who married attorney Samuel Dunn Parker, son of Samuel Parker, Bishop of Massachusetts.
- Anna Powell Mason (1789–1861), who married Scottish widower Patrick Grant in 1807.
- Miriam Clarke Mason (1790–1861), who married businessman David Sears.
- William Powell Mason (1791–1867), who married Hannah Rogers, a descendant of Harvard president John Rogers and of Thomas Dudley, governor of the Massachusetts Bay Colony.
- Mary Bromfield Mason (1793–1874), who married Samuel Henry Parkman.
- Jonathan Mason (1795–1884), who married Isabella Weyman.

Between 1804 and 1805, Gilbert Stuart painted his portrait and that of his wife Susannah and daughter Anna.

Mason died in Boston, at age 75. He is interred in Mount Auburn Cemetery in Cambridge, Massachusetts.

=== Descendants ===
Through his son William he was a grandfather of Elizabeth Rogers Mason Cabot, the wife of Walter Channing Cabot (son of Samuel Cabot Jr.). Elizabeth was involved in running the Home for Aged Colored Women in Boston, as well as the Children's Aid Society and the Woman's Education Association.

U.S. Senate
Preceded by Benjamin Goodhue	U.S. senator (Class 1) from Massachusetts; 1800 – 1803; Served alongside: Dwight Foster	Succeeded by John Quincy Adams
U.S. House of Representatives
Preceded by Artemas Ward, Jr.	Member of the U.S. House of Representatives from Massachusetts's 1st congressional district March 4, 1817 – May 15, 1820	Succeeded by Benjamin Gorham
