= Walnut Hills Cemetery (Brookline, Massachusetts) =

Historic cemetery in Massachusetts, United States

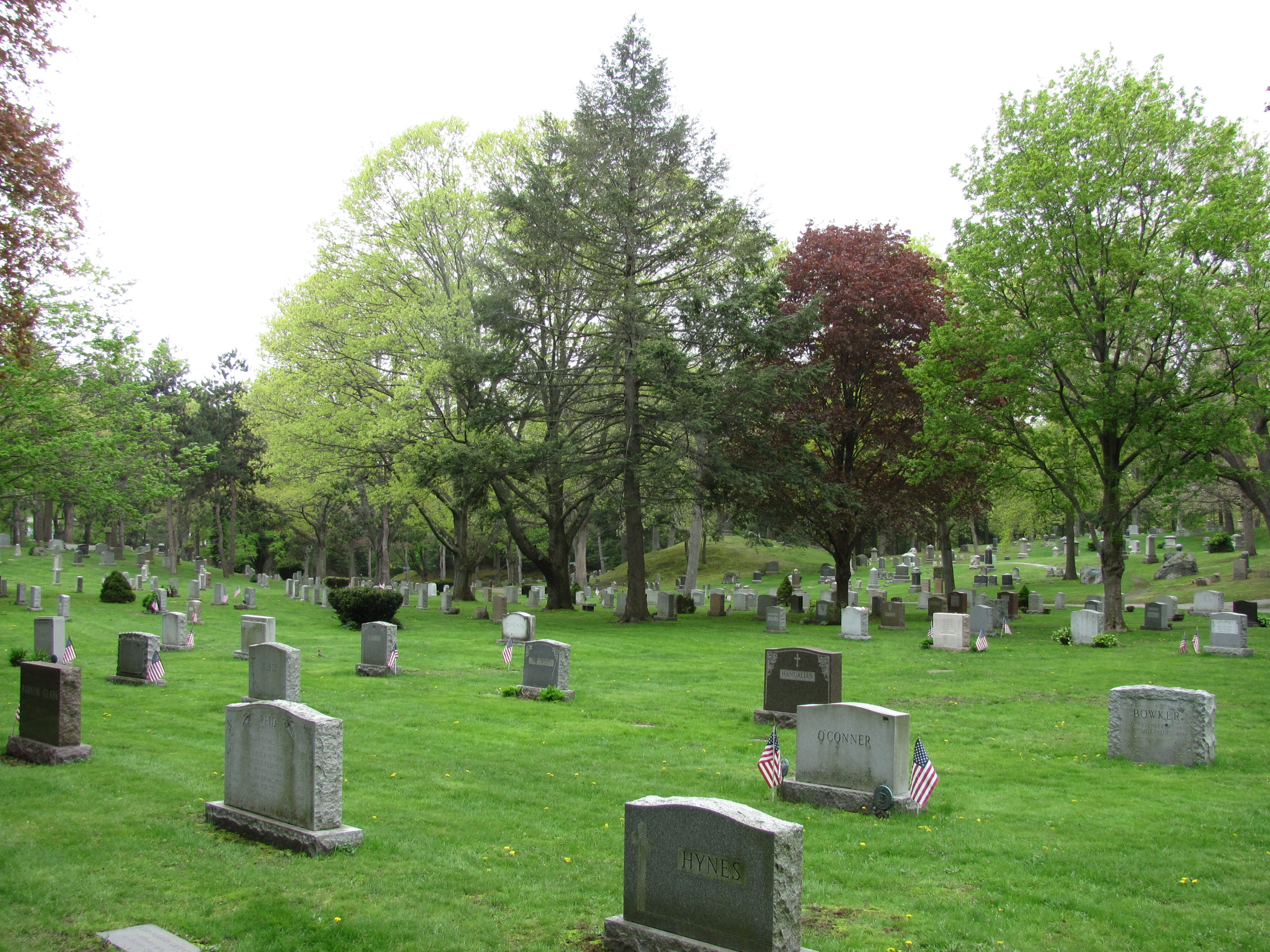
- Walnut Hills Cemetery
- Interactive map of Walnut Hills Cemetery

Details
- Established: 1875
- Location: 96 Grove Street; Chestnut Hill, Brookline, Massachusetts
- Country: United States
- Type: Rural cemetery
- Size: 45.26 acres (18.32 ha)
- Find a Grave: Walnut Hills Cemetery
- Walnut Hills Cemetery
- U.S. National Register of Historic Places
- Location within Massachusetts Location within the United States
- Location: Grove St. and Allandale Rd., Brookline, Massachusetts
- Coordinates: 42°18′10″N 71°8′50″W
- Architect: Ernest Bowditch
- MPS: Brookline MRA
- NRHP reference No.: 85003241
- Added to NRHP: October 17, 1985

Walnut Hills Cemetery is a historic cemetery on Grove Street and Allandale Road in Brookline, Massachusetts. It encompasses 45.26 acres (18.32 ha), with mature trees and puddingstone outcrops, and was laid out in 1875 in the then-fashionable rural cemetery style. Many past prominent citizens of the town, including architect H. H. Richardson, are buried here. The cemetery was listed on the National Register of Historic Places in 1985.

== Description and history ==
Walnut Hills Cemetery is located in southern Brookline, south of the junction of Grove Street and Allandale Road. Its main entrance is at that junction, with a secondary entrance a short way to the west on Grove Street. It is flanked on the south and west sides by residential areas. Covering about 45 acres (18 ha), the cemetery is characterized by rolling hills, with occasional steep slopes, and mature plantings. Paved and unpaved roads and paths wind through the cemetery, following the contours of the terrain.

The cemetery's built features include its receiving tomb, built in 1901 to a design by Alexander Wadsworth Longfellow Jr. The cluster of utility buildings, including a stable and shed, were designed by Guy Lowell (who is interred here) and built in 1901; Lowell is also the likely designer of the superintendent's cottage that stands near the secondary entrance.

In 1874, the town of Brookline authorized the purchase of 30 acres (12 ha) for a new cemetery, as its Old Burying Ground was filling up. The town retained two landscape gardeners, Ernest Bowditch and Franklin Copeland, to oversee its layout. Most of the design for its network of lanes and paths is credited to Bowditch. The cemetery was enlarged by 1 acre (0.40 ha) in 1918 and 14 acres (5.7 ha) in 1926 to reach its present size. The first parts of the cemetery to be filled have mostly granite headstones, often with symbolic figures. In 1886, the cemetery laid down strict new rules, requiring use of slate and enforcing dimensional restrictions. These rules were later relaxed to allow for the use of dark Quincy granite, and then other forms of granite.

== Notable burials ==
Several individuals of local and national importance are buried here, including:

- Thomas Aspinwall (1786–1876) – second-longest-serving United States consul
- Gaspar G. Bacon (1886–1947) – 51st lieutenant governor of Massachusetts and President of the Massachusetts Senate from 1929–1932
- Robert Bacon (1860–1919) – statesman and diplomat
- Rev. Luther F. Beecher (1813–1903) – author of Gone From My Sight, cousin of Henry Ward Beecher and Harriet Beecher Stowe
- Arthur Tracy Cabot (1852–1912) – surgeon and president of the Massachusetts Medical Society
- Elizabeth Rogers Mason Cabot (1834–1920) – diarist and philanthropist
- Godfrey Lowell Cabot (1861–1962) – industrialist who founded the Cabot Corporation
- James Elliot Cabot (1821–1903) – philosopher and author
- John Moors Cabot (1901–1981) – diplomat and U.S. Ambassador
- Samuel Cabot Jr. (1784–1863) – Boston businessman and merchant in the Old China Trade
- Samuel Cabot III (1815–1885) – physician, surgeon, and ornithologist
- Otis Clapp, politician (Massachusetts state representative and member of the old Boston City Council), homeopath, pharmacist, publisher, bookseller, and U.S. Internal Revenue Bureau collector
- Artie Clarke (1865–1949) – Major League Baseball player for the New York Giants
- Jennie Collins (1828–1887) – labor reformer, humanitarian, and suffragist
- Elliott Carr Cutler (1888–1947) – surgeon, military physician, and medical educator
- Albert Elijah Dunning (1844–1923) – Congregationalist theologian and religious author
- Desmond Fitzgerald (1846–1926) – president of the American Society of Civil Engineers, was a trustee of the Walnut Hills Cemetery
- Horace Williams Fuller (1844–1901) – lawyer and editor who served as the first editor of The Green Bag
- Sears Gallagher (1869–1955) – New England artist
- Norman Geschwind (1926–1984) – pioneer in behavioral neurology
- Christopher A. Iannella (1913–1992) – member and president of the Boston City Council
- Ernest Ludvig Ipsen (1869–1951) – painter specializing in portraiture
- James T. Kelley (1855–1929) – architect and founding member of the Boston Architectural Club
- Guy Lowell (1870–1927) – architect and landscape architect, notably designed the Museum of Fine Arts, Boston and New York County Courthouse
- Alexander Marble (1902–1992) – diabetologist, worked at the Joslin Diabetes Center
- Fred Newman (1942–1987) – Major League Baseball pitcher for the Los Angeles/California Angels
- John Charles Olmsted (1852–1920) – landscape architect, nephew and adopted son of Frederick Law Olmsted
- Olive Higgins Prouty (1882–1974) – novelist and poet, best known for her novels Stella Dallas (1923) and Now, Voyager (1941)
- H. H. Richardson (1838–1886) – architect known for his Richardsonian Romanesque style and works such as the New York State Capitol, Trinity Church, and Allegheny County Courthouse
- Charles Hercules Rutan (1851–1914) – architect and partner of Shepley, Rutan and Coolidge with works such as the Chicago Cultural Center and South Station in Boston
- Charles Sprague Sargent (1841–1927) – botanist, founder and first leader of Boston's Arnold Arboretum.
- Julius A. Schweinfurth (1858–1931) – architect and partnered with his brother Charles F. Schweinfurth
- Henry Richardson Shepley (1887–1962) – architect and son of George Foster Shepley
- Charles Carroll Soule (1842–1913) – bookman, established the Boston Book Company and The Green Bag with Horace Williams Fuller
- John Goddard Stearns Jr. (1843–1917) – architect and cofounder of Peabody & Stearns, notable works include Kragsyde, The Breakers, and the Custom House Tower in Boston
- Daniel Tyler Jr. (1899–1967) – Massachusetts political figure
- Joe Walsh (1917–1996) – professional baseball player in the minor leagues, played shortstop
- Herbert Langford Warren (1857–1917) – architect and founder of the School of Architecture at Harvard University
- Sherman L. Whipple (1862–1930) – attorney and one of Boston's leading trial lawyers
- Eliza Orne White (1856–1947) – author
- Edward Zambara (1926–2007) – Canadian-American bass-baritone singer and music educator

== See also ==
- National Register of Historic Places listings in Brookline, Massachusetts
