= Ben Fuller =

Benjamin or Ben Fuller may refer to:

- Ben Hebard Fuller (1870–1937), Major General in the United States Marine Corps
- Ben Fuller (producer) (1875–1952), English-born Australian theatrical entrepreneur
- Benjamin Apthorp Gould Fuller (1879–1956), American philosopher
- Ben Fuller (singer), American contemporary Christian music singer-songwriter
