= Charles Carroll Soule =

American bookman

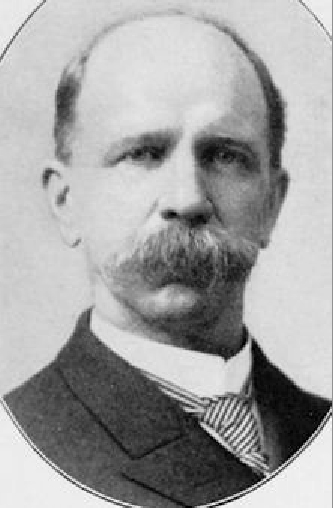
- Born: June 25, 1842; Boston, Massachusetts
- Died: January 7, 1913 (aged 70); Brookline, Massachusetts
- Burial place: Walnut Hills Cemetery
- Education: Boston Latin School; Harvard College
- Occupation: Bookman
- Known for: Founder of The Green Bag
- Spouse: Louisa Charless Farwell (m. 1878)

Charles Carroll Soule (June 25, 1842 – January 7, 1913) was an American bookman with a side specialty in the architecture of libraries. Born in Boston to Richard Soule Jr. (1812–1877) and Harriet Winsor (1816–1905) he attended the Boston Latin School and Harvard College (1862), and fought in the Civil War (44th and 55th Regiment Massachusetts Volunteer Infantries). After the war he engaged in public speaking about post-slavery reconciliation in Orangeburg County, South Carolina.

In the 1870s he worked in St. Louis in the publishing firm of Soule, Thomas & Winsor. In the 1880s he ran a business selling law books from offices in Pemberton Square, Boston, and in 1886 opened a bookshop in a former church on Beacon Street, near the Boston Athenaeum. He established the Boston Book Company in 1889, and established The Green Bag, a legal news magazine with Horace Williams Fuller as editor. He belonged to the American Library Association.

He married Louisa Charless Farwell in 1878 and had 4 children. Towards the end of his life he resided in Brookline.

== See also ==
- Saint Paul Public Library, Minnesota, designed by Soule
