= Rebecca Hull =

Rebecca Hull may refer to:

- Rebecca Mahoney (born 1983), née Hull, New Zealand rugby union player and referee
- Rebecca Parker Clarke (1790–1865), née Hull, American abolitionist and faith leader
