= Horace Fuller =

Horace Fuller may refer to:

- Horace H. Fuller, American soldier and general
- Horace Williams Fuller, American lawyer and editor
