= Jennie Collins =

American labor reformer, humanitarian and suffragist

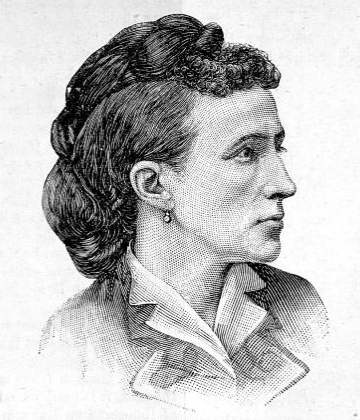
- Born: Jane Collins; 1828; Amoskeag, New Hampshire
- Died: July 20, 1887 (aged 59); Brookline, Massachusetts
- Resting place: Walnut Hills Cemetery
- Known for: labor reformer, humanitarian, suffragist

Jane "Jennie" Collins (1828–1887) was an American labor reformer, humanitarian, and suffragist. Orphaned as a child, she supported herself at 14 by working in the cotton mills, and later as a domestic and a seamstress. She was active in the abolitionist and labor movements, volunteered in military hospitals during the Civil War, and founded a charity for poor working women in Boston. In 1870, at the invitation of Susan B. Anthony, she addressed the National Woman Suffrage Association convention in Washington. The following year, she became one of the first working-class women in the United States to publish a volume of her own writings: Nature's Aristocracy; Or, Battles and Wounds in Time of Peace. A Plea for the Oppressed.

== Biography ==
=== Early life ===
Jennie Collins was born into poverty in Amoskeag, New Hampshire (now part of Manchester), in 1828. Orphaned as a child, she was raised by her Quaker grandmother, who died when Jennie was 14. Left to fend for herself, she worked for some time in the cotton mills of Lawrence and Lowell, then as a domestic in the home of Judge John Lowell in Boston. From 1861 to 1870 she worked as a vest maker for Macullar, Williams & Parker, a clothing manufacturer whose owners later helped finance her philanthropic endeavors. While working in Boston she took evening classes in history and politics, and taught a history class herself at the Church of the Unity. Collins was an admirer of the Unitarian minister Theodore Parker, who was preaching in Boston at the time. She was also deeply interested in Spiritualism, a religious movement that was linked with labor and women's rights.

Collins was an outspoken opponent of slavery, as was Parker. During the Civil War she volunteered in military hospitals, taught soldiers' children, and organized a group of local women who did charitable work for Union soldiers in their spare time.

=== Activism ===
While still working as a vest maker, Collins began speaking out on labor and women's issues and campaigning for political candidates. At one event, at which she was the sole woman speaker, she spoke in support of Ulysses S. Grant, Charles Sumner, and William Claflin. She made her first major public address in 1868, at Washington Hall, in support of women's rights. She approached the subject from a distinctly working-class perspective, much as Margaret Foley did decades later. That same year, she spoke at the organizing conference of the Daughters of St. Crispin, the first national women's labor union in the United States. Her reputation grew, and she became one of Boston's leading speakers on issues such as child labor reform, the eight-hour day, and better wages and working conditions for women. In 1869 she joined the National Labor Reform League and helped organize the Boston Working Women's League.

In the fall of 1869 she spoke in support of striking workers at the Cocheco Mill in Dover, New Hampshire. At one event, she addressed a crowd of thousands at Huntington Hall in Lowell, where she called for a boycott: "We working women will wear fig-leaf dresses before we will patronize the Cocheco Company." Her rousing speech attracted the notice of suffragist Susan B. Anthony, who invited Collins to speak at the 1870 convention of the National Woman Suffrage Association. Her speech at the Union League Hall in Washington was a "decided success". One observer wrote later that Collins "tells her stories with such a tender, natural pathos that few eyes are dry during her speeches."

=== Boffin's Bower ===
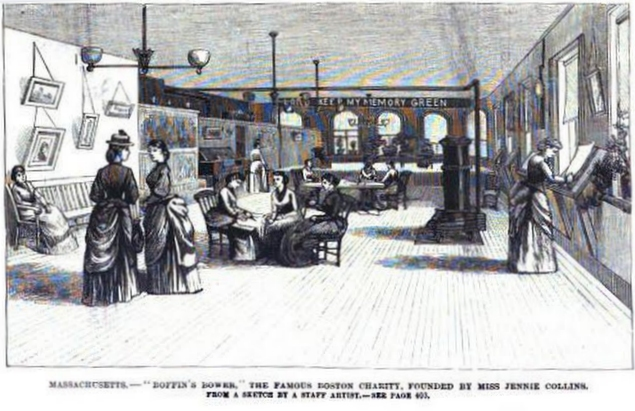
Artist's depiction of Boffin's Bower. Frank Leslie's Illustrated Newspaper, 1887.

In the summer of 1870, with the backing of area business leaders, Collins established Boffin's Bower, a social center for working women, at 813 Washington Street. Its unusual name was derived from the Dickens novel, Our Mutual Friend. As Collins explained later, "If I had called my place 'Headquarters for Working Women,' or by any similar name, it would have attracted no attention whatever. But when I put up the sign 'Boffin's Bower' everybody ran up to the room to see what the place was. I made lots of acquaintances and friends that way, and got a great deal of help."

Boffin's Bower started modestly as a sitting room with a piano, and expanded to include a reading room with books and newspapers, and a workshop with sewing machines. The Bower provided food and clothing to the needy, and temporary lodging to a small number of homeless women. Through her connections with local businesses, Collins helped hundreds of women find employment each year; among them, the first female employees of the Boston Post Office. On special occasions she arranged for entertainment; there were Christmas dinners, comical readings, musical performances, and lectures by local speakers such as Julia Ward Howe.

Collins knew that charitable work could not address the underlying causes of poverty, and she continually tried to do more. At one point she planned to open a "kitchen school", and in 1871 she petitioned the state legislature for aid in establishing a Young Woman's Apprentice Association to provide job training for unskilled workers. Through the Working Women's League, she and Aurora Phelps tried to create a woman-run homesteading community called "Aurora" in rural Massachusetts, but could not raise enough capital. Meanwhile, Collins had the more immediate needs of her "girls" to attend to. In 1872, the Great Boston Fire destroyed 65 acres (26 ha) of Boston's downtown. Hundreds of women who had lost their jobs, and in some cases their homes as well, flocked to the Bower for help.

To raise funds for Boffin's Bower, Collins gave paid lectures and organized an annual fair. She also contributed most of the proceeds from her book, Nature's Aristocracy, edited by Russell Conwell and published in 1871. Collins was one of the first working-class women in the United States to publish a volume of her own writings. The book is a collection of autobiographical sketches, polemics, and fictional vignettes, loosely centered around the argument that American society had strayed from the ideals enshrined in the Constitution, creating a corrupt aristocracy and dangerous levels of wealth inequality.

Despite her lack of formal education, and perhaps inspired by working-class writers such as Lucy Larcom as well as Dickens, Collins dreamed of a literary career that never materialized. Her annual reports on Boffin's Bower, however, were widely read and reported on in newspapers across the country, calling attention to the needs of those she called "the accidental poor": those who worked hard but could not support themselves in sickness or old age, and who could not obtain help from charitable institutions because they had not been "trained as mendicants". She wrote movingly of the plight of working mothers who had no access to affordable child care, women who were paid starvation wages, and girls who were cheated of their pay. In 1874 her input was sought by the State Bureau of Labor Statistics for a report on Boston's working women.

She never married. Her contemporaries were apt to describe her in terms at once unflattering and admiring: unrefined and pugnacious; intelligent, witty, and kind-hearted. A reporter's description in the Sacramento Daily Union is typical:

A little, thin, angular, wiry figure, long past the bloom of youth, scorning all pretensions to the conventionalities of society or the rostrum, she is pre-eminently the champion and exponent of the working-women of New England.

=== Later years ===
Despite suffering from asthma, Collins was active until the end of her life. She contributed prolifically to newspapers and journals, as well as publishing annual reports for Boffin's Bower. During her last years, she lived in the home of a widowed friend named Eveline J. Pillsbury, and Pillsbury's brother. In 1887, she died of consumption at the home of a friend in Brookline. Her grave marker at the Walnut Hills Cemetery reads, "Jennie Collins, the Working-Girl's Friend, and Founder of 'Boffin's Bower.' Died July 20, 1887, aged 59 Years."

== Legacy ==
Boffin's Bower predated South End House, considered Boston's first settlement house, by nearly two decades. Although Boffin's Bower served many of the same functions as a settlement house, it was not staffed by upper-class, college-educated reformers intent on studying the problems of the working poor, but by a working-class woman already familiar with them. After Collins's death, a women's charitable organization called the Helping Hand Society took over the work of Boffin's Bower, opening a low-rent rooming house for working girls on Carver Street (now Charles Street South), near the Women's Educational and Industrial Union. The Rev. Edward Everett Hale remarked at the time that thirty or forty such homes were needed in Boston.

A new edition of Nature's Aristocracy was published by the University of Nebraska Press in 2010. In her introduction, historian Judith Ranta calls it "the first attempt by a U.S. author of any background or gender to produce an extended overview of working-class life."

Jennie Collins and Boffin's Bower are remembered on the Boston Women's Heritage Trail.

== Writings ==
- Nature's Aristocracy; Or, Battles and Wounds in Time of Peace. A Plea for the Oppressed. Lee & Shepard. 1871.
- A Plan for Future Work, in Behalf of the Working Women. G. L. Keyes. 1872. OCLC 866988659.
- "New England Factories". The Revolution. January 13, 1870. Archived from the original on May 8, 2023.
