= Otis Clapp & Son =

American pharmaceutical company

Modern logo and wordmark

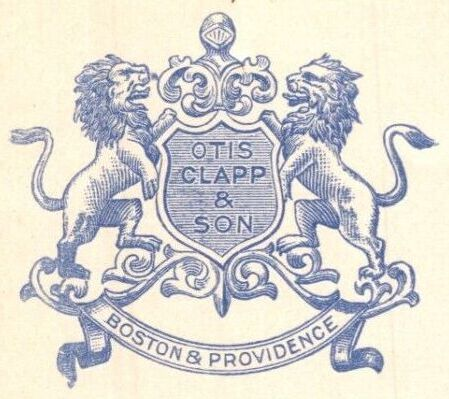
Former logo and wordmark

Otis Clapp & Son (today branded simply as "Otis Clapp") is an American pharmaceutical manufacturer which has been owned by Medique since 2008. Prior to its acquisition by Medique, was an independent company for a 168 year history, making it one of the United States' longest-operating pharmaceutical manufacturers.

Otis Clapp & Son was founded in 1840 by Otis Clapp as a homeopathic-focused pharmacy. The pharmacy grew into a sizable operation as homeopathics grew in popularity in the New England region. It expanded its operations further in the 1870s after Clapp's son, James Wilkinson Clapp, became a partner and it assumed the name "Otis Clapp & Son". By the 1890s, the company had expanded its operations, including into the manufacture of medical equipment such as x-ray machines. In the 1990s, it began to narrow its operations by focusing on the manufacture pharmaceuticals.

== History ==
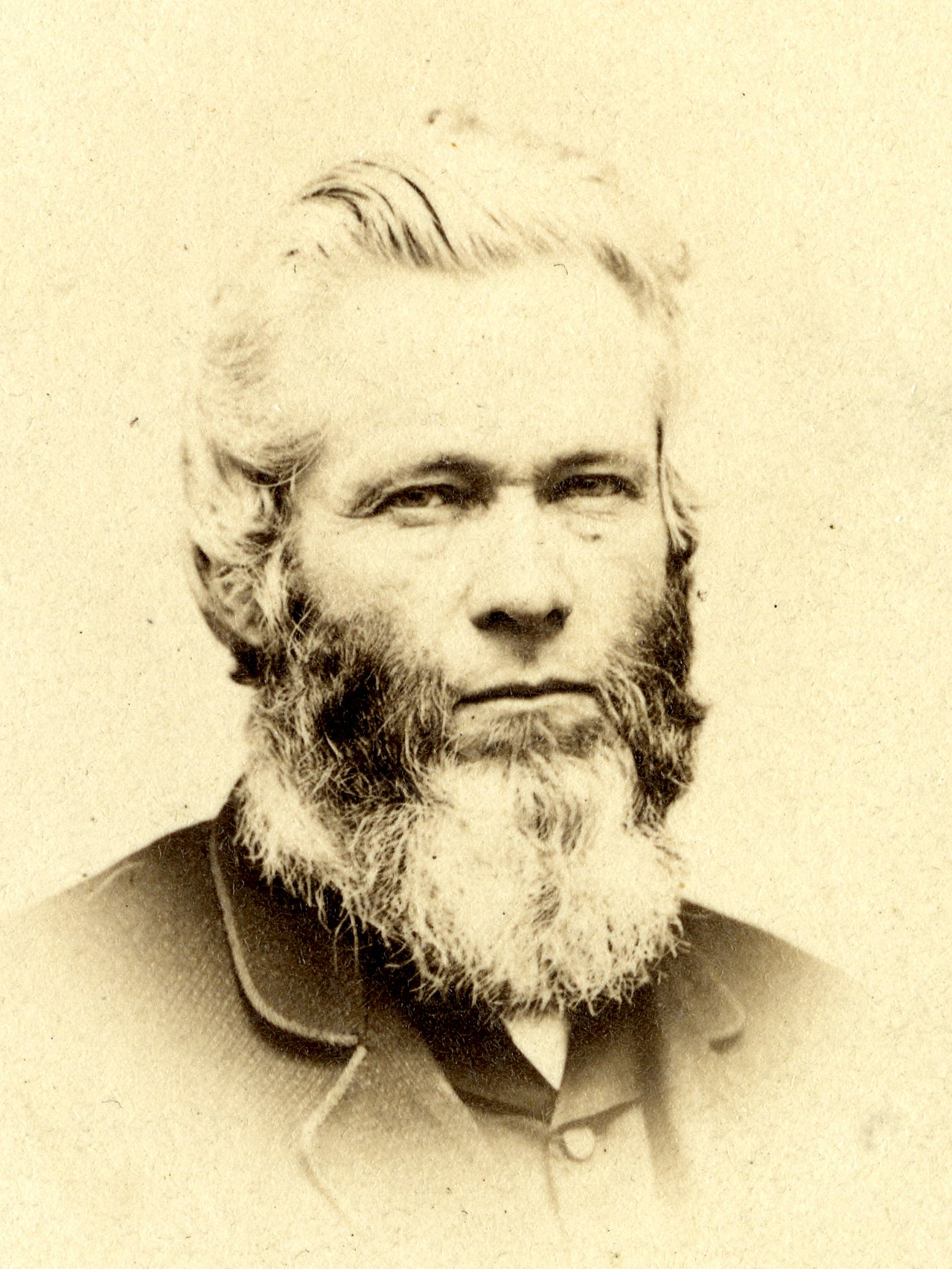
Otis Clapp (photographed circa 1870)

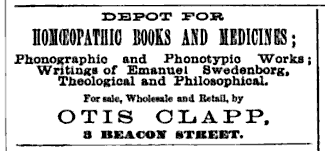
1861 advertisement for Clapp's bookselling and pharmaceuticals

In 1840, publisher and bookseller Otis Clapp opened a pharmacy focused on homeopathics in the Back Bay of Boston, Massachusetts. At the time it opened, the city had only three or four homeopathic physicians. The pharmacy is considered to have been the United States' second-established homeopathic pharmacy, and the first in the New England region. Initially, its inventory was limited, however as homeopathy grew more popular in New England so too did the pharmacy. To grow, it moved the location of its storefront in both 1841 and 1855. It became one of the world's largest homeopathic pharmacies, and was well-known and long-operating. Otis Clapp manufactured and marketed his own homeopathic medicines.

In the 1870s, his son joined as a business partner of the operation, which was renamed "Otis Clapp & Son" in 1874. The younger Dr. Clapp was a research scientist, businessman, and professor of pharmacy at the Boston University Medical School. He had previously worked in his father's store beginning at fourteen years of age. A few years after the father and the son became partners, the company's storefront again moved., and a second store was opened after that. In the 1880s, the pharmacy established a second location in Providence, Rhode Island.

The operation expanded its business to include the sale of laboratory equipment; such equipment for medicine and bacteriology. By the 1890s, the company was manufacturing x-ray machines. In 1912, the company built a new headquarters in Boston. The company long remained under the Clapp family's ownership.

In the mid-20th century, the company innovated in the production of medicine dispensing equipment. In the late 1990s, the company began specializing in the manufacture of over-the-counter drugs, marketing especially to sell their products to be sold by employers for use in workplaces.

In 2008, the company (by then known as Otis Clapp and Buffington) was acquired by Medique Inc. It was, by that time, one of the oldest operating pharmaceutical manufacturers in the United States. Products continue to be sold by Medique under the "Otis Clapp" brand name.

== Gallery ==
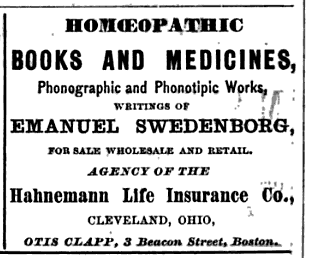
Advertisement for Otis Clapp's business operations, published in the 1868 Boston Directory

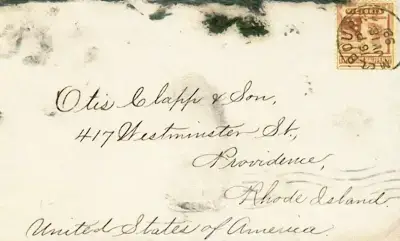
Antique envelope addressed to Otis Clapp & Son

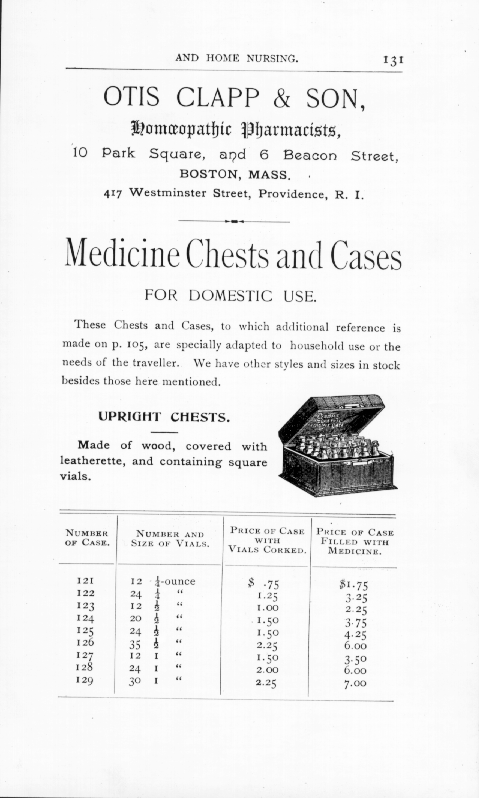
Vintage avertisement for medicine kits that were sold by the company

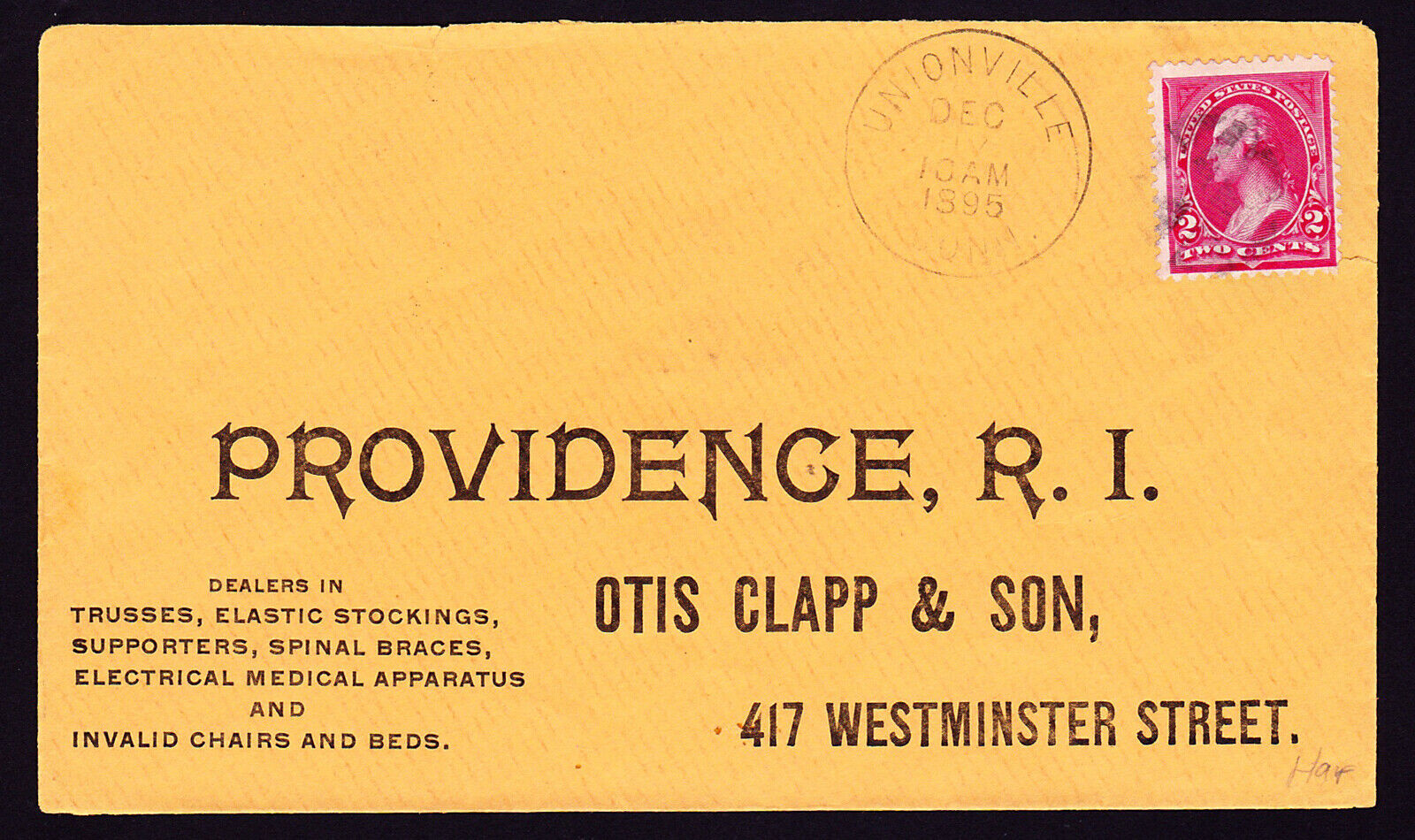
Cover envelope from a 1895 Otis Clapp & Son advertising mailer

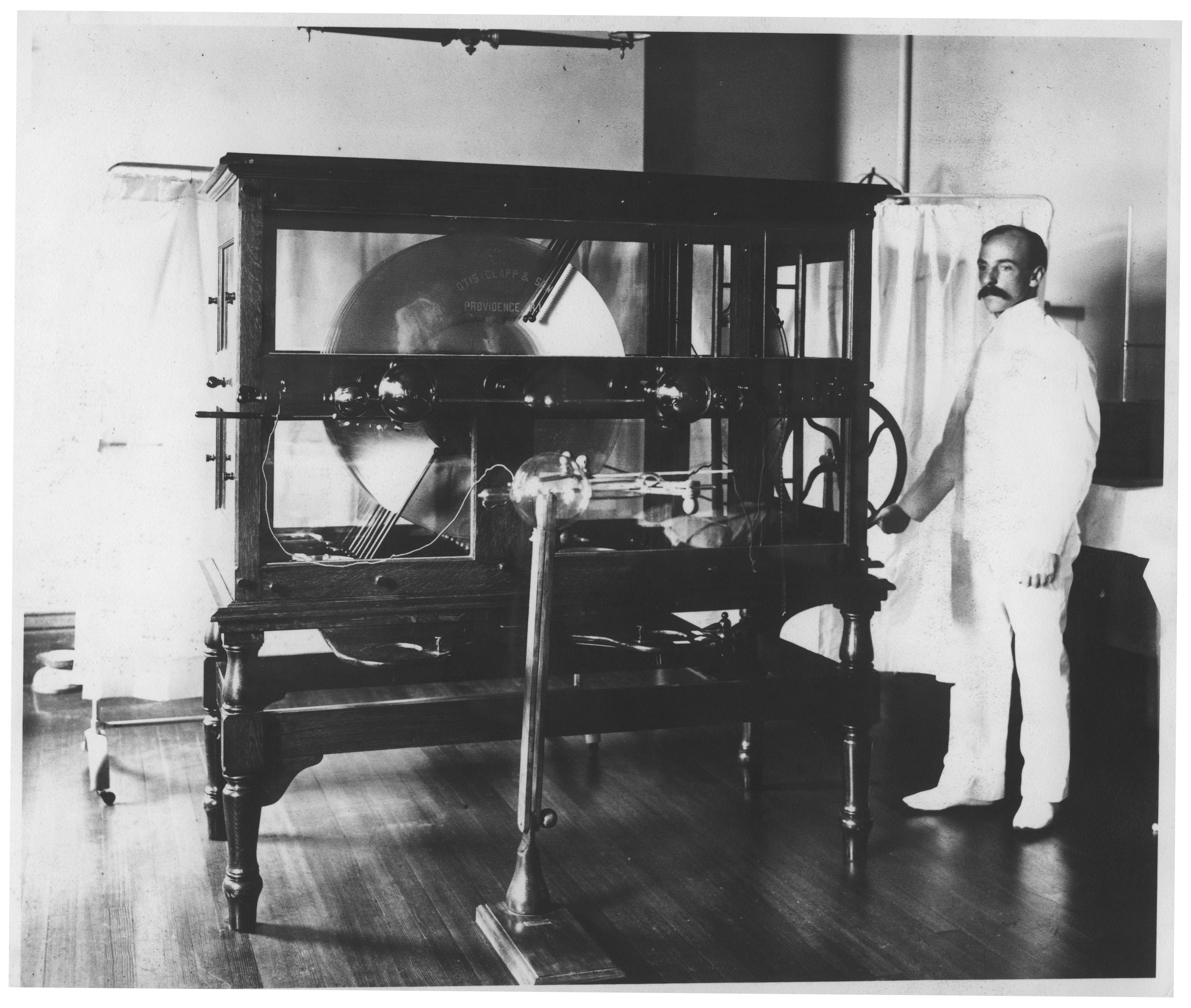
X-ray machine manufactured by Otis Clapp & Son, photographed circa 1896

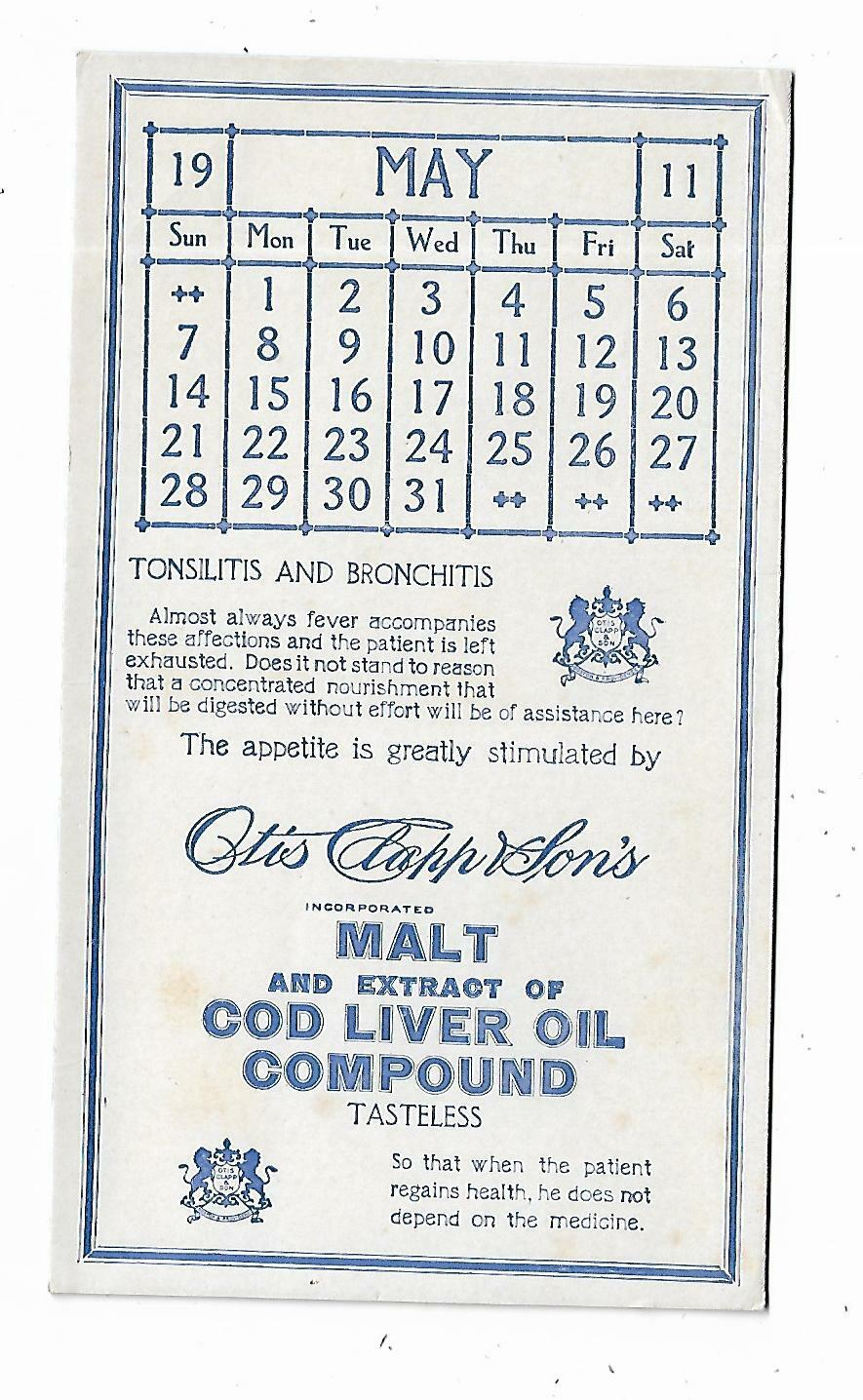
1911 advertisement for Otis & Clapp Malt Liver Oil Compound

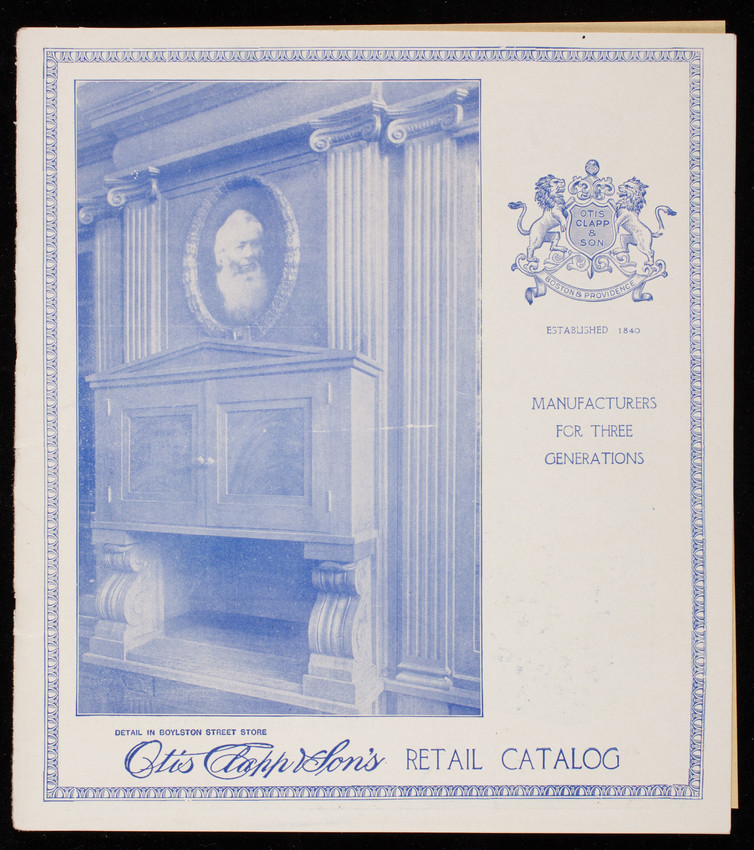
1917 Otis & Clapp retail catalogue

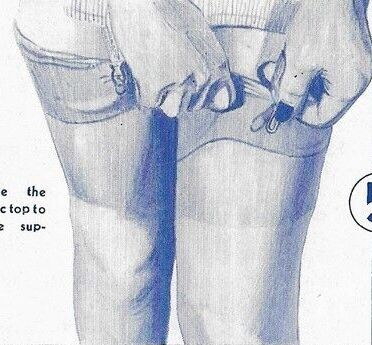
Illustration of Shadowthin Elastic Stockings, a hosiery product that was manufactured by the company

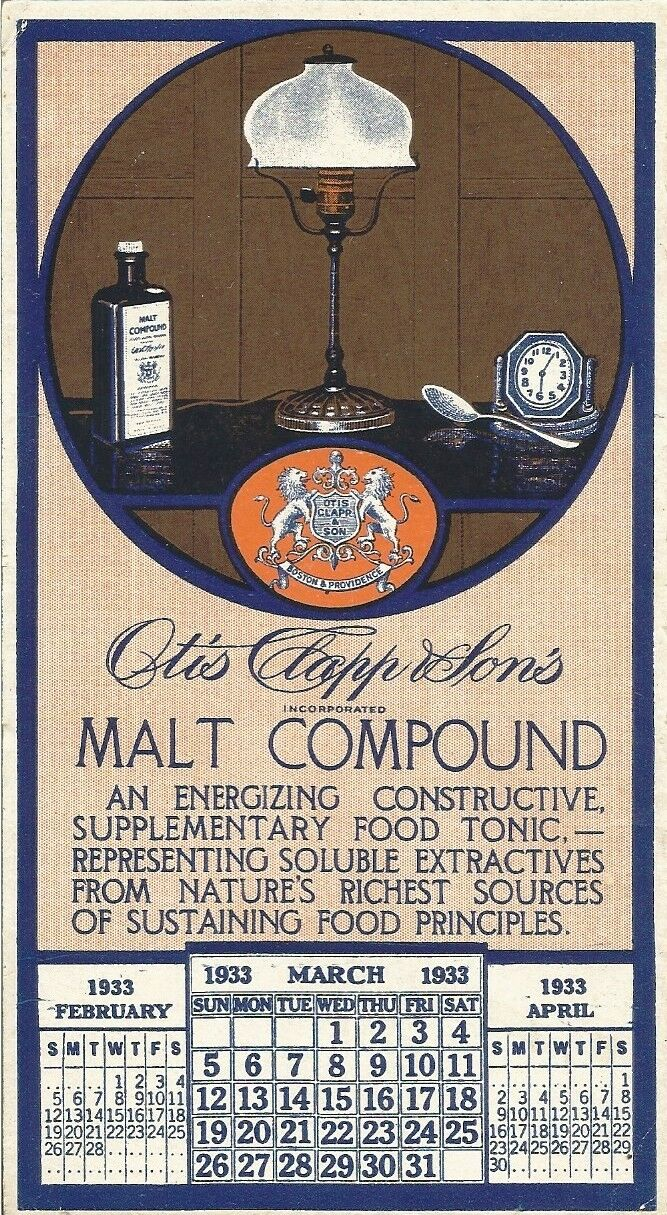
1933 advertisement for Otis Clapp & Son's Malt Compound
