= Aurora Phelps =

American land reformer, labor organizer and women's rights advocate

Aurora H. C. Phelps (1839 – 4 January 1876) was an American land reformer, labor organizer and leader, and women's rights advocate. She founded multiple organizations to fight against women workers' poverty.

She worked with the State of Massachusetts in order to provide housing for women workers and give them a chance to buy the lands they lived on. She founded a community she called Aurora a few miles north of Boston. Aurora survived for a few years and died with Phelps.

== Early life ==
Aurora Phelps was born in Cortland, New York, to John and Aurilla Phelps, and grew up in Elmira where she became a Baptist. When she was 9 and 18, she traveled to England with her family. During the second trip, she married and had a child. Her husband died and there is no archival proof of neither husband nor child.

In 1859, she assumed her former surname "Phelps" and came back to the United States. She went to Oberlin College in Ohio and pursued further studies in Galesburg where she then became a domestic worker. During the Civil War, she became a nurse. In 1865, after the war ended, she moved to Boston where she started working in factories and became involved in the labor union movements.

Around 1873, Phelps started suffering from Bright's disease. She died in poverty within Aurora. The few items she left behind couldn't cover the cost of the funeral, which was paid for by the community left in Aurora before it fizzled out.

== Activism ==
In 1864, she founded the Women's Garden Homestead League in order to ask the authorities to fund housing for women head of families around Boston. Along with Jennie Collins and Elizabeth La Pierre Daniels, two factory worker Phelps met in the New England Labor Reform League, she created the Boston Working Women's League. This league became an important outlet for poor women workers, most of whom had lost a father, husband or fiance during the war. Working Women's League activists asked for better salaries for seamstresses and other workers within the textile industry, decent housing for women and the creation or a free employment bureau.

Phelps became more and more active within the labor movement and became a journalist for American Workman in order to defend women factory workers' rights.

=== Women's Garden Homestead League's petition ===
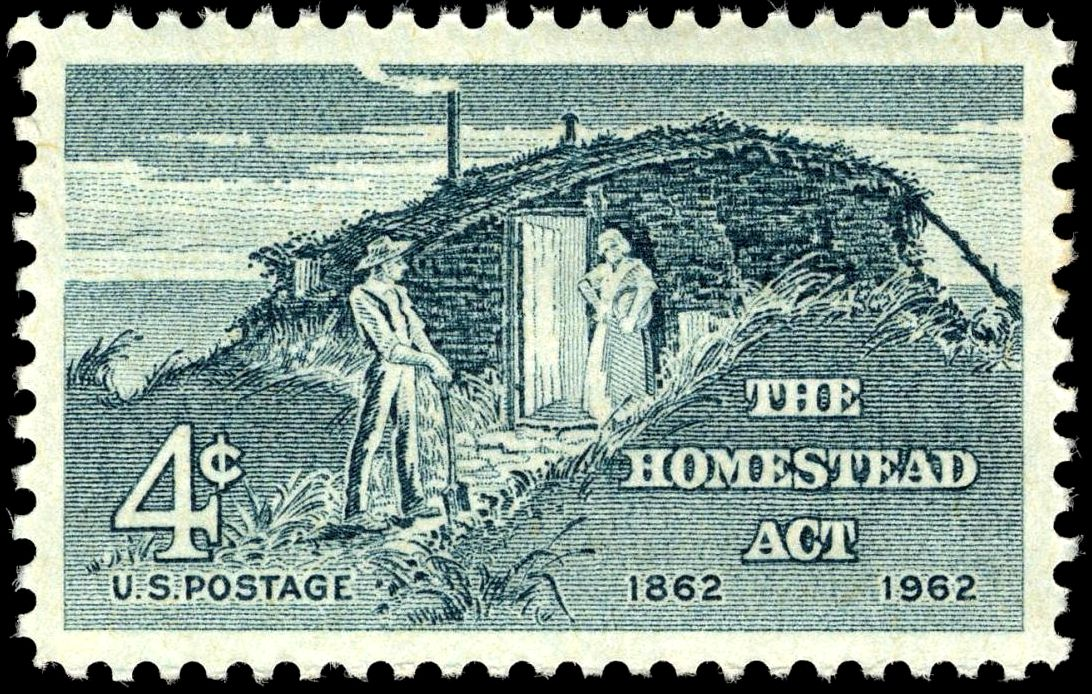
Commemorative stamp for the 1862 Homestead Act (1962)

In 1869, Phelps wrote up a petition as a Women's Garden Homestead League's member and passed it from hand to hand thanks to the Boston Working Women's League. She petitioned the Massachusetts government to ask for funds in order for women to purchase land and become independent farmers. Her project drew inspiration from the 1862 Homestead Act which permitted heads of families (women included) to go west and establish a home and business on (previously) public-owned lands. The Women's Garden Homestead League wanted to empower women to move on the outskirts of Boston in order to still have access to the city's infrastructures (like schools and markets) and to avoid urban inequalities (like unfit housing). The project made provisions for tools, seeds and houses in which women could live for 3 years without rent, so that they could have time to establish their farms.

Phelp's proposal is typical of british, american and irish labor union theory and practice. The main point is that in the face or industrialization and the introduction of machinery, land reform would lead to a different kind of independence. Women could achieve the Jeffersonian American Dream by becoming independent proprietors and produce their own wealth.

The petition was successful among women workers because of its new way of advocating for women as fully fledged citizens and heads of families. For rhetorical reasons, the tone of the petition was almost self-patronizing. However, it was also the product of a civil conscience awoken by the war. The goal was to present a gift of land from the State as a payment for women's sacrifice during the war, when they had to spend day and night sewing uniforms, or become nurses. Moreover, the petition clearly stated working women's right and desire to speak for themselves, which went against the traditional asumption that educated, higher class women should do the talking for them. This petition was a statement for economic, political and moral independence.

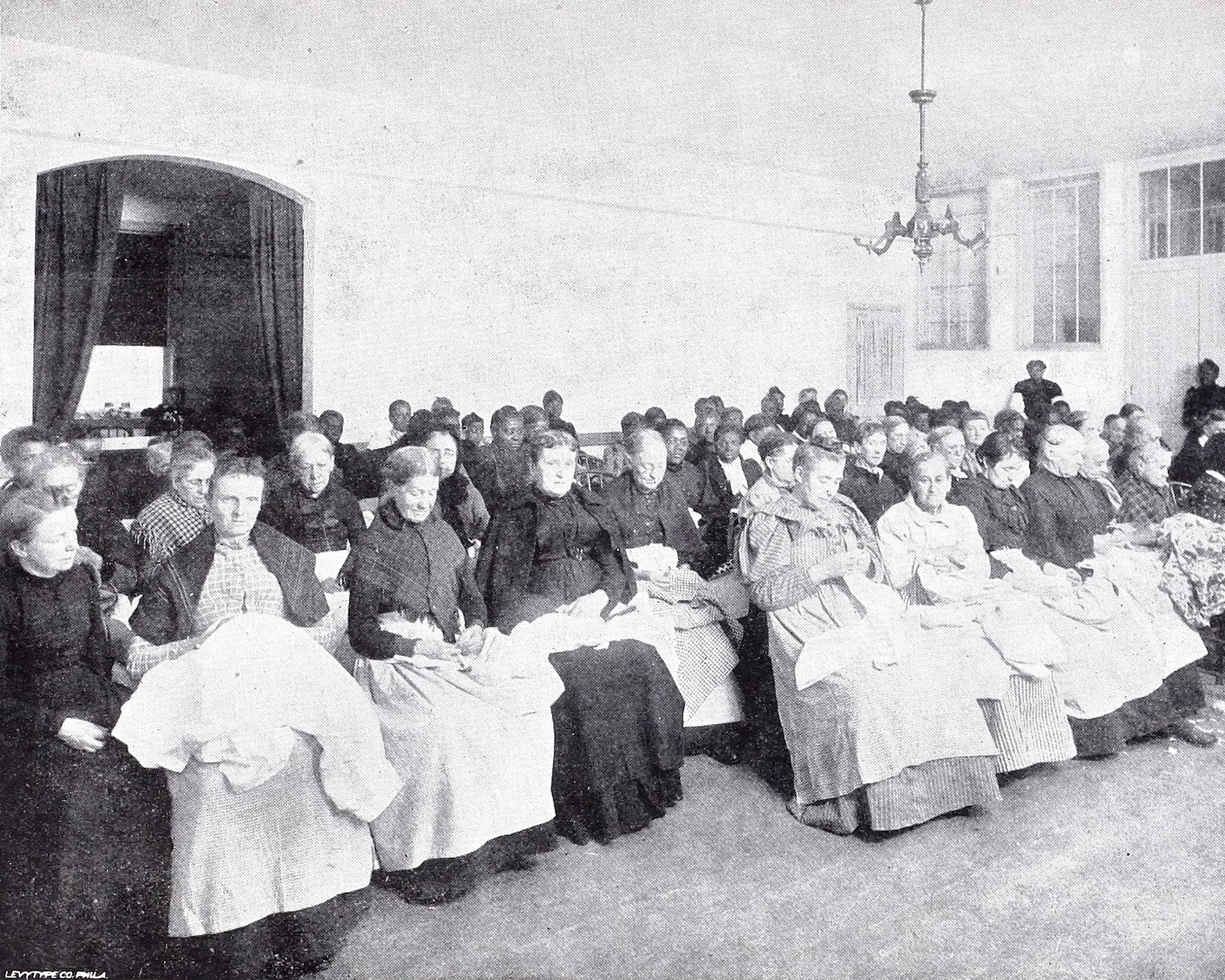
Womens Sewing Room at the House of Industry in Philadelphia (1898)

In April 1869, Phelps, Jennie Collins and Elizabeth La Pierre Daniels organised a meeting to present their project and the petition to the public. They invited land reformists and other affluent activists. The event was covered by journalists like Parker Pillsbury, Elizabeth Cady Stanton and Susan B. Anthony. In the morning, they spoke to an audience of a couple dozen people, but in the evening, when the women were let out of work, the crowd reached 300 people.

During the meeting, they started by talking about women's working conditions and made a point to describe how hard their living conditions were as well, especially when they had to care for young children. Then, they attributed women's misery to two main causes : the huge disparity between skilled worker's salaries (the women who made luxury shirts for wealthy men) and laywomen factory workers, and the subdivision of labour where there used to be craftmanship. Although seamstresses who benefitted from good salaries did not necesserally want to move out of Boston, they supported the rights of all women to choose their own paths.

=== Aurora, Woburn ===
The State authorities set up a hearing for Phelps because of the popularity of her fight. Her demands weren't met directly but in 1871, the Women's Garden Homestead League was invited within the government structure with Phelps as a director. She collected US$5,000 (equivalent to $134,375 in 2025) from a thousand subscribers to buy land with. She purchased 60 acres of wooded land in Woburn, along a railway leading to Boston. The project was to divide the land in small allotments where her subscribers would be able to settle. They did move in and created a community Phelps named Aurora, after herself.

In Aurora, land ownership was for women only, and property passed down from mother to daughter. Rent was paid to reimburse the cost of the land. Each allotment was divided to allow for house and a garden. The gender role shift that took place in Aurora was remarked upon and sometimes mocked by journalists at the time.

Wanting to diversify Aurora's economy, Phelps invited labor unionists and residents to found a commercial laundry in 1873. The project was probably inspired by a unionized laundry founded by women workers in Troy. Despite great enthusiasm, the laundry was never built and Aurora struggled to survive, in part because women could not accumulate enough capital and were forbidden access to lawns.

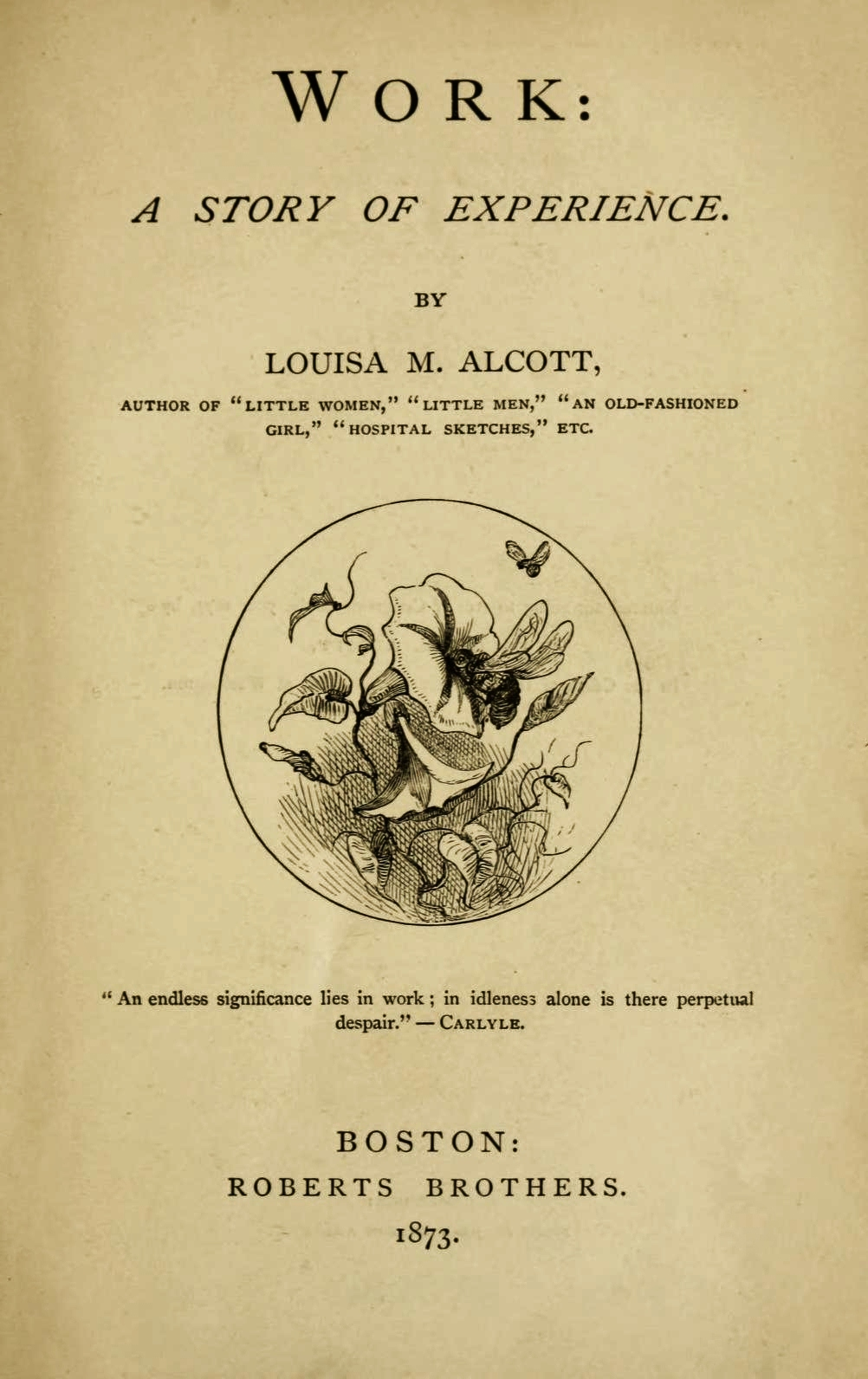
Title page from Work: A story of experience

== Heritage ==
When she was alive, Phelps was mocked by the local press who nicknamed her "belligerent Queen of the Amazons". Contrary to Jennie Collins, Aurora Phelps wasn't writted about after her death much. When newspapers mentionned her, she was described as a naive idealist.

However, it is possible that Louisa May Alcott took inspiration from Phelps and Aurora to create the character of Christie Devon in Work: A Story of Experience.

Phelps' life and work was rediscovered in the 1980s by lesbians and feminists. They presented her as a brave pioneer forgotten by America's male-centered history.
