= Elizabeth Rogers Mason Cabot =

American philanthropist and diarist (1834–1920)

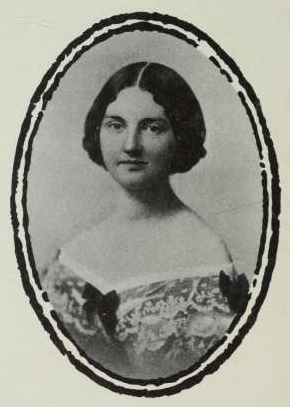
- Born: Elizabeth Rogers Mason; May 25, 1834; Boston, Massachusetts
- Died: December 12, 1920 (aged 86); Brookline, Massachusetts
- Burial place: Walnut Hills Cemetery
- Spouse: Walter Channing Cabot (m. 1860; died 1904)
- Children: 5
- Parent(s): William Powell Mason; Hannah Rogers

Elizabeth Rogers Mason Cabot (May 25, 1834 – December 12, 1920) was an American diarist and philanthropist.

== Early life ==
Cabot was born in Boston on May 25, 1834, to a prominent Boston family. Her parents were William Powell Mason, a prominent lawyer, and Hannah Rogers Mason, a descendent of Harvard president John Rogers and of Thomas Dudley, governor of the Massachusetts Bay Colony. Growing up, Cabot lived in Boston and spent her summers in Walpole, New Hampshire.

== Philanthropy ==
Cabot was involved in running the Home for Aged Colored Women in Boston, as well as the Children's Aid Society and the Woman's Education Association. She was also a member of the Federal Street Unitarian Church (the congregation continues at the Arlington Street Church), where she taught Sunday school.

Cabot's diary was published by Beacon Press in 1991 under the title, More Than Common Powers of Perception. The diary was edited by P.A.M. Taylor.

== Personal life ==
She married Walter Channing Cabot, son of Samuel Cabot Jr., in 1860. The couple had five children and lived in Brookline and Manchester, Massachusetts.

Cabot died December 12, 1920, at her home in Brookline, Massachusetts.
