= Artemas Ward Jr. =

American politician (1762–1847)

Member of the U.S. House of Representatives from Massachusetts's 1st district
- In office March 4, 1813 – March 3, 1817
- Preceded by: Josiah Quincy III
- Succeeded by: Jonathan Mason

Member of the Massachusetts Senate
- In office 1818-1819

Member of the Massachusetts House of Representatives
- In office 1796-1800

Personal details
- Born: January 9, 1762 Shrewsbury, Province of Massachusetts Bay, British America
- Died: October 7, 1847 (aged 85) Boston, Massachusetts, U.S.
- Party: Federalist

Artemas Ward Jr. (January 9, 1762 – October 7, 1847), like his father, Artemas Ward, was a United States representative from Massachusetts. He served in the Thirteenth Congress and Fourteenth Congress (1813–1817). He was a member of the Federalist Party.

== Biography ==
Ward was born in Shrewsbury in the Province of Massachusetts Bay on January 9, 1762. He graduated from Harvard University in 1783, studied law, was admitted to the bar in 1783, and practiced in Weston.

From 1796 to 1800, Ward served in the Massachusetts House of Representatives. He moved to Charlestown in 1800, where he continued to practice law.

Ward served in the Massachusetts House of Representatives again in 1811 and, in 1812, was elected to the United States House of Representatives. He was reelected in 1814. He served in the Thirteenth and Fourteenth Congresses (March 4, 1813 – March 3, 1817).

Ward served in the Massachusetts State Senate in 1818 and 1819, and was a member of the Massachusetts Constitutional Convention of 1820–1821.

From 1820 to 1839 Ward was Chief Justice of Boston's Court of Common Pleas from 1820 to 1839.

He was a member of the Harvard University Board of Overseers from 1810 to 1844.

Ward died in Boston on October 7, 1847. He was buried at Mount Auburn Cemetery in Cambridge.

U.S. House of Representatives
Preceded by Josiah Quincy III	Member of the U.S. House of Representatives from Massachusetts district 1 March 4, 1813 – March 3, 1817	Succeeded by Jonathan Mason
