= Eliza Orne White =

American writer

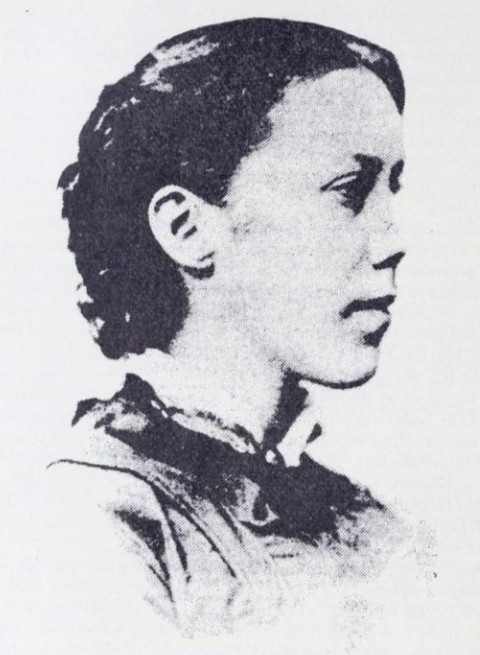
- Born: August 2, 1856; Keene, New Hampshire, U.S.
- Died: January 23, 1947 (aged 90); Brookline, Massachusetts, U.S.
- Burial place: Walnut Hills Cemetery
- Occupations: Writer; novelist
- Relatives: Chester Harding (grandfather)
- Penname: Alex

Eliza Orne White (August 2, 1856 – January 23, 1947) was an American writer. She published 41 books, including 29 books for children.

== Early life and education ==
Eliza Orne White was born on August 2, 1856 in Keene, New Hampshire. She was the daughter of William Orne White, a Unitarian minister, and Margaret Eliot Harding, daughter of the portrait painter Chester Harding. At the age of eleven, she went to a reading given by Charles Dickens, who read from The Pickwick Papers and The Death of Little Nell; this event remained in White's memory even years later when Bertha Mahony interviewed White for an article in The Horn Book Magazine. She had eye trouble at the age of 14 that caused her to miss a year of school. At 16 she contracted typhoid and stopped attending public school. She later attended Miss Hall's School for Girls in Roxbury, Massachusetts, for a year.

== Career ==
White started publishing children's stories at the age of 18. She published in The Christian Register and other magazines using the penname "Alex". Her 1888 social comedy, "A Browning Courtship", was published in The Atlantic.

White's first children's book, When Molly Was Six, was published in 1894. In 1890 she published Miss Brooks, her first book that was written for an adult audience.

White wrote 49 books over the course of her career, with 29 books directed to a young audience.

White also edited a book on her father.

== Personal life ==
For the last thirty years of her life, starting around 1915, White was blind and mostly deaf. She died on January 23, 1947, in Brookline, Massachusetts.

== Selected publications ==
- White, Eliza Orne (1903). Lesley Chilton. Houghton, Mifflin and Company.
- White, Eliza Orne (1935). Ann Frances. Houghton Mifflin. OCLC 11037336.
- White, Eliza Orne (1934). Lending Mary. Houghton Mifflin Co. OCLC 763899749.
- White, Eliza Orne (1941). "I, the autobiography of a cat | WorldCat.org". www.worldcat.org.
- White, Eliza (1944). When Esther was a Little Girl. by Eliza Orne White: Good (1944) | World of Rare Books.
