= Albert Elijah Dunning =

American theologian

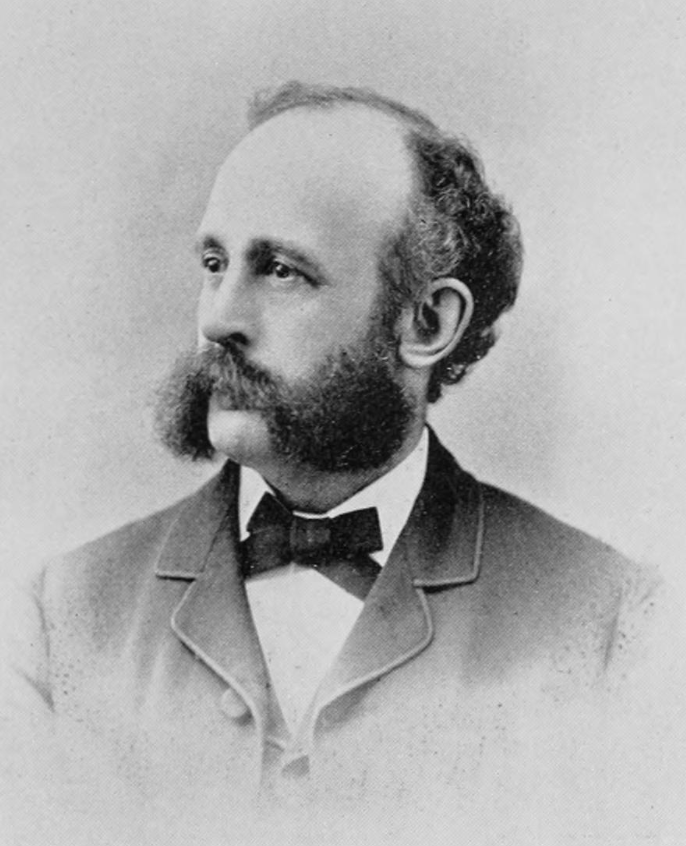
- Born: January 5, 1844; Brookfield, Connecticut, U.S.
- Died: November 14, 1923 (aged 79); Brookline, Massachusetts, U.S.
- Burial place: Walnut Hills Cemetery
- Education: Bryant & Stratton College; Yale University; Andover Theological Seminary; Beloit College
- Occupation: Theologian
- Spouse: Harriet W. Beekman (m. 1870)

Albert Elijah Dunning (January 5, 1844 – November 14, 1923) was an American Congregationalist theologian.

== Early life and education ==
He was born in Brookfield, Connecticut and attended Fort Edward Institute from 1860 to 1861. He graduated from Bryant & Stratton College (1862) and Yale University (1867), where he was Phi Beta Kappa and a member of Skull and Bones. He graduated from Andover Theological Seminary in 1870 and Beloit College in 1889 with a DD.

== Career ==
He was pastor of the Highland Congregational Church in Roxbury, Boston (1870–1881). He was editor of The Congregationalist (1889–1911) and Pilgrim Teacher (1873–1877). He was author of Bible Studies (1886); Congregationalists in America (1894); and The Making of the Bible (1911).

== Personal life ==
He married Harriet W. Beekman on December 27, 1870.

== Death ==
He died at his home in Brookline, Massachusetts, on November 14, 1923, and was buried at Walnut Hills Cemetery.
