= Otis Clapp =

American publisher, bookseller, homeopath, pharmacist, and politician

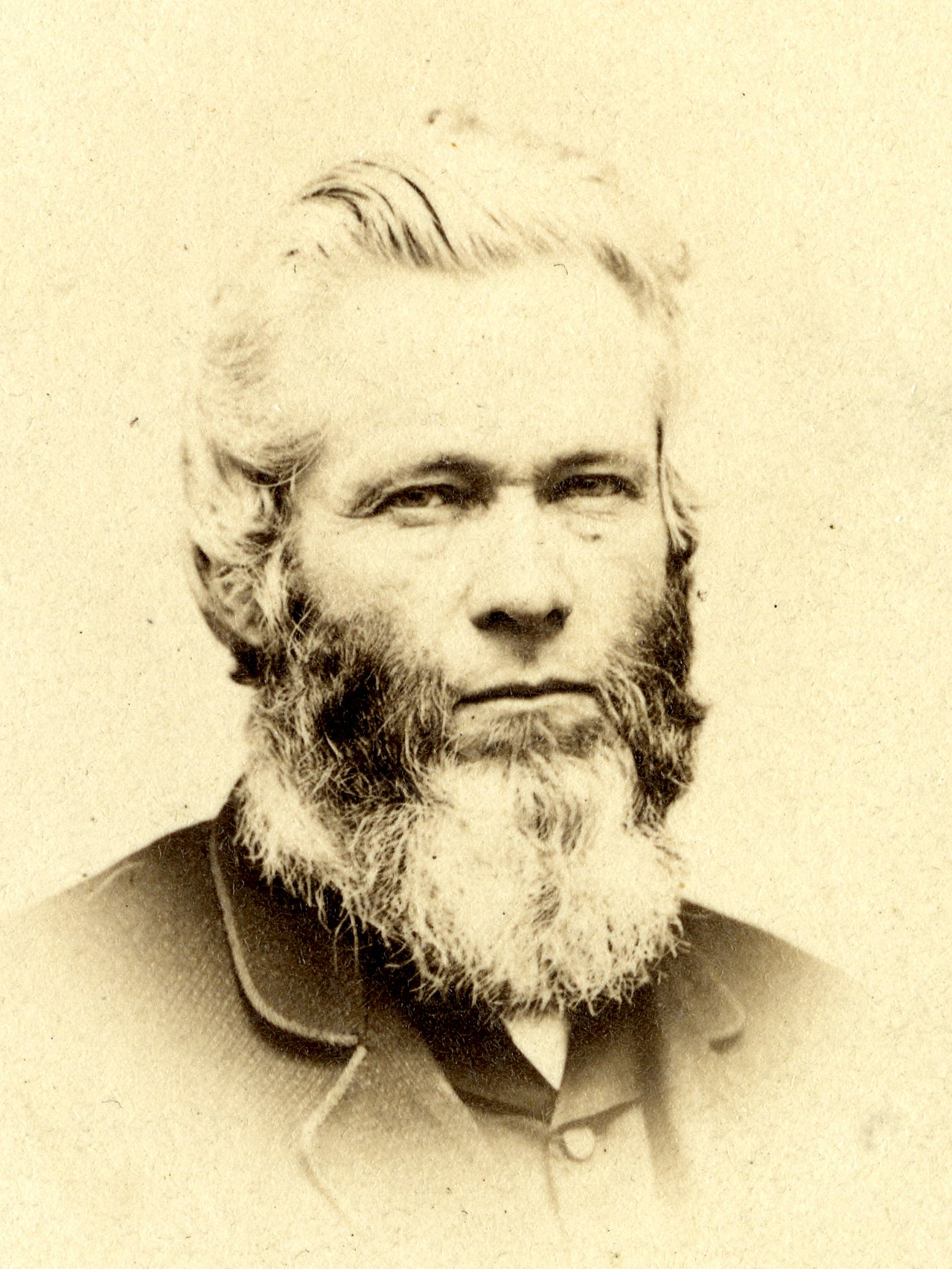
- Clapp, circa 1870

Collector of Internal Revenue for the 4th district of Massachusetts
- In office 1862–1875
- President: Abraham Lincoln; Andrew Johnson; Ulysses S. Grant
- Preceded by: office established

President of the Boston Board of Aldermen
- In office 1860
- Preceded by: Silas Peirce
- Succeeded by: Silas Peirce

Member of the Boston Board of Aldermen
- In office 1860

Member of the Massachusetts House of Representatives
- In office 1854

Member of the Boston Common Council from the 6th ward
- In office 1845–1846

Personal details
- Born: March 3, 1806 Westhampton, Massachusetts
- Died: 18 September 1886 (aged 80) Brookline, Massachusetts
- Resting place: Walnut Hills Cemetery, Brookline, Massachusetts
- Party: Republican
- Spouse(s): Ann Willington Emery Porter (m. 1863; died 1843) Mary Hadley (m. 1844; died 1871)
- Children: 6
- Occupation: Publisher, bookseller, homeopath, pharmacist, politician

Otis Clapp (March 3, 1806 – September 18, 1886) was an American publisher, bookseller, homeopath, pharmacist, and politician who served as a collector of Internal Revenue; a member of the Massachusetts House of Representatives; a member and president of the Boston Board of Aldermen; and a member of the Boston Common Council.

Clapp began his career working in publisher. A believer in the New Church (Swedenborgianism), Clapp ultimately turned his focus in this field to New Church-related works.

A promoter of homeopathy, Clapp operated a large homeopathic pharmacy. This namesake business (Otis Clapp & Son) continued as a business after his death. It was one of the oldest-operating pharmaceutical manufacturers in the United States by the time it was acquired by Medique in 2008. Products continue to be sold by Medique under the brand name "Otis Clapp".

Clapp was a founder of the Massachusetts Institute of Technology.

== Early life and family ==
Clapp was born in Westhampton, Massachusetts on March 3, 1806. Clapp was the son of Elisha Bascom Clapp and Sally Clapp (née Hale).

Clapp's earliest ancestor in the United States was Roger Clapp. His maternal uncle was the Boston journalist Nathan Hale.

== Publishing and bookselling career ==
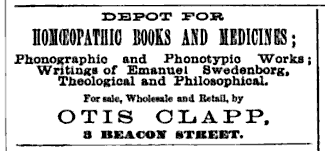
1861 advertisement for Clapp's bookselling and pharmaceuticals

In 1823 (at the age of 17) Clapp moved to Boston and worked under his uncle Nathan Hale in the counting room of Hale's Boston Daily Advertiser. After departing his job at his uncle's newspaper, Clapp himself became the publisher of the New England Galaxy, a short-lived newspaper which ceased publication in 1829. Clapp also became a bookseller and book publisher, co-founding the firm Stimpson & Clapp with Charles Stimpson. This firm published a series of volumes titled "The American Library of Useful Knowledge", as well as the annual "Boston Directory".

After dissolving the Stimpson & Clapp partnership in 1832, Clapp spent several years as a major publisher and distributor of New Church (Swedenborgianism) works,. including books as well as New Jerusalem Magazine from 1832 until 1858 and Children's New Church Magazine from 1843 until 1858. Clapp was himself an believer of the New Church ideology. Clapp also became a strong supporter of homeopathy, and was a prominent publisher of books about homeopathy.

== Career in homeopathic pharmaceutics ==
In 1840, Clapp opened a homeopathic pharmacy in the Back Bay of Boston. At the time it opened, the city had only three or four homeopathic physicians. The pharmacy is considered to have been the United States' second-established homeopathic pharmacy, and the first in the New England region. Initially, its inventory was limited, however as homeopathy grew more popular in New England so too did the pharmacy. To grow, it moved the location of its storefront in both 1841 and 1855. It became one of the world's largest homeopathic pharmacies, and was well-known and long-operating. Clapp manufactured and marketed his own homeopathic medicines.

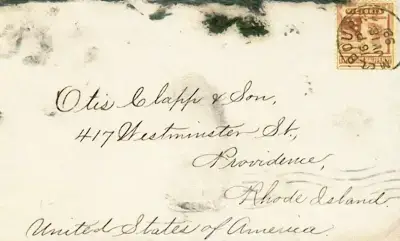
Envelope addressed to Otis Clapp & Son

In the 1870s, his son (Dr. James Wilkinson Clapp) joined as a business partner of the operation, which was renamed "Otis Clapp & Son" in 1874. The business continued to operate long after Clapp's own death. In 2008, the company (by then known as Otis Clapp and Buffington) was acquired by Medique Inc. It was, by that time, one of the oldest operating pharmaceutical manufacturers in the United States. Products continue to be sold by Medique under "Otis Clapp" branding.

== Political and government career ==
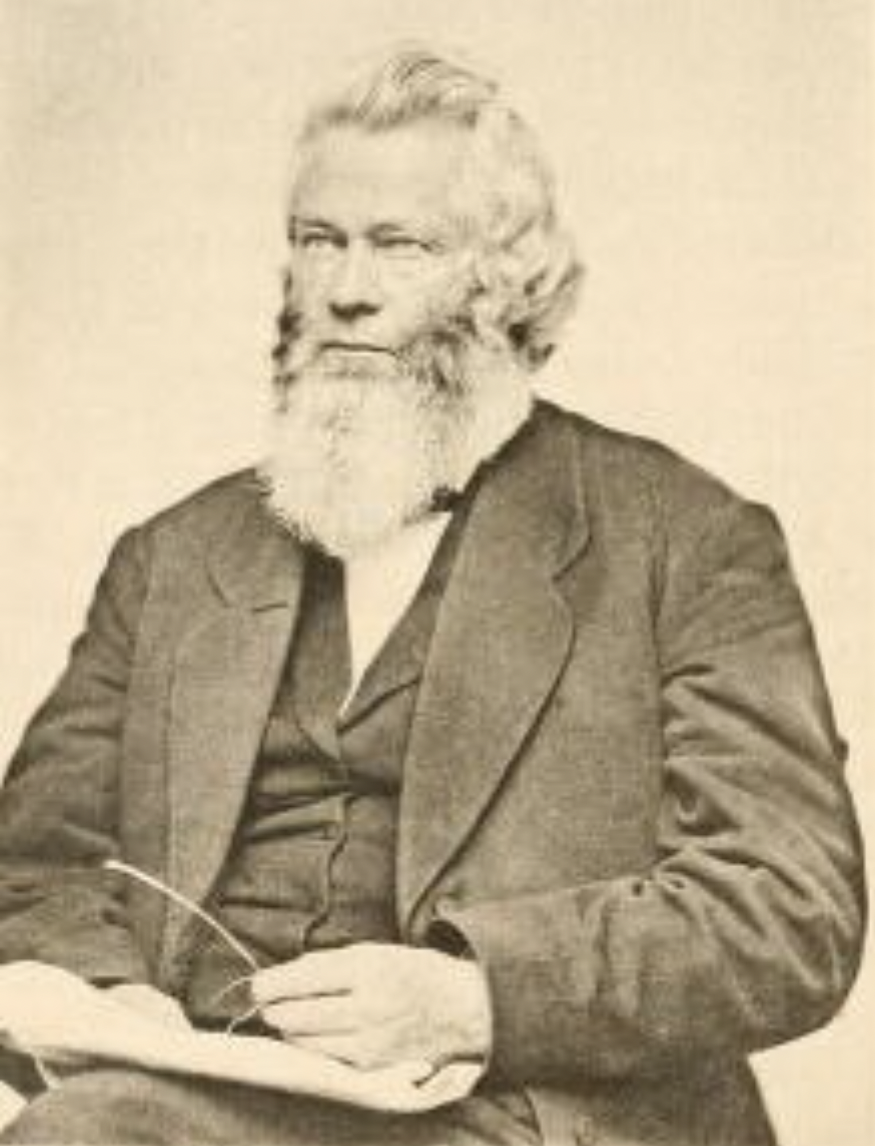
Photograph of Clapp

Clapp served in both chambers of the (then-bicameral) Boston City Council. He first served as a member of the Common Council from the city's sixth ward from 1845 through 1846. In 1860, Clapp served on the Boston Board of Aldermen (the other chamber of the Boston City Council), having been elected as a nominee on the ticket of the Republican Party. During his tenure, he served as the board's president. At times, he acted out the duties of mayor when the mayor left the city. He served on the board's Public Instruction, Public Library, Cemeteries, and Sewers committees. Clapp held a number of other positions in municipal government. During the years in between his tenures in the Boston City Council's chambers, Clapp served a term as a member of the Massachusetts House of Representatives in 1854. He was also appointed by the Common Council in 1859 to serve as the city's assistant assessor for books and publishing.

In 1862, President Abraham Lincoln appointed Clapp as the collector of Internal Revenue for the fourth district of Massachusetts. He served in that office until 1875.

== Other civic involvement ==
Clapp played a significant role in the founding of the Boston Female Medical College. He was also one of the founders of the Massachusetts Institute of Technology.

Clapp was involved on the corporate boards of several railroads. He was also on the boards of several charitable organizations. He served as president of the Washingtonian Home, a role he held at the time of his death. He also was involved with The Home for Little Wanderers.

In some obituaries for Clapp (published in newspapers such as the Brooklyn Eagle), he was described as having been "prominent in many political, social and business reforms."

== Personal life and death ==
On August 29, 1833, Clapp married Ann Willington Emery Porter, daughter of Boston's Sylvanus Porter. She died in 1843. On October 2, 1844, Clapp married Mary Hadley, daughter of Boston's Moses Hadley.. His second wife died in 1871. In 1907, the New England Historic Genealogical Society wrote that he had had six children, three with each of his wives. However, his 1886 obituary in The Boston Globe described him as having fathered eleven children, four of whom had survived him.

Clapp died in Brookline, Massachusetts on September 18, 1886 (at the age of 80). He had been in ill health for the previous year, and had declined greatly in health beginning on July 3 of 1886. He was buried at Walnut Hills Cemetery in Brookline.
