= Rebecca Parker Clarke =

- Born: 1790
- Died: 1865 (aged 74–75)
- Occupations: Religious leader and abolitionist
- Children: James Freeman Clarke

Rebecca Parker Clarke (née Hull) (1790-1865) was an American abolitionist and faith leader in Boston.

== Career ==
She co-founded the Home for Aged Colored Women on Beacon Hill with her son, James Freeman Clarke, and Rev. Leonard A. Grimes of the Twelfth Baptist Church in Boston, Massachusetts, in 1860.

The home was established to provide aid and housing for poor African-American women. The Home for Aged Women, established a decade before, would not admit women of color. This prompted the group of abolitionists to establish a home for women of color.

== Personal life ==
Parker Clarke was married to Samuel Parker Clarke. She also kept a boarding house in Beacon Hill in the 1830s, where she housed figures like Horace Mann and Jared Sparks, among others.

== Legacy ==
In 2023, she was recognized as one of "Boston’s most admired, beloved, and successful Black Women leaders" by the Black Women Lead project.
