= Home for Aged Colored Women =

American charitable organization (1860–1949)

Coordinates: 42.35944°N 71.06560°W

The Home for Aged Colored Women (HACW) was an American charitable organization that provided housing and financial assistance to poor and elderly African American women in Boston, Massachusetts. It was founded in 1860 by an interracial group of abolitionists, including James Freeman Clarke, Rebecca Parker Clarke, Leonard A. Grimes, and John Albion Andrew, and operated until 1949.

== History ==
=== Founding and Mission ===
The Home for Aged Colored Women was founded to provide living accommodations and financial support to poor elderly black women in Boston. Other local organizations that supported poor elderly white women, such as the Home for Aged Women, denied support to African Americans.

The founding of the Home for Aged Colored Women was first discussed by James Freeman Clarke, his mother Rebecca Parker Clarke, Rev. Leonard A. Grimes, and John Albion Andrew, in the vestry of the Twelfth Baptist Church, of which Grimes was pastor. On January 16, 1860, the HACW's subscribers met for the first time and elected the first Board of Managers (later called the board of directors).

In April 1860, ten women, including some formerly enslaved women, began living at the HACW's first residence at 65 Southac Street (now Phillips Street) in Beacon Hill and the West End. In August of the same year, the Home relocated to 27 Myrtle Street. The organization was officially incorporated on March 4, 1864 "for the purpose of providing a home, in the City of Boston, for, or otherwise assisting aged and indigent colored women."

=== Expansion and Resident Life ===
The HACW expanded throughout the latter half of the nineteenth century, and in September 1900, the Home moved to 22 Hancock Street. In addition to residents, the HACW also provided monetary support to other African American women in need. At the organization's peak in 1915, 58 women received monthly financial support from the HACW, and 19 additional women lived at the Home.

Many residents of the Home, referred to as "inmates," were members of the Black community in Beacon Hill, and learned of the HACW through word of mouth. While living in the Home, they were expected to participate in group prayer and housework, and were supervised by the Home's matron. Residents were prohibited from working outside of the Home or selling items they had made.

In 1875, matron Rachel Smith, with approval from organization leadership, allowed residents to sell items to visitors at a fair to raise monety for the Home. The residents sold $327 in goods and each was given fifty cents to keep. The fair then became an annual fundraising event.

Residents, who often had no friends or family, were buried in a mass grave in Dorchester when they died. The graveston read "Home for Aged Colored Women."

=== Closure and Legacy ===
In 1944, the HACW closed its Home due to a decline in the number of residents. The organization continued to provide financial assistance to elderly black women until 1949. According to its website, the Grimes King Foundation for the Elderly considers itself the "successor in interest to the Home for Aged Colored Women."

The location of the Home at 27 Myrtle street is a Boston National Historical Park and a Boston African American National Historic Site.

== See also ==
- History of African Americans in Boston
