= Benjamin Apthorp Gould Fuller =

American philosopher

- Born: March 9, 1879; Brookline, Massachusetts
- Died: March 15, 1956 (aged 77); Taxco, Guerrero, Mexico
- Education: Roxbury Latin School; Harvard University, A.B. (1900), A.M. (1902), Ph.D. (1906); Christ Church (University of Oxford), B.Sc. (1905)
- Occupations: Philosopher; author
- Father: Horace Williams Fuller
- Awards: Order of the Crown of Italy

President of the American Philosophical Association (Pacific Division)
- In office 1940–1941
- Preceded by: Edward Octavius Sisson
- Succeeded by: Ephraim Edward Ericksen

Benjamin Apthorp Gould Fuller (March 9, 1879 – March 15, 1956) was a philosopher, author of A History of Philosophy, and president of the American Philosophical Association. He is also known and published as B.A.G. Fuller.

He was the son of Horace Williams Fuller and Emily Gorham Carter. He studied at Roxbury Latin School in Roxbury, Massachusetts, and received his A.B., A.M., and Ph.D. from Harvard University in 1900, 1902, and 1906, respectively. In 1902 he matriculated at Christ Church, Oxford, and received his B.Sc. in 1905. His Ph.D. thesis on "The Problem of Evil in Plotinus" was published in 1912. He was described as "a representative of Epicureanism at its best."

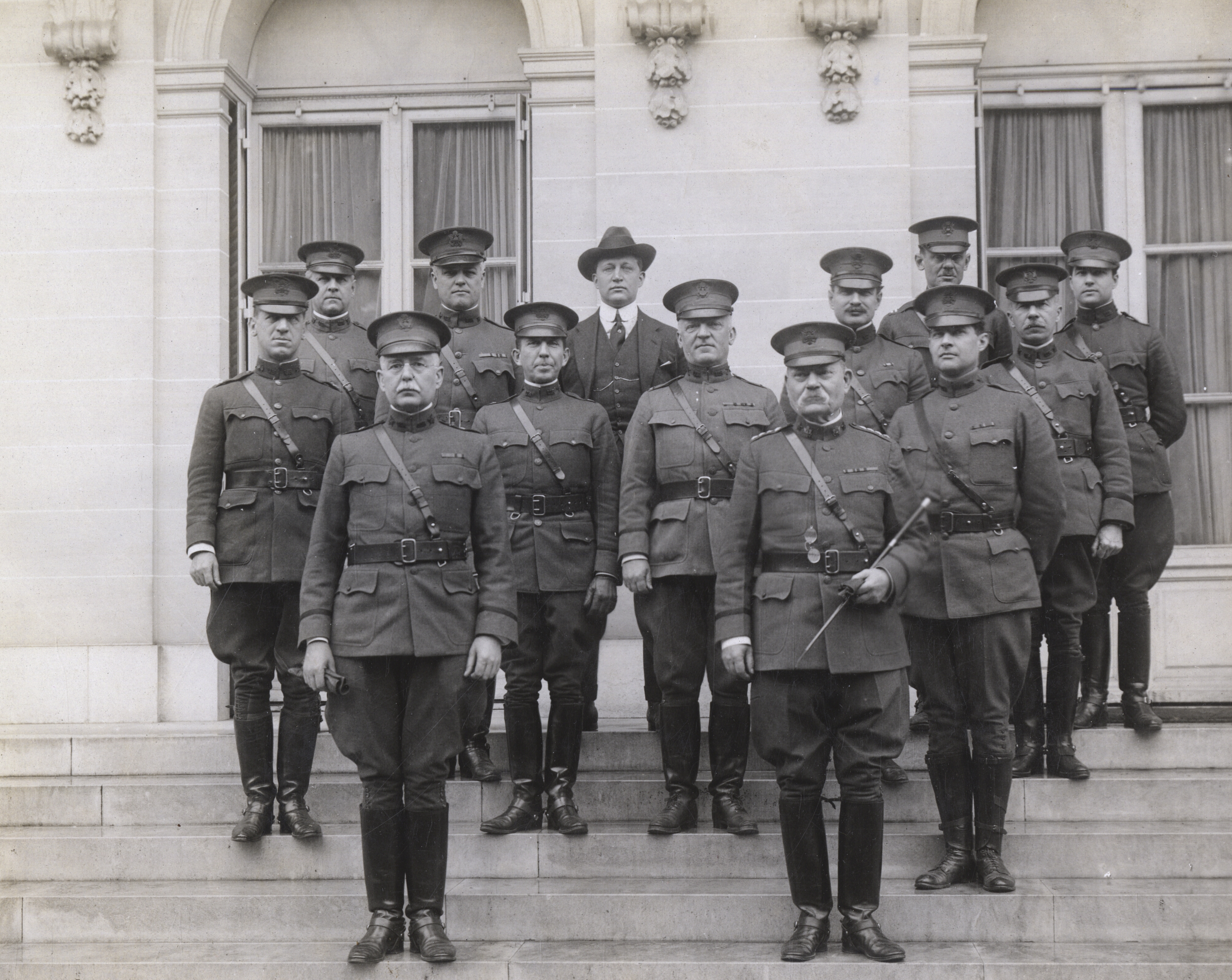
The Allied War Council at the home of General Tasker H. Bliss at Versailles, France, May 1918. Captain B. A. G. Fuller is stood in the fourth row, second from the left.

Fuller taught philosophy at Harvard from 1906 to 1910. In 1910 he traveled around the world, visiting Kashmir, northern and central India, Assam, Burma, Java, and Japan, developing "the habit of never taking a ticket further than the next stop, and came to the realization that life is much too short to hurry."

He was commissioned as an infantry captain in the United States Army during World War I and served from 1917 to 1919. During this time, he was assigned to the staff of General Tasker H. Bliss in the American Section of the Supreme War Council at Versailles from January 1918 to June 1919. He was awarded the Ordine della Corona d'Italia.

In 1923 Henry Holt & Co. published his History of Greek Philosophy, Thales to Democritus.

He was a professor and fellow at the Graduate School of the University of Cincinnati, where he began teaching in 1924. He was subsequently a professor of philosophy at the University of Southern California from 1933 to 1941.

Fuller maintained a home in the Hollywood Heights neighborhood of Los Angeles from 1932 until his death. The house is a Los Angeles Historic-Cultural Monument. He is buried in Taxco, Mexico, where he had a winter home.
