= Gone From My Sight =

1904 poem

"Gone From My Sight", also known as the "Parable of Immortality" and "What Is Dying", is a poem (or prose poem) presumably written by the Rev. Luther F. Beecher (1813–1903), cousin of Henry Ward Beecher and Harriet Beecher Stowe.

At least three publications credit the poem to Luther Beecher in printings shortly after his death in 1904.

However, it is often attributed to Henry Van Dyke, probably due to his name appearing as the author in a widely distributed booklet by award winning end of life educator Barbara Karnes, RN entitled "Gone from My Sight: The Dying Experience." This "little blue book" is the original, and remains the most widely used, patient/family educational booklet on the signs of approaching death. It has been in print continuously since 1985 and has sold over 40 million copies. Hospice and Home Health agencies distribute this booklet to educate families of patients nearing the end of life. It is also often read at funerals and memorial services.

== Poem ==
I am standing upon the seashore. A ship at my side spreads her white sails to the morning breeze, and starts for the blue ocean. She is an object of beauty and strength, and I stand and watch her until she hangs like a speck of white cloud just where the sea and sky come down to meet and mingle with each other. Then someone at my side says: “There! She’s gone!” Gone where? Gone from my sight—that is all. She is just as large in mast and hull and spar as she was when she left my side, and just as able to bear her load of living freight to the place of her destination. Her diminished size is in me and not in her.

And just at that moment when someone at my side says: “There! She’s gone!” there are other eyes that are watching for her coming; and other voices ready to take up the glad shout: “Here she comes!”
