= The Green Bag (1889–1914) =

Lighthearted American legal magazine

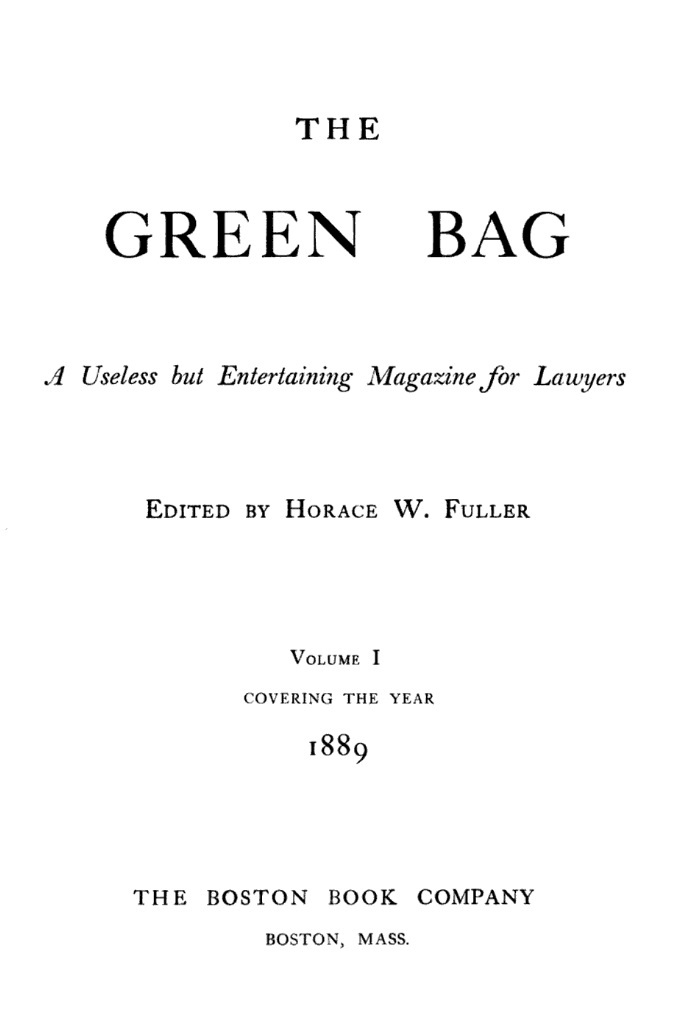
- First volume frontispiece
- Editors: Horace Williams Fuller; Thomas Tileston Baldwin; Sydney Russell Wrightington; Arthur Weightman Spencer
- Founder: Charles Carroll Soule
- First issue: 1889
- Final issue: 1914
- Country: United States
- Based in: Boston, Massachusetts

The Green Bag was a popular legal magazine published in Boston between 1889 and 1914—the Progressive Era—containing news of legal events, biographies, and essays, generally in a lighthearted tone. The magazine was initially captioned "A Useless, but Entertaining Magazine For Lawyers"; later "An Entertaining Magazine for Lawyers". The name of the magazine was purported to reflect the use of green bags by barristers, although this assertion was disputed.

Charles Carroll Soule, owner of the Boston Book Company and publisher of The Green Bag, hired Horace Williams Fuller to be the first editor. A contemporary publication reviewed the initial efforts of The Green Bag as follows: "Although primarily intended for the amusement of lawyers, this magazine should be a welcome guest at any library table. It is certainly one of the brightest, sprightliest and most entertaining of all the non-scientific journals that come to The Microscope's book-table. Well edited, beautifully printed, finely illustrated, it should meet with a cordial reception from any intelligent reader."

In 1893, A. Oakey Hall began writing "reflective and authoritative essays on legal matters and some biographical sketches of famous people" for The Green Bag, including biographies of Samuel J. Tilden, William McKinley, William Jennings Bryan, and Alexander Hamilton. The success of The Green Bag prompted an imitator, The Canadian Green Bag, launched in January 1895 and edited by Francis Longueville Snow.

Fuller served as editor of The Green Bag until the end of 1900, some months before his death in 1901. Following Fuller's retirement, Thomas Tileston Baldwin became editor, and was evaluated by one reviewer as "a worthy successor to Mr. Fuller judging from his initial number." Baldwin served as editor from 1901 to 1904, giving up editorship in January 1905. During this time, the magazine's offerings included a series of articles contributed by David Werner Amram, which formed the substance of his 1905 book, Leading Cases in the Bible. In these, Amram approached the Bible in a spirit of free scientific inquiry and illuminated the legal problems involved even indirectly in the biblical narrative. The striking originality and charming style of the book was of interest to students of both the law and the Bible.

Editorship passed to Sydney Russell Wrightington from 1905 to 1909, then to Arthur Weightman Spencer from 1909 to 1915. At the beginning of 1915, The Green Bag was acquired by the Central Law Journal Company, which discontinued The Green Bag while fulfilling its subscription list with its own weekly Central Law Journal. Spencer, then-editor of The Green Bag, became assistant editor of The Central Law Journal.

In 1997, three former classmates at the University of Chicago Law School began publication of The Green Bag: An Entertaining Journal of Law as a quarterly legal journal dedicated to publishing good writing about the law. In calling itself an "entertaining" journal, it is not strictly a journal of humor and unserious work.
