= Horace Williams Fuller =

American lawyer and magazine editor (1844–1901)

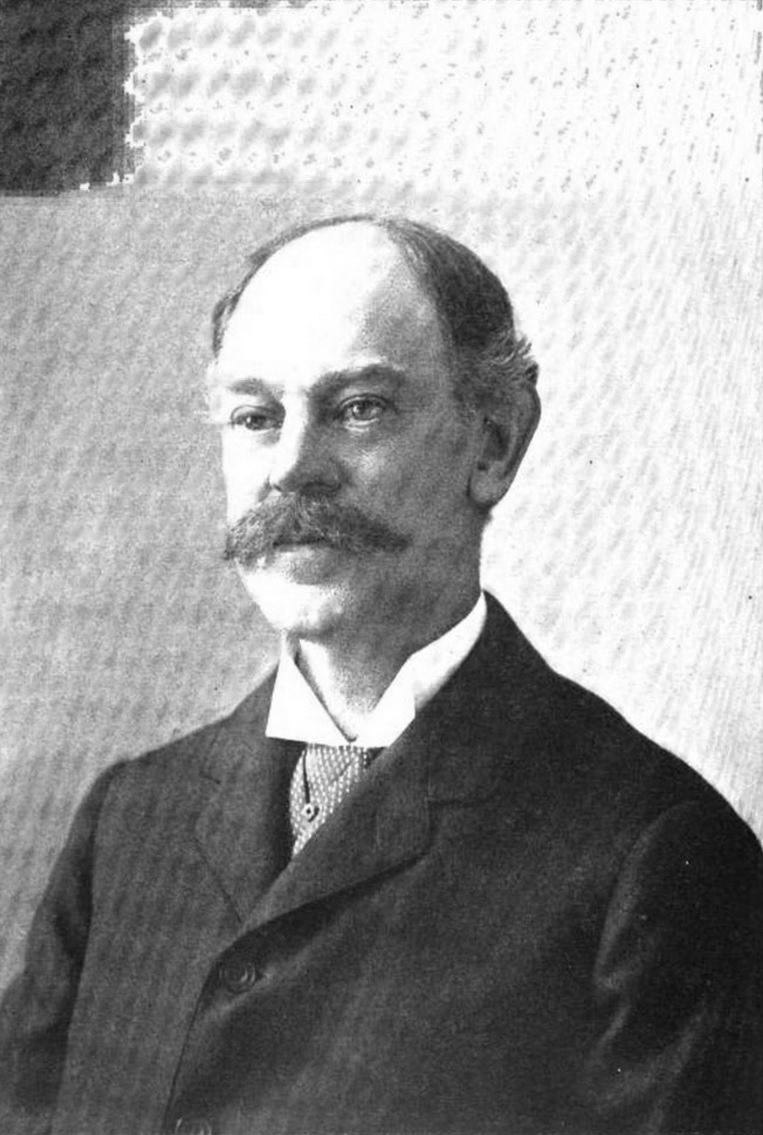
- Born: June 15, 1844; Augusta, Maine
- Died: October 26, 1901 (aged 57); Brookline, Massachusetts
- Burial place: Walnut Hills Cemetery
- Education: Phillips Exeter Academy
- Occupations: Lawyer; editor
- Known for: First editor of The Green Bag
- Spouse: Emily Gorham Carter (m. 1877)
- Children: Benjamin Apthorp Gould Fuller
- Relatives: Melville Fuller (cousin)

Horace Williams Fuller (June 15, 1844 – October 26, 1901) was an American lawyer and editor who served as the first editor of The Green Bag, a late-19th- and early-20th century legal news and humor magazine.

== Life and career ==
Born in Augusta, Maine, his father was Benjamin Apthorp Gould Fuller, by profession a lawyer, who was for several years on the bench, and his grandfather was also a lawyer. His mother's maiden name was Harriet Seiden Williams. After getting an education at the Augusta High School and Phillips Exeter Academy, Fuller came to Boston in 1861, and for several years devoted himself to business, beginning as a clerk in the office of Page, Richardson & Company.

The legal instincts of the family prevailed—Melville Fuller, the Chief Justice of the United States, was his cousin—and after reading law in the office of Henry W. Paine, and taking a course of instruction at the Boston University Law School, he was admitted to the Suffolk bar in 1876. He never appeared much in the courts, his business—so long as he continued to follow it—being mainly office practice and trusts. In 1877, he married Emily Gorham Carter, of Roxbury, and shortly afterwards made his home in Brookline, Massachusetts, where he thereafter resided.

Although Fuller never took a university course, he was such a constant student throughout his life that he attained a culture so broad and thorough that many readers were surprised to learn that he did not hold a college degree. He had an especial fondness for French literature, writing in his leisure hours, and contributing anonymously to magazines and the press, spirited translations from that language. His only acknowledged work in this line was a small volume entitled Noted French Trials, Impostors and Adventurers, published in 1882.

=== The Green Bag ===
When The Green Bag was projected, its publishers, knowing Fuller's literary aptitudes, offered him the position of editor, which was accepted. Fuller threw himself into his new duties with vigor, and for many years was not only editor, but also, to a great extent, business manager. Although he relinquished the latter part of his duties after the first few years he kept up the literary portion with unflagging devotion, producing the 12 bound volumes of The Green Bag, from 1889 to 1901.

His editorial work not only made him known to the legal profession, but its incidental correspondence brought him into direct touch with many leading lawyers throughout the United States. For several years he was an active member of the American Bar Association. At its annual gatherings he had the opportunity of meeting the men who already knew him by reputation, or through exchange of letters, and who welcomed him cordially as a friend at first sight. Fuller never held office or took an active role in party politics. He felt, however, a keen interest in public affairs, and was always ready to give encouragement and effective personal work to what may be called conscience issues like civil service reform.

== Personal life ==
Fuller also enjoyed participating in amateur theatre, specializing in character parts, in which he excelled—both in humorous characters and in those requiring pathos and delicate shades of acting. For many years he devoted much time and energy to the duties of manager of the Brookline Comedy Club, a position requiring peculiar tact and patience.

Fuller belonged to several clubs, including the St. Botolph Club, where he attended Sunday afternoon musicales, and Brookline Country Club, where he played golf. He also played whist with neighbors and spent evenings at home with his wife, sons, and friends.

When Fuller gave up the editorial charge of The Green Bag at the end of 1900, he appeared to be in excellent health. However, on the morning of October 25, 1901, Fuller was stricken with apoplexy, and after lingering unconscious for a day, he died October 26, 1901, in Brookline, Massachusetts, and was laid at rest two days later at Walnut Hills Cemetery.

His son was Benjamin Apthorp Gould Fuller (1879–1956), author of A History of Philosophy and president of the American Philosophical Association.
