= Hillside =

Hillside may refer to the side of a hill.

== Places ==
=== Australia ===
- Hillside mine, a proposed mine on the Yorke Peninsula, South Australia
- Hillside, New South Wales
- Hillside, Victoria, a suburb of Melbourne

=== Canada ===
- Hillside, Nova Scotia

=== United Kingdom ===
- Hillside, Merseyside, a suburb of Southport
  - Hillside railway station, the railway station serving Hillside, Merseyside
- Hillside, Angus, Scotland
- Hillside (Merton ward), a ward in London

=== United States ===
- Hillside, Colorado
- Hillside, Illinois
- Hillside, Indianapolis, Indiana
- Hillside, New Jersey
- Hillside, New York
- Hillside, Wisconsin
- Hillside, Portland, Oregon, a neighborhood in Northwest Portland

=== Zimbabwe ===
- Hillside, Harare

=== Fictional locations ===
- Hillside, a fictional house, and the main setting, in Sleeping Murder

== Historic buildings ==
=== Australia ===
- Hillside, Warwick, Queensland

=== United Kingdom ===
- Hillside, Brighton and Hove

=== United States ===
- Hillside (Norfolk, Connecticut)
- Hillside (Davenport, Iowa)
- Hillside (Plymouth, Massachusetts)
- Hillside (Natchez, Mississippi)
- Hillside (Greensboro, North Carolina)
- Hillside (Carlisle, South Carolina)
- Hillside (Charles Town, West Virginia)

== Entertainment ==
- Hillside (TV series)
- "Hillside", a song by E-40 from his 2011 album Revenue Retrievin': Overtime Shift

== See also ==
- Hillside Animal Sanctuary, UK
- Hillside Cemetery (disambiguation)
- Hillside Engineering, Dunedin, New Zealand
- Hillside Festival, a summer festival in Guelph, Ontario, Canada
- Hillside Historic District (disambiguation)
- Hillside School (disambiguation)
