= List of burials at Mount Auburn Cemetery =

Mount Auburn Cemetery is a historic, "garden-style" burial ground in Boston, Massachusetts, United States. It is located between Cambridge and Watertown, and was dedicated in 1831. The 174-acre (70 ha) grounds has long been the preferred burial ground for the middle class and elite of New England.

This list highlights its notable internees, though many others are contained within the large and scenic grounds.

There is an important instance in which burial at Mt, Auburn was proposed, but did not happen: the abolitionist John Brown, executed by Virginia in 1859. His friend Wendell Phillips, meeting the funeral party in Troy, New York, hoped to take the body to Boston for burial in Mount Auburn Cemetery, as Charles Turner Torrey had been. An impromptu announcement said this was not going to happen, since Brown had wanted to be buried at his farm in North Elba, New York. Phillips, speaking at the funeral, "intimated that Massachusetts would yet possess the remains of John Brown."

In the 2nd half of the 19th century, The Ladies' Repository magazine published a series of brief articles on "The Distinguished Dead of Mt. Auburn", six in 1870.

.

== A ==
- Hannah Adams (1755–1831), author
- Elizabeth Cary Agassiz (1822–1907), scientist, author
- Louis Agassiz (1807–1873), scientist
- Thomas Bailey Aldrich (1836–1907), author
- George Thorndike Angell (1823–1909), advocate for the humane treatment of animals, founder of the Massachusetts Society for the Prevention of Cruelty to Animals
- Nathan Appleton (1779–1861), congressman
- William Appleton (1786–1862), congressman
- Thomas F. August (1926–2005), attorney and politician who served as the 31st Mayor of Somerville, Massachusetts

== B ==
- Hosea Ballou (1771–1852), Universalist theologian and minister
- Stanisław Barańczak (1946–2014), Polish poet and translator
- John Bartlett (1820–1905), Writer and publisher of Bartlett's Familiar Quotations
- Benjamin E. Bates (1808–1878), industrialist, benefactor of Bates College
- Jonathan Bayliss (1926–2009), Gloucester (Mass.) novelist and playwright
- Jeremy Belknap (1744–1798), clergyman and historian
- Bertha Isabelle Barker (1868 - 1963), bacteriologist at Rockefeller Institute for Medical Research studied tuberculosis.
- Jacob Bigelow (1787–1879), designer of Mt. Auburn Cemetery
- J. W. Black (1825–1896), photographer
- James Henry Blake (1845–1941), zoologist and scientific illustrator
- Edwin Booth (1833–1893), actor
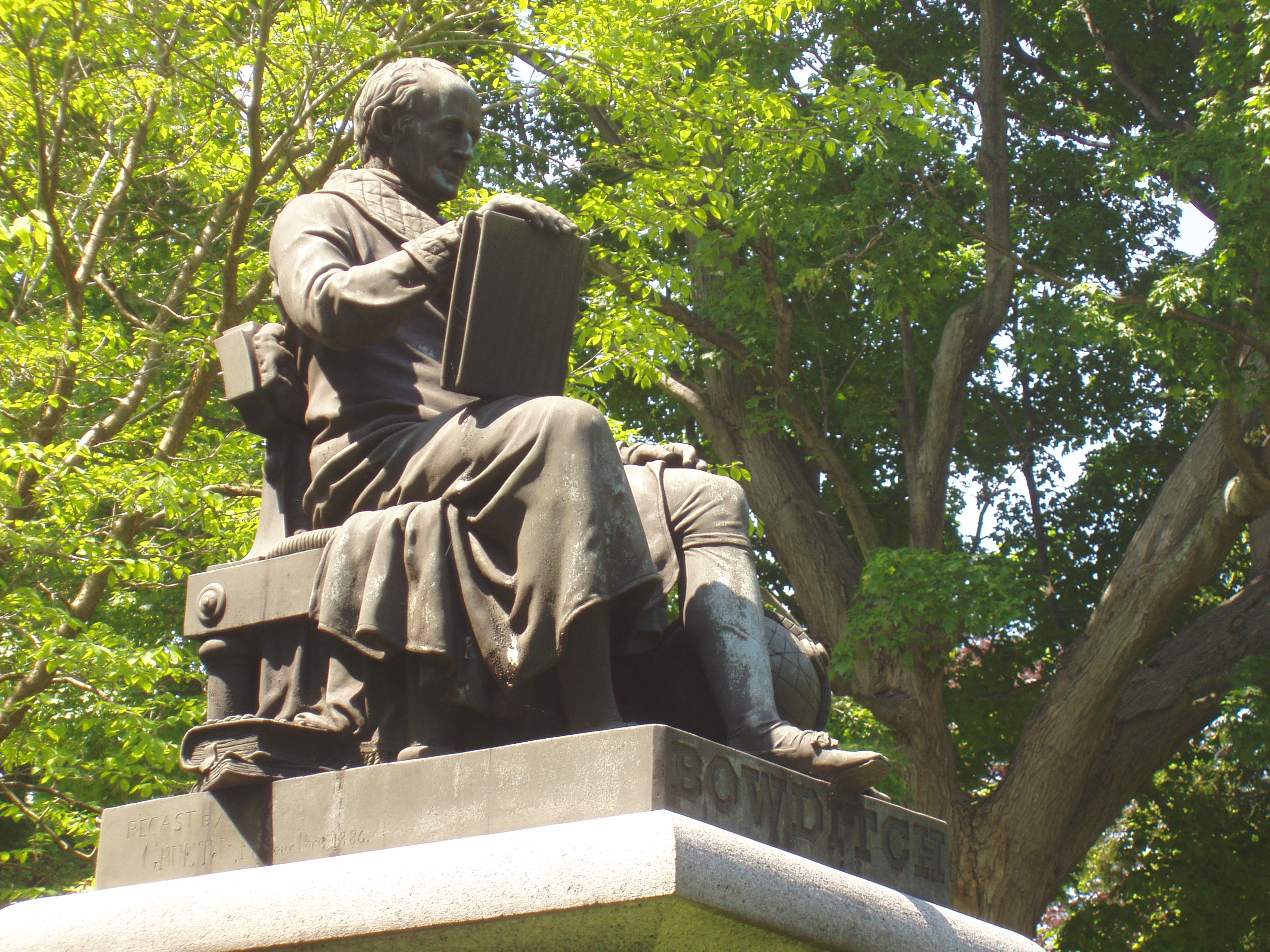
  Nathaniel Bowditch
- Edwin Boring (1886–1968), psychologist
- Nathaniel Bowditch (1773–1838), mathematician, seaman, author; his monument was the first life size bronze to be cast in America
- Ada Chastina Bowles (1836–1928), Universalist minister.
- William Brewster (1851–1919), ornithologist
- Peter Bent Brigham (1807–1877), Boston businessman and philanthropist
- Phillips Brooks (1835–1893), American Episcopal bishop
- Caroline Lamson Brown (1852-1928), Titanic survivor
- Roger Brown (1925–1997), American social psychologist, buried together with his partner Albert Gilman
- Charles Bulfinch (1763–1844), architect
- McGeorge Bundy (1919–1996), presidential cabinet official
- Anson Burlingame (1820–1870), lawyer, legislator, diplomat

== C ==
- George Cabot (1752–1823), statesman
- Mary Whiton Calkins (1863–1930), psychologist and philosopher
- James Henry Carleton (1814–1873), United States Army officer
- William Ellery Channing (1780–1842), Unitarian theologian
- Stanley Cavell (1926–2018), philosopher
- Joyce Chen (1917–1994), chef
- Linus Child (1802–1870), lawyer and politician
- Rufus Choate (1799–1859), lawyer, Massachusetts legislator and U.S. Senator
- John Ciardi (1916–1986), poet, translator
- Alvan Clark (1804–1887), astronomer and telescope maker
- John M. Clark (1821–1902), sheriff of Suffolk County
- Nancy Talbot Clark (1825–1901), physician
- James B. Conant (1893–1978), president of Harvard University
- Sherman Conant (1839–1890), Union major and 9th Florida Attorney General
- Richard David Cowan (1909–1939), buried together with his partner Stewart Mitchell, intimate of Gerald and Sara Murphy
- Christopher Pearse Cranch (1813–1892)), Transcendentalist writer and artist
- Robert Creeley (1926–2005), poet
- Benjamin Williams Crowninshield (1772–1851), statesman, U.S. Secretary of the Navy
- Frank Crowninshield (1872–1947), creator and editor of Vanity Fair magazine
- Benjamin Robbins Curtis (1809–1874), United States Supreme Court justice
- Charlotte Cushman (1816–1876), actress

== D ==
- Felix Octavius Carr Darley (1821–1888), artist
- Frederick B. Deknatel (1905–1973), art historian
- Charles Devens (1820–1891), jurist and Union general
- Samuel Dexter (1761–1816), congressman
- Dorothea Dix (1802–1887), nurse, hospital reformer
- George Dorr (1853–1944), preservationist, founder of today's Acadia National Park
- Mildred Dresselhaus (1930–2017), physicist
- Julia Knowlton Dyer (1829–1907), philanthropist

== E ==
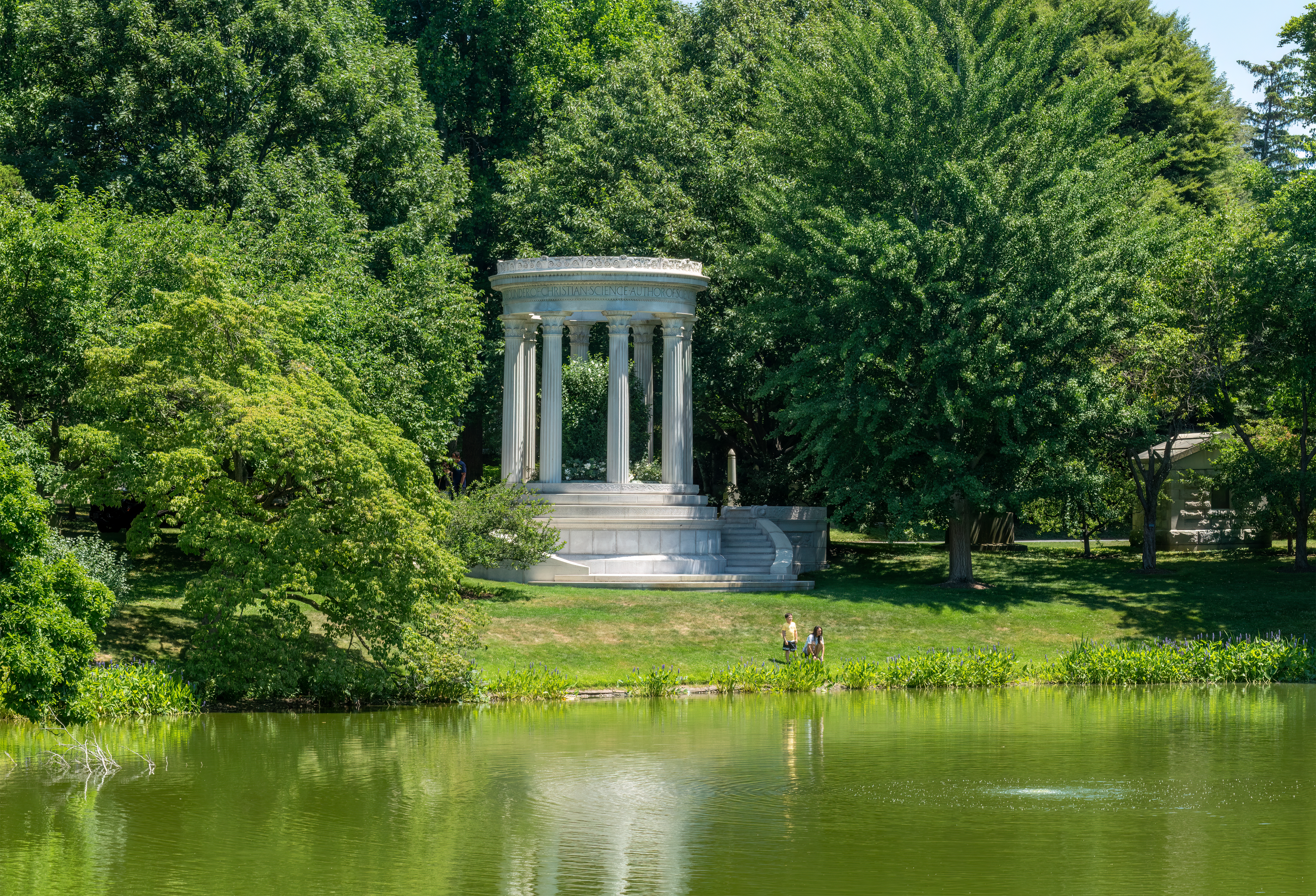
Mary Baker Eddy Memorial

- Mary Baker Eddy (1821–1910), religious leader
- Harold "Doc" Edgerton (1903–1990), engineer, scientist
- Charles William Eliot (1834–1926), Harvard University president
- Martha May Eliot (1891–1978), foremost pediatrician and specialist in public health
- Abraham Eustis (1786–1843), lawyer and U.S. Army officer, first commander of Fort Monroe.
- Elizabeth M. Eustis (1858-1936), Titanic survivor
- Edward Everett (1794–1865), Governor of Massachusetts, President of Harvard University, United States Secretary of State, speaker at the dedication of the Soldiers' National Cemetery in Gettysburg, Pennsylvania.
- William Everett (1839–1910), congressman

== F ==
- Nina Fagnani (1856–1928), American-born French painter of portrait miniatures
- Achilles Fang (1910–1995), sinologist, comparatist, and friend of Ezra Pound
- Fannie Farmer (1857–1915), cookbook author
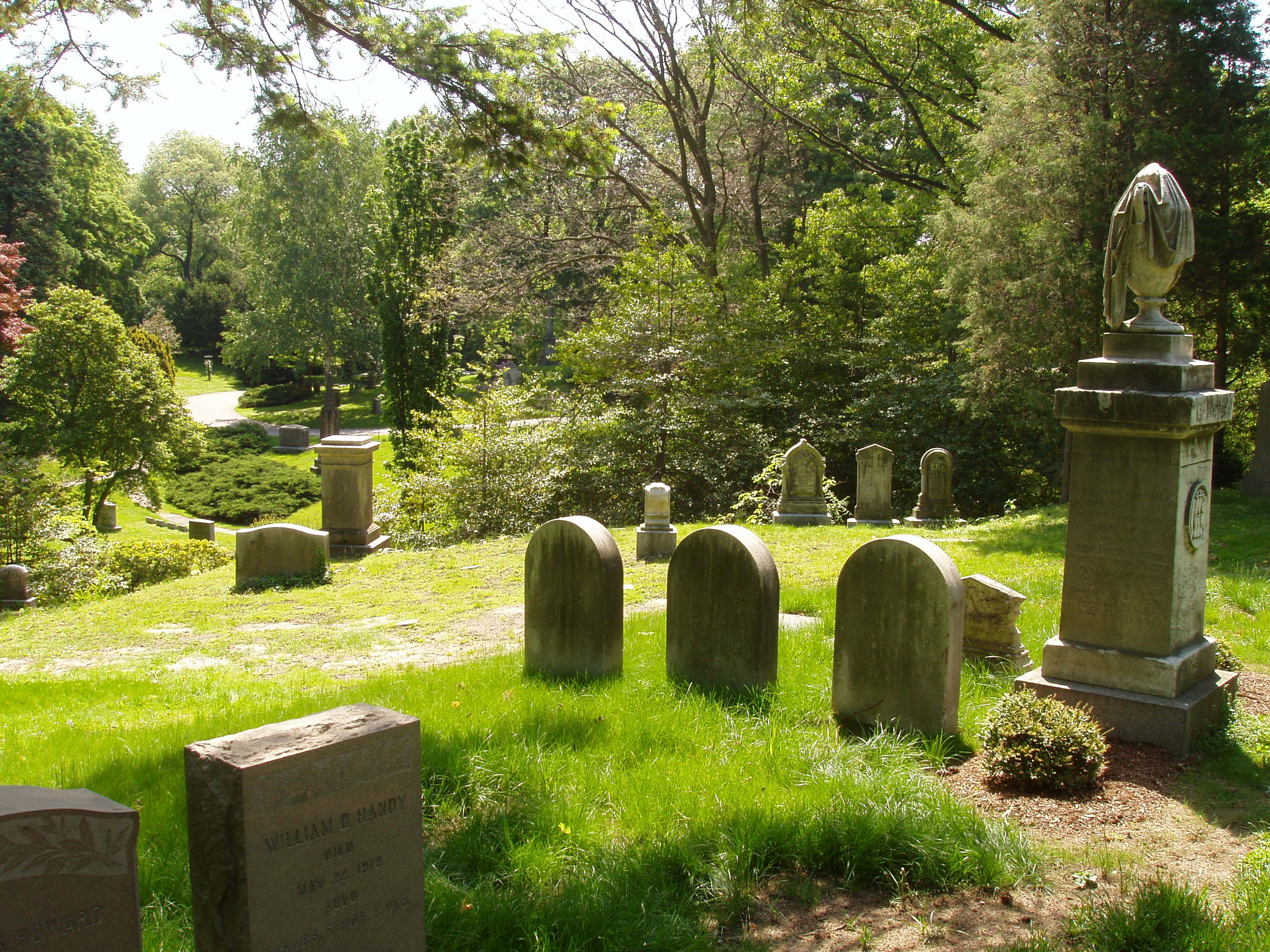
  Mount Auburn Cemetery
- Cornelius Conway Felton (1807–1862), American educator
- Fanny Fern (1811–1872), feminist author
- Annie Adams Fields (1834–1915), author and hostess; wife of James Thomas Fields
- James T. Fields (1817–1881), writer and publisher
- Williamina Fleming (1857−1911), astronomer
- William M. Folger (1844–1928), United States Navy rear admiral and grandson of Mayhew Folger
- Arthur Foote (1853–1937), composer
- George L. Fox (1825–1877), comedian
- Felix Frankfurter (1882–1965), United States Supreme Court Justice
- Buckminster Fuller (1895–1983), architect
- Margaret Fuller (1810–1850), writer, critic, and women's rights advocate; her body was lost in a shipwreck but a monument was erected to her memory in the Fuller family plot

== G ==
- Isabella Stewart Gardner (1840–1924), art collector, museum founder
- Charles Dana Gibson (1867–1944), illustrator
- Charles Hammond Gibson Jr (1874–1954), philanthropist and art collector
- Albert Gilman (d. 1989), Shakespeare scholar and professor of English at Boston University, buried together with his partner Roger Brown
- Archibald R. Giroux (1897–1968), president of the Boston Stock Exchange and chairman of the Massachusetts Republican Party
- Augustus Addison Gould (1805–1866), conchologist and malacologist
- Curt Gowdy (1919–2006), sportscaster
- Asa Gray (1810–1888), 19th century American botanist
- Horace Gray (1828–1902), United States Supreme Court justice
- James Monroe Gregory (1849–1915), Howard University Dean
- Ludlow Griscom (1890–1959), field ornithologist
- Horatio Greenough (1805–1852), sculptor

== H ==
- Charles Hale (1831–1882), journalist, statesman
- Mary Whitwell Hale (1810–1862), teacher hymnwriter
- Morris Halle (1923–2018), linguist
- Benjamin F. Hallett (1797–1862), American lawyer and politician, (first) Chairman of the Democratic National Committee (1848–1852)
- Edward Needles Hallowell (1836–1871), Union Army officer
- George W. Hammond (1833–1908), businessman
- Charles Hayden (1870–1937), financier and philanthropist
- George Hayward (1791–1863), surgeon and Harvard professor
- George Stillman Hillard (1808–1879), author, lawyer, legislator
- Oliver Wendell Holmes Sr. (1809–1894), physician/author
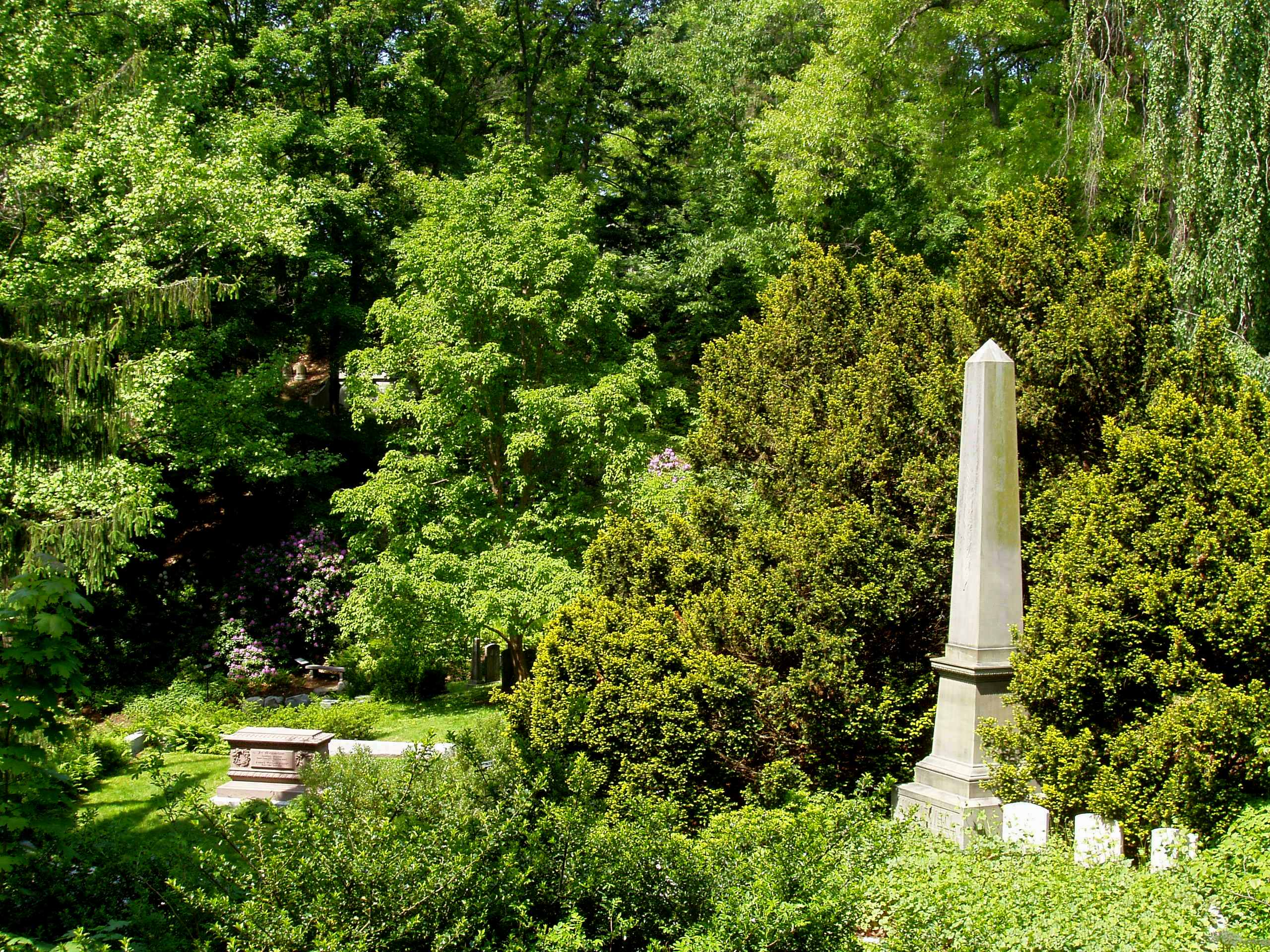
  Hunnewell family obelisk
- Winslow Homer (1836–1910), artist
- Harriet Hosmer (1830–1908), first female professional sculptor
- Albion P. Howe (1818–1897), Union army general
- George Howe (1886–1955), architect
- Julia Ward Howe (1819–1910), activist, poet, and author of "Battle Hymn of the Republic"
- Samuel Gridley Howe (1801–1876), physician, abolitionist, and advocate of education for the blind
- Horatio Hollis Hunnewell (1810–1902), banker, railroad financier, philanthropist, amateur botanist
- Harriot Kezia Hunt (1805–1875), early female physician; her monument, a statue of Hygieia, was carved by Edmonia Lewis

== J ==
- Harriet Ann Jacobs (1813–1897), escaped slave and author of Incidents in the Life of a Slave Girl
- Sarah S. Jacobs (1813–1902), writer and civic worker
- Roman Jakobson (1896–1982), Russian linguist
- Melvin Johnson (1909–1965), lawyer, Marine officer, and firearms designer
- Edward F. Jones (1828–1913), New York lieutenant governor 1886–1891

== K ==
- Michael Kelly (1957–2003), journalist, writer, columnist, and editor
- Edward Kent (1802–1877), governor of Maine
- György Kepes (1906–2001), painter, photographer, designer, educator, and art theorist
- Juliet Kepes (1919–1999), illustrator, painter and sculptor

== L ==
- Edwin H. Land (1909–1991), scientistand inventor of the Polaroid Land Camera
- Christopher Columbus Langdell (1826–1906), legal educator
- Abbott Lawrence (1792–1855), politician, philanthropist
- Missy LeHand (1896–1944), private secretary to Franklin Roosevelt
- Henry Cabot Lodge (1850–1924), politician
- Henry Cabot Lodge Jr. (1902–1985), politician
- Henry Wadsworth Longfellow (1807–1882), poet
- Charles Greely Loring III (1881–1966), architect based in Boston, son of the Civil War general
- Charles Greely Loring Jr. (1828–1902), Union Army general during the Civil War, later director of Boston's Museum of Fine Arts
- Charles Greely Loring Sr. (1794–1867), lawyer and politician based in Boston, father of the Civil War general
- Katharine Peabody Loring (1849–1943), educator and long-time companion of Alice James
- A. Lawrence Lowell (1856–1943), Harvard University president
- Amy Lowell (1874–1925), poet
- Charles Russell Lowell (1835–1864), Civil War general and casualty of the Battle of Cedar Creek
- Francis Cabot Lowell (1855–1911), U.S. congressman and Federal judge
- James Russell Lowell (1819–1891), poet and foreign diplomat
- Josephine Shaw Lowell (1843–1905), wife of Gen. Charles Russell Lowell, sister of Col. Robert Gould Shaw
- Maria White Lowell (1821–1853), poet and wife of James Russell Lowell

== M ==
- Tom Magliozzi (1935–2014), auto mechanic and radio personality
- Bernard Malamud (1914–1986), writer
- Abby Adeline Manning (1836–1906), artist, buried together with her companion, Anne Whitney
- Jules Marcou (1824–1898), geologist
- Brian G. Marsden (1937–2010), astronomer
- Abraham Maslow (1908–1970), psychologist who created Maslow's hierarchy of needs
- Fanny Peabody Mason (1864–1948), heiress, philanthropist of the arts
- Jonathan Mason (politician) (1756–1831), politician, United States senator
- Augustus P. Martin (1835–1902), American politician and Union artillerist during the Civil War
- Isaac McLellan (1806–1899), author and poet
- William McMasters (1874–1968), journalist and publicist who exposed Charles Ponzi as a fraudster
- Susan Minns (1839—1938), American biologist, philanthropist, and collector
- Stewart Mitchell (1892–1957), American poet, editor, and professor of English literature, buried together with his partner, Richard David Cowan
- Franklin B. Morse (1873–1929), football player and journalist
- Leopold Morse (1831–1893), United States House of Representatives (five terms)
- William T.G. Morton (1819–1868), demonstrator of ether anesthesia & his son William J. Morton, a noted doctor
- Stephen P. Mugar (1901–1982), Armenian-American philanthropist and founder of the Star Market chain of supermarkets; father of David Mugar
- Harvey M. Munsell (1843–1913, American Union soldier, recipient of the Medal of Honor
- Joseph B. Murdock (1851–1931), United States Navy rear admiral who served as commander-in-chief of the United States Asiatic Fleet and as a member of the New Hampshire House of Representatives
- John Murray (1741–1815), founder of the Universalist Church in America

== N ==
- Shahan Natalie (1884–1983), principal organizer of Operation Nemesis, Armenian national philosophy writer
- Arthur Webster Newell (1854–1912), president of Fourth National Bank in Boston, who died in Titanic disaster
- Madeleine Newell (1880–1969), Titanic survivor
- Rose Standish Nichols (1872–1960), landscape architect
- Charles Eliot Norton (1827–1908), scholar and author
- Richard Norton (1872–1918), professor of archaeology, organizer of the American Volunteer Motor Ambulance Corps
- Elliot Norton (1903–2003), Boston theater critic
- Robert Nozick (1938–2002), philosopher

== O ==
- Richard Olney (1835–1917), statesman
- Joseph Wallace Oman (1864–1941), admiral and governor of US Virgin Islands
- Frances Sargent Osgood (1811–1850), poet
- Harrison Gray Otis (1765–1848), U.S. representative, mayor of Boston
- Laurence R. Owen (1944–1961), U.S. ladies skating champion
- Maribel Y. Owen (1940–1961), U.S. pairs figure skating champion

== P ==
- Francis Winthrop Palfrey (1831–1889), American historian and Civil War officer
- John G. Palfrey (1796–1881), American clergyman and historian
- Thomas Fyshe Palmer (1747–1802), English Unitarian minister, political reformer and convict
- Thomas William Parsons (1819–1892), American dentist and poet
- Daniel Pinckney Parker (1781–1850), merchant
- Harvey D. Parker (1805–1884), hotelier
- Francis Parkman (1823–1893), historian
- Fanny Parnell (1844–1882), poet, Irish Nationalist, and the sister of Charles Stewart Parnell
- Robert Swain Peabody (1845–1917), architect, partner in the firm Peabody & Stearns
- Charles Pickering (naturalist) (1805–1878), naturalist/race scientist
- Benjamin Pitman (Hawaii judge) (1815 – January 17, 1888), American businessman who married Hawaiian nobility
- Henry Hoʻolulu Pitman (1845–1863) eldest son of Benjamin Pitman and Kinoʻoleoliliha, a Hawaiian high chiefess, Union Soldier of Native Hawaiian descent
- Eleanor H. Porter (1868–1920), novelist
- George Putnam (1807–1878), minister

== Q ==
- Josiah Quincy III (1772–1864), statesman and educator

== R ==
- John Rawls (1921–2002), philosopher
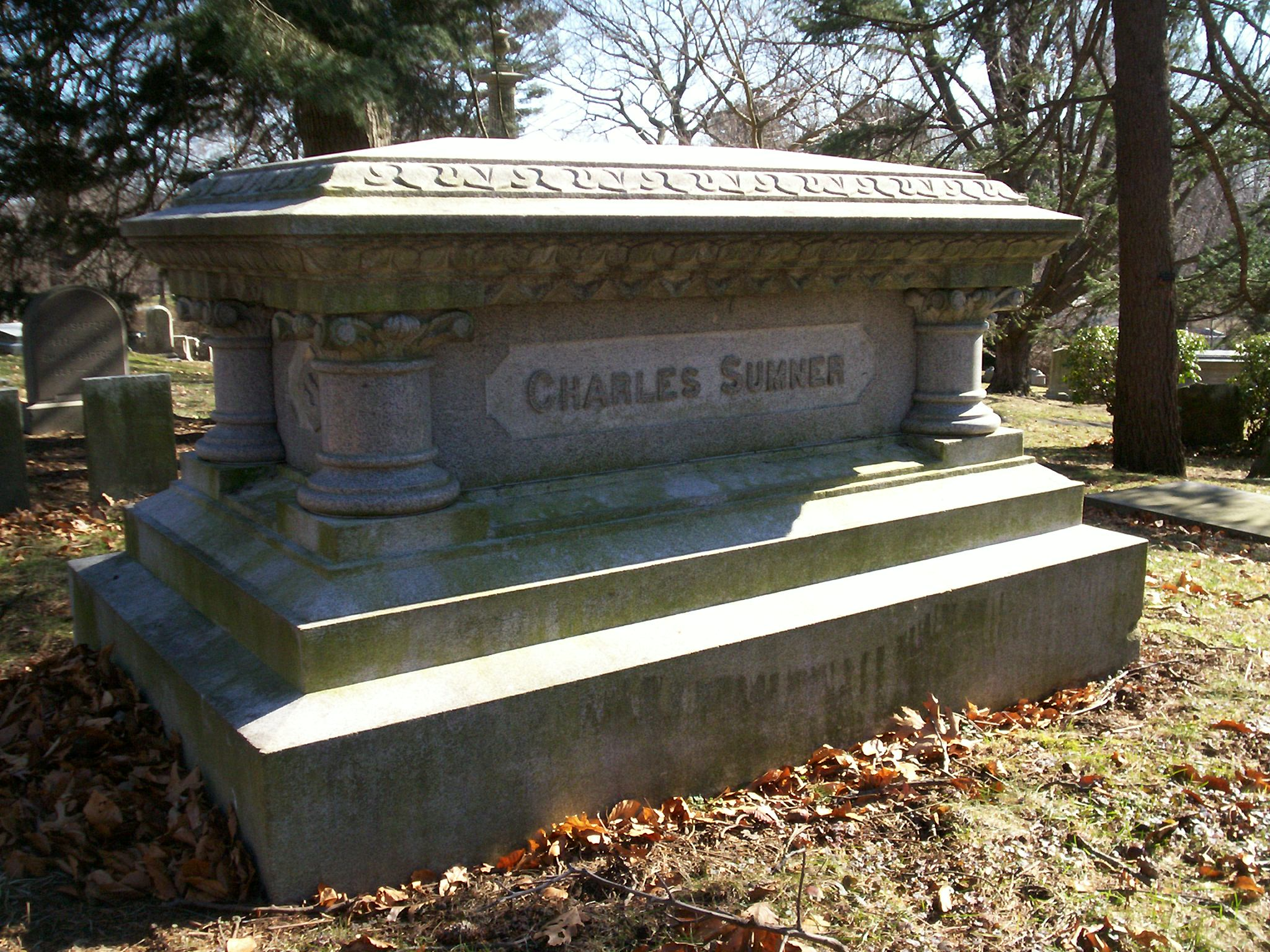
  Charles Sumner's grave
- Anne Revere (1903–1990), actress
- Marjorie Newell Robb (1889-1992), Titanic survivor
- Chandler Robbins (1810–1882), Unitarian minister
- George Lewis Ruffin (1834–1886), first African-American judge in the United States
- Josephine St. Pierre Ruffin (1842–1924), suffragist, publisher of Women's Era
- William Eustis Russell (1857–1896), governor of Massachusetts

== S ==
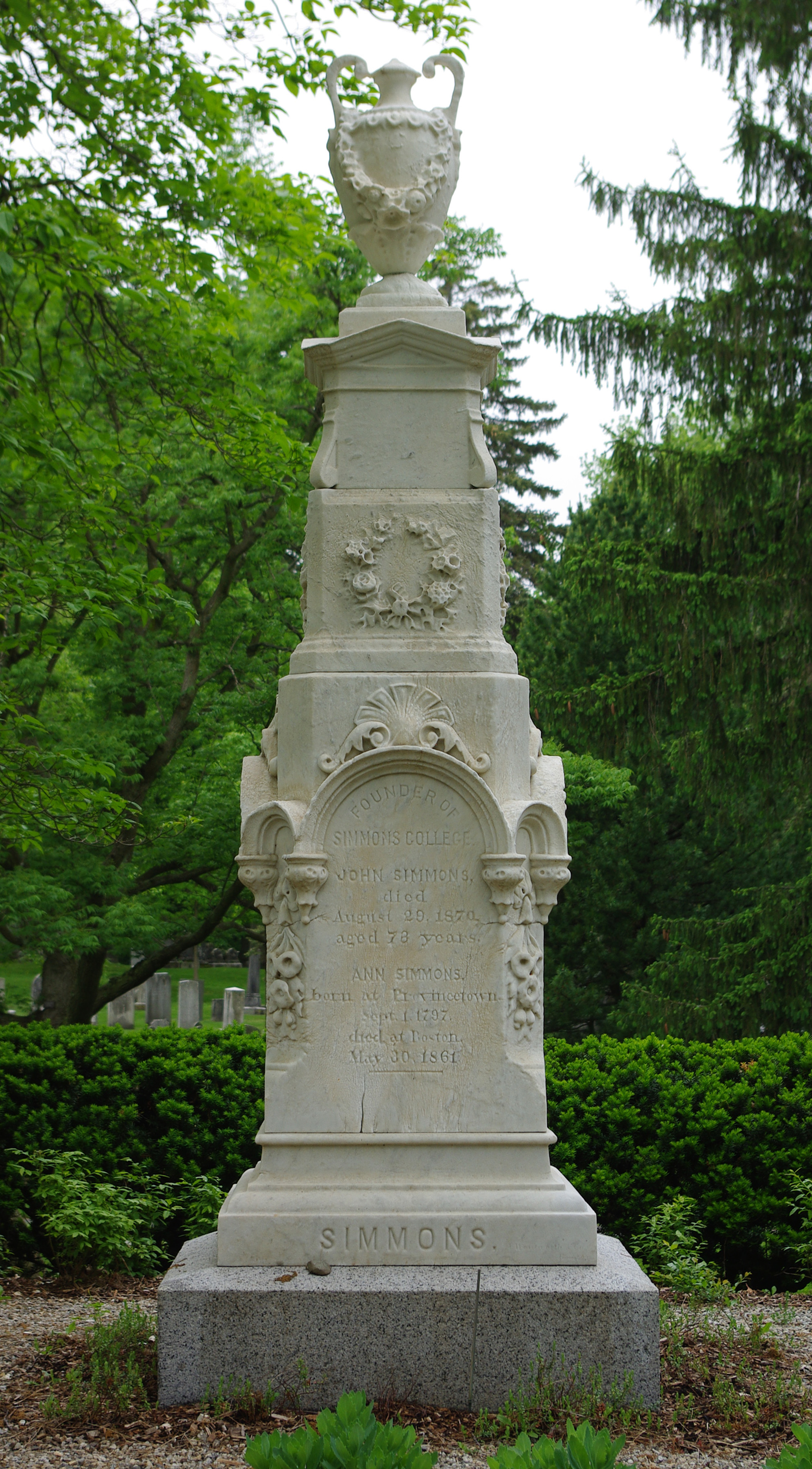
Grave of John Simmons

- Paul A. Samuelson (1915–2009), economist, Nobel Prize winner
- Arthur M. Schlesinger Jr. (1917–2007), historian, presidential speechwriter, public intellectual
- Julian Seymour Schwinger (1918–1994), theoretical physicist, Nobel Prize winner
- Clara Endicott Sears (1863–1960), philanthropist and founder of Fruitlands Museum
- Lemuel Shaw (1781–1861), chief justice of the Massachusetts Supreme Judicial Court
- Claude Shannon (1916–2001), mathematician, electrical engineer, cryptographer
- John Simmons (1796–1870), pioneer in clothing manufacturing, founder of Simmons College
- Sterling Singletary (1996–2025), contestant on Season 4 of Fetch! with Ruff Ruffman
- B. F. Skinner (1904–1990), psychologist
- Emma H. Slade (died 1925), Founder of the National Society of New England Women, President National of the U.S. Daughters of 1812
- Charles Lewis Slattery (1867–1930), bishop, author
- Henry Davis Sleeper (1878–1934), interior designer
- Franklin W. Smith (1826–1911), promoter of historical architecture
- Johann Gaspar Spurzheim (1776–1832), phrenologist
- Daniel C. Stillson (1830–1899), inventor of the Stillson pipe wrench
- I. F. Stone (1907–1989), journalist
- Joseph Story (1779–1845), United States Supreme Court Justice
- Gerry Studds (1937–2006), United States House of Representatives
- Florence Thayer Swain, (1873–1949), Titanic survivor whose first husband, John Bradley Cumings, was lost in the disaster
- Charles Sumner (1811–1874), U.S. Senator

== T ==
- Frank William Taussig (1859–1940), economist
- Randall Thompson (1899–1984), composer
- William Ticknor (1810–1864), publisher and the founder of the publishing house Ticknor and Fields
- William Davis Ticknor Sr. (1881–1938), president and chairman of the board of Commercial Solvents Corporation and president of Commercial Pigments Corporation
- Frederic W. Tilton (1839–1918), educator and 7th Principal of Phillips Academy in Andover, Massachusetts
- William S. Tilton (1828–1889), Civil War brigade commander
- Charles Turner Torrey (1813–1846), abolitionist
- George Makepeace Towle (1841–1893), lawyer, politician, author
- Charles Tufts (1781–1876), businessman who donated the land for Tufts University
- Ross Sterling Turner (1847–1915), painter and educator

== V ==
- Maribel Vinson (1911–1961), nine-time U.S. skating champion and coach

== W ==
- Charles F. Walcott (1838–1887), Union Army colonel and brevet brigadier general
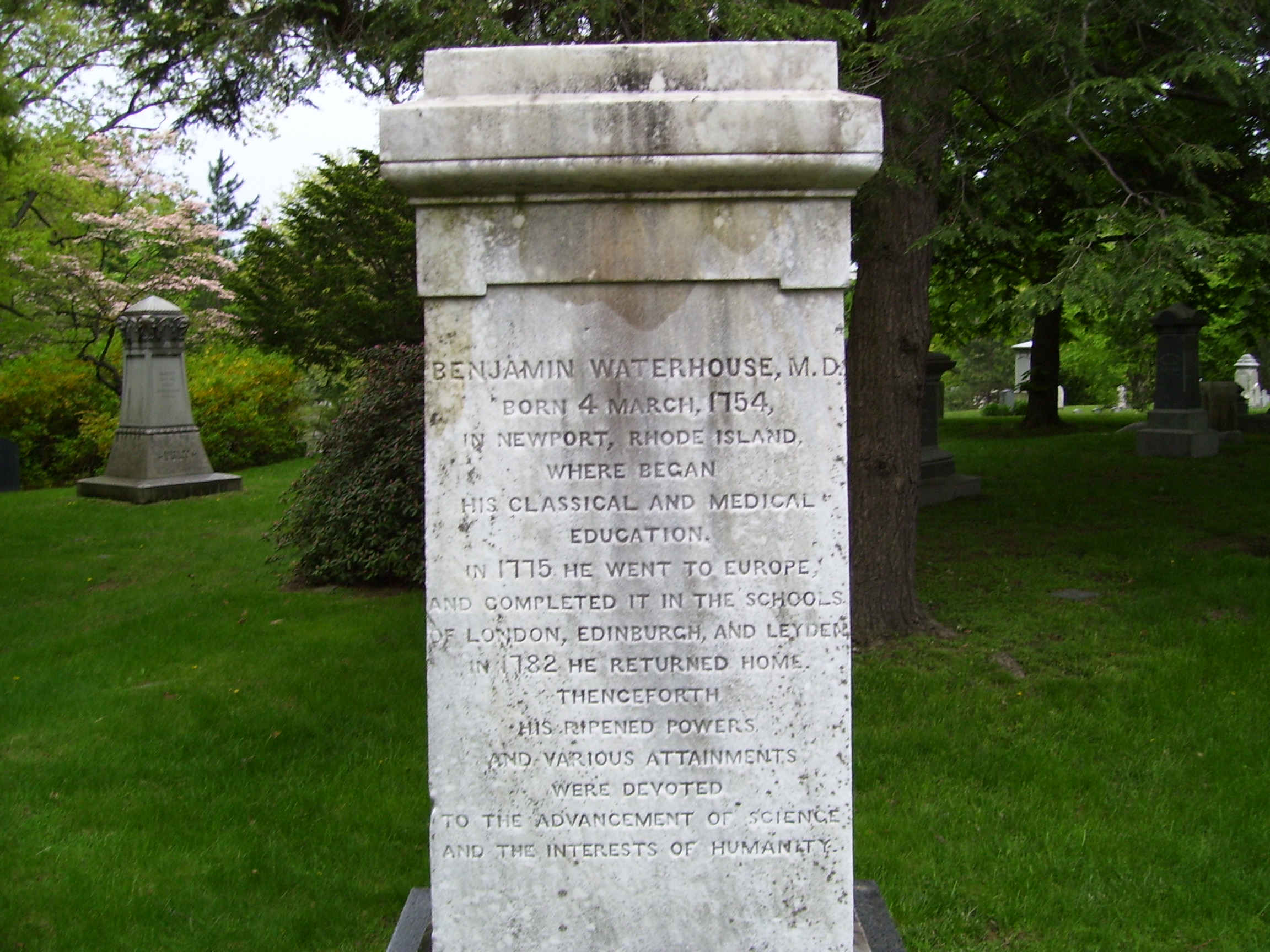
  Benjamin Waterhouse's grave
- Benjamin Waterhouse (1754–1846), physician
- Norman H. White (1871–1951), publisher and politician
- Anne Whitney (1821–1915), sculptor, buried together with her companion, Abby Adeline Manning.
- Nathaniel Parker Willis (1806–1867), publisher, editor, author, poet
- Joseph Winlock (1826–1875), astronomer
- Robert Charles Winthrop (1809–1894), statesman
- Roger Wolcott (1847–1900), governor of Massachusetts
- Robert Burns Woodward (1917-1979), Nobel Prize-winning organic chemist
- Joseph Emerson Worcester (1784–1865), lexicographer

== Y ==
- Joshua Young (1823–1904), Unitarian minister, active abolitionist
