= List of cemeteries in Massachusetts =

This list of cemeteries in Massachusetts includes currently operating, historical (closed for new interments), and defunct (graves abandoned or removed) cemeteries, columbaria, and mausolea which are historical and/or notable. It does not include pet cemeteries.

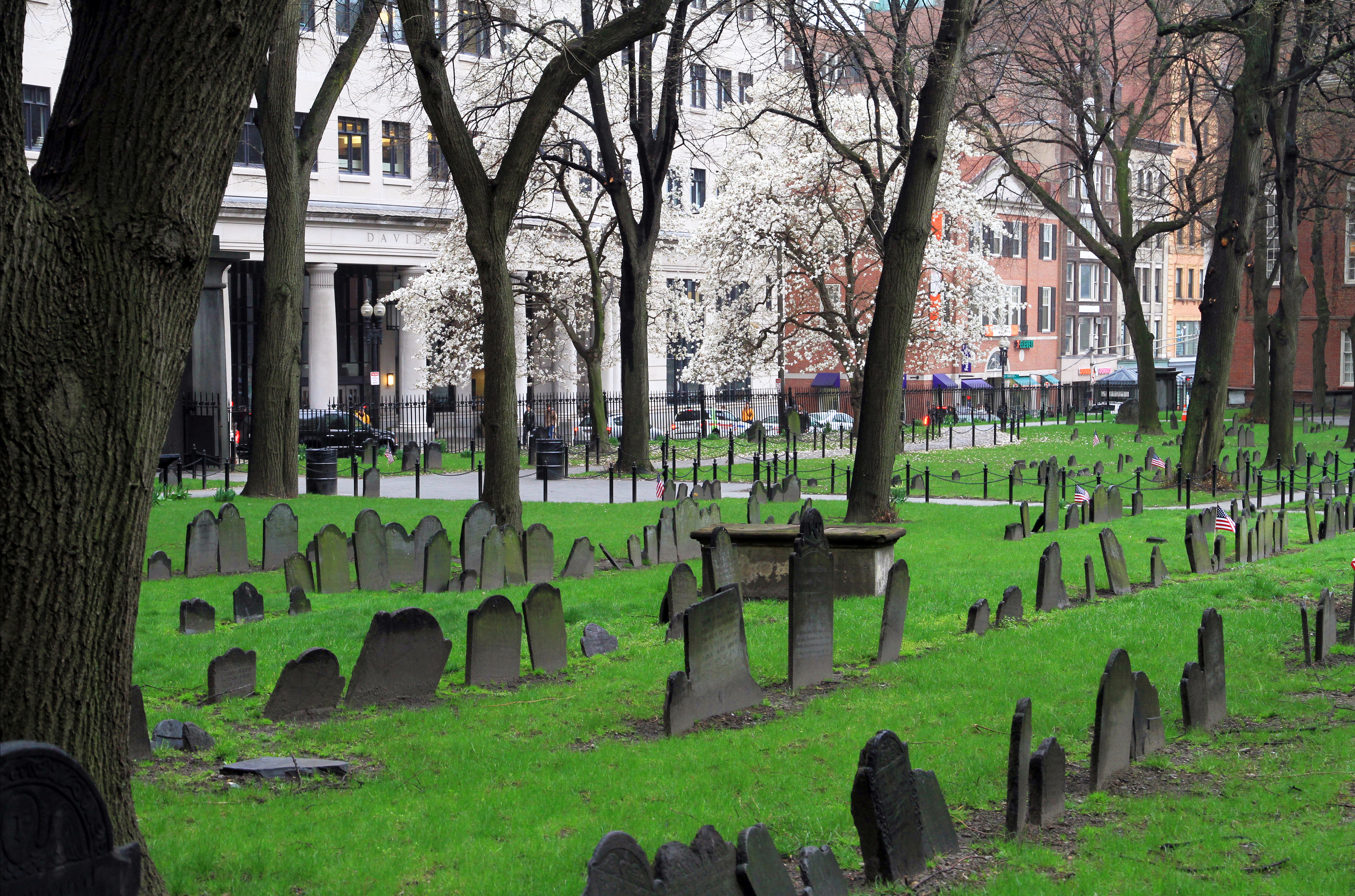
Granary Burying Ground

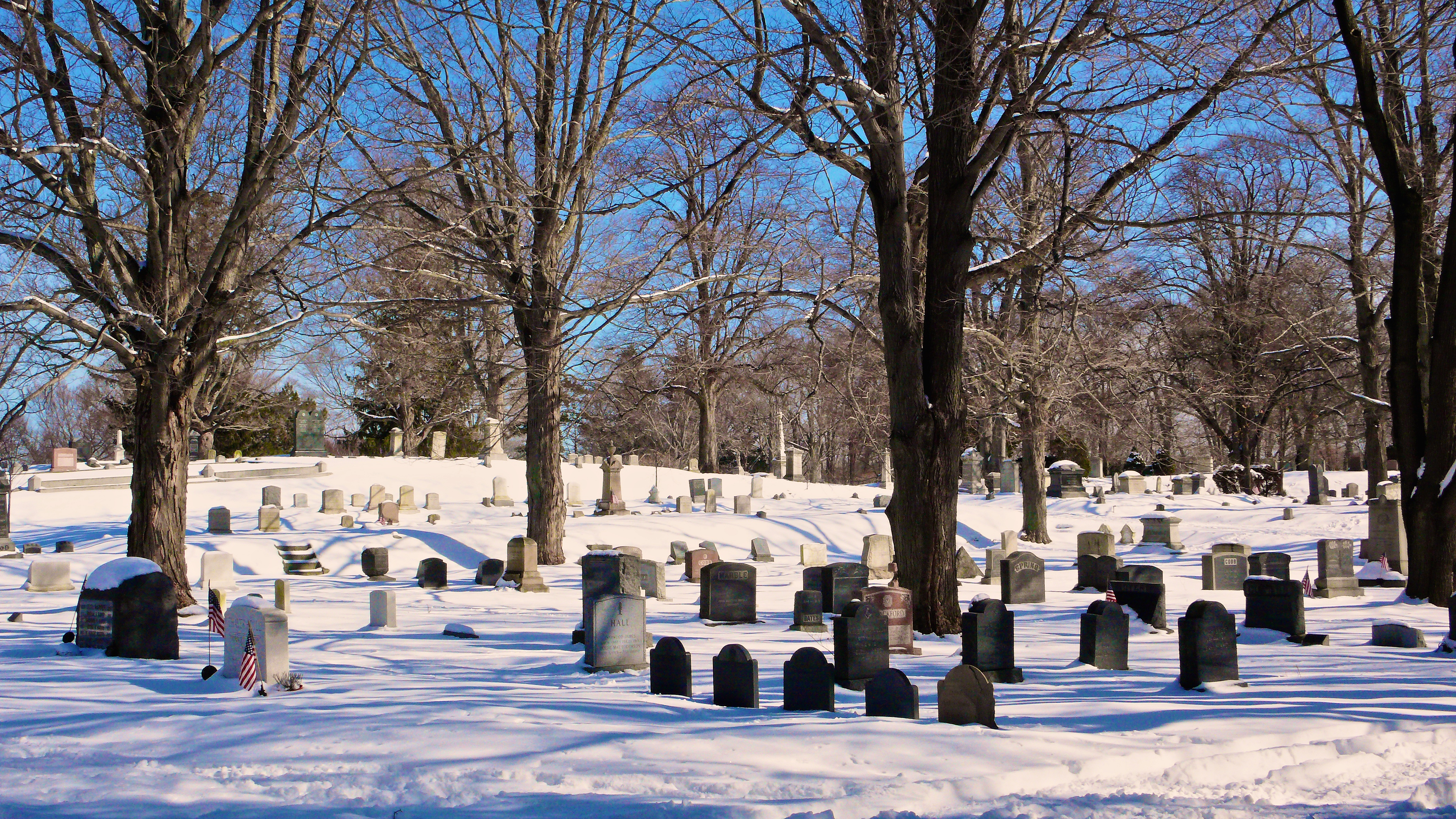
Old Ship Church Cemetery, Hingham, Massachusetts

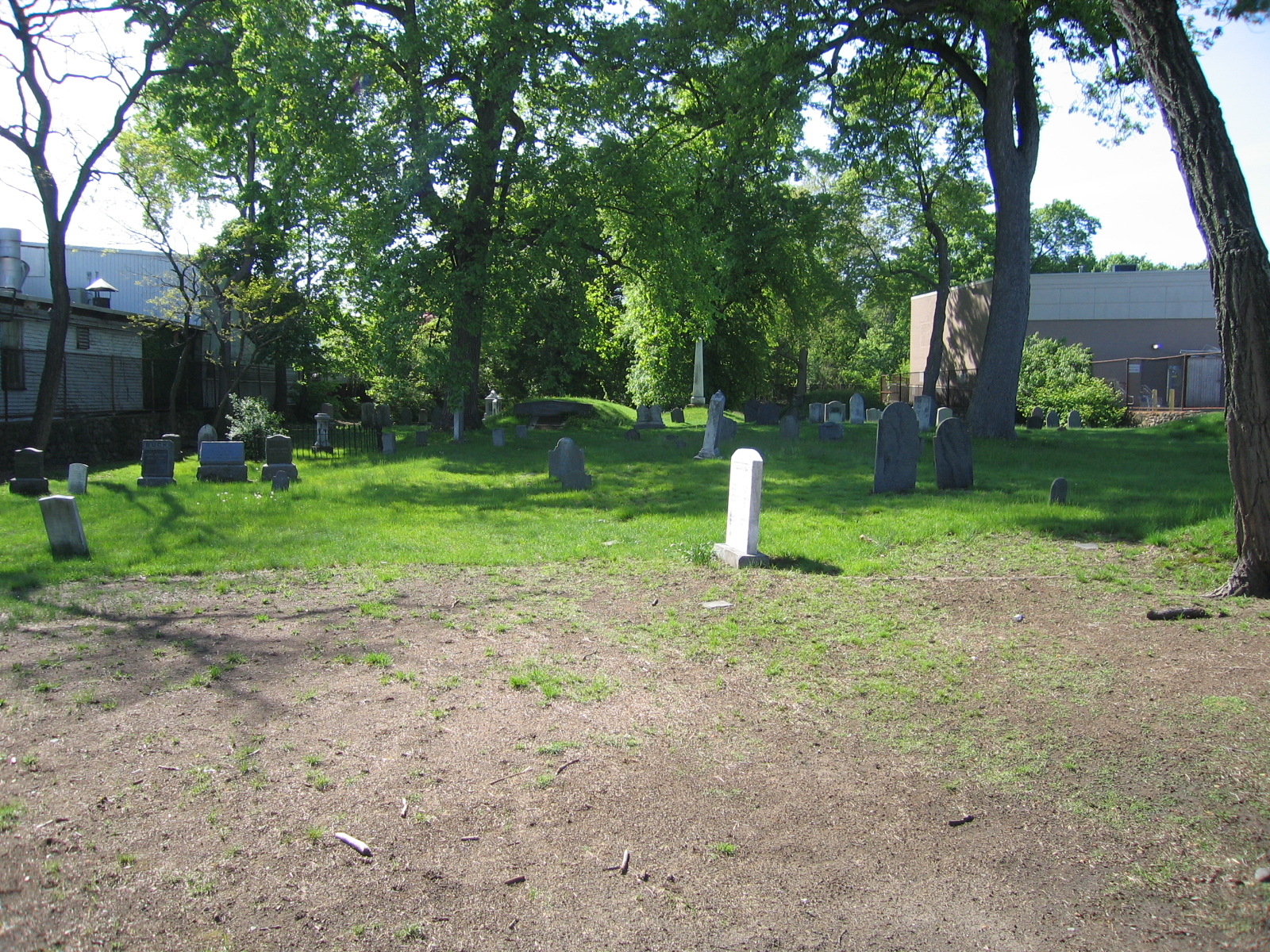
Westerly Burial Ground was established in 1683

== Barnstable County ==
- Lothrop Hill Cemetery, Barnstable
- Hillside Cemetery, Barnstable
- Sandy Street Cemetery, Barnstable

== Berkshire County ==
- Beth Israel Cemetery, North Adams
- Center Cemetery, Stockbridge

== Bristol County ==
- Assonet Burying Ground, Assonet
- Beech Grove Cemetery, Westport
- Friends-Central Cemetery, Westport
- Oak Grove Cemetery, Fall River
- Riverside Cemetery, Fairhaven

== Dukes County ==
- Chilmark Cemetery, Chilmark
- Oak Grove Cemetery, Oaks Bluff

== Essex County ==
- Broad Street Cemetery, Salem, Massachusetts
- Cedar Grove Cemetery, Peabody, Massachusetts
- Charter Street Cemetery/Old Burying Point and Witch Trial Victims Memorial, Salem
- Emerson Cemetery, Peabody, Massachusetts
- Friends Burying Ground, Salem, Massachusetts
- Greenlawn Cemetery, Salem, Massachusetts
- Harmony Grove Cemetery, Salem, Massachusetts
- Holten Burying Grounds, Danvers, Massachusetts
- Howard Street Cemetery, Salem, Massachusetts
- Monumental Cemetery, Peabody, Massachusetts
- Oak Grove Cemetery, Peabody, Massachusetts
- Old Burial Hill, Marblehead
- Old Hill Burying Ground, Newburyport
- Old North Parish Burying Ground, North Andover
- Old South Burial Grounds, Peabody, Massachusetts
- Pine Grove Cemetery, Lynn
- Porter's Burial Ground, Danvers, Massachusetts
- Prescott Cemetery, Peabody, Massachusetts
- St. Mary Cemetery, Salem, Massachusetts
- St. Peter/San Pedro Episcopal Church Cemetery, Salem, Massachusetts
- Swampscott Cemetery, Swampscott
- Walnut Grove Cemetery (Danvers, Massachusetts), Danvers, Massachusetts

== Franklin County ==
- Deerfield Cemetery, Deerfield
- Green River Cemetery, Greenfield
- Hill Cemetery (historic), Shelburne
- Arms Cemetery, Shelburne
- South Cemetery, Shelburne
- East Cemetery, Shelburne
- Center Cemetery, Shelburne
- Hawks Cemetery, Shelburne

== Hampden County ==
- Bay Path Cemetery, Springfield
- Springfield Cemetery, Springfield
- Massachusetts Veterans Memorial Cemetery, Agawam
- Oak Grove Cemetery, 426 Bay Street, Springfield MA 01109

== Hampshire County ==
- Knights Cemetery, Pelham
- Quabbin Park Cemetery, Quabbin Valley
- West Cemetery, Amherst, Massachusetts
- Wildwood Cemetery, Amherst, Massachusetts

== Middlesex County ==
- Belmont Cemetery, Belmont
- Cambridge Cemetery, Cambridge
- Catholic Mount Auburn Cemetery, Watertown
- Edson Cemetery, Lowell
- Forestvale Cemetery, Hudson
- Holy Cross Cemetery and Mausoleum, Malden
- Lowell Cemetery, Lowell (1840s)
- Mount Auburn Cemetery, Cambridge (List of burials at Mount Auburn Cemetery)
- Newton Cemetery, Newton
- North Cambridge Catholic Cemetery, Cambridge
- Pine Haven Cemetery, Burlington
- Salem Street Burying Ground, Medford (late 17th century)
- Sleepy Hollow Cemetery, Concord
- Spring Hill Cemetery, Marlborough
- St. Michael Cemetery, Hudson
- Wildwood Cemetery, Winchester

== Nantucket County ==
- Founders Burial Ground, Nantucket
- Prospect Hill Cemetery, Nantucket

== Norfolk County ==
- Holyhood Cemetery, Brookline
- Walnut Hills Cemetery, Brookline
- Brookdale Cemetery, Dedham
- Old Village Cemetery, Dedham
- Baby Cemetery, Dedham
- Sharon Memorial Park, Sharon
- Knollwood Memorial Park, Canton
- Milton Cemetery, Milton
- Blue Hill Cemetery, Braintree, Massachusetts

== Plymouth County ==
- Burial Hill, Plymouth
- Old Ship Church Cemetery, Hingham
- Calvary Cemetery, Brockton

== Suffolk County ==
- Granary Burying Ground, Boston (17th century)
- Greek Theology School of Boston

== Worcester County ==
- Baptist Common Cemetery, Templeton
- Evergreen Cemetery, Leominster
- Greenlawn Cemetery, Templeton
- Hillside Cemetery, Shrewsbury
- Hope Cemetery, Worcester
- Pine Grove Cemetery, Templeton
- Quaker Cemetery, Leicester
- Templeton Common Burial Ground, Templeton
- Worcester County Memorial Park, Paxton
- Woodlawn Cemetery, Clinton

== See also ==
- List of cemeteries in the United States
- Pioneer cemetery, a type of cemetery
