= Hillside Historic District =

Hillside Historic District may refer to:

- Hillside Historic District (Waterbury, Connecticut), listed on the National Register of Historic Places (NRHP)
- Hillside Historic District (Chehalis, Washington), NRHP listing in Lewis County, Washington

== See also ==
- Hillside Avenue Historic District (disambiguation)
- Hillside (disambiguation)
