= Richard Cowan =

Richard Cowan may refer to:

- Richard David Cowan (1909–1939), long-term companion of Stewart Mitchell
- Richard Sumner Cowan (1921–1997), American botanist
- Richard Cowan (soldier) (1922–1944), American soldier
- Richard O. Cowan (born 1935), historian of the Church of Jesus Christ of Latter-day Saints
- Richard Cowan (cannabis activist) (born 1940), American cannabis activist
- Rich Cowan (born 1956), American politician, film producer and director
- Richard Cowan (bass-baritone) (1957–2015), American opera singer

== See also ==
- Riki Cowan (born 1963), New Zealand rugby league player
