= Hillside Cemetery =

Hillside Cemetery may refer to several places in the United States:

Alphabetical by state, then city

- Hillside Cemetery (Anniston, Alabama), listed on the National Register of Historic Places (NRHP)
- Hillside Memorial Park Cemetery, Culver City, California
- Hillside Cemetery, Barnstable, Massachusetts, a cemetery in Massachusetts
- Hillside Cemetery (North Adams, Massachusetts), NRHP-listed
- Hillside Cemetery, Shrewsbury, Massachusetts, a cemetery in Massachusetts
- Hillside Cemetery (Westford, Massachusetts), NRHP-listed
- Hillside Cemetery (Weare, New Hampshire), burial site of Aubrey Otis Hampton
- Hillside Cemetery (Madison, New Jersey), a Presbyterian historic site
- Hillside Cemetery (Scotch Plains, New Jersey)
- Hillside Cemetery (Middletown, New York), NRHP-listed
- Hillside Cemetery, Abington Township, Montgomery County, Pennsylvania, a cemetery in Pennsylvania
