= Sarah Jacobs =

Sarah Jacobs may refer to:

- Sara Jacobs (born 1989), member of the U.S. House of Representatives from California
- Sarah S. Jacobs (1813–1902), American writer and chief record clerk
