= Association of Professional Genealogists =

- Formation: 1979
- Website: www.apgen.org

The Association of Professional Genealogists is an organization that promotes professional and business ethics in the field of genealogical research. Organized in 1979, its offices are in Colorado (as of December, 2008).

Membership is open to any person or institution willing to support the organization's objectives and code of ethics. Members include family historians, professional researchers, librarians, archivists, writers, editors, consultants, indexers, instructors, lecturers, columnists, booksellers, publishers, computer specialists, and geneticists.

The goals of the organization are:

- To promote international awareness of, and interest in, professional genealogical services
- To promote professional standards in genealogical research, writing, and speaking
- To engage in activities that improve access to, facilitate research on, and preserve records used in the fields of genealogy and local history
- To promote awareness of activities or laws that may affect genealogical and historical research
- To educate the membership and public through publications and lectures
- To provide support for those engaged in genealogical pursuits as a business

The Association publishes a regular magazine, APG Quarterly, with four or five feature articles in each issue.

A bi-annual Directory is issued, listing the registered genealogists together with short biographies.

== Notable members ==
- Karen Batchelor, lawyer and genealogist
