= National Society of New England Women =

Lineage society

- Established: January 24, 1895; 131 years ago
- Founder: Emma H. Slade
- Founded at: New York City
- President General: Barbara Hensley Carpenter
- Website: newenglandwomen.org

The National Society of New England Women is a lineage society whose members are women with an ancestor born in New England before 1789 or in the Nassau or Suffolk counties of Long Island before 1700.

The society was founded by Emma H. Slade in 1895. It met at the Waldorf Astoria New York and established branches elsewhere which were organised as colonies. For example, a colony was established in Madison, Wisconsin in 1930. The organization had at the time 55 colonies with a total membership of over three thousand.

The colonies engage in educational works with a patriotic theme such as sponsoring essay contests, pageants, scholarships and support of libraries.

== Notable members ==
- Jeannette Osborn Baylies, 31st President General of the Daughters of the American Revolution
- Karen Batchelor, lawyer and genealogist
- Ann Davison Duffie Fleck, 34th President General of the Daughters of the American Revolution
- Grace Gemberling, painter
- Emma H. Slade, Founder of the National Society of New England Women, President National of U.S. Daughters of 1812

== See also ==
- Associated Daughters of Early American Witches
- Mayflower Society
- Society of Daughters of Holland Dames
- Southern Dames of America
- Winthrop Society
