= Karen Batchelor =

American genealogist

Karen Batchelor, formerly Karen Batchelor Farmer, is an American lawyer, community activist, and genealogist. In 1977, she became the first-known African American member of the Daughters of the American Revolution. As a genealogist, she co-founded the Fred Hart Williams Genealogical Society, which researches and preserves African-American family history. Batchelor is also a member of the Winthrop Society, the Associated Daughters of Early American Witches, the National Society of New England Women, the National Society Daughters of Colonial Wars, and the Association of Professional Genealogists.

== Early life, family and education ==
Batchelor was born in Detroit to Alice Vivian Dickinson, a schoolteacher, and Thomas Melvin Batchelor, a doctor who was the first African-American on staff, and the first African-American to teach, at Sinai-Grace Hospital. Batchelor's maternal grandfather, Frederick Dickinson, was from Bermuda. Her maternal great-grandmother, Jennie Daisy Hood, was white and her maternal great-grandfather, Prince Albert Weaver, was black. On her father's side, Batchelor is descended from Isaiah Parker, a landowner who purchased an enslaved woman named Charity Ann from his father's estate and had seventeen children with her. She is also a descendant from William Wood, an Irishman who emigrated to the American colonies and served as a private 6th class in the Lancaster County Militia during the American Revolutionary War. She had ancestors that fought for both the Union Army and the Confederate States Army during the American Civil War.

Batchelor grew up in a politically active household in the Russell Woods neighborhood, as both of her parents were civil rights activists who kept many books about the history and struggles of African-Americans in their home library. Batchelor grew up attending the Detroit Opera, visiting museums, and taking violin lessons. She was also a member of the Camp Fire Girls of America in her youth. Batchelor attended nursery school at Tabernacle Missionary Baptist Church and was educated in Detroit public schools. As a teenager, she attended the racially integrated Arthur Junior High School. In 1966, she graduated from Cass Technical High School. As a young woman, she was a debutante and was presented to society at The Cotillion Club, which was founded by her father.

She majored in anthropology at Fisk University before transferring to Oakland University, where she graduated with a Bachelor of Arts degree in psychology. She earned a juris doctor from Wayne State University Law School.

== Career ==
Batchelor practiced as litigator, worked in corporate law, worked as a lobbyist, and represented plaintiffs in a civil rights firm. In 1995, she stopped practicing law and founded The MichCon/Think Twice Foundation's Block Club, which worked to bring local businesses, community organizations, and residents together to revitalize neighborhoods in Detroit. She is also a certified life coach.

=== Genealogy and lineage societies ===
In October 1977, during the administration of President General Jeannette Osborn Baylies, Batchelor became the first-known black member of the Daughters of the American Revolution when she joined the Ezra Parker chapter in Royal Oak, Michigan. One known multiracial member, Eunice Davis, had previously joined the society in 1896. Batchelor's admission into the society, as the 623,128th member, was reported by The New York Times, the Detroit Free Press, and over two-hundred other news publications. She appeared on Good Morning America and NBC Nightly News. Batchelor applied to multiple Michigan chapters but was never contacted, until the Ezra Parker chapter responded to her inquiry. A chapter in California, upon hearing of her membership, questioned the validity of her genealogical proof and accused the National Society of improper behavior. Batchelor's membership was defended by Jeannette O. Baylies, the President General of the Daughters of the American Revolution.

In 1979, Batchelor co-founded the Fred Hart Williams Genealogical Society, which researches and preserves African-American family history. She also served as the National Vice Chair of Lineage Research for African American Patriots and Research. She is a member of the Women Descendants of the Ancient and Honorable Artillery Company, the Associated Daughters of Early American Witches, the Winthrop Society, the National Society of New England Women, and the National Society Daughters of Colonial Wars. She is also a member of the Association of Professional Genealogists.

== Personal life ==
Batchelor was married, but later divorced, and has one son.
