= Frederick B. Deknatel =

American art historian

- Born: Frederick Brockway Deknatel; March 9, 1905; Chicago, Illinois, United States
- Died: November 3, 1973 (aged 68); Cambridge, Massachusetts, United States
- Burial place: Mount Auburn Cemetery
- Occupations: Art historian Educator
- Spouse: Virginia Herrick (m. 1931-1973)
- Children: 3

Academic background
- Education: Princeton University; Harvard University
- Thesis: The Thirteenth-Century Gothic Sculpture of the Cathedrals of Burges and Leon (1935)
- Influences: Charles Rufus Morey; Arthur Kingsley Porter; Paul J. Sachs

Academic work
- Discipline: Art history
- Sub-discipline: Modern art
- Institutions: Harvard University
- Influenced: Kermit S. Champa

Frederick Brockway Deknatel (March 9, 1905 – November 3, 1973) was an American art historian and educator. Deknatel was the William Door Boardman Professor of Fine Arts at Harvard University from 1942 to 1972.

== Career ==
Born in Chicago, Deknatel graduated from the Lawrenceville School in 1924. He then earned a Bachelor of Arts in history from Princeton University in 1928. Deknatel married Virginia Herrick three years later, and received a Doctor of Philosophy in art history from Harvard University in 1935. He wrote a doctoral dissertation on thirteenth-century Gothic sculpture in the Burgos and León Cathedral. However, Deknatel soon gained an interest in modern art of the nineteenth and twentieth centuries.

Five years after graduating, Deknatel was hired as associate professor of fine arts at Harvard, and was made full professor in 1946. In the mid-1940s, he took on a number of important administrative roles, including the assistant dean of Harvard College (1942–1945), chair of the Department of Fine Arts (1944–1949), and president of the College Art Association (1947–1948).

In 1950, Deknatel staged the first exhibition in the United States showcasing the work of the artist Edvard Munch. Deknatel was subsequently named Knight of the Order of St. Olav by the Government of Norway. Three years later, his professorship was endowed as the William Door Boardman Professor of Fine Arts. In 1966, Deknatel was the recipient of an honorary Doctor of Humane Letters from Alfred University. Deknatel retired from Harvard in 1972 and would die one year later of a heart attack.

== See also ==
- List of burials at Mount Auburn Cemetery
- List of Harvard University people
- List of Lawrenceville School alumni
- List of people from Chicago
- List of Princeton University people
