= Ringville Cemetery =

Historic cemetery in Massachusetts, United States

- U.S. National Register of Historic Places
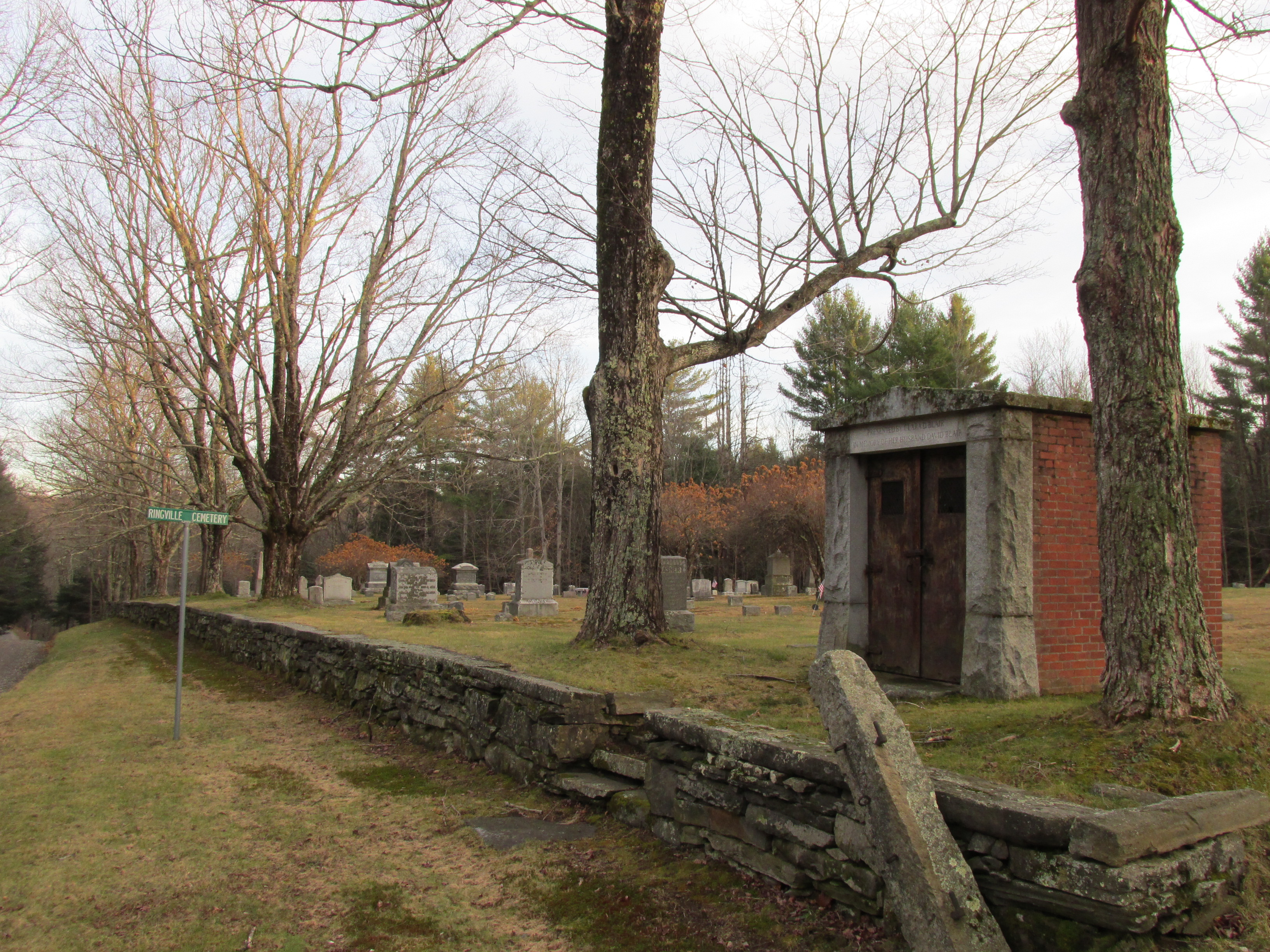
- Ringville Cemetery in 2012

- Location within Massachusetts Location within the United States
- Location: Worthington, Massachusetts
- Coordinates: 42°22′13″N 72°54′56″W
- Built: 1847
- NRHP reference No.: 04000024
- Added to NRHP: February 11, 2004

Ringville Cemetery is a historic cemetery on Witt Hill Road in the hamlet of Ringville, part of Worthington, Massachusetts. The roughly 3-acre (1.2 ha) cemetery was established in 1866, when the town purchased 0.75 acres (0.30 ha) from Ethan Ring. The cemetery was quickly expanded over the next twenty years, reaching a size of 2 acres (0.81 ha). In the 1970s the town purchased an additional acre, giving the cemetery its present size. Ringville, the village in which it lies, was in the 19th century the industrial heart of Worthington, supporting a number of mills.

The cemetery lies on a rise above and south of Witt Hill Road, about 0.25 miles (0.40 km) from Massachusetts Route 112. A stone retaining wall lines the front of the cemetery. It is topped by large quarried granite stones, with two vehicular entrances, and two locations where steps are formed in the wall to provide access to the cemetery grounds. The main stair, in the center of the wall, was given a decorative iron gate c. 1900.

Despite the 1866 establishment of the cemetery, its earliest grave markers have dates from the 1810s. These graves were supposedly moved here from the Ireland Street Cemetery in neighboring Chesterfield; there is evidence of family connections between the two areas. Its most prominent marker is the Blair Vault, located in the northwestern corner, near the front wall. This brick and granite structure bears the inscription "Presented by Clara D. Blair in memory of her husband David Blair." The cemetery is in active use by the town. It was listed on the National Register of Historic Places in 2004.

== See also ==
- North Cemetery (Worthington, Massachusetts), on Cold Street
- Center Cemetery, on Sam Hill Road
- National Register of Historic Places listings in Hampshire County, Massachusetts
