= Hillside School =

Hillside School may refer to:

== United States ==
- Hillside Elementary School in Berkeley, California
- Hillside High School (California) in Upland, California
- Hillside School District 93 in Hillside, Illinois
- Hillside School, a preparatory school in Marlborough, Massachusetts for boys in grades 4-9 (k-9)
- Hillside Middle School (Northville, Michigan) in Northville, Michigan
- Hillside High School (New Jersey) in Hillside, New Jersey
- Hillside High School (Durham, North Carolina) in Durham, North Carolina
- Hillside School, a private school for students in grades 1–8 with learning disabilities in Macungie, Pennsylvania

== United Kingdom ==
- Hillside Special School, in Portslade, Brighton and Hove
- Hillside High School, Bootle in Bootle, Merseyside
- Hillside Special School, in Sudbury, Suffolk
- Hillside School, Malvern, former preparatory school in Malvern, Worcestershire

== Canada ==
- Hillside Senior Public School, in Mississauga, Ontario
