= Kermit S. Champa =

American art historian

- Born: Kermit Swiler Champa; August 20, 1939; Lancaster, Pennsylvania, United States
- Died: July 22, 2004 (aged 64); Providence, Rhode Island, United States
- Spouse: Judith Tolnick
- Children: 3

Academic background
- Education: Yale University; Harvard University
- Thesis: The Genesis of Impressionism (1965)
- Doctoral advisor: Frederick B. Deknatel
- Influences: Clement Greenberg

Academic work
- Discipline: Art history
- Sub-discipline: Impressionism
- Institutions: Brown University
- Notable students: Olivier Berggruen

Kermit Swiler Champa (August 20, 1939 – July 22, 2004) was an American art historian and educator. A scholar of Impressionism, Champa was the Andrea V. Rosenthal Professor of the History of Art and Architecture at Brown University from 1970 to 2004.

== Career ==
Born in Lancaster to Valentino Anthony and Gladys Swiler, Champa earned a Bachelor of Arts in Art History from Yale University in 1960, where he played trombone. He went on to receive a Doctor of Philosophy in Art History from Harvard University in 1965, where he studied under Frederick B. Deknatel and Clement Greenberg. Champa wrote a doctoral dissertation about the Impressionist period, under Deknatel.

A specialist on Impressionist paintings, Champa first taught at Yale as an Assistant Professor of Art History. He then moved to Brown University in 1970. A year later, he was honored by the Government of Germany with the Order of Merit of the Federal Republic of Germany. In 1974, Champa became a full Professor and was named the Andrea V. Rosenthal Professor of the History of Art and Architecture in 1995. He taught there until death in 2004 from lung cancer.

== Selected works ==
- German Painting of the 19th Century, 1970
- Studies in Early Impressionism, 1973
- Mondrian Studies, 1985
- The Rise of Landscape Painting in France: Corot to Monet, 1991
- Masterpiece Studies: Manet, Zola, Van Gogh, and Monet, 1994

== See also ==
- List of Brown University faculty
- List of Harvard University people
- List of Yale University people
