= North Cemetery (Worthington, Massachusetts) =

Historic cemetery in Massachusetts, United States

- U.S. National Register of Historic Places
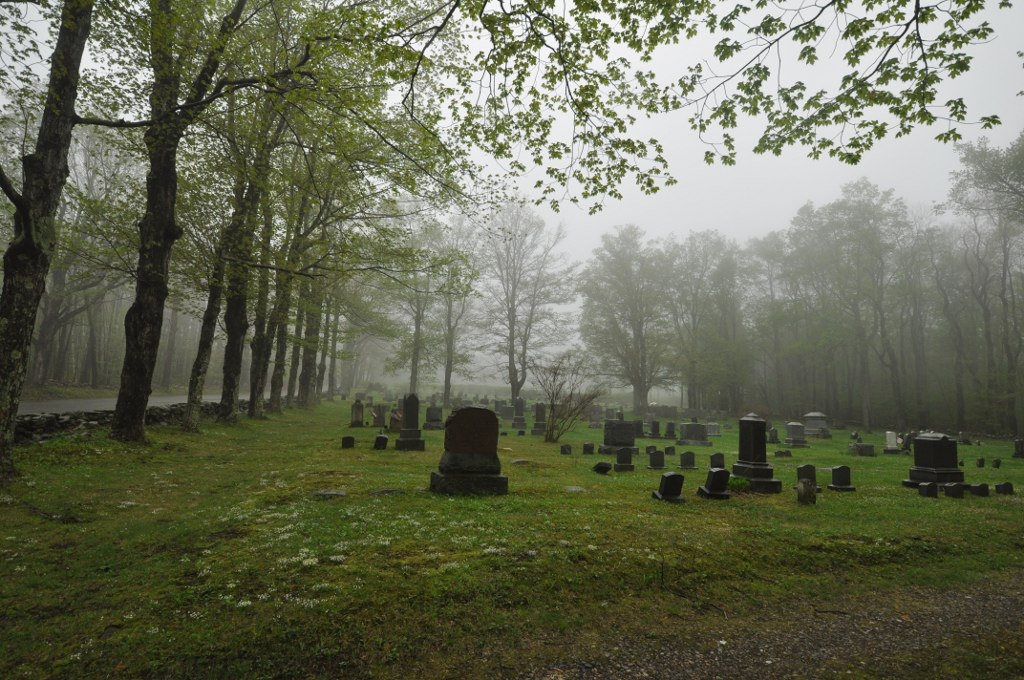
- North Cemetery in 2014

- Location within Massachusetts Location within the United States
- Location: Cold and North Sts., Worthington, Massachusetts
- Coordinates: 42°25′22″N 72°56′49″W
- Area: 3.5 acres (1.4 ha)
- Built: c. 1790
- Architect: H. Fox
- NRHP reference No.: 04000121
- Added to NRHP: March 3, 2004

North Cemetery is a historic cemetery in Worthington, Massachusetts. The 3.5-acre (1.4 ha) municipal cemetery is located at the corner of Cold and North Streets not far from Worthington Corners; it is the town's largest cemetery. The cemetery was listed on the National Register of Historic Places in 2004, for its funerary architecture and its role as the burial ground for the town's early settlers.

== Description and history ==
North Cemetery is located about 1 mile (1.6 km) north of the Worthington Corners, the town's main village center, on the north side of Cold Street just west of North Street. About 2.5 acres (1.0 ha) have been formally laid out in a roughly rectangular shape. Three of the cemetery's four sides are lined with stone walls, setting it off from the surrounding woods and fields. Access is through three breaks in the wall, two of which provide vehicular access. The eastern two breaks are marked by granite posts about four feet high that bear evidence of having had gates mounted on them. In the southeaster corner of the cemetery is the remnant of a storage vault, which was used until the 1950s to hold caskets when winter conditions made interment impossible. The cemetery has over 700 markers, mostly of granite or marble. The most prominent grave is that of the Horace Cole family, which features a zinc obelisk erected in 1877. A number of the grave markers are made out of Goshen granite, quarried in neighboring Goshen. A small number of the grave markers bear marks of regionally known stone carvers.

The cemetery's date of establishment is uncertain; its earliest grave marker dates to 1790. A number of the town's founders and early leading citizens are buried there. Graves are laid out generally with older burials in the lower (eastern) end, proceeding up the slope to the west, where 21st-century burials have been made.

== See also ==
- Center Cemetery, on Sam Hill Road
- Ringville Cemetery, on Witt Hill Road
- National Register of Historic Places listings in Hampshire County, Massachusetts
