= James Henry Blake (zoologist) =

American zoologist and scientific illustrator (1845–1941)

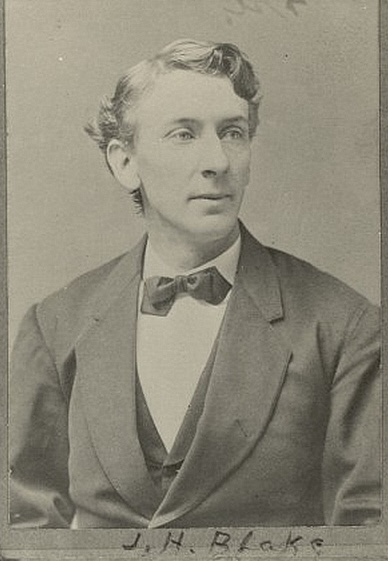
- Blake ca. 1873
- Born: July 8, 1845; Boston, Massachusetts, US
- Died: July 20, 1941 (aged 96); Somerville, Massachusetts
- Resting place: Mount Auburn Cemetery
- Education: Harvard University
- Known for: Scientific illustrations
- Scientific career
- Fields: Zoology; Cetology; Malacology
- Workplaces: Museum of Comparative Zoology at Harvard University
- Academic advisors: Louis Agassiz

James Henry Blake (July 8, 1845 – July 20, 1941) was an American zoologist and scientific illustrator who worked for the Museum of Comparative Zoology at Harvard University. He later served as an artist for the United States Fish Commission and the U.S. Geological Survey. The scientific literature contains many of his illustrations.

== Life and career ==
Blake was born in Boston on July 18, 1845. He received his schooling in Provincetown, Massachusetts, and in 1864 he enrolled in the Lawrence Scientific School at Harvard University. At Harvard, he worked as a student assistant in the conchology department of the Museum of Comparative Zoology, organizing the specimen collections under the tutelage of Louis Agassiz. In 1868, he sketched and recorded the features of mollusks collected during the 1865–66 Thayer Expedition to Brazil. In 1871, Blake accompanied the Hassler Expedition as Agassiz's assistant on this two-year deep-sea dredging trip, during which he drew specimens and supervised the fishing operations that gathered up 30,000 fish specimens. Blake's 152-page scrapbook, filled with clippings and notations chronicling the expedition, is "one of the Ernst Mayr Library’s most prized holdings."

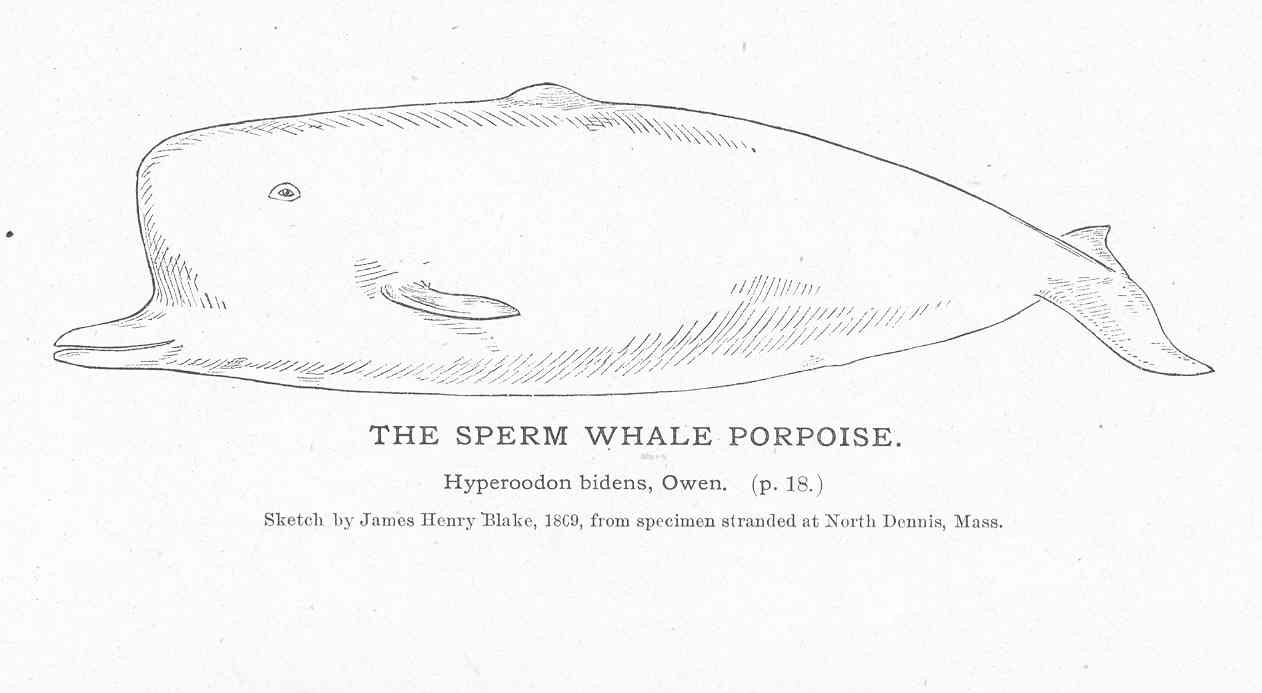
1869 pencil sketch of a sperm whale by James Henry Blake

In September 1872, having returned to Harvard, Blake resumed his work organizing and documenting the museum's mollusks. In 1875, Nathaniel Thayer’s philanthropic funding for Blake’s salary finally ran out, and he had to leave the museum. He spent five years as artist for the Vineyard Sound Survey of the U.S. Fish Commission and also worked for the U.S. Geological Survey and the Mississippi Geological Survey. Blake illustrated many zoological articles and monographs by scientists such as Samuel Garman, Harold L. Babcock, and Joel Asaph Allen. He co-founded the Boston Malacological Club, serving as the club's president from 1918 to 1919. Known primarily as a malacologist, Blake had a lifelong fascination with whales, notably illustrating Glover M. Allen's The Whalebone Whales of New England (1916). He was a member of the Boston Society of Natural History from 1870 until his death and served on its governing council. In 1894–95, he was president of the Cambridge Art Circle. Besides his scientific work, he studied art in New York, painted landscapes, and moonlighted as an art teacher.

Blake married Lucinda Smith Critchett (1844–1907) in Provincetown in 1871 and had two sons with her. He died on July 20, 1941, at the age of 96 in Somerville, Massachusetts. He was buried in Mount Auburn Cemetery. Perhaps the last surviving student or employee of Louis Agassiz at the time of his death, he bequeathed most of his personal collections and artwork to the Museum of Comparative Zoology. A collection of his colored drawings of whales and mollusks made its way into the collection of the Boston Museum of Science.
