= Hillside Avenue Historic District =

Hillside Avenue Historic District may refer to:

- Hillside Avenue Historic District (Medford, Massachusetts), listed on the National Register of Historic Places (NRHP)
- Hillside Avenue Historic District (Plainfield, New Jersey), listed on the NRHP in Union County, New Jersey
