= Hillside High School, Bootle =

Hillside High School

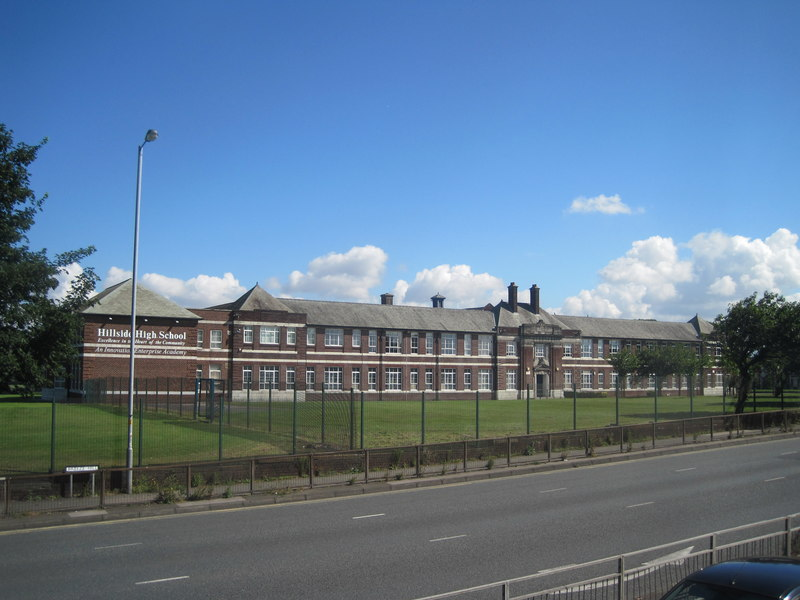
- The school viewed from Breeze Hill

Location
- Breeze Hill; Bootle, Merseyside, L20 9NU; England; 53°26′54″N 2°58′30″W

Information
- Type: Academy
- Motto: "Excellence in the Heart of the Community"
- Established: 1972
- Local authority: Sefton
- Trust: Wade Deacon Trust
- Department for Education URN: 141693 Tables
- Ofsted: Reports
- Chair: Paul Fowler
- Principal: J Anderson-Nicholls
- Gender: Coeducational (Mixed)
- Age: 11 to 16
- Enrolment: 701
- Colour
- Website: https://www.hillsidehigh.co.uk

Hillside High School is a mixed comprehensive secondary school in Bootle, Merseyside, England.

== History ==
Hillside High School was established in 1972 following the merger of Bootle Girls' Grammar School and Balliol County Secondary School. In the summer of 1984, a £3.5 million refurbishment project began at the Bootle Girls' Grammar School site on Breeze Hill, Bootle, with the aim of consolidating the school onto a single site and reducing its capacity to 750 students. Two years into the refurbishment project, the school was subject to an arson attack in April 1986, causing £2,000 worth of damage.

The newly redesigned school was officially opened in May 1989 by David Sheppard, the Bishop of Liverpool. The refurbishment included the addition of a new storey and the conversion of the original school hall into a drama theatre and library. The local authority and building architects ensured that the new additions were carefully integrated with the existing architecture of the original Bootle Girls' Grammar School, which first opened its doors in 1931.

In September 2004, Hillside became a designated Specialist Science College. In September 2005 four new humanities classrooms were opened, the dining hall was extended and two existing classrooms were renovated to provide an additional Science laboratory.

The school converted to academy status in March 2015 under the umbrella of the Wade Deacon Trust.

A 2023 Ofsted inspection graded the school as "good".
