= Hillside (Charles Town, West Virginia) =

Historic house in West Virginia, United States

- U.S. National Register of Historic Places
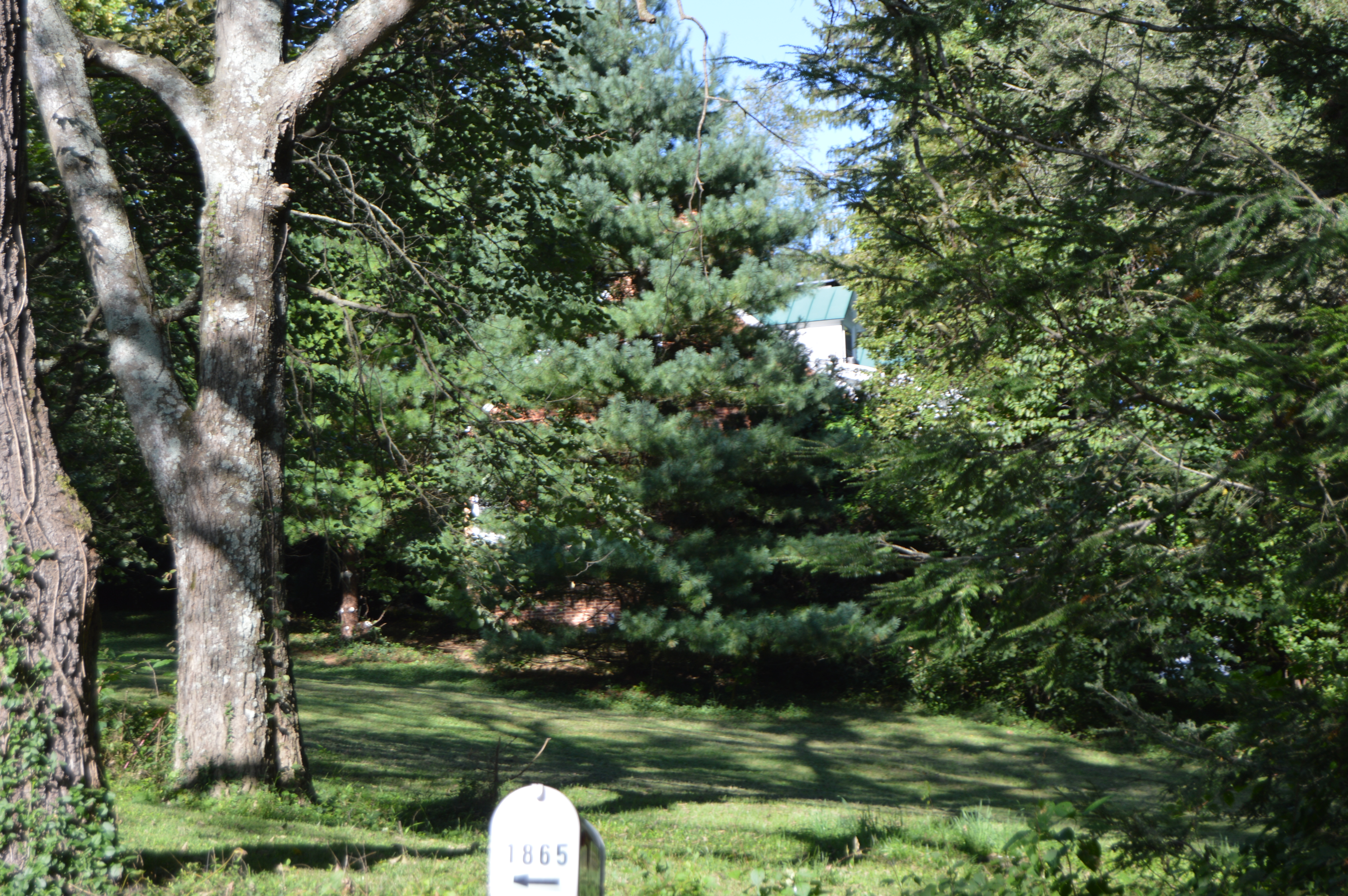
- Roadside view

- Location within West Virginia Location within the United States
- Nearest city: Charles Town, West Virginia
- Coordinates: 39°15′47″N 77°52′5″W
- Built: ca. 1798-1800
- Architect: William Helm
- Architectural style: Colonial, Federal
- NRHP reference No.: 85003521
- Added to NRHP: December 12, 1985

Hillside, also known as Little Elmington, is a 1½ story brick house near Charles Town, West Virginia dating to circa 1798–1800. The house possesses a striking two-story gallery supported by five large round columns. The property includes a rubblestone barn and spring house. The house's name refers to its construction into the natural hillside in a manner similar to that of a bank barn, with the principal entry on the upper, uphill level.
