= Hillside Cemetery (Westford, Massachusetts) =

Historic cemetery in Massachusetts, United States

- U.S. National Register of Historic Places
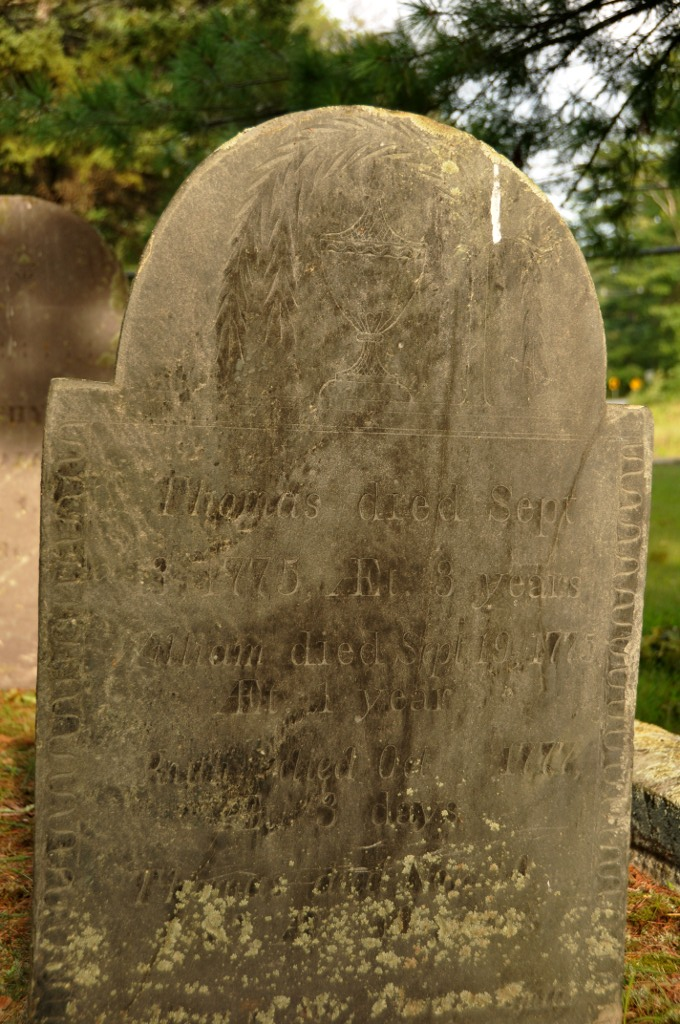
- Gravestone of a child, c. 1777

- Location within Massachusetts Location within the United States
- Location: Westford, Massachusetts
- Coordinates: 42.6016°N 71.4383°W
- Area: 1 acre (0.40 ha)
- Architect: Andrews & Wheeler; Nichols, D.
- NRHP reference No.: 05001373
- Added to NRHP: December 6, 2005

Hillside Cemetery, also known as the North Burying Ground, is a historic cemetery on Depot and Nutting Roads in Westford, Massachusetts. The cemetery was established in 1753, and is the burial site of a number of people important in local history. It contains approximately 300 burials, and continues in active use. The cemetery was listed on the National Register of Historic Places in 2005.

== Description and history ==
Hillside Cemetery is a rectangular parcel about 1 acre (0.40 ha) in size, set at the northwest corner of Nutting Road and Depot Street in central northern Westford. Raised above the streets, its street-facing sides are lined with granite retaining walls topped by split capstones, with dry-laid fieldstone walls around the other two sides. A paved drive skirts around the northern and western sides, joining the two principal entrances; pedestrian access is also possible via stairs in the south wall. The cemetery is laid out in a typical colonial-period rectilinear form. Some family plots are bounded by granite curbing, varying in height. There are about 300 burials, the earliest labeled grave dating to 1761.

The cemetery was established in 1753 with a gift to the town of its land by Ebenezer and Thomas Wright (the latter of whom is interred here). The oldest dated grave is that of Jacob and Abigail Wright, a married couple both of whom died in 1761. The earliest markers are typically slate, while granite and marble appear in the markers and memorials of the 19th and 20th centuries. There are several obelisks (including one with a triangular cross-section), all placed in the second half of the 19th century. There are two zinc burial markers, both manufactured by the Monumental Bronze Company of Bridgeport, Connecticut for members of the Keyes family.

== See also ==
- National Register of Historic Places listings in Middlesex County, Massachusetts
