= Winthrop Society =

The Winthrop Society is a hereditary organization made up of the descendants of immigrants who arrived in New England on the Winthrop Fleet, forming the Massachusetts colony, or other Great Migration ships before 1634, as well as immigrants to Massachusetts by 1640.

== Notable members ==
- Karen Batchelor, lawyer and genealogist
