= Center Cemetery (Worthington, Massachusetts) =

Historic cemetery in Massachusetts, United States

- U.S. National Register of Historic Places
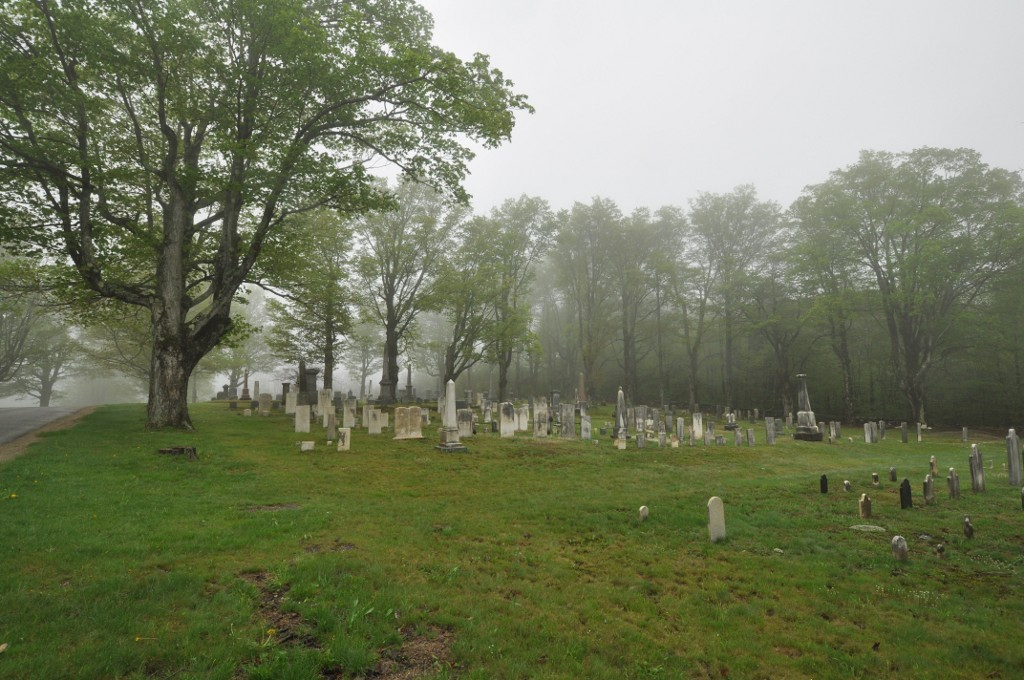
- Center Cemetery in 2014

- Location within Massachusetts Location within the United States
- Location: Sam Hill Rd., Worthington, Massachusetts
- Coordinates: 42°23′40″N 72°56′36″W
- Area: 2.4 acres (0.97 ha)
- Built: c. 1774
- Architect: G. Fleming
- NRHP reference No.: 04000084
- Added to NRHP: February 26, 2004

Center Cemetery is a historic cemetery on the south side of Sam Hill Road in Worthington, Massachusetts. The 2.4-acre (0.97 ha) cemetery was established c. 1774 (the date of its earliest marker), and continues to be used today. Its burials include many of the founders and early settlers of Worthington, and of families influential in the growth and development of the town. The cemetery listed on the National Register of Historic Places in 2004.

== Description and history ==
Worthington's Center Cemetery is located southwest of the town center, on the south side of Sam Hill Road. The roughly rectangular plot is set off from its surroundings by a stone wall on three sides, with a line of mature sugar maples just inside the walls, and running along the fourth side. The walls at one time had wooden fencing mounted on them, but this has been removed. Movement within the cemetery is via a turf cart path that skirts its perimeter, just inside the line of trees, and a series of paths laid out in a grid. Most of the over 600 stones are marble, with most of the rest made of granite. Many of the granite markers are made from stone quarried in nearby Goshen, and a number of them bear the marks of locally known stone carvers. One marker, that of Jerome Kinne (d. 1777) has an example of a "Hampton Indian", a motif resembling a Native American face, that is rarely found outside the Hampton, Connecticut area.

The oldest stones are in the lowest, westernmost portion of the cemetery. In these sections, stones are laid out without any sort of family grouping. These are more often seen beginning in the 19th century, with bounded family plot areas found near the cemetery's highest land. The area that was the last developed is decorated in part with ornamental plantings.

== See also ==
- Ringville Cemetery, Witt Hill Road
- North Cemetery (Worthington, Massachusetts), Cold Street
- National Register of Historic Places listings in Hampshire County, Massachusetts
