= Hillside, Warwick =

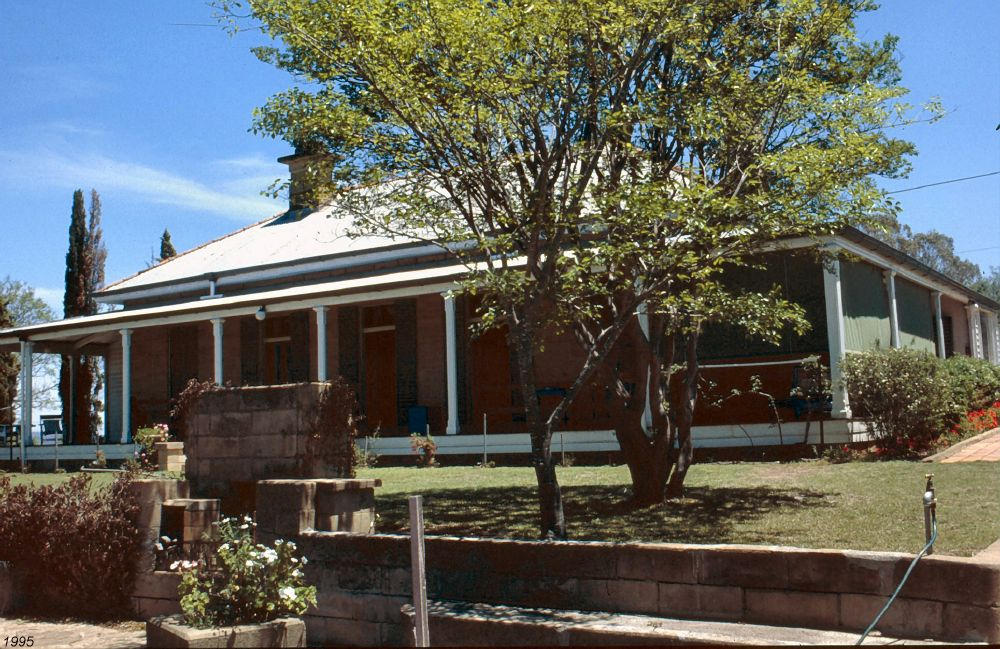
- Hillside, 1995

- Location within Queensland Location within Australia
- 28.2036°S 152.0292°E
- Location: 25 Weewondilla Road, Warwick, Southern Downs Region, Queensland, Australia

History
- Design period: 1840s–1860s (mid-19th century)
- Built: 1862–1864

Site notes
- Architect: Benjamin Joseph Backhouse
- Architectural style: Georgian

Queensland Heritage Register
- Official name: Hillside, Thuruna
- Type: state heritage (built, landscape)
- Designated: 21 October 1992
- Reference no.: 600942
- Significant period: 1860s (historical) ongoing (social); 1860s (fabric)
- Significant components: residential accommodation – rectory, garden/grounds, driveway
- Builders: William Craig

Hillside is a heritage-listed parsonage at 25 Weewondilla Road, Warwick, Southern Downs Region, Queensland, Australia. It was designed by Benjamin Joseph Backhouse and built from 1862 to 1864. It is also known as Thuruna. It was added to the Queensland Heritage Register on 21 October 1992.

== History ==
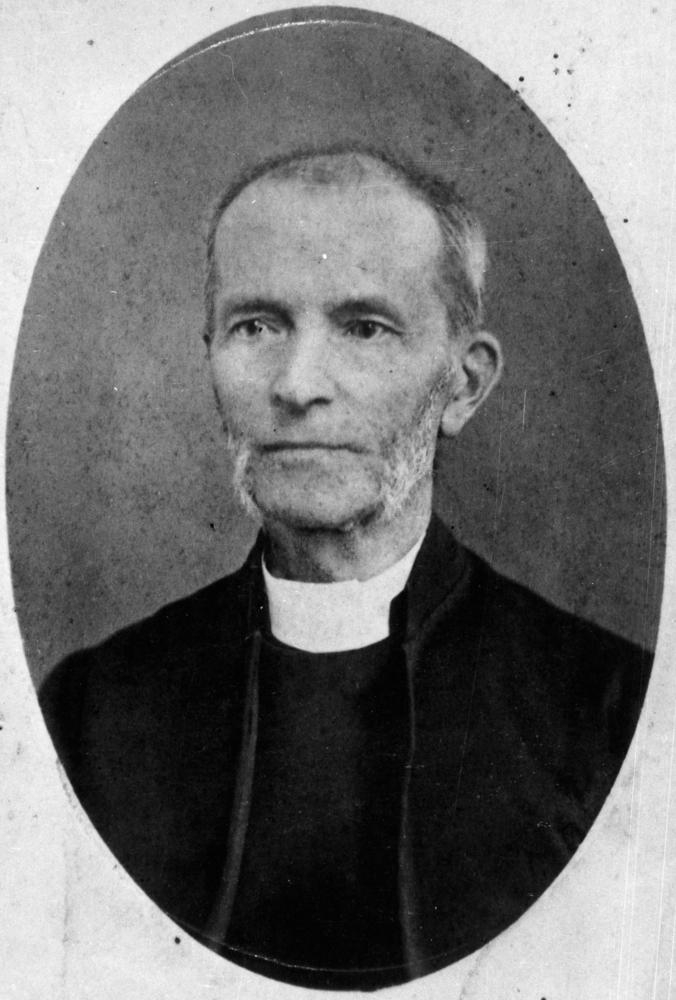
Rev. Benjamin Glennie

Hillside was constructed as the Anglican parsonage for Reverend Benjamin Glennie in 1862–64 to designs of prominent Brisbane architect, Benjamin Backhouse.

The Reverend Benjamin Glennie held Anglican services in Warwick as the Incumbent of Moreton Bay and the Darling Downs from 1848. The services were held in the old Court House in Alice Street until 1858 when a timber slab church was constructed on the corner of Grafton and Albion Streets.

Benjamin Glennie was born in Dulwich, Surrey, England on 29 January 1812, and after his education arrived in Sydney in January 1848 following his three brothers who had arrived in the colony earlier. Glennie was made deacon by Dr William Tyrrell on 19 March 1848 and appointed to Moreton Bay, where he faced numerous challenges encouraging the growth of the church. Originally he was based in Brisbane, but made extensive tours of the surrounding areas, including Ipswich and the Darling Downs.

After his ordination as a priest in 1849 he was transferred to Drayton, on the Darling Downs, where he was responsible for the whole of the Downs. This remained his responsibility until 1860 when the parishes were re-organised and he was then moved to Warwick where he served as the parish priest until 1872. He was an arduous and tireless worker, establishing churches, purchasing land and encouraging congregations.

After moving from Warwick, Glennie was appointed to Drayton where he served until 1876, when he returned to the Toowong parish of Brisbane. He had been appointed an archdeacon earlier in his career, but was now able to devote his full-time as an examining chaplain and in the training of younger members of the holy orders. Glennie is often considered the pioneer of the Anglican movement in Queensland, and is particularly fondly remembered on the Darling Downs.

The house was not completed to original plans, only the eastern half and central hallway were constructed. Though rooms were planned to the west of the hallway, as is indicated by the doorways in the hall, this section was never constructed to Backhouse's designs.

It was during his time in Warwick that Glennie built the first purpose-built parsonage in there, Hillside. His first residence was in McEvoy Street, but when this proved inadequate he had plans prepared for a new parsonage on the outskirts of Warwick overlooking the growing township.

The land on which Hillside was later built was purchased by Edward Wyndam Tufnell, the Anglican Bishop of Brisbane on 28 March 1865 for £58/3/1. Plans were prepared for the parsonage in 1862–64 by Brisbane architect, Benjamin Backhouse, who was in partnership at the time with Thomas Taylor. The contractor for the project was William Craig. A newspaper report of August 1867 suggests that the parsonage had just been completed and that various members of the congregation were presenting Glennie with £120 of drawing-room furniture.

Glennie remained in residence at the parsonage until he was relocated to Drayton in 1870, and soon after when James Matthews was the rector at Warwick it was decided that Hillside was too far from the church and another parsonage was planned. Hillside was transferred to the Corporation of the Synod of the Diocese in 1872, and another rectory was constructed in the church close.

In 1878 Hillside was leased for a period of seven years to a George Sumner Renwick Dines and then passed from the Anglican Church and changed hands many times, until it was bought by local architect Conrad Cobden Dornbusch on 19 September 1908 for £1,150. The large block of land on which Hillside was situated was gradually subdivided and from the original 16-acre (6.5 ha) lot only 1 hectare (2.5 acres) remains around the house.

== Description ==
Hillside is a substantial sandstone residence located on a prominent site in Warwick, overlooking the township from the nearby Glennie Heights.

Hillside comprises an 1860s sandstone section which is approximately half of the present house, and subsequent timber and sandstone extensions. The house is surrounded on three sides by a verandah, whose awning is discrete from the corrugated iron hipped roof of the central body of the building where there is terracotta ridge and hip flashing. Two sandstone chimney shafts extend through the roof.

The northern elevation, where the principal entrance doorway is located, comprises the early sandstone section to the east, and a weatherboard and sandstone addition to the west, which infills the early verandah space. The early entrance doorway is centrally located on the facade, to the north of the 1860s section of the building. This timber framed doorway, features a transom and side lights of etched glass. The four panelled and moulded timber door, housed here, has the two upper panels replaced with glass.

Running along the entire length of the eastern facade is a verandah, supported on stop chamfered timber posts, rectangular in section, with simple capitals and bases. The facade of the building is punctuated with five, irregularly spaced, French doors which are fully glazed within a cedar frame, with side opening transom lights above. Shade is provided to the openings with full length timber shutters. The soffit of the verandah is unlined with principal edge rolled framing members, and the floor is timber boarding, with chamfered weatherboards on the faces of the base of the building. Access is provided to the verandah from the terrace via three sandstone steps flanked by low sandstone walls.

The southern elevation, originally verandahed, is now largely the later section of the building, with roughly tooled and margined sandstone to the underside of the window sills and vertical timber boarding above.

The western sections of Hillside are largely recent works, with rooms constructed to the west of the early house and a wing adjoining the building to the south west. These additions have been added in weatherboard and sandstone at various times and enclose a small central courtyard.

Internally the building comprises the 1860s section, including the central hallway and three room to the east of this; and the later additions to the south and west of the central hallway. The hallway, which runs north south for the length of the house from the principal entrance on the north of the building. The hallway has a beaded board ceiling and slab floor and is divided into three areas with transverse plastered sandstone walls, with timber framed four panelled cedar doors, demarcating the entrance, formal and rear zones of the house. Housed in the hallway is an early fitted cedar cupboard.

Provision is given from the central section of the hallway to a dining/drawing room separated by a three leaf folding door. These rooms have beaded board ceilings, small moulded cornices and frieze rails, high cedar skirting boards and rendered walls. Both rooms feature polished cedar chimney pieces, with timber corbels supporting the mantle. French doors provide access to the verandah on the east of these rooms. Further along the hallway, in the rear section a doorway leads to a small room, seemingly the former study, which has similar but simpler details than those found in the drawing/dining rooms.

A looped driveway provides access to the house from Weewondilla Road, the central lawned section of which is planted with native trees and plants. To the east of the house, overlooking Warwick, is a multi-tiered terrace garden, edged with sandstone and concrete walls. A feature of the southern garden is a paved sandstone semi-circular seating area adjacent to the terrace retaining wall, in which there is an outdoor cooking alcove. Another feature of the grounds is a trellised walkway to the west of the house.

== Heritage listing ==
Hillside was listed on the Queensland Heritage Register on 21 October 1992 having satisfied the following criteria.

The place is important in demonstrating the evolution or pattern of Queensland's history.

Hillside demonstrates the development of Warwick and the growth of the Anglican Church in regional Queensland. As one of the oldest sandstone residences in Warwick, it pre-empts the tradition of sandstone building in the town.

The place is important in demonstrating the principal characteristics of a particular class of cultural places.

The building is a good, yet incomplete, example of the domestic architecture of Benjamin Backhouse, and, of a colonial residence constructed during the 1860s.

The place is important because of its aesthetic significance.

The building is valued on aesthetic and architectural merit, as a substantial early residence.

The place has a strong or special association with a particular community or cultural group for social, cultural or spiritual reasons.

The building is valued by the local community, particularly the Anglican community, as the parsonage of the first resident priest in Warwick.

The place has a special association with the life or work of a particular person, group or organisation of importance in Queensland's history.

It has strong associations with Archdeacon Benjamin Glennie, a figure of importance in the early religious history of Queensland.
