= Emma H. Slade =

American clubwoman

President National, United States Daughters of 1812
- In office 1906–1915

President General of the National Society of New England Women
- In office 1895–1895

Personal details
- Born: Emma Maleen Hardy Lowell, Massachusetts, U.S.
- Died: September 5, 1925 New York, New York, U.S.
- Resting place: Mount Auburn Cemetery
- Spouse: William Gerry Slade
- Occupation: clubwoman

Emma Maleen Hardy Slade (died September 5, 1925), also known as Mrs. William Gerry Slade, was an American socialite and clubwoman who founded the National Society of New England Women and served as President National of the U.S. Daughters of 1812.

== Clubs and societies ==
Slade was a prominent clubwoman. She founded the National Society of New England Women in 1895. She was also a founder and president of the Order of the Americans of Armorial Ancestry.

Slade served as President of the New York State Society of the National of the U.S. Daughters of 1812 and as President National of the national society. In 1915, by the end of her administration, the U.S. Daughters of 1812 had formed 35 state societies with an enrollment of 3,758 members.

== Personal life, death, and legacy ==
She was married to William Gerry Slade. She died on September 5, 1925 at her apartment in the Waldorf-Astoria. She was buried next to her husband and her daughter at Mount Auburn Cemetery in Cambridge, Massachusetts.

She left more than $50,000 in a trust fund for a memorial to her daughter, Harriet Slade Crombie, at the University of Vermont. Slade bequeathed a watch and chain, given to her as founder of the National Society of New England Women, to Mrs. Cutler Whitwell. She also dictated that all of her documents related to the National Society of the United States Daughters of 1812 were to be placed in the society's room at the George Washington Memorial Building. Slade also gave a trust fund of $5,000 to Mrs. Jennie Snyder Cronk.
