= Woodlawn Cemetery (Clinton, Massachusetts) =

Historic cemetery in Massachusetts, United States

- U.S. National Register of Historic Places
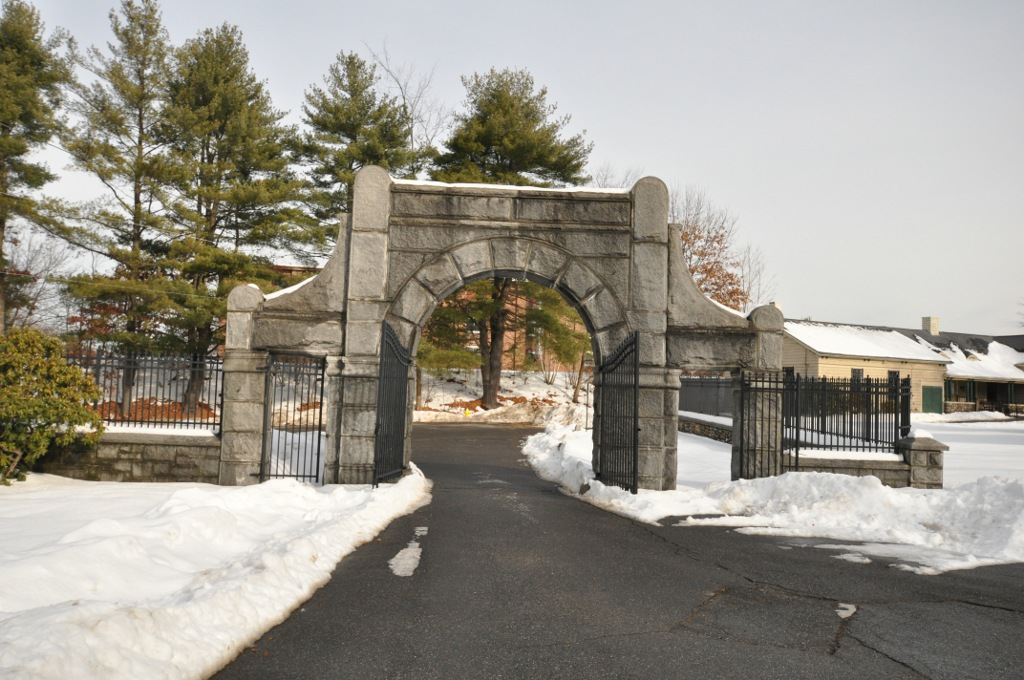
- The main gate

- Location within Massachusetts Location within the United States
- Location: Clinton, Massachusetts
- Coordinates: 42°25′10″N 71°41′29″W
- Built: 1852
- NRHP reference No.: 13000535
- Added to NRHP: July 23, 2013

Woodlawn Cemetery is a historic cemetery on Woodlawn Street in Clinton, Massachusetts. The oldest portion was laid out in 1853 by Joshua Thissell in the rural cemetery style popular at the time, and was one of the first municipal projects following the town's incorporation. It occupies a hilly parcel of over 33 acres (13 ha), about 1 mile (1.6 km) from the center of town. It was expanded twice, in the 1890s and in the 1920s. Prominent burials include Erastus and Horatio Bigelow, the town's early leading businessmen.

The cemetery was listed on the National Register of Historic Places on July 23, 2013.

== See also ==
- National Register of Historic Places listings in Worcester County, Massachusetts
