= Stewart Mitchell =

American poet

Robert Stewart Mitchell (November 25, 1892 – November 3, 1957) was an American poet, editor, and professor of English literature. Along with Gilbert Seldes, Mitchell’s editorship of The Dial magazine signaled a pivotal shift in content from political articles to aesthetics in art and literature.

== Early life ==
Mitchell was born November 25, 1892, in Cincinnati, Ohio. After graduating from Harvard University in 1916 he taught English literature at the University of Wisconsin. He resigned his position for political reasons, frustrated that he was forced to give a “politician’s son who should have been flunked” passing grades. Mitchell enlisted in the army, serving in France until he was discharged as a private two years later.

== Involvement with The Dial ==
Mitchell returned to the United States and was hired by Scofield Thayer and James Sibley Watson as managing editor of their joint project, The Dial. Mitchell, in association with Gilbert Seldes, was managing editor from 1919-1920. His appointment as editor marked a shift in the influential, modernist little magazine’s focus on politics to an artistic, literary theme.

Mitchell’s work for The Dial involved not only editing but, as was common with the majority of The Dial’s editors, active involvement with and submissions to the creative or literary content.

== Literary works ==
Mitchell’s associating with The Dial proved advantageous and profitable to his own literary career. He completed and sold a volume of poetry that was published in 1921. Several of the poems in his collection were first printed in The Dial. These were reprinted with permission from Scofield Thayer. Following Mitchell’s resignation as editor Mitchell continued to submit book reviews as well as poetry.

== Further education, The New England Quarterly, and the Massachusetts Historical Society ==
His desire to travel led Mitchell to give up editorship of The Dial and pursue further education abroad. In 1922, following two years’ study at the University of Montpellier and Jesus College, Cambridge, he returned to the States and lived with his elderly aunt in New York. Mitchell privately studied foreign language and literature, focusing on French and Greek, before returning to Harvard and graduating with a Ph.D. in Literature in 1933.

While completing his degree he also worked as editor for the New England Quarterly in 1928. The following year he gave up his position to become editor for the Massachusetts Historical Society. It was as a historical editor that Mitchell, according to his associates, truly excelled. His "naturally keen memory and sharp eye, coupled with a sure ear for words and an occasionally brilliant wit, permitted him to excel." After eleven years' service he resigned but was recalled in 1947 as Director and editor.

== Personal life and death ==
Mitchell's long-time partner was Richard David Cowan (1909-1939), a student of Cornell University in the 1920s who met Mitchell in the 1930s and they lived together since then.

Mitchell died in Brookline, Massachusetts, on November 3, 1957, and was buried at Mount Auburn Cemetery, Cambridge, Massachusetts, alongside Richard Cowan.
