= Sarah S. Jacobs =

American writer and record clerk

Sarah S. Jacobs (1813–1902) was an American writer and chief record clerk from Rhode Island. After relocating to Cambridge, Massachusetts, she authored books for the Massachusetts Sabbath School Society, including Nonantum and Natick and The white oak and its neighbors. For 40 years, she was a clerk in the Cambridge city clerk's office and was also involved in local educational matters, serving on the school board. She contributed to the publication of the city's old records and her poetry was included in Griswold's Female Poets of America.

== Biography ==
Sarah Sprague Jacobs was born in Rhode Island, 1813. Her parents was Rev. Bela Jacobs, a Baptist clergyman, and Sarah Sally (Sprague) Jacobs.

From Rhode Island, Jacobs removed to Cambridge, Massachusetts.

Nonantum and Natick (1853) and The white oak and its neighbors (1858) were both written for the Massachusetts Sabbath School Society. Some of her poems were brought together in Female Poets of America, edited by Rufus Wilmot Griswold. Her poems were serious and fanciful. "Benedetta" was one of her happiest compositions, and it is characteristic of her most usual tone and manner. There was no collection of her writings.

Justin A. Jacobs, Sarah's brother, served as Cambridge city clerk from 1857 to 1887. For 40 years, Sarah was an assistant in the city clerk's office, relinquishing her duties about 1899 on account of ill health. She acted as chief record clerk most of that time.

She had an extensive knowledge of particular local history, and her services were sought after by historical writers. She had a large share in the issue of the old records, under the direction of City Clerk Edward J. Brandon, preparing the copy and reading the proofs for the Proprietors' Records (1635–1829), published in 1896, and the town records (1630–1703) published in 1901.

She was interested in educational matters, and was fond of Cambridge institutions, retaining her interest up to the time of her last illness. She was a member of the school board from 1880 to 1887.

Sarah Jacobs died in Cambridge, Massachusetts, May 14, 1902. Burial was at Mount Auburn Cemetery.

== Selected works ==
=== Books ===
- Memoir of Rev. Bela Jacobs, A. M.: Compiled Chiefly from His Letters and Journals, by his Daughter, 1837 (text)
- Nonantum and Natick, 1853
- The white oak and its neighbors, 1858
- Providence directory, 1858

=== Poems ===
- "A Vesper"
- "Benedetta"
- "The Changeless World"
- "Ubi Amor, Ibi Fides"
