= Massasoit Guards =

Petition to the Massachusetts legislature to form a military company called the "Massasoit Guards." Signed by John P. Coburn, Robert Morris, John S. Rock, Lewis Hayden, and others.

The Massasoit Guards were an African-American militia company active in 1850s Boston. Clothing retailer John P. Coburn founded the group to police Beacon Hill and protect residents from slave catchers. Attorney Robert Morris repeatedly petitioned the Massachusetts legislature on their behalf, but the Massasoit Guards were never officially recognized or supported by the state. The group was a precursor to the 54th Massachusetts Regiment.

== History ==
=== Founding ===
After Congress passed the Fugitive Slave Law of 1850, Boston and other Northern cities were no longer safe havens for refugees from slavery. Black communities began forming independent militias to protect residents from slave catchers: the Attucks Guards in New York City, the Hannibal Guards in Pittsburgh, the Detroit Military Guards, and many others. In Boston, the first black militia was called the Massasoit Guards.

The group was founded in 1854 by John Coburn, a Beacon Hill clothing retailer and co-owner of a profitable gaming house. Coburn was a member of the Boston Vigilance Committee and treasurer of the New England Freedom Association, both organizations dedicated to helping fugitive slaves. Coburn also personally served as captain of the Massasoit Guards. The unit was named for Massasoit, a 17th-century Wampanoag leader. Abolitionist William Cooper Nell remarked on the choice of name in 1855:

Perhaps, as the name of Attucks has already been appropriated by colored military companies in New York and Cincinnati, they accepted Massasoit as their patron saint. He was one of those Indian chiefs, who, in early colonial times, proved himself signally friendly to the interests of the Old Bay State.

That same year, the editor of the Boston Evening Telegraph questioned the wisdom of creating an all-black company:

And we are somewhat at a loss to see why our colored friends, who so reasonably objected to being set apart as a class in the schools, should now voluntarily set themselves apart as a class in the military.

The group may have come together informally before 1854. According to historian Mary Ellen Snodgrass, several members of the Massasoit Guards were involved in the rescue of Shadrach Minkins in 1851. Minkins had escaped slavery in Virginia and was working in Boston when he was arrested by federal marshals and imprisoned in the court house. A group of about 20 black activists led by Lewis Hayden stormed the court house and rescued Minkins by force. John Coburn was among those arrested in connection with the rescue, but was acquitted of all charges.

=== Legal struggles ===
During the mid-1850s, attorney Robert Morris repeatedly petitioned to include the Massasoit Guards in the Massachusetts Volunteer Militia, and to have the word "white" stricken from the state's militia law. At the time, federal militia law as well as Massachusetts state law stipulated that only white men could serve. Many whites were threatened by the thought of black men being provided with weapons and military training. Denied the use of state weapons, the Guards purchased their own gear and continued to operate outside the law for several years.

Morris and other advocates emphasized that blacks were native-born American citizens, unlike the immigrants who, at that time, were arriving in large numbers at the Port of Boston. Morris once remarked before the legislature's militia committee, "Some of the petitioners whom I have the honor to represent, can trace back their ancestry to a time long before an Englishman or any white foreigner stood upon American ground." William J. Watkins was more explicit: "All we ask is that you treat us as well as you do the Irish, German, Hungarian." Despite the appeal to nativism, which was on the rise in Massachusetts, their petitions were denied. Eventually the Massasoit Guards gave up in frustration and disbanded.

== See also ==
- 54th Massachusetts Regiment
- Military history of African Americans
- History of African Americans in Boston
- Montgomery Guards
