= John J. Fatal =

American politician

- Born: 1816; Newburyport, Massachusetts
- Died: March 18, 1904 (aged 88); Cambridge, Massachusetts
- Known for: Abolitionism

John J. Fatal (1816-1904) was an American abolitionist and the first person of color to be nominated for the Common Council of Cambridge, Massachusetts.

== Biography ==
He was born in Newburyport, Massachusetts. His father was from Martinique and his mother was from Guadeloupe. As a young man he was a member of the Boston Vigilance Committee, and helped refugees from slavery escape to Canada via the Underground Railroad. He was involved in the rescue of George Latimer, whose case became a major political issue in Massachusetts. With Joshua Bowen Smith and William Cooper Nell, he was prominent in the movement to desegregate the Boston public schools.

In 1859 he moved from Boston to Cambridge, where he lived the rest of his life. He was the first person of color to be nominated for the Cambridge Common Council. He declined, clearing the way for his friend J. Milton Clarke, who became the first African American to serve on the Council. In 1874, against his wishes, Fatal was elected to the Council, where he served a term of one year. Afterwards he worked for the United States subtreasury for 25 years. He also owned a home furnishings store.

He married four times; his fourth wife died circa 1897. All of his Martinique relatives were killed in the eruption of Mount Pelée in 1902. He was survived by an adopted daughter who was living in Worcester, Massachusetts, at the time of his death.

A plaque in his honor was installed at his former home at 49 Lincoln Street in Cambridge, Massachusetts, by the Cambridge African American History Project.
