= William I. Bowditch =

American abolitionist and suffragist (1819–1909)

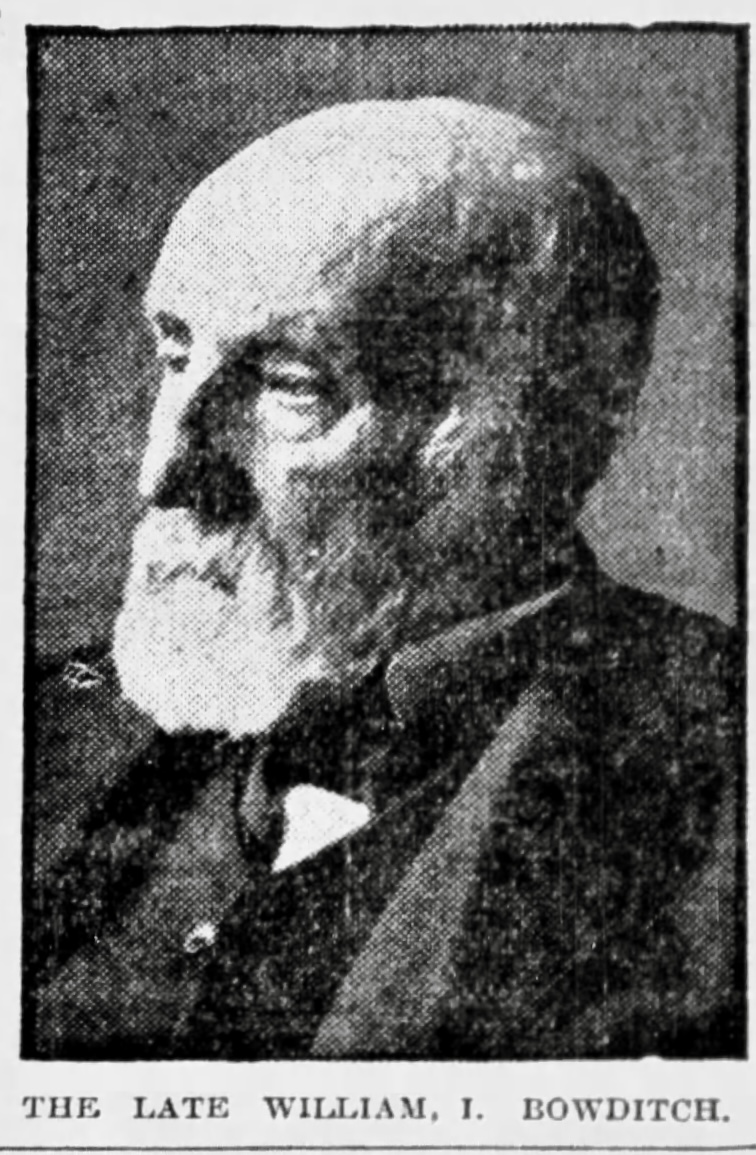
- Boston Globe, Jan. 25, 1909
- Born: August 5, 1819; Salem, Massachusetts, U.S.
- Died: January 24, 1909 (aged 89); Brookline, Massachusetts, U.S.
- Occupations: Lawyer, writer

William Ingersoll Bowditch (August 5, 1819 – January 24, 1909) was an American lawyer, writer, abolitionist, and suffragist from Massachusetts. The landmarked William Ingersoll Bowditch House in Brookline, Massachusetts, was a station on the Underground Railroad prior to the American Civil War. One historian has argued that "From 1835 to 1860 the history of the moral movement against slavery in America is the history of William Lloyd Garrison and his great coadjutors like Wendell Phillips, Theodore D. Weld, Parker Pillsbury, Frederick Douglass, Theodore Parker, Lucretia Mott, Stephen and Abby Kelly Foster, the sisters Grimké, Samuel E. Sewall, Ellis Gray Loring, Maria Weston Chapman, David Lee and Lydia Maria Child, Francis Jackson, Samuel J. May, Samuel May, Edmund Quincy, Henry I. and William I. Bowditch, and Lucy Stone." Another history describes Bowditch as the "leading Constitutional scholar" among the abolitionists. In 1849 Bowditch wrote that the U.S. Constitution was a radically pro-slavery document.

== Life and career ==
Bowditch was the seventh of the eight children of astronomer, mathematician, and actuary Nathaniel Bowditch and his wife Mary Ingersoll. His older brother Henry Ingersoll Bowditch (1808–1891) was a doctor and Harvard Medical School professor who also heavily involved in the abolitionist movement. William I. Bowditch graduated Harvard, class of 1838 (along with James Russell Lowell and W. W. Story), and graduated Harvard Law in 1841. He spent most of his professional life as a conveyancer (a subfield of real estate law), and as an estate trustee. In 1844 he married Sarah Rhea Higginson, who was said to always be "in hearty sympathy with her husband's reform work."

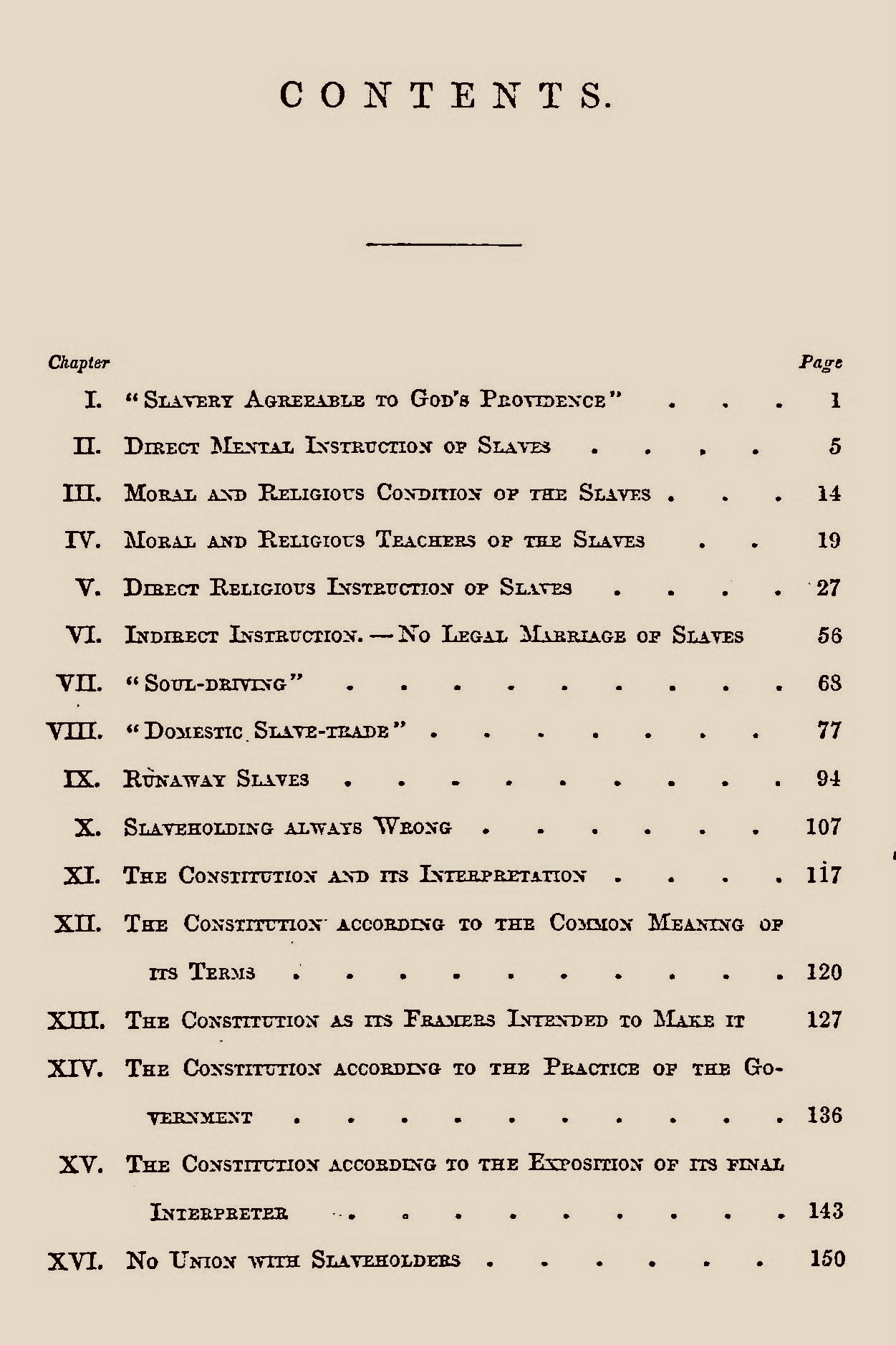
Table of contents of Slavery and the Constitution (1849), published when Bowditch was 30 years old

Bowditch began his involvement in the abolitionist movement around 1841 when he got to know Ellis Gray Loring, Samuel Philbrick, and William P. Atkinson. When Ellen and William Craft escaped north in 1848, the first place they stayed in Brookline was Bowditch's house, before they had to be relocated for their own security. In 1854, Bowditch, Loring, and Martin Kennard were among the members of the Boston Vigilance Committee, which was devoted to protecting fugitive slaves. For example, "When a slave rescued from the brig Cameo and hid in Lewis Hayden's house in Boston was reported discovered, Mr. Bowditch drove in with his carryall, helped to disguise the fugitive in women's clothes and with Austin Bearse drove the frightened Negro to Concord at night. There he was entrusted to Judge Brooks, a sympathizer, and Mr. Bowditch returned to Brookline for breakfast. Many another runaway passed through his hands, aided by friendly counsel, money, and heroic personal exertion. His efforts were, however, by no means confined to furthering escape, for he was active in winning public support for the abolitionist cause. Frequent meetings were held between 1854 and 1860, announced by notices which Mr. Bowditch tacked up along Walnut Street and near Coolidge Corner...in the hope that as many as half of them would survive the efforts of the vandals who sought to tear them down." During this period he was also the author of Slavery and the Constitution (1849), The Rendition of Anthony Burns (1854), and shorter pamphlets published by the American Anti-Slavery Society, including The anti-slavery reform: its principle and method.

After the raid on Harper's Ferry, one of John Brown's surviving sons "sought and found refuge at the home of Mr. Bowditch in Brookline. It is said that his extensive armament frightened the maid servant, and that Mr. Bowditch assured Brown that such defenses were not needed. 'Perhaps not,' he answered, 'but it is safer. I am resolved never to be taken alive.' He was unmolested while he remained in Brookline." In 1860, Bowditch served one term on the executive board of the American Anti-Slavery Society. In 1893 he responded to a letter inquiring about the history of the Underground Railroad in Massachusetts, writing:

Dear Sir: In reply to the question contained in your letter of Mar. 28, last, I would say: We had no regular route and no regular station in Massachusetts. I have had several fugitives in my house. Generally I passed them on Wm. Jackson at Newton. His house being on the Worcester Railroad, he could easily forward any one. One person, I (with others) drove to Concord in a two horse carry-all, and deposited him with Mrs. Brooks, the mother of Judge Geo. M. Brooks. Sometimes we rescued them from the ships in the harbor. I have had in my house Wm. and Ellen Craft, John Brown Jr., Henry (Box) Brown, and others ... Respectfully yours, Wm. I. Bowditch

Bowditch was perennially selected as moderator of Brookline town meetings for many years. Beginning in the 1870s, Bowditch worked to promote votes for women. His pamphlet Taxation of Women in Massachusetts (1875) is described as an "impressive document" that makes "no taxation without representation" arguments in favor of woman suffrage. Another pamphlet was called The Right to Govern Ourselves, and together they showed "that about 16 percent of the real estate of the commonwealth" was then owned by women, who did not have commensurate political power; at the time of his death a eulogist commented, "He wrote a spirited appeal against this injustice, entitled, 'How long shall we rob and enslave women?' A question not yet answered." He also served as president of the Massachusetts Woman Suffrage Association from 1878 to 1891, according to History of Woman Suffrage, 1883–1900. Another account lists him as successor to Rev. Dr. James Freeman Clarke as president of the Massachusetts Woman Suffrage Association, serving for seven years. According to a history of Brookline, "Far-seeing William I. Bowditch moved the annual meeting in 1881, 'That the town ask the Legislature to extend to women who are citizens the right to hold office and to vote in town affairs on the same terms as male citizens.'" The motion was apparently unsuccessful. Bowditch was further confounded by the electoral slate for the 1882 Massachusetts gubernatorial election, stating, "I cannot vote for Bishop, because he is opposed to woman suffrage; I cannot vote for Almy, because I am opposed to prohibition; and I will not vote for Butler, because I would as soon vote for the devil."

Bowditch died at his home in Massachusetts in 1909 after an illness of about three months. Bowditch was buried at Mount Auburn Cemetery. Bowditch was survived by his wife and five children. His will included cash bequests to Alice Stone Blackwell and Booker T. Washington. He was remembered by Henry Browne Blackwell in Woman's Journal: "With strong convictions and emphatic expression, Mr. Bowditch was a man of sterling integrity and warm affections. My daughter and myself once had the privilege of being the guests of Mr. and Mrs. Bowditch for ten days, at their beautiful woodland home on Lake Chateaugay, in the heart of the Adirondacks, where we greatly enjoyed their reminiscences of 'the times that tried men's souls.'"

== Selected works ==
- Bowditch, William I. (September 1848). Emerson, Ralph Waldo; Parker, Theodore; Cabot, J. Elliot (eds.). "Constitutionality of Slavery". Massachusetts Quarterly Review (IV). Boston: Coolidge & Wiley: 463–508.

== See also ==
- Oliver Johnson (writer)
- Anthony Burns
