= William Ingersoll Bowditch House =

Historic house in Massachusetts, United States

- U.S. National Register of Historic Places
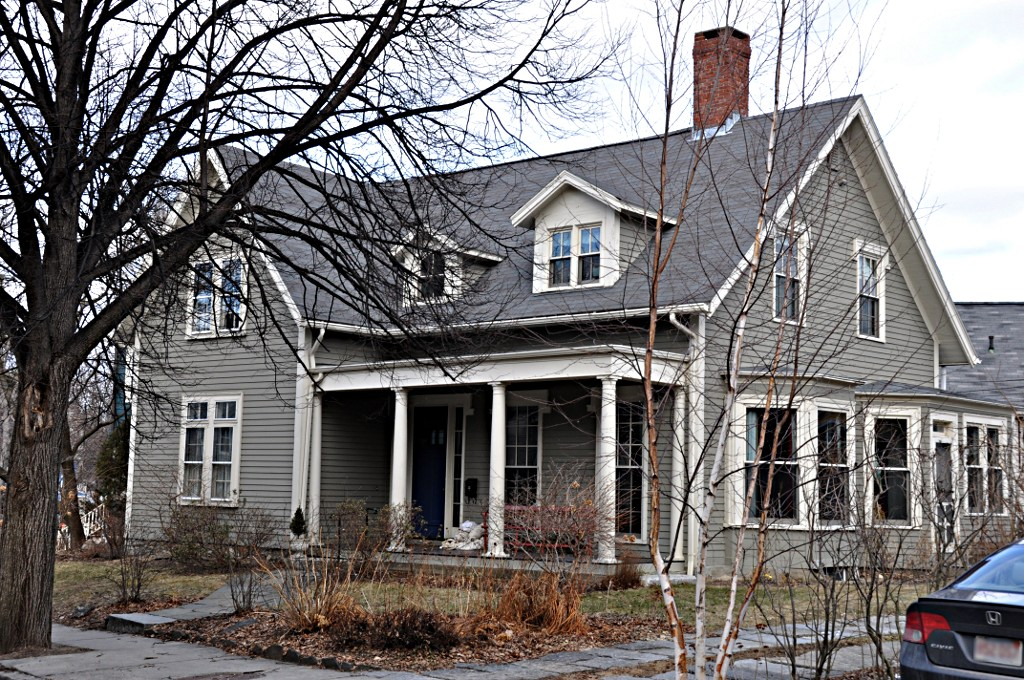

- Location within Massachusetts Location within the United States
- Location: 9 Toxteth St., Brookline, Massachusetts
- Coordinates: 42°20′8″N 71°7′1″W
- Area: less than one acre
- Built: 1844
- Architectural style: Greek Revival, Gothic Revival
- MPS: Brookline MRA
- NRHP reference No.: 85003249
- Added to NRHP: October 17, 1985

The William Ingersoll Bowditch House is a historic house at 9 Toxteth Street in Brookline, Massachusetts. It is a good example of vernacular Gothic and Greek Revival architecture, built c. 1844-45 as part of one of Brookline's earliest formal residential subdivisions. William Bowditch, the first owner, was an active abolitionist who sheltered fugitive slaves as part of the Underground Railroad, and was a member of the Boston Vigilance Committee. The house was listed on the National Register of Historic Places on October 17, 1985.

== Description and history ==
The William Ingersoll Bowditch House stands in a residential area northeast of the commercial area of Brookline Village, on the east side of Toxteth Street near its southern end. It faces west toward Linden Square. It is a 1 1/2-story wood-frame structure, with an L-shaped plan, cross-gabled roof, and clapboarded exterior. A single-story shed-roof porch is located in the crook of the L. The windows under the porch are of full length, and the main entrance, also under the porch, has flanking full-length sidelight windows. Window openings are framed by drip moulding, and the roof is adorned with dormers that have steeply pitched roofs in the Gothic style.

The Linden Square area was subdivided in the 1840s by Thomas Aspinwall Davis on family farmland, its layout designed by Alexander Wadsworth. This house was built on land from several parcels in the subdivision in 1844-45 for William Ingersoll Bowditch, who lived here until 1867. Bowditch was active in local politics, serving on the board of selectmen and as moderator of the town meeting. Before the American Civil War he was an ardent abolitionist, serving on the Boston Vigilance Committee, which assisted fugitive slaves. Bowditch is documented to have sheltered at least one fugitive couple, and also hosted the son of John Brown.

== See also ==
- National Register of Historic Places listings in Brookline, Massachusetts
- "Slavery and the Constitution by William Ingersoll Bowditch".
