= Centerville Historic District (Barnstable, Massachusetts) =

Historic district in Massachusetts, United States

- U.S. National Register of Historic Places
- U.S. Historic district
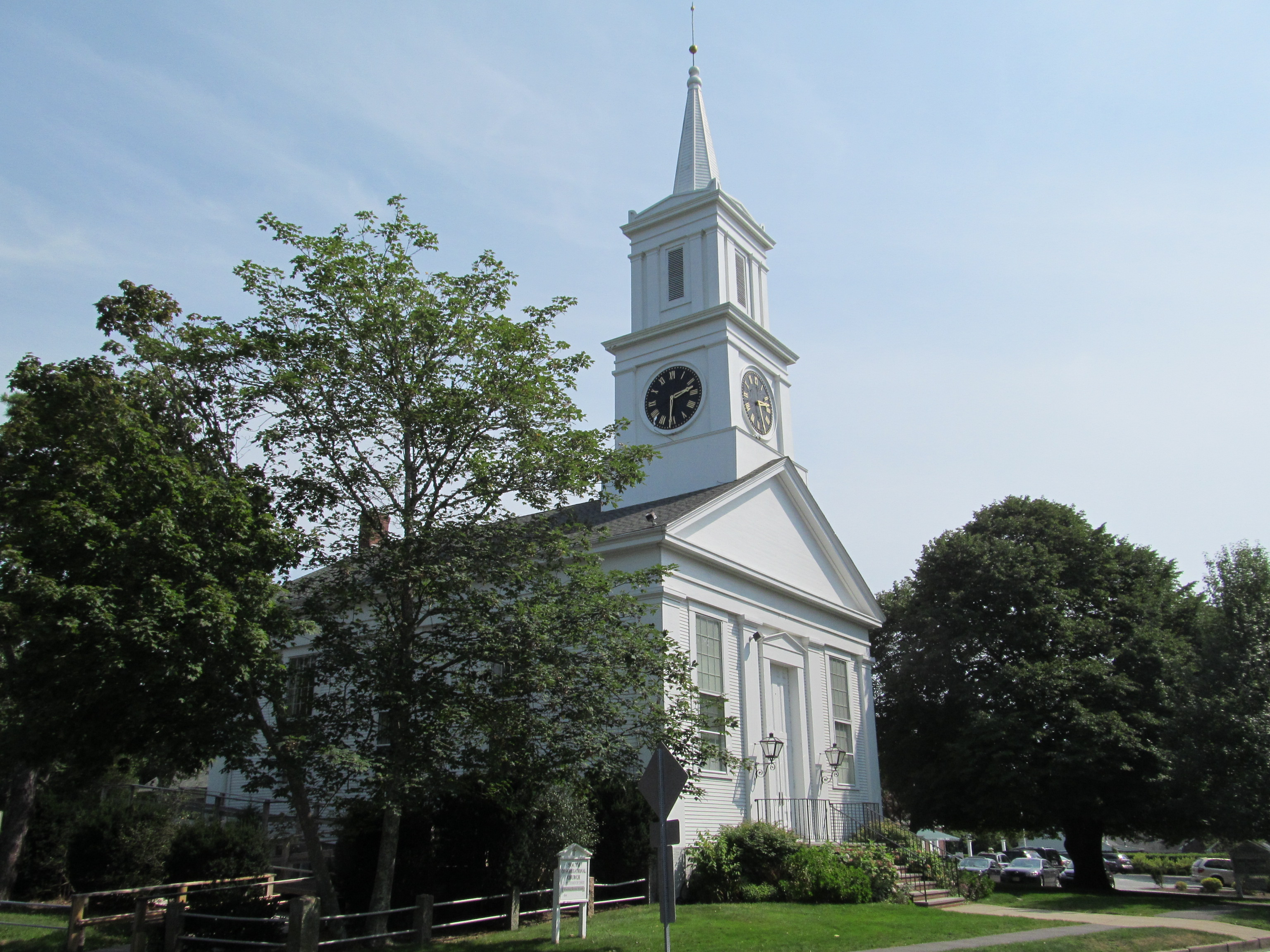
- South Congregational Church

- Location within Cape Cod Location within Massachusetts Location within the United States
- Location: Barnstable, Massachusetts
- Coordinates: 41°38′56″N 70°20′53″W
- Built: 1826
- Architectural style: Greek Revival, Late Victorian
- MPS: Barnstable MRA
- NRHP reference No.: 87002587
- Added to NRHP: November 10, 1987

The Centerville Historic District is a historic district encompassing the heart of the village of Centerville in Barnstable, Massachusetts. The district extends along Main Street from a point north of its junction with Old Stage Road and Park Avenue, south to the junction with Church Hill Road. Most of the buildings in the district were built in the middle decades of the 19th century, although its oldest building, the Austin Bearse House, was built c. 1690. The area's growth was spurred by the relocation in 1826 of the Congregational Church building to its present location. The district was listed on the National Register of Historic Places in 1987.

== Description ==
The Centerville Historic District is located in southern Barnstable, roughly midway between the villages of Hyannis and Cotuit. The district is essentially linear in shape, extending along Main Street from just south of Wilton Drive to a four-way junction with Church Hill Road and Bacon Lane, with a major triangular intersection with Park Street near the district's geographic center. It includes 40 historically significant buildings dating to the 19th century or earlier, and includes a significant concentration of buildings that are either Greek Revival or Italianate, architectural styles that were popular in the mid-19th century. Most buildings are 1-1/2 to 2-1/2 story wood frame houses. Buildings of note that fall outside of these general categories include the c. 1880 Benjamin Childs House (339 Main), one of the only Second Empire houses in Barnstable, and the Marston family houses, a pair of Queen Anne Victorians at 454 and 481 Main Street, and the Centerville General Store, a vernacular structure built c. 1834.

There are two churches in the district. One, the Congregation Church at the southern end of the district, was built in 1797 and moved to its present location in 1826, an event that (along with an increase in maritime-related economic activity) stimulated development of this area in preference to Centerville's traditional center to the north. The other church building, originally built in 1876 for a Methodist congregation, has been substantially altered and is no longer historically significant. The triangular park at the junction of Park and Main includes two war memorials, one to the community's Civil War soldiers (placed in 1866), and a World War I memorial placed c. 1920.

== See also ==
- National Register of Historic Places listings in Barnstable County, Massachusetts
