= Boston Vigilance Committee =

US abolitionist organization

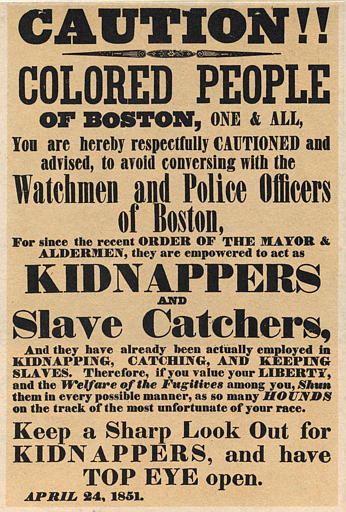
- An 1851 poster warning the "colored people of Boston" about policemen acting as slave catchers, pursuant to the Fugitive Slave Law of 1850. Broadside printed by Benjamin Roberts for the Boston Vigilance Committee (Boston Public Library, Rare Books and Manuscripts Department, H.90.293).
- Formation: 1841
- Founder: Charles Turner Torrey
- Dissolved: 1861; 165 years ago
- Purpose: Protecting fugitive slaves from being returned to slavery
- Headquarters: Boston, Massachusetts
- Affiliations: Underground Railroad

The Boston Vigilance Committee (1841–1861) was an abolitionist organization formed in Boston, Massachusetts, to protect escaped slaves from being kidnapped and returned to slavery in the South. The Committee aided hundreds of escapees, most of whom arrived as stowaways on coastal trading vessels and stayed a short time before moving on to Canada or England. Notably, members of the Committee provided legal and other aid to George Latimer, Ellen and William Craft, Shadrach Minkins, Thomas Sims, and Anthony Burns.

Members coordinated with donors and Underground Railroad conductors to provide escapees with funds, shelter, medical attention, legal counsel, transportation, and sometimes weapons. They kept an eye out for slave catchers, and spread the word when any came to town. Some members took part in violent rescue efforts.

== History ==
=== Founding (1841) ===
The Boston Vigilance Committee was formed on June 4, 1841, in response to a public call issued by Charles Turner Torrey and several other signers. The founding meeting was held in the Marlboro Chapel on Washington Street, near Boston Common. According to William Cooper Nell, those present at the first meeting represented "various classes of our citizens, white and colored, (the latter of whom were quite numerous,) persons of different religious persuasions," members of other anti-slavery organizations, and "friends of the oppressed colored man" who were not yet affiliated with any such groups. The original officers were Francis Jackson, Chairman; Charles T. Torrey, Secretary; and Joseph Southwick, Treasurer. The original Executive Committee was composed of Daniel Mann, Benjamin Weeden, Curtis C. Nichols, Thomas Jinnings Jr., William Cooper Nell, J. P. Bishop, John Rogers, and S. R. Alexander.

A constitution was adopted that same evening, the first article of which stated the group's purpose:

The object of this Association shall be to secure to persons of color the enjoyment of their constitutional and legal rights. To secure this object, it will employ every legal, peaceful, and Christian method, and none other.

By the end of 1841, Torrey had tired of the slow pace of political abolitionism and moved to Washington, D.C.; within a few years he would be dead in prison, having helped free hundreds of slaves in the Washington area. In 1842, the Supreme Court ruled in Prigg v. Pennsylvania that the federal Fugitive Slave Act nullified any free-state laws protecting fugitive slaves. This would have made it harder for the Boston Vigilance Committee to be effective without breaking the law. Soon afterwards, several black Bostonians formed the New England Freedom Association, which did not commit itself to operating strictly within the law. Both groups held strategy meetings in the African Meeting House on Beacon Hill. The New England Freedom Association eventually merged with the Boston Vigilance Committee.

In the fall of 1842, attorney Samuel E. Sewall defended George Latimer, who had escaped slavery in Virginia and was arrested in Boston. When Sewall lost the case, he and others purchased Latimer's freedom.

Four years later, abolitionists learned that a fugitive slave was being held on a ship in Boston Harbor, but were unable to rescue him. According to one historian, this event triggered the formation of the Boston Vigilance Committee. It is not clear whether the committee that formed in 1846 was entirely new or a revival of the existing committee. Records show 19 fugitives from the South applying to the committee for financial and legal aid from 1846 to 1847. It may have disbanded in 1847 when no new attempts were made to arrest fugitive slaves in Boston.

=== Reorganization (1850) ===
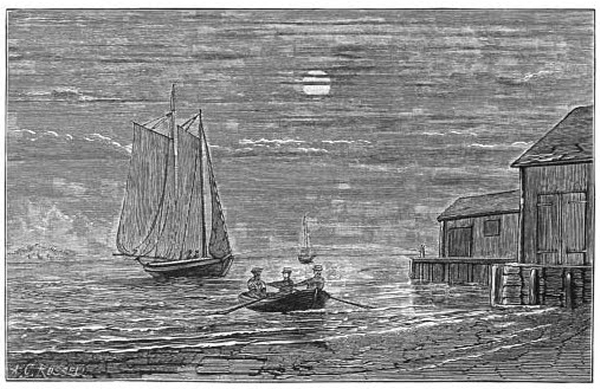
"Landing a fugitive slave at Drake's Wharf, South Boston, from the Yacht 'Moby Dick,' Capt. Austin Bearse, on the night of July 18, 1853" by A.C. Rosser

On September 18, 1850, Congress passed the Fugitive Slave Act of 1850, requiring free states to assist with the capture and return of fugitive slaves. On October 4, the Boston Vigilance Committee called a public meeting in Faneuil Hall to discuss how to respond. Noted abolitionists Frederick Douglass and Theodore Parker addressed the crowd, which was one of the largest ever convened in the hall. This meeting is often referred to as the first or founding meeting. Presumably, many new members were unaware of the original committee's existence.

The new officers were Timothy Gilbert, President; Charles List, Secretary; and Francis Jackson, Treasurer. The Executive Committee was composed of Theodore Parker, Joshua Bowen Smith, Lewis Hayden, Samuel G. Howe, Wendell Phillips, Edmund Jackson, Charles M. Ellis, and Charles K. Whipple. On the Finance Committee were Robert E. Apthorp, Henry I. Bowditch, William W. Marjoram, Samuel E. Sewall, John A. Andrew, Ellis Gray Loring, Robert Morris, and former chairman Francis Jackson.

The Committee was racially integrated and had over 200 members. Many were wealthy elites whose main contribution was funding. Those who provided more hands-on assistance included, among others, Lewis Hayden, who helped rescue Shadrach Minkins from federal custody in 1851; John Swett Rock, the committee's medical officer; and Austin Bearse, a ship captain who smuggled fugitives in and out of Boston. Several members, such as Richard Henry Dana Jr. and Samuel Edmund Sewall, were lawyers who defended fugitive slaves and their allies in court. At least three were also members of the Secret Six, who funded John Brown's raid on Harper's Ferry: preachers Thomas Wentworth Higginson and Theodore Parker, and physician Samuel Gridley Howe. Rev. Joshua Young, who later would be reviled for presiding at the funeral for John Brown, was a member. Apparently the Committee had no women members; the New England Freedom Association, by contrast, had two women officers.

Many locals who were not members provided aid to escapees and were reimbursed by the Committee. For example, the Committee's expense ledger shows several payments to the Reverend Leonard Grimes of the Twelfth Baptist Church for passage fees, and one payment of $9 to George Latimer for "six days watching Jn. Caphart." John Caphart was a notorious slave catcher.

Although the committee was interracial, it never had more than eight black members. (Note: African-American members included John P. Coburn, Lewis Hayden, John T. Hilton, Joel W. Lewis, Robert Morris, William Cooper Nell, John Swett Rock, Joshua Bowen Smith, and Isaac H. Snowden. They were not necessarily all members at the same time. According to Benjamin Quarles, the New England Freedom Association eventually merged with the Boston Vigilance Committee, which would have added quite a few more black men to the list, such as John J. Smith. Presumably, the association's female members were excluded.) With a few exceptions, the white members tended to be more cautious than the black members, preferring to supply legal and financial aid while black Bostonians did most of the actual relief work behind the scenes. Higginson later complained in his memoir that "half of them were non-resistants," prone to indecision and inertia. Black Bostonians had more at stake, and were more willing to use force to achieve their ends.

Vigilance committees such as Boston's were not uncommon in the years leading up to the American Civil War. Boston's was unusual in that its treasurer kept detailed records for the years 1850 to 1861. For example, one entry for December 26, 1850, reads, "Isabella S. Holmes, boarding Geo. Newton, Fugitive, $3.43." This was extremely risky given that such activities were illegal at the time, and punishable by jail time and stiff fines.

=== Ellen and William Craft ===
In 1848, William and Ellen Craft escaped slavery in Georgia and made their way to the North. Their daring escape was widely publicized by abolitionists, which made them more vulnerable to slave catchers. In 1850 they were living in Boston, where Ellen worked as a seamstress and William as a carpenter. After the Fugitive Slave Act passed in September, federal warrants were issued for them. Soon afterwards, two slave catchers from Georgia were spotted in Boston. William sent his wife to hide at the home of William I. Bowditch in Brookline, while he stayed with Lewis Hayden in Beacon Hill.

Other members of the committee, meanwhile, set to work harassing the two slave catchers, Willis Hughes and John Knight. They posted hundreds of handbills all over the city, describing the appearance of the two men. The lawyers had Hughes and Knight arrested again and again on various charges: slander (for claiming that William Craft had stolen the clothing in which he escaped), carrying concealed weapons, smoking in the street, swearing in public, and attempted kidnapping. Each time they were bailed out by pro-slavery sympathizers. On one occasion, as they emerged from the courtroom, they were mobbed by a crowd of black abolitionists, and fled in a carriage; they were then arrested for speeding, and for "running the toll when chased over Cambridge bridge."

The Crafts remained in hiding in Boston for several weeks, staying at various locations before fleeing to England in January. On November 7, 1850, they were married by Theodore Parker.

=== Shadrach Minkins ===
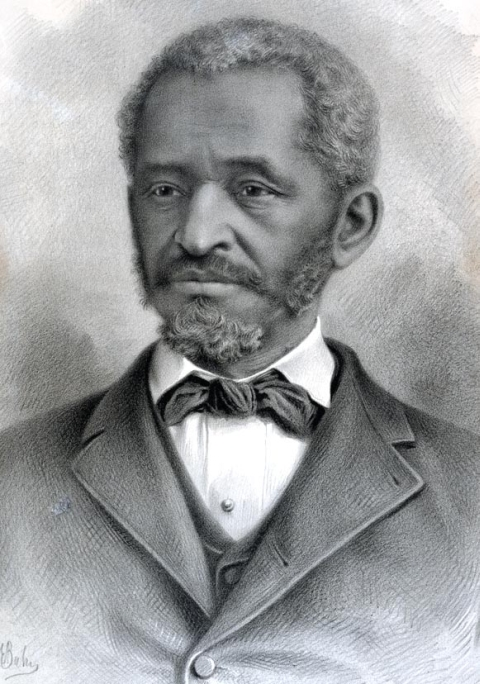
Lewis Hayden

In 1850, Shadrach Minkins escaped from slavery in Virginia and made his way to Boston, where he found work as a waiter. One morning in February 1851 he was serving breakfast when he was arrested by federal marshals and taken away to the federal courthouse in Boston. The Boston Vigilance Committee hired a team of lawyers to defend Minkins, including Richard Henry Dana Jr., Ellis Gray Loring, Robert Morris, and Samuel E. Sewall. Members posted handbills warning abolitionists that slave catchers had been seen in Boston. Protesters thronged in front of the courthouse, calling for Minkins' release.

On February 15, 1851, a group of about 20 black activists led by Lewis Hayden stormed the courthouse and released Minkins by force. Among them were John J. Smith, a Boston barber who would later become a Massachusetts state representative, and John P. Coburn, along with several of his men. Coburn was captain of the Massasoit Guards, a black militia company that was a precursor to the 54th Massachusetts Regiment. Minkins was carried off in a wagon to Beacon Hill, where he hid in an attic until nightfall, and was smuggled out of town. With the help of the Underground Railroad, he eventually made it to Canada.

At least three committee members were arrested for taking part in the rescue: Lewis Hayden, Robert Morris, and Elizur Wright. The Committee hired lawyers to defend them (and others), and all were acquitted. Wright, the only white man arrested, had not voluntarily taken part in the rescue, but had been standing in the courtroom when it happened and was swept along by the crowd.

=== Thomas Sims ===
Thomas Sims had escaped slavery in Georgia and was living in Boston when he was seized by federal marshals in 1851. The Committee hired attorney John Albion Andrew to advise him. Sims was locked in a room on the third floor of the federal courthouse. Committee members Lewis Hayden, Reverend Thomas Wentworth Higginson, and John Murray Spear, along with the Reverend Leonard A. Grimes, planned to place mattresses under Sims's cell window so he could jump out and make his getaway in a horse and chaise, but the sheriff barred the window before they could act.

The federal government sent U.S. Marines to march Sims down the streets of Boston, to be taken away on a warship and transferred back to Georgia. Sims was sold to a new slaveholder in Mississippi, but escaped in 1863 and returned to Boston.

=== Anthony Burns ===
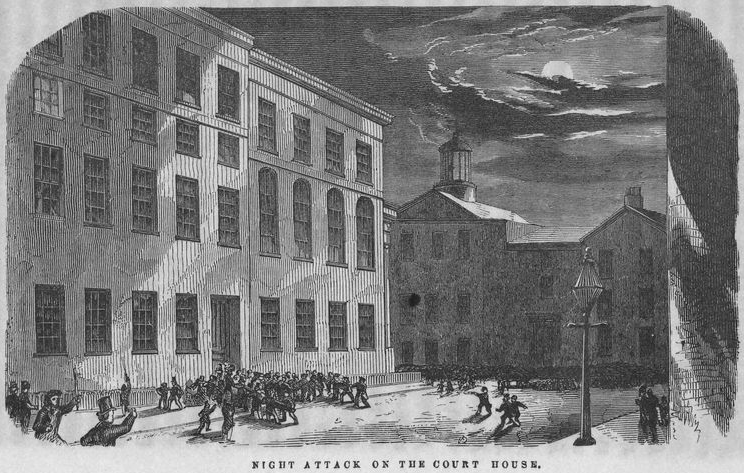
"Night Attack on the Court House", from Anthony Burns: A History by Charles E. Stevens

In 1853, Anthony Burns escaped slavery in Virginia and settled in Boston, where he found work in a clothing shop. In May of the following year, he was arrested and imprisoned in a room on an upper floor of the court house. Attorney John A. Albion led a team of Vigilance Committee lawyers in an unsuccessful defense. Wendell Phillips and Theodore Parker offered $1,300 for Burns's freedom, but were turned down.

That night, a mob led by Reverend Higginson attacked the courthouse with axes and beams. They broke down the southwest door of the courthouse and started up the stairs, but were confronted by armed guards. During the melee, marshal James Batchelder was shot and killed. Higginson came to believe his friend Martin Stowell was responsible, but fellow committee member William Francis Channing determined Batchelder was in fact killed by Lewis Hayden. When two regiments of troops from Fort Warren and the Charlestown Navy Yard arrived on the scene, the mob scattered, leaving Burns still trapped upstairs.

When the time came for Burns to be transported back to Virginia, Bostonians protested in the streets. The Vigilance Committee paid for "alarm banners" and "alarm bells" to be used in the demonstration, and distributed hundreds of abolitionist pamphlets and placards. They also circulated a petition for the removal of Judge Edward G. Loring (not to be confused with Ellis Gray Loring), who had ordered Burns's return to slavery. Loring was eventually removed from office by Governor Nathaniel Prentice Banks.

Weeks later, Higginson, Phillips, and Parker were charged with inciting a riot by making abolitionist speeches. The Committee hired lawyers to defend them and got the indictment quashed. Reverend Grimes and other abolitionists raised funds to purchase Burns's freedom, and he returned to Massachusetts.

=== Disbandment ===
According to Wilbur H. Siebert, the Boston Vigilance Committee ceased to exist ten years and seven months after the passage of the Fugitive Slave Law of 1850, which would mean it disbanded in April 1861.

== Notable members ==
A more complete list can be found in Austin Bearse's 1880 memoir, Reminiscences of Fugitive-Slave Law Days in Boston.

- Amos Bronson Alcott
- John A. Andrew
- Edward Atkinson
- John Augustus
- Austin Bearse
- John A. Bolles
- John Botume Jr.
- Thomas Tracy Bouvé
- Henry Ingersoll Bowditch
- William Ingersoll Bowditch
- Anson Burlingame
- Thomas Carew
- William Henry Channing
- John P. Coburn
- Nathaniel Colver
- Richard Henry Dana Jr.
- William Lloyd Garrison
- Timothy Gilbert
- Daniel W. Gooch
- Lewis Hayden
- Thomas Wentworth Higginson
- Richard Hildreth
- John T. Hilton
- Charles F. Hovey
- Samuel Gridley Howe
- Timothy W. Hoxie
- Francis Jackson
- William Jackson
- John P. Jewett
- Joel W. Lewis
- Ellis Gray Loring
- James Russell Lowell
- Bela Marsh
- Samuel May, Jr.
- Robert Morris
- William Cooper Nell
- Theodore Parker
- Wendell Phillips
- Henry Prentiss
- Edmund Quincy
- John Swett Rock
- Samuel E. Sewall
- Joshua Bowen Smith
- Isaac H. Snowden
- John Murray Spear
- Lysander Spooner
- Charles Turner Torrey
- Mark Trafton
- Elizur Wright

== See also ==
- Slavery in Massachusetts
- Origins of the American Civil War
- History of African Americans in Boston
- Abolition Riot of 1836
