= Ellis Gray Loring =

American abolitionist lawyer (1803–1858)

- Loring circa 1848
- Born: April 14, 1803; Boston, U.S.
- Died: May 25, 1858 (aged 55); Boston, U.S.
- Education: Harvard College; Harvard Law School
- Spouse: Louisa Gilman
- Children: Anna Loring Dresel

Ellis Gray Loring (April 14, 1803 – May 24, 1858) was an American attorney, abolitionist, and philanthropist from Boston. He co-founded the New England Anti-Slavery Society, provided legal advice to abolitionists, harbored fugitive slaves in his home, and helped finance the abolitionist newspaper, the Liberator. Loring also mentored Robert Morris, who went on to become one of the first African-American attorneys in the United States.

== Early life and career ==
Loring was born in Boston on April 14, 1803, to James Tyng Loring, a druggist, and Relief Faxon Cookson Loring. He attended the Boston Latin School, and was awarded the school's Franklin Medal for scholarship in 1819. He studied at Harvard, where he was a Phi Beta Kappa member. He was admitted to the Massachusetts bar in 1827, and went to work for the Western Railroad Company.

== Abolitionism ==
Loring initially believed that a policy of abolishing slavery gradually, rather than all at once, would attract more supporters to the abolitionist cause. William Lloyd Garrison persuaded him that "immediate and unconditional emancipation" was the only morally acceptable policy. On January 1, 1831, Loring was one of twelve abolitionists who gathered in the basement of the African Meeting House to found the New England Anti-Slavery Society. He and Oliver Johnson drafted the society's constitution. He was also a member of the financial committee that supported the abolitionist newspaper, the Liberator.

Along with David Lee Child and Samuel Edmund Sewall, Loring frequently provided legal advice to abolitionists. In 1836, to appease conservatives who were upset by local activists, Massachusetts governor Edward Everett proposed legislation that would have curtailed the free speech of abolitionists. Along with Garrison and Samuel Joseph May, Loring argued before the joint legislative committee appointed to consider the measure, and persuaded them it was unconstitutional. That same year, he and Sewall successfully argued before the Massachusetts Supreme Court in Commonwealth v. Aves that any slave who was brought to a free state by a slaveholder could not be forced to leave.

In the late 1830s, Loring hired a 15-year-old African-American youth named Robert Morris as a household servant. When Loring's regular copyist, a white youth, neglected his duties, Morris took over for him. Impressed with Morris's intellect, Loring tutored him in the law, and in 1847 presented him for admission to the Massachusetts bar. Morris was the second African American to practice law in Massachusetts, and frequently used his legal expertise in the cause of racial justice.

Loring was on the Amistad Committee, which organized legal and financial support for the captive Africans in United States v. The Amistad in 1841. He and Lewis Tappan visited the 72-year-old John Quincy Adams at his home and persuaded him to take the case.

After the Fugitive Slave Act of 1850 was passed, Loring joined the Boston Vigilance Committee and opened his home to fugitive slaves. Loring's home was one of the safehouses where Ellen Craft stayed when she was being pursued by Georgia slave catchers that October.

In 1851 he was one of the lawyers who defended Shadrach Minkins, a Boston resident who was arrested under the Fugitive Slave Act. When the legal team failed to get Minkins released, a group of activists stormed the courthouse and rescued him. With Richard Henry Dana Jr., Loring defended Robert Morris, Lewis Hayden, and John J. Smith in connection with the rescue.

== Personal life ==
A fifth great grandson of Thomas Loring the immigrant, Loring married Louisa Gilman in 1827. The couple had one child, Anna, who married the pianist and composer Otto Dresel in 1863. Anna's son, Ellis Loring Dresel, was a lawyer and diplomat who served as attaché to the U.S. embassy in Berlin. Louisa Loring was a member of the Boston Female Anti-Slavery Society.

A close friend of Ralph Waldo Emerson, Loring influenced Emerson's views on abolitionism and helped with the research for his 1844 address, Emancipation in the West Indies.

Loring died on May 24, 1858, after a brief illness. Three days later, William Lloyd Garrison and Wendell Phillips eulogized Loring at the New England Anti-Slavery Convention; their remarks were published in the Liberator. The poet John Greenleaf Whittier wrote a tribute to Loring, addressed to their mutual friend Lydia Maria Child.
