= Thomas Tracy Bouvé =

American merchant and naturalist (1815–1896)

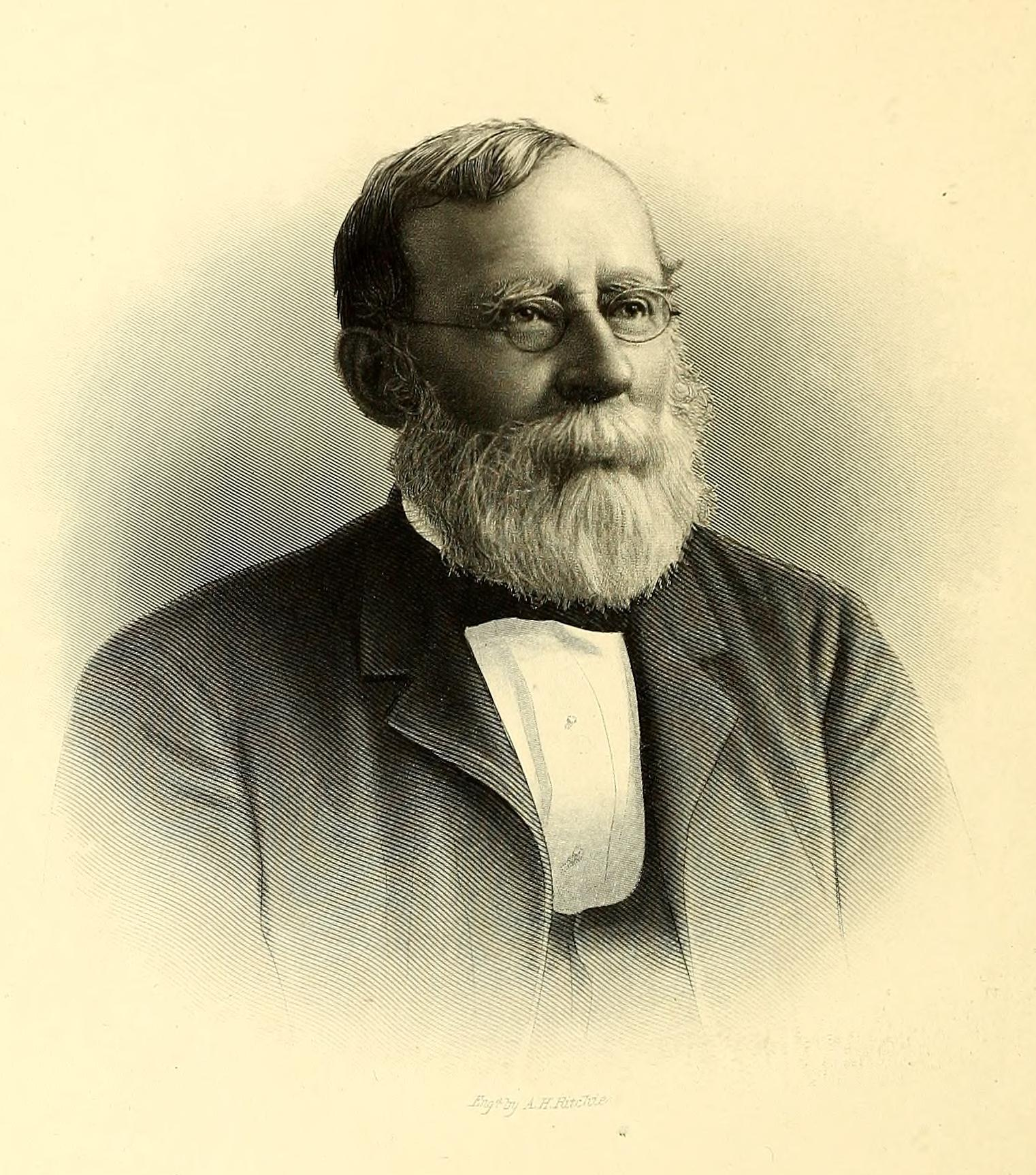
- Bouvé ca. 1884
- Born: January 14, 1815; Boston, Massachusetts, US
- Died: June 3, 1896 (aged 81); Boston, Massachusetts
- Occupation(s): Merchant, naturalist, abolitionist
- Organization: Boston Society of Natural History

Thomas Tracy Bouvé (January 14, 1815 – June 3, 1896) was an American naturalist, abolitionist, and merchant based in Boston. He served as curator and president of the Boston Society of Natural History from 1870 to 1880 and was a member of the American Academy of Arts and Sciences and the Boston Vigilance Committee.

== Life and career ==
Bouvé was born in Boston on January 14, 1815, to Ephraim Osborn and Lydia (Tracy) Bouvé, of Huguenot descent. He attended Boston public schools before dropping out of the English High School to work in a dry goods store at the age of 12. Three years later, he became employed by an iron manufacturing company, where he rose to bookkeeper and chief accountant. At the age of 26, he co-founded Curtis, Bouve and Co., a Boston-based commission iron house, and gained wealth by buying and selling iron for the next 30 years. He was treasurer of the Glendon Iron Company from 1870 until his death. He was active in the community, serving as president of the Home for Destitute Catholic Children and as a trustee of the Perkins Institute for the Blind, Derby Academy, and the public library in the town of Hingham. Bouvé died in Boston on June 3, 1896.

A self-taught amateur naturalist, Bouvé received an honorary Master of Arts degree from Harvard University in 1850. He became involved in the Boston Society of Natural History from the age of 19, building its collections of rocks, minerals, and fossils and serving in a range of roles from curator to treasurer to vice president before ultimately serving as president from 1870 to 1880. He published a history of the society in 1880, in addition to numerous scientific papers in the society's proceedings. He was elected to the American Academy of Arts and Sciences in 1850. He was a member of the American Association for the Advancement of Science and a corresponding member of the Academy of Natural Sciences of Philadelphia.

Bouvé was an abolitionist and supporter of the Free Soil and later the Republican Party. He served on the 1846 and 1850 iterations of the Boston Vigilance Committee, organized to protect freedom seekers from reenslavement. In the 1850s, he raised funds for Free Soil settlers in Kansas. He supported the Union war effort, and his eldest son, Edward Tracy Bouvé, served in the Union army.

Bouvé married Emily G. Lincoln of Hingham in 1839. They had seven children, of whom five survived to adulthood.
