= Joshua Bowen Smith =

American abolitionist and politician (1813–1879)

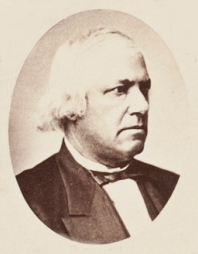
- Joshua Bowen Smith in 1874
- Born: 1813; Coatesville, Pennsylvania
- Died: July 5, 1879 (aged 65–66); Boston
- Resting place: Mount Auburn Cemetery
- Occupation: caterer
- Known for: abolitionism, Underground Railroad, and New England Freedom Association
- Spouse: Emeline

Joshua Bowen Smith (1813–1879) was an abolitionist, conductor on the Underground Railroad, co-founder of the New England Freedom Association, and politician, serving one term as a Massachusetts state legislator. (Note: Several sources refer to Smith as a state senator. A photo album in the State Library of Massachusetts lists him as a state representative.) He worked as a caterer in Boston, starting his own business at the age of 36.

== Biography ==
Joshua Bowen Smith was born in 1813 in Coatesville, Pennsylvania, to a mother of mixed African-American/Native American ancestry and a British father. He grew up in Philadelphia, where he was educated on a scholarship from a Quaker philanthropist.

As a young man, in 1836 Smith moved to Boston, Massachusetts, where he became the headwaiter at the dining room of the Mount Washington House hotel. There he befriended United States Senator Charles Sumner and John J. Fatal, both influential abolitionists. For several years he worked for the catering business of H. R. Thacker before starting his own business at the age of 36.

Over the next 25 years, Smith made a small fortune catering commencement dinners for Harvard College, as well as various events for the city, local organizations, and the Union army during the Civil War years. Through his work he befriended many other local abolitionists, including William Lloyd Garrison, George Luther Stearns, Robert Gould Shaw, and Theodore Parker.

=== Abolitionism ===
Smith became involved in the Underground Railroad and was a member of the Boston Vigilance Committee, which worked to aid refugee slaves. He harbored refugee slaves in his home in Cambridge, employed them in his business as cooks and waiters, and often gave them money out of his own pocket, as well as weapons and supplies if they were traveling on to Canada to ensure their freedom.

He was a co-founder of the New England Freedom Association, a fugitive slave assistance group founded by African Americans. Smith, a Baptist, believed that the Fugitive Slave Act of 1850 was an "un-Christian" law, and that violence in defense against slavery was morally justified. He once displayed a dagger and a revolver from the pulpit during a speech.

=== Later years ===
Smith's catering business suffered a fatal blow in 1861 when Massachusetts Governor John Albion Andrew refused to reimburse him for services provided to the 12th Massachusetts Regiment over a 93-day period. Andrew claimed he could not pay the bill because the legislature had not approved the funds, yet he paid all the other caterers who were also owed money. Smith sued the state in 1879 and received some compensation, but not enough even to recoup his legal expenses. He spent the rest of his life in debt.

In 1865, Smith was instrumental in persuading state officials to commission a memorial to Robert Gould Shaw, who commanded the African-American 54th Massachusetts Infantry Regiment, which had distinguished itself during the war. He worked with Governor Andrews, Senator Charles Sumner, and other supporters of the proposal.

The state ultimately commissioned Augustus Saint-Gaudens for the work, and he created a bronze relief sculpture depicting Colonel Shaw and members of the 54th Massachusetts Regiment as they marched through Boston to depart for the war. It was unveiled and dedicated on May 31, 1897.

In October 1867 Smith became the first African-American member of the Saint Andrew's Lodge of Freemasons of Massachusetts, and served as junior warden of the Adelphi Lodge in South Boston. From 1873 to 1874, he represented Cambridge for one term in the Massachusetts state legislature, where he served as chairman of the Committee on Foreign Relations. He advised Senator Charles Sumner on his draft of the Civil Rights Act of 1875, and helped persuade the state legislature to rescind its censure of Sumner.

At the senator's death, Sumner bequeathed to Smith a painting titled The Miracle of the Slave. He had purchased it in a Montpellier art gallery, and it was likely a copy of the eponymous painting by Italian Tintoretto.

Smith died in Boston on July 5, 1879, after a prolonged illness. He was buried at Mount Auburn Cemetery in Cambridge.

== Legacy and honors ==
Smith's former home at 79 Norfolk Street in Cambridge is marked with a plaque installed in 1994 by the Cambridge African American History Project. Smith bought the house in 1852 and lived there with his wife, Emeline, until his death.

== See also ==
- 1873 Massachusetts legislature
- 1874 Massachusetts legislature
