= Timothy Gilbert =

American piano maker and abolitionist (1797–1865)

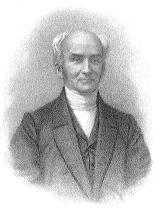
Timothy Gilbert

Timothy Gilbert (January 5, 1797 – July 19, 1865) was an American piano manufacturer, abolitionist and religious organizer in Boston, Massachusetts. His brother Lemuel Gilbert (February 10, 1804 – February 27, 1864) was also a piano manufacturer.

== Life ==
Gilbert was born in Enfield, Massachusetts, the second child of Timothy Gilbert and Fear Shaw and worked on his father's farm until the age of 21. He arrived in Boston December 1818, where he apprenticed with cabinet maker Levi Ruggles, and later worked for piano maker John Osborn before becoming a piano maker in his own right. He was an active member of the Baptist Church, to which he converted in 1817, and was an outspoken abolitionist. He maintained his home as a station of the Underground Railroad, and on the passage of the Fugitive slave laws Gilbert announced in the papers that his door would remain open to runaway slaves. He was also member and director in secular charitable organizations and served as president of the Boylston Bank from 1855 to 1860. He was president of the Boston Vigilance Committee, an organization that aided fugitive slaves.

Gilbert married Mary Wetherbee in 1823 (Ashburnham, Mass., July 7, 1796–December 1843), and their only child, Mary Eunice, was born June 8, 1827. Following Mary's death, Gilbert married Alice Davis November 28, 1844, and in 1846 they adopted Alice (b. April 23, 1846). Their second daughter, Martha Fear Gilbert, was born April 27, 1847.

Gilbert died July 19, 1865, at his home in Boston. His funeral was held at the Tremont Temple at the expense of the Evangelical Baptist Benevolent and Missionary Society, both of which he had been instrumental in forming. He is buried at Mount Auburn cemetery.

== Pianos ==
=== Currier & Gilbert ===
Gilbert entered a partnership with Boston piano maker Ebenezer Currier (1801–1835) by 1826, and they were listed at 393 Washington street by 1829, but the partnership was dissolved that spring. Currier, with new partner Philip Brown, opened a showroom on the first floor, where they offered "all kinds of Upright & Horizontal Piano Fortes...embracing the latest improvements," and in 1831 he patented a square piano with hammers above the strings.

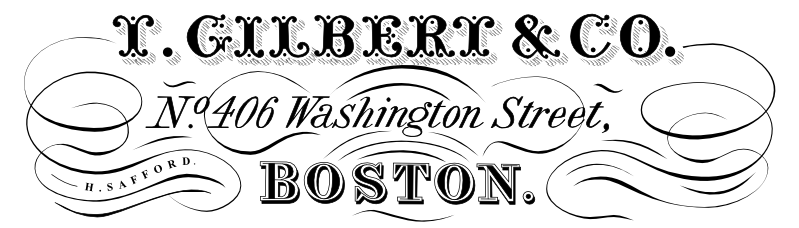
nameboard label ca.1840

Washington street, ca.1852

=== T. Gilbert, T. Gilbert & Co. ===
==== 402 and 406 Washington street; 393 and 400 Washington street ====
Gilbert established his own factory in his previous employer John Osborn's former workshops at 402 Washington street, near Beach street. By 1834 the firm reorganized as T. Gilbert & Company, with Gilbert's brother Lemuel Gilbert and brother in law Henry Safford (1802-c.1872) as partners. In 1835 their address was listed as 400 Washington street, and this year alone included Currier & Gilbert's old address at 393 Washington—the entry for Currier was his last and did not give a business address—and in 1836 brother in law Increase Gilbert was admitted as partner. In 1837 T. Gilbert & Co. were awarded a silver medal for one of the pianos they showed at the Exhibition of the Massachusetts Charitable Mechanic Association, placed after fellow Boston manufacturers Chickering & Co., Wilkins & Newhall, and Hallet & Allen for the tone and slightly heavy touch of their piano, but the company was removed from competition at the following exhibition for advertising "the fact, that they have not, to their knowledge, a personal friend among the selected judges." They received a silver medal for a horizontal piano at the 1839 Franklin Institute exhibition in Philadelphia, and a diploma for the third best square piano at the 1841 exhibition in Boston.

In 1841 Gilbert patented improvements in uprights in which he claimed a spring attached to the hammer butt for the combined purposes of returning the hammer to its resting position, reseating the damper against the strings, and keeping the hammer in communication with the key, and he also included a screw adjustment for jack position and damper timing, and a secondary notch on the hammer butt to facilitate shakes and trills. Piano historian Daniel Spillane described that this patent was for "a number of ideas and inventions relating to uprights and squares… and a number of lesser improvements which came to nothing", but considered the upright action significant because it "outlined many ideas afterward claimed by Wornum… in England", referring to an 1842 patent by this manufacturer that Edgar Brinsmead dubbed the "tape-check action" in the 1879 edition of his History of the Pianoforte, in which the last claim was for methods coupling the damper and hammer.

The same year Gilbert was assigned tuner Edwin Fobes' patent for manufacturing hammers with a layer of soft leather covering a block of cork glued to the top portion of the hammer molding. Gilbert also licensed the Aeolian attachment patented by independent mechanic Obed. Coleman in 1844, which fitted a simple reed organ onto the bottom plank of an ordinary square piano, arranged to be played directly by the keys of the piano. Spillane described that Gilbert & Co. licensed the invention in 1846 "for a small figure"—an article about the inventor from January 1845 reported that the firm paid $25,000 for the exclusive rights to manufacture and sell pianos with it in Massachusetts, while New York manufacturers Nunns & Clark paid $25,000 in cash and offered $50,000 royalties for its use in the rest of the country. Spillane wrote that although the Aeolian attachment received some notice as a novelty in the Boston and New York papers, "little came of this…it having been proved that the piano section, at least, required to be tuned every month to keep it in tolerably good condition" a charge the firm reported had been raised by "many of the piano forte makers and others in their interest" and which they attempted to meet when they advertised in 1850 they would thereafter install the attachment only in pianos built expressly for it.

William H. Jameson (1818—1887) joined the company as a partner about 1843. Jameson married Gilbert's daughter Mary Eunice in 1845.

T. Gilbert, fig. 1, U.S. patent No. 1,970

O. M. Coleman, fig. 1, U.S. patent 3,548: the Aeolian Attachment

==== Patent Aeolian Pianoforte Manufactory ====
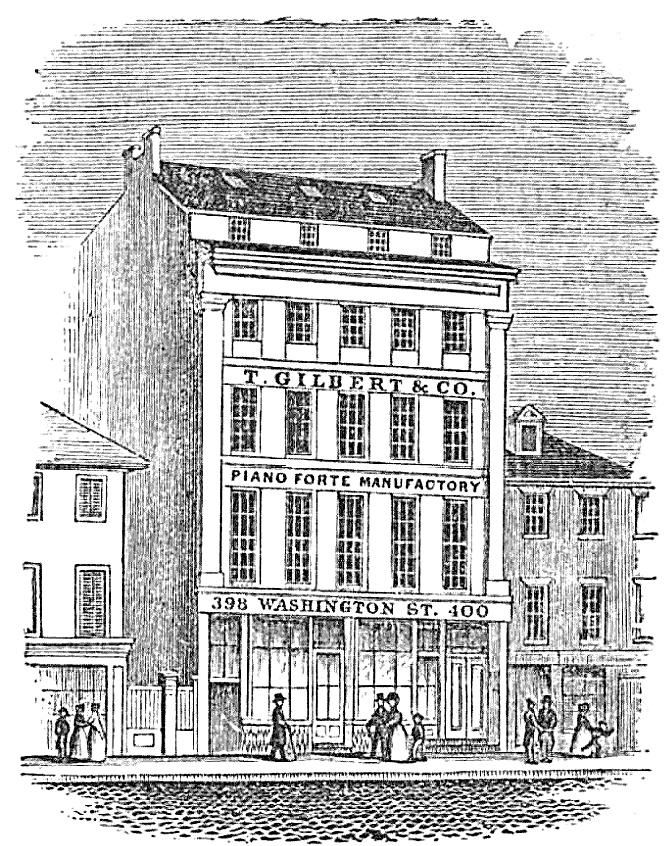
Patent Aeolian Piano Forte Manufactory, ca.1850

In 1847 Gilbert & Co. erected new granite-front warerooms at 400 Washington street, opposite Boylston Market. According to their entry in The Stranger's Guide in the City of Boston published in 1848 the new facilities cost about $20,000 (~$584,988 in 2024) and together with two buildings in the rear occupied over 8,000 square feet (740 m^{2}), the whole being powered and heated by steam, and in a brief and not entirely reliable retrospective of the Boston piano industry published by the Boston Globe in 1915, Arthur Brayley described that the warerooms were connected by bridges with the factory across the yard, and an underground passage connected the machine shop with the boiler room, "which was said to be a refuge for runaway slaves". The sketch of the firm for Edwin Freedley's Leading Pursuits and Leading Men of 1856 described that they manufactured every part of their pianos except the cases on their own premises, and although their operations were conducted in from twenty-five to thirty rooms they went on "with the most perfect order and system." The 1848 article also stated the firm employed about sixty workers, and had manufactured between 3,000 and 4,000 pianos, upwards 500 of them with the Aeolian attachment.

In 1847 Gilbert patented a cast iron frame for grand pianos with the ordinary resisting bars combined with bars perpendicular to the strings—one of which was to be connected with the front edge of the sounding board—in order to prevent the case sides from twisting, as well as a double action for horizontal pianos with springs meant to support the weight of the hammers and dampers in order to lighten the touch of the keys.

In 1850 Gilbert listed $80,000 capital, with eighty workers and sales worth $112,500, ranking him the second largest piano manufacturer in Boston after Jonas Chickering. The Rich Men of Massachusetts, published in 1851, stated Gilbert had made more than 4,400 pianos to date, upwards 1,100 with the Aeolian attachment, and estimated his fortune as $100,000. T. Gilbert & Co. were awarded a diploma for a piano with the aeolian attachment exhibited by piano dealers Waters & Berry at the 1850 American Institute fair, placed third after D. Benson & Co., of Buffalo, and J. H. Grovesteen of New York.

In 1851 Gilbert patented actions for horizontal and vertical pianos where escapement was operated by a lower extension of the hammer butt instead of by a fixed button in order to reduce the number of parts to allow a lighter touch, and with an additional projection to limit the motion of the jack to improve repetition. They granted their New York and general agencies to Horace Waters the same year, and Waters advertised their iron frame squares with the circular scale as well as upright grands and boudoir pianos. Gilbert & Co. received honorable mention for a square piano with the Aeolian attachment at the 1851 London Exhibition, a silver medal for the second best piano at the 1851 American Institute fair, a diploma for an aelioan attachment at the 1852 American Institute fair and a bronze medal for the third best square at the 1853 Exhibition of the Massachusetts Charitable Mechanic Association.

==== 484 Washington street ====
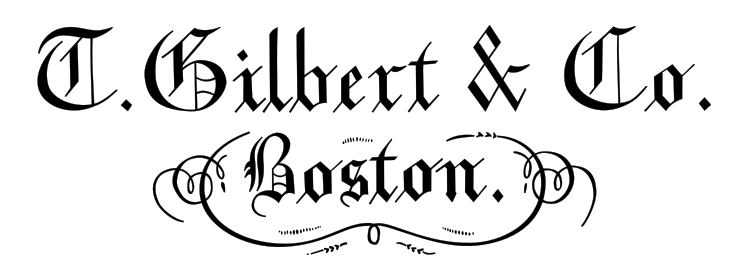
nameboard label ca.1855

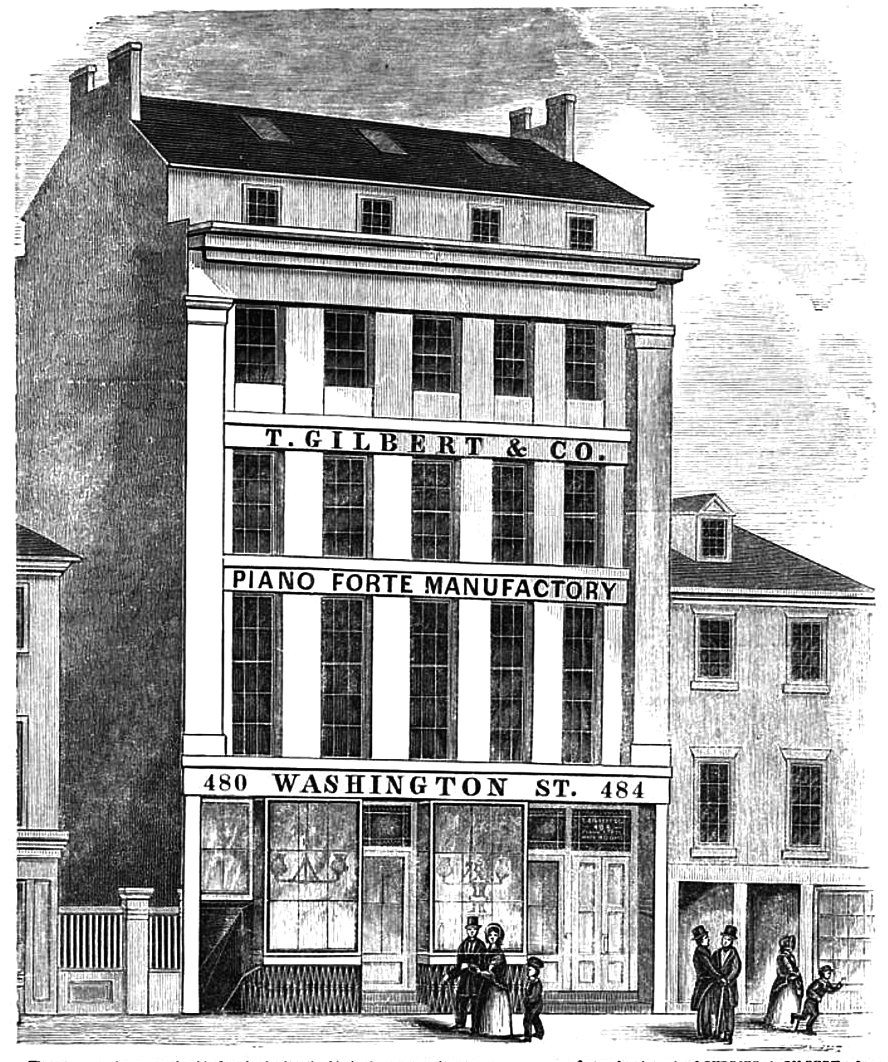
Patent Aeolian Piano Forte Manufactory, ca.1856

In 1853 Gilbert & Company's street address changed from 400 to 484 when Washington Street was renumbered.

In 1856 they advertised they had made upwards of 6,000 pianos, as many as 2,300 with the Aeolian attachment. They were awarded a bronze medal for the third best grand action piano at the American Institute Fair, after Chickering & Sons and Steinway & Sons, and a silver medal for a grand piano and a bronze medal for a square at the Exhibition of the Massachusetts Charitable Mechanic Association. In 1857 they advertised they had adopted all new scales, as well as a "new improved action", and by 1859 advertised having made nearly 8,000 pianos, including squares, full grand and Orpheons, directing attention to their obliquely strung parlor grands "as superior to all others now manufactured". They were awarded a silver medal for grands and parlor grands, after Chickering & Sons, and a bronze medal for a piano with an aeolian attachment at the 1860 Exhibition of Massachusetts Charitable Mechanic Association, where their grand piano was judged to be "an instrument of great excellence, and equalled by few."

Gilbert & Company's relative importance appears to have decreased by the early 1860s, and one late account estimates their output as six pianos a week at that time, the fourth largest Boston piano manufacturer after Chickering & Sons (20 pianos a week), Hallet, Davis & Co. (10) and Hallet & Cumston (8). By 1864 they were listed at 20 Beach street only, with 484 Washington street listed for piano manufacturer William Bourne, formerly of 460 and 611 Washington.

== Religion ==
=== The Free Baptist Church ===
Gilbert was originally a member of the Charles Street Baptist church, but left it for the Federal Street Baptist Church which was more aligned with his views on slavery—Fulton wrote it had been said Gilbert first tested his new congregation by "fill[ing] his pew with colored people [and that] no one objected", and more recent accounts state he was expelled from the Charles street church for this reason—and left the Federal Street church April 1839 to join the Free Baptist church whose first services were held April 21, 1839 at Baldwin Place, with 82 attending. A sermon was given by the congregation's future first pastor Nathaniel Colver, with whom Gilbert had corresponded since Colver's lecturing tour the previous year.

The non-segregated, anti-slavery, temperance, and anti-secret society Free Church first met in a room on Tremont Row, then at Congress Hall, and at the Museum Building at the corner of Bromfield and Tremont Streets, and by 1841 had 325 members

==== The Tremont Temple ====
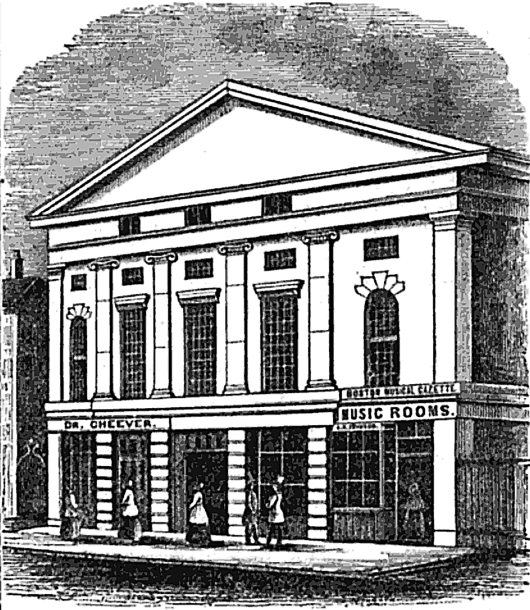
ca. 1851

In 1843, Gilbert, S. W. Shipley, Thomas Gould and William S. Damrell raised $55,000 to purchase the failed Tremont Theater on School Street in order to establish a permanent and self-supporting home for the church. The building was remodeled at the additional cost of more than $24,000, during which time Gilbert left the management of his business with his partner Jameson. The Tremont Temple was dedicated December 1843, and the free-seat church was supported by renting out its storefronts and offices, as well as the 88 feet (27 m) by 90 feet (27 m), 2,000 seat hall. The deed for the building and land was transferred by the four owners to a trust in 1844.

The Tremont Temple burned on March 31, 1852, destroying it and a neighboring building. Early estimates put losses at about $200,000, including the building, which was insured for $42,000, A. J. Shepard's piano and music store valued at $8,000, and Thomas Thompson's collection of paintings valued $45,000.

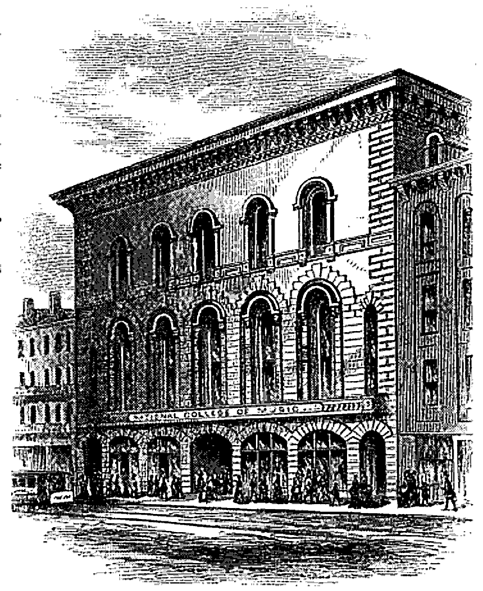
ca. 1872

A new building designed by William Washburn was started on the site in May; the first service was held in the vestry a year later, and the new Tremont Temple was completed December, 1853, with a 124 feet (38 m) by 72 feet (22 m) main hall capable of seating 2,500, and smaller 1000 seat and 300 seat halls. Its value was projected to be $100,000 fully furnished but it cost more than $125,000. This was intended to be offset by renting out four stores and a number of offices and studios, and the entire second story was occupied by the Young Men's Christian Association.

By 1855 the four trustees found it impossible to continue holding the property, and at a meeting of prominent local Baptists that March it was determined that the property be secured to the denomination. Ownership was transferred temporarily to a group of thirty-seven until the necessary subscriptions for a new society for the purpose were raised, and in June the deed was conveyed to trustees Thomas Richardson, Frederick Gould, J. W. Converse, G. W. Chipman and J. W. Merrill for $37,000 more than the outstanding liabilities. An act of incorporation was secured for the Evangelical Baptist Benevolent and Missionary Society in 1857; it was organized the following May, the deed transferred to it in November, and in June, 1859 the society executed a lease granting the use of the great hall, organ and furniture to the Tremont Street Baptist Church and Society for a free seat church on Sundays.

The second Tremont Temple burned August 14, 1879, with an estimated loss of $200,000. It was insured for $100,000 (~$2.85 million in 2024). It was rebuilt the following year for about $180,000 and was destroyed in a fire March 19, 1893.

=== American Baptist Anti-Slavery Convention ===
Gilbert joined the American Baptist Anti-Slavery Convention, formed at the Tremont Chapel in 1840, which published a series of inflammatory letters denouncing slave-holding as an ungraduated sin which precipitated a rift in the theoretically neutral Triennial Convention. The abolitionists were excluded from the ballots at the 1841 convention, and lost an influential position on the Board of Foreign Missions, and in response the Anti-Slavery Convention formed their own provisional foreign committee in 1842. Gilbert was elected treasurer and was charged with collecting funds that otherwise would be donated to the American Board of Foreign Missions—he explained later "the majority of the abolitionists have not so much objection to receive the money of slaveholders, as to be associated with them in evangelizing the world, and thus, by the copartnership, acknowledge them to be Christians in good standing in the Baptist church."

Gilbert sent funds to missionaries, including Adoniram Judson and Jonathan Wade, providing they affirmed they were abolitionists, and even proposed establishing missions entirely independent of the Board of Foreign Missions, but refrained from joining the American and Foreign Missionary Society (later called the American Baptist Free Mission Society) which attracted many of his colleagues, stating "When I shall become convinced, that there is no good reason to hope that the old missionary organization will purge itself from the charge of receiving money in such a way as to enter into a copartnership with slaveholders, and giving its sanction to that wicked institution, then I shall be prepared to abandon them, not provisionally, but forever." In 1845 the Anti-Slavery Convention as well as the provisional committee were dissolved, after the formation of the Southern Baptist Convention and dissolution of the Triennial Convention, and Gilbert joined the mainstream Missionary Union.
