= Austin Bearse =

American sea captain and abolitionist (1808–1881)

- Born: April 3, 1808; Barnstable, Massachusetts
- Died: December 2, 1881 (aged 73)
- Occupation: sea captain
- Known for: abolitionism

Austin Bearse (1808-1881) was a sea captain from Cape Cod who provided transportation for fugitive slaves in the years leading up to the American Civil War.

== Early life ==
Bearse was born in Barnstable, Massachusetts, on April 3, 1808. As a youth he worked occasionally as a mate on slave-trading vessels off the coast of South Carolina and saw firsthand how cruelly the slaves were treated. Decades later, he recalled in his memoir that "they were separated from their families and connections with as little concern as calves and pigs are selected out of a lot of domestic animals." Often the families and friends of the departing slaves were allowed to spend the night on the ship before it set sail. When morning came, Bearse had the unpleasant duty of warning them that it was time to say goodbye, and, as he put it, "the shrieks and cries of grief at these times were enough to make anyone's heart ache."

Affected by these experiences, Bearse became an abolitionist. He continued working as a seaman, but refused to trade below the Mason–Dixon line.

== Abolitionism ==
In 1847, at the request of Quaker agents Abigail and Lydia Mott, he smuggled a slave named George Lewis from Albany to Boston. There Lewis was reunited with his daughter, who had also run away. Bearse found Lewis a job, and the Reverend Leonard Grimes of the Twelfth Baptist Church raised the funds to ransom Lewis's wife and remaining children from the slaveholders. This was the first of many such rescues in which Bearse took part.

Soon after Congress passed the Fugitive Slave Act of 1850, Bearse became a member of the Boston Vigilance Committee, a fugitive slave rescue organization with connections to the Underground Railroad. Around that time, he moved to City Point in South Boston. In 1851 he worked as a harbor spy for the Committee, keeping an eye out for slave-catchers. He also served as dues collector until 1855. Coordinating with Thomas Wentworth Higginson, Wendell Phillips, Lewis Hayden, William Ingersoll Bowditch and other committee members, Bearse undertook several daring slave rescues in his 36-foot sloop, the Moby Dick. In one case, the committee hired him to retrieve a fugitive slave named Sandy Swain from the brig Florence, which was moored at Fort Independence after sailing from North Carolina. He brought with him several white abolitionists and a party of black dock workers from Long Wharf, and persuaded the captain of the brig to hand Swain over to him. As they were sailing away, they dressed Swain as a fisherman so he would blend in when they landed at City Point House. From there, Swain was driven to a safe house in Brookline, and continued the next morning on his way to Canada.

On another occasion, Bearse was asked to retrieve a fugitive slave from the Sally Ann, also from North Carolina. He was unable to enlist a party of men to go with him on short notice, so he and his brother decided to try it on their own. To intimidate the other captain, Bearse tied jackets and hats to the railing of his own ship to make it appear from a distance as though he had a large crew to back him up. He then sent his brother in the yacht's rowboat to pick up the stowaway. Apparently fooled, the captain of the Sally Ann turned the stowaway over to the Bearse brothers, who brought him to South Boston and put him up in his home. The freed slave then continued on the Underground Railroad to Canada.

In 1853 Bearse was interviewed by Harriet Beecher Stowe at the office of the Liberator as part of her research for A Key to Uncle Tom's Cabin.

== Death and legacy ==
Towards the end of his life, Bearse published a memoir, Reminiscences of the Fugitive Slave-Law Days in Boston (1880). He died on December 2, 1881, and was buried in the Beechwood Cemetery in Centerville, Massachusetts. The Austin Bearse House in Centerville (built c. 1691) is part of the Centerville Historic District.
