= John P. Coburn =

African-American abolitionist (1811–1873)

- Born: 1811; Boston, Massachusetts
- Died: January 20, 1873 (age 62); Boston, Massachusetts
- Known for: Abolitionism
- Spouse: Emeline Coburn
- Children: Wendell Coburn
- Relatives: Mary Coburn (mother) John Coburn (father)

John P. Coburn (1811–1873) was a 19th-century African-American abolitionist, civil rights activist, tailor and clothier from Boston, Massachusetts. For most of his life, he resided at 2 Phillips Street in Boston's Beacon Hill neighborhood. Coburn was one of the wealthiest African Americans in Boston of his time. His property on the North Slope of Beacon Hill had the third highest real property value in an 1850 census. Coburn was heavily involved in abolition-related work within his community, specifically work related to the New England Freedom Association and the Massasoit Guards.

== Entrepreneurial career ==
Coburn worked as a building contractor, tailor, and clothier. He managed two clothing stores, one at 20 Brattle Street and another at 59 Cornhill Street. His business focused on tailoring clothes and selling clothes which were advertised to be the current trend. Coburn sold cashmere clothing, doeskins, tweeds and vestings. He also sold men's garments, and cleaned and repaired clothes. In the mid-1860s, Coburn changed the name of his clothing store to W.T. Coburn Clothing Store, after his son Wendell T. Coburn.

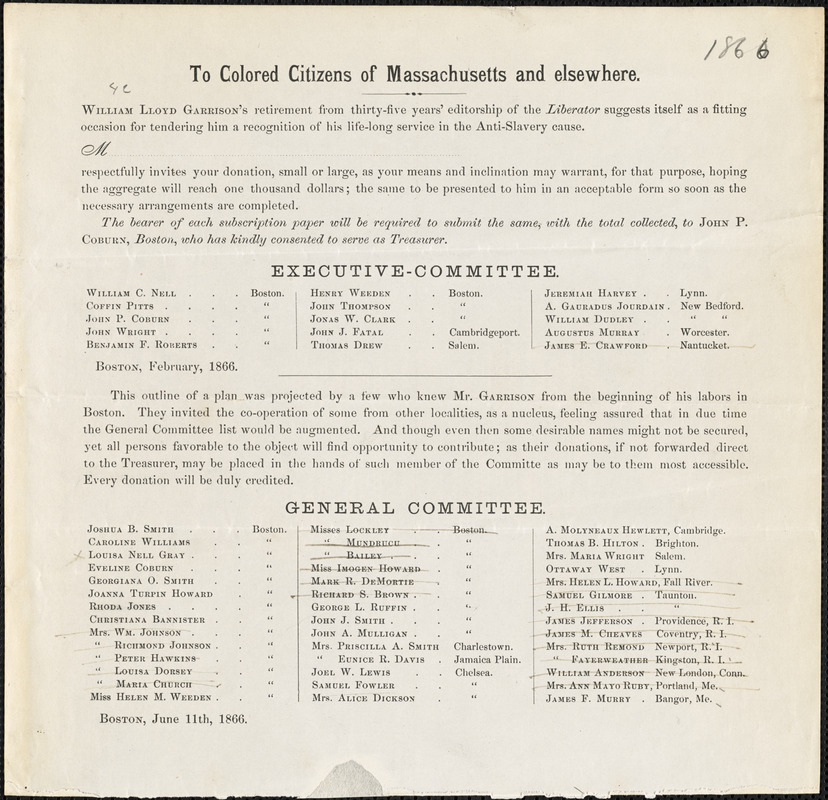
Letter to coloured people of Massachusetts, encouraging them to donate money to assist William Lloyd Garrison, editor of The Liberator, financially so he can retire.

Coburn also co-owned a profitable gaming house, named the Coburn Gaming House, with his brother-in-law Ira Gray. The Coburn Gaming House doubled as a safe house on the Underground Railroad. The main clientele of the gaming house was aristocratic African-Americans. This business brought Coburn even more wealth and allowed him to finance many rescue operations for fugitive slaves like that of Shadrach Minkins.

== Contributions to abolitionism ==
Coburn was the treasurer of the New England Freedom Association, an association that focused on helping fugitive slaves. He patronized The Liberator, a local abolitionist newspaper, by publishing advertisements for his stores and acknowledgments to the people who had donated to the New England Freedom Association. In addition, he would also put out announcements offering lodging to those in need.

In 1854, Coburn founded the Massasoit Guards, a black military company, to police Beacon Hill and protect residents from slave catchers. He served as the company's captain. The Massasoit Guards were never officially recognized by the state, despite repeated petitions by attorney Robert Morris. The group was named after a Wampanoag chief who had been friendly to Massachusetts colonists. Coburn also recruited volunteers for the militant abolitionist John Brown.

== Family and legacy ==
Coburn was married to Emeline Coburn and had one adopted son named Wendell Coburn. Between 1843 and 1844, he commissioned architect Asher Benjamin to design a house for him at the corner of Phillips and Irving Streets. Coburn died in 1873 and left most of his belongings to his son Wendell Coburn. His house, located on Beacon Hill, is now a site on Boston's Black Heritage Trail.
