= John Rock (abolitionist) =

American abolitionist (1825–1866)

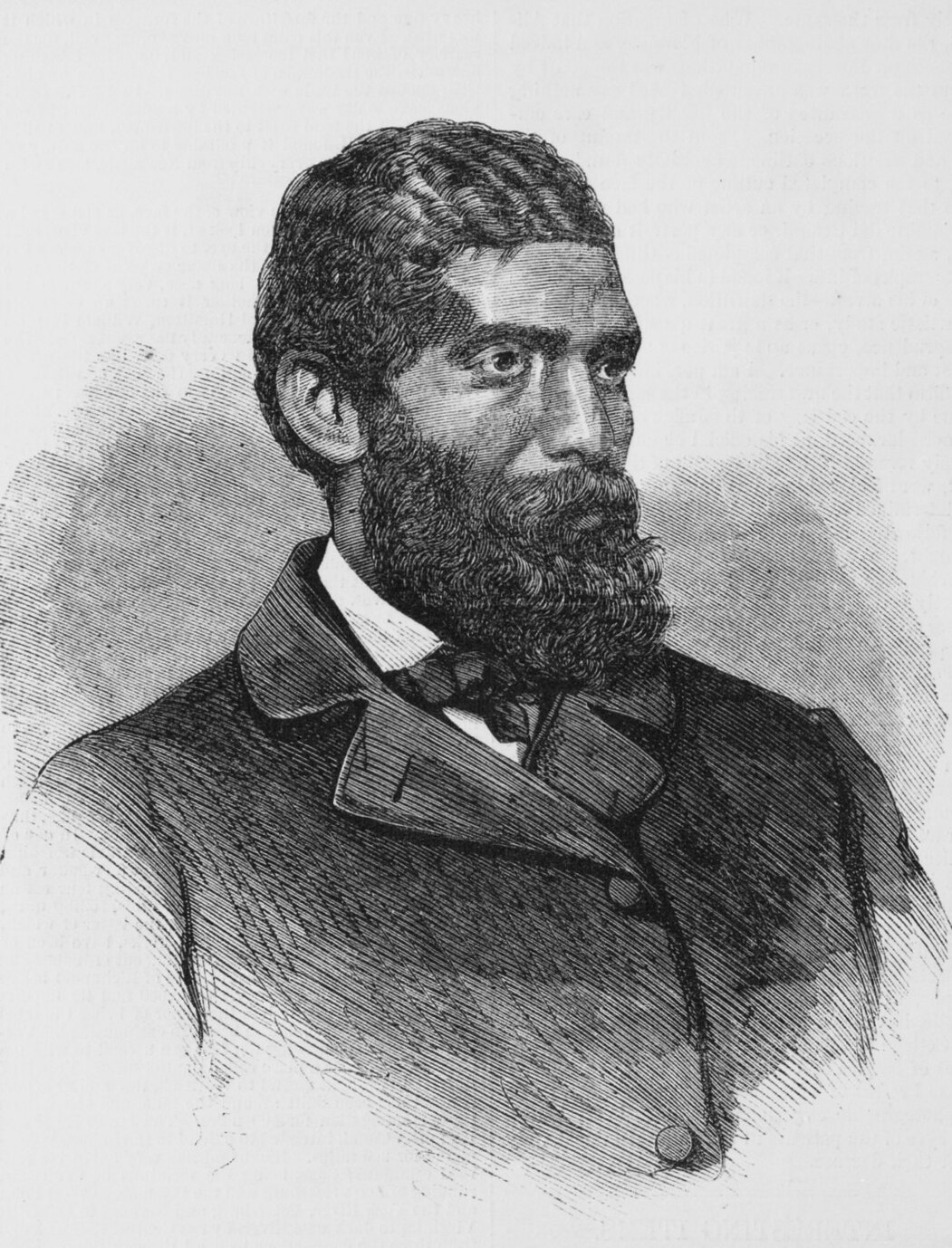
- Rock c. 1865
- Born: John Stewart Rock; October 13, 1825; Salem, New Jersey, US
- Died: December 3, 1866 (aged 41); Boston, Massachusetts, US
- Other names: John Sweatt Rock
- Occupations: teacher, doctor, dentist, lawyer, and abolitionist

John Stewart Rock (October 13, 1825 – December 3, 1866) was an African American teacher, doctor, dentist, lawyer and abolitionist, historically associated with the concept that "black is beautiful", which was thought to have originated from a speech he made in 1858. Historical records now indicate he never actually used the specific phrase on that day, although he did refer to the beauty of Black people.

Rock was one of the first African American men to earn a medical degree. In addition, he was the first black person to be admitted to the bar of the Supreme Court of the United States.

== Early life and education ==
John Stewart Rock was born to John and Maria (Willett) Rock, free African American parents, on October 13, 1825, in Salem, New Jersey. In Rock's formative years, it was relatively uncommon for white children to complete grammar school, and significantly rarer for Black children. Rock's parents, however, encouraged their diligent son in his studies and, despite having little financial resources, provided for him to follow through with formal schooling. By the age of 19, Rock had received the necessary amount of education to take up a position as a teacher.

Rock started out in 1844 in a one-room school in Salem, where he would continue to work for the next four years, garnering the attention and approval of veteran schoolteachers. Rock had an impressive work ethic, consistently holding class for six hours, conducting private tutoring sessions for two hours, and studying medicine under two white physicians, Dr. Shaw and Dr. Gibson, who allowed him to study their textbooks and use their personal book collections for eight hours daily. Medical students at the time commonly undertook apprenticeships with practicing doctors, as Rock did, as a means of gaining medical training. In 1848, Rock applied to medical school, but faced rejection on the basis of his race.

Rock then decided to transfer into the field of dentistry and, after an 1849 apprenticeship with Dr. Harbert, a white dentist, opened a dental practice in Philadelphia in January 1850. Just one year later, he was rewarded with a silver medal for his expert work on a set of silver dentures that he crafted and later displayed. After finally gaining admittance to medical school, Rock graduated from American Medical College in Philadelphia in 1852, becoming one of the first African Americans to attain a degree in medicine. At the age of 27, he had established himself as a talented and well-respected teacher, dentist, and physician.

In 1853, Rock decided to change locations to Boston, which many at the time considered to be the most liberal city in the United States for African Americans. There he set up his own practice in dentistry and medicine. Many of his patients turned out to be sick fugitive slaves making their way through Boston on the Underground Railroad, fleeing towards Canada. He also provided care to members of an integrated abolitionist organization called the Boston Vigilance Committee, which aimed to aid and protect fugitive slaves targeted by the Fugitive Slave Law of 1850. Rock was the second Black to gain acceptance to the Massachusetts Medical Society, sometime after the induction of Dr. John De Grasse in 1854.

== Abolitionist ==
Rock, a passionate abolitionist and civil rights leader, held a strong belief in the dignity and rights of all Americans. Like other abolitionists in the movement, such as George T. Downing and Robert Purvis, Rock became a renowned public speaker and campaigned for equal rights. He was a part of the National Equal Rights League with other famous abolitionists such as Henry Highland Garnet, Frederick Douglass, and John Mercer Langston. Rock's speeches soon began to receive positive public reviews, which led him to travel throughout New England and, occasionally, westward. In 1855, Rock took part in the campaign responsible for the legal desegregation of Boston public schools.

Although he and other abolitionists were determined to see that equality for Black Americans was achieved, there were several significant setbacks in the push for civil rights. The infamous Dred Scott decision was just one example of the rejection of this movement. Dred Scott, a slave, wanted to sue for his freedom, but on March 6, 1857, it was decided that the Missouri Compromise of 1820 was unconstitutional, and that African Americans were not intended to be citizens under the law. This established that Scott would not, in fact, receive his freedom. It was the verdict of this important court case that spurred Rock to continue in his pursuit as an abolitionist and later ignited his determination to start a new career.

Rock is credited with coining the phrase "Black is beautiful" during a speech he gave in Faneuil Hall in March 1858 as a refutation of the Western idea that the physical features of African Americans were unattractive. However, research on Rock's speeches in the Black Abolitionist Digital Archive have shown that he in fact did not say the exact words "Black is beautiful", but did speak of the beauty of Black people, praising "the beautiful, rich color ... of the negro".

Rock's polished speeches were printed in William Lloyd Garrison's The Liberator as well as in general newspapers, promoting these central ideas.

== Lawyer ==
Troubled by health-related problems, Rock applied for a United States passport to travel to Europe for his health, but Secretary of State Lewis Cass refused him one, as the United States Supreme Court had just declared in Dred Scott v. Sandford that a black man could not be a citizen of the United States. In spite of the 1856 law confining the authority to issue passports to the United States Secretary of State, the Secretary of the Commonwealth of Massachusetts issued Rock a passport describing him as a citizen of the commonwealth, and on the strength of this document he traveled to Europe. Rock went to Paris to seek the medical treatment of two leading French surgeons, Auguste Nelaton and Alfred Armand Velpeau. He returned to Boston in February 1859, and in 1860, under his doctors' stipulations to cut back on his workload, he gave up his medical and dental practices and began to study law.

On September 14, 1861, T. K. Lothrop, a white lawyer, made the motion before Judge Russell to have Rock examined. Rock passed and thereby gained admittance to the Massachusetts Bar. He then opened a private law office, through which he advocated even more diligently for the rights of African Americans. In 1862, he spoke at the Anti-Slavery Society in Boston, where he voiced his opposition to Lincoln's plan for the so-called "negro colonization" in Haiti and sided with Frederick Douglass on several issues.

Rock achieved much success as a lawyer, but did not feel that he had truly gained "success", given the lack of freedom that Blacks continued to experience. Rock also stated sadly that an educated negro feels the oppression much more than does an uneducated one. It was thoughts similar to this one, in addition to the lack of executive action for African Americans, that led him to strive to attain the next level of achievement.

On February 1, 1865, the day after Congress approved the Thirteenth Amendment ending slavery, US Senator Charles Sumner of Massachusetts introduced a motion that made Rock the first Black attorney to be admitted to the bar of the Supreme Court of the United States, although he never argued a case before the Court. Rock was, however, the first Black person to be received on the floor of the United States House of Representatives.

== Death ==
On April 9, 1866, the Civil Rights Act of 1866 was passed which enforced the 13th Amendment. Months later, Rock became ill with a common cold that weakened his already failing health, and limited his ability to commute efficiently. On December 3, 1866, Rock died in his mother's home in Boston of tuberculosis at the age of 41. He was buried in Everett's Woodlawn Cemetery, with full Masonic honors. His admittance into the bar of the Supreme Court is recorded on his tombstone. He died before he had an opportunity to argue a case before the Court.
