= John Coburn House =

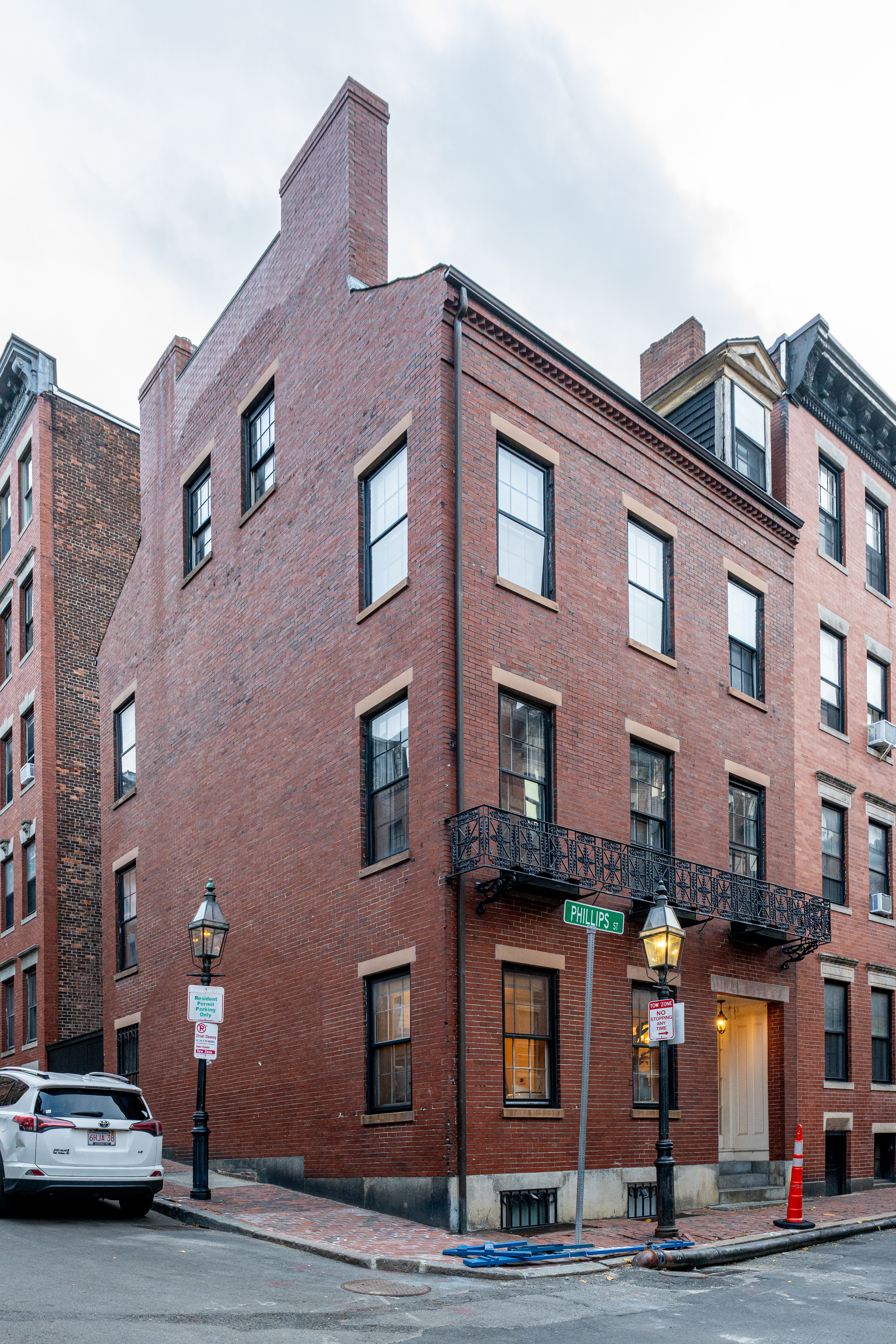

- Location within Boston

General information
- Location: Beacon Hill, Private residence: 2 Phillips Street, Boston, United States
- Coordinates: 42.360337°N 71.066381°W

The John Coburn House was the home of John P. Coburn (1811–1873), an African-American abolitionist who aided people on the Underground Railroad. The home is currently a private residence. It is on the Black Heritage Trail and its history is included in walking tours by the Boston African American National Historic Site.

Between 1843 and 1844, Coburn commissioned architect Asher Benjamin to design a house for him at the corner of Phillips and Irving Streets. Coburn lived there with his wife, Emmeline, and their adopted son Wendell.

== Black Heritage Trail ==
The house is a Boston African-American historical site located on the Black Heritage Trail in Beacon Hill.
