= Shadrach Minkins =

American slave

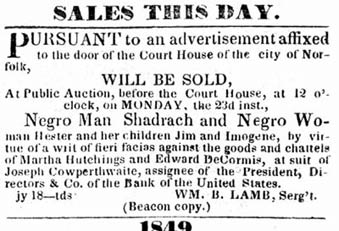
Advertisement for sale of Shadrach Minkins in Virginia, 1849

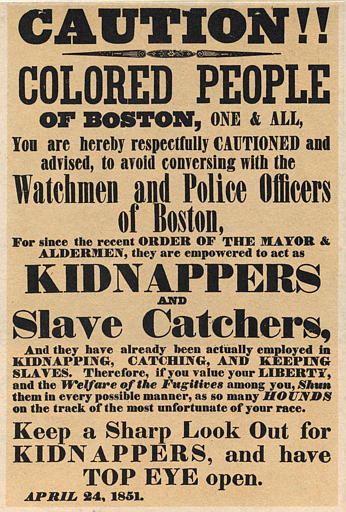
An April 24, 1851 poster warning the "colored people of Boston" about policemen acting as slave catchers, pursuant to the Fugitive Slave Act of 1850

Shadrach Minkins (c. 1814 – December 13, 1875) was an African-American fugitive slave from Virginia who escaped in 1850 and reached Boston. He also used the pseudonyms Frederick Wilkins and Frederick Jenkins. He is known for being freed from a courtroom in Boston after being captured by United States marshals under the Fugitive Slave Act of 1850. Members of the Boston Vigilance Committee freed and hid him, helping him get to Canada via the Underground Railroad. Minkins settled in Montreal, where he raised a family. Two men were prosecuted in Boston for helping free him, but they were acquitted by the jury.

== Early life ==
Minkins was born into slavery about 1817 in Norfolk, Virginia.

== Escape and capture ==
He escaped from slavery at age 33 in May 1850 and reached Boston, Massachusetts, where he became a waiter. Later that year, Congress enacted the Fugitive Slave Act, which allowed federal agents to seize escaped slaves living in free states and return them to their owners. It required law enforcement in all states to cooperate in enforcing this federal law.

United States marshals, who posed as customers at Taft's Cornhill Coffee House where Minkins worked, arrested him on February 15, 1851.

=== Writ of habeas corpus ===
Minkins was taken to a hearing at the Boston federal courthouse. Attorneys, including Samuel E. Sewall, Ellis Gray Loring, Robert Morris and Richard Henry Dana Jr., offered their services to defend Minkins. Seeking to have Minkins released from police custody, they filed a petition for writ of habeas corpus with the Supreme Judicial Court, which was refused by Chief Justice Lemuel Shaw.

Edward G. Walker, Robert Morris, and Lewis Hayden collaborated to obtain Shadrach's release. A group of activists, led by Hayden, entered the courtroom and used force to take Minkins from the marshals. The group has been described variously as "African-American activists"; "a group of outraged black men"; "a group of black Bostonians" and "a band of blacks and whites." One witness later described the men as having "their faces somewhat disguised by having their hair brushed down over the face, and coats buttoned up around their cheeks." With a few exceptions, according to Gary Lee Collison, white members of the Boston Vigilance Committee tended to be more cautious than black members, preferring to supply legal and financial assistance, while black members were more willing to use force.

Minkins was hidden in an attic in Beacon Hill. He escaped Massachusetts with the help of John J. Smith, Lewis Hayden and others. Nine abolitionists were indicted in the affair, but charges were dismissed for some of the individuals. Morris and Hayden were tried and acquitted.

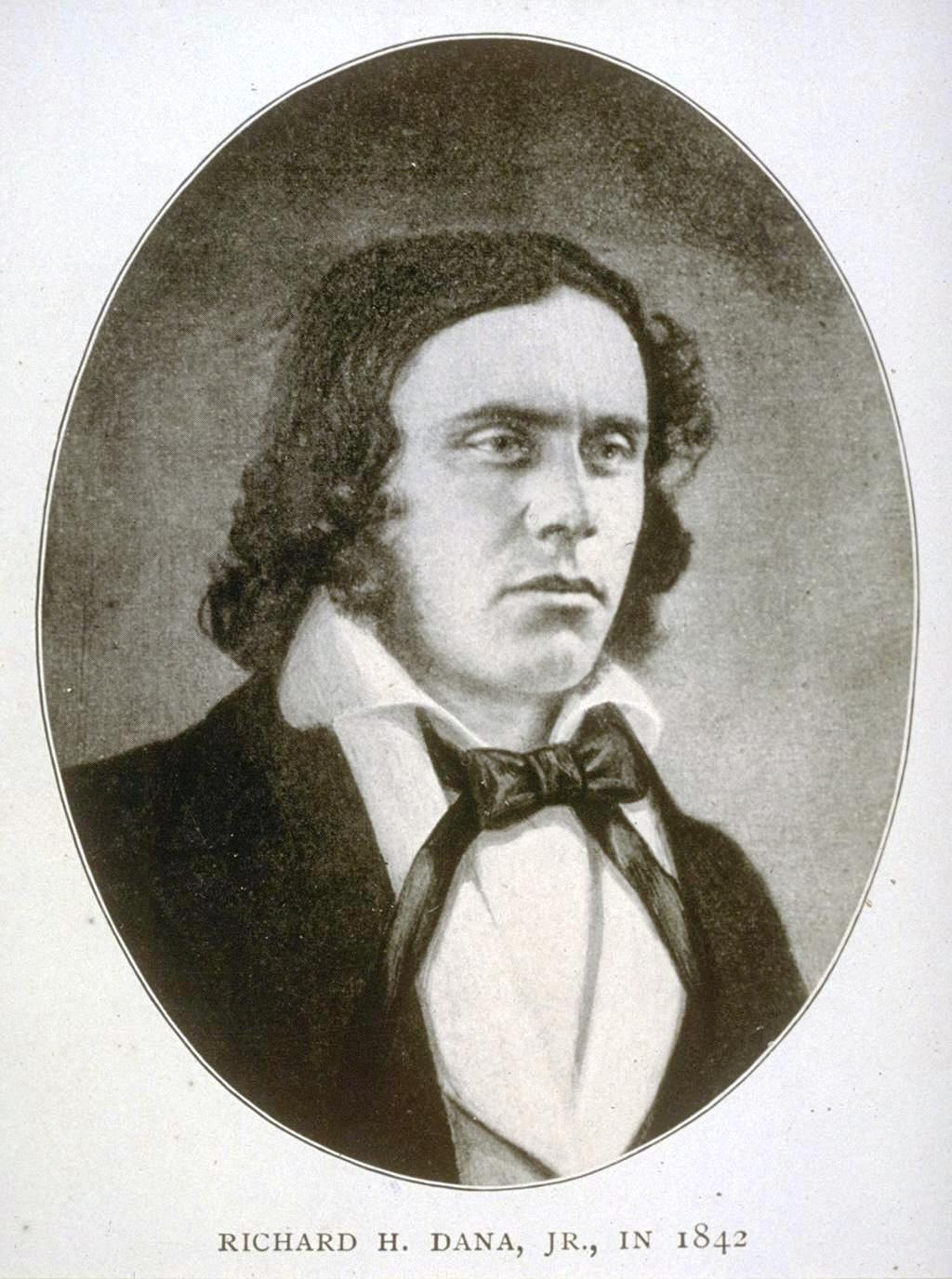
Richard Henry Dana Jr., attorney and author of the novel Two Years Before the Mast, represented many fugitive African Americans fighting against being returned to slavery. He refused any fee for his work; in later years he remarked that defending fugitive slaves represented the "one great act" of his life.

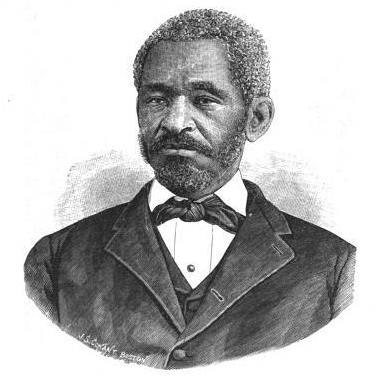
Portrait of Lewis Hayden, 19th century, a member of the Boston Vigilance Committee and a conductor on the Underground Railroad

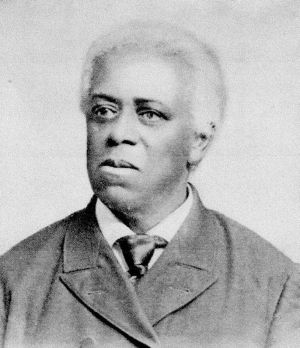
Edward Garrison Walker, an abolitionist who collaborated in freeing Minkins from custody.

=== Resulting trials ===
The rescue of Minkins brought calls for President Millard Fillmore to use federal troops to help marshals enforce the Fugitive Slave Law. Fillmore cautiously called on the citizens of Boston to respect the law and aid in recapturing Minkins. Fillmore ordered Minkins's liberators to be prosecuted. John P. Hale served as defense counsel in the resulting trials. This incident in his home state deeply embarrassed Secretary of State Daniel Webster, who hoped to be elected president in 1852 with Southern support.

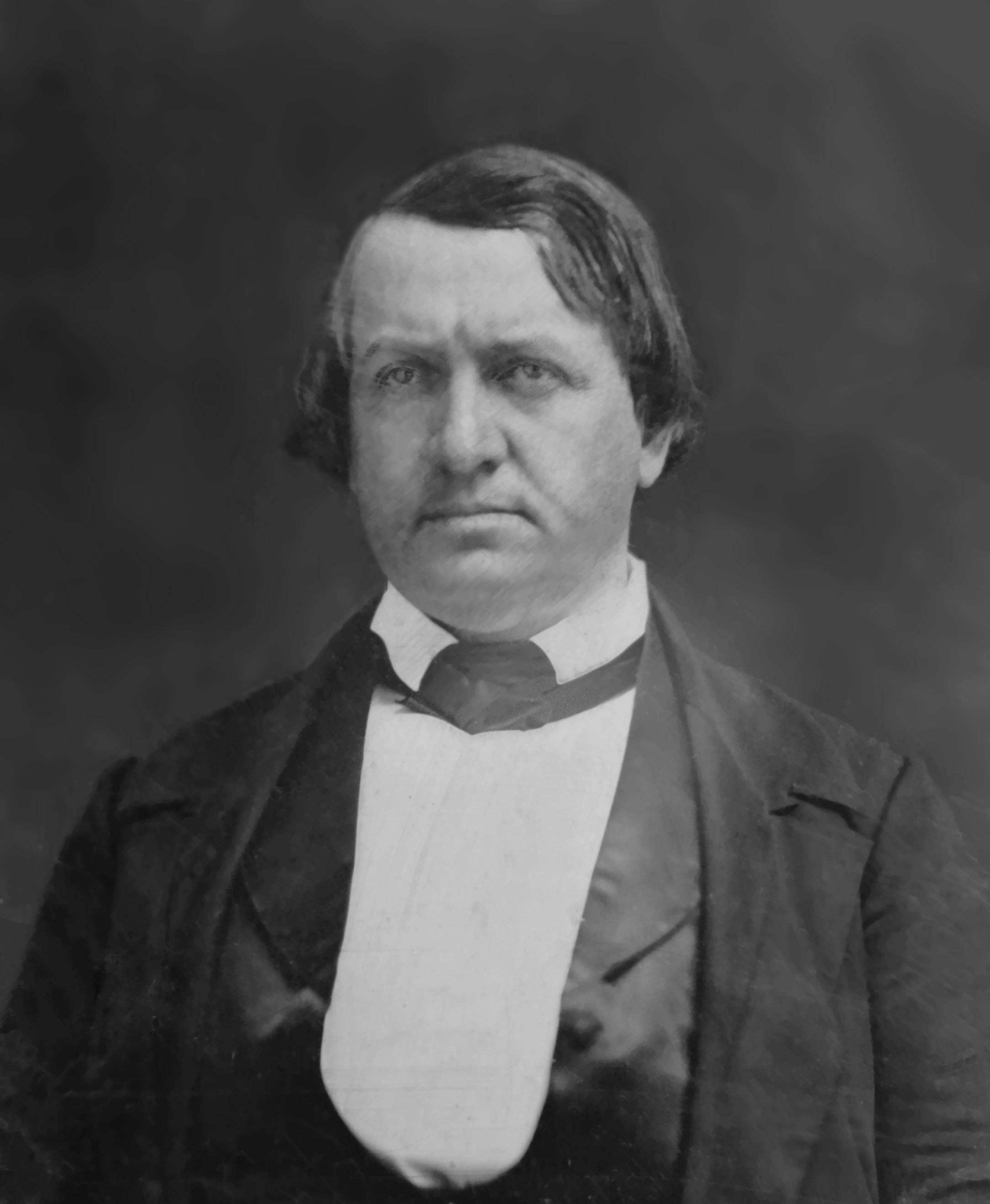
John P. Hale, attorney

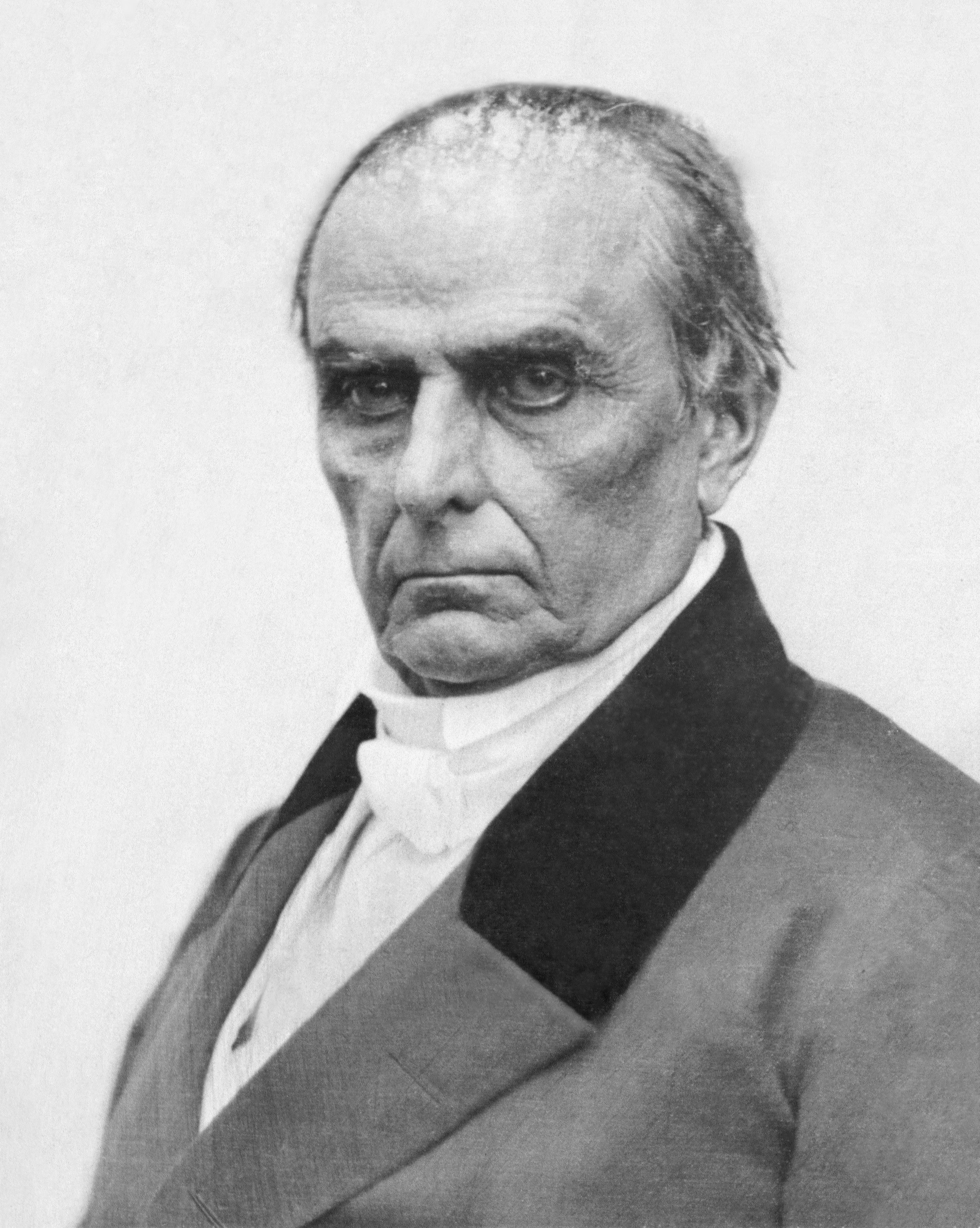
Secretary of State, Daniel Webster

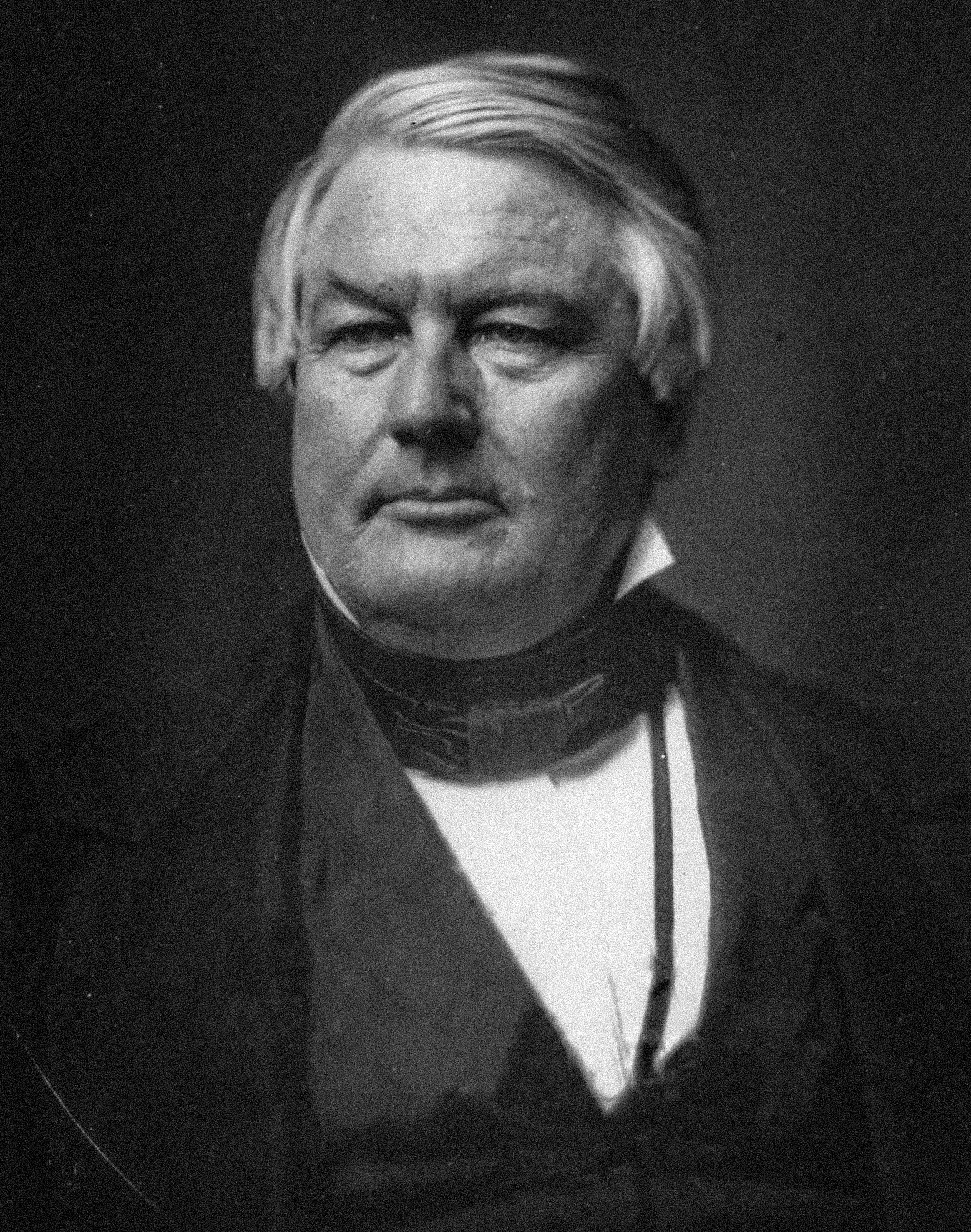
President Millard Fillmore

== Canada ==
From Boston, activists helped Minkins reach Canada via stops on the Underground Railroad. He settled in Montreal, in the section of the city known as Old Montreal. There he made a living first as a waiter, then operating restaurants of his own and, finally, as a barber.

He married in 1853 or 1854.

Minkins died in Montreal in December 1875. He was buried in an unmarked grave near two of his children in Mount Royal Cemetery.

== Legacy ==
Top Eye Open, a 2016 play by Dillon Bustin, dramatizes the story of Shadrach Minkins.

On October 17, 2023, a plaque commemorating him was unveiled by the Friends of Mount Royal Cemetery.

== See also ==
- List of slaves
- New England Freedom Association
- Massasoit Guards

== Bibliography ==
- Collison, Gary Lee (1998). Shadrach Minkins: From Fugitive Slave to Citizen. Cambridge, MA: Harvard University Press. ISBN 0-674-80299-3.
- Gienapp, William E. (1993). "Abolitionism and the Nature of Antebellum Reform". Courage and Conscience: Black & White Abolitionists in Boston. Indiana University Press. pp. 75–100. ISBN 0-253-20793-2.
- Hall, Robert L. (1993). "Massachusetts Abolitionists Document the Slave Experience". Courage and Conscience: Black & White Abolitionists in Boston. Indiana University Press. pp. 21–46. ISBN 0-253-20793-2.
