= New England Freedom Association =

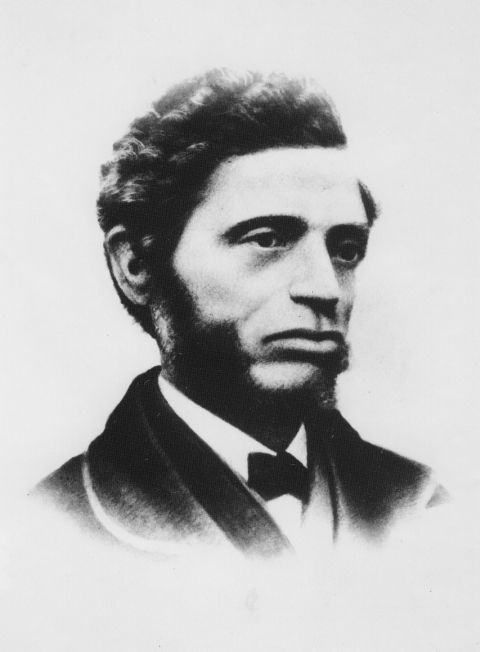
William Cooper Nell

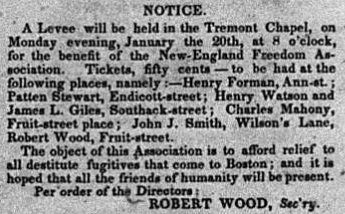
Advertisement in the Liberator, January 17, 1845, for a New England Freedom Association fundraiser

The New England Freedom Association (c.1842 – c.1848) was an organization founded by African Americans in Boston for the purpose of assisting fugitive slaves.

== History ==
The New England Freedom Association was founded in 1842 or 1843, and existed for about five years. Its founding members included William Cooper Nell, Henry Weeden, Judith Smith, Mary L. Armstead, Thomas Cummings, and Robert Wood. They raised "funds to aid those of our friends who flee to the land of the Pilgrims for their liberty." Meetings were held in the African Meeting House on Beacon Hill.

In December 1845, the association announced in the Liberator that it had reorganized. Its officers were:

- President: Henry Weeden
- Vice-President: Joshua V. Smith (possibly a misprint for Joshua B. Smith)
- Corresponding Secretary: John S. Jacobs
- Recording Secretary: Thomas Cummings
- Treasurer: John P. Coburn
- Directors: James Johnson, Peter Avery, John St. Pierre, James L. Giles, James Scott, Mary L. Armstead, Judith Smith

Two of its twelve officers were women. The Boston Vigilance Committee, by contrast, had no female members. In the Liberator article, the association described its purpose:

The object of our Association is to extend a helping hand to all who may bid adieu to whips and chains, and by the welcome light of the North Star, reach a haven where they can be protected from the grasp of the man-stealer. An article of the constitution enjoins upon us not to pay one farthing to any slaveholder for the property they may claim in a human being. ... Our mission is to succor those who claim property in themselves, and thereby acknowledge an independence of slavery.

At least three of its members—John Coburn, James Scott, and John J. Smith—took part in the rescue of Shadrach Minkins in 1850.

The Association eventually merged with the interracial Boston Vigilance Committee.

== See also ==
- Slavery in Massachusetts
- Origins of the American Civil War
- History of African Americans in Boston
- Abolition Riot of 1836
