= John J. Smith =

American politician (1820–1906)

John James Smith
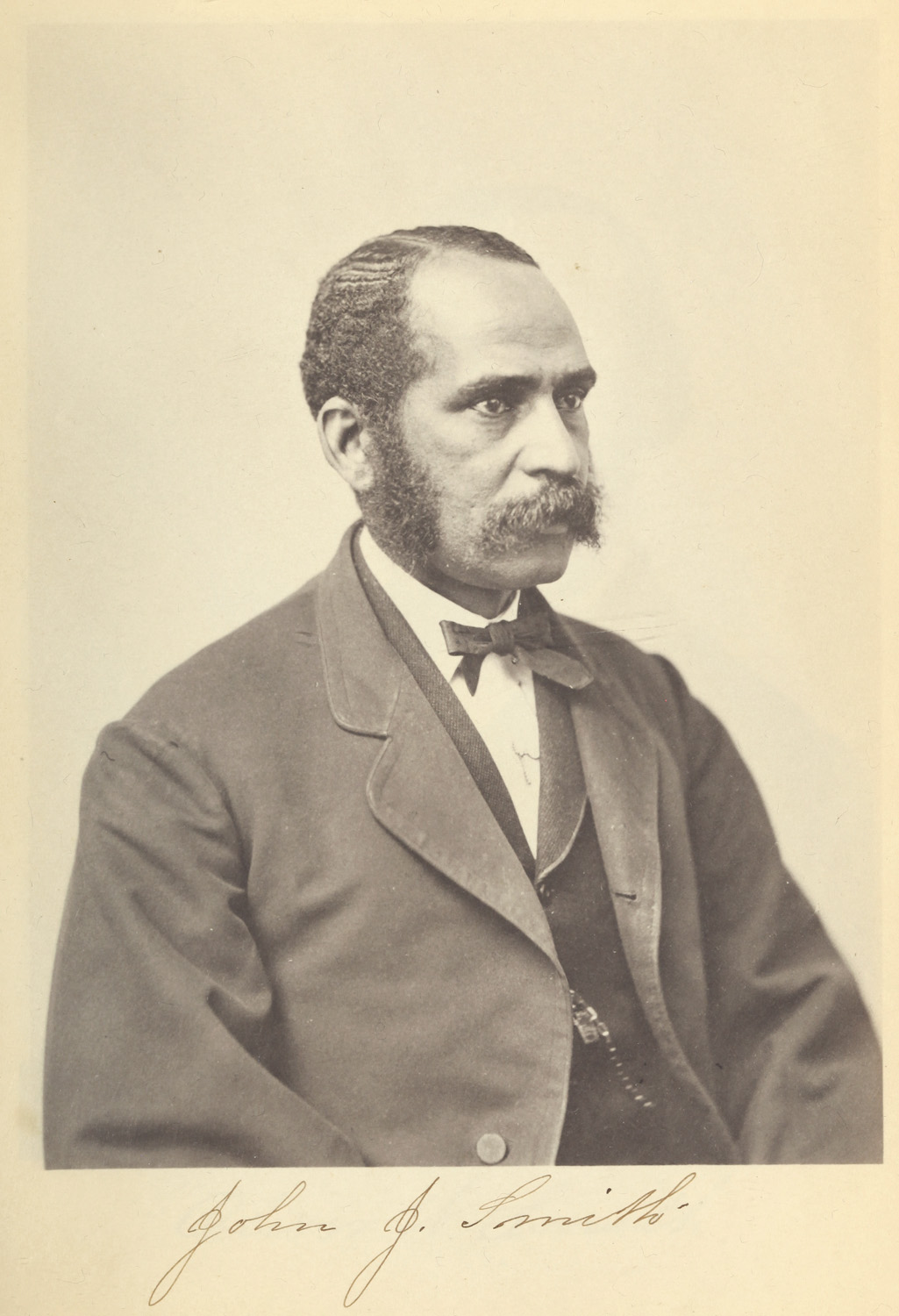

Member of the Massachusetts House of Representatives from the 6th Suffolk district
- In office 1868–1869
- In office 1869–1870 Serving with Linus Child and Harvey Jewell
- Succeeded by: George Lewis Ruffin; Hugh Flood
- In office 1872–1873 Serving with Frederic W. Lincoln Jr. and Charles R. Codman
- Preceded by: Harvey Jewell; George Lewis Ruffin; Hugh Flood

Member of the Boston Common Council
- In office 1878–1878 Serving with Uriel Crocker and Robert Means Thompson
- Preceded by: George Lewis Ruffin
- Succeeded by: Malcolm Greenough; Henry W. Swift

Personal details
- Born: November 2, 1820 Richmond, Virginia
- Died: November 4, 1906 (aged 86) Dorchester, Boston
- Resting place: Forest Hills Cemetery
- Party: Republican
- Spouse: Georgianna O. Smith
- Children: Elizabeth; Georgianna; Florence; Hamilton; Adelaide; Harriet
- Known for: Abolitionism

John James Smith (1820 – 1906) was a barber shop owner, abolitionist, a three-term Massachusetts state representative, and one of the first African-American members of the Boston Common Council. A Republican, he served three terms in the Massachusetts House of Representatives. He was born in Richmond Virginia. He took part in the California Gold Rush.

During the 1840s and 50s, Smith's barbershop on the north slope of Beacon Hill was a center of abolitionist activity, and provided shelter to freedom seekers on the Underground Railroad. During the Civil War, Smith recruited soldiers for the black regiments of Massachusetts.

While serving on the Boston Common Council in 1878, Smith was responsible for the hiring of Boston's first black police officer.

== Biography ==
=== Early life and education ===
Smith was born free in Richmond, Virginia, on November 2, 1820. At as youth he heard stories about Boston, and made up his mind to settle there. By the time he was 20, he had saved enough money to move. (Note: According to some sources, Smith arrived in Boston in 1848. His Boston Globe obituary indicates he arrived in 1840. In 1845, the Liberator reported that Smith was selling tickets to a fundraiser for the Boston-based New England Freedom Association.) In the 1840s, he opened a barbershop at the corner of Howard and Bulfinch Streets on Beacon Hill. To further his education, he went to night school.

=== Abolitionism and civil rights work ===
In the 1840s, Smith campaigned for the desegregation of Boston public schools. He was a supporter of Benjamin F. Roberts, who unsuccessfully sued the city in 1850 for the right to enroll his daughter in a white school.

Smith's barbershop became a gathering place for local abolitionists, including Lewis Hayden and Charles Sumner. He was active in the New England Freedom Association, an organization that assisted refugees from slavery. After the Fugitive Slave Act was passed in 1850, Smith sheltered refugees and helped with their escape plans. Notably, he sheltered Ellen and William Craft during their stay in Boston.

On February 15, 1851, Smith was one of the activists who helped free Shadrach Minkins from the court house in Boston, where he was being held under the Fugitive Slave Act. Two days later, he drove Minkins by buggy from a safe house in Cambridge, Massachusetts, to another in Concord. Smith was one of several people arrested in connection with the rescue, but could not be positively identified and was released. He was also involved in the failed attempt to rescue George Latimer in 1842.

During the Civil War, he was appointed by Governor John Albion Andrew to recruit officers for the Massachusetts African-American regiments. Later he served as a provost marshal in Washington, D.C.

=== Political career ===
Smith was one of the earliest Republicans in Massachusetts, and attended their first state party convention in Worcester. In 1868, he became the third African American to sit on the Massachusetts legislature when he was elected to represent Ward 6 in the state house of representatives. He was reelected in 1869 and 1872, making him the first black legislator to serve more than one term in Massachusetts.

In 1878, Smith was elected to the Boston Common Council, where he served for "a number of years" as one of its first African-American members. During his first year on the council, Smith was responsible for the hiring of Horatio J. Homer, the Boston Police Department's first black officer.

=== Personal life and legacy ===
Smith met his wife Georgianna, a multiracial woman from Nova Scotia, in the 1840s. The couple's first home was on Wilson's Lane in Boston. They raised six children. Their daughter Elizabeth graduated from the Boston Normal School and began teaching at the Phillips School in the early 1870s; she was likely the first black teacher in an integrated Boston public school.

In 1844, Smith co-founded the Bay State lodge of the Grand United Order of Odd Fellows. He was also a Prince Hall Mason. At the time of his death, he was reportedly the oldest Odd Fellow in the world, and the oldest Past Grand Master in Prince Hall Freemasonry. He was also a trustee of the A M. E. Zion Church.

Smith reportedly spent time in California during the Gold Rush of 1849. (Note: The Globe claims he spent "several years" in California, which contradicts the earlier claim, in the same article, that he was involved in the rescue of Shadrach Minkins in 1851.) In 1878, he moved to 86 Pinckney Street, where he lived until 1893. From there, he moved to Jamaica Plain, and around 1900 moved in with his two daughters at 45 Wellesley Park in Dorchester.

He died at his home in Dorchester on November 4, 1906, aged 86. His funeral was held in the A. M. E. Zion Church on Columbus Avenue, with Masonic services. He was buried in the Forest Hills Cemetery.

The John J. Smith House at 86 Pinckney Street is a Boston African American National Historic Site and is on the Black Heritage Trail.
