= History of African-American education =

The History of African-American education deals with the public and private schools at all levels used by African Americans in the United States and for the related policies and debates. Black schools, also referred to as "Negro schools" and "colored schools", were racially segregated schools in the United States that originated in the Reconstruction era after the American Civil War. They were created in Southern states under biracial Republican governments as free public schools for the formerly enslaved. All their students were blacks. After 1877, conservative whites took control across the South. They continued the black schools, but at a much lower funding rate than white schools.

== History ==
=== Slavery ===
White people denied education for African Americans during slavery. That, however, did not stop enslaved African Americans from creating their own hidden education systems. For example, enslaved African Americans would form secret groups to teach each other how to read and write. These groups and systems would have to be hidden due to great risk associated (usually threat of physical violence). Charity Bowery is quoted saying "I have seen Negros going away under large oaks and in secret places, sitting in the woods with spelling books." The whites' oppression of allowing education among slaves helped created the "unquenchable thirst for education" and "avidity for learning" during the Reconstruction era. As the result of Black activism, a number of schools were also set up in the North during this period, such as the African Free School in New York and the Abiel Smith School in Boston.

=== Roberts v. City of Boston ===
In the 1850 Roberts v. City of Boston court case, Benjamin F. Roberts brought suit on behalf of his five-year-old African American daughter Sarah Roberts, who tried to enroll in a nearby, predominantly white school. She was denied admission based on her race. This court case was an early effort to challenge racial segregation through the education system. It was a landmark court case that proved to enforce the ‘separate, but equal’ precedent, as Judge Shaw ruled that school officials did, in fact, have the authority to decline admission from some students based on race because it was not a violation of the black student's rights.

The Roberts v. City of Boston case likewise laid the groundwork for many future racial challenges for equal opportunity, especially in education. Although the Massachusetts Supreme Court ruled against the Roberts family, the hearing ultimately highlighted the injustice of segregation in the United States Education System. Additionally, the ideas from this challenge were known to herald the well-known 1954 Brown v. Board of Education case that declared the racial separation of public schools by state legislation was unconstitutional. The Sarah Roberts Case contributed significantly to the long history of societal conflict in civil rights that eventually led to reformation in the education system.

=== Reconstruction Era ===
During the Reconstruction Era (1863–1876) hundreds of schools for blacks were created in the South by the government, by white religious groups, and by the blacks themselves. Legislatures of Republican freedmen and whites established public schools for the first time during the Reconstruction era. After the war, Northern missionaries founded numerous private academies and colleges for freedmen across the South.

==== Creating private schools ====
Most of the major Protestant bodies participated in establishing, staffing and funding the schools. The American Missionary Association was especially active. They provided funding into the 20th century. The Catholic Church also established a few black schools via using nuns, such as St. Frances Academy in Baltimore (1828) and St. Mary's Academy in New Orleans (1867).

The all-black African Methodist Episcopal Church (AME) put a high premium on education. In the 19th century, the AME Church of Ohio collaborated with the Methodist Episcopal Church, a predominantly white denomination, in sponsoring the second independent historically black college (HBCU), Wilberforce University in Ohio. By 1880, AME operated over 2,000 schools, chiefly in the South, with 155,000 students. For school houses they used church buildings; the ministers and their wives were the teachers; the congregations raised the money to keep schools operating at a time the segregated public schools were starved of funds.

=== Freedman Bureau schools ===
The federal government through the Freedmen's Bureau, a part of the U.S. Army, created a vast network of schools in camps it operated for freed Blacks. Much of the leadership came from Northern blacks who had never been slaves who moved South. The African-American community engaged in a long-term struggle for quality public schools. Historian Hilary Green says it "was not merely a fight for access to literacy and education, but one for freedom, citizenship, and a new postwar social order." The black community and its white supporters in the North emphasized the critical role of education is the foundation for establishing equality in civil rights. Anti-literacy laws for both free and enslaved black people had been in force in many southern states since the 1830s, The widespread illiteracy made it urgent that high on the African-American agenda was creating new schooling opportunities, including both private schools and public schools for black children funded by state taxes. The states did pass suitable laws during Reconstruction, but the implementation was weak in most rural areas, and with uneven results in urban areas. After Reconstruction ended the tax money was limited, but local blacks and national religious groups and philanthropists helped out.

Integrated public schools meant local white teachers in charge, and they were not trusted. The black leadership generally supported segregated all-black schools. The black community wanted black principals and teachers, or (in private schools) highly supportive whites sponsored by northern churches. Public schools were segregated throughout the South during Reconstruction and afterward into the 1950s. New Orleans was a partial exception: its schools were usually integrated during Reconstruction.

In the era of Reconstruction, the Freedmen's Bureau opened 1000 schools across the South for black children using federal funds. Enrollments were high and enthusiastic. Overall, the Bureau spent $5 million to set up schools for blacks and by the end of 1865, more than 90,000 Freedmen were enrolled as students in public schools. The school curriculum resembled that of schools in the north. By the end of Reconstruction, however, state funding for black schools was minimal, and facilities were quite poor.

Many Freedman Bureau teachers were well-educated Yankee women motivated by religion and abolitionism. Half the teachers were southern whites; one-third were blacks, and one-sixth were northern whites. Black men slightly outnumbered black women. The salary was the strongest motivation except for the northerners, who were typically funded by northern organizations and had a humanitarian motivation. As a group, only the black cohort showed a commitment to racial equality; they were the ones most likely to remain teachers.

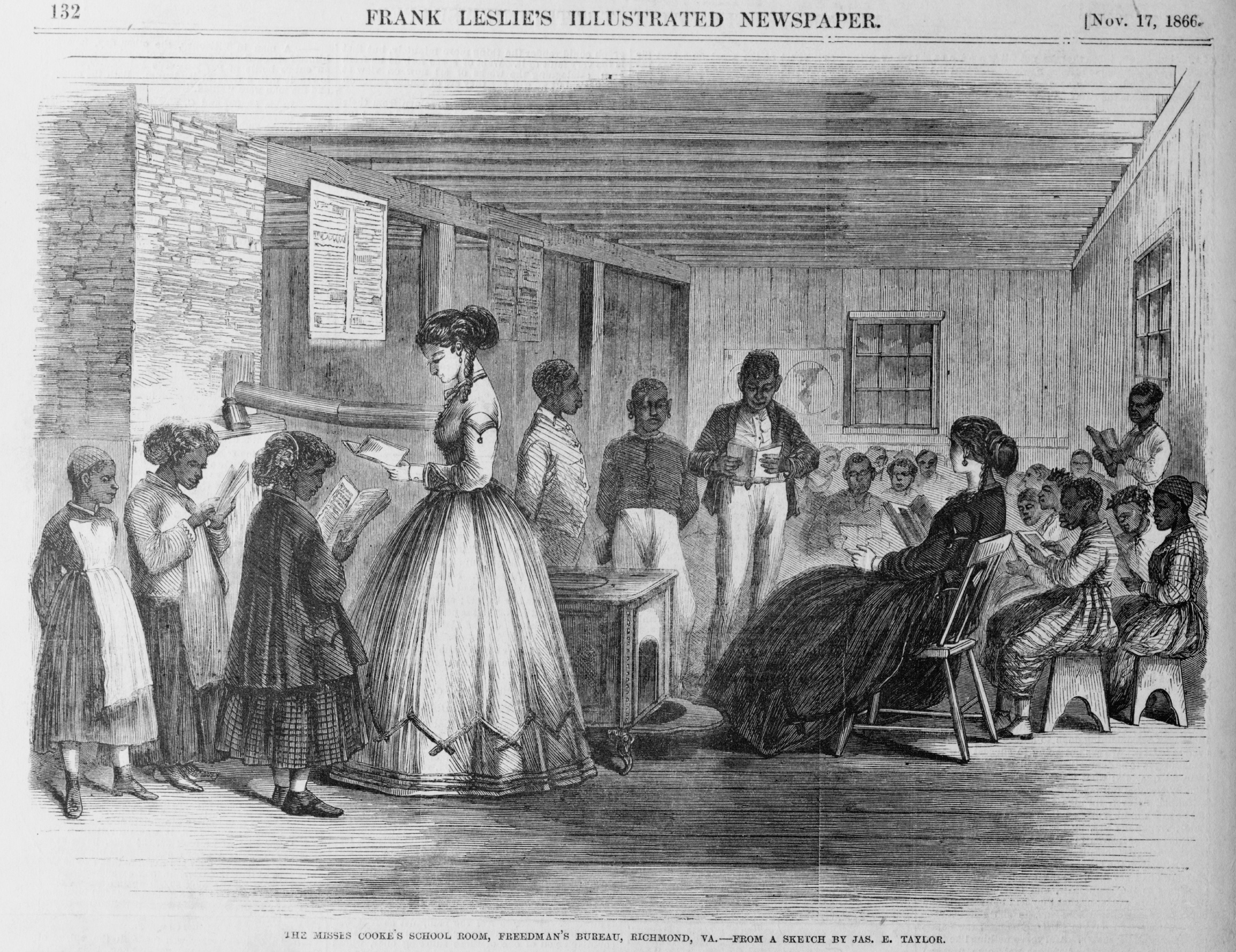
The Misses Cooke's school room in the Freedman's Bureau school in Richmond, Virginia, in 1866.

==== Southern states create public schools ====
Historian James D. Anderson argues that the freed slaves were the first Southerners "to campaign for universal, state-supported public education". Blacks in the Republican coalition played a critical role in establishing the principle in state constitutions for the first time during congressional Reconstruction. Some slaves had learned to read from White playmates or colleagues before formal education was allowed by law; African Americans started "native schools" before the end of the war; Sabbath schools were another widespread means that freedmen developed to teach literacy. When they gained suffrage, Black politicians took this commitment to public education to state constitutional conventions.

The Republicans created a system of public schools, which were segregated by race everywhere except New Orleans. Generally, elementary and a few secondary schools were built in most cities, and occasionally in the countryside, but the South had few cities.

The rural areas faced many difficulties opening and maintaining public schools. In the country, the public school was often a one-room affair that attracted about half the younger children. The teachers were poorly paid, and their pay was often in arrears. Conservatives contended the rural schools were too expensive and unnecessary for a region where the vast majority of people were cotton or tobacco farmers. They had no expectation of better education for their residents. One historian found that the schools were less effective than they might have been because "poverty, the inability of the states to collect taxes, and inefficiency and corruption in many places prevented successful operation of the schools". After Reconstruction ended and White elected officials disenfranchised Blacks and imposed Jim Crow laws, they consistently underfunded Black institutions, including the schools.

According to Barry Crouch, George Ruby, a mulatto from New England was a leader in black education in Louisiana from 1863 to 1866. The Army assigned Ruby to the Freedmen's Bureau. His roles encompassed that of a teacher, a school administrator, and a mobile inspector for the Bureau. His responsibilities included assessing local conditions, assisting in the establishment of black schools, and evaluating the performance of Bureau field officers. Ruby's endeavors were met with a positive response from the black population, who eagerly embraced education, but they also faced vehement opposition, including physical violence, from numerous planters and other white individuals. Ruby's career exemplifies the role played by the Black carpetbagger during the Civil War and Reconstruction era in Louisiana.

According to Philip C. Kimball, under the leadership of Thomas Noble and the federal government's Freedmen's Bureau, a school system for Kentucky Blacks was created in the late 1860s. They persevered against the hostility of scattered white mobs, the inadequate training of some teachers, and minimal local or state tax support. With strong support from the black community and Northern churches, the new system grew rapidly in 1868 and 1869 to reach parity with the established white school system. Although federal funding ended in 1870, black schools multiplied until full state funding was assured in 1882.

=== Higher education: creating colleges ===
The Republican governments in every state founded state colleges for freedmen, such as Alcorn State University in Mississippi. They were funded by the state governments, and were kept in operation by the states after the Republicans lost control of state governments in the 1872–1877 period. To educate elementary school teachers the states and cities also created "normal schools" as part of the new high schools. They produced generations of teachers who were integral to the education of African American children under the segregated system. By 1900, the majority of African Americans were literate.

In the late 19th century, the federal government established land grant legislation to provide funding for higher education across the United States. Learning that Blacks were excluded from land grant colleges in the South, in 1890 the federal government insisted that Southern states establish Black state institutions as land grant colleges to provide for Black higher education, in order to continue to receive funds for their already established White schools. Some states classified their Black state colleges as land grant institutions. Former Congressman John Roy Lynch wrote: "there are very many liberal, fair-minded and influential Democrats in the state [Mississippi] who are strongly in favor of having the state provide for the liberal education of both races".

According to a 2020 study by economist Trevon Logan, increases in Black politicians led to greater tax revenue, which was put towards public education spending (and land tenancy reforms). Logan finds that this led to greater literacy among Black men.

At the beginning of the Reconstruction era, teachers in integrated schools were predominantly white. Black educators and leaders alleged that many of these white teachers "effectively convinced black students that they were inferior." This led to a distrust of the structure of public education at that time.

Across the entire South Virtually all public and private schools had either an all-white or an all-black student body in the 19th century and down to the 1950s. Berea College was the major exception, but a state law in Kentucky forced it to stop enrolling blacks in 1904. New Orleans was a partial exception: its elementary and high schools were partly integrated during Reconstruction. Schools for black students typically had both white and black teachers and other employees.

=== Jim Crow era after the end of Reconstruction in 1876 ===
After the white Democrats regained power in Southern states in the 1870s, during the next two decades they imposed Jim Crow laws mandating segregation. They disfranchised most blacks and many poor whites through poll taxes and literacy tests. Services for black schools (and any black institution) routinely received far less financial support than white schools. In addition, the South was extremely poor for years in the aftermath of the war, its infrastructure destroyed, and dependent on an agricultural economy despite falling cotton prices. Into the 20th century, black schools had second-hand books and buildings (see Station One School), and teachers were paid less and had larger classes. In Washington, D.C., however, because public school teachers were federal employees, African-American and Caucasian teachers were paid the same.

The Tilden-Hayes compromise was enacted in 1877 between Samuel Tilden and Rutherford Hayes, which mainly meant a final withdrawal of the federal troops from the disputed southern states. With this withdrawal of federal troops meant more segregation and less national control of southern states K-12 public education system.

The Virginia Constitution of 1870 mandated a system of public education for the first time, but the newly established schools were operated on a segregated basis. In these early schools, which were mostly rural, as was characteristic of the South, classes were most often taught by a single teacher, who taught all subjects, ages, and grades. Chronic underfunding led to constantly over-populated schools, despite the relatively low percentage of African-American students in schools overall. In 1900, the average black school in Virginia had 37 percent more pupils in attendance than the average white school. This discrimination continued for several years, as demonstrated by the fact that in 1937–38, in Halifax County, Virginia, the total value of white school property was $561,262, contrasted to only $176,881 for the county's black schools.

=== 20th century ===
Continuing to see education as the primary route of advancement and critical for the race, many black people went into teaching, which had high respect as a profession. Segregated schools for black people were underfunded in the South and ran on shortened schedules in rural areas. Despite segregation, in Washington, DC by contrast, as Federal employees, black and white teachers were paid on the same scale. Outstanding black teachers in the North received advanced degrees and taught in highly regarded schools, which trained the next generation of leaders in cities such as Chicago, Washington, and New York, whose black populations had increased in the 20th century due to the Great Migration.

Education was one of the major achievements of the black community in the 19th century. Blacks in Reconstruction governments had supported the establishment of public education in every Southern state. Despite the difficulties, with the enormous eagerness of freedmen for education, by 1900 the African-American community had trained and put to work 30,000 African-American teachers in the South. In addition, a majority of the black population had achieved literacy. Not all the teachers had a full 4-year college degree in those years, but the shorter terms of normal schools were part of the system of teacher training in both the North and the South to serve the many new communities across the frontier. African-American teachers got many children and adults started on education.

Northern alliances had helped fund normal schools and colleges to teach African-American teachers, as well as create other professional classes. The American Missionary Association, supported largely by the Congregational and Presbyterian churches, had helped fund and staff numerous private schools and colleges in the South, who collaborated with black communities to train generations of teachers and other leaders. Major 20th-century industrialists, such as George Eastman of Rochester, New York, acted as philanthropists and made substantial donations to black educational institutions such as Tuskegee Institute.

In 1862, the Congress passed the Morrill Act, which established federal funding of a land grant college in each state, but 17 states refused to admit black students to their land grant colleges. In response, Congress enacted the second Morrill Act of 1890, which required states that excluded blacks from their existing land grant colleges to open separate institutions and to equitably divide the funds between the schools. The colleges founded in response to the second Morill Act became today's public historically black colleges and universities (HBCUs) and, together with the private HBCUs and the unsegregated colleges in the North and West, provided higher educational opportunities to African Americans. Federally funded extension agents from the land grant colleges spread knowledge about scientific agriculture and home economics to rural communities with agents from the HBCUs focusing on black farmers and families.

In the 19th century, blacks formed fraternal organizations across the South and the North, including an increasing number of women's clubs. They created and supported institutions that increased education, health and welfare for black communities. After the turn of the 20th century, black men and women also began to found their own college fraternities and sororities to create additional networks for lifelong service and collaboration. For example, Alpha Phi Alpha the first black intercollegiate fraternity was founded at Cornell University in 1906. These were part of the new organizations that strengthened independent community life under segregation.

Tuskegee took the lead in spreading industrial education to Africa, typically in cooperation with church missionary efforts.

=== Rosenwald Schools ===
Julius Rosenwald was a philanthropist who owned Sears, Roebuck, and Company. He was responsible for establishing the Rosenwald Fund. After meeting Booker T. Washington in 1911, Rosenwald created his fund to improve the education of southern blacks by building schools, mostly in rural areas. More than 5,300 were built in the South by the time of Rosenwald's death in 1932. He created a system requiring matching public funds and interracial community cooperation for the maintenance and operation of schools. Black communities essentially taxed themselves twice to raise money to support new schools, often donating land and labor to get them built.

With increasing urbanization, Rosenwald schools in many rural areas were abandoned. Some have been converted into community centers and in more urban areas, maintained or renovated as schools. In modern times the National Trust for Historic Preservation has called Rosenwald Schools as worthy of preservation as "beacons of African American education". By 2009 many communities restored Rosenwald schools.

=== Fight for equal funding ===
In the 1930s the National Association for the Advancement of Colored People (NAACP) launched a national campaign to achieve equal schools within the "separate but equal" framework of the Supreme Court's 1896 decision in Plessy v. Ferguson. White hostility towards this campaign kept black schools from necessary resources. According to Rethinking Schools magazine, "Over the first three decades of the 20th century, the funding gap between black and white schools in the South increasingly widened. NAACP studies of unequal expenditures in the mid-to-late 1920s found that Georgia spent $4.59 per year on each African-American child as opposed to $36.29 on each white child. A study by Doxey Wilkerson at the end of the 1930s found that only 19 percent of 14- to 17-year-old African Americans were enrolled in high school." The NAACP won several victories with this campaign, particularly around salary equalization.

=== Citizenship Schools in 1950s ===
Septima Clark was an American educator, civil rights activist, and the creator of citizenship schools in 1957. Clark's project initially developed from secret literacy courses she held for African American adults in the Deep South. Citizenship schools helped black southerners push for the right to vote, as well as create activists and leaders for the Civil Rights Movement, using a curriculum that instilled self-pride, cultural pride, literacy, and a sense of one's citizenship rights. The citizenship school project trained over 10,000 citizenship school teachers who led over 800 citizenship schools throughout the South that was responsible for registering approximately 700,000 African Americans to vote.

=== Freedom Schools in 1960s ===
An activist of the Student Nonviolent Coordinating Committee (SNCC) in 1964, Charles Cobb, proposed that the organization sponsor a network of Freedom Schools. Originally, Freedom Schools were organized to achieve social, political, and economic equality by teaching African American students to be social change agents for the Civil Rights Movement; Black educators and activists later utilized the schools to provide schooling in areas where black public schools were closed in reaction to the Brown v. Board of Education ruling. More than 40 of these free schools existed by the end of the summer in 1964 serving close to 3,000 students.

=== Desegregation ===
Public schools were technically desegregated in the United States in 1954 by the U.S. Supreme Court decision in Brown vs Board of Education. Some schools, such as the Baltimore Polytechnic Institute, were forced into a limited form of desegregation before that; with the Baltimore City Public School System voting to desegregate the prestigious advanced placement program in 1952. However, many were still de facto segregated due to inequality in housing and patterns of racial segregation in neighborhoods. President Dwight Eisenhower enforced the Supreme Court's decision by sending US Army troops to Little Rock, Arkansas to protect the "Little Rock Nine" students' entry to school in 1957, thus setting a precedent for the Executive Branch to enforce Supreme Court rulings related to racial integration. He was the first president since Reconstruction to send Federal troops into the South to protect the rights of African Americans. Similar high-profile incidents happened during other desegregation efforts in other southern states, including in New Orleans.

==== Busing ====
In the 1971 Swann v. Charlotte-Mecklenburg Board of Education ruling, the Supreme Court allowed the federal government to force mandatory busing on Charlotte, North Carolina and other cities nationwide in order to affect student assignment based on race and to attempt to further integrate schools. This was meant to combat patterns of de facto segregation that had developed in northern as well as southern cities. The 1974 Milliken v. Bradley decision placed a limitation on Swann when the court ruled that students could only be bused across district lines when evidence existed of de jure segregation across multiple school districts. In the 1970s and 1980s, under federal court supervision, many school districts implemented mandatory busing plans within their districts. Busing was controversial because it took students out of their own neighborhoods and further away from their parents' supervision and support. Even young students sometimes had lengthy bus rides each day. Districts also experimented with creating incentives, for instance, the creation of magnet schools to attract different students voluntarily.

== 21st century ==
=== Re-segregation ===
According to the Civil Rights Project at Harvard University, the desegregation of U.S. public schools peaked in 1988; since then, schools have become more segregated because of changes in demographic residential patterns with continuing growth in suburbs and new communities. Jonathan Kozol, author of The Shame of the Nation: The Restoration of Apartheid Schooling in America, reports that as of 2005, the proportion of Black students at majority-white schools was at "a level lower than in any year since 1968." Changing population patterns, with dramatically increased growth in the South and Southwest, decreases in old industrial cities, and much-increased immigration of new ethnic groups, have altered school populations in many areas.

Black school districts continue to try various programs to improve student and school performance, including magnet schools and special programs related to the economic standing of families. After desegregation ended in Omaha, Nebraska in 1999, the Omaha Public Schools proposed incorporating some suburban districts within city limits to enlarge its school-system catchment area. It wanted to create a "one tax, one school" system that would also allow it to create magnet programs to increase diversity in now predominantly white schools. Ernest Chambers, a 34-year-serving African-American state senator from North Omaha, Nebraska, believed a different solution was needed. Some observers said that in practical terms, public schools in Omaha had been re-segregated since the end of busing in 1999.

In 2006, Chambers offered an amendment to the Omaha school reform bill in the Nebraska State Legislature which would provide for creation of three school districts in Omaha according to current racial demographics: black, white and Hispanic, with local community control of each district. He believed this would give the African-American community the chance to control a district in which their children were the majority. Chambers’ amendment was controversial. Opponents to the measure described it as "state-sponsored segregation".

The authors of a 2003 Harvard study on re-segregation believe current trends in the South of white teachers leaving predominantly black schools is an inevitable result of federal court decisions limiting former methods of civil rights-era protections, such as busing and affirmative action in school admissions. Teachers and principals cite other issues, such as economic and cultural barriers in schools with high rates of poverty, as well as teachers' choices to work closer to home or in higher-performing schools. In some areas black teachers are also leaving the profession, resulting in teacher shortages.

== See also ==
- Education during the slave period in the United States
- African-American culture
- African Americans
- Freedmen's Schools
- Historically black colleges and universities
  - Fisk University
  - Howard University
  - Meharry Medical College
  - Tuskegee University
    - Booker T. Washington
- Racial integration
  - Timeline of the civil rights movement
  - civil rights movement covers 1954 to 1968.
  - Civil rights movement (1865–1896) covers the Reconstruction era and post-Reconstruction era
  - Civil rights movement (1896–1954), the Jim Crow era in the United States
  - Brown v. Board of Education, Supreme Court outlaws segregated schooling in 1954
    - United States school desegregation case law (category)
    - The Shame of the Nation: The Restoration of Apartheid Schooling in America by Jonathan Kozol
