= Lewis Hayden =

American abolitionist, lecturer, businessman and politician (1811–1889)

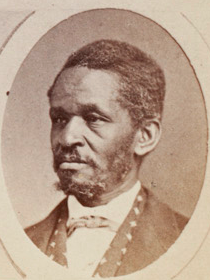
- Hayden, c. 1873

Member of the Massachusetts House of Representatives
- In office January 1, 1873 – January 7, 1874

Personal details
- Born: December 2, 1811 Kentucky
- Died: April 7, 1889 (aged 77) Boston
- Resting place: Woodlawn Cemetery, Everett, Massachusetts
- Party: Republican
- Spouse: Harriet Hayden

Lewis Hayden (December 2, 1811 – April 7, 1889) escaped slavery in Kentucky with his family and reached Canada. He established a school for African Americans before moving to Boston, Massachusetts. There he became an abolitionist, lecturer, businessman, and politician. Before the American Civil War, he and his wife Harriet Hayden aided numerous fugitive slaves on the Underground Railroad, often sheltering them at their house.

Hayden was elected in 1873 as a Republican representative from Boston to the Massachusetts state legislature. He helped found numerous black lodges of Freemasons. Located on the north side of Beacon Hill, the Lewis and Harriet Hayden House has been designated a National Historic Site on the Black Heritage Trail in Boston.

== Biography ==
=== Early life ===
Lewis Hayden was born into slavery in Lexington, Kentucky, in 1811, as one of a family of 25. (Note: The National Park Service said he was born in 1812. The Afro-American Museum says that he was born in 1816.) His mother was of mixed race, including African, European, and Native American ancestry; slavery of Native Americans had been prohibited since the 18th century. If his mother had been able to show direct maternal Native American ancestry, she would have had grounds for a freedom suit for herself and her children. According to the principle of partus sequitur ventrem adopted by the slave states in the 17th century, the children's status in the colonies followed that of the mother. Children of white women and Native American women were thus born free. Lewis's father was a slave "sold off early". (Note: Hayden's mother had rejected an offer "of a base nature" from a man from a Masonic Lodge. He had her arrested and she began to have "crazy turns" after she had been tortured and flogged. After she made several suicide attempts, 7 or 8-year-old Hayden and his siblings were able to see their mother. He became afraid when she said, "I'll fix you so that they'll never get you." She was tied up and taken away.)

Hayden was first owned by a Presbyterian minister, Rev. Adam Rankin. He sold off the boy's brothers and sisters in preparation for moving to Pennsylvania; he traded 10-year-old Hayden for two carriage horses to a man who traveled the state selling clocks. The travels with his new master allowed Hayden to hear varying opinions of slavery, including its classification as a crime by some people. When he was 14, the American Revolutionary War soldier Marquis de Lafayette tipped his hat to Hayden while visiting Kentucky. This helped inspire Hayden to believe he was worthy of respect and to hate slavery.

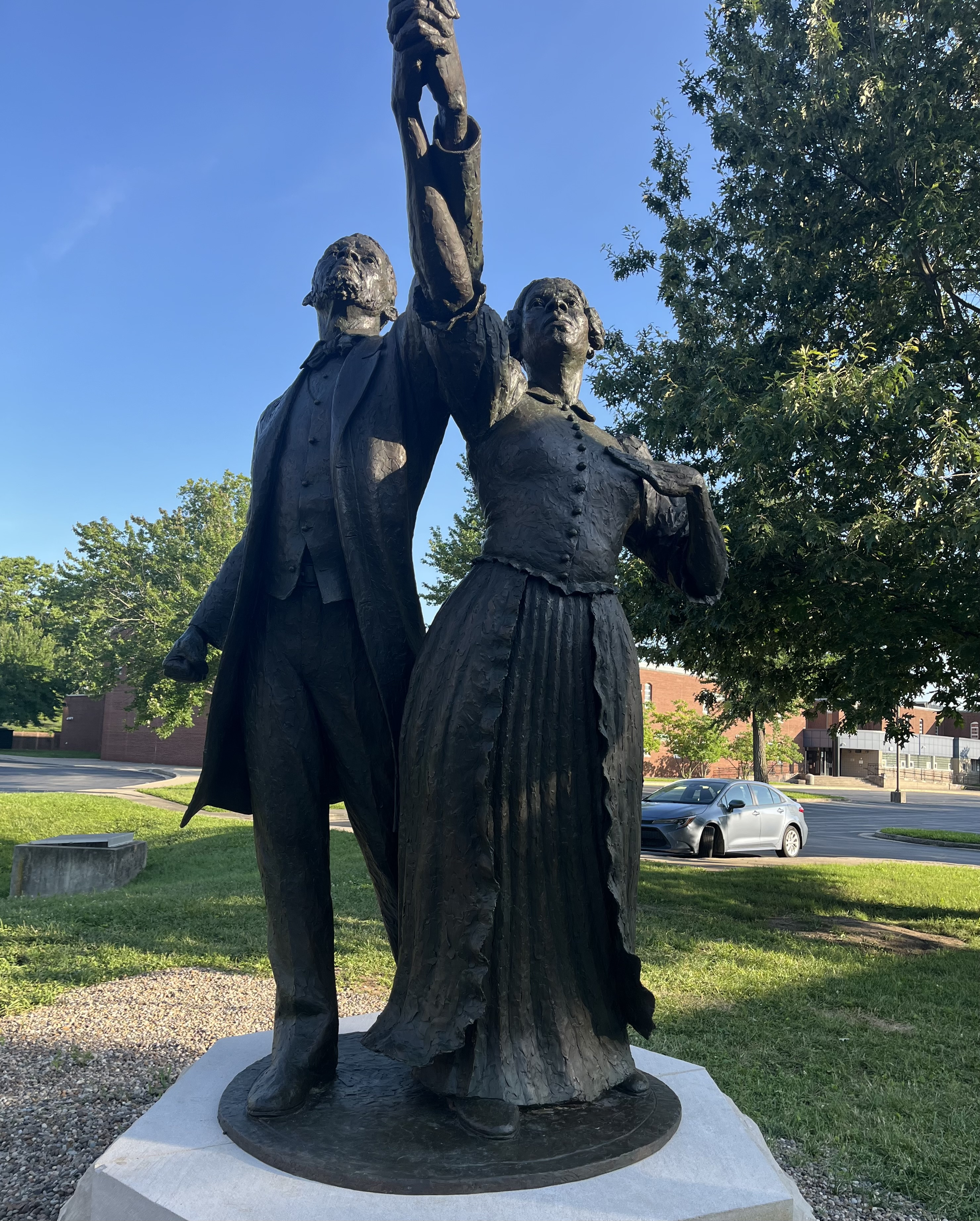
Unveiled in June 2025, a bronze statue entitled Towards Freedom by artist Basil Watson honors the Haydens. An inscription quotes author bell hooks “True resistance begins with people confronting pain…and wanting to do something to change it.”

In the mid-1830s, Hayden married Esther Harvey, also a slave. She and their son were sold to U.S. Senator Henry Clay, who sold them both to the Deep South. Hayden never saw them again. (Note: Henry Clay claimed he had not bought, nor sold, Lewis Hayden's wife and child. He had confused Lewis Hayden with another man Lewis at first, then stated he never knew Lewis Hayden. But Hayden provided detailed information about houses where his wife was assigned after Clay bought her and details of her sale.) In the 1840s, Hayden taught himself to read, although he was owned by a man who whipped him.

Hayden approached other men, asking them to buy him and proposing that they hire him out for fees to return their investment, but asking them to allow Hayden to keep some earnings and purchase his freedom. The men were Lewis Baxter, an insurance office clerk, and Thomas Grant, an oil manufacturer and tallow chandler, and they did buy him. The men hired Hayden out to work at Lexington's Phoenix Hotel. He started to save his share of earnings for future freedom.

By 1842, Hayden married a second time, to Harriet Bell, who was also enslaved. He cared for her son Joseph as his stepson. Harriet and Joseph were owned by Patterson Bain. After his marriage, Hayden began making plans to escape to the North, as he feared his family might be split up again.

=== Escape and freedom ===
In the fall of 1844, Hayden met Calvin Fairbank, a Methodist minister who was studying at Oberlin College and had become involved in the Underground Railroad. He asked Hayden, "Why do you want your freedom?" Hayden responded, "Because I am a man."

Fairbank and Delia Webster, a teacher from Vermont who was working in Kentucky, acquired a carriage and traveled with the Haydens to aid their escape. The Haydens covered their faces with flour to appear white and escape detection; at times of danger, they would hide their son Joseph under the seat. They traveled from Lexington to Ripley, Ohio, on a cold, rainy night. Helped by other abolitionists, such as John Rankin, the Haydens continued north along the Underground Railroad, eventually reaching Canada.

When Fairbank and Webster returned to Lexington, they were arrested. The driver was picked up and whipped 50 times until he confessed to the events of the escape. Webster served several months of a two-year prison sentence for helping the Haydens and was pardoned. Fairbank was sentenced to 15 years, five years for each slave he helped to freedom. After four years he was pardoned when Hayden, in effect, ransomed him. Hayden's previous owner agreed to a pardon for Fairbank if paid $650. Hayden by then was living in Boston and quickly raised the money from 160 people to pay this amount.

From Canada, the Haydens moved in 1845 to Detroit in the free state of Michigan. As a gateway to Canada, it was a major center of fugitive slaves. While there Hayden founded a school for black children, as well as the brick church of the Colored Methodist Society (now Bethel Church). Deciding he wanted to be at the center of anti-slavery activity, Hayden and his family moved to Boston, Massachusetts, in January 1846, which had many residents who strongly supported abolitionism. After getting settled, Hayden owned and ran a clothing store on Cambridge Street.

=== Anti-slavery efforts ===
==== Lecturer ====
In Massachusetts, Hayden began work as an agent, or traveling speaker and organizer, for the American Anti-Slavery Society. (Note: In 1847 Lewis and Harriet Hayden began a journey to Vermont that involved traveling on the railroad. When the conductor refused to honor their first-class tickets because of their race, the Haydens protested and forced the railroad into compliance. Rather than admit them to the all-white seating area, however, the railroad ordered a special first-class car only for them.)

Hayden worked with abolitionist Erasmus Darwin Hudson and John M. Brown. In February 1848, Hayden responded to a letter from the society informing him of "his agency being stopped." He had already spent about two months' income to establish his family and himself for the lecture tour; he did not have the fare for his return home. He wrote to the society: "You all know it is me jest three years from slavery ... if I am not Wendell Phillips now, it ought not to appear what shall be. I shall do all I can to make myself a man."

In his history of that period, writer Stephen Kantrowitz wrote of Hayden:

We do not know what route he took home from western New York to Detroit, nor what hardships he endured on the way. We do know that he was able to move past his disappointment and self-doubt and to assert himself as a self-confident citizen among equals. Slavery had taught him to expect trials and rebukes, and they did not break him.

The Boston City Directory for 1849–50 lists Hayden as a lecturer.

==== Underground Railroad ====
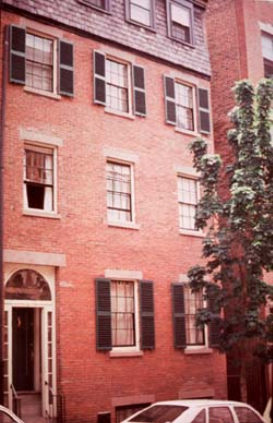
Lewis and Harriet Hayden House, 66 Phillips Street, Boston (now a private residence), Underground Railroad station.

The Haydens routinely cared for fugitive slaves at their home, which served as a boarding house. Guests included Ellen and William Craft, who escaped from slavery in 1848. Hayden prevented slave catchers from taking the Crafts by threatening to blow up his home with gunpowder if they tried to reclaim the pair. Records from the Boston Vigilance Committee, of which he was a member, indicate that scores of people received aid and safe shelter at the Hayden home between 1850 and 1860. (Note: Of an estimated 250 fugitive slaves who came through Boston, 25% are thought to have passed through the Hayden House. Roy E. Finkenbine in the American National Biography, wrote that Hayden had sheltered hundreds of fugitive slaves over the years in his home.)

Hayden and his wife were visited by the author Harriet Beecher Stowe:

When, in 1853, Mrs. Harriet Beecher Stowe came to the Liberator Office, 21 Cornhill, to get facts for her Key to Uncle Tom's Cabin, she was taken by Mr. R.F. Wallcutt and myself over to Lewis Hayden's house in Southnac Street, thirteen newly escaped slaves of all colors and sizes were brought in into one room for her to see. Though Mrs. Stowe had written wonderful "Uncle Tom" at the request of Dr. Bailey, of Washington, for the National Era, expressly to show up the workings of the Fugitive Slave-Law, yet she had never seen such a company of 'fugitives' together before.

— Anonymous

=== Merchant ===
Hayden opened a clothing store in 1849 at 107 Cambridge Street. It became the second-largest business owned by a black man in Boston. The financial crisis of 1857 caused a decline in sales, so Hayden closed that shop and set up business in a smaller store. When that store was burned out, he went bankrupt and "took to peddling jewelry".

=== Vigilance Committee ===
Hayden served on the Boston Vigilance Committee, which had 207 members; 5 were black. He was elected to the executive committee and worked closely with William Lloyd Garrison. Hayden conducted "daring acts of defiance against the Fugitive Slave Law" of 1850. At a meeting at Samuel Snowden's [May Street Church], which included reading of the act, Hayden said: "... safety was to be obtained only by an united and persevering resistance of this ungodly law ..."

In American National Biography, Roy E. Finkenbine wrote:

After the passage of the Fugitive Slave Act of 1850, Hayden worked tirelessly to fight its enforcement .... As a member of the executive board of the Boston Vigilance Committee, which was created to aid and protect fugitive slaves in the city, he often functioned as a liaison between white and black activists, including members of the Twelfth Baptist Church, to which he belonged. He personally fed and housed hundreds of runaways and used his clothing store to outfit many more.

Hayden was one of the men who helped rescue fugitive slave Shadrach Minkins from federal custody in 1851. For that action, he was arrested and tried, but his prosecution resulted in a hung jury. He played significant roles in the attempted rescue of Anthony Burns and in resisting legal authorities in the case of Thomas Sims, and is believed to have shot and killed U.S. Marshal James Batchelder.

In addition, Hayden contributed money to abolitionist John Brown, in preparation for his raid on Harper's Ferry.

=== Political activities ===
Hayden was a longtime supporter of John A. Andrew, who became Massachusetts governor in 1861. In his book, The Negro in the Civil War, Benjamin Quarles noted the men's relationship:

Hayden had been the first to suggest to John A. Andrew that he run for governor; on Thanksgiving Day in 1862 Governor Andrew was to come down from Beacon Hill and have turkey dinner at the Haydens.

Hayden was appointed to a patronage position as a messenger in the Secretary of State's office.

In 1873, Hayden was elected to one term as a representative from Boston to the lower house of the Massachusetts General Court. He supported the movement to erect a statue in honor of Crispus Attucks, a black and Native American man who was the first person killed in the Boston Massacre, at the beginning of the American Revolution. According to The Boston Herald, Hayden was in frail health during the "unveiling of the monument" ceremony and was unable to attend it in 1888, and the event was attended by many of Hayden's friends that gave him victory cheers at the event.

In the early 1880s, Hayden helped bring Julius Caesar Chappelle into Republican politics. Chappelle was a popular Republican legislator from 1883 to 1886 of Ward 9, which included the Beacon Hill area of Boston, MA. According to the Boston Daily Globe obituary of Julius C. Chappelle who died in 1904, when Chappelle lived in the "West End, he attracted the attention of the late Lewis Hayden, who brought him (Julius Caesar Chappelle) into the republican ranks of old ward 9, as a registrar for the colored voters in that ward." Chappelle was very successful in registering voters, which helped earn him his later place in the state legislature. Chappelle was also an alternate to the Republican National Convention that nominated James G. Blaine, and Chappelle was the only African-American on the Republican Senate Committee. During the Crispus Attucks monument unveiling in 1888, when Hayden could not attend due to frail health, Chappelle was president of the senate and along with others at the event gave homage to Hayden. .

=== Freemason ===
Hayden was active in the Freemasons, which had numerous black members who worked to abolish slavery, including David Walker, Thomas Paul, John T. Hilton and Martin Delany. He criticized the organization for its racial discrimination, and helped found numerous black Freemason chapters. Hayden advanced to Grand Master of the Prince Hall Freemasonry. After the American Civil War, he published several works commenting on these issues and encouraging participation by blacks: Caste among Masons (1866), Negro Masonry (1871), and co-author of Masonry Among Colored Men in Massachusetts. Following the war and emancipation, Hayden traveled throughout the South working to found and support newly established African-American Masonic lodges. In this period, there was a rapid growth in new, independent African-American fraternal and religious organizations in the South.

=== Civil War ===
Hayden was a recruiter for the 54th Massachusetts Regiment of the United States Colored Troops. His son served in the Union Navy during the Civil War and was killed.

=== Death ===
Hayden died in 1889. Every seat of the 1200 in the Charles Street AME Church was taken for his funeral, and Lucy Stone was among those who gave a eulogy.

He is buried in Woodlawn Cemetery in Everett, Massachusetts. Harriet died in 1894 and left $5,000, (~$166,211 in 2025) the entirety of their estate, to the Harvard University for scholarships for African American medical students. It was believed to have been the first, and perhaps only, endowment to a university by a former slave.

=== Legacy ===
The following was printed in The Liberator in 1855, and he had more to accomplish:

Hayden is a remarkable man — one who has seen much both of slavery and freedom. ... Mr. Hayden has the confidence of all good men at the North, and his acquaintance is cultivated by most of our leading politicians. He is a noble example of what freedom will do for a man. ... he has pursued a high and honorable course, doing much to elevate the colored population of our city, and has established himself in a respectable business — thus proving conclusively that a colored man can become a man of business, and evidencing to the world the practical results of freedom.

In June, 2025 in Lexington, KY the Haydens were honored with the unveiling of a bronze statue entitled Towards Freedom by artist Basil Watson. The monument also honors the Underground Railroad that aided in their escape in 1844. The statue of the couple, holding clasped hands up in both joy and determination, stands on the corner of North Limestone and Fourth Street is a monument to the Haydens and the many other enslaved people traveled north on Limestone to cross the Ohio River into the non slave holding states. The Lexington Freedom Train is a grassroots organization that combines neighborhood residents with historians including Yvonne Giles who researched the Haydens’ life. Public and private donations financed the project.

== Lewis and Harriet Hayden House ==
In 1849 or 1850, the Haydens moved into the house at 66 Phillips (then Southac) Street, in Boston's Beacon Hill neighborhood. In 1853, the house was purchased by their colleague Francis Jackson of the anti-slavery Vigilance Committee. The African American Museum hypothesized that may have been done "to assure that Hayden would not be harassed in his Underground Railroad activities."

The Haydens routinely cared for fugitive slaves at their home, which served as a boarding house. Records from the Boston Vigilance Committee, of which Lewis was a member, indicate that scores of people received aid and safe shelter at the Hayden home between 1850 and 1860. In 1865, Harriet Hayden bought the house from Francis Jackson's estate.

The Lewis and Harriet Hayden House has been designated a National Historic Site; it is one of the sites on the Black Heritage Trail maintained by the National Park Service. Still used as a private residence, the house is not open to visitors.

== See also ==
- 1873 Massachusetts legislature
