= Isabella Holmes (abolitionist) =

Boston abolitionist

- Born: 1810
- Died: 1897 (aged 86–87)
- Spouse: Henry Holmes
- Father: Samuel Snowden

Isabella Holmes (1810 - c.1897) was an African-American abolitionist in Boston, Massachusetts. She housed and protected African-American freedom seekers in her home on Holmes Alley, as a major operator of the secret network of safe houses that made up the Underground Railroad. She worked on the Underground Railroad alongside well-known abolitionists like Harriet & Lewis Hayden. Isabella Holmes was part of the community of free Black Bostonian women in the Beacon Hill neighborhood that operated the Underground Railroad.

She was born in 1810 to Reverend Samuel Snowden, the first Black Methodist pastor in Boston. She married a barber, Henry Holmes.

== Activism ==
Following the enactment of the Fugitive Slave Act of 1850, Isabella Holmes sheltered and protected 12 freedom seekers in her home in November 1850 as they left the South and moved into the North. She was a major operator of the Underground Railroad alongside Harriet and Lewis Hayden. This was recorded in Boston abolitionist Francis Jackson's account book, when he was the treasurer of the Boston Vigilance Committee and attended the Fugitive Slave Convention. Along with Henry David Thoreau, Isabella Holmes housed and protected a freedom seeker named Henry Williams.

Isabella Holmes was a member of the Boston Vigilance Committee. She and other members oversaw most of the relief work seeing to the needs of freedom seekers in Boston. Isabella Holmes donated to the Samaritan Asylum for Colored Indigent Children in 1837 which was established by the Boston Female Anti-Slavery Society and Maria Weston Chapman, and later managed by the Massachusetts Female Emancipation Society.

Isabella Holmes was a member of the New England Freedom Association in 1843. Her activities as a member were recorded in The Liberator, an abolitionist newspaper based in Boston and published by William Lloyd Garrison. Isabella Holmes also joined a committee to obtain petitions at the Meeting of Colored Citizens of Boston in 1843 alongside Eunice Davis; William Cooper Nell was named secretary at the same meeting.

== Legacy ==
Her home, the Holmes Alley House, is featured as a Boston African American National Historic Site as a Site of the Underground Railroad in Boston’s historic Beacon Hill neighborhood. In 2023, she was recognized as one of "Boston’s most admired, beloved, and successful Black Women leaders" by the Black Women Lead project.
