= Harriet Bell Hayden =

African-American antislavery activist (1816–1893)

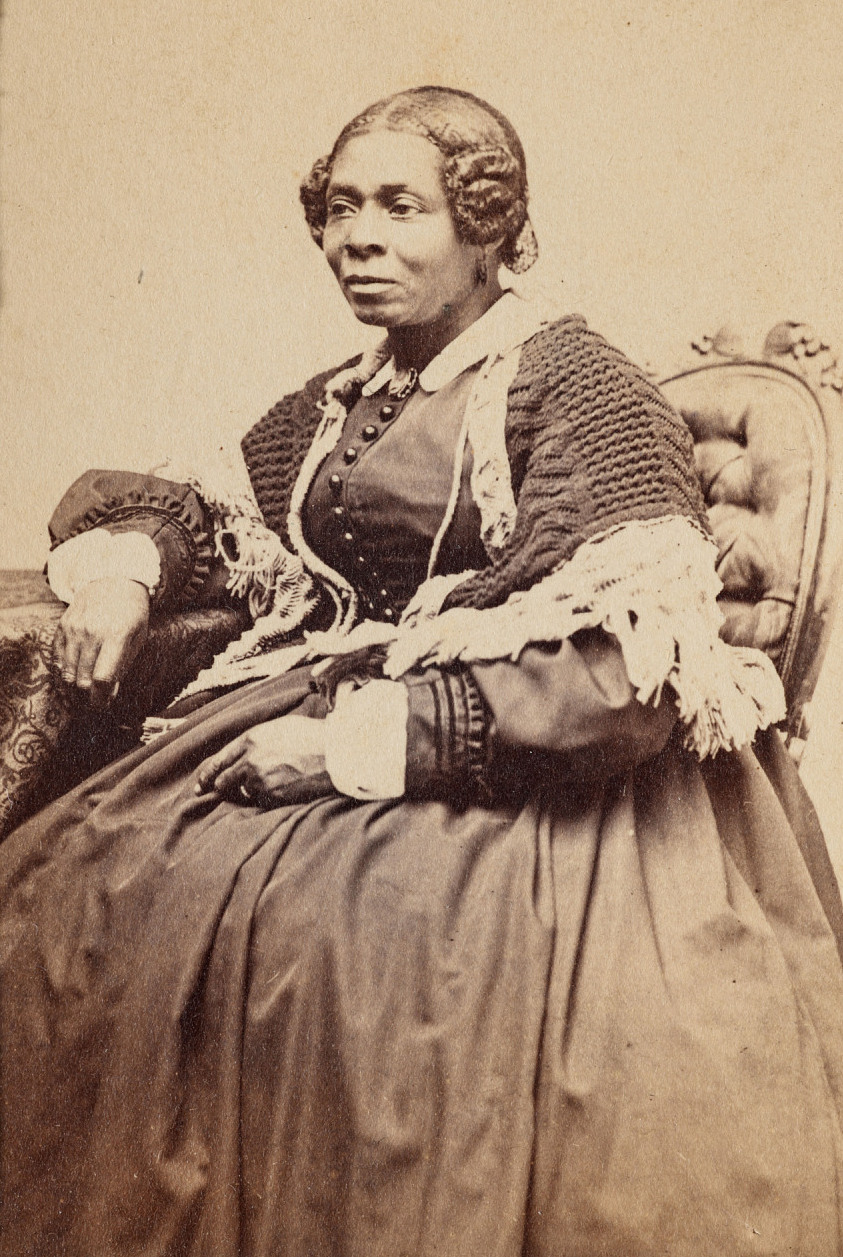
Harriet Bell Hayden

Harriet Bell Hayden (c. 1816–1893) was an African-American antislavery activist in Boston, Massachusetts. She and her husband, Lewis Hayden, escaped slavery in Kentucky and became the primary operators of the Underground Railroad in Boston. They aided the John Brown slave revolt conspiracy, and she played a leadership role in Boston's Black community in the decades following the U.S. Civil War.

== Early life ==
Harriet Bell was born into slavery in Kentucky in about 1816. She had a son named Joseph who was born about 1839. Working in Lexington for her owner, Patterson Bain, as a housekeeper and children's nurse, she met Lewis Hayden, also enslaved, who was working in a hotel there. His wife and son had been sold away to another owner. (Note: Lewis' wife Esther Harvey and their son had been sold to US Senator Henry Clay, who in turn sold them.) They married in 1842. On September 28, 1844, after careful planning, the Haydens and Joseph escaped from Kentucky, travelling via Ohio and Michigan to Canada. Reverend Calvin Fairbank and Delia Webster were instrumental in the first stage of their escape. Both were arrested upon returning to Kentucky. He was given a 15-year sentence for aiding the Haydens. She was sentenced to two years and pardoned after two months. By 1846, the Haydens had permanently relocated with Joseph and their daughter Elizabeth, born in Boston in 1845, and were renting a house at 66 Southac Street (now Phillips Street) in the Beacon Hill neighborhood of Boston, Massachusetts. Lewis ran a clothing store that became the second-largest Black-owned business in Boston. Elizabeth apparently died in the 1850s, recorded in the 1850 census at the age of five and unmentioned in the 1860 census.

== Underground Railroad activism ==
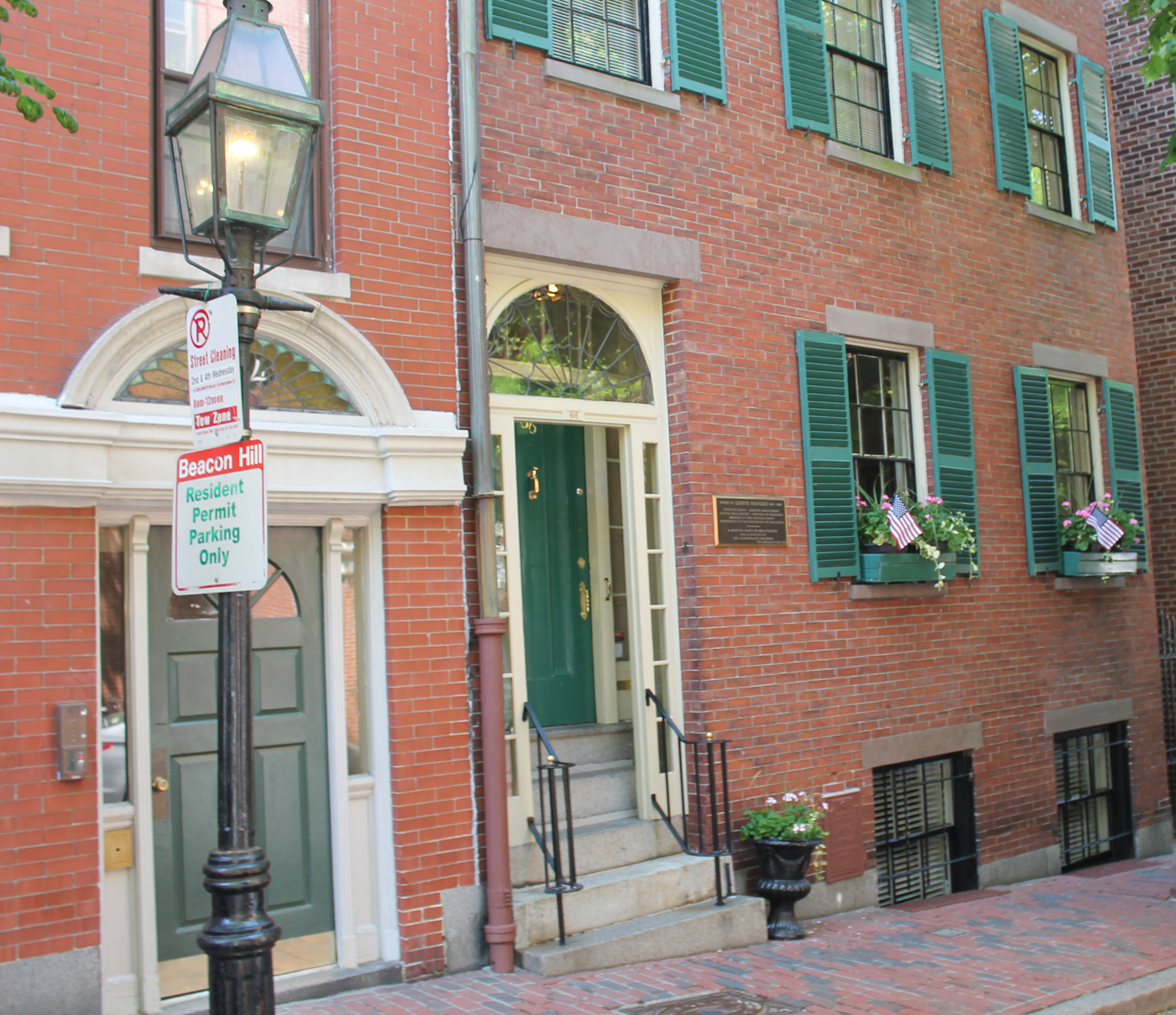
The Haydens' house at 66 Phillips Street

Upon settling in Boston, Harriet and Lewis began putting significant financial resources into helping blacks escape the South and move North. At their home, Harriet opened a boardinghouse where she housed and protected escaped African Americans. The Hayden household "harbored 75 percent of all slaves passing through Boston", hundreds of fugitives. Following the passage of the Fugitive Slave Act in 1850, she managed Boston's main Underground Railroad operations and was key to leading people through Boston's tunnel system. Harriet and her husband were praised by fellow abolitionists Frederick Douglass and William Lloyd Garrison for their efforts in aiding escaped blacks. Among the most notable they assisted were William and Ellen Craft, who became well-known abolitionists. In 1853 when Harriet Beecher Stowe was gathering material for her documentary work A Key to Uncle Tom's Cabin, she was brought to the Haydens' house and saw 13 fugitive former slaves being sheltered there. Others they hosted included Frederick Douglass and Calvin Fairbank, who had helped them escape from Kentucky years earlier.

Between 1857 and 1859 John Brown stayed with the Haydens and disclosed his plans to raid Harper's Ferry, Virginia. Harriet and her husband helped to raise money in support of Brown's raid. Her obituary in Woman's Journal, a Boston women's rights weekly, said "no woman perhaps knew more than she of the inside history of the Harper's Ferry tragedy".

== Later years ==
Her son Joseph served in the United States Navy from November 1861 until his death from disease in Alabama in June 1865 at the age of 26.

During the Civil War, Hayden took classes in reading and writing offered by a white abolitionist. In 1865, after years of renting the Haydens purchased the Haydens' house from the estate of Francis Jackson, an abolitionist who had purchased the building in 1853 to prevent any other landlord from interfering with his tenants anti-slavery work. Years later, as Lewis Hayden's health was failing, friends organized by their ally the abolitionist doctor Henry Bowditch raised enough money to pay off the Haydens' mortgage and provide additional support for Harriet.

Following the war the Haydens supported the temperance movement and Boston's West End Woman Suffrage League. In 1875, Harriet Hayden was one of the founders of the Prince Hall Auxiliary Association, the women's arm of the local Black Masonic organization, the Prince Hall Masons, which supported sites for both the men's and women's groups. In 1876, to mark the centennial of the American Revolution, she organized a celebration for Boston's Black community. She took on another role after Lewis Hayden died in 1889, taking issue in public with how some of his associates, including George T. Downing, had arranged for his burial.

Harriet Hayden died of pneumonia in her Boston home at the age of 74 in 1893. She is buried in Woodlawn Cemetery in Everett, Massachusetts. An obituary paid her tribute:

Her bright, cheerful spirit and quaint, original utterances were an unfailing source of comfort and cheer in the darkest hours of the struggle. No history of that time will be complete without the name of Harriet Hayden and the record of the vigorous part she played."

== Legacy ==
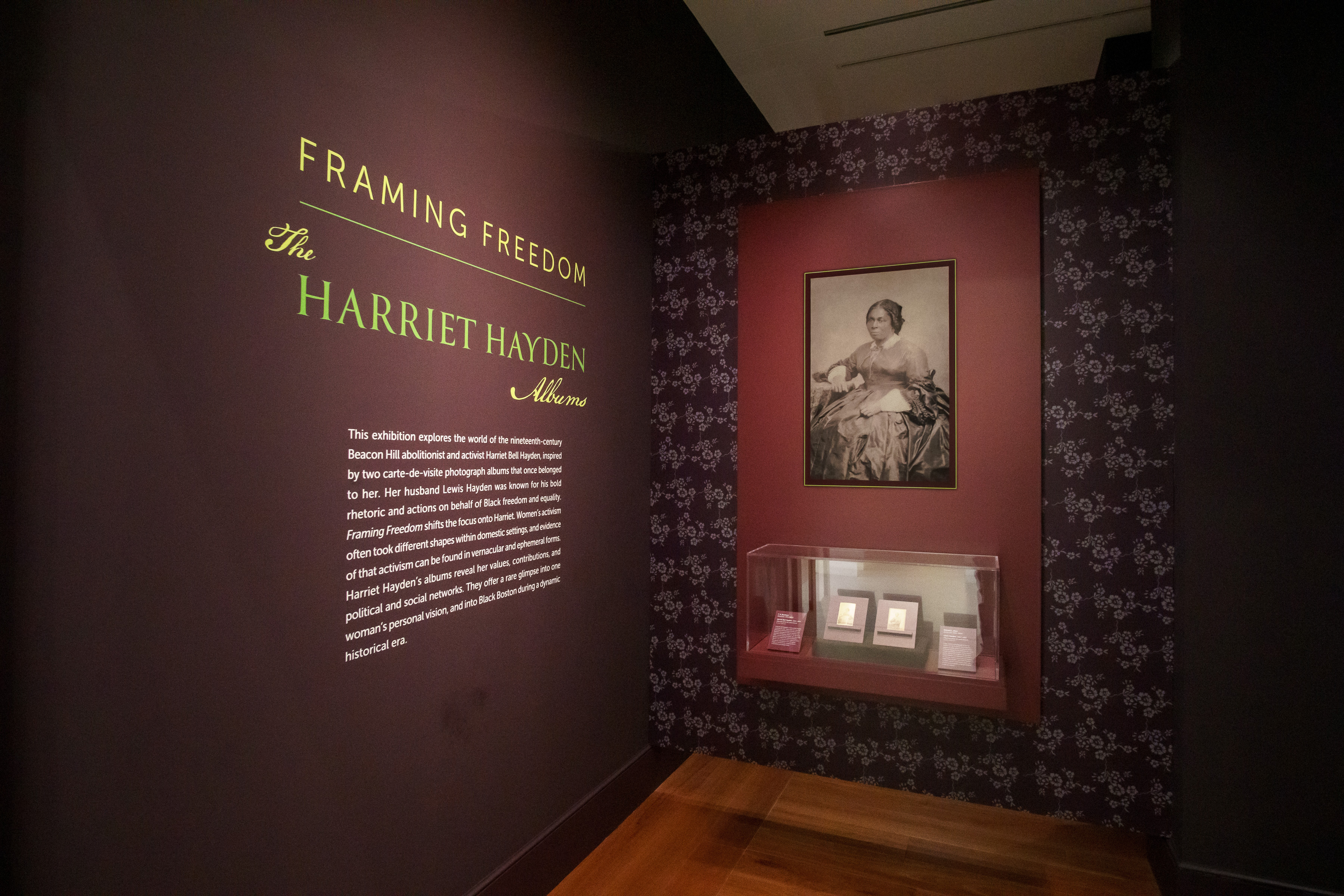
Harriet Hayden Albums exhibition at the Boston Athenaeum, 2024

Upon her death, the entirety of her estate, which amounted to around $5,000 ($179,167 in 2025), was donated to endow a scholarship at Harvard University. The scholarship was to be used to provide financial assistance to Black medical students at the Harvard University Medical School. The Haydens were likely inspired by their many abolitionist connections at Harvard, particularly Henry Bowditch, an abolitionist and professor of medicine there. The scholarship is still awarded today.

Her home at 66 Philips Street is a national historic site and a stopping point along the Black Heritage Trail, a route that goes through the Beacon Hill neighborhood and has many stops at notable African American Heritage sites. Her home, however, is still occupied as a private residence and is not open to the public. A plaque placed on the building by The Heritage Guild mentions Lewis but not Harriet Hayden.

An exhibition at the Boston Athenæum in the spring of 2024 examined two photograph albums that belonged to Harriet Hayden, as a means to document her social relationships and the social networks of her day.

== See also ==
- Lewis and Harriet Hayden House
- Lewis Hayden
