= Boston African American National Historic Site =

National Historic Site of the United States

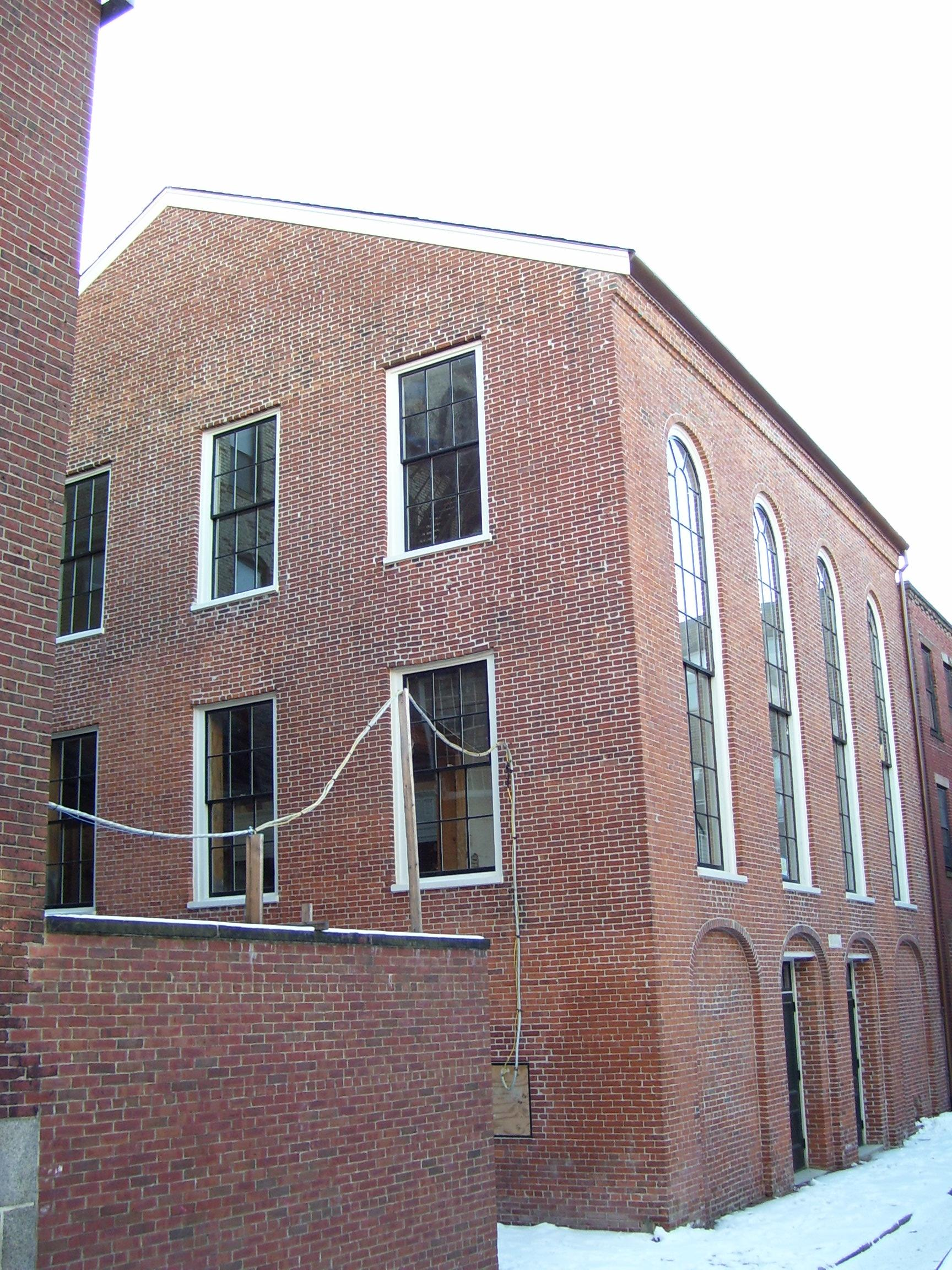
- The African Meeting House in Boston, built by African Americans in 1806

- Location within Boston Location within Massachusetts Location within the United States
- Location: Boston, Massachusetts, United States
- Nearest city: Boston, Massachusetts
- Coordinates: 42°21′36″N 71°03′53″W
- Area: 0.18 acres (0.073 ha)
- Established: October 10, 1980
- Visitors: 365,864 (in 2025)
- Governing body: National Park Service
- Website: Boston African American National Historic Site
- Boston African American National Historic Site
- U.S. National Register of Historic Places
- U.S. National Historic Site
- U.S. Historic district
- Location: Museum of Afro American History, Dudley Station, Box 5, Boston, Massachusetts
- Area: 1 acre (0.40 ha)
- NRHP reference No.: 80004396
- Added to NRHP: October 10, 1980

The Boston African American National Historic Site is in the Beacon Hill neighborhood of Boston, Massachusetts. It includes 15 pre-Civil War structures relating to the history of Boston's 19th-century African-American community, connected by the Black Heritage Trail. Among them are the 1806 African Meeting House, the oldest standing black church in the United States.

== Overview ==
The historical site is located on Beacon Hill, a neighborhood just north of Boston Common. The site was designated in 1980 to "preserve and commemorate original buildings that housed the nineteenth-century free African-American community on Beacon Hill." That year President Jimmy Carter signed bills authorizing this and the Martin Luther King, Jr. National Historic Site, as well as one to establish the National Afro-American Museum and Cultural Center in Wilberforce, Ohio. He said:

The two bills that I will sign today represent a three-pronged effort to preserve a vital, but long neglected, part of American heritage; the history and culture of Americans of African ancestry and their role in the history of our nation.

Boston's first African residents arrived as slaves in 1638 with early colonists. Over time, more of their descendants were born free to white mothers; in other cases slaveholders freed slaves for service. After the American Revolutionary War, Massachusetts effectively abolished slavery by the terms of its new constitution. By the 1790 census, no slaves were recorded in Massachusetts. Subsequently, a sizable community of free Blacks and escaped slaves developed in Boston, settling on the north face of Beacon Hill, and in the North End. With a strong abolitionist community, Boston was long considered a desirable destination for southern Black slaves escaping slavery via the Underground Railroad. African Americans became activists in the abolition movement, also working to gain racial equality and educational parity with whites. They engaged in political processes to meet their objectives.

Before the Civil War, more than half of the 2,000 African Americans in Boston lived on the north slope of Beacon Hill; blacks also lived in the West End north of Cambridge Street, and in the North End. These areas gradually were occupied by new groups of immigrants after African Americans moved to southern areas of Boston. (The North End became a center of Italian immigrants in the late 19th and early 20th centuries.)

The historic site is one of 39 African-American Heritage Sites of the National Park Service.

== Black Heritage Trail ==
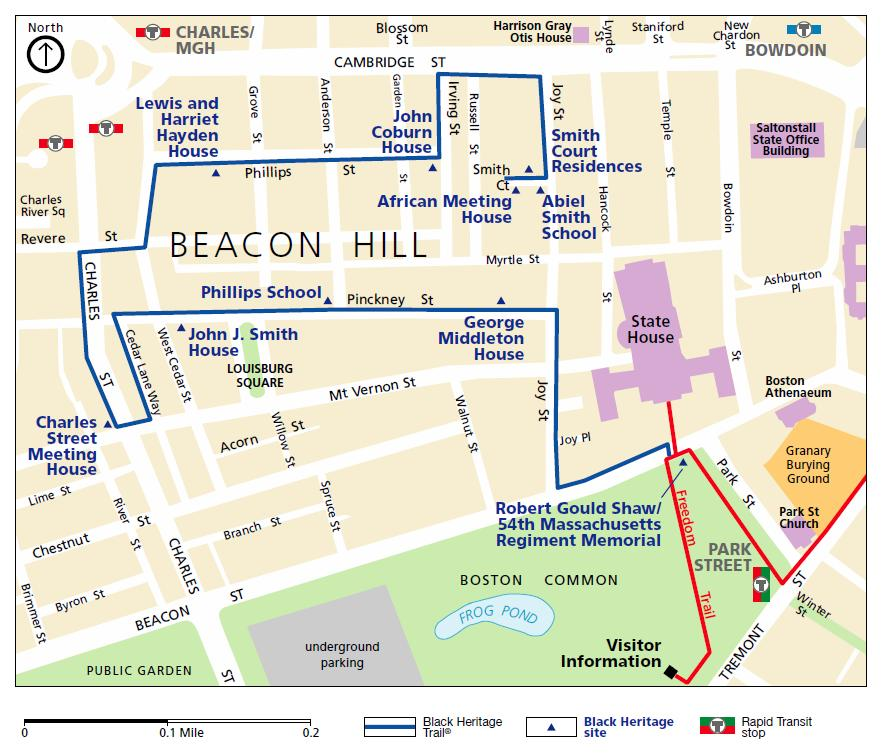
Black Heritage Trail

The National Park Service wrote:

The historic buildings along today's Black Heritage Trail^{®} were the homes, businesses, schools and churches of a thriving black community that organized, from the nation's earliest years, to sustain those who faced local discrimination and national slavery, struggling toward the equality and freedom promised in America's documents of national liberty.

Historical sites along the 1.6 mile (2.5 km) Black Heritage Trail in Beacon Hill include:

- Robert Gould Shaw / 54th Massachusetts Volunteer Regiment Memorial – commemorates the first African-American regiment of the United States Colored Troops during the Civil War and the officer who led the 54th Regiment until his death at the Battle of Fort Wagner in SC. This monument depicts their farewell march down Beacon Street, which was erected at the edge of Boston Common, across Beacon Street from the Massachusetts State House. Poet Robert Lowell won a Pulitzer Prize in the 20th century for his poem, "For the Union Dead," about this monument and soldiers. The regiment's heroic battle at Fort Wagner was the subject of the film Glory (1989).
- African Meeting House – built in 1806, the oldest standing African-American church in the country is operated as part of the Museum of African American History. Displays include speeches from well-informed orators. Built in 1806, the meeting house is the oldest surviving African-American church building in the United States; it became known as the Black Faneuil Hall during the abolitionist movement. Here Frederick Douglass gave many speeches, including his impassioned call for blacks to take up arms against the South in the American Civil War.
- Abiel Smith School – built in 1834, now adapted and operated as the Museum of African American History
- Charles Street Meeting House – built in 1807, the church had segregated seating. In the 1830s some of the members formed the First Baptist Free Church, which became Tremont Temple. It was considered to be one of the first integrated churches in America.
- John Coburn House – home of John Coburn, an African-American abolitionist, soldier and recruiter, who aided people on the Underground Railroad.
- Lewis and Harriet Hayden House – Lewis Hayden was an escaped slave, abolitionist leader, recruiter for the 54th regiment during the Civil War. Afterward, he became a Grand Master of the Prince Hall Masons and was elected as a member of the Massachusetts House of Representatives. Active with the Underground Railroad, Hayden protected escaped slaves in his home, including Ellen and William Craft.
- George Middleton House – One of the oldest standing homes in Beacon Hill. Middleton led the black militia, Bucks of America, during the Revolutionary War. He helped found the Free African Society and served as Grand Master of the Prince Hall African Masonic Lodge.
- Phillips School – one of Boston's first integrated schools
- Smith Court Residences – The five Smith Court homes typify those of black Bostonians in the 1800s. Two notable residents of 3 Smith Court are William Cooper Nell and James Scott, both involved in the abolitionist cause. Nell was an author and considered one of the nation's first black historians.
- John J. Smith House – Smith was an abolitionist leader who helped fugitive slaves on the Underground Railroad. He recruited for the all-black 5th Cavalry during the Civil War. Afterward he was elected as a three-term member of the Massachusetts House of Representatives. Smith lived in this house from 1878–1893.

Most sites on the trail are still used as residences and are not open to the public, except the African Meeting House, Abiel Smith School, and the 54th Regiment Memorial.

Park rangers provide free, two-hour guided tours of the trail during the summer; off-season tours are available by reservation. A self-guided trail map and information is available online, at the Boston African American Historic Site, the Boston National Historic Site center, and at the Abiel Smith School.

== Educational programs ==
Staff collaborated on the Freedom Rising: The 150th anniversary of the Emancipation Proclamation and African Military Service in the Civil War on May 2–4, 2013. The multi-day and multi-location program in Boston included historian Henry Louis Gates and actor Danny Glover, with exhibits at Harvard University and the Museum of African American History.

== Black Boston highlights (1638–1909) ==
Black Boston Highlights (1638–1909)
Year	Image	Event
1638		First enslaved Africans brought to Boston aboard the slave ship Desire.
1641		Massachusetts enacted Body of Liberties defining legal slavery in the colony.
1770		In 1770, Crispus Attucks, an escaped slave, was the first colonist killed in Boston Massacre. He was a national symbol of black men, like the black Revolutionary War soldiers, who helped bring a free nation into being.
1783		Slavery abolished in 1783 in Massachusetts. Quock Walker, an escaped slave, sued for his liberty in 1783. With his victory, Massachusetts abolished slavery, declaring it incompatible with the state constitution.
1790		When the first federal census was recorded in 1790, Massachusetts was the only state in the Union to record no slaves.
1798		First private black school in Primus Hall's home.
1800		Free black population nears 1,100.
1806		African Meeting House opened as First African Baptist Church. Establishment of the African Baptist Church drew many blacks to hear the church's minister, Thomas Paul. The meeting house hosted a school, community groups, musical performances, and antislavery meetings. .
1808		Hall house school moved to African Meeting House
1826		Massachusetts General Colored Association, a black abolitionist group, founded in African Meeting House. It was one of Black Bostonians' organizations, like the African Society and Prince Hall Masons, that publicly opposed racial discrimination and slavery over the next decades. Prince Hall denounced the ill treatment of blacks in Boston, Maria Stewart called black men to greater exertions on behalf of their race, William C. Nell spearheaded the successful movement for school integration, Lewis Hayden defied southern slave catchers, and Frederick Douglass inspired black men to enlist in the Civil War to end slavery.
1829		David Walker published The Appeal, an essay urging slaves to fight for their freedom.
1831		William Lloyd Garrison began publishing The Liberator (anti-slavery newspaper), promoting interracial anti-slavery alliances and the protection of fugitive slaves on the Underground Railroad.
1832		Garrison formed the New England Anti-Slavery Society at the African Meeting House.
1835	The Abiel Smith School, the first dedicated for black children, opens	
1849–1850		Benjamin F. Roberts, on behalf of his daughter, Sarah Roberts, unsuccessfully challenged segregation in Boston public schools.
1850		The Fugitive Slave Act required states (even free ones) enforce the return of fugitive slaves to their owners. Antislavery protests followed passage of this law, and black and white Bostonians joined in direct actions to protect and some times rescue fugitives seeking shelter in the city. The slavery trial of Anthony Burns in Boston galvanized Northern opposition to the Fugitive Slave Law. After the trial, U.S. marshals and a company of marines were required to escort Burns to a ship to take him back to Virginia and slavery. See also Shadrach Minkins.
1855		Boston integrated public schools; Abiel Smith School closed.
1861		Civil War started.
1863		Emancipation Proclamation signed. Responding to pressure from black and white abolitionists and the need to bolster the Union forces, President Lincoln admitted African-American soldiers to the Union forces. 54th Regiment Massachusetts Volunteer Infantry formed, the first all-black regiment raised in the North. Black Bostonians formed the core of the 54th Massachusetts Regiment. On July 18, 1863, the 54th regiment led an assault on Fort Wagner in an attempt to capture Confederate-held Charleston, S.C. In this hard-fought battle, Col. Robert Gould Shaw and many of his soldiers were killed. Sgt. William Carney of New Bedford was wounded while saving the flag from capture.
1865		Civil War ended; 13th Amendment abolished slavery. After the Civil War, many freed African Americans moved north. Boston's black population increased from fewer than 2,500 in 1860 to nearly 12,000 by 1900. Most newcomers came from the Southeast. During Reconstruction, some were relocated by the Freedmen's Bureau for training and employment as domestic servants. The newcomers expanded black residential areas, settling in Boston's South End and Roxbury. Gradually long-time black residents of Beacon Hill moved their businesses and homes to that area.
1897		Robert Gould Shaw Memorial honoring 54th Massachusetts Regiment was dedicated in Boston Common.
1898		The Black congregation of the African Meeting House moved to Roxbury; the meeting house became a Jewish synagogue, representing new immigrants. By 1930 the South End and Roxbury were home to most of Boston's 21,000 African Americans.
1900		Sgt. William H. Carney, veteran of the 54th Massachusetts Regiment, received Medal of Honor for rescuing the flag during Battle of Fort Wagner, S.C. in 1863. He was the nation's first black Medal of Honor recipient.
1901		William Monroe Trotter (a descendant of Elizabeth Hemings, a slave of Thomas Jefferson) founded the African-American newspaper, The Boston Guardian.
1909		National Association for the Advancement of Colored People (NAACP) founded, attracting many black and white Bostonians.

== 19th century population ==
African American population in 19th century Boston
Year	Number	Percent of population
1820	1,690	3.90
1830	1,875	3.05
1840	2,427	2.60
1850	1,999	1.46
1860	2,261	1.27
1870	3,496	1.40
1880	5,873	1.62
1890	8,125	1.81

While the black population increased markedly during this period, extensive immigration from Europe overshadowed that growth, with new immigrants from Ireland, Italy, the Russian and Austro-Hungarian empires, and other parts of eastern and southern Europe.

== See also ==
- National Register of Historic Places listings in northern Boston
