= John J. Smith House =

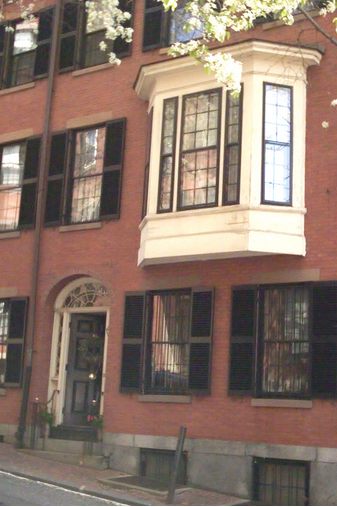

- Location within Boston

General information
- Location: Beacon Hill, Private residence: 86 Pinckney Street, Boston, United States
- Coordinates: 42.3587085°N 71.0694957°W

John J. Smith House was the home of John J. Smith from 1878 to 1893. Smith was an African American abolitionist, Underground Railroad contributor and politician, including three terms as a member of the Massachusetts House of Representatives. He also played a key role in rescuing Shadrach Minkins (a then slave) from federal custody, along with Lewis Hayden and others.

== John J. Smith ==
Born free in Richmond, Virginia, John J. Smith (1820–1906) moved to Boston in the late 1840s. Smith was an African American abolitionist leader who helped people escape slavery on the Underground Railroad. He was also a recruiting officer for the all-black 5th Cavalry during the Civil War and then a three-term member of the Massachusetts House of Representatives.

In the early 1870s, his daughter Elizabeth Smith started teaching at the Phillips School and was probably the first African American to teach in an integrated Boston public school.

== Black Heritage Trail ==
The house is a Boston African American historical site located on the Black Heritage Trail in Beacon Hill.
