= Desegregation of the Baltimore City Public Schools =

Desegregation of the Baltimore City Public Schools took place in 1956 after the United States Supreme Court ruled, in the case of Brown v. Board of Education, that segregation in schools went against constitutional law. Desegregation of U.S. schools was part of the civil rights movement. The events that followed desegregation in Baltimore, were important to the civil rights movement across America. Recent scholarship has identified Baltimore's desegregation as an important precursor to the Greensboro sit-ins.

== Desegregation efforts ==
Most Baltimore City public schools were not integrated until after the Supreme Court decision in Brown v. Board of Education. However, in 1952, Baltimore Polytechnic Institute was forced to open its advanced college preparatory curriculum to African American students. This course was prestigious and was unusual for a high school at that time. The institute's "A" course included calculus, analytical chemistry, electricity, mechanics and surveying; subjects not offered at the black schools in the City at that time. The institute was a whites-only school, but supported by both white and black tax dollars. Consequently, a group of 16 African American students, along with help and support from their parents, the Baltimore Urban League and the National Association for the Advancement of Colored People (NAACP), applied for the engineering "A" course at the institute. The applications were denied and the students sued.

The subsequent trial began on June 16, 1952. The NAACP's intentions were to end segregation at the 50-year-old public high school. They argued that the institute's offerings of specialized engineering courses violated the "separate but equal" clause because these courses was not offered in high schools for black students. To avoid integration, an out-of-court proposal was made to the Baltimore City school board to start an equivalent "A" course at the colored Frederick Douglass High School. The hearing on the "Douglass" plan lasted for hours with WILMER DEHUFF PRINCIPAL OF BALTIMORE POLY and others arguing that separate but equal "A" courses would satisfy constitutional requirements, and NAACP attorney Thurgood Marshall arguing that the plan was a gamble and a cost the city should not take. By a vote of 5–3, the board decided that a separate "A" course would not provide the same educational opportunities for African American students and that starting that fall, African American students could attend the institute. The vote vindicated the NAACP national strategy of raising the cost of 'separate but equal' schools beyond what taxpayers were willing to pay.

== Desegregation after Brown v Board of Education ==
The African American community in Baltimore grew rapidly after desegregation and, as a result, the schools became over-crowded. Because of this, Baltimore decided to district the schools. This meant that if someone did not live in the district of a certain school, they could not attend that school. This was a way for the school system to remain segregated. African Americans and whites still lived in different areas of Baltimore, therefore, African American and white children went to different schools.

The Maryland State Department of Education put out a book on the progress of desegregation in 1961. The book has an overall feeling that all is fixed, and that nothing more needs to be done to further the cause of desegregation. This was obviously inaccurate, and displays the hardships that the civil rights movement encountered.

The Baltimore school system was accused of intentionally segregating schools through districting. (Crain 1968, 74) Many civil rights leaders protested this, and asked for reform in the system. The reform was slow, and is still being sought after today.

By 1968, the tensions between the African American and white citizens in Baltimore were high, and came to a head when Dr. Martin Luther King Jr. was assassinated in April 1968. Riots broke out in Baltimore during the weekend of Palm Sunday. African American citizens were frustrated and angry. The 1968 riots were not exclusive to Baltimore. Many American cities had riots after Dr. Martin Luther King Jr. was assassinated.

The educational achievement of African American students in Baltimore would continue to lag behind that of their white counterparts, with a report in 1968 showing that the ethnic mix of areas, the influence of private education and the divide between urban and suburban areas affected outcomes.
