= Paul Kendrick =

American historian

Paul Kendrick (born 1983) is an American author of popular history, political organizer, and Democratic candidate for Illinois State Legislature.

== Early life and education ==
Kendrick obtained a bachelor's and a master's degree from the Columbian College of Arts and Sciences at George Washington University (GW).

During his time at GW, Kendrick served as President of the college's National Association for the Advancement of Colored People chapter and also as a Presidential Administrative Fellow.

== Professional career ==
Kendrick’s professional career has included work in education, public policy, and political organizing. Early in his career, he worked in college access and student success initiatives including for the Harlem Children's Zone's College Success Program.

Following work on the 2012 Obama presidential campaign, Kendrick served as a special assistant to Secretary Arne Duncan at the United States Department of Education, and later re-joined the Obama Administration in the Office of Presidential Personnel.

Following his work in the Obama Administration, Kendrick worked on the gubernatorial campaign of JB Pritzker and then became executive director of Rust Belt Rising, an organization focused on training Democratic candidates in the Midwest and voter turnout. During his tenure, the organization reported registering more than 130,000 voters.

Kendrick later served as Director of Program Strategy at Hope Chicago, an education nonprofit supporting college access and student success for students from Chicago’s South and West Side communities.

He is an adjunct professor at National Louis University, teaching first-generation college students.

== Local elected and civic roles ==
Kendrick has held elected local education governance positions in Chicago. He served as a community representative on the Lincoln Park High School Local School Council and previously served on the Alcott Elementary School Local School Council.

He has also served on the board of the Park West Neighbors Association, a Chicago neighborhood organization focused on local civic engagement and quality-of-life issues.

== Illinois House of Representatives campaign ==
In 2025, Kendrick announced his candidacy for the Illinois House of Representatives from the 12th District as a Democrat, seeking election in 2026. His campaign platform emphasizes public education funding, affordability, labor rights, and environmental policy. He has been endorsed by the outgoing 12th District representative, Margaret Croke, who is currently running for Illinois comptroller.

== Writing and historical work ==
With his father, Stephen Kendrick, Kendrick has co-authored three works of popular history. The first, Sarah's Long Walk: The Free Blacks of Boston and How Their Struggle for Equality Changed America, describes the legal case, Roberts v. Boston, brought on behalf of Sarah Roberts, a black child who was not allowed to attend any of the five "whites-only" schools she passed on her daily walks to school, and the effect this had on the effort to desegregate Boston schools in the 1840s. The case led to the Separate but equal justification for segregation. The book was named among the best non-fiction of 2005 by the Christian Science Monitor.

The duo's next book, Douglass and Lincoln: How a Revolutionary Black Leader and a Reluctant Liberator Struggled to End Slavery and Save the Union, concentrated on the meetings of President Lincoln and Frederick Douglass between 1863 and 1865, and how their conversations impacted the outcome of the Civil War.

Their third book, Nine Days: The Race to Save Martin Luther King Jr.'s Life and Win the 1960 Election, is about Martin Luther King, Jr.'s imprisonment in the days leading up to the 1960 presidential election.

== Personal and family life ==
Kendrick resides in Chicago with his wife, Kori Schulman, and their two daughters.

== Publications ==
- Sarah's Long Walk: The Free Blacks of Boston and How Their Struggle for Equality Changed America by Paul Kendrick & Stephen Kendrick. Beacon Press: Boston (2004). ISBN 978-0-8070-5018-7
- Douglass and Lincoln: How a Revolutionary Black Leader and a Reluctant Liberator Struggled to End Slavery and Save the Union by Paul Kendrick & Stephen Kendrick. Walker & Company: New York (2007). ISBN 978-0-8027-1523-4
- Nine Days: The Race to Save Martin Luther King Jr.'s Life and Win the 1960 Election by Paul Kendrick & Stephen Kendrick. Farrar, Straus and Giroux: New York (2021). ISBN 9781250155702
