= Phillips School =

School in Massachusetts, US

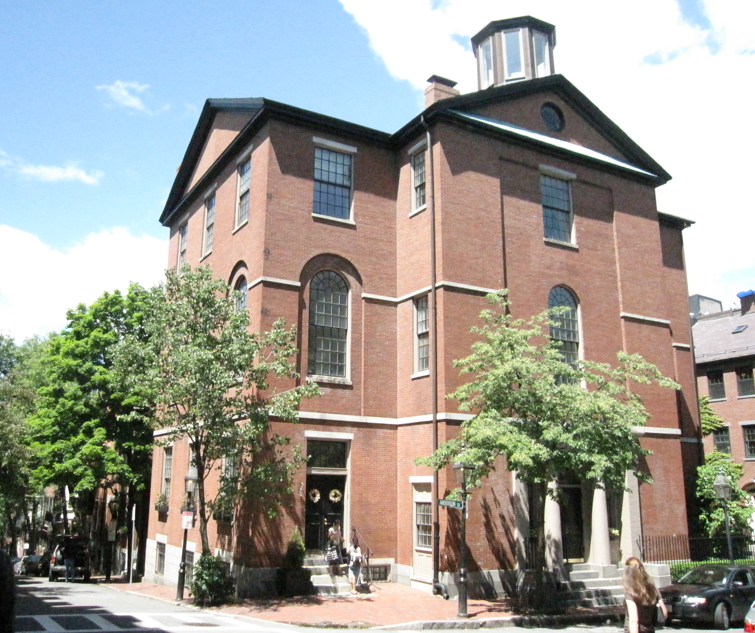

- Location within Boston

General information
- Location: Beacon Hill, Private Residence: Pinckney and Anderson, Boston, United States
- Coordinates: 42.358974°N 71.067835°W

The Phillips School was a 19th-century school located in Beacon Hill, Boston, Massachusetts. It is now a private residence. It is on the Black Heritage Trail and its history is included in walking tours by the Boston African American National Historic Site. Built in 1824, it was a school for white children. After Massachusetts law from 1855 required school desegregation, Phillips was one of the first integrated schools in Boston.

== History ==
=== English High School ===
The school was first the English High School, built between 1823 and 1825. Its architecture is typical of other 19th century schools in Boston.

=== Phillips Grammar School ===
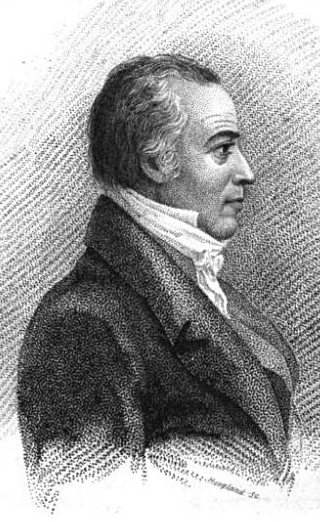
Portrait of Phillips, from Boston Monthly Magazine, 1825

In 1844, it was converted to a grammar school and was named the Phillips Grammar School after John Phillips, the first mayor of Boston and father of Wendell Phillips, a noted abolitionist.

The school educated nearby children, predominantly from wealthy families. In contrast to the Abiel Smith School, which was the public school for African American children from 1835 to 1855, the Phillips School was considered one of the best schools in the city.

Black Bostonians fought tirelessly for equal educational opportunities throughout the 19th century. Benjamin tried unsuccessfully in 1847 to have his daughter enrolled in a white school near his home, and then at Phillips School. When Boston schools were finally integrated in 1855, by an act of the Massachusetts legislature, the Phillips School became one of the first integrated schools in Boston.

=== Wendell Phillips School ===
In 1863, (Note: The Museum of African History states that the school was moved in 1861.) the Phillips School moved to a new building on Phillips Street (formerly Southac Street). It was renamed the Wendall Phillips School for the abolitionists Wendell Phillips, son of the original namesake, John Phillips. In the early 1870s, Elizabeth Smith, daughter of abolitionist John J. Smith, started teaching at the Phillips School and was probably the first African American to teach in an integrated Boston public school. The school was closed in 1940 and the building was converted into a technical school. The building was sold for housing in 1977.

== Black Heritage Trail ==
The house is a Boston African American historical site located on the Black Heritage Trail in Beacon Hill.

== Gallery ==
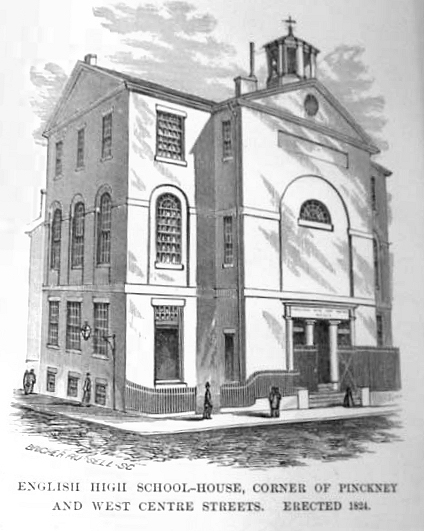
Engraving of the second home of The English High School, 1824. The first building in North America built specifically for a high school. Later renamed Phillips School. Semi-Centennial History of The English High School. Boston. May 2, 1871.

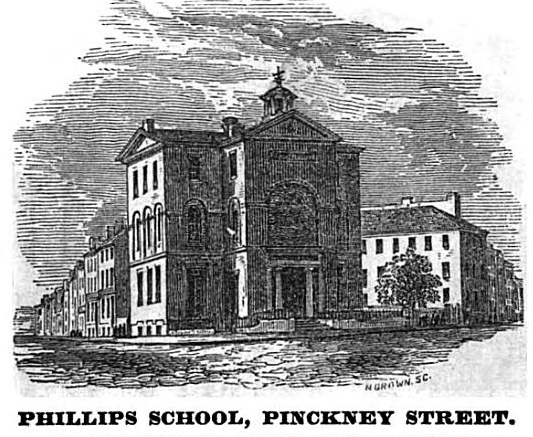
Phillips School, Homans, Sketches of Boston, Past and Present. 1851.
