= Samuel Snowden =

African American clergyman and abolitionist

- Born: c. 1765
- Died: 1850
- Occupations: pastor, abolitionist

Samuel Snowden (c. 1765—1850) was an African-American abolitionist and pastor of the May Street Church, one of the first black Methodist churches in Boston, Massachusetts. Under Reverend Snowden's direction from 1818 to 1850, the May Street Church congregation supported the Underground Railroad; members included several prominent abolitionists, such as David Walker from North Carolina.

== Pastoral life ==
Snowden was born enslaved in a slave state, but later reached the free states and began his career as a pastor.

Before 1818, Reverend Snowden served as the pastor of the Chestnut Street Church in Portland, Maine. As the African-American community in the Bromfield Street Methodist Episcopal Church in Boston grew, they petitioned their bishop to establish a separate black Methodist church and to appoint Snowden as their pastor. While smaller than the prominent First African Baptist Church in Boston, they had some autonomy.

The bishop accepted their petition, and in 1818, he appointed Snowden as pastor of the newly established May Street Church. With Reverend Snowden at the helm, the May Street Church community grew too large for their facilities, and they built a new church nearby in 1824, the Revere Street Church. Snowden served as pastor until he died in 1850.

== Abolitionist activities ==
While pastor of the May Street and Revere Street churches, Snowden was deeply involved in abolitionism. David Walker, leading abolitionist and author of An Appeal to the Coloured Citizens of the World, was a member of the May Street Church. Snowden's "powerful personality and antislavery activism" is likely what attracted Walker to his church, and the men lived across the street from each other on the north side of Beacon Hill in the late 1820s.

The congregation supported the church as a stop on the Underground Railroad; Snowden and his family also aided people escaping slavery at their homes. Snowden and his daughter, Isabella Holmes, welcomed freedom seekers into their houses and offered them shelter, food, and clothing. Additionally, Snowden worked closely with William Lloyd Garrison, donating money to abolitionism and allowing Garrison to use his church's facilities for events.
