= Benjamin F. Roberts =

African American printer, writer, activist and abolitionist

Benjamin Roberts
- Born: Benjamin F Roberts; September 4, 1815; Boston, Massachusetts
- Died: September 6, 1881 (aged 66)
- Occupations: Printer, publisher, writer, activist
- Spouse: Adeline Fowler

Benjamin Franklin Roberts (September 4, 1815 – September 6, 1881) was an African-American printer, writer, activist and abolitionist in Boston, Massachusetts, whose famous case on behalf of his daughter, Sarah Roberts v. Boston, resulted in a verdict that laid the foundation for "separate but equal", but was also cited in the landmark 1954 case Brown vs. Board of Education. Despite losing his case seeking access to schools near his home for his 5-year-old daughter at the Massachusetts Supreme Court, he was successful in 1855 bringing the issue to the state legislature.

== Early life and ancestry ==
Benjamin F. Roberts was one of the 12 children of Sarah and Robert Roberts. Born in Boston, Massachusetts, he was named after Benjamin Franklin and came from an impressive lineage of activists and writers through both his mother's and father's sides. His father was a servant to Nathaniel Appleton and Christopher Gore, then a stevedore, and wrote The House Servant's Directory in 1827, one of the first books written by an African American to be published. Roberts' grandfather on his mother's side, James Easton, protested segregation with demonstrations at church as early as 1800.

Roberts attended the Good Samaritan School in North Bridgewater as a boy and was very influenced by his grandfather, James, and his uncle, Hosea Easton. Roberts began his working life as a shoemaker's apprentice.

== Writing, printing, and publishing ==
Occasionally, Roberts wrote editorials for the Liberator. Much of his writing argued for recognition of blacks as Americans, specifically in reaction to organizations such as the American Colonization Society that supported the deportation of African Americans. He felt integration and equal education would help combat the belief that blacks did not belong in America.

Roberts married Adeline Fowler in 1838. In April of that year, he established an abolitionist publication that would better represent black writers and their views called Anti-Slavery Herald. Subscription fees helped the paper provide apprenticeships for African Americans to learn the printing trade. No issues of the Anti-Slavery Herald survive, but the paper must have been considered radical since he lost the recommendation and support of Amos Phelps, a prominent white abolitionist.

After the close of the Anti-Slavery Herald, the Roberts family moved to the nearby town of Lynn, Massachusetts, and he continued his printing business. He printed the town's first directory in 1841, and printed other pamphlets, broadsides, and books. Of note is an expanded, one volume edition of the African and Native American author Robert Benjamin Lewis's book, Light and Truth.

== Sarah Roberts v. Boston ==
Robert's most lasting legacy may be his 1848 lawsuit, Sarah Roberts v. Boston, on behalf of his five-year-old daughter. Sarah, who was enrolled in the segregated Abiel Smith School, attempted to attend a white school that was a shorter and safer walk from her home as well as better quality education. The quality of the Smith school was known to be poor and a school boycott was in progress. This was a re-emergence of Roberts's activism after the loss of his first paper.

Lawyer Robert Morris (the second African American lawyer in the country and the first to argue a jury trial) filed the case. When the case reached the Superior Court, Charles Sumner was brought on as co-counsel. Chief Justice Lemuel Shaw of the Massachusetts Supreme Judicial Court ruled against them and upheld racial segregation in schools. In 1896, the case became the foundation for the "separate but equal" standard that resulted from Plessy v. Ferguson.

== Later life ==
In 1853, Roberts again tried publishing a paper titled Self Elevator, but he was not successful.

Roberts died on September 6, 1881, at the age of 66 from epilepsy. He is buried in Middlesex County's Mount Auburn Cemetery, sharing a headstone with his father-in-law, William Fowler.
