= Lewis and Harriet Hayden House =

Historic abolitionists' house in Boston

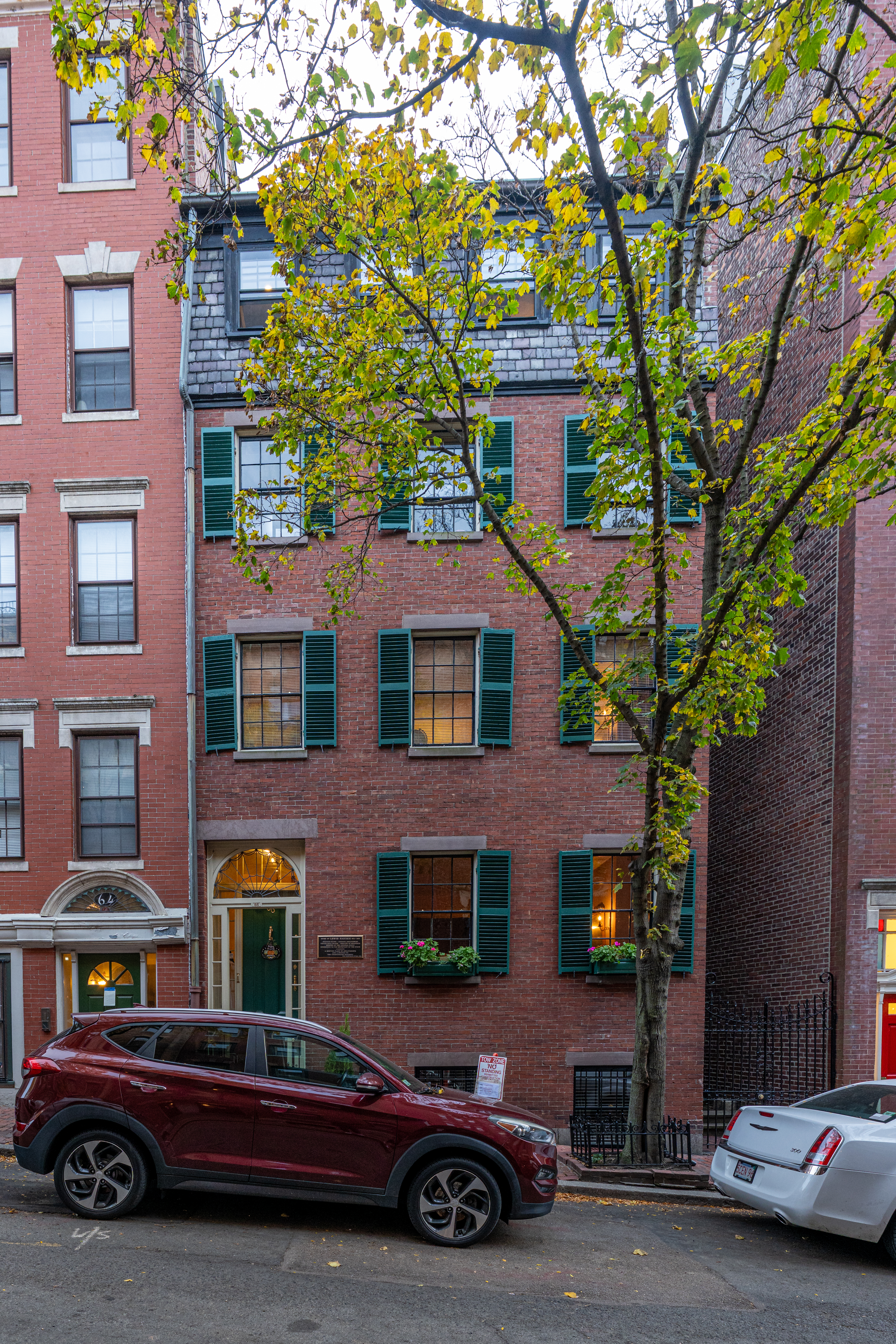
- Lewis and Harriet Hayden House, former home of African American abolitionists.

- Location within Boston

General information
- Location: Beacon Hill, Private residence: 66 Phillips Street, Boston, United States
- Coordinates: 42.360239°N 71.069036°W

Lewis and Harriet Hayden House was the home of African-American abolitionists who had escaped from slavery in Kentucky; it is located in Beacon Hill, Boston. They maintained the home as a stop on the Underground Railroad, and the Haydens were visited by Harriet Beecher Stowe as research for her book, Uncle Tom's Cabin (1852). Lewis Hayden was an important leader in the African-American community of Boston; in addition, he lectured as an abolitionist and was a member of the Boston Vigilance Committee, which resisted the Fugitive Slave Act of 1850.

== Lewis and Harriet Hayden ==
Lewis Hayden was born into slavery in Lexington, Kentucky, in 1812. His first wife and their son were sold to U.S. Senator Henry Clay. They were sold again to the Deep South, and Hayden never saw them again. In 1842 Hayden married Harriet Bell, who already had a son Joseph. In 1844, with the help of abolitionists, they escaped to Ohio and then along the Underground Railroad to Canada. Abolitionist Delia Webster had transported the family of 3 to freedom. She was a school teacher from Vermont who had moved to Kentucky. She was caught when she returned from the journey from Kentucky to the Ohio River crossing to Ohio. She was jailed, tried and sentenced to years in the Kentucky Penitentiary. Somehow, she obtained a pardon from the Governor and was released. Her work continued, and she was jailed several more times. She lies in an unmarked grave.

In 1845, the Haydens returned to the US at Detroit, and by January 1846 they had moved to Boston. Hayden owned and ran a clothing store on Cambridge Street. (Note: The African American Museum stated that Hayden was born in 1816; The National Park Service said he was born in 1812.)

In 1849 or 1850, the Haydens moved into the house at 66 Phillips (then Southac) Street on Beacon Hill. The house was purchased in 1853 by Francis Jackson of the anti-slavery Vigilance Committee. The African American Museum hypothesized that may have been done "to assure that Hayden would not be harassed in his Underground Railroad activities."

The Haydens routinely cared for African Americans who had escaped from slavery, including the noted Ellen and William Craft, and their home served as a boarding house. Hayden prevented slave catchers from taking the Crafts by threatening to blow up his home with gunpowder if they tried to reclaim them. Records from the Boston Vigilance Committee, of which Lewis was a member, indicate that scores of people received aid and safe shelter at the Hayden home between 1850 and 1860.

An author was escorted by an unnamed individual to their home:

When, in 1853, Mrs. Harriet Beecher Stowe came to The Liberator Office, 21 Cornhill, to get facts for her Key to Uncle Tom's Cabin, she was taken by Mr. R.F. Wallcutt and myself over to Lewis Hayden's house in Southnac Street, thirteen newly-escaped slaves of all colors and sizes were brought in into one room for her to see. Though Mrs. Stowe had written wonderful "Uncle Tom" at the request of Dr. Bailey, of Washington, for the National Era, expressly to show up the workings of the Fugitive Slave-Law, yet she had never seen such a company of 'fugitives' together before.

Hayden was one of the men who helped rescue Shadrach Minkins from federal custody in 1851, and he played a significant role in the attempted rescue of Anthony Burns. Hayden also contributed money to John Brown, in preparation for his raid on Harper's Ferry. He was a recruiter for the 54th Regiment. His son served in the Union Navy during the Civil War and was killed. In 1865, Harriet Hayden bought the house from Francis Jackson's estate.

Hayden served a term in the Massachusetts House of Representatives in 1873 and worked for the Massachusetts Secretary of State from 1859 to 1889. Lewis Hayden died on April 7, 1889. Harriet Hayden, upon her death in 1893, bequeathed her estate to provide a scholarship at Harvard Medical School for African American students.

In his book, The Negro in the Civil War, Benjamin Quarles said of the Haydens' house:

It was there that Theodore Parker, of sainted abolitionist memory, had married the fugitive slaves, William and Ellen Craft; it was there that John Brown had lodged during his last trip to Boston. Hayden had been the first to suggest to John A. Andrew that he run for governor; on Thanksgiving Day in 1862 Governor Andrew was to come down from Beacon Hill and have turkey dinner at the Haydens.

The Lewis and Harriet Hayden House is a site along the Black Heritage Trail. It is a private residence. It is also featured on the Boston Women's Heritage Trail.

== Black Heritage Trail ==
The house is a Boston African-American historic site located on the Black Heritage Trail in Beacon Hill.

== See also ==
- List of Underground Railroad sites
