= Roberts v. City of Boston =

1850 Massachusetts court case

- Court: Supreme Court of Massachusetts, Suffolk
- Full case name: Sarah C. Roberts vs. The City of Boston
- Decided: November 1849
- Citation: 59 Mass. 198, 5 Cush. 198

Court membership
- Judge sitting: Lemuel Shaw

Case opinions
- Action dismissed

Roberts v. Boston, 59 Mass. (5 Cush.) 198 (1850), was a court case seeking to end racial discrimination in Boston public schools. The Massachusetts Supreme Judicial Court ruled in favor of Boston, finding no constitutional basis for the suit. The case was later cited by the US Supreme Court in Plessy v. Ferguson, which established the "separate but equal" standard.

The 2004 book, Sarah's Long Walk: The Free Blacks of Boston and How Their Struggle for Equality Changed America, co-authored by Stephen and Paul Kendrick, explores this case, along with its social and political context.

== Overview ==
Roberts v. Boston centered on Sarah C. Roberts, a five-year-old African-American girl. She was enrolled in Abiel Smith School, an underfunded all-black common school, far from her home in Boston, Massachusetts. Her father, Benjamin F. Roberts, also African-American, attempted to enroll her at closer, whites-only schools. After Sarah Roberts was denied on the basis of her race, and was physically removed from one school, her father wrote to the state legislature to seek a solution. Eventually, the Supreme Court of Massachusetts heard the case, in which Benjamin Roberts listed his daughter Sarah as the Plaintiff and the City of Boston as the Defendant.

Not all African-Americans supported Roberts; most believed in "separate but equal" schooling and questioned the kind of education their children would receive from a white teacher. The defendant's attorney was Peleg Chandler, the plaintiff's attorneys were Charles Sumner and Robert Morris (one of the country's first African-American lawyers), and the judge was Lemuel Shaw. Sumner noted the distance that Sarah had to travel and the psychological trauma the girl would experience having to go to an all-black, sub-standard school. Shaw ruled for the defendant.

Roberts brought the issue to the state legislature with Sumner's help and in 1855, the Commonwealth of Massachusetts banned segregated schools in the state. This was the first law prohibiting segregated schools in the United States.

== Legacy ==
- 1896, Case of Plessy v. Ferguson: ruled in favor of "separate but equal" schools for blacks, citing the ruling in Roberts v. Boston
- 1954, Case of Brown v. Board of Education: ruled against "separate but equal", citing Sumner's arguments, and banned segregated schools nationwide.

Implementation of desegregation came almost a decade after the 1965 Racial Imbalance Act, and resulted in the Boston desegregation busing crisis.

== Sources ==
- Finkelman, Paul. "Segregation in the United States." Encarta MSN. 2008. Microsoft Encarta Online Encyclopedia. 11 Feb 2009.
- Douglas, Davison M. Jim Crow Moves North: The Battle over Northern School Segregation, 1865–1954. New York: Cambridge University Press, 2005.
- Volk, Kyle G. (2014). Moral Minorities and the Making of American Democracy. Oxford, UK: Oxford University Press. pp. 116–131. ISBN 019937192X.
- Kelly, Cynthia A. (1977). "A Plea for Equality" in Update, Volume 1, Number 1, Spring 1977. American Bar Association. pp. 12–13.
