= Abiel Smith School =

Coordinates: 42.36001°N 71.06515°W

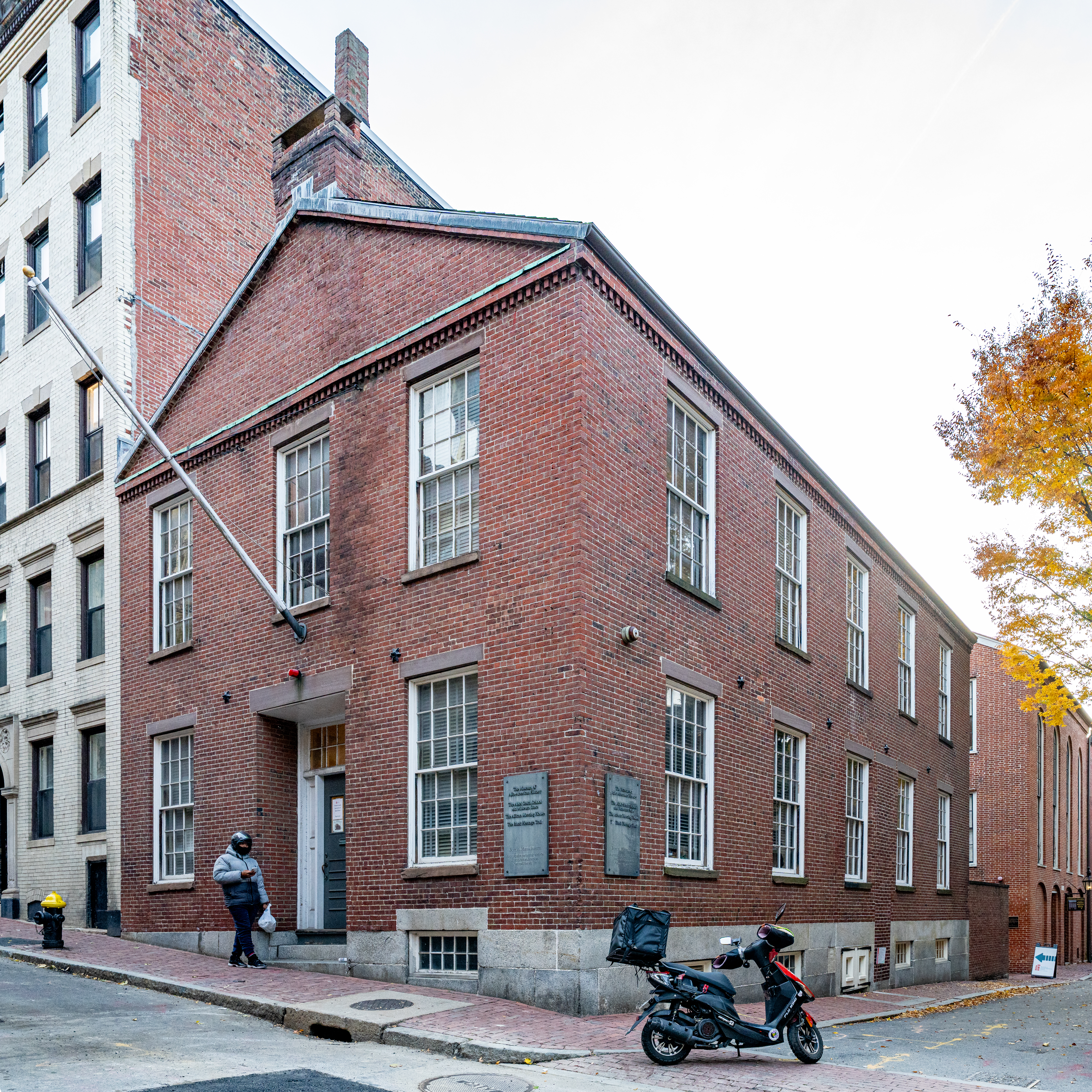
- Abiel Smith School, 2025
- United States

Information
- Established: 1835
- Website: www.nps.gov/boaf/learn/historyculture/abiel-smith-school.htm

Abiel Smith School, founded in 1835, is a school located at 46 Joy Street in Boston, Massachusetts, United States, adjacent to the African Meeting House. It is named for Abiel Smith, a white philanthropist who left money (an estimated $4,000) in his will to the city of Boston for the education of black children.

The city constructed the school building with Smith's funds. Designed by Richard Upjohn as his first public project, this was the first public school for free black people. In 1835, all black children in Boston were assigned to the Smith school, which replaced a basement school in the African Meeting House next door. It is a part of the Beacon Hill Historic District (a National Historic Landmark District), a site on the Boston Black Heritage Trail, and is part of the Boston African American National Historic Site.

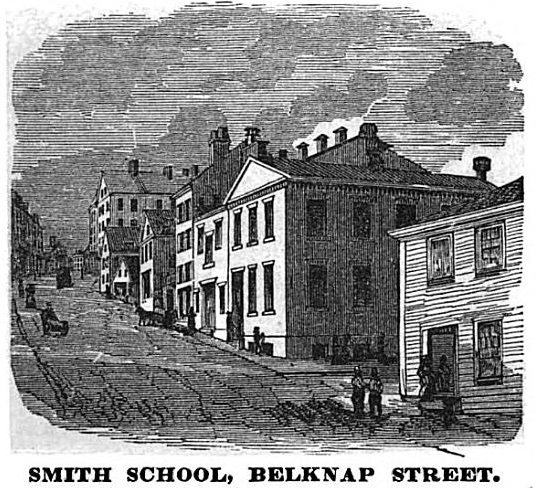
Smith School, Belknap St. (later Joy St.), Boston, ca.1851

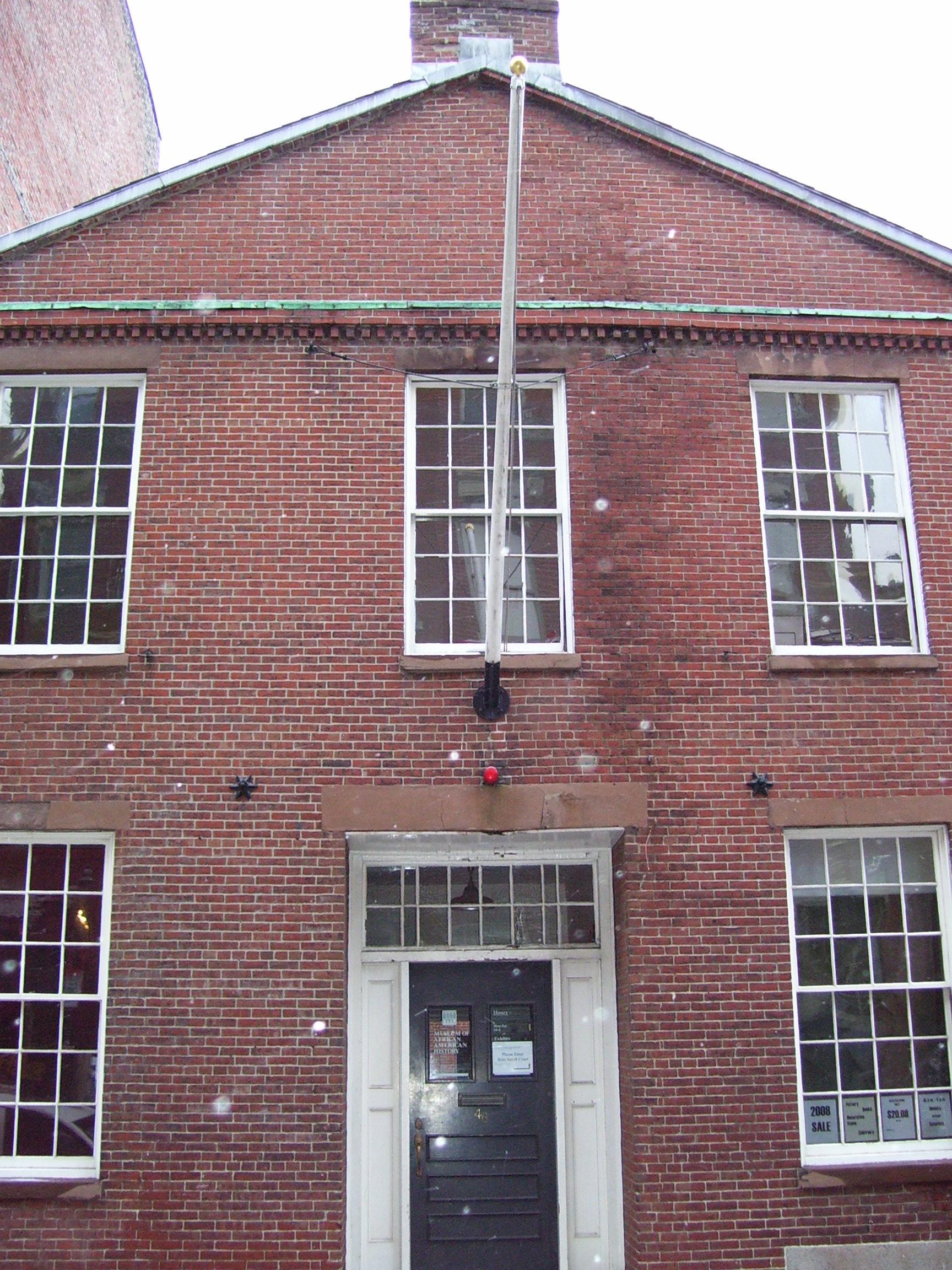
Abiel Smith School – facade, 2008

== History ==
African-American parents organized a school for their children in 1798; it was first held in Primus Hall's home. After the African Meeting House was constructed, the school was moved there to a first-floor classroom.

The African-American community worked to gain support from the city for their school as a public school, and the city started to contribute some funds in 1812. Abiel Smith, a white philanthropist, left money (an estimated $4,000) in his will to the city of Boston for the education of black children. The city used part of his legacy to construct the school building next to the African Meeting House, commissioning Richard Upjohn as architect, in his first public project. He later became well known for his church projects.

When the school was completed in 1835, all black children in Boston were assigned to it, replacing the basement school next door. The north side of Beacon Hill was then the residential center of the black community. Parents continued to press the city to improve services, as conditions at the school were less than in white public schools.

Thomas Dalton was elected president in 1834 of the Infant School Association created to support the new Abiel Smith School for colored children built on Belknap Street (now Joy Street). He helped organize the colored citizens of Boston to elect supportive School Committee members. "Resolved, That to secure the blessings of knowledge, every possible effort should be made by us ... to secure such persons as we know to be favorable to the elevation of the people of color to their natural, civil, political, and religious rights, and are interested in the education of our children." He was among those signing a petition to the School Committee of the City of Boston for improved schools for Boston children of color. He was instrumental in the long fight to integrate the schools of Boston. In 1849, the Massachusetts Supreme Court ruled that segregated schools were allowed under the state's constitution (Roberts v. City of Boston). Integration of Boston's schools was achieved in 1855 after parents withdrew their children for a time from the Smith School and Benjamin F. Roberts helped bring the issue to the state legislature. The Smith School was closed the same year as schools in Boston were desegregated.

In the 1870s, many people migrated to the South End where new schools and churches were founded.

== Legacy ==
The former school, designated as part of the Beacon Hill Historic District (a National Historic Landmark), is a site on the Boston Black Heritage Trail and is now part of the Museum of African American History. With a renovation project completed in February 2000, it serves, in part, as the administrative offices for the Museum. It is also within the Boston African American National Historic Site.

== Alumni ==
- William Cooper Nell

== Bibliography ==
- Bower, Beth Ann. "The African Meeting House, Massachusetts: Summary Report of Archaeological Excavation, 1975–1986." Museum of African American History, Boston, MA.
- Jacobs, Donald M. ed. Courage and Conscience: Black and White Abolitionists in Boston. Bloomington: Indiana University Press for the Boston Anthenaeum, 1993
- Kendrick, Stephen and Kendrick, Paul. Sarah's Long Walk: The Free Blacks of Boston and How Their Struggle for Equality Changes America. Boston: Beacon Hill Press, 2004.
- Wesley, Dorothy Porter, and Constance Porter Uzelac, eds. William Cooper Nell, Nineteenth-Century African American Abolitionist, Historian, Integrationist: Selected Writings, 1832–1874. Baltimore: Black Classic Press, 2002.
