= Ellen and William Craft =

American fugitive slaves and abolitionists

Ellen and William Craft, fugitive slaves and abolitionists, c. 1872

Ellen Craft (1826–1891) and William Craft (September 25, 1824 – January 29, 1900) were American abolitionists who were born into slavery in Macon, Georgia. They escaped to the Northern United States in December 1848 by traveling by train and steamboat, arriving in Philadelphia on Christmas Day. Ellen crossed the boundaries of race, class, and gender by passing as a white planter with William posing as her servant. Their escape was widely publicized, making them among the most famous fugitive slaves in the United States. Abolitionists featured them in public lectures to gain support in the struggle to end the institution.

As prominent fugitives, they were threatened by slave catchers in Boston after the passage of the Fugitive Slave Act of 1850, so the Crafts emigrated to England. They lived there for nearly two decades and raised five children. The Crafts lectured publicly about their escape and opposed the Confederate States of America during the American Civil War. In 1860, they published a written account of their escape titled Running a Thousand Miles for Freedom; Or, The Escape of William and Ellen Craft from Slavery. One of the most compelling of the many slave narratives published before the Civil War, their book reached wide audiences in the United Kingdom and the United States. After their return to the U.S. in 1868, the Crafts opened an agricultural school in Georgia for freedmen's children. They worked at the school and its farm until 1890. Their account was reprinted in the United States in 1999, with both the Crafts credited as authors.

== Early life ==
Ellen Craft was born in 1826 in Clinton, Georgia, to Maria, a mixed-race enslaved woman, and her wealthy planter slaveholder, Major James Smith. At least three-quarters European by ancestry, Ellen was very fair-skinned and resembled her white half-siblings, who were her enslaver's legitimate children. Smith's wife gave the 11-year-old Ellen as a wedding gift to her daughter, Eliza Cromwell Smith, to get the girl out of the household and remove the evidence of her husband's infidelity.

After Eliza Smith married Dr. Robert Collins, she took Ellen with her to live in the city of Macon where they made their home. Ellen grew up as a house servant to Eliza, which gave her privileged access to information about the area.

William was born in Macon, where he met his future wife at the age of 16 when his first enslaver sold him to settle gambling debts. Before he was sold, William witnessed his 14-year-old sister and his parents being separated by sales to different owners. William's new enslaver apprenticed him as a carpenter and allowed him to work for fees, taking most of his earnings.

== Marriage and family ==
At age 20, Ellen married William Craft, in whom her enslaver Collins held a half interest. Craft saved money from being hired out in town as a carpenter. Not wanting to have a family in slavery, during the Christmas season of 1848, the couple planned an escape.

Eventually, they had five children born and raised during their nearly two decades living in England. The Crafts went there after the Fugitive Slave Act of 1850 was passed because they were in danger of being captured in Boston by bounty hunters. Their children were Charles Estlin Phillips (1852–1938), William Ivens (1855–1926), Brougham H. (1857–1920), Ellen A. Craft (1863–1917) and Alfred G. (1871–1939). Three of their children came with them when the Crafts returned to the United States after the American Civil War.

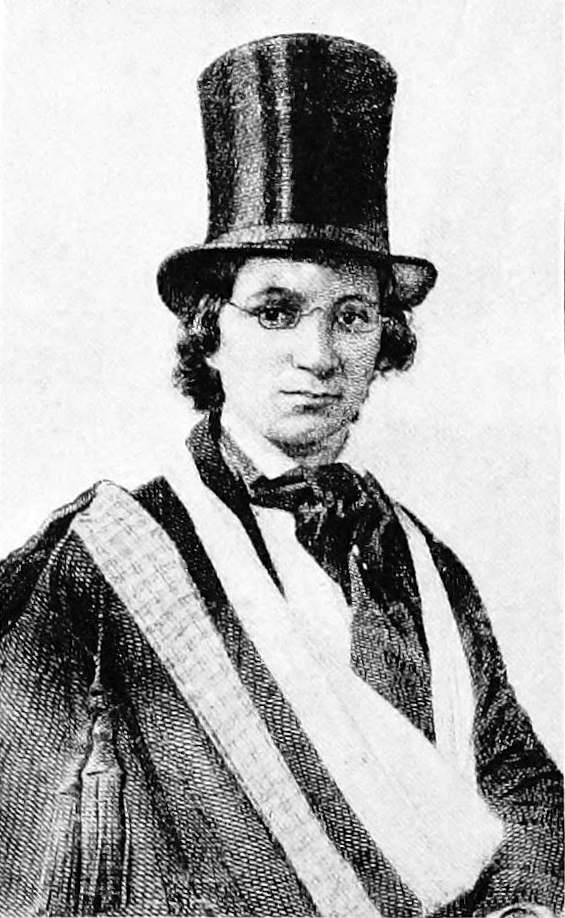
Ellen Craft dressed as a man to escape from slavery.

== Escape ==
Ellen planned to take advantage of her appearance to pass as white while the pair traveled by train and boat to the North; she dressed as a man since, at the time, it was not customary for a white woman to travel alone with an enslaved man. She also faked illness to limit conversation, as she was prevented from learning to read and write with the threat of death because she was enslaved. William was to act as a personal servant. During that time, slaves frequently accompanied their owners during travel, so the Crafts did not expect to be questioned. To their surprise, they were detained, but only temporarily. An officer had demanded proof that William was indeed Ellen's property. They were finally let on the train due to sympathy from passengers and the conductor.

During their escape, they traveled on first class trains, stayed in the best hotels, and Ellen dined one evening with a steamboat captain. Ellen dyed her hair and bought appropriate clothes to pass as a young man, traveling in a jacket and trousers. William used his earnings as a cabinet-maker to buy clothes for Ellen to appear as a free white man. William cut her hair to add to her manly appearance. Ellen also practiced the correct gestures and behavior. She wore her right arm in a sling to hide the fact that she could not write. They traveled to nearby Macon for a train to Savannah. Although the Crafts had several close calls, they successfully avoided detection. On December 21, they boarded a steamship for Philadelphia, in the free state of Pennsylvania, where they arrived early on the morning of Christmas Day.

Their innovation was in escaping as a pair, though Ellen's bravery and genius made their escape successful. Historians have noted other enslaved women who posed as men to escape, such as Clarissa Davis of Virginia, who dressed as a man and took a New England-bound ship to freedom; Mary Millburn, who also sailed as a male passenger; and Maria Weems from the District of Columbia, who as a young woman of fifteen, dressed as a man and escaped.

Soon after the Crafts arrived in the North, abolitionists such as William Lloyd Garrison and William Wells Brown encouraged them to recount their escape in public lectures to abolitionist circles in New England. They moved to the well-established free black community on the north side of Beacon Hill in Boston, where they were married in a Christian ceremony. Ellen Craft posed in her escape clothes for a photograph. Abolitionists widely distributed it as part of their campaign against slavery.

During the next two years, the Crafts made numerous public appearances to recount their escape and speak against slavery. Because society generally disapproved of women speaking to public audiences of mixed gender at the time, Ellen typically stood on the stage while William told their story. An article of April 27, 1849, in the abolitionist paper The Liberator, however, reported her speaking to an audience of 800–900 people in Newburyport, Massachusetts. Audiences were intensely curious about the young woman who had been bold in the escape. In 1850, Congress passed the Fugitive Slave Act, which increased penalties for aiding fugitive slaves and required residents and law enforcement of free states to cooperate in capturing and returning them to their owners. The act provided a reward to officers and simplified the process by which people might be certified as slaves, requiring little documentation from slave catchers. Commissioners appointed to hear such cases were paid more for ruling that a person was a slave than not.

A month after the new law took effect, Collins sent two bounty hunters to Boston to capture the Crafts. Willis H. Hughes and John Knight traveled north from Macon intending to capture William and Ellen Craft; upon arriving in Boston, they were met with resistance on the part of both white and black Bostonians. Abolitionists in Boston had formed the biracial Boston Vigilance Committee to resist the new Slave Bill; its members protected the Crafts by moving them around various "safe houses", such as the Tappan-Philbrick house in the nearby town of Brookline, until they could leave the country. The two bounty hunters arrived in Boston on October 25, 1850, and, after resistance from the locals, fled south after being warned on October 30 that their safety in Boston could not be assured. Collins even appealed to U.S. President Millard Fillmore, asking him to intervene so he could regain his "property". Fillmore agreed that the Crafts should be returned to their owners in the South and authorized the use of military force if necessary to take them.

== Flight and life in the United Kingdom ==
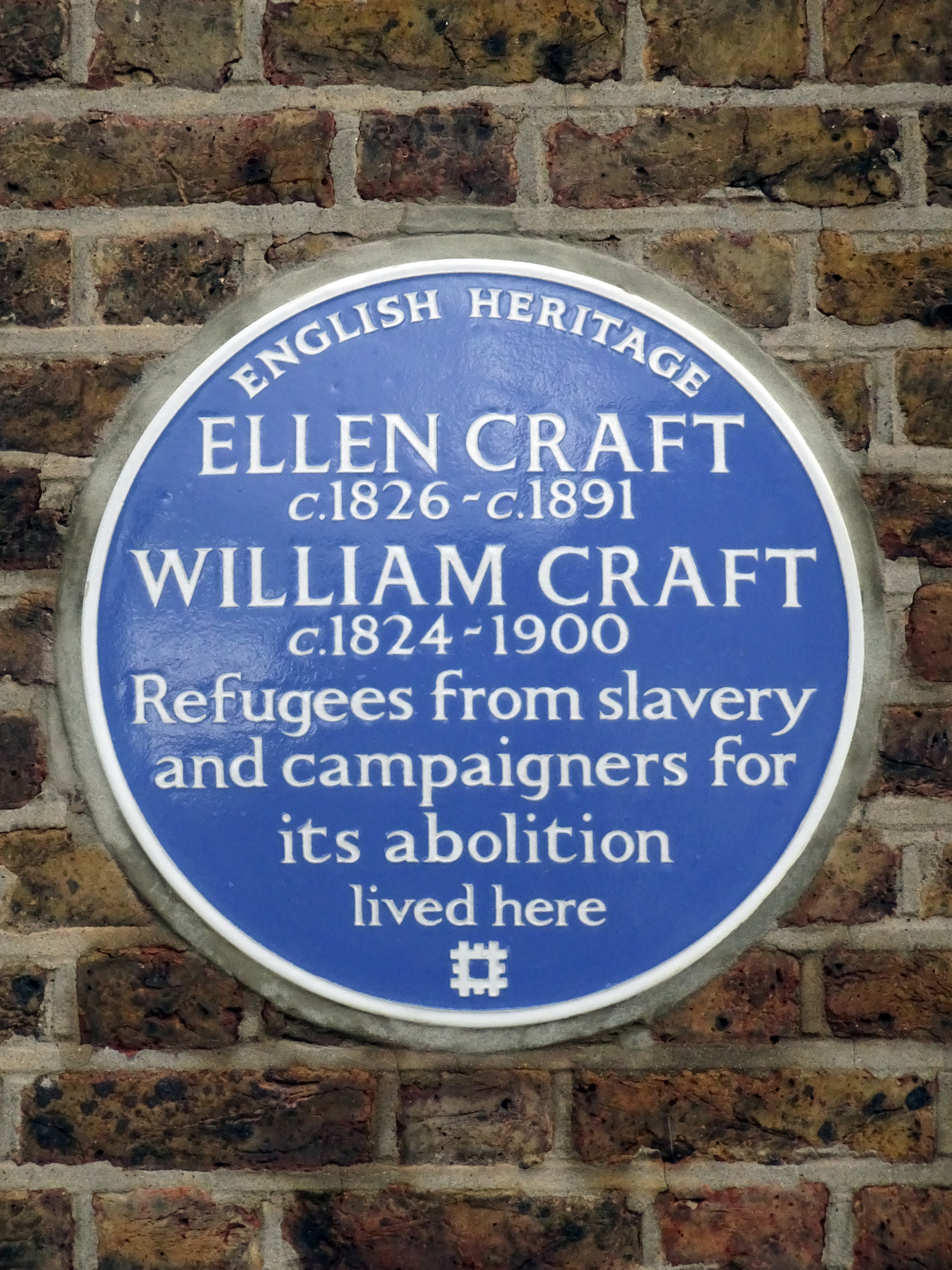
Plaque at 26 Cambridge Grove, Hammersmith, London

Aided by their supporters, the Crafts decided to escape to England. They traveled from Portland, Maine to Halifax, Nova Scotia, where they boarded the Cambria, bound for Liverpool. The abolitionist Lydia Neal Dennett arranged their passage on a steamship to England. As William later recounted in their memoir, "It was not until we stepped ashore at Liverpool that we were free from every slavish fear." They were aided in England by a group of prominent abolitionists, including Wilson Armistead, with whom they were residing in Leeds when the census was taken in 1851 and who recorded his guests as "fugitive slaves," and Harriet Martineau who arranged for their intensive schooling at the village school in Ockham, Surrey.

Having learned to read and write, Ellen Craft published the following, widely circulated in the abolitionist press in both the United Kingdom and the United States in 1852. The proslavery press in the U.S. had suggested the Crafts regretted their flight to England. She said:

So I write these few lines merely to say that the statement is entirely unfounded, for I have never had the slightest inclination whatever of returning to bondage; and God forbid that I should ever be so false to liberty as to prefer slavery in its stead. In fact, since my escape from slavery, I have gotten much better in every respect than I could have possibly anticipated. Though, had it been to the contrary, my feelings in regard to this would have been just the same, for I had much rather starve in England, a free woman, than be a slave for the best man that ever breathed upon the American continent.

— Anti-Slavery Advocate, December 1852

The Crafts spent 19 years together in England, where they had five children. Ellen participated in reform organizations such as the London Emancipation Committee, the Women's Suffrage Organization, and the British and Foreign Freedmen's Society. They earned speaking fees by public lectures about slavery in the U.S. and their escape. William Craft set up a business again, but they still struggled financially. For most of their time in England, the Craft family lived in Hammersmith although they did lecture elsewhere, such as Swansea possibly via an introduction from Jessie Donaldson, an anti-slavery abolitionist. Ellen turned their home into a hub of Black activism: she invited fellow Black abolitionists to stay (including Sarah Parker Remond) and supported other abolitionists such as John Sella Martin.

One eyewitness said her "sophisticated grasp of the power of political improvisation" was acute; an instance of this "grasp" was displayed during a dinner conversation she had with the former Governor of Jamaica, Edward J. Eyre (who had recently suppressed the Morant Bay rebellion), whom she was seated beside. Unaware of his background, she discussed the situation in Jamaica with him; when it was pointed out to her by other dinner guests whom she was sitting next to, she subtly criticized his decision to execute Jamaican politician George William Gordon for his supposed involvement in the rebellion: "Do you not yourself, sir, feel now that poor Gordon was unjustly executed?" In another encounter with the American writer Charles Farrar Browne (also known as Artemius Ward), who was notorious for his racist portrayals of African Americans, Craft, "looking him straight in the eye," challenged him, and stated he should "never again write anything which shall make people believe that you are against the negro."

After the American Civil War ended, Ellen located her mother, Maria, in Georgia; she paid for her passage to England, where they were reunited.

== Return to the United States ==
In 1868, after the American Civil War and passage of constitutional amendments granting emancipation, citizenship, and rights to freedmen, the Crafts returned with three of their children to the United States. They raised funds from supporters, and in 1870, they bought 1,800 acres (730 ha) of land in Georgia near Savannah in Bryan County. There, they founded the Woodville Co-operative Farm School in 1873 to educate and employ freedmen. In 1876, William Craft was charged with misuse of funds, and he lost a libel dispute in 1878 in which he tried to clear his name. William lost the case under the Bostonian Black codes in exercising his civil and political rights. The school closed soon after. Although the Crafts attempted to keep the farm running, dropping cotton prices and post-Reconstruction era violence contributed to its failure. Whites discriminated against freedmen while working to re-establish white supremacy in politics and economics. By 1876, white Democrats regained control of the state governments in the South.

In 1890, the Crafts moved to Charleston, South Carolina to live with their daughter Ellen, who was married to a doctor named William D. Crum. He was appointed Collector of the Port of Charleston by President Theodore Roosevelt. The elder Ellen Craft died in 1891, and her widower William on January 29, 1900.

== Running a Thousand Miles for Freedom ==
Their book provides a unique view of race, gender, and class in the 19th century. It offers examples of racial passing, cross-dressing, and middle-class "performance" in a society in which each of these boundaries was thought to be distinct and stable. While published initially with only William's name as author, twentieth-century and more recent scholarship has re-evaluated Ellen's likely contribution, noting the inclusion of material about Sally Miller and other female fugitives. Reprints since the 1990s have listed both the Crafts as authors.

Their escape, particularly Ellen's disguise, which played on many layers of appearance and identity, showed the interlocking nature of race, gender, and class. Ellen had to "perform" in all three arenas simultaneously for the couple to travel undetected. Since only William's narrative voice tells their joint story in the book, critics say it suggests how difficult it was for a black woman to find a public voice, although she was bold in action. Sarah Brusky says that, in the way that she used wrappings to "muffle" herself during the escape to avoid conversation, Ellen is presented in the book through the filter of William's perspective.

Historians and readers cannot evaluate how much Ellen contributed to recounting their story, but audiences appreciated seeing the young woman who had been so daring. On one occasion, a newspaper notes, there was "considerable disappointment" when Ellen Craft was absent. Since they appeared for ten years, as William recounted their escape, they could respond to audiences' reactions to Ellen in person and to hearing of her actions. It is likely their published account reflects her influence.

== Relationship to the Healy Family ==
In February 2024, Washington Post writer Bryan Greene established through DNA evidence that Ellen Craft was a blood relative of the Healy family, which included several siblings once enslaved in Jones County, Georgia, who later distinguished themselves as leaders in the Catholic Church and other endeavors. DNA test results showed a descendant of Martha Healy was a 4th to 8th cousin with three of Craft's descendants. In his article, Greene cited an 1893 account from S.T. Pickard, onetime editor of the Portland Transcript, who said Ellen Craft told him she was the first cousin of James Augustine Healy, the Bishop of Portland, Maine. The 2024 DNA results establish some 131 years later that Craft was, in fact, a relative.

== Legacy and honors ==
- In 1996, Ellen Craft was inducted into Georgia Women of Achievement.
- Their life, accomplishments, and history are displayed at the Tubman African American Museum in Macon, Georgia.
- They are mentioned in connection with the Lewis and Harriet Hayden House on the Boston Women's Heritage Trail.
- In September 2018, at the village of Ockham, Surrey, where they found refuge, a sign commemorating their escape was unveiled at an event their great-great-grandson Christopher Clark and other descendants attended.
- Their residence in Hammersmith, London is commemorated by a blue plaque on the wall of Craft Court, the office of the Shepherds Bush Housing Association. English Heritage announced that Ellen Craft, along with her husband William, was one of six women whom they honored with a blue plaque in 2021. The plaque was unveiled in September 2021.
- Ellen Craft is portrayed in Sanctuary Road by composer Paul Moravec and librettist Mark Campbell as an oratorio and opera. Sanctuary Road is based on the writings of abolitionist William Still and is based on the astonishing stories to be found in his book, titled The Underground Railroad, which is a documentation of the network of secret routes and safe houses used by African American slaves to escape into free states and Canada during the early- to mid-1800s. The oratorio premiered at Carnegie Hall in May, 2018. An opera version of Sanctuary Road premiered in Raleigh, North Carolina, in March 2022. A recording is available. A video of the opera can be viewed here.

== See also ==
- List of African-American abolitionists
- List of slaves
- Henry Box Brown
- Anna Maria Weems
