= Twelfth Baptist Church =

Church in Boston

Coordinates: 42°19′31.2″N 71°4′58.4″W

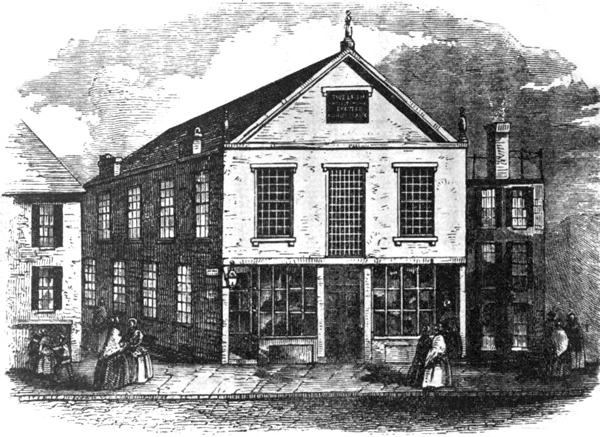
"Church of the Fugitive Slaves in Boston," from Anthony Burns: A History by Charles E. Stevens, 1856.

The Twelfth Baptist Church is a historic church in the Roxbury neighborhood of Boston, Massachusetts. Established in 1840, it is the oldest direct descendant of the First Independent Baptist Church in Beacon Hill. Notable members have included abolitionists such as Lewis Hayden and Rev. Leonard Grimes, the historian George Washington Williams, the artist Edward Mitchell Bannister, abolitionist and entrepreneur Christiana Carteaux, pioneering educator Wilhelmina Crosson, and civil rights movement leader Dr. Martin Luther King Jr.

== History ==
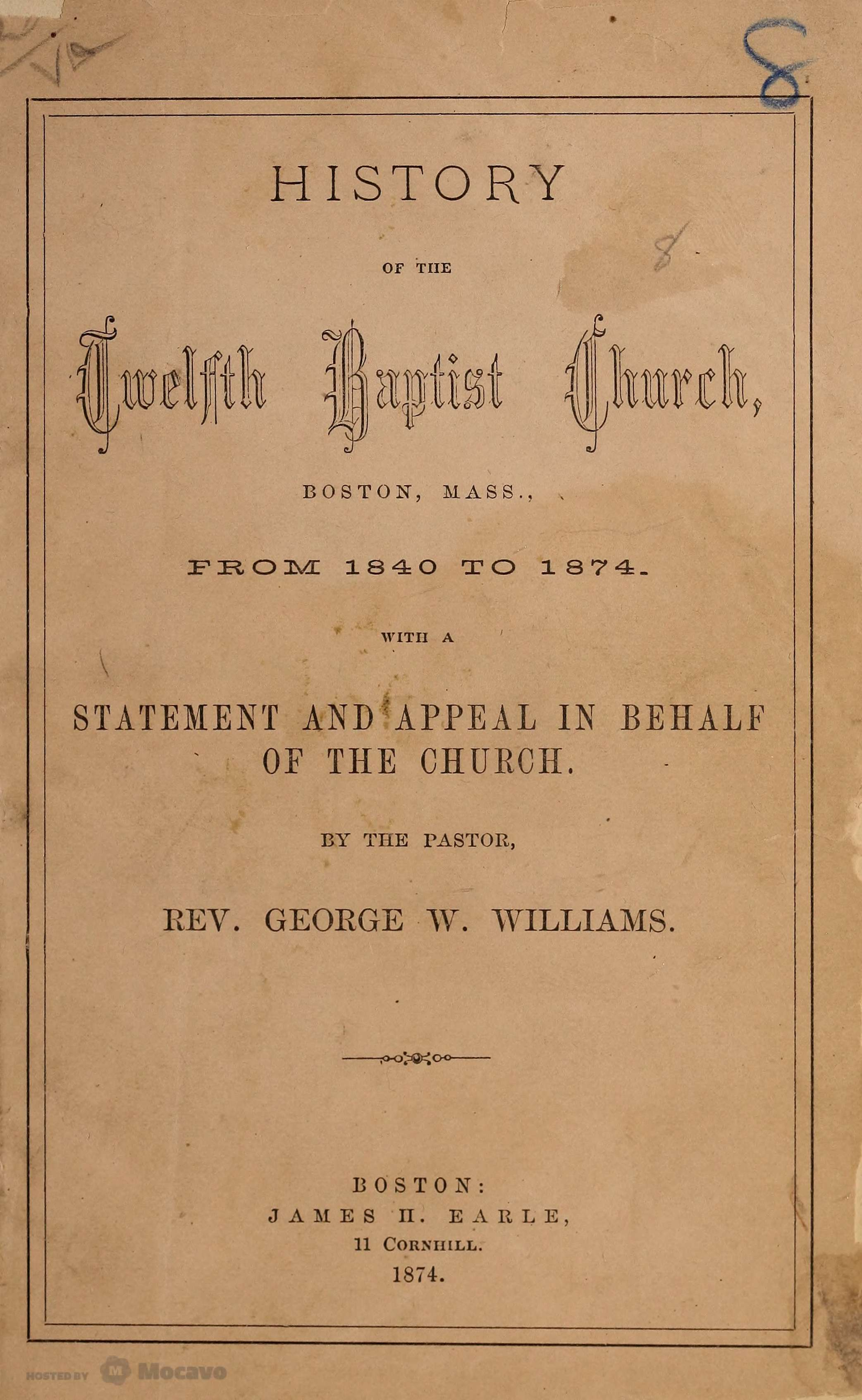
Title page of History of the Twelfth Baptist Church by George Washington Williams, 1874

The Twelfth Baptist Church was established in 1840 when a group of 36 dissenters broke with the First Independent Baptist Church, which met in what is now known as the African Meeting House. The exact reason for the split is not clear. According to some historians, the dissenters wanted to take a more aggressive stand against slavery than the other members. Additionally, the First Independent Baptist Church had not had a permanent minister for some time, which may have given rise to general disagreements as to how to run the church.

At the time of the split, Rev. George H. Black—a Baptist minister and native of the West Indies—was serving as pastor of the First Independent Baptist Church and led those who separated from the congregation. When the separation occurred in 1840, the new group initially relocated to an adjacent building on Smith Court. Later, they moved to Phillips Street in Beacon Hill. The Rev. Leonard Grimes was ordained as its first pastor in 1848. Grimes was an abolitionist and Underground Railroad conductor who had served two years in prison for attempting to rescue a family of slaves in Virginia. Under his leadership, the church became known as "The Fugitive Slave Church." Scores of escaped slaves were aided by the church, and many chose to join the congregation. Early members included Lewis and Harriet Hayden, Shadrach Minkins, Anthony Burns, Thomas Sims, Peter Randolph, and John S. Rock. Grimes served as pastor until his death in 1873.

The Twelfth Baptist Church historically hosted live literary and musical entertainment, including a performance series of performances by the Union Progressive Association in 1866.

In 1907, the church moved to the former Jewish temple Mishkan Tefila at 47 Shawmut Avenue in Roxbury. It later moved to its current location at 150-160 Warren Street.

The church has had many notable pastors and members. Rev. George Washington Williams, its second pastor, was a Civil War veteran, lawyer, journalist, and groundbreaking historian. Williams wrote a history of the church in 1874. Rev. J. Allen Kirk wrote an oft-cited account of the Wilmington massacre of 1898. Rev. Matthew A. N. Shaw was president of the National Equal Rights League of Boston, and organized the Negro Sanhedrin conference of 1924.

Noted educator Wilhelmina Crosson taught Sunday School at the Twelfth Baptist Church in the 1940s. One of the first African-American female schoolteachers in Boston, Crosson developed the city's first remedial reading program, and was an early advocate of black history education.

Rev. William Hunter Hester wrote a history of the Twelfth Baptist Church in 1946.Hester was an old friend of Martin Luther King Sr. In the 1950s, Martin Luther King Jr. worked with him as an assistant minister pursuing doctoral studies in theology at Boston University.

Rev. Dr. Michael E. Haynes began serving the Twelfth Baptist Church as a Youth Minister beginning in 1951. He later became an Associate Minister, and finally a Senior Minister for the church in 1964. Described by Rev. Willie Bodrick, II, the church's current pastor, as "a visionary statesman, pastor, and civic leader who bridged the pulpit and policy," Rev. Haynes was active in the civil rights movement and represented Roxbury in the Massachusetts House of Representatives in the 1960s. He was instrumental in founding the Boston/Roxbury campus of Godron-Conwell Theological Seminary—known as the Center for Urban Ministerial Education (CUME) -- in 1976 to provide "ministerial training for Hispanic/Latino, African American, Asian and other ethnic minority pastors and church leaders in Boston and throughout the U.S." Rev. Haynes retired from the Twelfth Baptist Church in 2004.

Rev. Dr. Arthur T. Gerald, Jr. served as a Pastor for the Twelfth Baptist Church from 2010 to 2020. According to Rev. Bodrick, Rev. Gerald "championed a theology of action - that the Gospel must not only be preached from the pulpit but embodies in the streets of Roxbury and beyond." He supported the church's mentorship programs, food and clothing ministries, youth development programs, and partnerships with local schools and nonprofits, strengthening the church's relationships with civic and interfaith partners.

On September 20, 2021, King Boston donated $1 million to support the church.

As of 2025, the church operates a food pantry, supports affordable housing, and advocates for incarcerated people. The church also has global missions that support an orphanage in Honduras and a school in Liberia.

== Pastors ==
Pastors of the Twelfth Baptist Church to date:

1. Rev. Leonard Grimes (1848–1874)
2. Rev. George Washington Williams (1874–1876)
3. Rev. Williams Dennis (1876–1880)
4. Rev. L. F. Walden (1880–1885)
5. Rev. Robert Fairfax (1886–1890)
6. Rev. H. H. Harris (1890–1891)
7. Rev. J. Allen Kirk (1891–1894)
8. Rev. Alfred W. Adams (1895-1898)
9. Rev. Johnson W. Hill (1898-1899)
10. Rev. Matthew A. N. Shaw (1899–1923)
11. Rev. William Hunter Hester (1924–1964)
12. Rev. Dr. Michael E. Haynes (1964–2004)
13. Rev. Dr. Arthur T. Gerald, Jr. (2010–2020)
14. Rev. Dr. Willie Bodrick, II (2021–Present)
