= Peter Randolph =

Peter Randolph may refer to:

- Peter Randolph (judge) (1779–1832)
- Peter Randolph (minister) (c. 1825–1897)
