= Boston Street Scene (Boston Common) =

Painting by Edward Mitchell Bannister

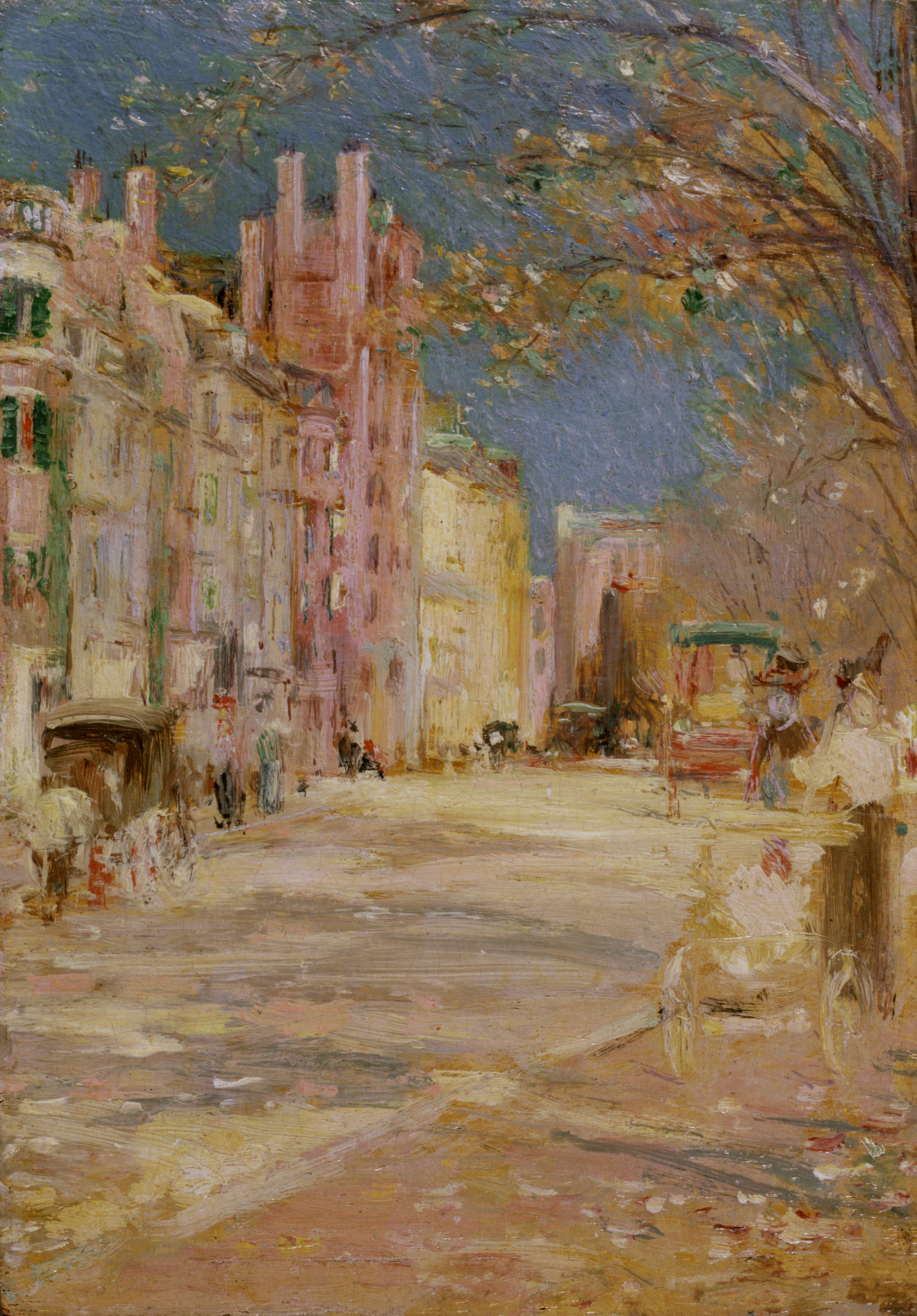
Edward Mitchell Bannister, Boston Street Scene (Boston Common), 1898-1899, Walters Art Museum

Boston Street Scene (Boston Common) is an 1898–1899 oil painting by African-American artist Edward Mitchell Bannister made during a visit to Boston, Massachusetts.

== History ==
Bannister made the painting during a visit to Boston in the 1890s. The painting was bought in 2002 by the Walters Art Museum in Baltimore.

== Description ==
The small oil-on-canvas work measures 8 in × 5.5 in (20 cm × 14 cm). It depicts a street scene on the edge of Boston Common, perhaps Beacon Street. Bannister uses the diagonal edge of the sidewalk beside the park to draw the eye into the painting, with two women walking with a baby in a stroller in the right foreground. Traffic is light on the street to the left, just a few horse-drawn carriages, and more people walking on the other side of the street, past buildings of five or more floors. In contrast to his usual paintings of New England landscapes in a realistic manner with a muted natural palette, similar to the French Barbizon school, this work adopts a much brighter, almost Fauvist, palette of yellows, pinks, reds, greens and blues, and a loose Impressionist style.
