= Michael E. Haynes =

American politician and minister (1927–2019)

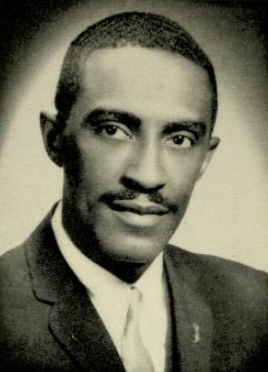
- Haynes circa 1969

Member of the Massachusetts House of Representatives, 7th Suffolk district
- In office 1965–1969

Personal details
- Born: May 9, 1927 Boston, Massachusetts, U.S.
- Died: September 12, 2019 (aged 92)
- Party: Democratic
- Occupation: Minister

Michael E. Haynes (May 9, 1927 – September 12, 2019) was an American minister and politician in the state of Massachusetts. His parents, Gustavus and Edna, were immigrants from Barbados.

== Education and career ==
He was educated at Boston English High School, graduating in 1944, and earned his bachelor's degree from New England School of Theology in 1949. He later completed graduate studies at Shelton College. He served in the Massachusetts House of Representatives from 1965 to 1968, representing Roxbury, Massachusetts. Haynes was appointed to the state parole board by Governor Francis Sargent. He was also a member of the Boston Mayor's Committee on Violence and the Attorney General's Advisory Committee on Drug Addiction. He was pastor at Twelfth Baptist Church in Roxbury from 1964 to 2004.

During the 1960s and 1970s Haynes played an active role in the civil rights movement. In 1965, he helped plan Martin Luther King Jr.'s entrance into Boston when he came to speak on Boston Common that spring. The major focus of King's speech on April 23 was school desegregation in Boston.

The Haynes Early Education school located in Roxbury was named in his honor.

On November 9, 2006, Northeastern University President Joseph E. Aoun met with members of the Black Ministerial Alliance of Massachusetts to discuss possible collaborations between Northeastern and Lower Roxbury clergy. During the meeting, Haynes suggested the university create a history of the African American community in Lower Roxbury. As a result, Aoun appointed Joseph D. Warren, at that time Special Assistant to the Director of Government Relations and Community Affairs, to oversee the Lower Roxbury Black History Project. Warren appointed an advisory board consisting of Haynes, Massachusetts State Representative Byron Rushing, Northeastern University Archivist Joan D. Krizack, and Northeastern University history professors.

== Personal life ==
His older brother was jazz drummer Roy Haynes.

Michael Haynes died on September 12, 2019.

== See also ==
- 1965–1966 Massachusetts legislature
- 1969-1970 Massachusetts legislature
