= Theodore Doughty Miller =

Baptist Preacher

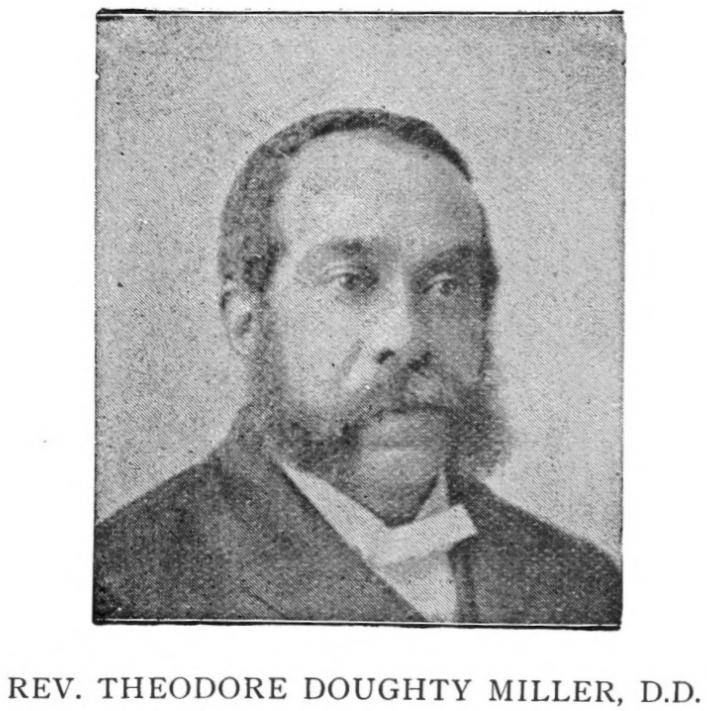
- Photo of Miller from 1892.
- Born: September 19, 1835; New York City, New York, U.S.
- Died: March 1, 1897 (aged 61)
- Occupation: preacher

Religious life
- Religion: Baptist

Theodore Doughty Miller (September 19, 1835 – March 1, 1897) was a Baptist preacher from Philadelphia, Pennsylvania in the late 19th century. Before the US Civil War (1861–1865), he was a part of abolitionist society in Philadelphia, and after the war he played a leading role in the Baptist Church. In 1881 he was called "the best colored preacher ever located in Philadelphia".

== Early life ==
Miller was born September 19, 1835, in New York City. His parents were Henry and Sarah Miller. Henry died when Theodore was an infant and Sarah died when he was about sixteen. He had an older brother who went to California during the gold rush and died in the 1862 sinking of the SS Golden Gate. As a boy, he went to colored school no. 1 headed by John Patterson. In July, 1849 he passed the teacher's examination and became first assistant in the Public High School. As a youth he attended St. Phillips Episcopal Church. He left this church and joined the Church of the Messiah led by Alexander Crummell.

From 1849 to 1851 he studied during the evenings and Saturdays at the St. Augustine Institute and began to study all religious creeds and compare them with the bible. He was baptized into the Baptist church, but did not agree with that church's doctrine of Baptism. In 1851 he moved to Trenton, New Jersey, to become principal of a public school there. Around that time he married Elizabeth P. Wood. He also helped form a young men's association and organized a choir and Sunday school of the local Mt. Zion A. M. E. church. In 1856 he left Trenton to take charge of a public school at Newburgh, New York, where he finally joined the Baptist church along with his wife, both being baptized February 22, 1857, in the Hudson River. He joined the Shiloh Baptist Church where his position as a church leader was opposed by the white pastor. In spite of this, he was chosen as teacher and then superintendent of the Sunday school and made a trustee and deacon of the church. When his further advancement was opposed by the pastor, he opened his own church where he preached on Sunday afternoons and nights - although he was not licensed to preach by the Church. He attended the American Baptist Missionary Society Convention at Philadelphia in 1858 where he along with Leonard Grimes, William Spellman, and Sampson White pushed the organization to oppose slavery. They voted to have no fellowship with slave-holding ministries. He preached at the convention and he was given a recommendation that he be licensed, either at Shiloh or at the First Baptist Church, a white church which had promised to give him license. Under this pressure, Shiloh granted him a license and he began to preach.

In 1858, he was called by the Zion Baptist Church of New Haven, Connecticut, and was ordained on January 19, 1859, at the Concord Street Church in Brooklyn. That same year, he moved to Albany, New York, where he preached for five years at the Hamilton Street Baptist Church. In Albany, Miller supported anti-slavery efforts and served as secretary of the Irrepressible Conflict Society for Human Rights organized immediately following the execution of John Brown in December 1859. During this time he studied under Elias Lyman Magoon, a noted preacher in Albany. In 1864, he preached at Oak Street Baptist Church and the Pearl Street Church, both in West Philadelphia, and became pastor at the Pearl Street Branch on August 1, where he finally settled. The church was also known as the First Baptist Church and moved to Cherry Street when it overran capacity at the previous location.

== Leadership in the Baptist Church ==
He held many leadership positions in the church, including corresponding secretary of the American Baptist Missionary Convention and recording secretary of the New England Baptist Missionary Convention. He gave the opening sermon at the Philadelphia Baptist Association in 1879. He led the Sunday School at his church. He organized a church in Princeton, New Jersey, and a branch of his church in Germantown, Philadelphia. He also received a Doctor of Divinity. In 1894, Miller was elected moderator of the Philadelphia Baptist Association convention, the first black man ever elected to that position He also submitted articles to newspapers, including a pre-Emancipation Proclamation poem, "God Never Made a Sin", which was in the Louisville Newspaper February 10, 1849, and included the refrain, "but [God] never, never made a slave."

== Death ==
Miller died on March 1, 1897.
