= Edward Mitchell Bannister =

Canadian–American painter (1828–1901)

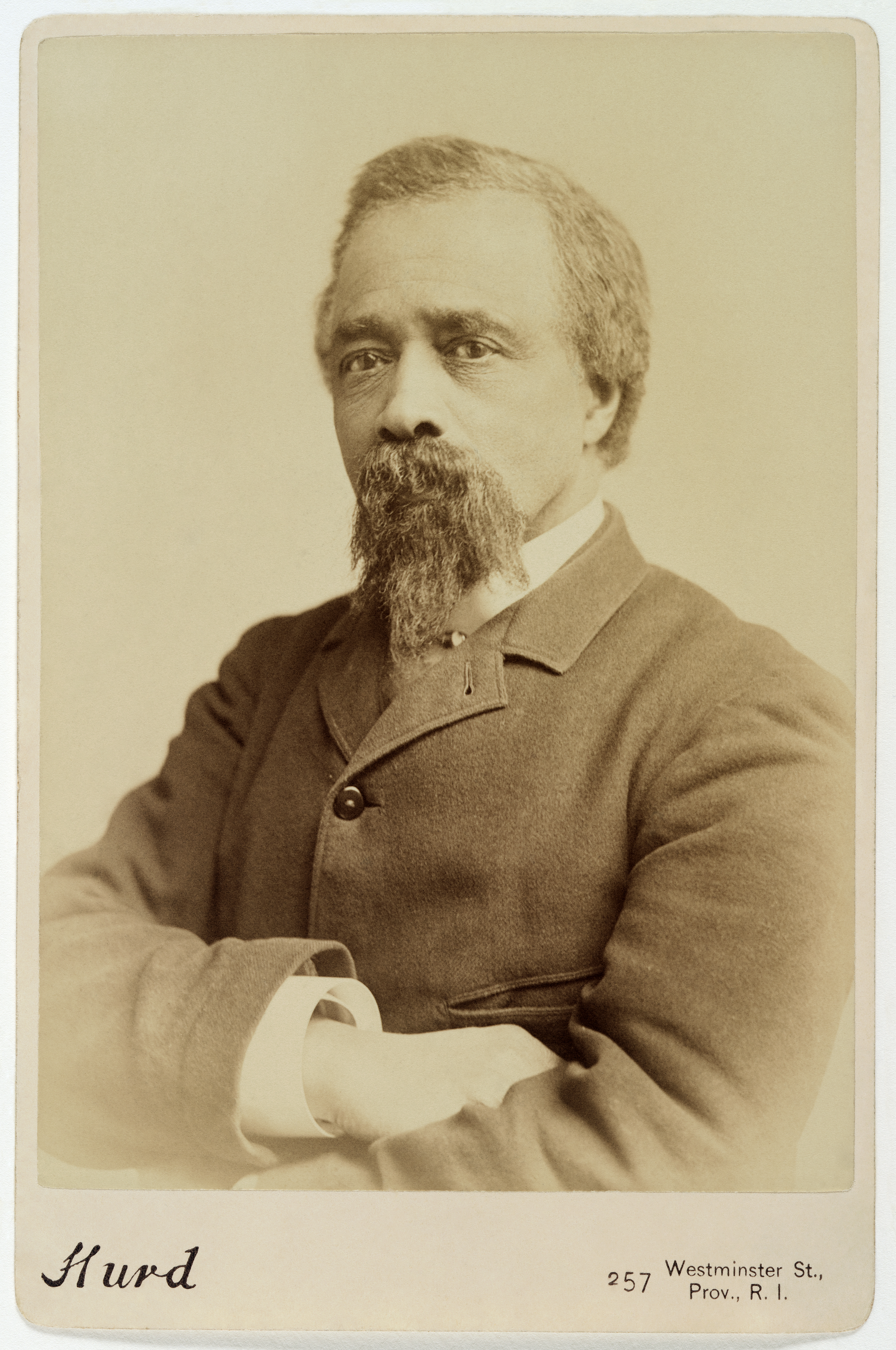
- Bannister, c. 1880
- Born: November 2, 1828; Saint Andrews, Colony of New Brunswick, British North America
- Died: January 9, 1901 (aged 72); Providence, Rhode Island, US
- Resting place: North Burial Ground
- Other names: Edwin; Ned
- Citizenship: Canada (Note: While some sources mention Bannister as being Canadian, he was originally from and left New Brunswick while it was a British colony prior to Canada's confederation in 1867.); United States
- Education: Lowell Institute
- Style: American Barbizon school
- Spouse: Christiana Carteaux (m. 1857)
- Awards: First Prize Philadelphia Centennial; 1876 Under the Oaks

Edward Mitchell Bannister (November 2, 1828 – January 9, 1901) was a Canadian–American oil painter of the American Barbizon School. Born in colonial New Brunswick, he spent his adult life in New England in the United States. There, along with his wife Christiana Carteaux, he was a prominent member of African-American cultural and political communities, such as the Boston abolition movement. Bannister received national recognition after he won a first prize in painting at the 1876 Philadelphia Centennial Exhibition. He was also a founding member of the Providence Art Club and the Rhode Island School of Design.

Bannister's style and predominantly pastoral subject matter reflected his admiration for the French artist Jean-François Millet and the French Barbizon School. A lifelong sailor, he also looked to the Rhode Island seaside for inspiration. Bannister continually experimented, and his artwork displays his Idealist philosophy and his control of color and atmosphere. He began his professional practice as a photographer and portraitist before developing his better-known landscape style.

Later in his life, Bannister's style of landscape painting fell out of favor. With decreasing painting sales, he and Christiana Carteaux moved out of College Hill in Providence to Boston and then a smaller house on Wilson Street in Providence. Bannister was overlooked in American art historical studies and exhibitions after his death in 1901, until institutions like the National Museum of African Art returned him to national attention in the 1960s and 1970s.

== Biography ==
=== Early life ===
Bannister was born on November 2, 1828, in Saint Andrews, a settlement in the Colony of New Brunswick near the St. Croix River. His father, Edward Bannister, was born in Barbados. His mother, Hannah Bannister (née Alexander), was also born in colonial New Brunswick, according to Bannister, "a stone's throw of my birthplace on the banks of the St. Croix River." Hannah's parents were probably from Barbados. Although both of his parents were black, Bannister was sometimes identified as "Mulatto". At the time, this designation was based on skin color as perceived by the Census taker, and did not reflect self-identity or family history. (Note: Little is known about the Bannister family history. The Bannisters might have been related to the Black Loyalist communities that formed in Nova Scotia after the American Revolution: the Bannister name appears in the Book of Negroes, a 1783 list of evacuees from New York to present-day Canada.) Bannister's father died in 1832, so Edward and his younger brother William were raised by their mother. Early on, Bannister was apprenticed to a cobbler, but his drawing skill was already noted among his friends and family. Bannister credited his mother with igniting his early interest in art. She died in 1844, after which Bannister and his brother lived on the farm of the wealthy lawyer and merchant Harris Hatch. There, he practiced drawing by reproducing Hatch family portraits and copying British engravings in the family library.

Bannister and his brother found work aboard ships as mates and cooks for several months before immigrating to Boston, sometime in the late 1840s. In the 1850 US census, they are listed as living at the same boarding house, with the Revaleon family, and working as barbers. The brothers' role as barbers and status as mixed race gave them relatively high standing as middle-class professionals within Boston.

Although he aspired to work as a painter, Bannister had difficulty finding an apprenticeship or academic programs that would accept him, due to racial prejudice. Boston was an abolitionist stronghold, but it was also one of the most segregated cities in the US in 1860. Bannister would later express his frustration with being blocked from artistic education: "Whatever may be my success as an artist is due more to inherited potential than to instruction" and "All I would do I cannot ... simply for the want of proper training."

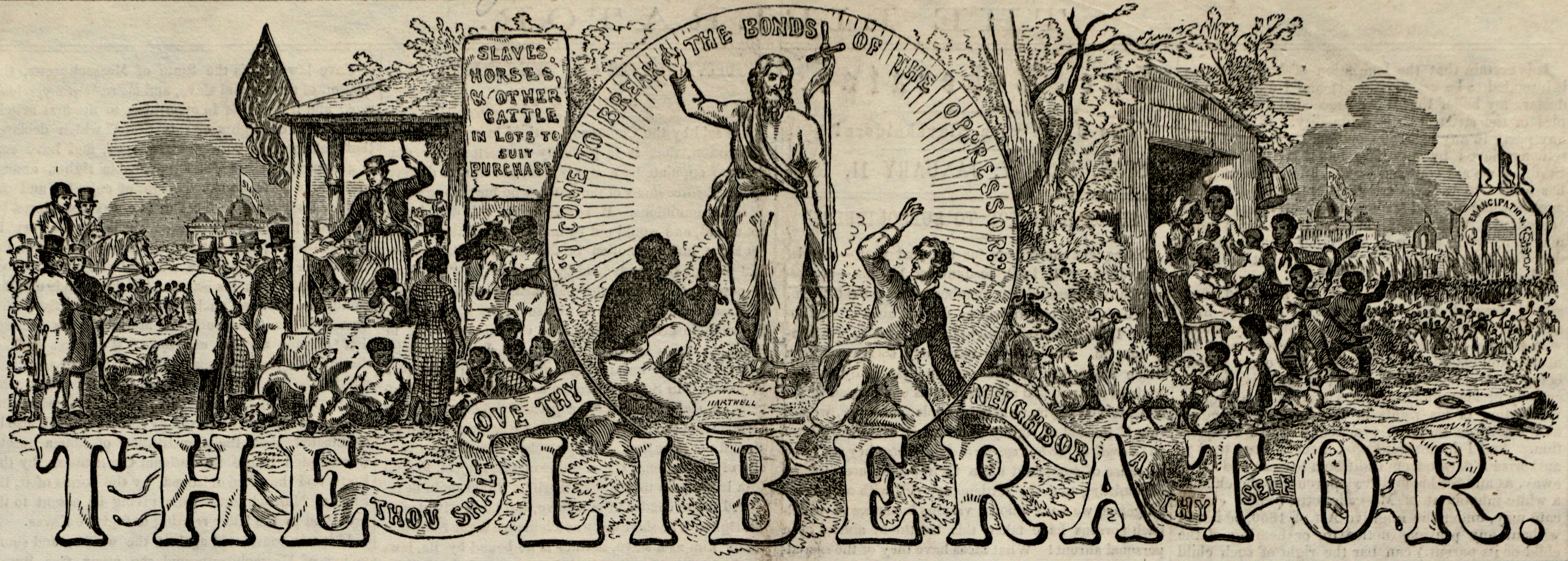
Masthead of The Liberator, 1861

Bannister received his first oil painting commission, The Ship Outward Bound, in 1854 from an African American doctor, John V. DeGrasse. Jacob R. Andrews, a gilder, painter, and member of the Histrionic Club, created the commission's gilt frame. DeGrasse later commissioned Bannister to paint portraits of him and his wife. Patronage like DeGrasse's was critical to Bannister's early career, as the African American community wanted to support and highlight its contributions to high culture. African Americans found portraiture an "ideal medium" for expressing their freedom and opportunity, which is probably why most of Bannister's earliest commissions are within that genre.

Through abolitionist newspapers like The Anglo-African and The Liberator and the writings of Martin R. Delany, Bannister likely learned about other African American artists like Robert S. Duncanson, James Presley Ball, Patrick H. Reason, and David Bustill Bowser. Their work would have made Bannister's ambition seem all the more possible. Although most cultural institutions barred Black Bostonians from entrance, Bannister would have had access to several, like the Boston Athenæum library, with collections of European art sources and exhibitions of Luminist marine painters like Robert Salmon and Fitz Hugh Lane.

=== Boston activist, artist, and student ===
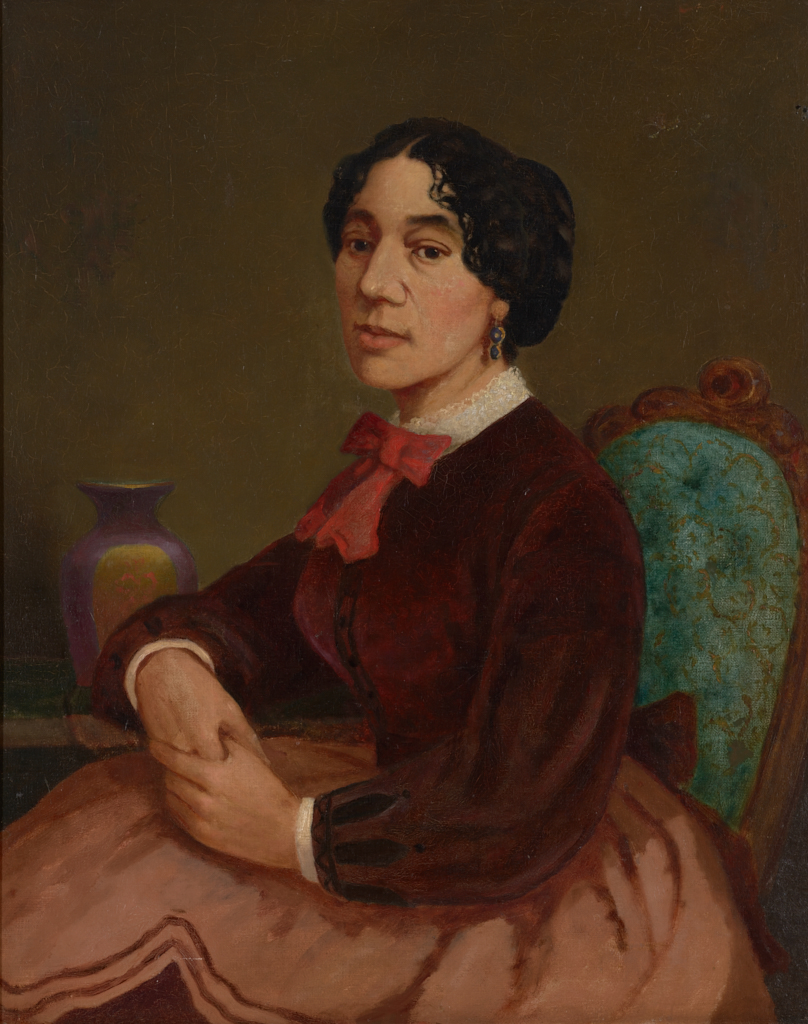
Portrait of Christiana Carteaux Bannister, Edward Mitchell Bannister, c. 1860

Bannister met Christiana Carteaux, a hairdresser and businesswoman born in Rhode Island to African American and Narragansett parents, in 1853 when he applied to be a barber in her salon. Both were members of Boston's diverse abolitionist movement, and barbershops were important meeting places for African American abolitionists. They married on June 10, 1857, and she became, in effect, his most important patron. The couple boarded for two years with Lewis Hayden and Harriet Bell Hayden at 66 Southac Street, a stop on Boston's Underground Railroad (a support network for escaped slaves).

In 1855 William Cooper Nell acknowledged Bannister's rising artistic status in The Colored Patriots of the American Revolution for his The Ship Outward Bound. Bannister also received encouragement to continue painting from artist Francis Bicknell Carpenter. By 1858, Bannister was listed as an artist in Boston's city directory. Around 1862, he spent a year training in photography in New York, likely to support his painting practice. He then found work as a photographer, taking solar plates and tinting photos. One of Bannister's earliest commissioned portraits was of Prudence Nelson Bell in 1864, which is around when he found studio space at the Studio Building in Boston. At the Studio Building, he came into contact with other prominent artists, like Elihu Vedder and John La Farge. Once Bannister was established as an artist, abolitionist William Wells Brown praised him in a 1865 book:

Mr. Bannister possesses genius, which is now showing itself in his studio in Boston; for he has long since thrown aside the scissors and the comb, and transfers the face to the canvas, instead of taking the hair from the head. [...] Mr. Bannister is spare-made, slim, with an interesting cast of countenance, quick in his walk, and easy in his manners. He is a lover of poetry and the classics, and is always hunting up some new model for his gifted pencil and brush.

Bannister was part of Boston's African American artistic community, which included Edmonia Lewis, William H. Simpson, and Nelson A. Primus. He sang as a tenor in the Crispus Attucks Choir, which performed anti-slavery songs at public events, and acted with the Histrionic Club, as well as serving as a delegate for the New England Colored Citizens Conventions in August 1859 and 1865. His name also appears on several public petitions published in The Liberator.

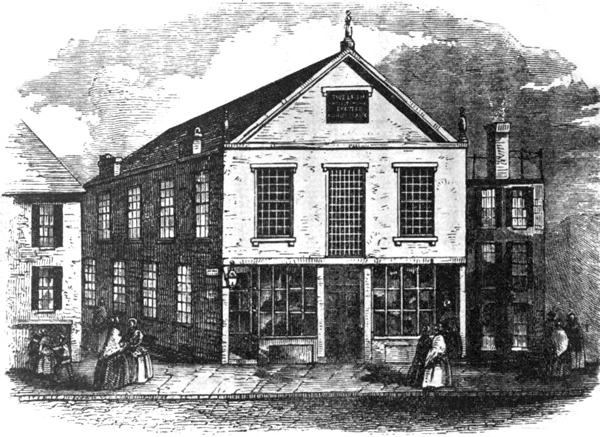
The Twelfth Baptist Church, where Bannister and Carteaux were members

Bannister and Carteaux were devout members of the militant abolitionist Twelfth Baptist Church, located on Southac Street near their home at the Hayden House. In May 1859, Bannister served as the secretary for the church's meetings to respond to the Oberlin–Wellington Rescue of imprisoned fugitive slaves and, in 1863, to plan celebrations for the Emancipation Proclamation.

During the US Civil War, Carteaux lobbied for equal pay for African American soldiers and organized the 1864 soldiers' relief fair for the Massachusetts 54th infantry regiment, 55th infantry regiment, and 5th cavalry regiment, which had gone without pay for over a year and a half. Bannister donated his full-length portrait of Robert Gould Shaw, the commander of the 54th killed in action, to raise money for the cause. Bannister's portrait of Gould Shaw was displayed with the label "Our Martyr", according to abolitionist Lydia Maria Child. The portrait was praised in the New York Weekly Anglo-African as "a fine specimen of art" and inspired a poem by Martha Perry Lowe entitled The Picture of Col. Shaw in Boston. The painting was purchased by the state of Massachusetts and installed in its state house, but its current location is unknown.

The Bannister portrait of Robert Gould Shaw was one of several memorials to Gould Shaw by members of Boston's African American artistic community such as Edmonia Lewis. These artworks, put to the practical purpose of raising money for Black soldiers, contradicted the ideals of Boston Brahmin abolitionists, such as the Gould Shaws. Although the Brahmins supported abolition, they saw it as an abstract good rather than a concrete cause in need of material support. The portrait's paternalistic praise from Lowe and Child exemplified the divide between Boston's white abolitionists and the African American community. Through art like the 1884 Robert Gould Shaw Memorial, the Boston Brahmins rejected the possessive "Our Martyr" label given to him by Black artists like Bannister and Edmonia Lewis.

Bannister's activism also took other forms: on June 17, 1865, Bannister marshaled around two hundred members of the Twelfth Baptist Sunday School at a Grand Temperance Celebration on Boston Common. They marched under a banner reading "Equal rights for all men".

Bannister eventually studied at the Lowell Institute with the artist William Rimmer, while Rimmer taught evening life drawing classes at the Institute between 1863 and 1865. Rimmer was known for his skill in artistic anatomy, an area Bannister knew was one of his weaknesses. Because of Bannister's daytime photography business, he mostly took his drawing classes at night. Through Rimmer and the community at the Studio Building, Bannister was inspired by the Barbizon School-influenced paintings of William Morris Hunt, who had studied in Europe and held public exhibitions in Boston around the 1860s. At the Lowell Institute, Bannister formed a lifelong friendship with painter John Nelson Arnold; both later became founding members of the Providence Art Club. Bannister also formed a temporary painting partnership with Asa R. Lewis that lasted from 1868 to 1869. During that partnership of "Bannister & Lewis", Bannister began to advertise himself as both a portrait and landscape painter.

Despite his early commissions, Bannister still struggled to receive wider recognition for his work due to racism in the US. Following emancipation and the end of the US Civil War, the abolitionists began to disperse and, with them, their patronage. Due to increasing competition, Bannister did little to support Primus, who had come to him seeking an apprenticeship. An article in the New York Herald belittled both Bannister and his work: "The negro has an appreciation for art while being manifestly unable to produce it." The article reportedly spurred his desire to achieve success as an artist. (Note: The headline and exact dating (c. 1867) of the New York Herald article is unknown, but this story is often repeated in sources. It is possible that the story is apocryphal. An early mention, during Bannister's lifetime, appears in Simmons 1887.) At the same time, Bannister had begun to receive more recognition within Boston art circles.

=== Providence ===
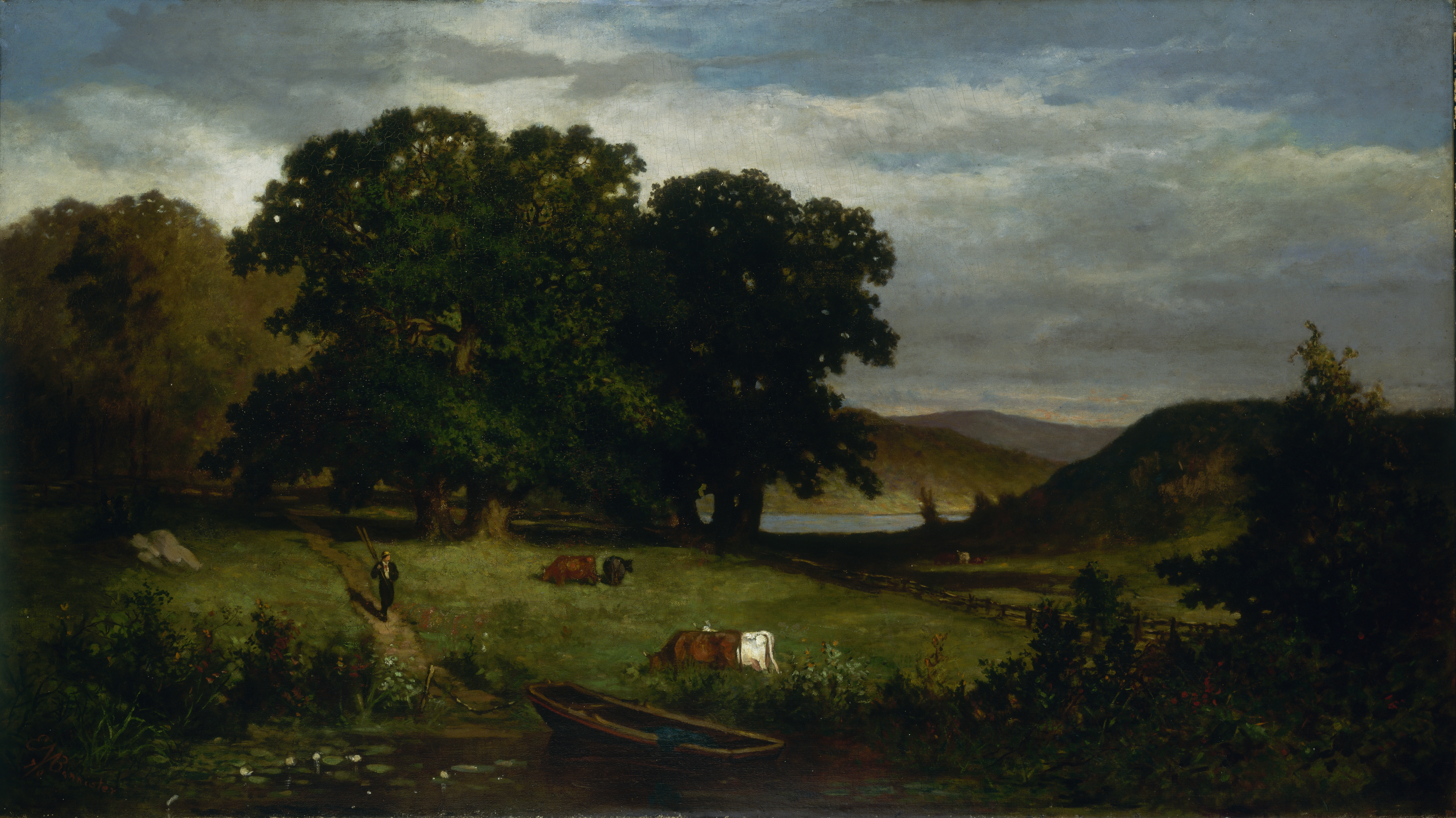
Painting completed around the time of Under the Oaks and thought to resemble its composition. Oak Trees, oil on canvas, 1876

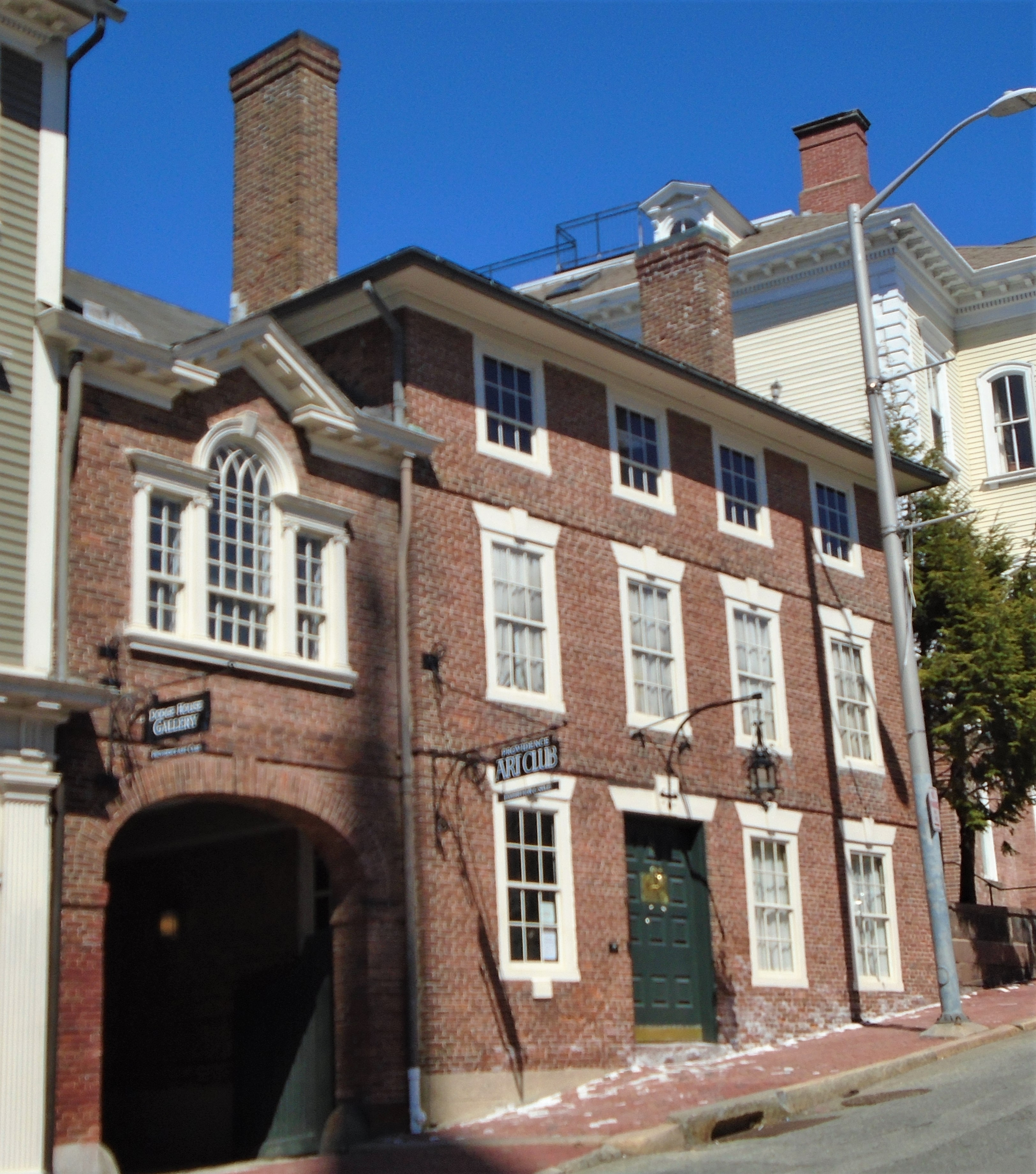
Facade of the Seril Dodge House at right, where the Providence Art Club was first permanently located in 1886

Supported by Carteaux, Bannister became a full-time painter in 1870, shortly after they moved to Providence, Rhode Island, at the end of 1869. He first took a studio in the Mercantile National Bank Building then moved to the Woods Building in Providence, where he shared a floor with artists like Sydney Burleigh and became friends with Providence painter George William Whitaker. He painted more landscapes over time—receiving an 1872 award at the Rhode Island Industrial Exposition for Summer Afternoon—and began submitting paintings to the Boston Art Club.

Bannister received national commendation for his work when he won first prize for his large oil Under the Oaks at the 1876 Philadelphia Centennial. (Note: The location of Under the Oaks is unknown. It was sold to John Duff of Boston for $1500, after the Centennial Exposition. Upon his death in 1880, he left his collection to his daughter Sibbel, wife of New York City physician William M. Bullard. She died in 1906, and in 1914 Bullard sold most of the collection. In 1910 journalist Elisha Jay Edwards tracked the painting down to Bullard's collection. In an 1876 issue of The Christian Recorder, professor J.P. Sampson described it as "a four by six feet picture, representing in the foreground, a herd of sheep along the [stream] while further in the back-ground is a beautiful ascent, with a cluster of oaks, wide spread in their branches, like a great shed; and beneath this shelter can be seen numerous cows and sheep taking shelter from the storm.") Even then, the judge wanted to rescind the award after learning his identity until other exhibition artists protested; afterwards, Bannister reflected: "I was and am proud to know that the jury of award did not know anything about me, my antecedents, color or race. There was no sentimental sympathy leading to the award of the medal." Bannister had intentionally submitted his painting with only a signature attached to ensure he would be judged fairly. As his career matured, he received more commissions and accumulated many honors, several from the Massachusetts Charitable Mechanics Association (silver medals in 1881 and 1884). Collectors and local notables Isaac Comstock Bates and Joseph Ely were among his patrons.

He was an original board member of the Rhode Island School of Design in 1878. In 1880 Bannister joined with other professional artists, amateurs, and art collectors to found the Providence Art Club to stimulate the appreciation of art in the community. Their first meeting was in Bannister's studio in the Woods Building at the bottom of College Hill. He was the second to sign the club's charter, served on its initial executive board, and taught regular Saturday art classes. He continued to show paintings at Boston Art Club exhibitions, as well as in Connecticut and at New York's National Academy of Design, and exhibited A New England Hillside at the New Orleans Cotton Exposition in 1885. There, Bannister's work was segregated and ignored by the judging committees. With that experience in mind, Bannister decided not to submit any works to the 1893 World's Columbian Exposition since they would have to be pre-judged in Boston before they could even be sent to Chicago.

In the 1880s Bannister bought a small sloop, the Fanchon, and spent summers sketching, painting watercolors, and sailing Narragansett Bay and up to Bar Harbor in Maine. He would return with his studies and use them as the basis for winter commissions. He supplemented his sailing trips with journeys to exhibitions in New York, but a planned trip to Europe fell through due to lack of money.

In 1885, with other art club members, Bannister helped found the Anne Eliza Club (or "A&E Club")—a communal men's discussion group named after the waitress at the Providence Art Club. Through his teaching there and at the Providence Art Club, he became a mentor to younger Providence artists, like Charles Walter Stetson. Stetson often mentioned Bannister in his personal diaries and once praised him by writing, "He is my only confidant in Art matters & I am his." Rhode Island engineer George Henry Corliss commissioned a painting from Bannister in 1886, as his reputation grew.

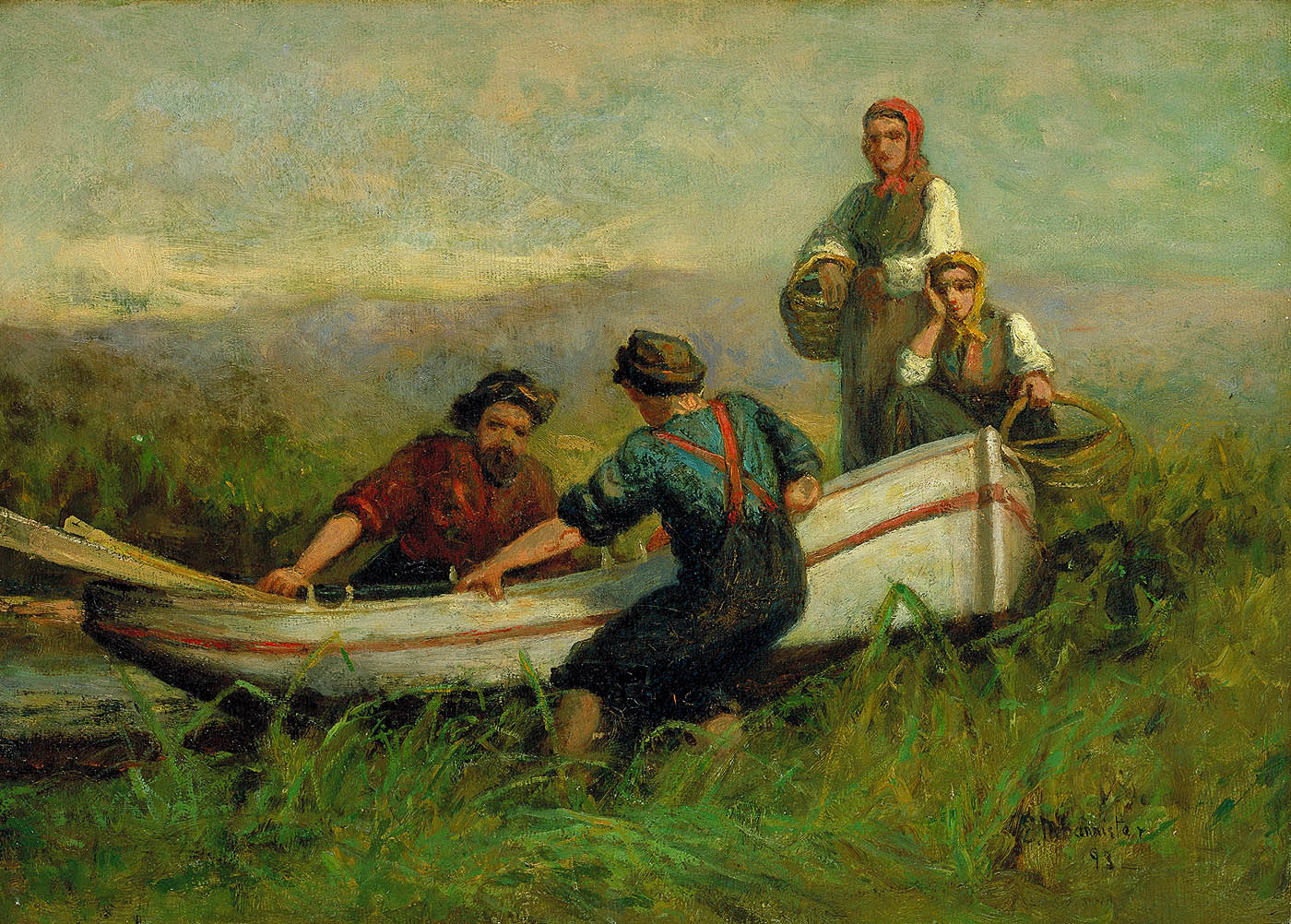
Art historians have suggested that the figure at left might be a Bannister self-portrait. People Near Boat, Edward Mitchell Bannister, 1893, oil on canvas

Bannister and Carteaux were consistent members of the African American community in Providence. They lived for a time in the boarding house of Ransom Parker, who had participated in the Dorr Rebellion, and were friends with merchant George Henry, Reverend Mahlon Van Horne, Brown graduate John Hope, and abolitionist George T. Downing, an ally from the Bannisters' political work in Boston. Carteaux founded the Home for Aged Colored Women, which is known as the Bannister Center today. Edward exhibited his painting Christ Healing the Sick in the home in 1892 and donated his portrait of Carteaux to it as well. Although he was a respected member of the Providence Art Club, Bannister's abolitionism likely led to conflict with its mostly white members, who exhibited art with minstrel stereotypes by E. W. Kemble and W. L. Shephard in 1887 and 1893.

Around 1890, Bannister sold the Fanchon to Judge George Newman Bliss. His largest exhibition of works was held in 1891, when he showed 33 works at the Spring Providence Art Club Exhibition. Later in the 1890s, Bannister seems to have sold fewer paintings, perhaps due to waning popularity, and exhibited less often. In 1898 Bannister closed his studio and the couple moved to Boston for a year before returning to a smaller home on Wilson Street, Providence, in 1900.

=== Death ===
Bannister died of a heart attack on January 9, 1901, while attending an evening prayer meeting at his church, Elmwood Avenue Free Baptist Church. He had experienced heart trouble for some time but had completed two paintings only the previous day. During the service, he offered a prayer and shortly after sat down, gasping. His last words were reportedly "Jesus, help me".

After his death the Providence Art Club held a memorial exhibition in his name that focused on his artistic achievements, without mentioning his contribution to abolitionism. In the exhibition pamphlet, they wrote: "His gentle disposition, his urbanity of manner, and his generous appreciation of the work of others, made him a welcome guest in all artistic circles. [...] He painted with profound feeling, not for pecuniary results, but to leave upon the canvas his impression of natural scenery, and to express his delight in the wondrous beauty of land and sea and sky."

He is buried in the North Burial Ground in Providence, under a stone monument designed by artist Mahler B. Ryder, RISD Illustration professor, and colleagues. In 1975, upon finding Bannister's marker damaged beyond repair, Ryder led a fundraising and design campaign to create a new monument, which stands today. The original marker was placed by Bannister's friends upon his death. The disparity between Bannister's financial difficulties at the end of his life and the support shown by Providence's artists after his death led his friend John Nelson Arnold to say about the memorial: "In the labor incident to this work I was constantly reminded of the remark attributed to the mother of Robert Burns on being shown the splendid monument erected to the memory of her gifted son: 'He asked for bread and they gave him a stone.'".

Carteaux was admitted to her Home for Aged Colored Women in September 1902; she died in 1903 in a state mental institution in Cranston. She and Bannister are buried together.

== Artistic style ==
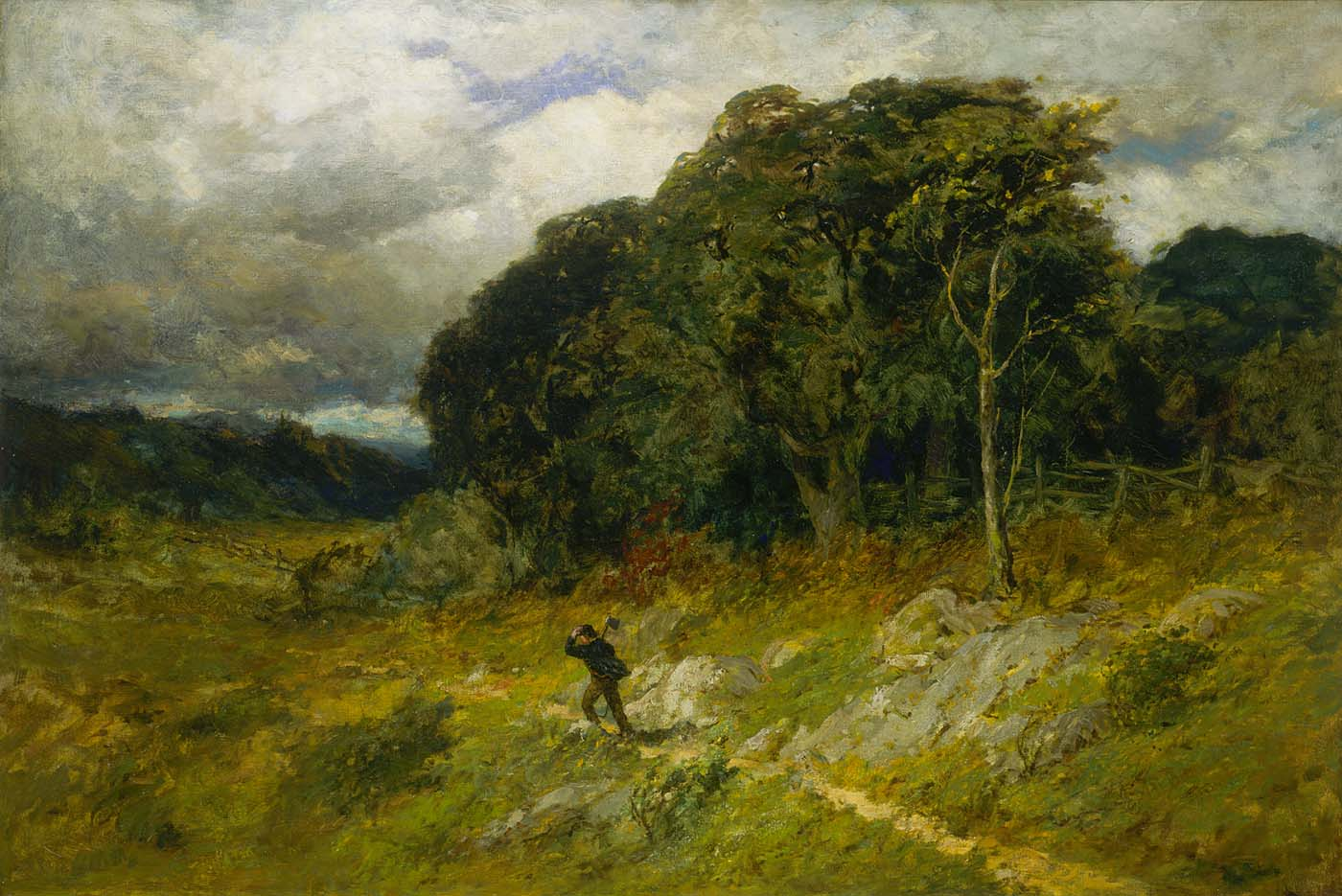
Approaching Storm, Edward Mitchell Bannister, 1886, oil on canvas, 102.2 cm x 152.4 cm

The young Bannister advertised himself as a portraitist, but later became popular for his landscapes and seascapes. Drawing on his knowledge of poetry, classics, and English literature as an autodidact, he also painted biblical, mythological, and genre scenes. Much like George Inness, his work reflected the composition, mood, and influences of French Barbizon painters Jean-Baptiste-Camille Corot, Jean-François Millet, and Charles-François Daubigny. Defending Millet in The Artist and His Critics, Bannister saw him as the most "spiritual artist of our time" who voiced "the sad, uncomplaining life he saw about him—and with which he sympathized so deeply."

Historian Joseph Skerrett has noted the influence of the Hudson River School on Bannister, while maintaining that he consistently experimented throughout his career: "Bannister managed to please a conservative New England taste in art while continuing to try new methods and styles." For their mutual affinity with the Hudson River School, Bannister has been compared to his contemporary, the Ohio-based African American painter Robert S. Duncanson. Unlike Hudson River School artists, Bannister did not create meticulous landscapes but paid more attention to creating "massive but revealing shapes of trees and mountains" and works more picturesque than sublime. Bannister also avoided the "nationalist grandeur" often found in Hudson River School paintings.

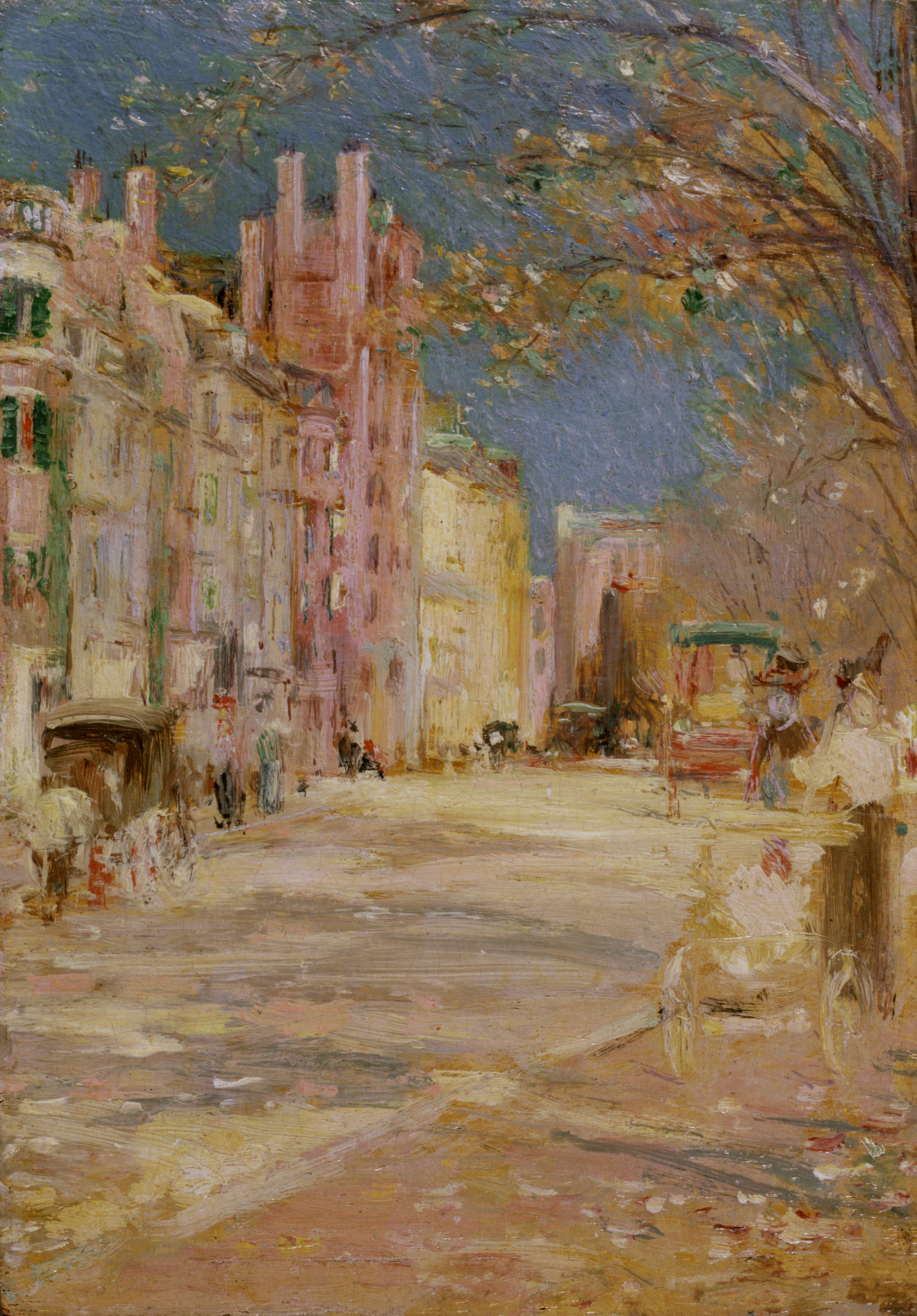
Boston Street Scene (Boston Common), (1898–99). The Walters Art Museum.

Bannister often made pencil or pastel studies in preparation for larger oil paintings. Several of his compositions refer to classical, mathematical methods like the Golden Ratio or "Harmonic Grid", and make careful use of symmetry and asymmetry. In other paintings, his contrast of darks and lights create dynamic diagonals or circles that divide the composition. His paintings are known for their delicate use of color to depict shadow and atmosphere and their loose brushwork. His later palette exhibited lighter, more muted colors: the Boston Common scene he painted late in his life is a notable example. This change in style stands in contrast to his earlier stated disapproval of Impressionist painting.

Art historian Traci Lee Costa has argued that a "reductive" emphasis on Bannister's biography has taken attention away from scholarly analysis of his artwork. In the lecture The Artist and His Critics given to the Anne Eliza Club on April 15, 1886, and published afterward, Bannister spelled out his belief that making art is a highly spiritual practice—the pinnacle of human achievement. In its nearly religious approach and focus on subjective representations of nature, Bannister's philosophy has been compared to both German Idealism and American Transcendentalism. In his lecture, Bannister referenced the works of American Transcendentalist Washington Allston. Bannister's friend George W. Whitaker referred to him as "The Idealist" in a 1914 article "Reminiscences of Providence Artists". The lecture and its idealistic view are linked to Bannister's Approaching Storm (see right), which he completed in the same year. Approaching Storm features a human figure at its center, which is nonetheless rendered small by the surrounding landscape. Despite the implied drama, Bannister used a cool color palette of blues and greens, with contrasting yellows that provide warmth against the darker, almost purple sky. The contrast of melancholy elements against more cheerful pastoral themes appears in many of Bannister's paintings.

Although committed to freedom and equal rights for African Americans, Bannister did not often directly represent those issues in his paintings. The farms that Bannister painted were reminders of southern Rhode Island's history of chattel slavery, unlike French Barbizon scenes. In Hay Gatherers, Bannister depicts African American field laborers in a rural landscape. Unlike Bannister's idyllic pastorals, Hay Gatherers represents racial oppression and labor exploitation in Rhode Island, particularly South County where most of the state's plantations were. The women workers are separated from the field of wildflowers at the painting's lower left and other field workers in the background by stands of trees, suggesting their closeness to freedom even while they are still within the grasp of plantation labor. Through the geometric composition of Hay Gatherers, which divides the figures and the landscapes into triangular sections, Bannister combined his work on seemingly idealized landscapes with his earlier political art, visible in his humanist portraits such as Newspaper Boy. Bannister's Fort Dumpling, Jamestown, Rhode Island uses a similar triangular composition, whereby people relaxing are juxtaposed against but separated from sailboats in the background, a reminder of the "maritime legacy of slavery".

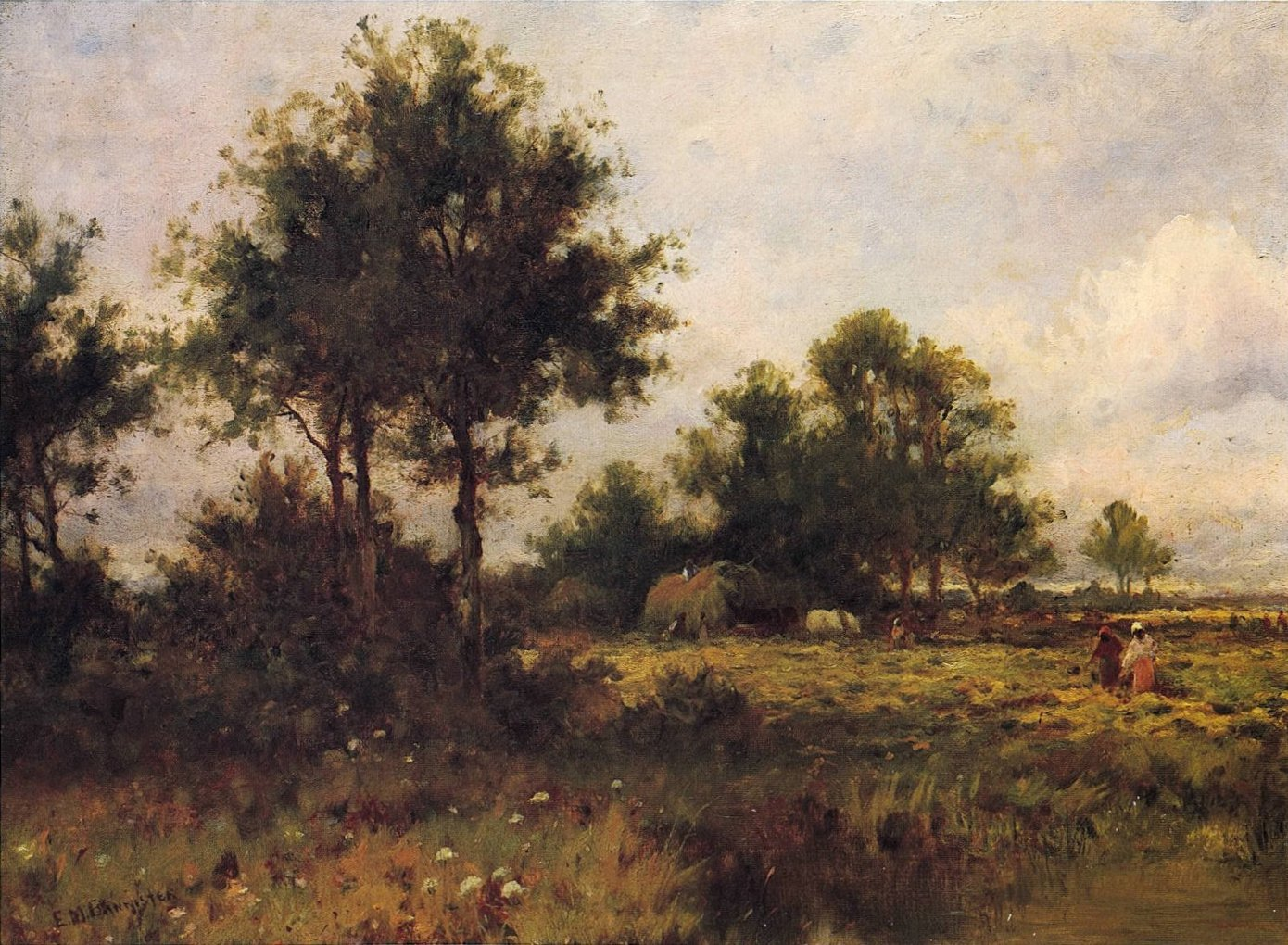
Hay Gatherers, Edward Mitchell Bannister, c. 1893

Bannister often conveyed political meaning in his paintings through allegory and allusion. One of his first commissions, The Ship Outward Bound, might have been a veiled reference to the forced return of Anthony Burns to slavery and Virginia under the Fugitive Slave Act of 1850 in 1854. In African American culture, an image of a ship leaving harbor was a reminder of the Transatlantic Slave Trade. Bannister's 1885 drawing The Woodsman is thought to be Bannister's response to the murder of Amasa Sprague, an event that spurred the abolition of capital punishment in Rhode Island after the dubious conviction and hanging of John Gordon. Similarly, his Governor Sprague's White Horse depicted the horse that William Sprague IV rode into the First Battle of Bull Run.

Bannister has been criticized for not often directly representing African Americans, outside of his early portraiture. He and artists like Henry Ossawa Tanner were deemed inauthentic during the Harlem Renaissance for producing works that appealed to white aesthetics. Many of Bannister's works were commissioned landscapes and portraits that reinforced European ideas, even though his art subtly dismantled racial stereotypes. In that way, Bannister has been compared to later Bostonian poet William Stanley Braithwaite, whose writing did not clearly reflect his identity. Bannister's work reflected his desire to excel and contribute to racial uplift, while still needing to depend on white patronage to reach a wider audience. Art historian Juanita Holland wrote of Bannister's dilemma: "This was a large part of the double bind that [Boston's] black artists faced: they needed to both address and represent an African American identity, while finding a way for their white viewers to look past race to a perception of the work in more universal terms."

== Legacy ==
Bannister was the only major African American artist of the late nineteenth century who developed his talents without European exposure; he was well known in the artistic community of Providence and admired within the wider East Coast art world. After his death, he was largely forgotten by art history for almost a century, principally due to racial prejudice. His art was often omitted from 20th-century art histories, and his style of melancholic, serene landscapes also fell out of fashion. Still, he and his paintings are an indelible part of a refigured relationship between African American culture and the landscapes of Reconstruction-era America.

Bannister's art continued to be supported by galleries like the Barnett-Aden Gallery and the Art Institute of Chicago. Following the civil rights movement in the 1960s, his work was again celebrated and widely collected. In collaboration with the Rhode Island School of Design and the Frederick Douglass Institute, the National Museum of African Art held an exhibition titled Edward Mitchell Bannister, 1828–1901: Providence Artist in 1973. The Rhode Island Heritage Hall of Fame inducted Bannister in 1976, and Rhode Island College created the Bannister Gallery in 1978 with an inaugural exhibition Four from Providence : Bannister, Prophet, Alston, Jennings.

The New York-based Kenkebala Gallery held two exhibitions of Bannister's work, one in 1992 curated by Corrinne Jennings in collaboration with the Whitney and one in 2001 on the centennial of Bannister's death. From June 9 to October 8, 2018, the Gilbert Stuart Museum held an exhibition honoring Bannister and Carteaux's relationship, "My Greatest Successes Have Come Through Her": The Artistic Partnership of Edward and Christiana Bannister, as part of its Rhode Island Masters exhibition series. Bannister's portrait of Christiana Carteaux was the center of the exhibition.

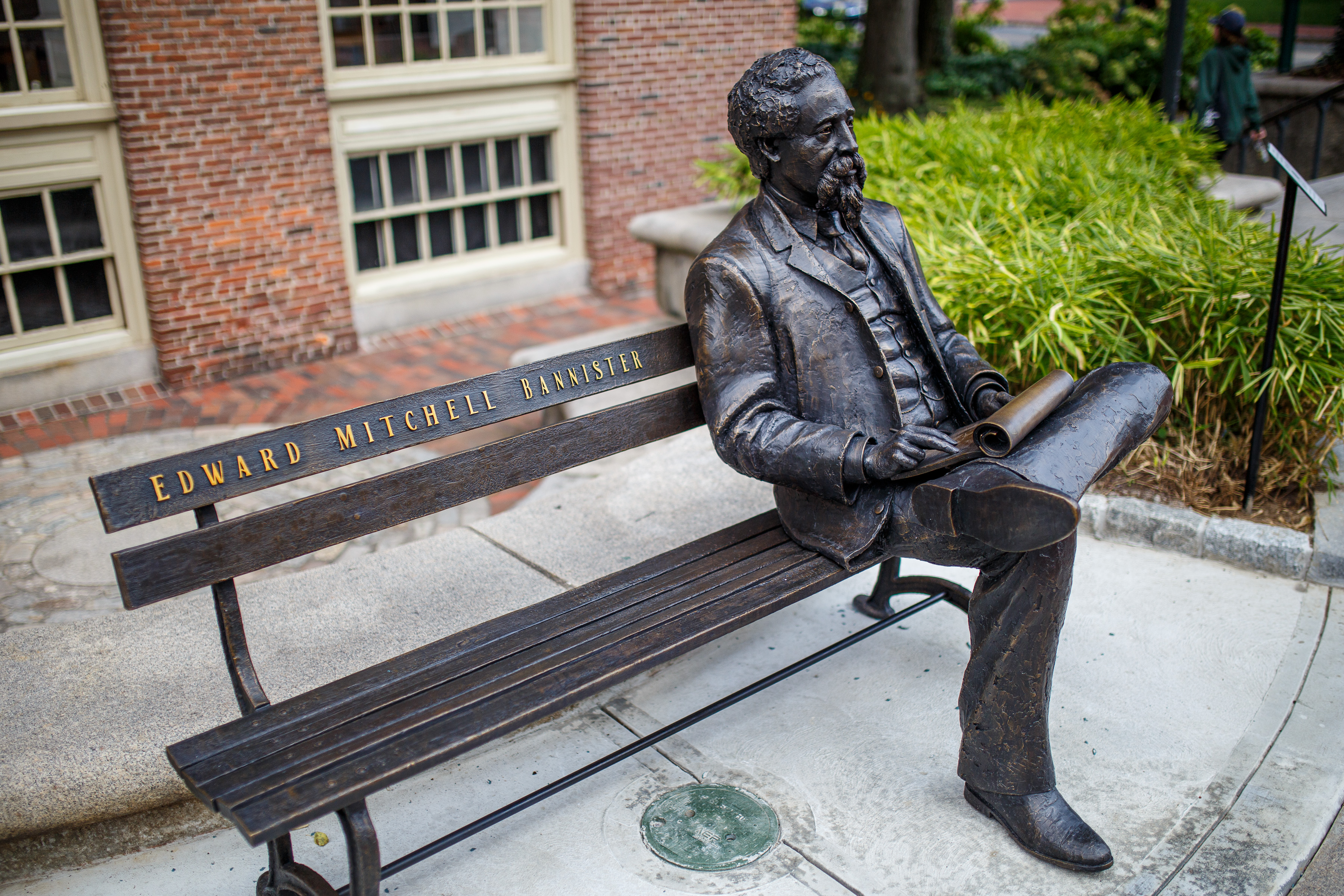
Bannister statue in Providence's Market Square

In September 2017, a Providence City Council committee unanimously voted to rename Magee Street (which had been named after a Rhode Island slave trader) to Bannister Street, in honor of Edward and Christiana Bannister. The Providence Art Club unveiled a bronze bust of Bannister made by Providence artist Gage Prentiss in May 2021. As of 2018, art historian Anne Louise Avery is compiling the first catalogue raisonné and a major biography of Bannister's work.

In September 2023, a bronze sculpture of Bannister by artist Gage Prentiss was unveiled in Providence's Market Square. Bannister is depicted in life size, sitting on a bench.

== House ==
In 1884 Bannister and Carteaux moved from the boarding house of Ransom Parker to 93 Benevolent Street, and lived there until 1899. The two-and-a-half-story wooden house was built circa 1854 by engineer Charles E. Paine and is now known as "The Vault" or "The Bannister House". Euchlin Reeves and Louise Herreshoff purchased the house in the late 1930s and renovated it to add a brick exterior. The renovation was made to create consistency with their next-door property, so both houses could hold their "little museum" of antiques. Herreshoff died in 1967 and the porcelain collection filling the Bannister House was donated to Washington and Lee University.

The house is now listed as contributing to College Hill's historical designation. Brown University bought the property in 1989 and used it to store refrigerators. Due to a lack of plans for its preservation and use, the Providence Preservation Society put the Bannister House on its 2001 list of most endangered buildings in Providence. Brown University president Ruth Simmons assured historian and former Rhode Island deputy secretary of state Ray Rickman that the house would be preserved, although the university debated whether to sell the house to a third party.

Because its disrepair and long disuse made the house unsuitable for residence, Brown renovated the property in 2015 and restored it to its original appearance. It was sold in 2016 as part of the Brown to Brown Home Ownership Program—the program specifies that if the house is ever sold, it has to be sold back to the university.

== Selected artworks ==
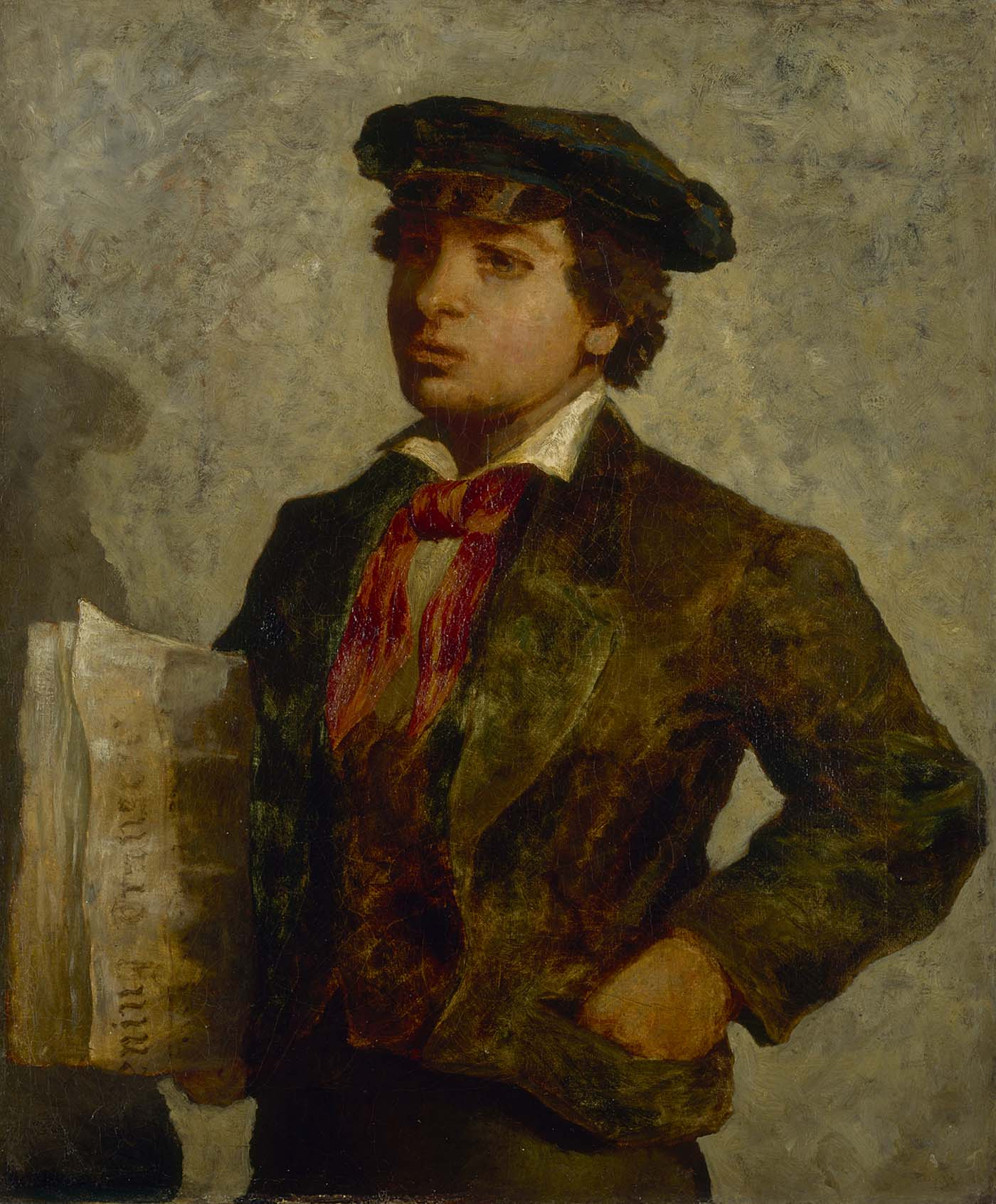
Newspaper Boy, 1869, oil on canvas, Smithsonian American Art Museum

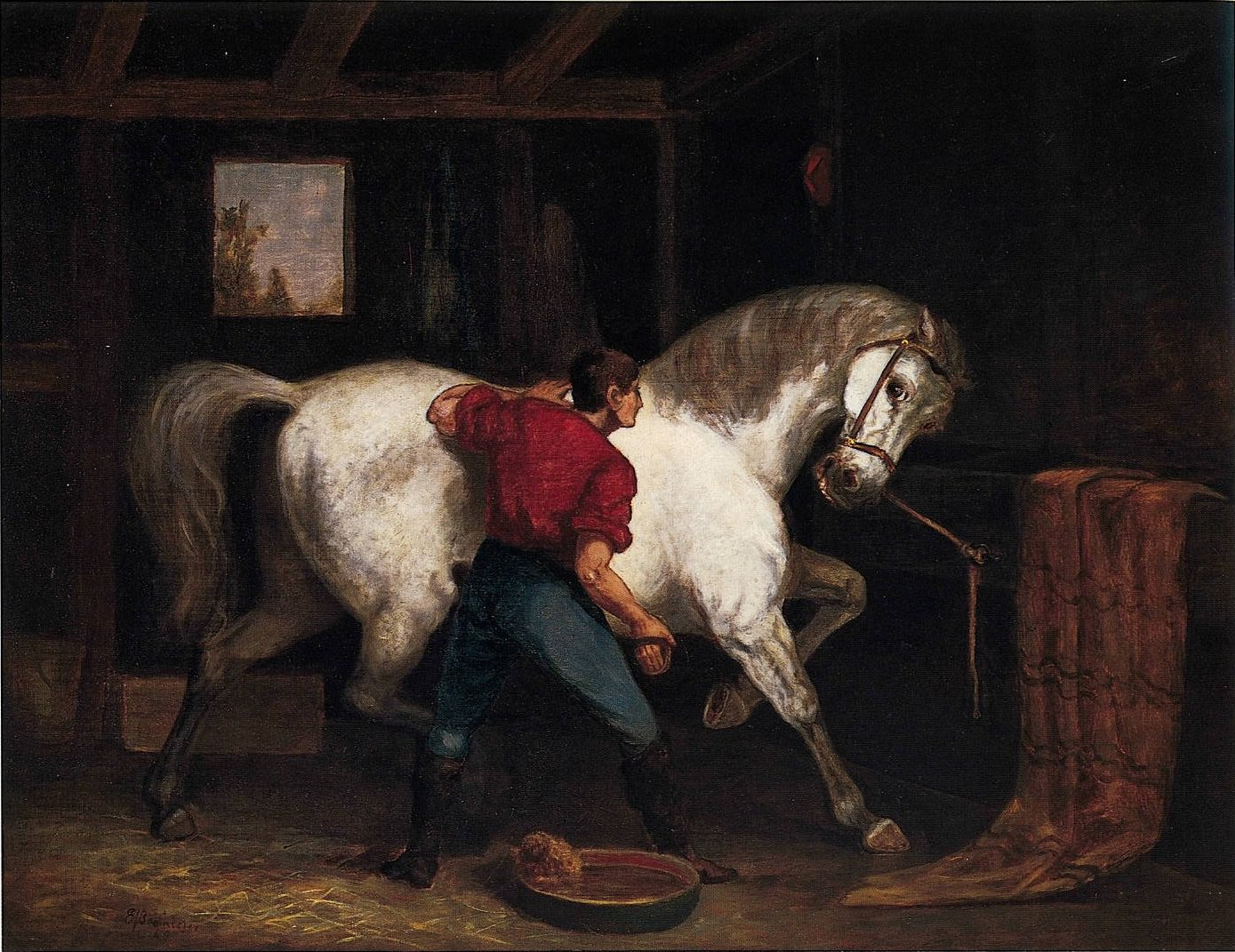
Governor Sprague's White Horse, 1869, oil on canvas, Rhode Island Historical Society

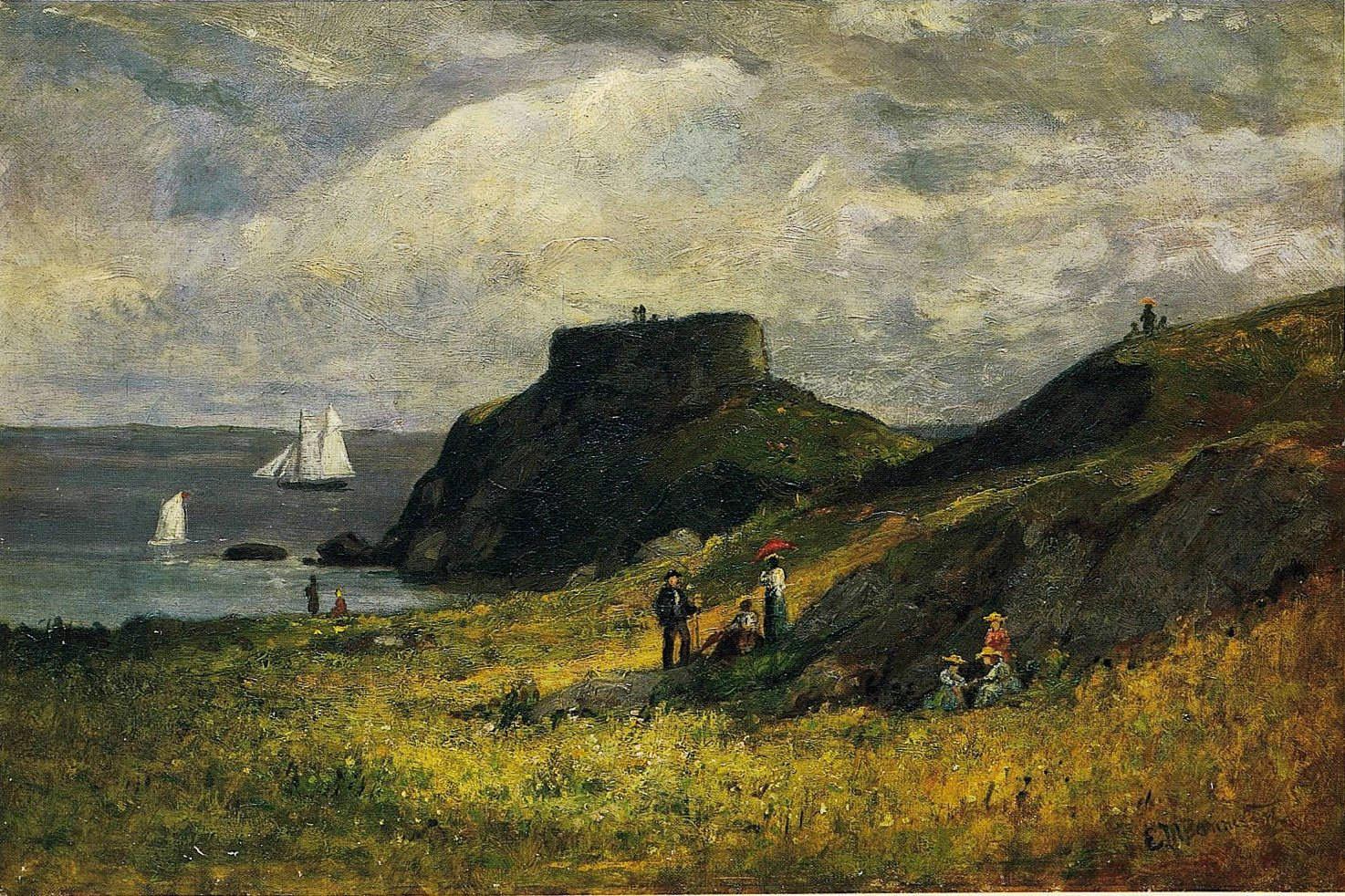
Fort Dumpling, Jamestown, Rhode Island, c. 1890, private collection

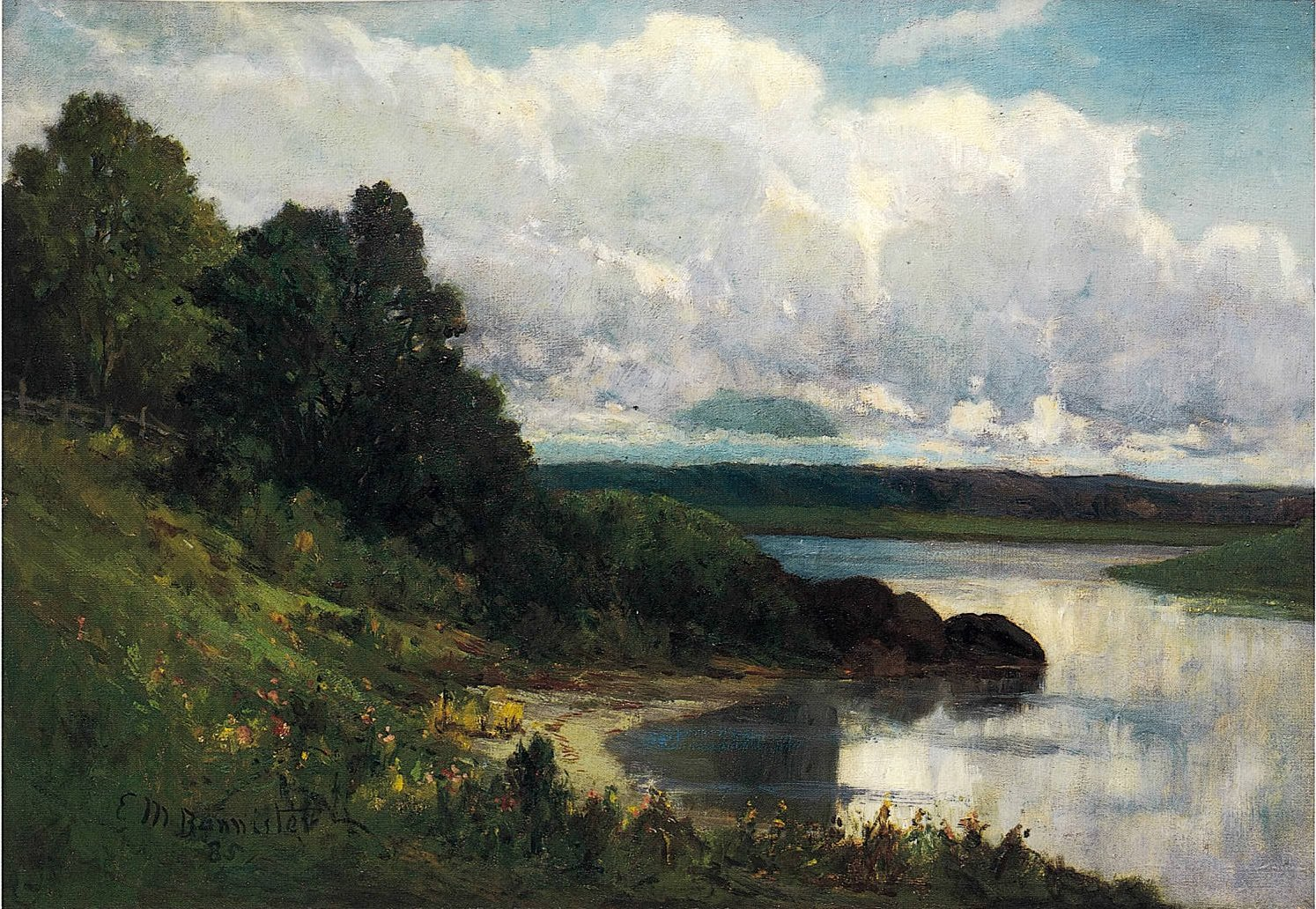
Palmer River, 1885, oil on canvas, private collection

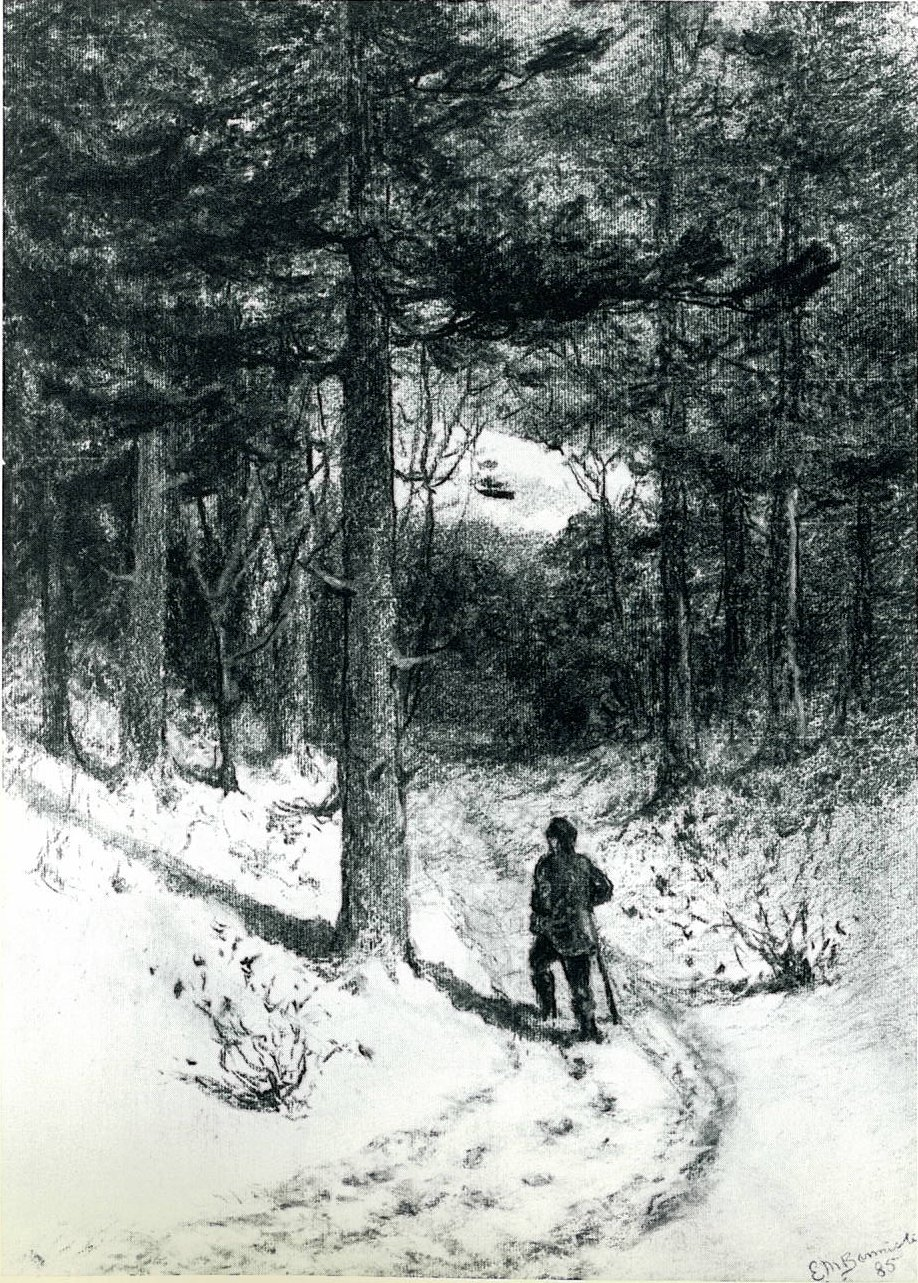
The Woodsman, 1885, graphite, Providence Art Club

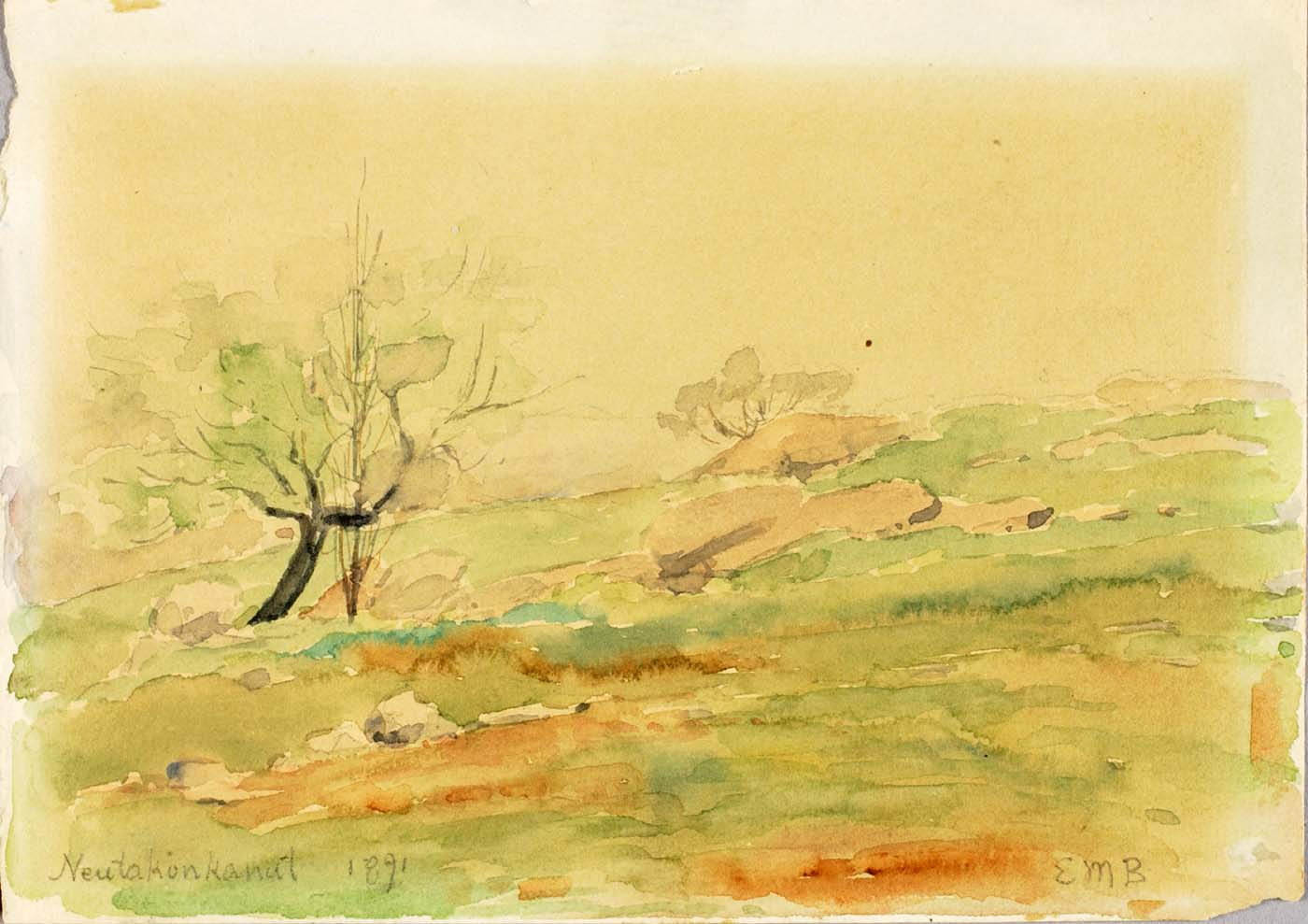
Neutakonkanut, 1891, watercolor, Smithsonian American Art Museum
