= Elias Lyman Magoon =

Elias Lyman Magoon (October 20, 1810 – November 25, 1886) was an American clergyman and religious writer.

Magoon was born in Lebanon, New Hampshire, on October 20, 1810. His father was Elder Josiah Magoon of New Hampton, and two of his brothers were Martin L., who died at Medford, Mass., in 1831, and Capt. John C. Magoon of Medford. He prepared for college at New Hampton, and graduated about 1834. He was an active member of the Literary Adelphi. He held pastorates in prominent churches in Richmond, Cincinnati, New York, Albany, and Philadelphia. He was a pastor continuously for about forty-six years, and continued in the work until a few months before his death. He was an author of a number of books, including: "Orators of the American Revolution", "Living Orators of America", "Proverbs for the People", "Republican Christianity", and "Westward Empire". He also frequently wrote in Baptist journals under the name "ELM". He trained numerous preachers, including Theodore Doughty Miller.

Magoon died November 25, 1886, in Philadelphia, Pennsylvania, at the age of seventy-six.
