= Peter Randolph (minister) =

African-American minister

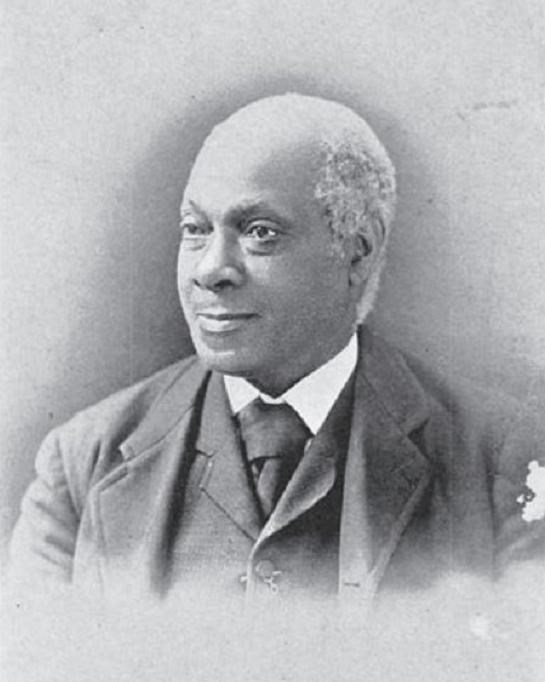
Peter Randolph pictured in 1893

Rev. Peter Randolph (c. 1825 – August 7, 1897) was an African-American minister and abolitionist. Born into slavery in Virginia, he was freed in the will of his owner but this request took three years and legal proceedings to be honored. Randolph moved to Boston after being freed, where he became a pastor. He spent four years in Richmond, Virginia, after the end of the Civil War, before moving back to Boston. Randolph published an autobiographical account of his life that went through several editions.

== Biography ==
Peter Randolph was born c. 1825 in Prince George County, Virginia, on the Brandon Plantation. He was enslaved upon birth and owned by Carter H. Edloe, who also held his mother and four or five siblings in bondage. Randolph's father was enslaved on a nearby plantation, and died when Randolph was approximately ten. Edloe had written a will directing that upon his death his slaves be freed and land he owned be sold, in part to pay his debts, but also to finance sending his former slaves to whichever state or colony they sought. Edloe's wishes were initially ignored by the executor of his will after he died in 1844. However, Randolph, who was Edloe's only literate slave, read the will and began legal proceedings to fight for his freedom and that of Edloe's other slaves. Three years later, they were freed by the order of a judge. Although Edloe had promised them fifty dollars each in his will, they ended up receiving almost fifteen. Sixty-six former slaves sailed for Boston on September 5, 1847. They arrived ten days later. Randolph was twenty-seven years old at the time.

Aided in settling by the Massachusetts Anti-Slavery Society, Randolph initially lived in Beacon Hill, Boston, where he attended the Belknap Street Church, led by Leonard Grimes. He was an original member of the Twelfth Baptist Church and was later a preacher there. Randolph also preached around Boston, and in several other towns including New Haven, Connecticut (at a church from 1856 to 1857), and Newburgh, New York (from 1858 to sometime before 1861).

By 1861 Randolph was working at a newspaper in Boston and preaching. Randolph grew to become a vocal anti-slavery advocate as a member of the Massachusetts Anti-Slavery Society, donating money and otherwise aiding enslaved people seeking freedom. For instance, in 1852 Randolph visited Saint John, New Brunswick, where he did missionary work with fugitive slaves. He published an account of his experience with slavery, The Sketch of a Slave life, or, an illustration of the peculiar institution, in 1855, with the goal of showing "that slaves, when liberated, can take care of themselves, and need no master or overseer to drive them to their toil." The book was self published and forty-pages long. The work was promoted in The Boston Transcript by its editor Daniel Haskill, and a second edition was published that year. Its second edition, at eighty-two pages, was substantially longer.

Randolph's request to serve as a chaplain in the Union Army during the American Civil War was rejected because there were no open spots. About a month after the end of the war in 1865 he traveled to Virginia, first settling in City Point, Virginia, and later moving to Richmond, Virginia, where he was preacher of the Ebenezer Baptist Church. As the church's first African-American pastor, Randolph instituted several reforms including giving women a greater role. Randolph moved back to Boston after four years, founding the Ebenezer Baptist Church in 1871 to provide a space for African-Americans who had moved to Boston from the Southern United States to worship. Randolph published From Slave Cabin to the Pulpit. The Autobiography of Rev. Peter Randolph: the Southern Question Illustrated and Sketches of Slave Life, in 1893, a third edition of his earlier publication that was well over twice as long, with 220 pages. He worked at several churches around the Northeast during this time.

Randolph died on August 7, 1897, in Boston. An obituary published in The Boston Journal described him as holding "the record of founding and preaching over more Baptist churches than any other Baptist clergyman in New England."

== Legacy ==
According to an editor of a republication of From Slave Cabin to the Pulpit, Randolph's works have been "generally ignored by historians of slavery". They were analyzed in a 2003 article published in Religion & Literature.
