= Leonard Grimes =

African-American abolitionist and pastor

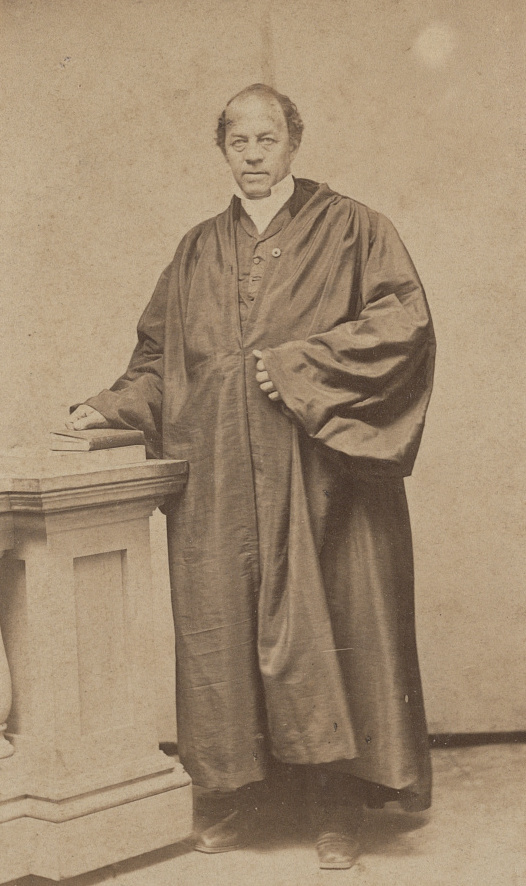
- Born: November 9, 1815; Leesburg, Virginia
- Died: March 14, 1873 (aged 57); Somerville, Massachusetts
- Occupations: Hackney driver, minister
- Known for: Underground Railroad; 54th Regiment Massachusetts Volunteer Infantry

Religious life
- Religion: Baptist

Leonard Andrew Grimes (November 9, 1815 – March 14, 1873) was an African-American abolitionist and pastor. He served as a conductor of the Underground Railroad, including his efforts to free fugitive slave Anthony Burns captured in accordance with the Fugitive Slave Act of 1850. After the Civil War began, Grimes petitioned for African-American enlistment. He then recruited soldiers for the 54th Regiment Massachusetts Volunteer Infantry.

== Abolitionism ==
Born of free parents in Leesburg, Virginia on or about November 9, 1815, he was orphaned about age 10 and sent to live with an uncle; unhappy there, he left and eventually headed to Washington, D.C.

Grimes was fortunate to grow up a free man, but because he was of mixed race, he identified as African American; witnessing the horrors of slavery in the south, he devoted his life to assisting fugitive slaves and advocating for abolition.

After moving to Washington, D.C., Grimes began a career as a hackney driver, providing transportation for people in and around Washington, D.C. Owning his own coach enabled him to serve as a conductor of the Underground Railroad for years without suspicion. He transported fugitive slaves from Virginia to Washington, D.C., and then assisted in moving them North. In 1839, Grimes was caught attempting to rescue a family of slaves from Virginia, and he was sentenced to two years in jail in Richmond. At this time his wife, Octavia Colston Grimes, taught a school for African American children in Washington.

In jail he found religion and after his release in 1840, Grimes was baptized in the Baptist faith and was licensed to preach by a panel chaired by the president of Columbian College, a Baptist institution in the District of Columbia (now the George Washington University). In 1846 he moved to Massachusetts and associated himself with the American Baptist Missionary convention in New Bedford, Massachusetts, and in Boston. In November 1848 he was ordained as pastor of the Twelfth Street Baptist church. He was pastor of the Twelfth Baptist Church for 27 years. Grimes actively opposed the Fugitive Slave Act, and his church became known as "The Fugitives Church." He became an important figure in national church organizations and at the American Baptist Missionary Society Convention at Philadelphia in 1858 he, along with Theodore Doughty Miller, William Spellman, and Sampson White, pushed the organization to oppose slavery. They voted to have no fellowship with slave-holding ministries. He was president of the American Baptist Missionary convention and the Consolidated Baptist conventions for several years.

== Case of Anthony Burns ==
Anthony Burns was an escaped slave from Virginia who came to Boston and became a member of Grimes's church in 1854. When Burns's former slaveholder discovered where Burns was living, he ordered his arrest. Grimes led a fierce effort to free Burns from jail, but the trial commenced, and the judge, in accordance with the Fugitive Slave Act, ruled that Burns was still property of his slaveholder. Grimes was able to raise enough funds to purchase Burns's freedom, and Burns was freed from his life of servitude. The Burns case was the last time that a fugitive slave was prosecuted under the Fugitive Slave Act in Massachusetts.

== Colored Conventions ==
Grimes was a delegate to the Colored Conventions Movement, including the 1853 convention in Rochester, the Colored National Convention of 1855 in Philadelphia, and the 1859 convention in Boston. Grimes also served as a member of the Massachusetts State Council, where he and other members advocated for opportunities for black Americans and for equal school rights.

== Massachusetts 54th Regiment ==
The 54th Regiment Massachusetts Volunteer Infantry was one of the first African-American regiments to serve in the Civil War, forming in 1863. Many members of Grimes's church wanted to fight for the Union, and Grimes lobbied for the establishment of an African-American regiment. When their efforts prevailed, Grimes recruited men to serve in the infantry.

== Death ==
Grimes took ill just after a meeting of the Home Mission Society and died of apoplexy March 14, 1873, at his home in East Somerville, Massachusetts, near Boston.

== Memorialization ==
On July 18, 2007, the George Washington University unveiled a plaque honoring Grimes on the site of his former home—the residence he owned from 1836 to 1846 at the corner of 22nd and H Streets NW, Washington, D.C., now in the center of GW's Foggy Bottom campus.

The National Park Service has designated the Loudoun County, Virginia, Courthouse as an Underground Railroad Network to Freedom site in part because of Grimes's trial and conviction there.
