= Christiana Carteaux Bannister =

American business entrepreneur, hairdresser, and abolitionist

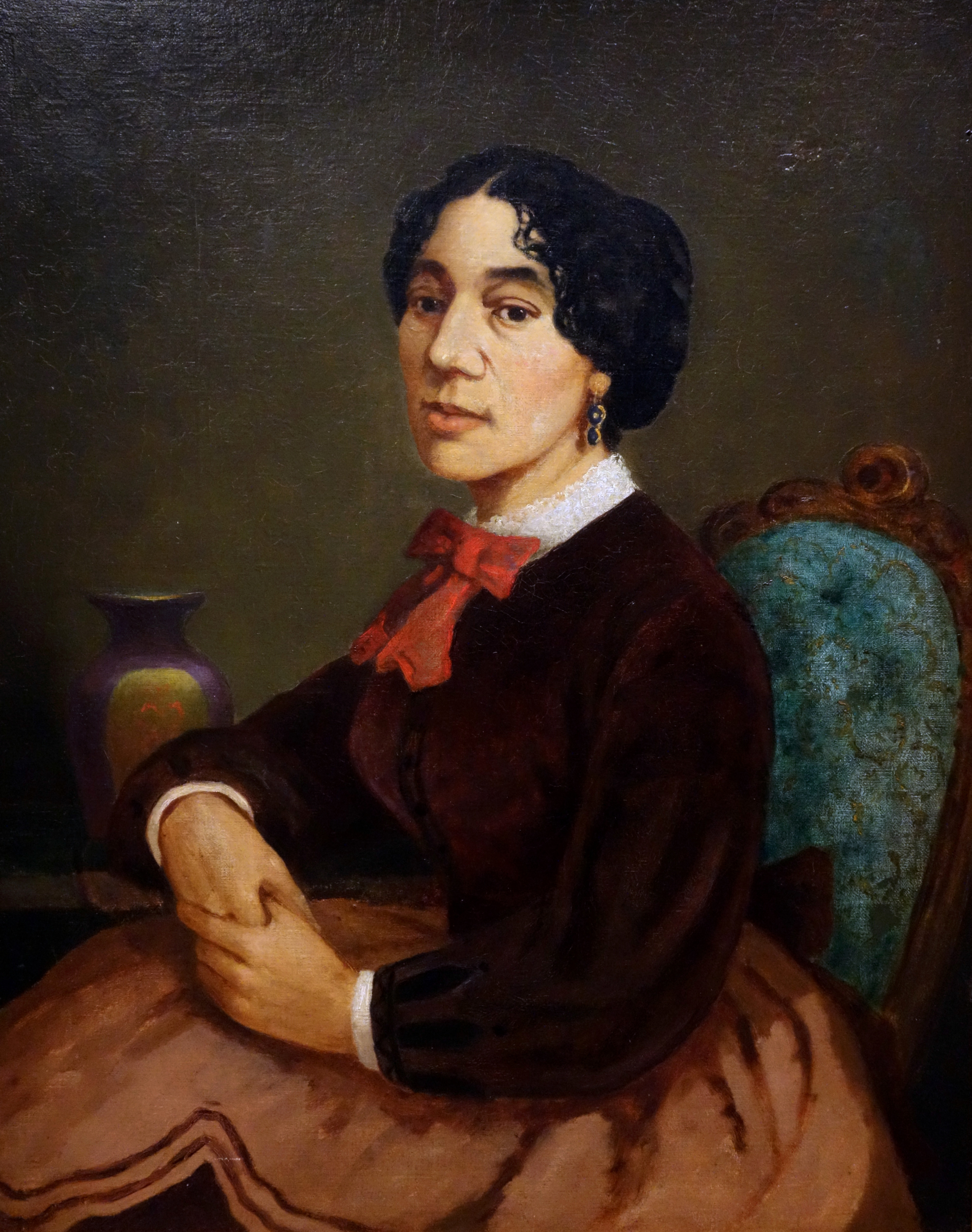
- Portrait by Edward Mitchell Bannister
- Born: Christina Babcock; 1819; North Kingstown, Rhode Island, US
- Died: 1902 (aged 82–83)
- Other name: Madame Carteaux
- Occupations: entrepreneur, hairdresser, and abolitionist
- Spouse: Edward Mitchell Bannister (m. 1857; died 1901)

Christiana Carteaux Bannister (née Babcock; 1819–1902) was an American business entrepreneur, hairdresser, and abolitionist in New England. She was known professionally as Madame Carteaux. Christiana was married to successful artist Edward Mitchell Bannister, who she supported financially during the early stages of his career. While Christiana's legacy has been overlooked in the past, coverage of her work in popular sources during the late 2010s has brought new attention to her success and political efforts.

== Biography ==
Christiana Carteaux Bannister was born in 1819 in North Kingstown, Rhode Island. She was born to African American and Narragansett Indian parents. She was a descendant of enslaved Africans who worked the plantations of South County, Rhode Island, during the eighteenth century. As a young woman, she moved to Boston where she worked as a wigmaker and hairdresser.

== Marriages ==
Christiana appears in the 1846 Boston directory listed as a milliner. Records also state that she had married Desiline Carteaux, a clothes dealer and cigar maker. Her marriage to Carteaux, who is believed to be of Caribbean origin, did not last. The two lived on Beacon Hill in Boston, but by 1850 they separated and Christiana lived with friends in Providence.

In 1853 Christiana and Edward Mitchell Bannister met when he applied for work as a barber in her Boston salon. She and Bannister married on June 10, 1857. Bannister became one of the most successful Black artists because of Christiana Carteaux Bannister's financial and emotional support. He attributed much of his success to Christiana for her critical eye and her business sense. In 1869, the Bannisters moved to Providence, Rhode Island, and Christiana continued her business as a hairdresser as well as her activism.

== Hairdressing business ==
As a young woman, Christiana moved from Rhode Island to Boston where she began her career as a wigmaker. She was professionally known as Madame Carteaux, Women's Hairdresser and Wigmaker. She was a successful business entrepreneur, and self-styled "hair doctress," generating income by hairdressing and selling her own hair products. From 1847 to 1871 Christiana Carteaux Bannister maintained several salons in Boston including on Cambridge, Washington, and Winter Streets. When Christiana Carteaux Bannister and Edward Bannister moved to Providence, she opened another salon in Providence.

== Abolitionists ==
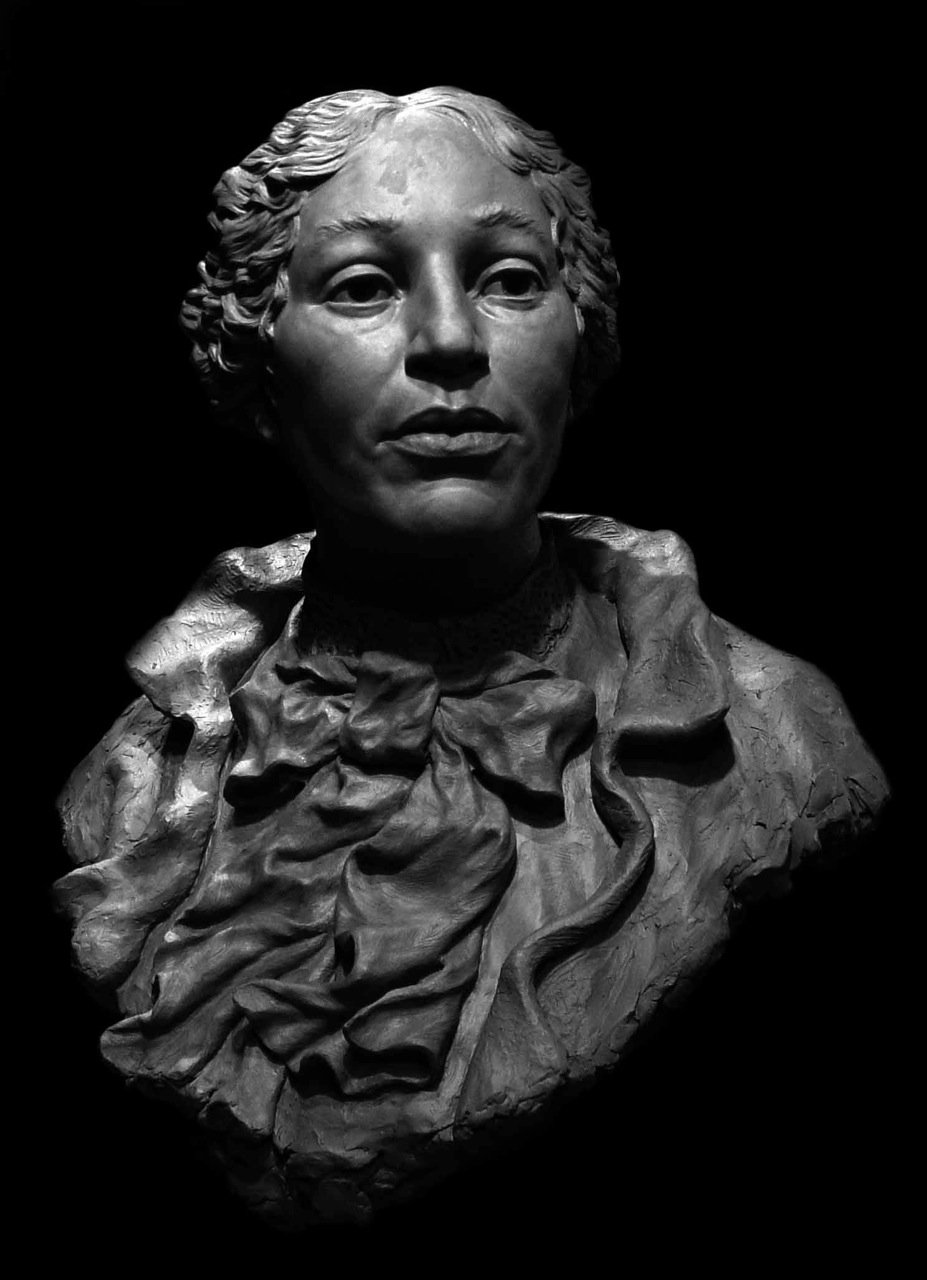
Bronze portrait bust State House, Providence, RI, 2002

While in Boston, the Bannisters lived and worked with abolitionist Lewis Hayden. The family participated in Lewis' facilitation of the Boston Underground Railroad, and providing their hair salons as meeting places for African American and white abolitionists.

== Other activism ==
During the Civil War, Christiana Carteaux Bannister was an advocate for equal pay for Black soldiers. In November 1864, she organized a fair sponsored by the Boston Colored Ladies Sanitary Commission to benefit the African American regiments, the 54th and 55th Massachusetts and the 5th Massachusetts Cavalry, who served for a year and a half without pay rather than accept less than the white soldiers were paid.

In Providence, she founded the Home for Aged Colored Women when she learned about the struggles of African American women who worked as domestics but were too old to work and often became homeless. The home moved from Transit St. to Dodge St. and was renamed Bannister House, Inc.

== Death and legacy ==
Despite her success throughout her professional life, Bannister died with little money in January 1903. Though she was admitted into the Home for Aged Colored Women in September 1902, Bannister reportedly lived with mental illness and was transferred to the Howard Asylum, Lancaster reported. Upon her death, she was laid to rest next to her husband, who died in January 1901 during a church prayer meeting, without a grave marker.

Many years after her death, she began to receive more public recognition for her contributions to society and Black history. Bannister was inducted into the Rhode Island Heritage Hall of Fame in 2003, and a bronze bust of her, based upon a portrait Edward painted, was placed in the Rhode Island State House in December 2002.
