= William Francis Channing =

American physician (1820–1901)

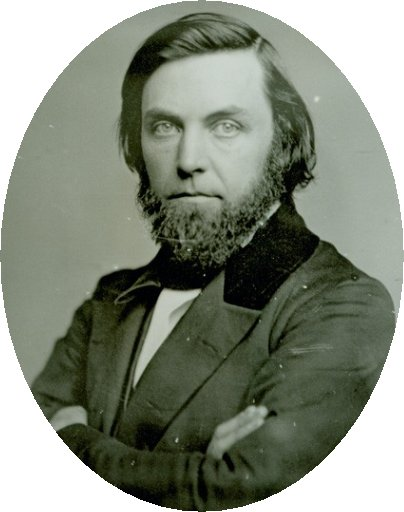
- Portrait of Channing in 1847
- Born: 22 February 1820; Boston, Massachusetts, U.S.
- Died: 19 March 1901 (aged 81); Boston, Massachusetts, U.S.
- Education: Harvard University, University of Pennsylvania
- Occupations: Physician, scientist, inventor
- Parent(s): William Ellery Channing; Ruth Gibbs
- Relatives: William Ellery (great-grandfather); William Ellery Channing (cousin); William Henry Channing (cousin)

William Francis Channing (February 22, 1820 – March 19, 1901) was an American physician, scientist, and abolitionist known for inventing the telegraph fire alarm system and contributing to the development of the telephone. He published books on medicine and electricity, and patented several inventions. Channing was also involved in Boston abolition activities including the Latimer Committee and the Boston Vigilance Committee.

== Early life and education ==
William Francis Channing was born to prominent Unitarian minister William Ellery Channing and wife Ruth Gibbs in Boston, on February 22, 1820. Like his father, Channing attended Harvard University, graduating in 1839. After graduation, he participated in the first geological survey of New Hampshire from 1841 to 1842. Channing continued his education at the University of Pennsylvania, earning a medical degree from the Perelman School of Medicine in 1844.

== Activism ==
In 1842, Channing formed the Latimer Committee along with Henry Ingersoll Bowditch and Frederick Samuel Cabot to advocate for the release of George Latimer, a man arrested in Boston after escaping slavery in Norfolk, Virginia. The committee published six editions of The Latimer Journal and North Star, and organized petitions to state and federal legislatures seeking to create laws preventing the state of Massachusetts from arresting escapees on behalf of slaveholders. The petition of 64,526 signatures to the Massachusetts state house was successful, leading to the “Latimer Law”, officially the 1843 Personal Liberty Act, which prohibited state officials from participating in the apprehension and detention of alleged fugitive slaves.

Channing was also a member of the third Boston Vigilance Committee, re-formed in response to the Fugitive Slave Act of 1850. He took over the position of Secretary for the committee after the death of Charles List in 1855.

A participant in Underground Railroad activities in Boston, Channing supported the party that attempted to forcibly free escaped slave Anthony Burns from jail. Following the courthouse riot in which marshal James Batchelder was shot and killed, Channing treated a severe cut to the face of Thomas Wentworth Higginson and transported Lewis Hayden out of town to the house of William Bowditch. Batchelder himself believed he had been stabbed, and doctor Charles Thomas Jackson described the mortal wound as being caused by a double-edged blade. However, Channing determined Hayden was responsible for the death of Batchelder by using a type of improvised slug in his pistol that could create a slicing wound.

In the wake of the failed Burns rescue, Channing joined other key Vigilance Committee members in organizing the Boston Anti-Man-Hunting League, which trained to confront slave catchers using violent methods and deter them from operating in the state.

== Science and inventions ==
Excited by the possibilities of electricity, Channing conducted research into its applications in the medical field and published several works on the topic, including co-authoring multiple editions of Davis’s Manual of Magnetism with Daniel Davis and Joseph Hale Abbot.

=== Fire-alarm telegraph ===
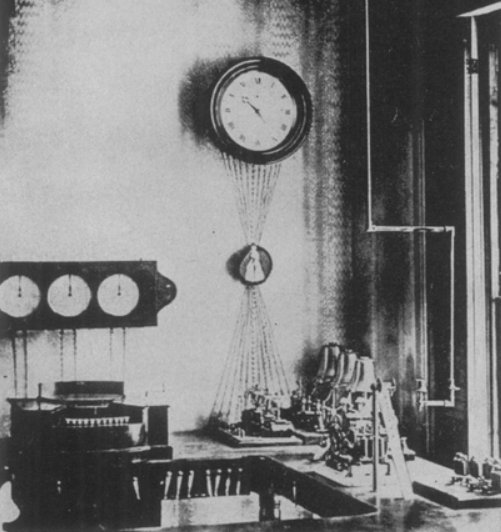
Fire-alarm system installed at Boston City Hall in 1852.

Inspired by the human nervous system, Channing conceived of a “municipal telegraph” as a method for organizing city functions, and identified firefighting as an immediate and important application. In 1845, Channing first published a description of a telegraph for the purposes of alerting city officials to a fire. He specified such a system would have mechanisms for distributed boxes to transmit coded information to a central location by telegraph, and provide circuits for the centralized office to relay messages to fire houses and initiate a response.

Channing worked with electrical engineer Moses G. Farmer to develop his proposed alarm system for the city of Boston. They demonstrated a prototype to the mayor in 1848. At Channing’s behest, the municipal government authorized a functioning system for $10,000 in 1851. The alarms were installed near city hall, and first activated on April 29, 1852, the day after completion. Channing and Farmer sold the distribution rights to John Gamewell in 1855, and received patent number 17,355 for the system in 1857.

=== Telephone ===
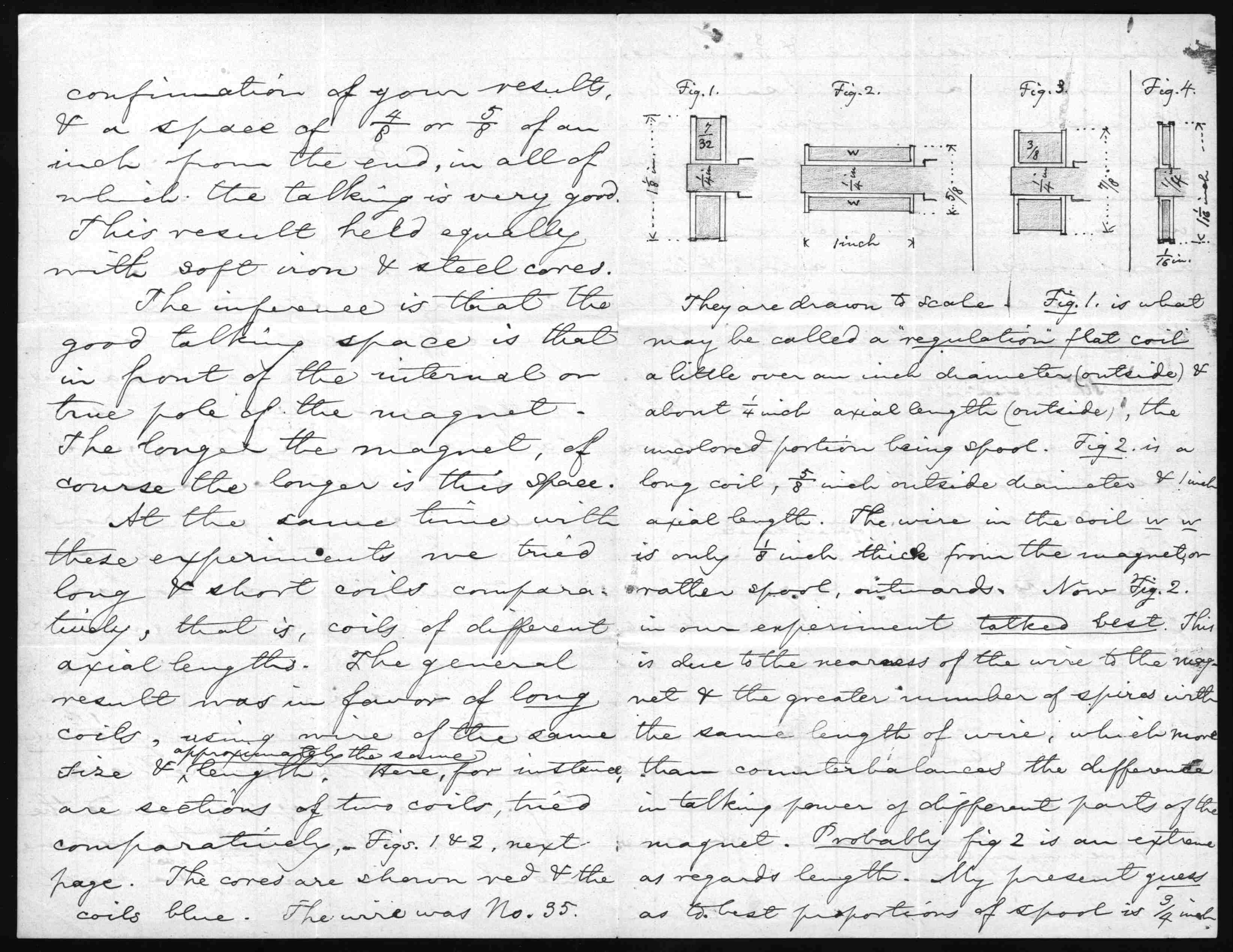
1877 letter to Alexander Graham Bell discussing the most effective sizing and arrangement of bar magnet components for efficient sound transmission.

Able to sustain himself financially from the fire-alarm system invention and previous family wealth, Channing relocated to Providence in 1861 to research improvements to the nascent telephone with John Peirce, Eli Blake, and Edson Jones of Brown University. He worked with Peirce to refine the electromagnetic microphone, experimenting with Alexander Graham Bell’s proposed bar magnet design. (Coincidentally, Lewis Howard Latimer, the son of George Latimer, also worked with Bell, producing drawings for Bell’s 1876 patent.) Based on the Providence research, in 1877 Channing built the first portable telephone, and devised the handle receiver that enabled commercialization and became the popularized design.

While in Providence, Channing provided early observations of wireless signal transmission. He noted the phenomenon of interference sounds on the telephone from lightning that preceded the flash. Channing also described an incident in August 1877 where, while conversing with friend Henry W. Vaughan by telephone, they heard singing coming through on their phone line. They eventually determined the music was being performed as part of a series of concerts transmitted from New York City to Saratoga by Thomas Edison over separate phone lines at the same time as their conversation, conveyed to their line by induction. Channing remarked at the unique electromagnetic sensitivity of the magneto-telephone and its potential for use in arts and science.

== Personal life ==
Channing married Susan Elizabeth Burdick of Nantucket in 1850. They had a daughter, Eva, and son, Allston. Channing and Burdick divorced in July 1859. Later that year, he married Mary Jane Tarr of Boston. They had three children: Mary, Grace Ellery, and Harold.

In 1884, Channing moved to Pasadena, California, for the benefit of Mary’s health. After her death in 1897, Channing returned to Boston in 1900, where he died the following year on March 19, 1901.

== Works ==
- 1852: Davis’s Manual of Magnetism
- 1855: The American fire-alarm telegraph
- 1865: The medical application of electricity

=== Patents ===
- 1857: US 17355A – Improvement in electric magnetic fire-alarm telegraphs for cities
- 1865: US 46878A – Certain improvements in marine railways
- 1875: US RE6241E – Improvement in electromagnetic fire-alarm telegraphs for cities
