= Grace Ellery Channing =

American writer, poet (1862–1937)

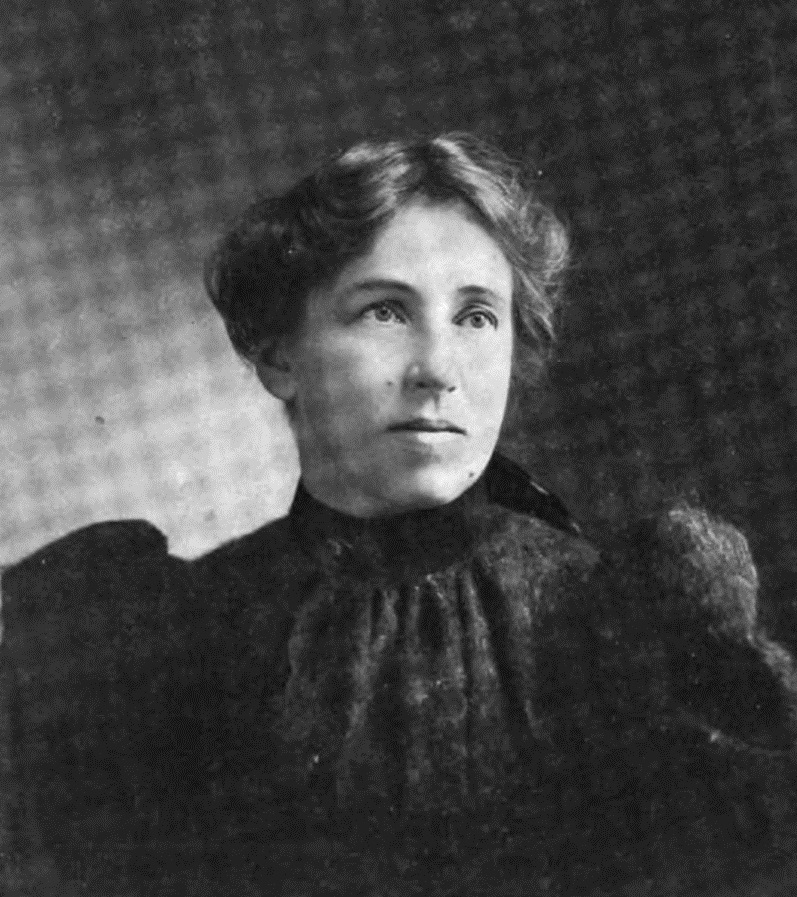
- Born: December 27, 1862; Providence, Rhode Island, U.S.
- Died: April 3, 1937 (aged 74); New York, New York, U.S.
- Occupations: Writer, poet
- Spouse: Charles Walter Stetson (m. 1894; died 1911)

Grace Ellery Channing (December 27, 1862 – April 3, 1937) was a writer and poet who published often in The Land of Sunshine.

== Early life ==
Grace Channing was born to inventor William Francis Channing and Mary Jane (née Tarr) on December 27, 1862 in Providence, Rhode Island. Her paternal grandfather was William Ellery Channing, a noted early nineteenth-century Unitarian preacher and founder of the American Unitarian Church. Also through her father, she was a great-great-granddaughter of William Ellery (1727–1820), a signer of the United States Declaration of Independence. Channing had two siblings: Mary Channing Wood (who married Clarence Wood and had two children, Dorothy and Ellery) and Harold Channing, as well as half-sister Eva Channing. Channing received a private school education, graduating from the Normal Class for Kindergarten in 1882. After graduation, she taught at the free kindergarten in Providence.

Channing moved from Rhode Island, to Southern California in 1885, as part of a successful bid to cure her lung troubles.

== Personal life ==
In October 1885, Charlotte Perkins Gilman spent the winter with Channing and her family in Southern California when Gilman was suffering acute postpartum depression. During the winter of 1887 to 1888, Gilman and Channing returned east and spent part of their summers together in Bristol, Rhode Island. Gilman and daughter Katharine moved with Grace from Providence to Pasadena, where the Channing family owned a home, in the fall of 1888. From 1890 to 1893, Channing visited her friend Augusta Senter and traveled around Italy and Germany. In 1894, soon after his divorce from Gilman, Channing married Charles Walter Stetson.

Channing was good friends with Gilman, and the three continued to have good relations after the divorce and marriage. Stetson and Gilman's daughter, Katharine, went to live with Channing and Stetson when she was 9. In 1897 and 1898, Channing and Stetson traveled around England, Italy, and Germany. They returned to Boston afterward. In April 1902, they moved permanently to Rome. Their friends in Rome included Elihu Vedder, Diego Angeli, and Franklin Simmons. After the death of Stetson in 1911, Channing returned to the United States. From 1918 to 1936, Channing lived in New York in poor health and poverty until her death.

She died at her home in Manhattan on April 3, 1937.

== Career ==
Channing began her career as a writer by editing her grandfather's memoirs, Dr. Channing's Notebook (1887). She became an associate editor of The Land of Sunshine (later Out West), and in her tenure as a writer and poet contributor to the publication, advocated for an increased reliance on Mediterranean practices for Los Angelenos. This included embracing the sun instead of avoiding it, eating lighter food, and taking in wine and afternoon naps.

Channing attempted to create a calendar featuring the artwork of Stetson and excerpts from Walt Whitman's Leaves of Grass. Although his feelings about Channing and her work were friendly and positive, Whitman did not approve of the use of his work in this calendar and the calendar was never produced.

Her poetry and other writing was influenced by three years in Italy in the early 1890s and by her time living in Southern California. During this time in Italy, she wrote the articles "What lessons Rome can teach us", and "Florence of the English poets" to describe Italy for an American audience.

Many of her stories were featured in Harper's Magazine, The Atlantic Monthly, and The Saturday Evening Post. These stories were "didactic and dramatic portraits of women who found happiness in self-sacrificing love for and dependence on good men, or who nobly endured the weakness of their partners and lived and suffered happily ever after." Her works included The Sister of a Saint (1895), The Fortune of a Day (1900), and Sea Drift (1899).

When Channing lived in Rome in the early 1900s, she helped edit and compile Elihu Vedder's autobiography in exchange for financial support.

After the death of her husband, Channing put together a traveling exhibit of Charles Walter Stetson's paintings but she was unable to sell his works, as his style of painting had fallen out of fashion.

In 1916, Channing was a war correspondent on the French and Italian fronts. The stories and poetry she wrote at this time were very conservative and critical of exemption from military service, encouraging the war effort and often idealizing the sacrifice of the wives and mothers of enlisted men. She admired Mussolini and was disappointed in Woodrow Wilson's peace solution.

== Bibliography ==
- Starr, Kevin (1985). Inventing the Dream: California through the Progressive Era. New York: Oxford University Press. ISBN 978-0195042344.
- Grimm, Robert Thornton (Spring 1997). "Forerunner for a Domestic Revolution: Jane Addams, Charlotte Perkins Gilman, and the Ideology of Childhood, 1900-1916". Illinois Historical Journal. 90 (1): 47–64. JSTOR 40193109.
- Makwosky, Veronica (Summer 1993). "Fear of Feeling and the Turn-of-the-Century Woman of Letters". American Literary History. 5 (2): 326–334. doi:10.1093/alh/5.2.326. JSTOR 489751.
