= William Channing =

William Channing may refer to:

- William Ellery Channing (1780–1842), Unitarian preacher of the early nineteenth century
- William Ellery Channing (poet) (1818–1901), Transcendentalist poet, nephew of the preacher
- William Henry Channing (1810–1884), American writer and philosopher
- William Francis Channing (1820–1901), American activist, electrical researcher, scientist and inventor
