= Joe Hale =

Joe or Joseph Hale may refer to:

- Joseph Hale (MP) (1913–1985), British engineer and politician
- Joseph R. Hale (1927–1993), American politician, member of the Illinois House of Representatives
- Joe Hale, founder of Network of International Christian Schools
- Joe Hale (producer) (1925–2025), American animator, layout artist, and film producer

== See also ==
- Joseph Haile House, an historic house in Providence, Rhode Island
- Joseph Hale Abbot, American educator, inventor, and science writer
