= Henry Bowditch =

Henry Bowditch may refer to:

- Henry Ingersoll Bowditch (1808–1892), American abolitionist
- Henry Pickering Bowditch (1840–1911), American physiologist
