= Winifred Latimer Norman =

American historical preservationist (1914–2014)

- Winifred Latimer Norman, from a 1971 newspaper.
- Born: October 7, 1914; Flushing, New York
- Died: February 4, 2014 (aged 99); Manhattan, New York
- Occupations: Social worker, historical preservationist, author

Winifred Latimer Norman (October 7, 1914 – February 4, 2014) was an American social worker, active in efforts to preserve her grandfather Lewis Howard Latimer's legacy in Flushing, Queens.

== Early life ==
Winifred Latimer Norman was born in Flushing, the daughter of Gerald Fitzherbert Norman and Jeanette Latimer Norman. Her father was a teacher. Her grandfather was inventor and poet Lewis Howard Latimer. Her great-grandfather George Latimer escaped slavery in Virginia and was active in the abolition movement in Massachusetts. She graduated from Flushing High School, and from Hunter College, where she was one of only 15 black graduates in 1935. She earned a master's degree at New York University.

== Career ==
Norman was a social worker by profession, and lived in New York City. She represented the Latimer family at various events and commemorations throughout her life. She and her brother Gerald helped to lead the effort to preserve the Lewis H. Latimer House in Flushing; their grandfather's home, where they played as children, is now a museum on the National Register of Historic Places. She and her brother were honored by the Duquesne Light Company in 1989, for their work in bringing Latimer's story to a new generation. She co-wrote a middle-grades book about her grandfather, Lewis Latimer: Scientist (1994, with Lily Patterson, foreword by Coretta Scott King).

Norman was active in religious organizations, and served on the board of trustees of the Unitarian Universalist Association. She was a member of the International Association for Religious Freedom and the International Association for Liberal Religious Women. The Fourth Universalist Society in the City of New York, where she was a member, created a Winifred Latimer Norman Award in the Area of Social Justice in her honor.

Norman was a charter member of the North Manhattan chapter of Delta Sigma Theta.

== Personal life ==
Norman died in 2014, aged 99 years, in New York City. Her papers are included in the Latimer Family Papers at the Queens Public Library.
