= Francis Ellingwood Abbot =

American philosopher and theologian (1836-1903)

- 1872 portrait of Abbot
- Born: November 6, 1836; Boston, Massachusetts, U.S.
- Died: October 23, 1903 (aged 66); Beverly, Massachusetts, U.S.
- Cause of death: Suicide by poisoning
- Education: Harvard University
- Occupations: Philosopher, theologian
- Father: Joseph Hale Abbot

Francis Ellingwood Abbot (November 6, 1836 – October 23, 1903) was an American philosopher and theologian who sought to reconstruct theology in accordance with the scientific method.

His lifelong romance with his wife, Katharine Fearing Loring, forms the subject of If Ever Two Were One, a collection of his correspondence and diary entries.

== Biography ==
Abbot was born to Joseph Hale Abbot and Fanny Ellingwood Larcom on November 6, 1836 in Boston, Massachusetts. He married Katherine Fearing on August 3, 1859 in Nashua, New Hampshire. The couple had three children: Everett Vergnies, Fanny Larcom, and Edward Stanley Abbot.

As a spokesman for "free religion", he asserted that Christianity, understood as based on the lordship of Christ, is no longer tenable. He rejected all dogma and reliance on Scriptures or creeds, teaching the truth is open to every individual.

Abbot graduated from Harvard University and the Meadville Theological School. He served Unitarian churches in Dover, New Hampshire, and Toledo, Ohio, but his ministry proved controversial, and in 1868 New Hampshire's highest court ruled that the Dover, New Hampshire, First Unitarian Society of Christians' chosen minister was insufficiently "Christian" to serve his congregation. See Hale v. Everett, 53 N.H. 9 (1868). The Rev. Abbot had, it said, once preached that:

Whoever has been so fired in his own spirit by the overwhelming thought of the Divine Being as to kindle the flames of faith in the hearts of his fellow men, whether Confucius, or Zoroaster, or Moses, or Jesus, or Mohammed, has thereby proved himself to be a prophet of the living God; and thus every great historic religion dates from a genuine inspiration by the Eternal Spirit.

In another sermon, the court noted, Rev. Abbot had even declared that

America is every whit as sacred as Judea. God is as near to you and to me, as ever he was to Moses, to Jesus, or to Paul. Wherever a human soul is born into the love of truth and high virtue, there is the "Holy Land." Wherever a human soul has uttered its sincere and brave faith in the Divine, and thus bequeathed to us the legacy of inspired words, there is the "Holy Bible."

"If Protestantism would include Mr. Abbot in this case," New Hampshire's highest court concluded,

it would of course include Thomas Jefferson, and by the same rule also Thomas Paine, whom Gov. Plumer of New Hampshire called "that outrageous blasphemer," that "infamous blasphemer," "that miscreant Paine," whose "Age of Reason" Plumer had read "with unqualified disapprobation of its tone and temper, its coarse vulgarity, and its unfair appeals to the passions and prejudices of his readers."

Hale v. Everett, 53 N.H. 9, 87-88 (1868).

But opinions concerning Abbot diverged widely. Frederick Douglass, for example, praised Frank Abbot for doing "much to break the fetters of religious superstition, for which he is entitled to gratitude." Letter from Hon. Frederick Douglass to Rev. M.J. Savage (June 15, 1880), published in Farewell Dinner to Francis Ellingwood Abbot, on Retiring from the Editorship of "The Index" 48 (George H. Ellis, 1880).

The Impeachment of Christianity

Following the controversy in New Hampshire, Abbot left the ministry in 1868 to write, edit, and teach. Abbot's theological position was stated in Scientific Theism (1885) and The Way Out of Agnosticism (1890). In the latter book, Josiah Royce wrote an article so scathing that Abbot took it as an unfair attempt to destroy his reputation, and eventually responded publicly with Mr. Royce's Libel (1891 October) in which he sought redress from Royce's employer Harvard University. The debate moved to the pages of The Nation, where Charles Sanders Peirce took Abbot's side; William James and Joseph Bangs Warner, less so. In his 1903 obituary of Abbot, Peirce praised Abbot's philosophical work and love of truth, and wrote that, in the introduction to Scientific Theism (wherein Abbot criticized nominalism and traced it through Kant among others), Abbot "put his finger unerringly [...] upon the one great blunder of all modern philosophy." (For the full texts of the public controversy and the obituary, see "External links" below.)

Abbot committed suicide in 1903 by taking sleeping pills at his wife's gravesite in Central Cemetery, Beverly, Massachusetts, on the 10th anniversary of her death.

== See also ==
- American philosophy
- List of American philosophers
