= Charles Walter Stetson =

American painter (1858–1911)

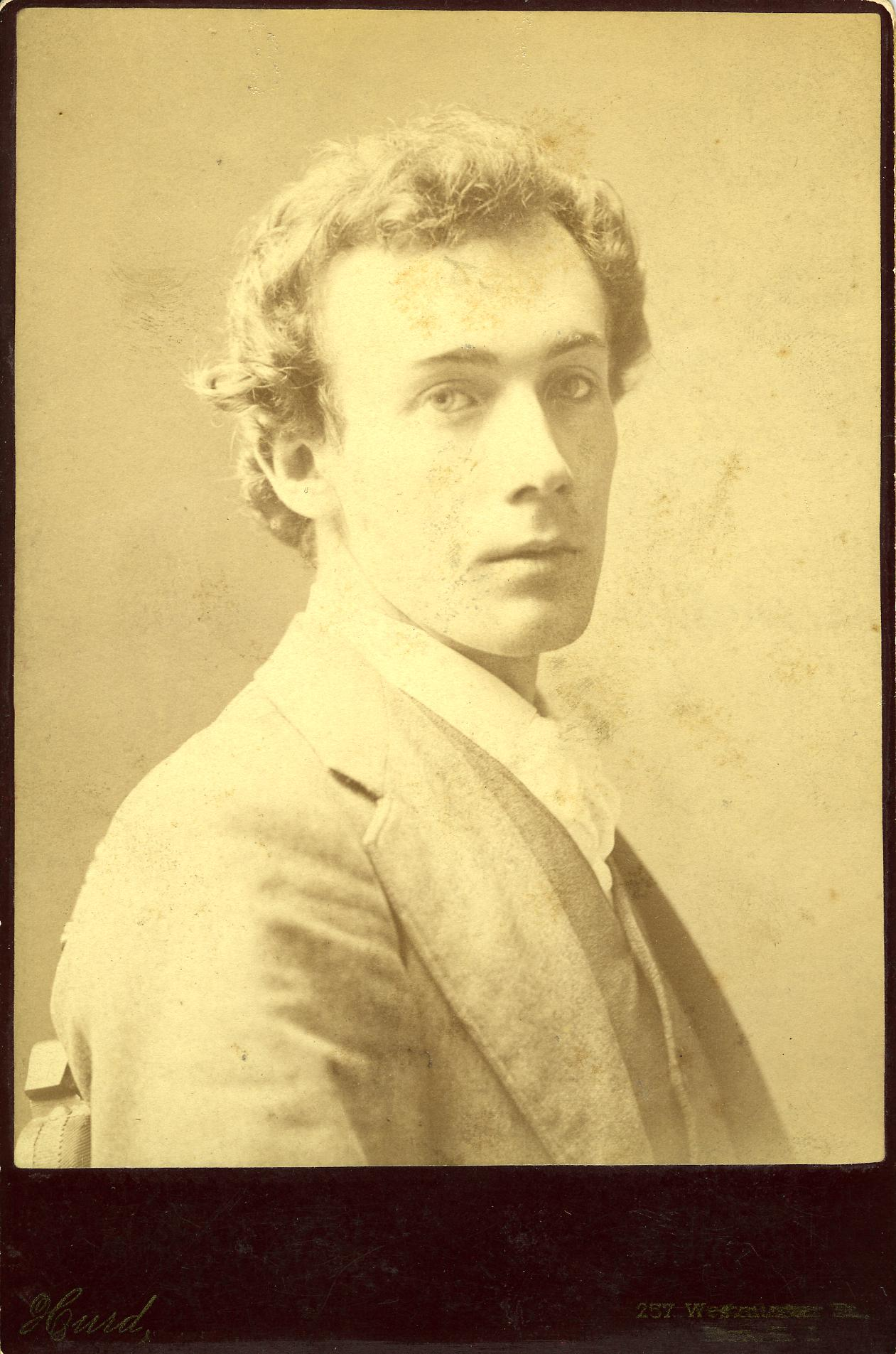
- Formal portrait of Charles Walter Stetson, circa 1884
- Born: March 25, 1858; Tiverton Four Corners, Rhode Island, U.S.
- Died: July 21, 1911 (aged 53); Rome, Italy
- Spouses: Charlotte Perkins (m. 1884; div. 1894) Grace Ellery Channing (m. 1894)
- Children: 1

Charles Walter Stetson (March 25, 1858 – July 21, 1911) was an American artist often described as a "colorist" for his rich use of color.

== Life ==
Stetson was born in Tiverton Four Corners, Rhode Island on March 25, 1858. His father was a Baptist preacher, and the family faced economic worries.

Stetson was a self-taught painter. At the age of 14 he began painting, and at the age of 20 he opened his own studio in Providence, Rhode Island. He became friends with fellow artists Edward Bannister and George William Whitaker. Their meetings together resulted in the founding of the Providence Art Club on February 19, 1880.

He married Charlotte Perkins in 1884. Their only child was born in 1885, they were separated in 1888, and they divorced amicably in 1894. Not long after, Stetson married Charlotte's cousin and closest friend, poet Grace Ellery Channing. After marrying Grace, Stetson moved to California, and then in 1901 they moved to Rome, Kingdom of Italy.

Stetson died in Rome in 1911.

== Influence and legacy ==
Stetson was more widely known outside of the state than other Rhode Island artists of his time. His work stood out for its allegorical, imaginative qualities and greater richness of color.

== Honors ==
Stetson was inducted into the Rhode Island Heritage Hall of Fame in 2011.
