= James Batchelder =

American lawman

James Batchelder (1830–1854) was the third United States Marshal to be killed in the line of duty. Batchelder was a truckman employed by the Marshals, and assigned to stand guard at the Boston Court House, where Anthony Burns, an escaped slave captured by slave-hunters, was imprisoned.

President Franklin Pierce was determined to turn over an escaped slave from Boston - a center of abolitionist activity - in order to show Southern politicians that Northern states would enforce the Fugitive Slave Act, a key provision of the Compromise of 1850.

On the night of May 26, 1854, a crowd of black and white Bostonians, planning to rescue Burns, tried to force the doors of the Court House with axes, and a long plank used as a battering ram. There was a confused struggle as the crowd was turned back by the guards at the Court House. Gunfire broke out between the guards and the crowd. Batchelder believed he had been stabbed in the moment, and doctor Charles Thomas Jackson described the wound as being caused by a double-edged blade after examination. However, physician and Boston Vigilance Committee member William Francis Channing determined Batchelder had in fact been shot by Lewis Hayden, who lacked a proper pistol round and used an improvised type of slug that could cause a wound resembling the one described.

The marshals physically blocked the crowd from forcing their way into the Court House, until Boston police and a military patrol arrived to disperse the crowd and make arrests. Burns was ultimately forced back into slavery in Virginia, with Pierce deploying federal artillery and United States Marines to ensure the enforcement of the law.

In his autobiography Cheerful Yesterdays, Thomas Wentworth Higginson, one of the leaders of the rescue party commented "There had been other fugitive slave rescues in different parts of the country, but this was the first drop of blood actually shed. In all the long procession of events which led the nation through the Kansas struggle, past the John Brown foray and up to the Emancipation Proclamation, the killing of Batchelder was the first act of violence. It was like the firing on Fort Sumter, a proof that war had begun."

== Criminal investigation ==
Numerous men were arrested during the Friday night riot in Court Square where Batchelder was killed and nine of these were arraigned, charged with his murder. The next day, a black man by the name of Nelson Hopewell was arrested and found to be in the possession of a bloodstained knife, and he was also charged with the murder. Two more men, John C. Cluer and John Morrison, were subsequently arrested and also charged with the murder. Ultimately, some of these men were indicted, but a large group of prominent, abolitionist lawyers rushed to their defence with the result that the indictments were abandoned and the men were never brought to trial. Later, one of these lawyers, Theodore C. Parker published a polemic entitled "Defence" which he described as the argument he had planned to give if a trial had occurred.
