= Fire alarm call box =

Device for notifying a fire department of a fire

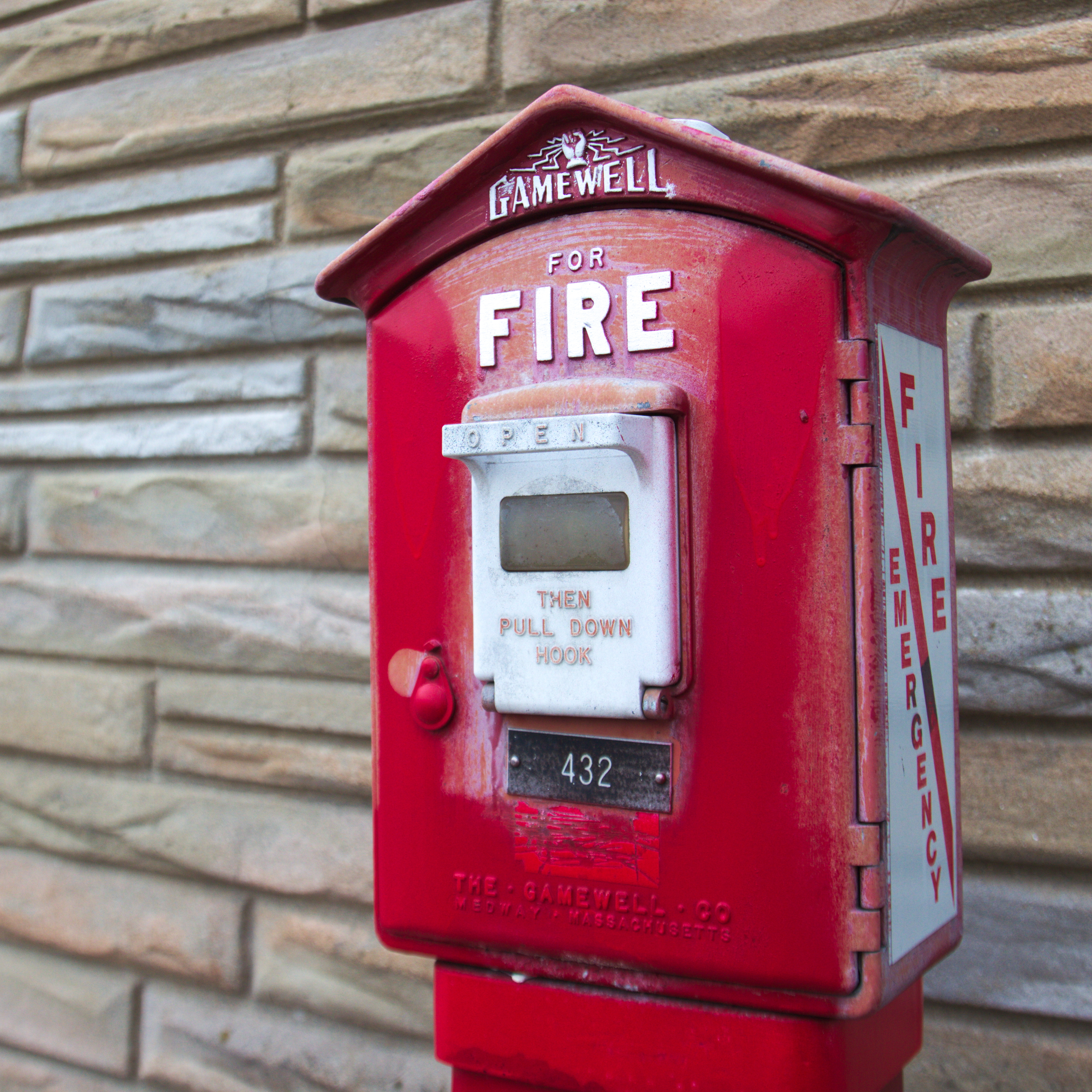
Fire alarm call box (Somerville, Massachusetts)

A fire alarm box, fire alarm call box, or fire alarm pull box is a device used for notifying a fire department of a fire or a fire alarm activation. Typically installed on street corners or on the outside of commercial buildings in urban areas, they were the main means of summoning firefighters before the general availability of telephones. Fire alarm call boxes are still widely used in many cities and towns.

== Operation ==
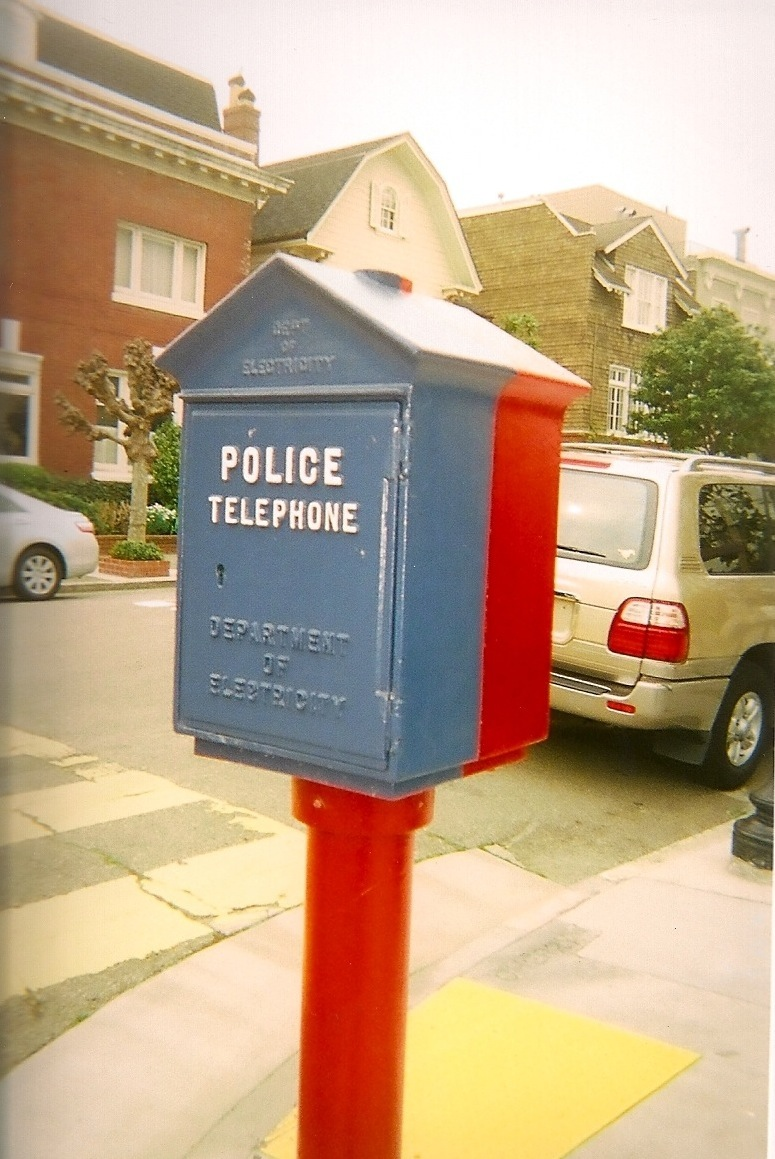
Combined police telephone and fire alarm (San Francisco)

When the box is activated by turning a knob or pulling a hook, a spring-loaded wheel turns, tapping out a pulsed electrical signal corresponding to the box's number. A receiver at fire headquarters announces the alarm through flashing lights or tones, or via a pen recorder, and the box number is matched to a list of box locations. In modern installations a computer receives and translates the pulses; in unmanned installations in small communities, the box number may be sounded out by a horn or bell audible community-wide. Some call boxes can be wired to a fire alarm control panel or annunciator to send a signal to a fire station or dispatch center when a fire alarm is activated in a particular building. Telegraph systems do not automatically give any information about why an alarm was triggered, only the box number which tells firefighters where to respond. However, the call boxes can include a telegraph key to allow firefighters to summon additional resources.

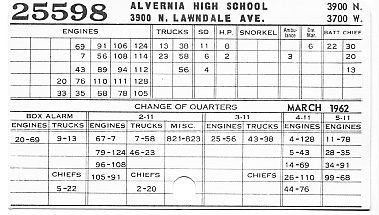
A box card used by the Chicago Fire Department

The number the box transmits to the central office corresponds to pre-planned instructions listing appropriate firefighting companies for the given location and severity as a way to expedite dispatch of necessary firefighting resources. Traditionally, the instructions were on index cards and organized by box number in alphabetical order rather than numeric, to match the order the digits came in on the telegraph. In modern systems, the instructions are computerized.

== History ==
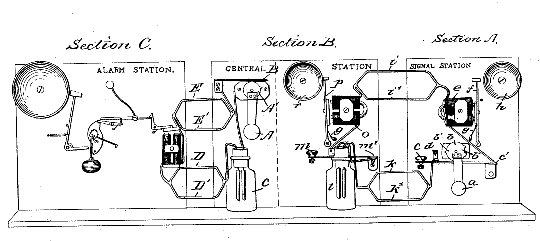
Patent drawing depicting the signal station (alarm box), the central dispatching station, and the alarm station at the fire house.

The first telegraph fire alarm system was developed by William Francis Channing and Moses G. Farmer in Boston, Massachusetts.

In 1845, Channing published a description of a telegraph for the purposes of alerting city officials to a fire. He specified such a system would have mechanisms for distributed boxes to transmit coded information to a central location by telegraph, and provide circuits for the centralized office to relay messages to fire houses to initiate a response. Unlike long-distance telegraph systems which often relied on grounding to complete their circuits, the alarm circuit would use dedicated conductors for reliability.

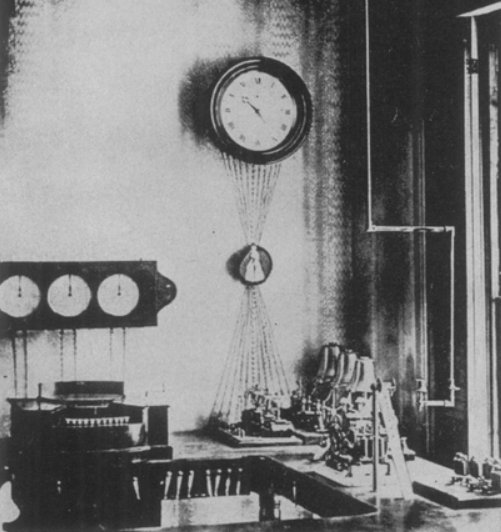
Fire-alarm system installed at Boston City Hall in 1852.

Farmer developed a telegraph-commanded bell mechanism, and Channing saw its potential for his theorized alarm system. The pair demonstrated a prototype to the mayor in 1848 that rang a bell in the belfry of Boston City Hall by telegraph signal from New York City. In 1851, Channing submitted a detailed proposal to the Boston municipal government, which authorized construction of a functioning system for $10,000. The system installed in 1852 consisted of 40 black street boxes and 19 bells, centralized at 21 Court Square near city hall. It was first activated the day after completion, on April 29, 1852 at 8:25 p.m. Channing and Farmer received patent number 17,355 for their "Electromagnetic Fire Alarm Telegraph for Cities" in 1857.

In 1855, John Nelson Gamewell of South Carolina attended Channing’s lecture on his alarm system at the Smithsonian. Gamewell purchased regional rights to market the fire alarm telegraph in southern states with financing help from friend James Dunlap. They later obtained the patents and full rights to the system in 1859 for $30,000. The initial commercialization was unsuccessful due to the outbreak of the American Civil War, during which the government seized the patents from Gamewell.

Following the war, John F. Kennard bought the patents from the government and returned them to Gamewell, forming a partnership, Kennard and Co., in 1867 to manufacture the alarm systems. The Gamewell Fire Alarm Telegraph Co. was later formed in 1879. Gamewell systems were installed in 250 cities by 1886 and 500 cities in 1890. By 1910, Gamewell had gained a 95% market share.

In 1962, Gamewell released their most popular non-coded fire pull station, using the design until the 2010s. In 1982, Gamewell partnered with the Cerberus group in the marketing of the Cerberus R-7. In 1984, Gamewell joined the Cerberus group. In 1989, Gamewell introduced the Gamewell Identifire Network System 2. Later in 1989, Cerberus Technologies merged Gamewell with Pyrotronics to form Cerberus Pyrotronics. In 1990, Gamewell split from Cerberus AG and Cerberus Pyrotronics, becoming an independent company. In 1994, Gamewell introduced the Gamewell-FCI 600 series with an autoprogramming feature. In 2003, Honeywell acquired Gamewell, and in 2005, Honeywell merged Gamewell with Fire Control Instruments to form Gamewell-FCI.

Since the advent of in-building alarms and emergency telephone numbers, the use of public alarm boxes as a primary alerting method has waned, but many locations continue to maintain systems as a backup. Even in areas that no longer use the actual call boxes, the "box" terminology persists as a method for tracking the incident location and units responding ("Five alarm Fire").

== Robustness ==
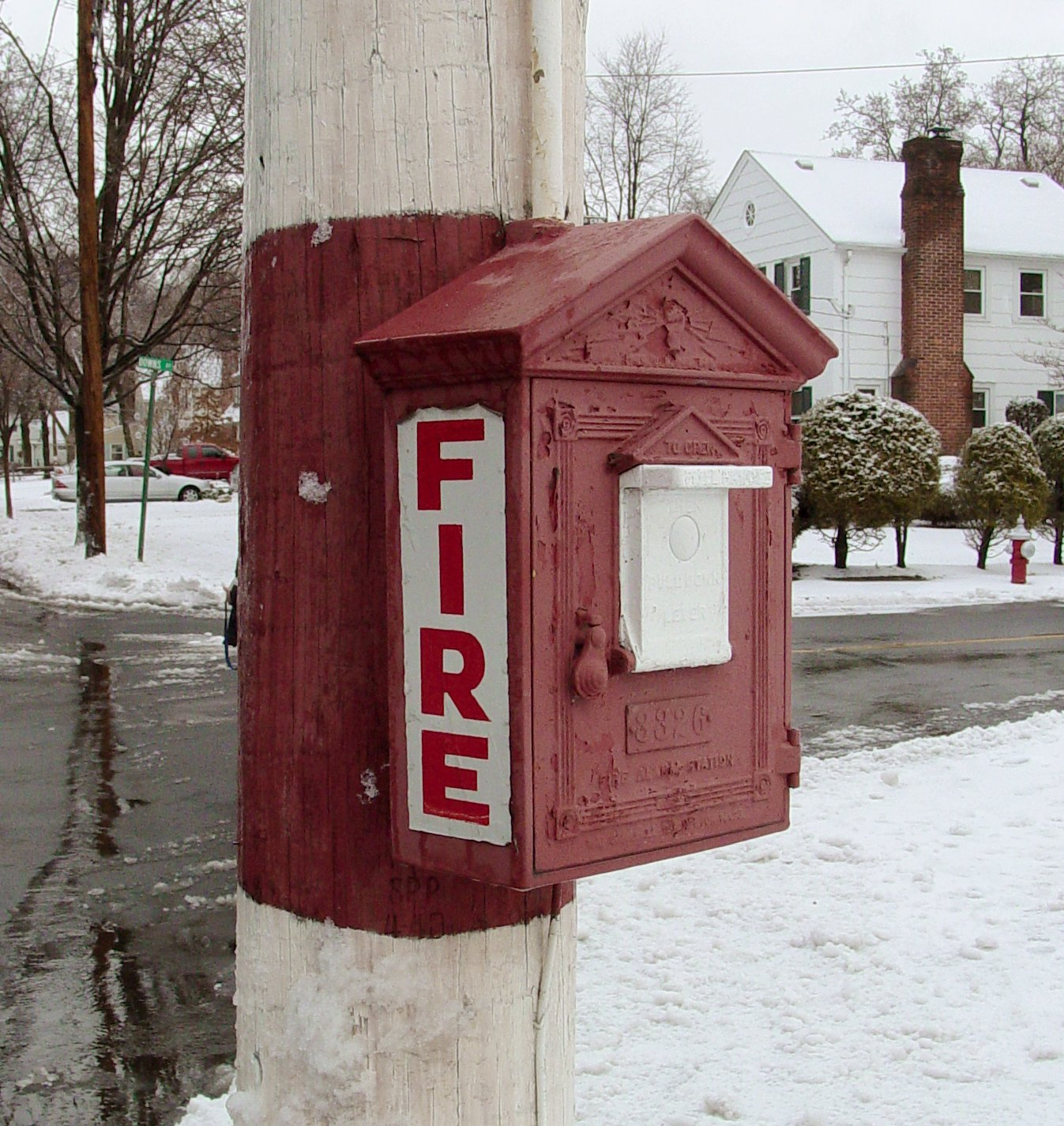
Gamewell fire alarm box (Ridgewood, New Jersey)

Though fire alarm boxes remain in use, many communities have removed them, relying instead on the widespread availability of landline and cellular telephones. Cities like San Francisco still rely heavily on fire alarm boxes for redundancy in case of emergency. Some municipalities still maintain their fire alarm boxes near schools and other sensitive locations.

The simplicity of telegraph alarm boxes and their associated networks means that they are able to operate under conditions (such as a lengthy or widespread power outage, a natural disaster, or any emergency causing many people to attempt to contact others simultaneously) which may disrupt or disable other communication systems such as landline phones, cellular phones, and emergency services' radio systems.

Despite lack of popular awareness that the boxes still work, a fire box was used to report a fire in Boston in December 2018 during a 9-1-1 outage. Recommendations by the emergency services teams in Massachusetts to locate and use the boxes were issued in a subsequent outage of the 9-1-1 system as well.

== False alarm countermeasures ==
In the later years of their use and proliferation, some fire boxes were designed with special devices and other functions in place in an attempt to curb the nuisance of false alarms. Some of these included an "ear-shattering" wail that would cause discomfort to someone activating the box, while others would handcuff a detachable part of the device to the person triggering the alarm, so that responding police and fire officials (who possessed the key for release) could more easily identify and contact the individual responsible for the activated alarm.
