= Latimer Gardens =

Public housing development in Queens, New York

- NYCHA Property
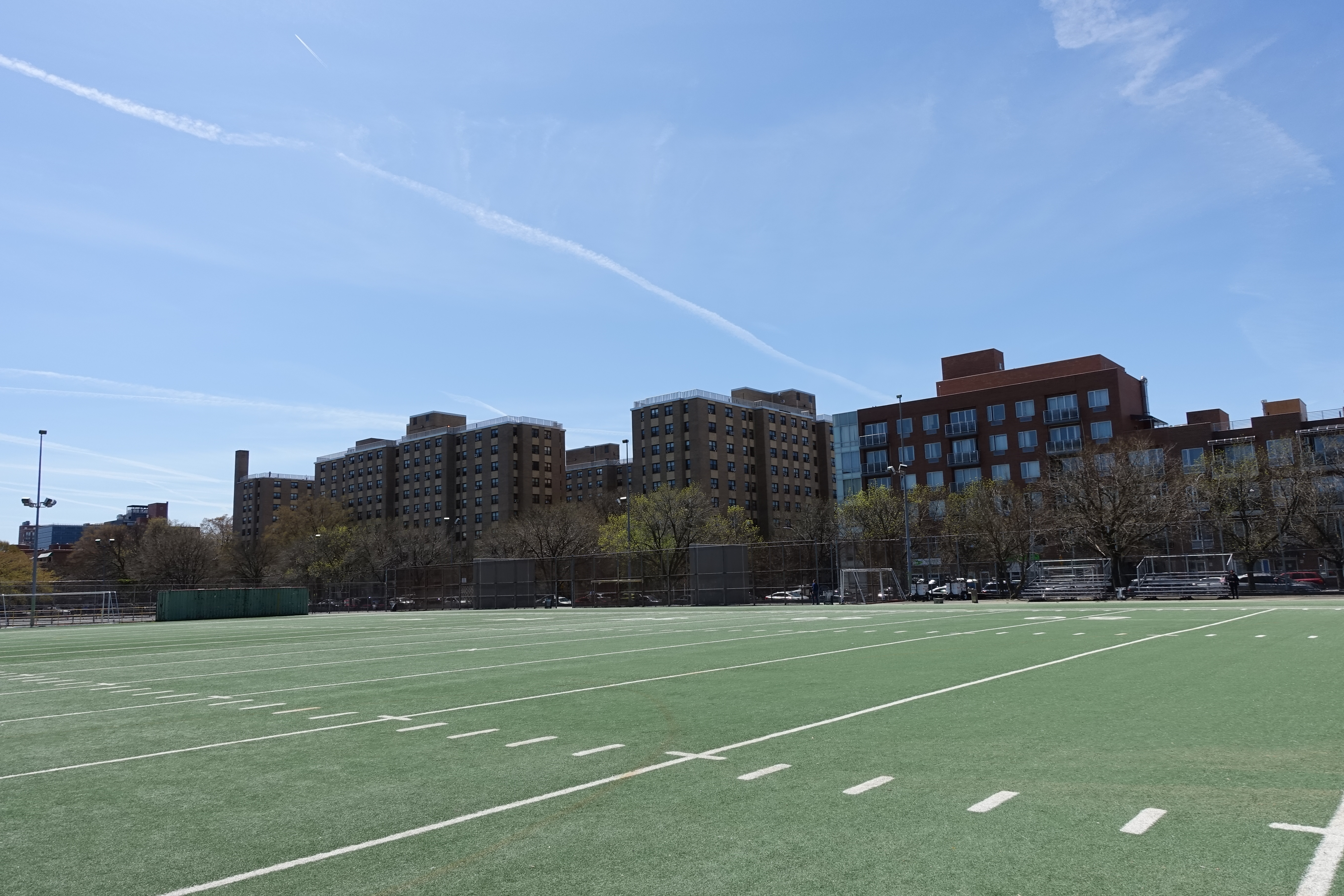
- Seen from the Leavitt Field
- Interactive map of Latimer Gardens
- Country: United States
- State: New York
- City: New York City
- Borough: Queens

Area
  - Total: 3.92 acres (1.59 ha)

Population
  - Total: 752
- Zip Code: 11354

The Latimer Gardens is a NYCHA housing project with four 10-story buildings. It is located on a block between Linden Place and 137th Street/Leavitt Street and also between 35th Avenue and Latimer Place in Flushing, Queens.

== History ==
The site of the project was approved by the City Planning Commission and Board of Estimate in 1966 and construction of the project began in August 1968. This housing project was completed in September 1970 and fully occupied by December of the same year. A dedication ceremony for Latimer Gardens was held in June 1971, which was attended by NYCHA Chair Simeon Golar, City Comptroller Abraham Beame and Deputy Comptroller Gerald Latimer Norman (the grandson of Lewis Howard Latimer, whom the project was named for).

In 1988, the Lewis H. Latimer House was moved from 137–53 Holly Avenue in Flushing to Leavitt Field, a city-owned field across the street from Latimer Gardens, to save the historic house from being demolished.

=== 21st century ===
A Public Notice for this housing project and the others was published in November 2025 regarding that this housing project is unknown if it's eligible for the HUD Program of Section 106.

== See also ==
- New York City Housing Authority
