= Lewis H. Latimer House =

Museum in Queens, New York

Coordinates: 40.766063°N 73.829402°W

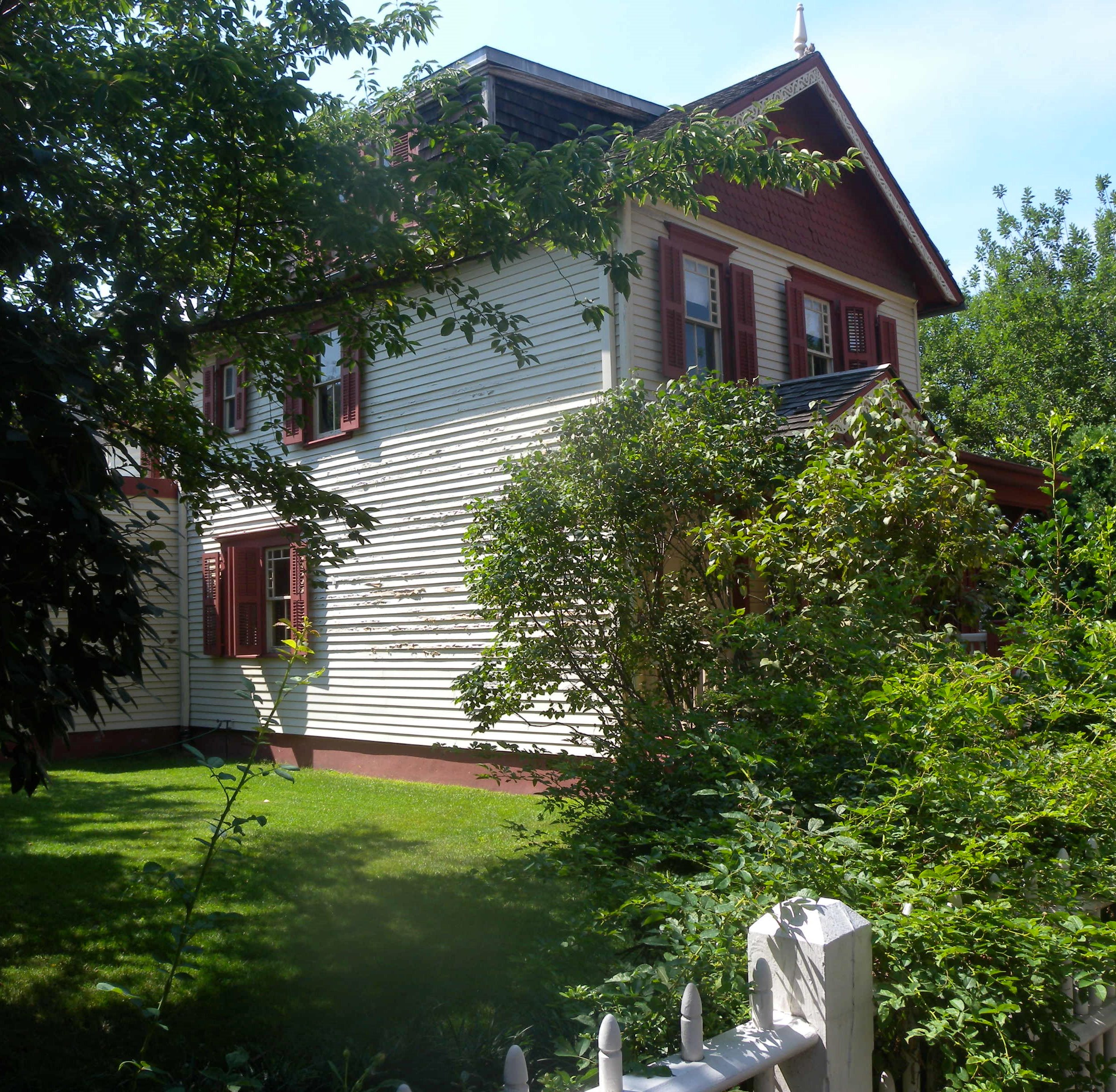
The Lewis H. Latimer House

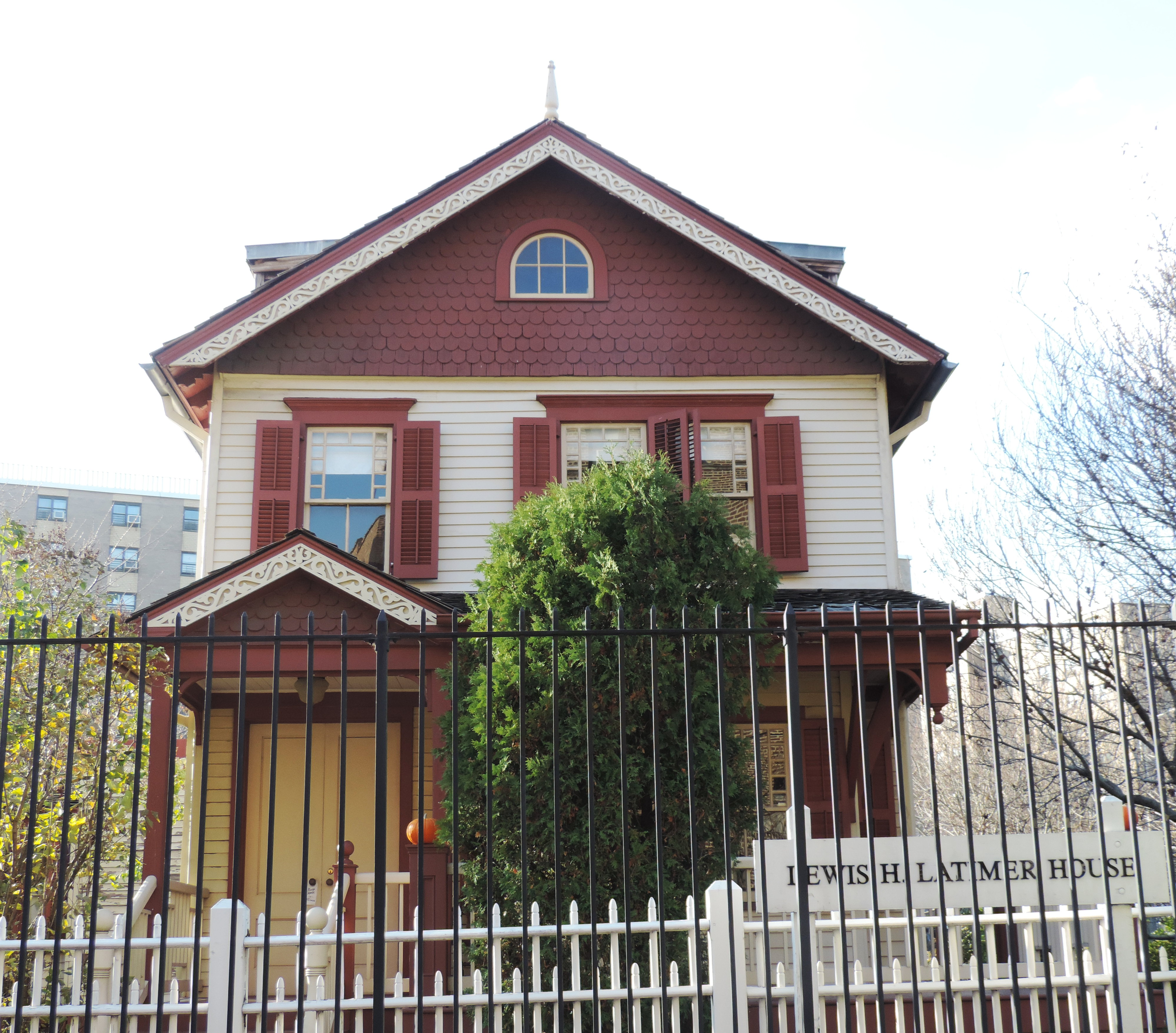
East side of house

The Lewis H. Latimer House, also called the Latimer House or the Lewis Latimer House, is a historic house located at 34-41 137th Street in Flushing, Queens, New York City. It was constructed in the Queen Anne style of architecture between 1887 and 1889 by the Sexton family. It served as the home of the African-American inventor Lewis Howard Latimer from 1903 to 1928, and is now operated as a museum dedicated to the inventor's work. In addition, this museum-house also illuminated the life and achievements of other black scientists. The house remained property of the Latimer family until 1963. Currently, the Lewis H. Latimer House is owned by the New York City Department of Parks and Recreation, operated by the Lewis H. Latimer Fund, Inc., and is a member of the Historic House Trust.

== History ==
=== Original residence ===
The house, purchased by Latimer in 1902 was in a predominantly white neighborhood in Flushing, Queens. Lewis Latimer sought to work together with members of this community to establish a local chapter of the Unitarian Church as part of his belief in racial integration. There were a number of drawings, dated prior to 1885, on which he claimed his credit as "inventor," found within his Queens home.

This house was a two-and-a-half-story frame house. The house itself, prior to Latimer's purchase of it, was said to be 100 years old. Two major alterations were made to the house when Latimer owned the structure. A one-story studio was added to the south-east corner of the home and, in 1912, the attic was enlarged with dormers. After Latimer's death, structural changes were made to the home, such as the enclosing of the front porch. When the house was later moved, the studio was discarded as it was not known to be Latimer's studio.

In February 1986, City Councilman Morton Povman presented a City Council proclamation to Latimer's granddaughter Winifred Norman, saying: "There aren't many people who have achieved so much in so many fields". Artist Tom Lloyd stated "There are very few houses related to black people designated as landmarks in New York City and State".

=== Preservation ===
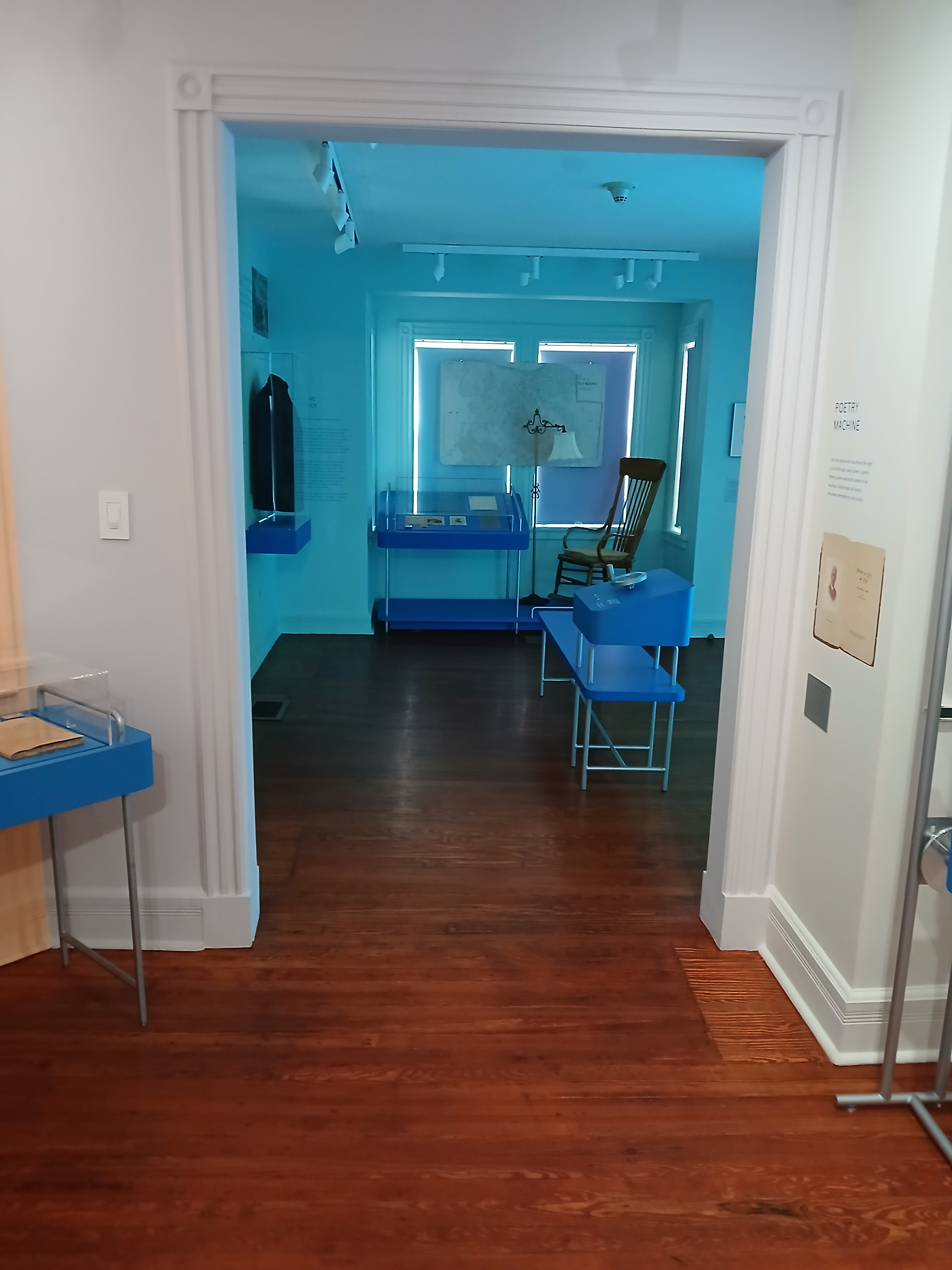
An exhibition area in the house

Originally located on Holly Avenue, the Latimer House was moved to its current home in Leavitt Field in 1988 when threatened by demolition. A group of citizens who formed the committee to Save the Latimer House launched a major campaign in order to preserve this historic house. Two such members were Latimer's grandchildren, Gerald Latimer Norman and Winifred Latimer Norman. Tom Lloyd and Rev. Mitchell with assistance from the Queens Historical Society quickly formed The committee to Save Latimer House, with those two as co-chairmen; this was done in response to the house's imminent destruction, reported from William Asadorian, librarian from the Long Island Division of the Queens Borough Public Library. The General Electric Foundation Official Web-site, funded by General Electric, pledged $25,000 of the $36,000 needed to move the house to its new location. According to Mr. Lloyd, the purpose for relocating the house to the city-owned field on Leavitt Street was because the field was across the street from Latimer Gardens, themselves named after Lewis H. Latimer.

The Lewis H. Latimer Fund, Inc. (formerly the committee to Save the Latimer House) became a non-profit in 1990 and has worked on restoring the house to it to its 1912–1928 condition, with renovations including removing the enclosed front porch, re-building Latimer's studio, and restoring the original layout of the interior rooms. The New York City Landmarks Preservation Commission designated the house as a landmark in 1995, following a hearing. The house received a $750,000 grant for upgrades in 2022, and a renovation was completed in June 2024.

== See also ==
- List of New York City Designated Landmarks in Queens
- National Register of Historic Places listings in Queens County, New York
