= Lewis Howard Latimer =

American inventor (1848–1928)

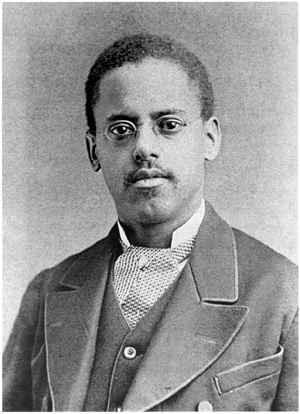
- Latimer in 1882
- Born: September 4, 1848; Chelsea, Massachusetts, U.S.
- Died: December 11, 1928 (aged 80); Flushing Queens, New York City, U.S.
- Occupations: Inventor; patent consultant; author; engineer; draftsman
- Spouse: Mary Wilson Lewis (m. 1873)
- Children: 2
- Parents: George Latimer; Rebecca Latimer
- Military career
- Allegiance: United States
- Branch: United States Navy
- Service years: 1864–1865
- Rank: Landsman
- Unit: USS Massasoit
- Conflicts: American Civil War

Lewis Howard Latimer (September 4, 1848 – December 11, 1928) was an American inventor and patent draftsman. His inventions included an evaporative air conditioner, an improved process for manufacturing carbon filaments for electric light bulbs, and an improved toilet system for railroad cars. In 1884, he joined the Edison Electric Light Company where he worked as a draftsman. The Lewis H. Latimer House, his landmarked former residence, is located near the Latimer Projects at 34–41 137th Street in Flushing, Queens, New York City.

== Early life and military service ==
Lewis Howard Latimer was born in Chelsea, Massachusetts, the youngest of four children of Rebecca Latimer (1823–1910) and George Latimer. Before his birth, his parents escaped from slavery in Virginia and fled to Boston in October 1842. Shortly after their arrival, George Latimer was arrested under the Fugitive Slave Act of 1793, and his case became a widely publicized abolitionist cause. Prominent antislavery figures, including Frederick Douglass and William Lloyd Garrison, publicly supported the effort to prevent his return to Virginia. George Latimer ultimately secured his freedom after a local Black minister, Samuel Caldwell, raised funds to purchase his release.

As a child, Latimer assisted his father in his barbershop. He also helped his father hang wallpaper in the evenings.

Following the Dred Scott decision in 1857, which held that enslaved people could not become free citizens by entering a free state, George Latimer—who lacked formal proof of his emancipation—left Massachusetts for his family’s safety. Rebecca Latimer separated the children, sending Lewis and his brothers to a state‑run farm school and placing his sisters with a family friend.

On September 16, 1864, at the age of sixteen, Latimer enlisted in the United States Navy and served as a Landsman aboard the USS Massasoit.

== Career ==
After receiving an honorable discharge from the U.S. Navy on July 3, 1865, he gained employment as an office boy with a patent law firm, Crosby Halstead and Gould, with a $3.00 per week salary. He learned how to use a set square, ruler, and other drafting tools. Later, after his boss recognized his talent for sketching patent drawings, Latimer was promoted to the position of head draftsman, earning $20 a week by 1872 (equivalent to $538 in 2025).

=== Inventions and technical work ===
In 1874, Latimer co-patented (with Charles M. Brown) an improved toilet system for railroad cars called the Water Closet for Railroad Cars (U.S. Patent 147,363).

In 1876, Alexander Graham Bell employed Latimer, then a draftsman at Bell's patent law firm, to draft the necessary drawings required to receive a patent for Bell's telephone.

In 1879, he moved to Bridgeport, Connecticut, and was hired as assistant manager and draftsman for the US Electric Lighting Co., a company owned by Hiram Maxim, a rival of Thomas Edison. While Latimer was there he invented a modification to the process for making carbon filaments which aimed to reduce breakages during the carbonization process. This modification consisted of placing filament blanks inside a cardboard envelope during carbonization. While in England on behalf of the Maxim light company, he taught the entire process for making Maxim lights, including glassblowing, in 9 months to get the factory up and running.

In 1884, he was invited to work with Thomas Edison. Along with the work he did with Edison, he was also responsible for translating data into German and French and for gathering that information.

Latimer also developed a forerunner of the air conditioner called "Apparatus for cooling and disinfecting".

In 1894, Latimer pursued a patent for a safety elevator that prevented riders from falling out of the elevator and into the shaft.

In 1924, after the Board of Patent Control dissolved, Latimer went on to work with Hammer and Schwartz until he retired.

=== Edison Pioneers ===
On February 11, 1918, Latimer joined the Edison Pioneers, becoming the first person of color to do so.

=== Light bulb ===
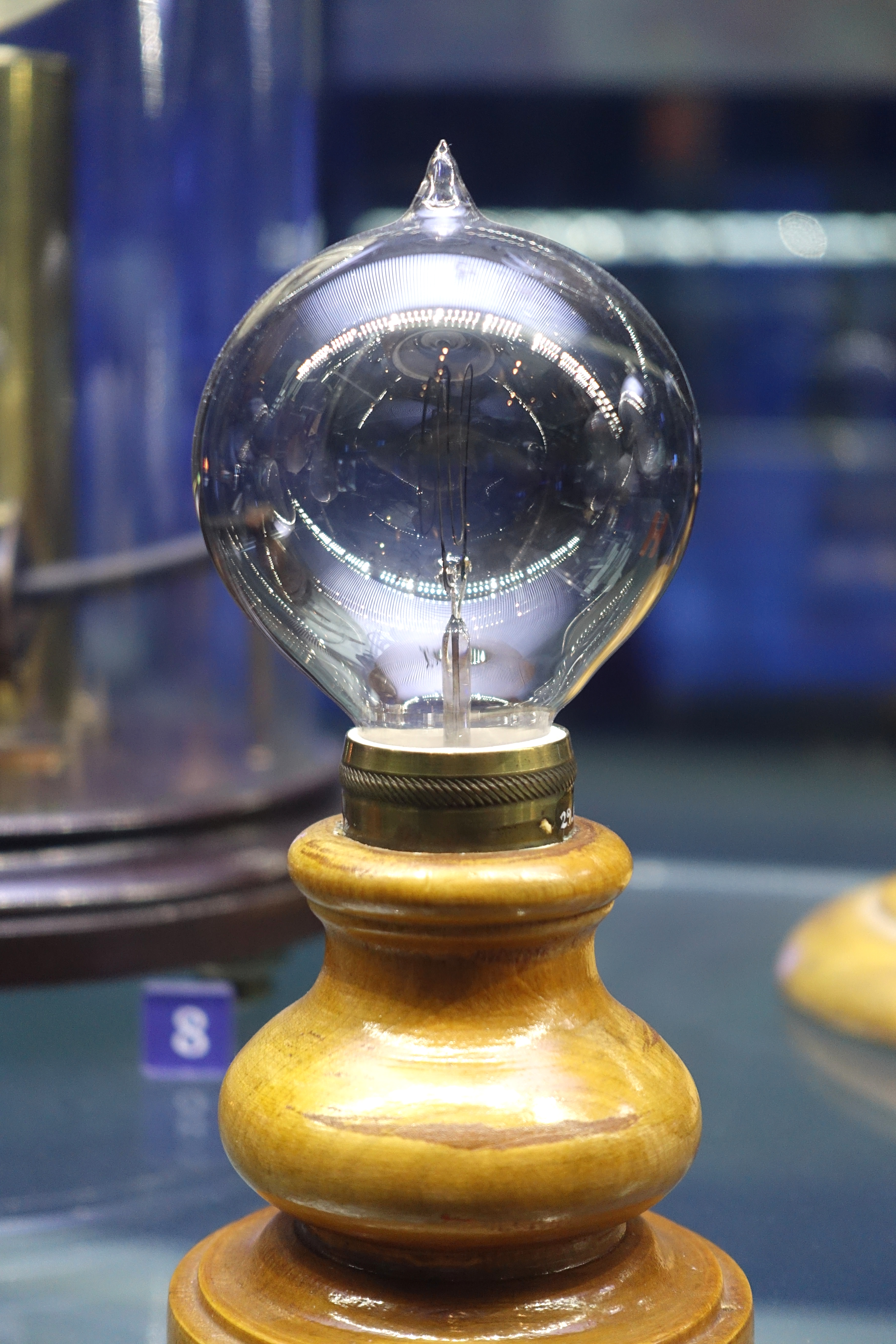
Light bulb by Lewis Latimer, 1883 - Museum of Science and Industry (Chicago)

Latimer received a patent on September 13, 1881, along with Joseph V. Nichols, for a method of attaching carbon filaments to conducting wires within an electric lamp, and another patent on January 17, 1882, for a "process of manufacturing carbons", a method for the production of carbon filaments for light bulbs which reduced breakages during the production process by wrapping the filaments in a cardboard envelope.

The Edison Electric Light Company in New York City hired Latimer in 1884 as a draftsman and an expert witness in patent litigation on electric lights. While at Edison, Latimer wrote the first book on electric lighting, entitled Incandescent Electric Lighting (1890), and supervised the installation of public electric lights throughout New York, Philadelphia, Montreal, and London.

When that company was combined with the Thomson-Houston Electric Company in 1892 to form General Electric, he continued to work in the legal department.

In 1911, he became a patent consultant to law firms.

=== Patents ===
- U.S. patent 147,363 "Improvement in water-closets for railroad-cars" (with Brown, Charles W.), February 10, 1874
- U.S. patent 247,097 "Electric lamp" (with Nichols, Joseph V.), September 13, 1881
- U.S. patent 252,386 "Process of Manufacturing Carbons", January 17, 1882
- U.S. patent 255,212 "Supporter for electric lamps" (with Tregoning, John), March 21, 1882
- U.S. patent 334,078 "Apparatus for cooling and disinfecting", January 12, 1886
- U.S. patent 557,076 "Locking rack for hats, coats, and umbrellas", March 24, 1896
- U.S. patent 781,890 "Book Supporter", February 7, 1905
- U.S. patent 968,787 "Lamp fixture" (with Norton, William Sheil), August 30, 1910

== Writing ==
- A book of poetry called Poems of Love and Life.
- A technical book, Incandescent Electric Lighting (1890).
- Various pieces for African-American journals.
- A petition to Mayor Seth Low to restore a member to the Brooklyn School Board.

== Other activities ==
Latimer taught English and mechanical drawing to immigrants at the Henry Street Settlement in New York, viewing education as an essential form of community uplift.

He was active in the arts; he played the violin and flute, painted portraits, wrote plays, and also composed poetry.

Latimer was also an early advocate for civil rights. In 1895, he contributed a written statement to the National Conference of Colored Men addressing issues of equality, security, and opportunity for African Americans.

Latimer remained active in veterans’ organizations even after his military service ended. He was an early and committed member of the Grand Army of the Republic. He served as secretary and adjutant within the organization. He was also a member of Prince Hall Freemasonry.

== Personal life ==
Latimer married Mary Wilson Lewis on November 15, 1873, in Fall River, Massachusetts. Mary was born in Providence, Rhode Island, the daughter of Louisa M. and William Lewis. The couple had two daughters, Emma Jeanette (1883–1978) and Louise Rebecca (1890–1963). Jeanette married Gerald Fitzherbert Norman, the first black person hired as a high school teacher in the New York City public school system, and had two children: Winifred Latimer Norman (1914–2014), a social worker who served as the guardian of her grandfather's legacy, and Gerald Latimer Norman (1911–1990), who became an administrative law judge.

In 1879, Latimer and his wife, Mary, moved to Bridgeport, Connecticut, along with his mother, Rebecca, and his brother, William. They settled in a neighborhood called "Little Liberia," which had been established in the early 19th century by free blacks. (The landmark Mary and Eliza Freeman Houses are the last surviving buildings on their original foundations of this community.) Other family members already living there were his brother, George A. Latimer, his wife, Jane, his sister, Margaret, and her husband, Augustus T. Hawley, and their children. Mary died in Bridgeport in 1924.

== Death and legacy ==
For 25 years, from 1903 until he died in 1928, Latimer lived with his family in a home on Holly Avenue in what is now known as the East Flushing section of Queens, New York. Latimer died on December 11, 1928, at the age of 80. Approximately sixty years after his death, his home was moved from Holly Avenue to 137th Street in Flushing, Queens, which is about 1.4 miles northwest of its original location.

- Latimer is an inductee of the National Inventors Hall of Fame for his work on electric filament manufacturing techniques.
- The Latimer family house is on Latimer Place in Flushing, Queens. It was moved from the original location to a nearby small park and turned into the Lewis H. Latimer House Museum in honor of the inventor.
- Latimer was a founding member of the Flushing, New York, Unitarian Church.
- A set of apartment houses in Flushing are called "Latimer Gardens".
- P.S. 56 in Clinton Hill, Brooklyn, is named Lewis H. Latimer School.
- An invention program at the Massachusetts Institute of Technology, MIT, is named after him.
- On May 10, 1968, a school in Brooklyn, New York was rededicated to The Lewis H. Latimer School in his memory.
- In 1988, a committee was formed, the Lewis H. Latimer Committee, to save his home in Flushing, New York.
- On September 23, 2023, a gravestone was dedicated to him at his grave in Fall River, Massachusetts.

== See also ==
- The Current War
