= George Latimer (escaped slave) =

American escaped enslaved person (1819–1897)

George Washington Latimer
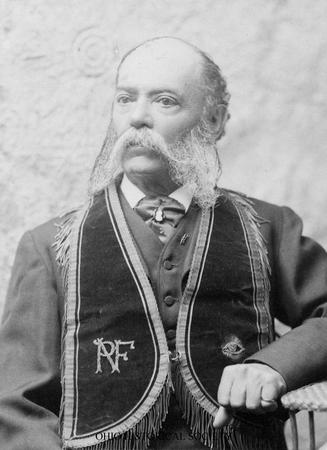
- Photograph by Reed Studio c. 1880
- Born: July 4, 1819; Norfolk, Virginia, U.S.
- Died: May 29, 1897 (aged 77); Lynn, Massachusetts, U.S.
- Spouse(s): Rebecca Latimer, Charlotte (Williams) Saunders, Mary (Turner) Williams
- Children: 4, including Lewis
- Parents: Mitchell Latimer; Margaret Olmsted

George Washington Latimer (July 4, 1819 – May 29, 1897) was an escaped slave whose case became a major political issue in Massachusetts.

== Early life ==
George Washington Latimer was born in Norfolk, Virginia. His father, Samuel Mitchell Latimer (c.1797-1875), was of a white, slave owning household, of Elizabeth City, Virginia. His mother, Margaret Olmsted, was enslaved by his uncle, Edward A. Latimer. In the early part of his life he was enslaved by a man named Edward Mallery and was a "domestic servant" until the age of sixteen. After that time, his labor was hired out and he primarily worked driving a dray and as a shopkeeper. On two separate occasions, he spent time in prison as a result of the debts of his enslaver. He was eventually sold to enslaver James B. Gray. Gray was a shop owner whose store Latimer manned. He abused Latimer and it is thought that this abuse in part precipitated Latimer's flight to Boston.

== Escape from slavery ==
On October 4, 1842, Latimer and his wife, Rebecca, who was pregnant at the time, ran away. The pair hid beneath the deck of a northbound ship that took them to Baltimore. From there they traveled to Philadelphia, with Rebecca posing as a servant to her lighter-skinned husband. At last, they made their way to Boston, arriving on either October 7 or 8th. James Gray offered a reward of $25 if Latimer was captured in Virginia and $50 plus expenses if he was captured outside Virginia. On the day George Latimer and Rebecca arrived in Boston, Latimer was recognized by a man named William R. Carpenter, a former employee of James Gray, who contacted Gray. On October 20, Latimer was arrested. The initial charge was larceny. Latimer was brought before Justice Joseph Story, who ordered that he be held.

== Imprisonment ==
After Latimer's arrest, word spread through the black community, and a group led by Henry G. Tracy attempted to rescue him. They were unsuccessful. Latimer's lawyer, Samuel Edmund Sewall, then sought a writ of personal replevin from Massachusetts Chief Justice Lemuel Shaw, who was known to have strong anti-slavery views. Sewall argued that Latimer should have the right to have his identity determined by a jury. This attempt at freeing Latimer, however, also failed, as Shaw denied the writ. According to the abolitionist paper The Liberator, Shaw said that it was a federal matter and the Constitution and the laws of Congress "were to be obeyed, however disagreeable to our natural sympathies or views of duty."

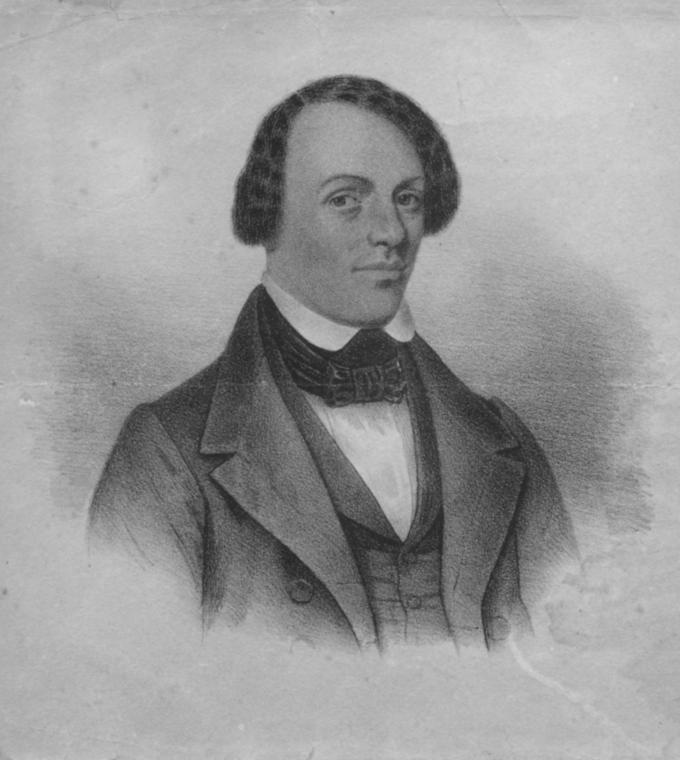
Lithograph by Thayer & Co. (Boston, Mass.)

Latimer's arrest resulted in an uproar so great that "Boston was, without a doubt, the most potentially violent city in America." The case brought about an immense public response in the state of Massachusetts. Latimer's counsel, Sewell, chaired a meeting at Faneuil Hall where attendees not only vowed resistance to slave-catching but also voted for disunion. Additional meetings were held throughout the state, called "Latimer Meetings." These meetings included both black and white abolitionists.

The Latimer and North Star Journal was created by the men appointed to the newly formed Latimer Committee, Henry Ingersoll Bowditch, William Francis Channing, and Frederick Cabot. Issues came out every other day. The Latimer Journal reported that the social unrest related to Latimer's imprisonment was such that "fire and bloodshed threatened in every direction."

A major development that occurred as a result of Latimer's arrest was the Latimer Committee's creation of two separate petitions, the "Great Massachusetts Petition" and the "Great Petition to Congress." The former requested a law banning the involvement of state officials or public property in the detention or arrest of suspected fugitives. The latter demanded that laws be passed severing any connection between Massachusetts and slavery. Latimer's freedom was purchased while these petition drives were still ongoing, but they had a considerable impact. The petition delivered to the State Assembly contained 64,526 signatures and weighed 150 pounds by the time it was delivered on February 17, 1843. This petition was a significant contribution to the passage of the 1843 Liberty Act, dubbed the "Latimer Law", which prevented Massachusetts officials from assisting in the detention of suspected fugitive enslaved people and banned the use of state facilities to detain such suspects. The petition to Congress, delivered to John Quincy Adams was less successful, with no legislation resulting from it.

Latimer's arrest spurred other action as well. It was the "immediate impetus" for the organization of the New England Freedom Association and increased collective action in the black community of Massachusetts. One example of this is the fundraising efforts that helped raise the money that was eventually used to purchase Latimer. These meetings were addressed by such abolitionists as Frederick Douglass and Charles Lenox Remond.

Latimer's freedom was eventually purchased from Gray for $400 (equivalent to $13,821 in 2025).

== Post-freedom ==
After his freedom was purchased, George Latimer remained involved in the abolitionist cause, attending anti-slavery conventions and helping to gather signatures for the two petitions that were started while he was imprisoned.

There is not a great deal of information available about Latimer's life as a free man. He continued to be involved in, and connected to, the abolitionist movement. In 1851 he was involved in the rescue of an escaped enslaved person, Shadrach Minkins, when he was paid to keep Minkins's owner under surveillance.

Latimer's primary occupation was as a paperhanger and he worked in this capacity for forty-five years in Lynn, Massachusetts. The first of the Latimer's four children was born shortly after his freedom was purchased. The youngest, Lewis Howard Latimer, who was born in 1848, went on to become an inventor, and worked for such prominent inventors as Alexander Graham Bell and Thomas Edison.

== Death ==
Latimer died on May 29, 1897, in Lynn, Massachusetts.
