= Anthony Burns =

American escaped slave

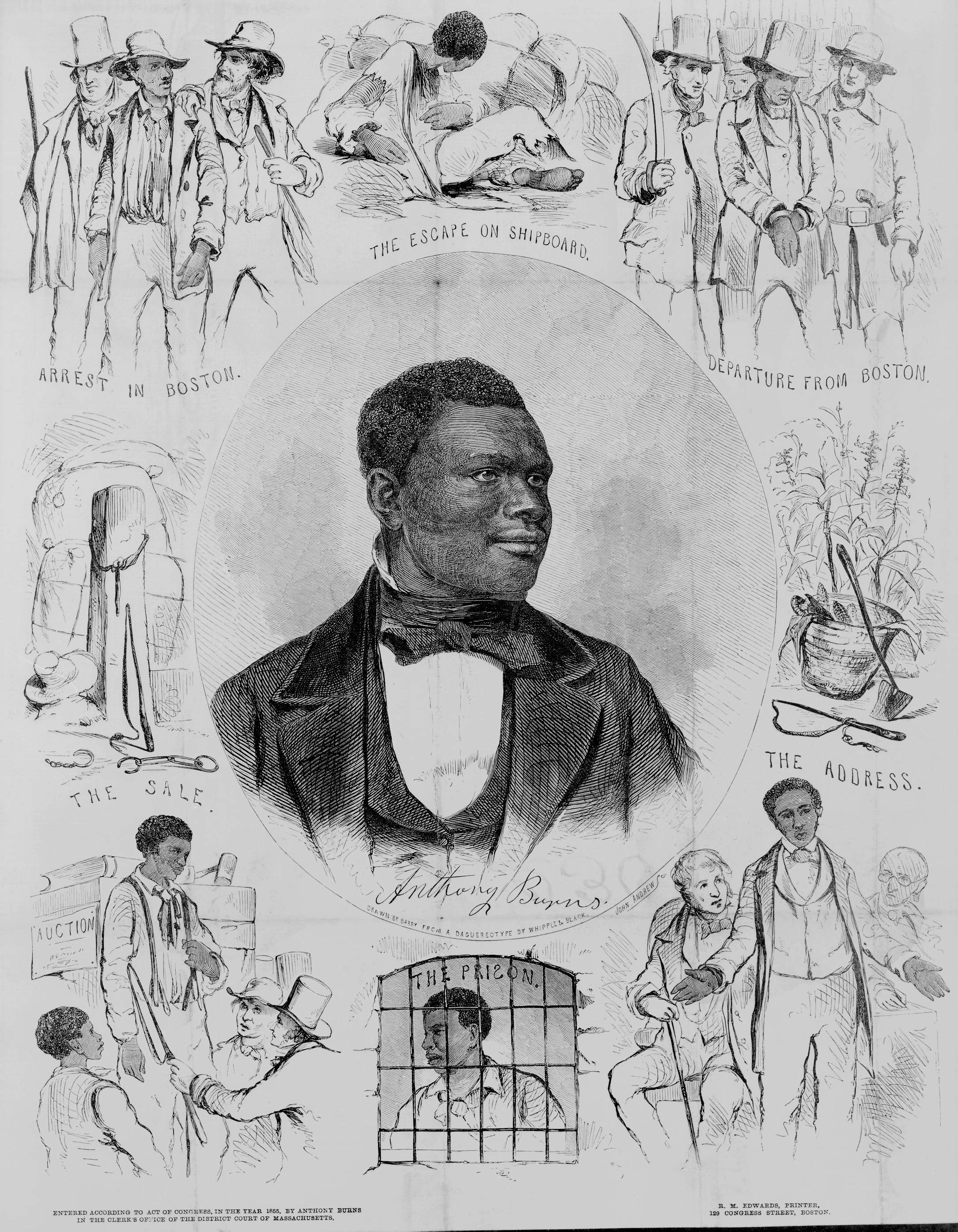
- A bust portrait of the twenty-four-year-old Anthony Burns, "Drawn by Barry from a daguereotype [sic] by Whipple and Black," is surrounded by scenes from his life.
- Born: May 31, 1834; Stafford County, VA
- Died: July 17, 1862 (aged 28); St. Catharines, Canada
- Resting place: Saint Catharines Cemetery

Anthony Burns (May 31, 1834 – July 17, 1862) was an African-American man who escaped from slavery in Virginia in 1854. His capture and trial in Boston, and transport back to Virginia, generated wide-scale public outrage in the North and increased support for abolition.

Burns was born enslaved in Stafford County, Virginia. As a young man, he became a Baptist and a "slave preacher" at the Falmouth Union Church in Falmouth, Virginia. He was frequently hired out by his master and learned to read and write in his various assignments. In 1853, he escaped from slavery and reached the free state of Massachusetts. He started working in Boston.

The following year, he was captured under the Fugitive Slave Act of 1850 and tried in court in Boston. The Fugitive Slave Act was despised and fiercely resisted in Boston, and Burns's case attracted national publicity, including large demonstrations, protests, attacks, and violence. Federal troops were used in the city to ensure Burns was transported without interference to a ship sailing to Virginia post-trial.

Burns was eventually ransomed from slavery, with his freedom purchased by Boston sympathizers. He was educated at Oberlin Collegiate Institute and became a Baptist preacher. He was called to a position in Upper Canada (Ontario), where an estimated 30,000 refugee African Americans, both enslaved and free, had fled, to gain or retain their freedom. He lived and worked there until his death.

== Early life ==
Anthony Burns was born enslaved in Stafford County, Virginia, on May 31, 1834. His mother was the slave of a certain John Suttle and served as a cook for the Suttle family. She bore 13 children in total, and Anthony was her youngest. Anthony's father was rumored to be a free man who worked as a supervisor in a quarry in Virginia who later died from stone dust inhalation.

Burns's master, John Suttle, died shortly after Anthony’s birth. His widowed wife took over his estate and sold Burns’s older siblings in order to prevent bankruptcy. Eventually, Burns’s mother was also sold, or rented out to some other family. Anthony did not see her for two years, when Mrs. Suttle went to collect the revenue from her being hired out as a laborer. When Anthony was six years old, Mrs. Suttle died. Her property, including Anthony, was inherited by her eldest son, Charles F. Suttle.

In order to repay the family’s existing debts, Charles mortgaged his slaves and continued his mother’s financial practices to prevent further bankruptcy. During this time, Burns began his earliest tasks while enslaved. Burns looked after his niece so that his sister was available for labor, and stayed at the House of Horton where his sister lived and worked. Here, Burns was introduced to education by the children who lived there; they taught Burns the alphabet in exchange for small services.

At the age of 7, Burns was hired out to three single women (referred to as maidens in the historic text) to work for $15 a year, paid to his master. His jobs included running necessary errands and collecting their weekly supply of cornmeal from the nearby mill. It was during this time that Burns was first exposed to religion. At the age of 8, Burns went to work for $25 a year and was again offered a chance to learn. In this job, the children taught Burns how to spell through their own spelling worksheets from school; in return, Anthony performed antics for their entertainment. Burns worked in this capacity for two years and left due to poor treatment.

Burns was next leased by William Brent. Brent was the husband of a rich young woman, and lived off her wealth, including the labor of numerous slaves. His wife was extremely kind to Anthony and he stayed there for two years, earning Suttle a total of $100. Under Brent’s supervision, Anthony learned about a land up North where black people were not enslaved. He began dreaming of his escape and freedom. Anthony refused to remain under Brent’s employment for a third year, although Suttle was satisfied with this position. Suttle humored Burns’s wishes to find his own employment, since he knew it was worth more to have a willing slave than many reluctant slaves.

Anthony entered the hiring ground to find a new master under a lease hire arrangement. Eventually, Suttle entered negotiations with Foote, who wanted Anthony to work in his saw-mill for $75 a year. Anthony was 12–13 years old at this time, and did not want to remain enslaved. In his new capacity, Anthony continued his education with Foote’s daughter, but otherwise dealt with many cruelties. Foote and his wife proved to be Anthony’s severest owners, and beat even their youngest slaves without sympathy. Some 2–3 months into his service, Anthony mangled his hand in the wheel after Foote turned it on without prior warning. Anthony was discharged because of the injury and was returned to live with Suttle as he recovered.

While recovering from the injury to his hand, Anthony had a religious awakening, that superseded other experiences. Simultaneously, Millerism was introduced to his small county in Virginia, and Burns was excited by the religious fervor as it spread. Suttle refused his request to be baptized, saying that Anthony would turn to sin if he joined the Church.

However, after Anthony returned to his employment under Foote, Suttle gave Anthony permission to get baptized. Suttle took Anthony to the Baptist Church in Falmouth, which accepted everyone in its congregation. During mass (communion), the free whites and enslaved blacks were separated by a partition. Two years later, Anthony was given the chance to preach to a group of church members and appointed as a preacher at this church. Anthony used this new position to preach exclusively to assemblies of enslaved persons, although Virginia nominally required all-black congregations to be supervised by a white minister. According to Anthony, if a law officer discovered the blacks in their meeting, any enslaved persons who did not escape would be put into cages and given 39 lashes the following day. Additionally, Anthony performed marriages and funerals for enslaved persons as a preacher.

As previously mentioned, Anthony returned to Foote’s employment after his hand healed. He finished his year of service and was hired by a new master in Falmouth, Virginia, where his church was located. His new master loaned Burns to a merchant for six months of his year of service. Burns was treated horribly by that man, so he refused to remain with the lessee after his year of service was completed.

For the next year, Anthony moved to Fredericksburg, Virginia, where he worked under a tavern-keeper. He earned $100 for his master by this service. A year later, Anthony went to work in an apothecary in the same city. He met a fortune teller who promised him freedom within the next few months.

A short time later, Suttle hired William Brent (Anthony’s former master) to manage hiring out his slaves for fees each year. Brent moved Anthony to Richmond, Virginia at the end of his year of service. The young man was excited to work in a city with ships that sailed down the James River and then through the Chesapeake Bay to the North. In Richmond, Brent hired Anthony out to his brother-in-law, whom Anthony did not get along with. By this time, Anthony was skilled at reading and writing, especially compared to other slaves. With his knowledge, he set up a makeshift school to teach slaves of all ages how to read and write; this was kept secret from their masters in Richmond. At the end of his year of service with Brent’s brother-in-law, Burns was employed by a man named Millspaugh.

Millspaugh quickly realized that he did not have enough work for Anthony to earn a profit on him, so he set Anthony out into the city to work small jobs and earn money for him. Although they originally set up a daily meeting, they changed it to meet up once every two weeks since Anthony only made a small sum, if any, each day. In his job search, Anthony was pushed to escape by the sailors and freemen he worked with. The only thing holding him back was a sense of religious duty towards his owner, but he justified his escape with the Biblical Epistle to Philemon and eliminated any religious qualms he had with leaving. In one of their biweekly meetings, Anthony gave Millspaugh $25 as his earnings that month, and after being presented with such a large sum, his master required Anthony to visit him daily. Anthony refused and walked out on his master without his consent, thus making his escape much more pressing than it would have been if he had had two weeks to plan and execute it. Anthony devised a plan with a sailor friend he met during his work on a vessel in the harbor, and one morning in early February 1854, Anthony boarded the vessel that would take him to the North.

== Flight from slavery and capture ==
We went to bed one night old-fashioned, conservative, compromise Union Whigs & waked up stark mad Abolitionists.

— Amos Adams Lawrence, Conscience Whig, on the Anthony Burns affair, 1854

Anthony Burns left Richmond, Virginia, one early February morning in 1854. His friend stowed him away in a small compartment on the ship, and Anthony immediately fell asleep after days of anxious and long nights. Upon waking up, the ship was already miles out of the harbor and on its way to Norfolk, Virginia and then headed to Boston, Massachusetts. On the journey, Burns was stuck in the same position and in the same compartment without room for movement for a little over three weeks. In that time, he suffered from dehydration, starvation, and extreme sea sickness. His friend brought him food and water every three to four days, and it was just enough for Anthony to survive the trip to Boston.

The vessel reached Boston in late February or early March (the exact date is unknown), and Burns immediately began seeking new employment. At first, Anthony found a job as a cook on a ship, but was dismissed after one week since he could not make his bread rise. Next, Burns found employment under Collin Pitts, a colored man, in a clothing store on Brattle Street. However, Anthony only enjoyed one month of freedom in this capacity before being arrested.

While in Boston, Anthony sent a letter to his enslaved brother in Richmond and revealed his new home in Boston. His brother’s owner discovered the letter and conveyed the news of Burns's escape to Suttle. Suttle went to a courthouse in Alexandria County, where the judge ruled that Suttle had enough proof that he owned Burns and could issue a warrant for his arrest under the Fugitive Slave Act of 1850. The warrant was issued on May 24, 1854, and stated that Watson Freeman, the United States Marshal of Massachusetts, was required to arrest Anthony Burns and bring him before Judge Edward G. Loring to stand trial. On the same day, Deputy Marshal Asa O. Butman, an infamous slave hunter, was charged with the execution of the warrant.

On May 24, 1854, Butman scouted out Burns in the clothing store and then arrested him. His goal was to make a peaceful arrest in order to not incite mob violence and have the mob rescue Burns before he could be returned to the South. After Burns and Pitts closed down their store, they walked separate ways to go home. While walking, Butman stopped Burns at the corner of the Court and Hanover street intersection and arrested him under the guise of a jewel store robbery. Burns, knowing he was innocent of that crime, complied with Butman and peacefully walked with him to the courthouse. At the courthouse, Burns expected to be confronted by the jewelry store owner, but was instead met with U.S. Marshal Freeman. In this moment, Burns knew he had been caught under the Fugitive Slave Act of 1850.

== Trial ==
By the first day of the trial, the prosecutors had succeeded in keeping the trial hidden from the public. However, Richard Henry Dana Jr. was passing by the courthouse an hour before the initial examination and heard about the proceedings of the day. Immediately, Dana entered the courthouse to talk to Burns and offer him his professional help. Initially Burns declined, citing it would be of no use, but reluctantly agreed due to Dana’s insistence.

In the initial hearing, the plaintiff (Charles Suttle) put William Brent on the stand to verify Burns's identity along with Suttle’s testimony. Brent was asked to recall his conversation with Burns and Suttle the previous night right after Burns's arrest, but Dana intervened on behalf of Burns and got the evidence thrown out for the time being. At the end of the hearing, commissioner Loring agreed to push further proceedings back to May 27, but they were again delayed until the 29th due to Burns's late appointment of counsel. In an interview, Theodore Parker, witness to the trial, cited that Burns's hesitancy to accept counsel came from fear over how well Brent and Suttle knew him.

During the duration of the trial, Burns was kept in a jury-room under constant surveillance of armed guards. In this time, the guards tried to provoke and trick Anthony into slipping up and admitting to his status as a slave, but Burns evaded their tactics. The closest Burns came to self-admission was at the provocation of Suttle, who was outraged the public saw him as a harsh and abusive master to Anthony. Suttle asked Anthony to write a letter proving the contrary, but Leonard Grimes, a Boston clergyman and abolitionist, had Burns destroy the letter after seeing it as evidence to be used against him in the trial.

The final examination began on May 29, 1854. Armed soldiers lined the windows of the courthouse and prevented all officials and citizens from entering the courtroom. Even Dana, Burns's senior counsel, couldn’t enter the courtroom until late into the examination. Thus, Charles Ellis, Burns's junior counsel, was forced to begin the examination by arguing that it was unfit to continue while Suttle’s counsel carried firearms, but Loring rejected this sentiment. During the plaintiff’s argument, Loring approved their request to present the conversation between Suttle and Burns as evidence from the night of his arrest. As their final piece of evidence, they admitted the book that contained the Virginia court’s ruling in favor of Suttle.

When Burns's counsel presented their defense, they focused on proving that Suttle’s timeline was off and they lacked sufficient evidence to show Burns was the slave who had run away. They brought in William Jones, a colored man who testified that he had met Anthony on the first day of March and described his relationship to Anthony through their time together in Boston. In addition, the counsel knew that the commissioner would be hesitant to accept the testimony of a colored man, so they called up 7 other witnesses to validate his story. As one of the witnesses, the counsel called up James Whittemore, a city council member of Boston. Whittemore testified that he had seen Burns in Boston around March 8, and identified him by his scars as proof.

In Loring’s final decision, he admitted that he thought the Fugitive Slave Act was a disgrace, but his job was to uphold the law. Loring stated that Suttle produced sufficient evidence to prove the fugitive slave Suttle described matched Anthony’s appearance, thus he ruled in favor of Suttle.

It has been estimated the government's cost of capturing and conducting Burns through the trial was upwards of $40,000 (equivalent to $1,433,000 in 2025) or $100,000 according to James M. McPherson.

== Riot at the Courthouse ==
Among the citizens interested in Burns's trial was the Committee of Vigilance, which was founded after the passage of the Fugitive Slave Act of 1850. The goal of the group was to prevent the execution of the Act for fugitives in Burns's position. It was effective due to the diversity of its ranks, ranging from people of every socioeconomic status and race. In Burns's case, the committee debated between two courses of actions: attacking the courthouse to forcibly rescue Anthony, and creating a crowd when they removed Burns from the courthouse to act as an immovable barrier. Between these two propositions, the committee ruled to go forth with the second and more peaceful plan, and additionally posted men at the courthouse to make sure the officials did not try to move Burns without their knowledge.

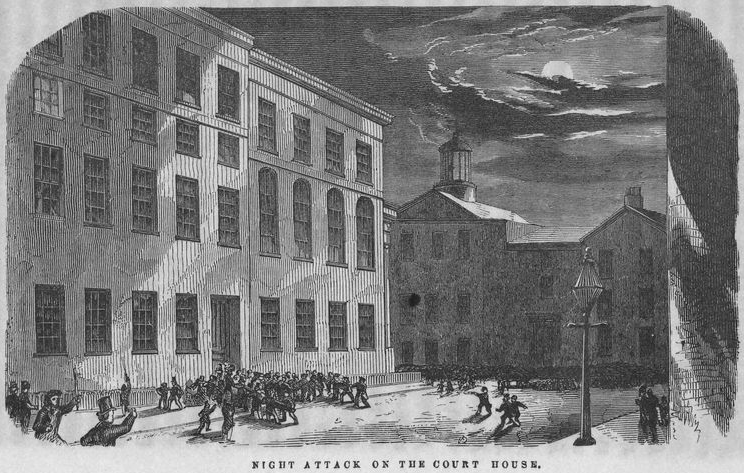
The night of the riot at the courthouse, with Burns's cell indicated by the light in the top left window.

Although the committee agreed to go ahead with the peaceful plan, a faction of men planned to rescue Burns from the courthouse themselves. On Friday evening, May 26, the entire committee dispersed from their meeting in Faneuil Hall at around 9 p.m., when the men planned to hold their assault. By that time in the evening, they had gathered at least 25 men, all armed with various weapons such as revolvers and axes. The crowd picked up members from the committee meeting as they made their way to the courthouse, and began their attack by breaking down the doors with axes and wooden construction beams. After breaking into the courthouse, a fight broke out between the guards and rioters, and resulted in the death of one of the guards, James Batchelder.

The riot did not get far after the police arrived as back-up, resulting in the arrest of many abolitionists. However, it is highly unlikely the attack would have been successful in rescuing Anthony since he was held in an extremely secure room in the top floor of the courthouse.

A grand jury indicted three of those involved in the attack at the courthouse. After an acquittal of one man and several hung juries in trials for the others, the federal government dropped the charges.

After the riot, President Franklin Pierce sent the United States Marines to Boston to aid the police in preventing more violence. Following the riot, the entire city of Boston was excited and awaiting the next phase of the trial. Once Loring’s decision was announced in favor of Suttle, the abolitionists began their preparations for Burns's movement.

== Aftermath ==
Following the trial, Marshal Freeman was tasked with successfully moving Burns from the courthouse without interference from the crowd in Boston. Jerome V. C. Smith, the mayor of Boston, was responsible for maintaining a peaceful crowd. With this news, the citizens of Boston set up interviews and tried to persuade the mayor to join their side of the cause and free Burns. Initially, the crowd succeeded in convincing the mayor to only implement one military company to guard the courthouse the day Burns was moved. Like Loring, Smith was against the Fugitive Slave Act of 1850, but did not feel as strongly about upholding it. Despite the mayor’s orders, Marshal Freeman felt as if one company would not be enough to maintain order while Burns was moved, and pushed the mayor to call in more troops. Mayor Smith ended up implementing an entire brigade of state militia to help clear the streets on the day of Burns's transfer.

While the mayor was planning for crowd control, Freeman put together a band of 125 citizens of Boston to help move Burns. The Marshal swore these men in and armed them with various weapons, such as pistols and cutlasses. From the date of Loring’s decision until his departure on June 2, Burns was kept in the same jury room he was in during the trial. Throughout this time, Burns's friends began making plans to purchase his freedom and no matter how much money they offered, Suttle refused to negotiate as long as Burns was under his service.

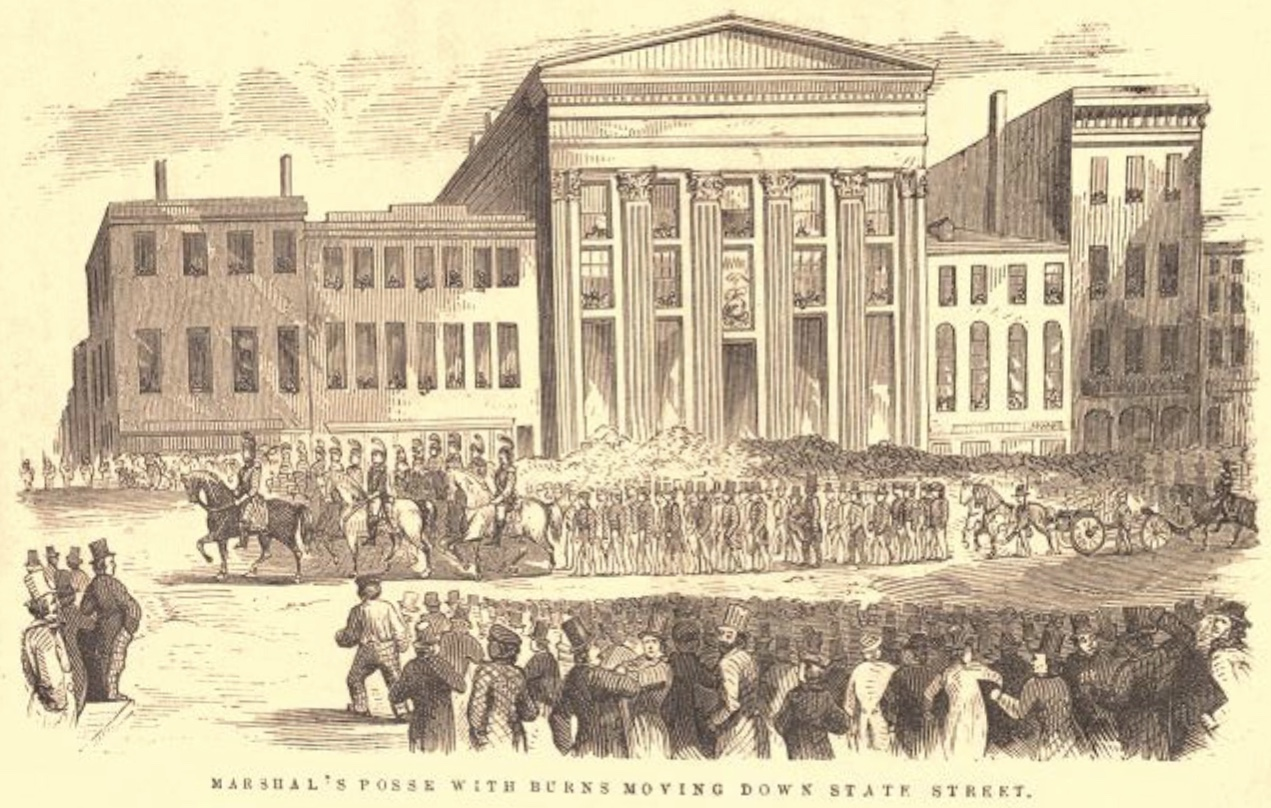
Marshal's posse with Burns moving down State Street

At 2 p.m. on June 2, 1854, Burns was escorted from the courthouse by Marshal Freeman and his men, along with an additional 140 U.S. Marines and infantrymen. State militia brigades lined the streets to keep the crowd at bay and to prevent any interference with the procession. Along their route, citizens left symbols to indicate the funeral of Burns's liberty and freedom. One man suspended a black coffin and others draped their windows to show Burns they stood with him. At one point in their route, the guards made an unexpected turn into a road lined with spectators. The officers ran at them with bayonets and beat their way through the line of bystanders. One man, William Ela, was beaten with muskets down on the pavement, cut in the face, and put into confinement. Eventually, the officers and Burns reached the wharf where the vessel headed to Virginia was scheduled to depart from Boston. At 3:20 p.m., Suttle, Brent, and Burns left Boston for Virginia.

As a result of Burns's trial, Massachusetts passed the most progressive personal liberty law the nation had seen up until 1854. The law stated that slave claimants were not allowed to be on state property, fugitive slaves were required to have a trial by jury, and slave claimants had to produce two credible and unbiased witnesses to prove the evidence in their case. Burns's trial was the last rendition hearing for a fugitive slave in Massachusetts. Additionally, Loring suffered severe consequences at the hands of abolitionists in Boston. Harvard University refused to re-hire Loring in his faculty position in their school, and the Massachusetts legislature voted to remove Loring from his state position as a probate judge, but the governor never approved the removal. However, in 1857, a new governor was elected to the position and signed Loring’s removal address. This action prompted severe anger from politicians in Washington, D.C., and President James Buchanan appointed Loring to the Federal Court of Claims when a position became open.

== Freedom and later life ==
After leaving Massachusetts, Burns spent four months in a Richmond jail where he was prohibited from being in contact with other slaves. In November, Suttle sold Burns to David McDaniel for $905 and McDaniel brought Burns to his plantation in Rocky Mount, North Carolina. As an owner, McDaniel was a firm and strong businessman, who constantly sold and traded his slaves. He had as few as 75 slaves on his plantation and as many as 150 slaves at other times. Burns was employed to be McDaniel’s coachman and stable-keeper, which was a relatively light workload compared to that of other slaves on the plantations. Instead of lodging with the other slaves, Burns received an office and ate meals in his master’s house. Due to this level of respect, Burns vowed never to run away from McDaniel as long as he was his master.

In addition to Burns’s level of care as a slave, Burns attended church twice while serving four months under McDaniel. Burns even held illegal religious meetings for his fellow slaves. Although discovered by McDaniel, the master did not punish Burns as he would have another slave. The overseer on the plantation resented Burns getting such special treatment, and threatened him with a pistol during one of their quarrels. Burns reported only to McDaniel as his supervisor and recognized only his orders. During these months of enslavement, Burns failed to notify his Northern friends of his location in the South.

One afternoon, Burns drove his mistress to a neighbor’s house. In the outing, a neighbor recognized Burns as the slave who had caused commotion with his trial in the North. A young lady overheard the neighbor recalling the story, and repeated it in a letter to her sister in Massachusetts. Her sister, after receiving the letter, told the story to her social circle, including Reverend Stockwell, who told Leonard Grimes. He was a known abolitionist who had spent his life helping fugitive slaves escape from Washington, D.C. Later he built the Church of Fugitive Slaves in Boston. Stockwell wrote to McDaniel to begin negotiations for Burns’s purchase, and McDaniel responded, saying he would sell Burns for $1300. In the two weeks before they left for Baltimore to meet McDaniel and Burns, Grimes collected sufficient funds for Burns’s purchase, while Stockwell covered the expenses for their journey. Grimes departed by himself after Stockwell failed to show up.

McDaniel knew he was going against public sentiment in North Carolina by selling Burns to the Northerners, so he swore Anthony to secrecy. On their train to Norfolk, Virginia, a confidant of McDaniel spread the rumor that the fugitive slave notorious from Boston was on board the train. Many passengers and even the conductor were outraged. The latter said he would not have let Burns onboard if he had known who he was. McDaniel held firm and kept the crowd at bay in their journey. When they arrived in Norfolk, Burns boarded their ship to Baltimore before McDaniel did. There he encountered another curious, unruly crowd. When McDaniel arrived, the crowd's anger was directed at him. Some men tried to buy Burns for more money than Grimes was paying for his freedom. McDaniel refused but compromised with the crowd by agreeing to sell Burns if the purchasers never arrived.

In Baltimore, Burns and McDaniel met Grimes at Barnum’s Hotel. They arrived two hours after Grimes, and immediately began negotiations. The payment was delayed after McDaniel demanded cash instead of the cheque Grimes produced. Eventually, the cash was exchanged, and Anthony’s freedom was purchased. Upon leaving the hotel, Grimes and Burns met Stockwell at the entrance. He accompanied the men to the train station. Burns spent his first night as a free man in Philadelphia.

Anthony Burns reached Boston in early March, where he was met with a public celebration of his freedom. Eventually, Burns enrolled at Oberlin College with a scholarship. He entered a seminary in Cincinnati to continue religious studies.

After briefly preaching in Indianapolis, Burns moved to St. Catharines, Ontario, Canada in 1860 to accept a call from Zion Baptist Church. Thousands of African Americans had migrated to Canada as refugees from slavery in the antebellum years, establishing communities in Ontario.

Burns died from tuberculosis on July 17, 1862.Anthony Burns Elementary School, which opened in 2006 was named after him.

== See also ==
- Slavery in Massachusetts, Henry David Thoreau's reaction to the Burns trial
- List of slaves

== Work cited ==
- McPherson, James (1988). Battle Cry of Freedom. Oxford University Press. ISBN 9780195038637.
- Stevens, Charles (1856). Anthony Burns: A History. Boston, Massachusetts: John P. Jewett and Company.
