= Henry Ingersoll Bowditch =

American physician

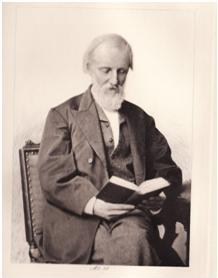
- Born: August 9, 1808; Salem, Massachusetts, U.S.
- Died: January 14, 1892 (aged 83); Boston, Massachusetts, U.S.
- Occupation: Physician
- Known for: Abolitionism
- Relatives: Nathaniel Bowditch (father), William I. Bowditch (brother), Charles Pickering Bowditch (nephew), Henry Pickering Bowditch (nephew)

Henry Ingersoll Bowditch (August 9, 1808 – January 14, 1892) was an American physician and a prominent Christian abolitionist. Bowditch was born on August 9, 1808, in Salem, Massachusetts to Nathaniel Bowditch, a renowned mathematician. He graduated from Harvard College in 1828, earned his medical degree there in 1832, and afterwards studied medicine in Paris for 2 years with leading physicians of the day. From 1859 to 1867 Bowditch was Jackson professor of clinical medicine at Harvard; he later founded the Massachusetts State Board of Health. Bowditch was a fellow of the American Academy of Public Health and wrote a seminal textbook on the subject, Public Hygiene in America (1876).

== Early life and introduction to abolitionism ==
While in England in 1833, Bowditch observed the funeral of William Wilberforce, "a great and constant advocate for the abolition of slavery" (Bowditch, 55). Shortly after returning to Boston from Europe, Bowditch observed the attempted lynching of William Lloyd Garrison and declared himself an abolitionist. Bowditch thereafter received the customary ostracism of society and close friends who "would even stare and scowl without speaking when we met after I had openly declared myself as one of the hated Abolitionists" (Bowditch 101). Bowditch's medical practice also lost business as a consequence of his abolitionism; however Bowditch remained in the movement.

Bowditch was an active, passionate abolitionist. He gave lectures and kept company with abolitionist leaders such as Charles Sumner, Charles C. Emerson, and Frederick Douglass. After briefly participating in Warren Street Chapel, a charity for impoverished children, Bowditch left the institution because of his conviction that their policy of exclusively serving white children was incompatible with his principles. Bowditch resented such culture-driven racist religious institutions, and proclaimed that his "soul arose indignant...to the whole race of priestly sycophants" who refused to combat racism and slavery (115).

== Radical abolitionist action ==
He also took action in association with the fugitive slave cause. With William Francis Channing, Bowditch became a founding member of the Latimer Committee and an editor of The Latimer Journal. Each was created in response to the plight of George Latimer, an apprehended fugitive slave in danger of deportation back South. Bowditch's efforts led to a massive petitioning of the Massachusetts General Court that resulted in legislation forbidding the use of state and municipal jails from detaining fugitive slaves, a blow to slave-hunters. However, Bowditch was also a witness to a vast number of unjust fugitive deportations.

His response was the organization of the Anti-Man-Hunting League. This radical organization trained members to capture and hold slave-hunters in exchange for the ransom of a fugitive slave's freedom. Although the league was given no opportunity to prove its efficacy, this society was useful both in uniting anti-slavery men, and preparing their paradigms for the violent opposition of slavery manifested in the Civil War. He was also a member of the Boston Vigilance Committee, an organization that assisted fugitive slaves.

After the Civil War, Bowditch kept ties with the movement by contributing to the historical discussion of abolitionism by providing an interpretation of historical abolitionism that was sympathetic to the plight of John Brown.

== Contributions to medicine and public health ==
Bowditch also made significant contributions to the fields of science and public health. He introduced inductive reasoning into American medical science, popularized the stethoscope, contributed to the understanding of tuberculosis, and laid the groundwork for public health by chairing the Massachusetts State Board of Health. He published Preventive Medicine and the Physician of the Future to propagate inductive reasoning as well as Public Hygiene in America to explain the concepts behind State Health. He also served as president of the American Medical Association.

During the Civil War his son Nathaniel died after suffering wounds and after a long abandonment on the battlefield. Bowditch turned his son's death in a cause célèbre by publishing a pamphlet and helping creating public awareness on the necessity of establishing a regular ambulance service, something that was achieved by the Union Army during the last year of the war, and something that helped extend to the whole Union the "Letterman system" of care for the wounded.

== Personal life ==
Bowditch married Olivia Yardley on July 17, 1838. They had four children, Nathaniel Bowditch (1839–1863), Olivia Yardley Bowditch (1842–1928), Edward Bowditch (1847–1929), and Vincent Yardley Bowditch (1852–1929).
