= Eva Channing =

American suffragist

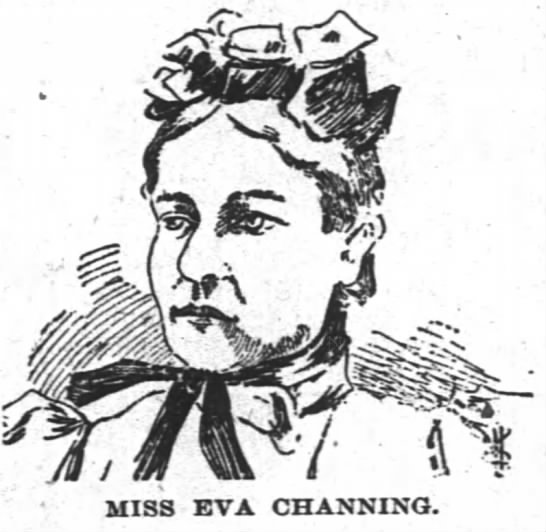
- Born: 1854; Boston
- Died: 1930 (aged 75–76); North Carolina
- Occupation: Suffragist
- Parent(s): William Francis Channing

Eva Channing (1854–1930) was a Boston area suffragist leader and writer.

== Early life ==
Eva Channing was born in 1854 to parents William Francis Channing and Susan Elizabeth Burdick Channing. Her mother was also active in the suffrage movement, and her grandfather, William Ellery Channing, was a well-known Unitarian minister. Eva Channing attended Boston University as a member of the class of 1877.

== Career ==
Channing served in a number of Boston area suffrage organizations, including the Massachusetts Woman Suffrage Association and the Massachusetts School Suffrage Association. In addition, she wrote frequent contributions to the Women's Journal, advocating for women's rights in both Europe, particularly Germany, and the United States.
