= Joseph Hale Abbot =

American educator (1802–1873)

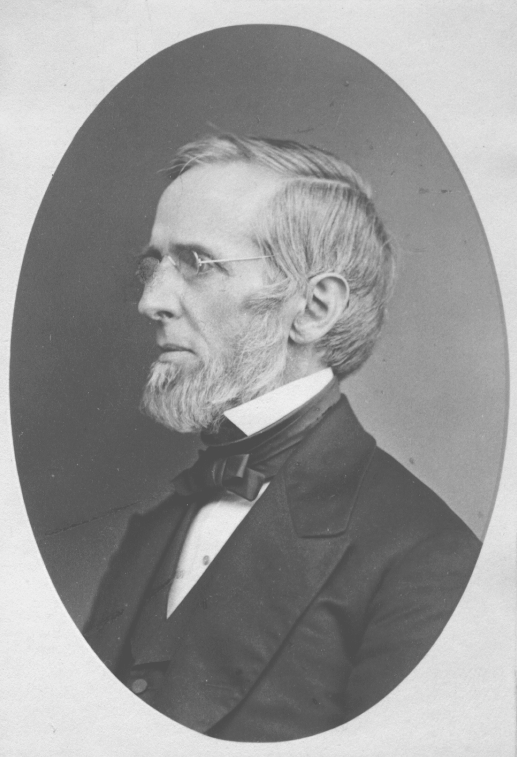
- Born: September 26, 1802; Wilton
- Died: April 7, 1873; Cambridge
- Education: Bowdoin College
- Awards: Fellow of the American Academy of Arts and Sciences

Joseph Hale Abbot (September 26, 1802 – April 7, 1873) was an American educator, inventor, and science writer.

== Background ==
Joseph Hale Abbot was born on September 26, 1802 in Wilton, New Hampshire. He graduated from Bowdoin College in 1822, was tutor there in 1825-1827, and from 1827 to 1833 was a professor of mathematics and teacher of modern languages at Phillips Exeter Academy. He then taught at a school for young women in Boston, and subsequently became principal of the high school in Beverly, Massachusetts.

== Science writing ==
Abbott was a member, and for several years recording secretary, of the American Academy of Arts and Sciences, to whose Transactions he contributed numerous scientific papers. He paid much attention to the solving of pneumatic and hydraulic problems, and published ingenious and original speculations on these subjects.

In the "Ether Controversy" he was an advocate of the claims of Charles Thomas Jackson, that he discovered the anesthetic effects of ether. He also was associated with Joseph Emerson Worcester in the preparation of his English Dictionary, and furnished many of the scientific definitions.

== Death ==
Joseph Hale Abbot died on April 7, 1873 in Beverly, Massachusetts, where he was also buried.
