= List of addresses in Beacon Hill, Boston =

Coordinates: 42.3583°N 71.0661°W

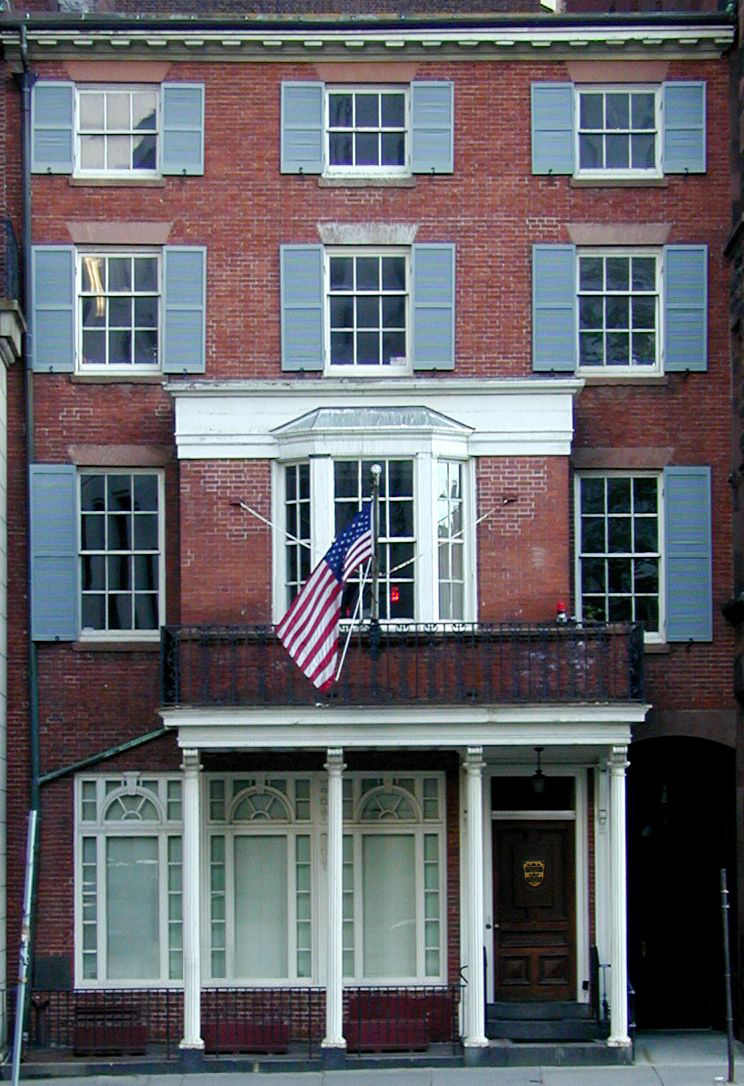
The Chester Harding House, a National Historic Landmark occupied by portrait painter Chester Harding from 1826–1830, now houses the Boston Bar Association.

The List of notable addresses in Beacon Hill, Boston contains information, by street, of significant buildings and the people who lived in the community. Many of the street names have changed. For instance, Phillips street was once called Southack Street.

== Current and former street names ==
Map of Beacon Hill from 1842

- Anderson Street – West Centre Street
- Bowdoin Street – Middlecott Street
- Bulfinch Street
- Court Street – Prison Lane, then Queen Street
- Howard – Southack's Court (after Capt. Cyprian Southack)
- Irving Street – Butolph Street
- Joy Street
  - Clapboard Street (between Cambridge and Myrtle Streets in 1735)
  - Belknap Lane (between Myrtle and Mount Vernon Streets)
- Mt. Vernon Street – Sumner
- Phillips Street – Southack Street (after Capt. Cyprian Southack)
- Revere Street – May Street
- Smith Court – May's Court
- State Street – King Street
- Tremont – Common (NE of School Street where Beacon Street ends)
- West Cedar Street – George Street

== Notable addresses in Beacon Hill ==
=== Beacon Street ===
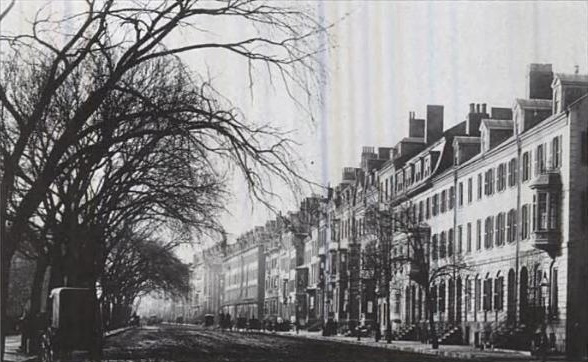
Beacon Street, 1887

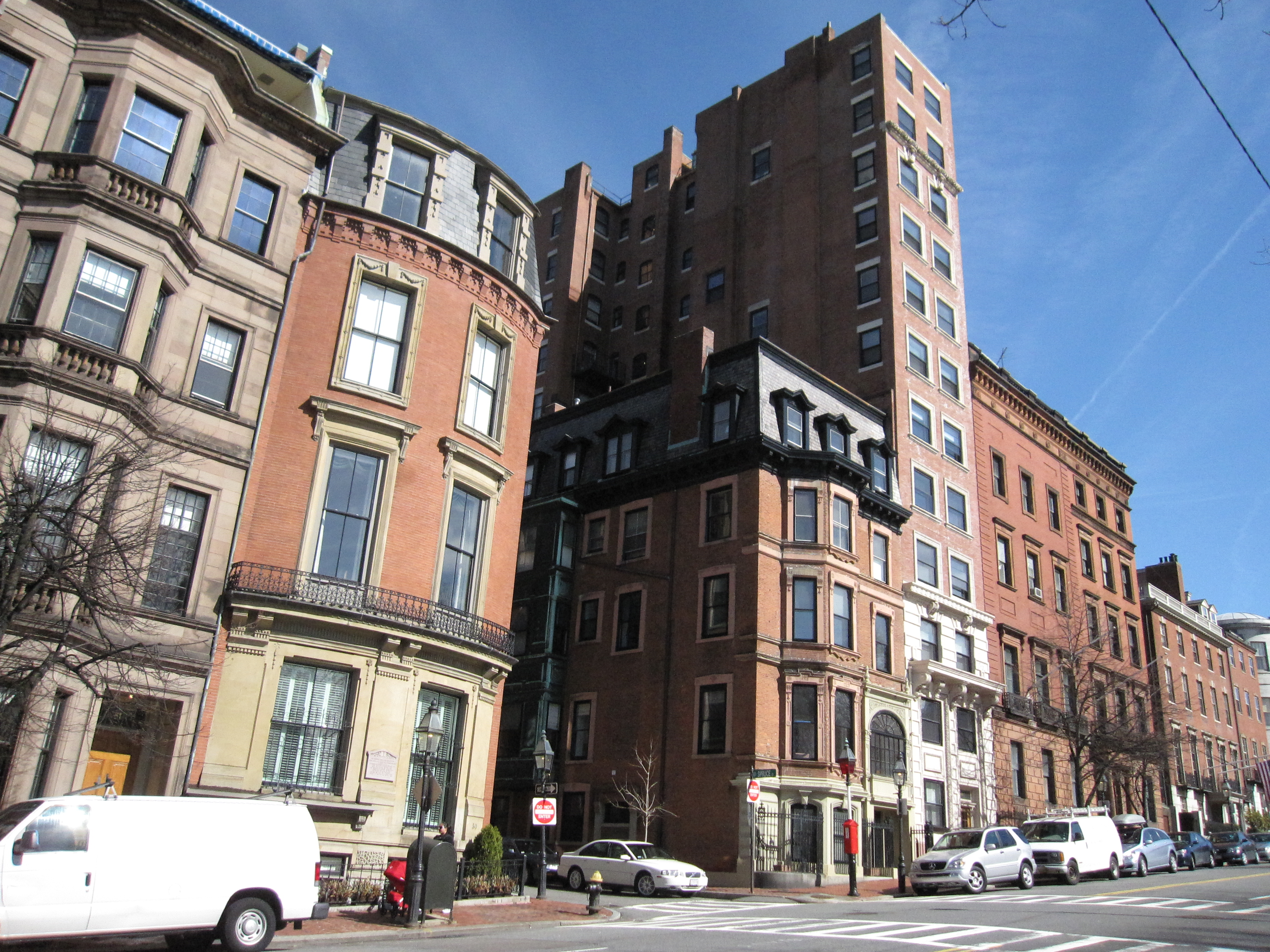
Beacon Street, 2010

Beacon Street is a main thoroughfare from the Tremont Street and School Street intersection to Charles Street. Hancock Manor was located at 30 Beacon Street; Its land is now part of the grounds of the Massachusetts State House.

- One Beacon Street – An eponymous office tower at the corner of Tremont Street; the 14th-tallest building in the city
- 8 Beacon Street – late 19th- and early 20th-century home of the Osgood Family: Dr. Osgood, Margaret Osgood and daughters Gretchen and Mary
- 10½ Beacon Street – Boston Athenæum
- 14 Beacon Street – Congregational House, site of the Congregational Library and City Mission Society
- 16 Beacon Street – Chester Harding House, now home to the Boston Bar Association, was home to the famous portrait painter Chester Harding from 1826–1830
- 22 Beacon Street – Amory-Ticknor House, built in 1804 by Charles Bulfinch; used to house the Beacon Hill studio for Fox 25 News (WFXT), with a strategic rooftop camera position
- 24 Beacon Street – Massachusetts State House
- 25 Beacon Street – former headquarters of the Unitarian Universalist Association, an international liberal religious denomination, which is now located at 24 Farnsworth Street
- 33 Beacon Street – resident George Parkman; building designed by Cornelius Coolidge
- 34½ Beacon Street – erstwhile headquarters of Family Service of Greater Boston, a private, nonprofit social service agency founded in 1835
- 39–40 Beacon Street – Henry Wadsworth Longfellow courted and married Fanny Appleton
- 42–43 Beacon Street – painter John Singleton Copley had a house on this site, as did David Sears II, whose house is now the home of the Somerset Club
- 45 Beacon Street – Third Harrison Gray Otis House, now American Meteorological Society
- 57 Beacon Street - Thomas J. Eckley house, Ephraim Marsh, architect (1819). Notable as town residence of George Nixon Black, Jr., also owner of Kragsyde, iconic Shingle Style cottage and Woodlawn Museum, his Asher Benjamin ancestral home in Maine. Black was a major benefactor of the Museum of Fine Arts, Boston.
- 54–55 Beacon Street – resident William H. Prescott had William Makepeace Thackeray as a houseguest. The pair of buildings is now the Headquarters House
- 84 Beacon Street – Cheers Beacon Hill. Formerly known as the Bull & Finch Pub, this pub was the inspiration for the classic television show, Cheers, and was shown during the opening credits of the sitcom.

=== Bowdoin Street ===
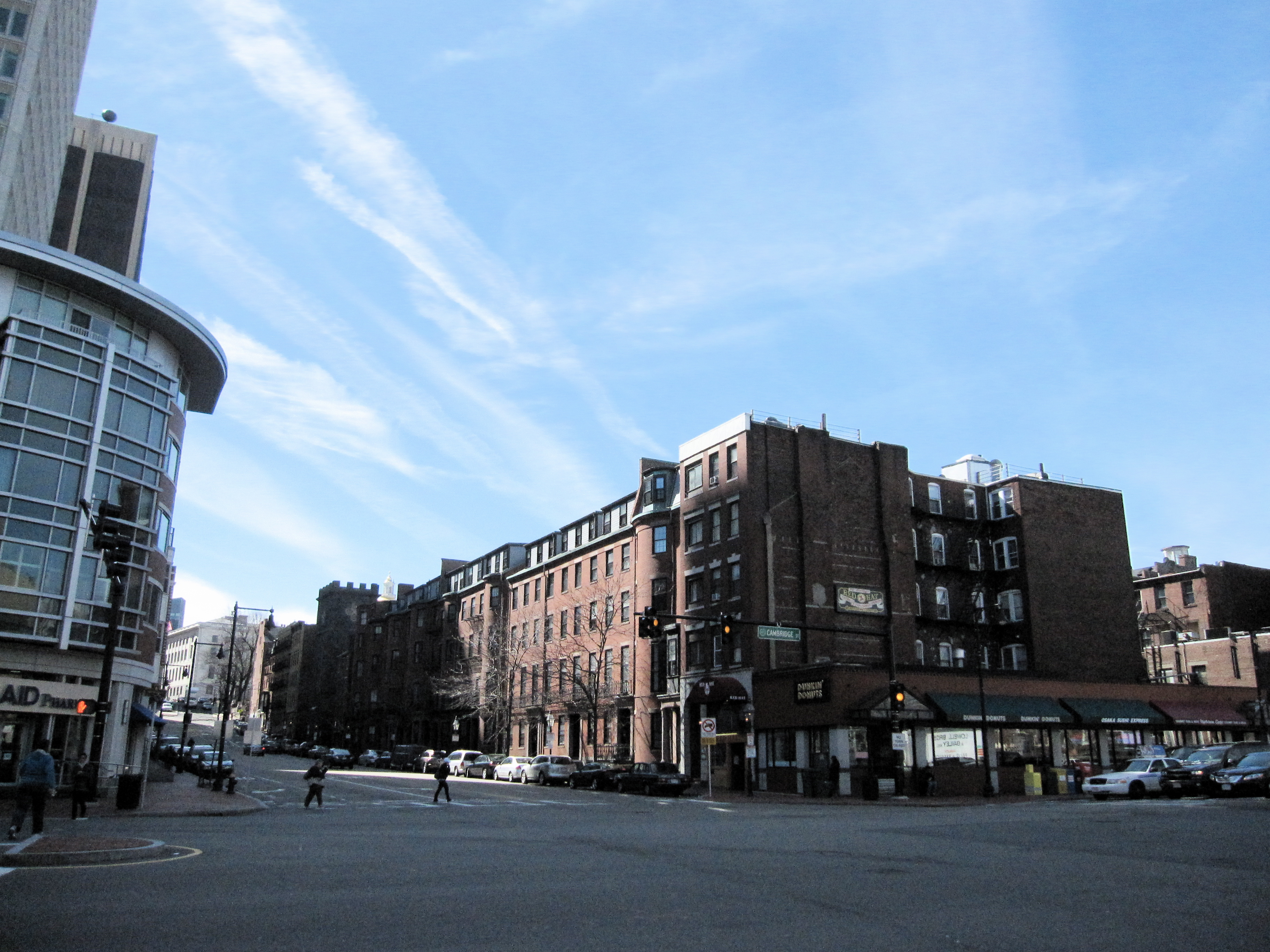
Bowdoin Street, 2010

Located near the West End, Bowdoin Street extends from the top of Beacon Street, down Beacon Hill to Cambridge Street

- 35 Bowdoin Street – Church of Saint John the Evangelist
- 122 Bowdoin Street – nominal resident, John Fitzgerald Kennedy (registered voting address)

=== Brimmer Street ===
- 30 Brimmer Street – Church of the Advent (official site)
- 44 Brimmer Street – resident Samuel Eliot Morison

=== Cambridge Street ===
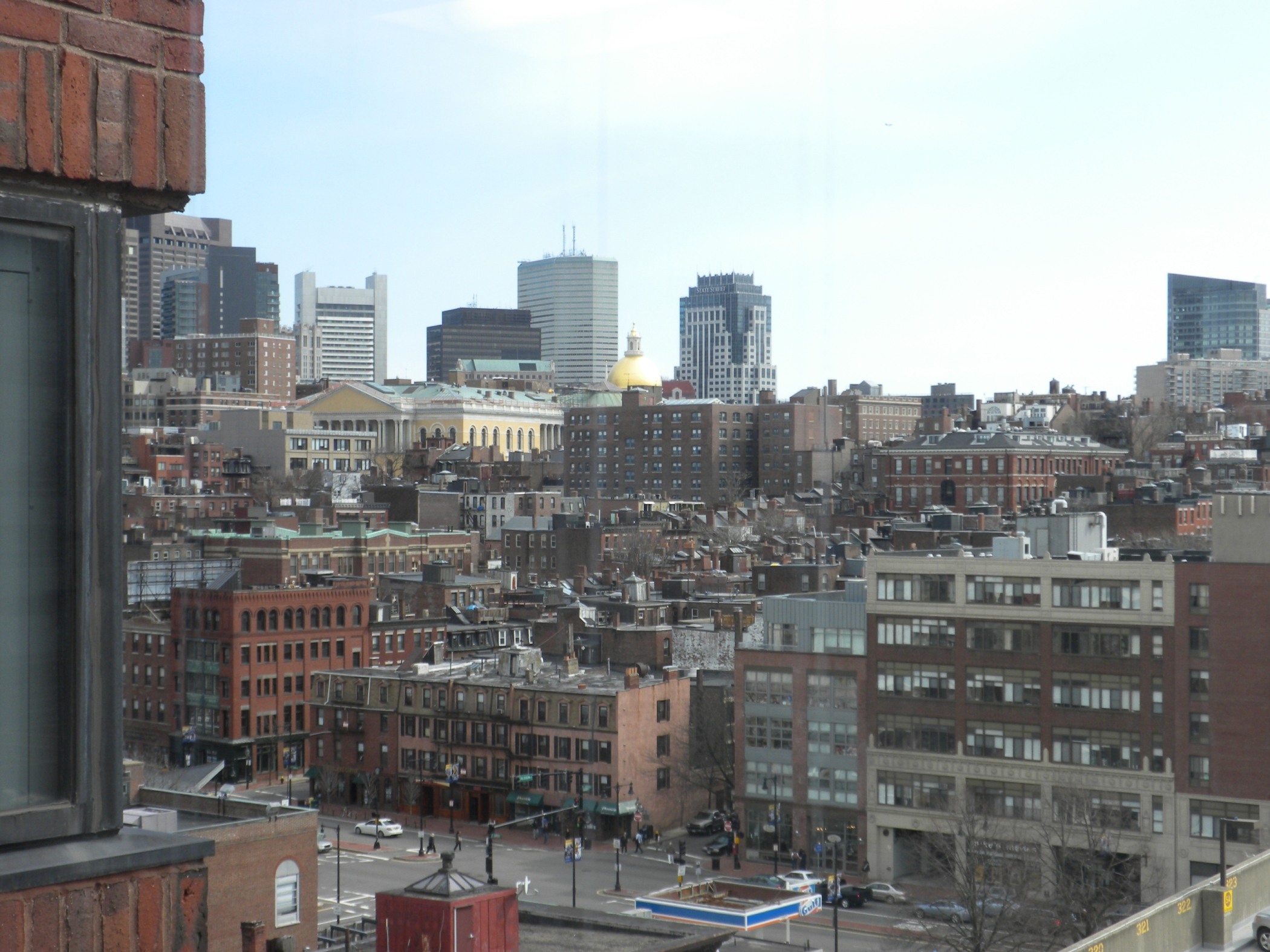
View of downtown from Massachusetts General Hospital, Cambridge Street, Beacon Hill

- Massachusetts General Hospital – Bulfinch Pavilion and Ether Dome
- 100 Cambridge Street, Upper Plaza – Garden of Peace
- 131 Cambridge Street – Old West Church
- 141 Cambridge Street – First Harrison Gray Otis House, architect Charles Bulfinch

=== Charles Street ===
Running north to south, Charles Street runs through the middle of Boston.

- 44A Charles Street – Mary Sullivan, last victim of the Boston Strangler, murdered here
- 70 Charles Street – Charles Street Meeting House

=== Chestnut Street ===
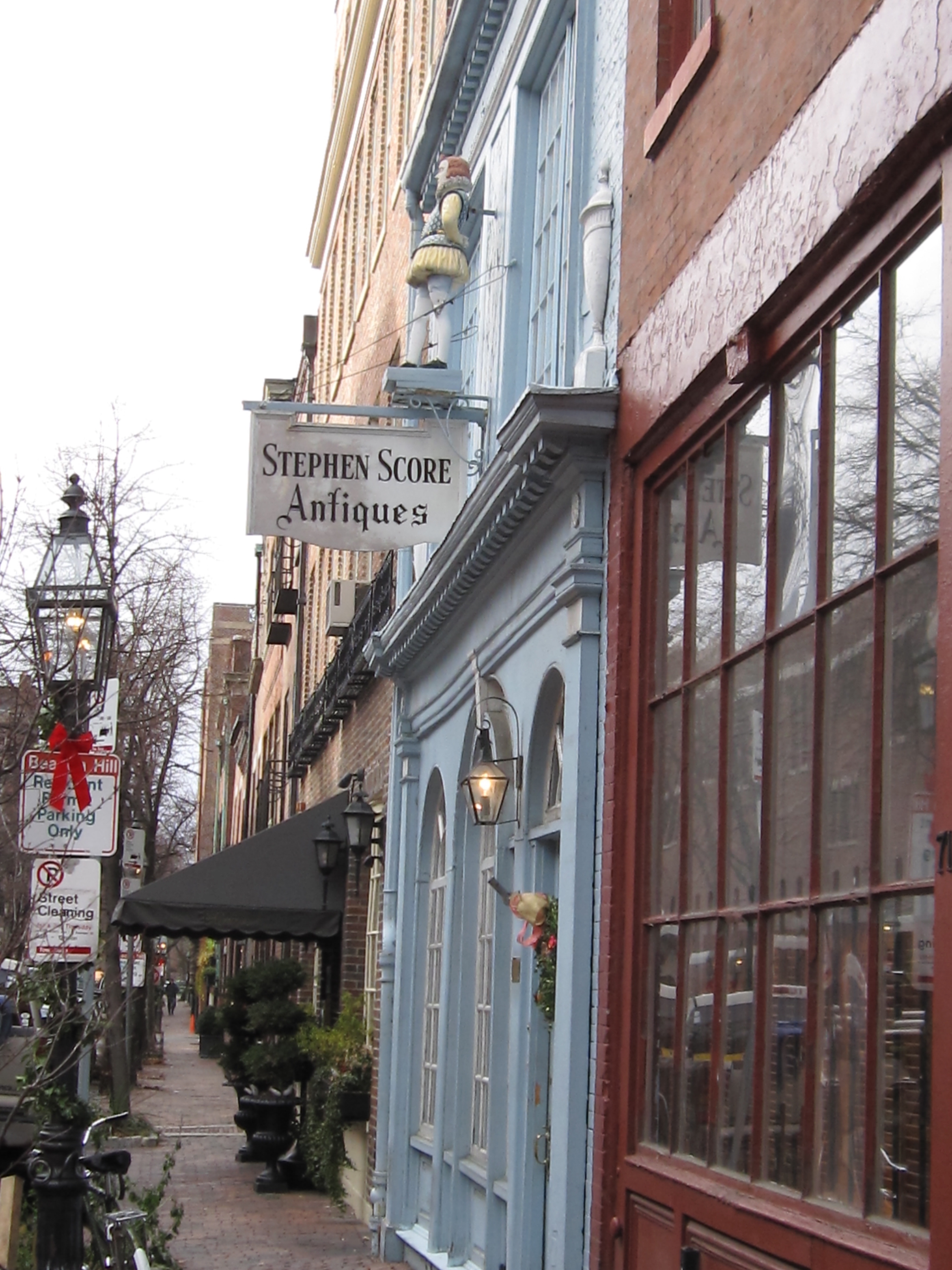
Chestnut Street

- 2 Chestnut Street – held the Garland Junior College from 1872 to 1976
- 6 Chestnut Street – Beacon Hill Friends House
- 13, 15, 17 Chestnut Street – architect Charles Bulfinch designed row-houses for Hepzibah Swan
- 18 Chestnut Street – birthplace of poet Robert Lowell
- 50 Chestnut Street – resident Francis Parkman, historian; building designed by Cornelius Coolidge
- 57A Chestnut Street – Harvard Musical Association

=== Grove Street ===
- 28 Grove Street – resident Rev. Leonard A. Grimes, prominent black clergyman associated with the Underground Railroad and abolitionist movement. Noted for being one of the men who bought the freedom of Anthony Burns after his arrest.

=== Irving Street ===
- 58 Irving Street – birthplace of Charles Sumner, abolitionist, U.S. Senator.

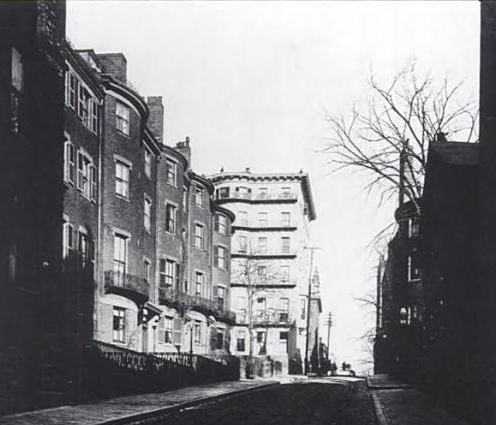
Joy Street, c. 19th century

=== Joy Street ===
- 46 Joy Street – African Meeting House
- 60 Joy Street – Peter Faneuil School
- 67 Joy Street – resident Rebecca Lee Crumpler, prominent physician, considered to be the first black woman to receive a medical degree in the U.S.

=== Louisburg Square ===
Named for the Siege of Louisbourg, the square is a private park and the name of the area around it.

- 4 Louisburg Square – resident William Dean Howells while editor of the Atlantic Monthly
- 10 Louisburg Square – residents Amos Bronson Alcott and Louisa May Alcott and family
- 19 Louisburg Square – residents John Kerry and Teresa Heinz Kerry
- 20 Louisburg Square – singer Jenny Lind married Otto Goldschmidt here

=== Mount Vernon Street ===
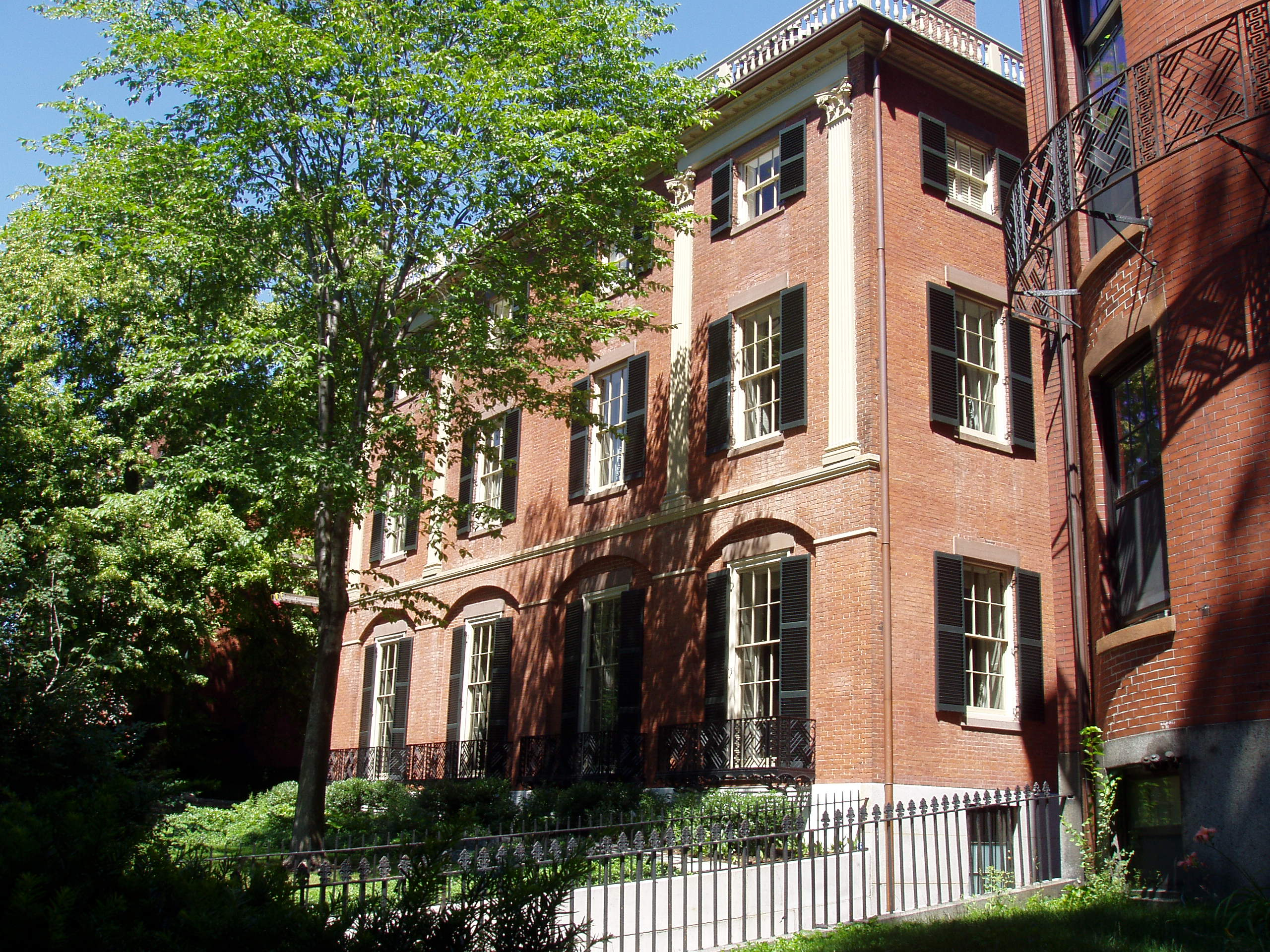
Second Harrison Gray Otis House, 85 Mount Vernon Street

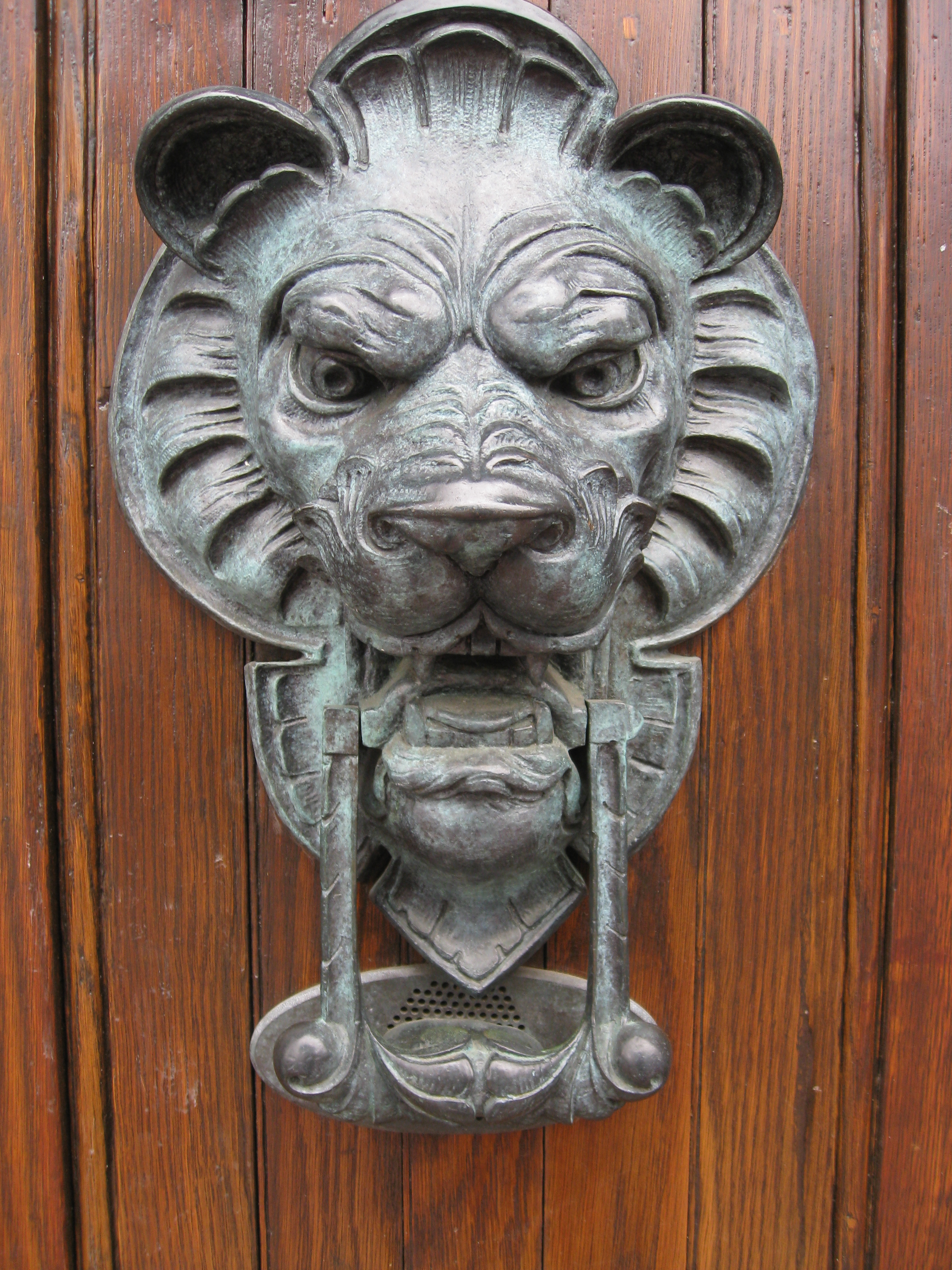
A door knocker in Beacon Hill, Boston

- 5 Mount Vernon Street – former site of Dr. Park's "Boston Lyceum for the Education of Young Ladies"
- 8 Mount Vernon Street – home of Fiske Warren and Gretchen Osgood Warren
- 32 Mount Vernon Street – residents Dr. Samuel Gridley Howe and his wife Julia Ward Howe
- 41 Mount Vernon Street – home of Beacon Press, a department of the Unitarian Universalist Association, that published the Senator Mike Gravel edition of the Pentagon Papers in 1971, which is now located at 24 Farnsworth Street. Former home of the Watch and Ward Society
- 45–47 Mount Vernon Street – site of Portia School of Law, founded for women in 1908
- 51–57 Mount Vernon Street – architect Charles Bulfinch
- 55 Mount Vernon Street – home of Rose Standish Nichols, now the Nichols House Museum
- 57 Mount Vernon Street – residents Daniel Webster and later Charles Francis Adams
- 67 Mount Vernon Street – home of Samuel Dennis and Susan Cornelia Warren, paper manufacturer and one time president of the Museum of Fine Arts, Boston
- 72 Mount Vernon Street – site of the Boston University School of Theology
- 76 Mount Vernon Street – home of Margaret Deland
- 77 Mount Vernon Street – resident Sarah Wyman Whitman and later the clubhouse of the Club of Odd Volumes
- 85 Mount Vernon Street – Second Harrison Gray Otis House, architect Charles Bulfinch
- 87 Mount Vernon Street – Colonial Society of Massachusetts, architect Charles Bulfinch
- 127 Mount Vernon Street – home of The Real World: Boston and Spenser: For Hire, former Boston Fire Department station

=== Myrtle Street ===
- 109 Myrtle Street – resident Lysander Spooner, an American individualist anarchist.

=== Park Street ===
Park Street is a small but notable road.

- 8 Park Street – Union Club of Boston
- Park Street District

=== Phillips Street ===
Formerly known as Southack Court, after the owner Cyprian Southack

- 2 Phillips Street – Resident John Coburn
- 18 Phillips Street – The Vilna Shul, now Boston's Center For Jewish Culture
- 41 Phillips Street – Erstwhile site of the Northeast Institute of Industrial Technology
- 66 Phillips Street – Lewis and Harriet Hayden House, associated with the Abolitionist movement and the Underground Railroad
- 83 Phillips Street – Resident John Sweat Rock, prominent black dentist, attorney, and abolitionist activist

=== Pinckney Street ===
- 15 Pinckney Street – a site of Elizabeth Peabody's Kindergarten
- 86 Pinckney Street – home of abolitionist, and state legislator John J. Smith
- 105 Pinckney Street – Resident P.P.F. Degrand

=== Smith Court ===
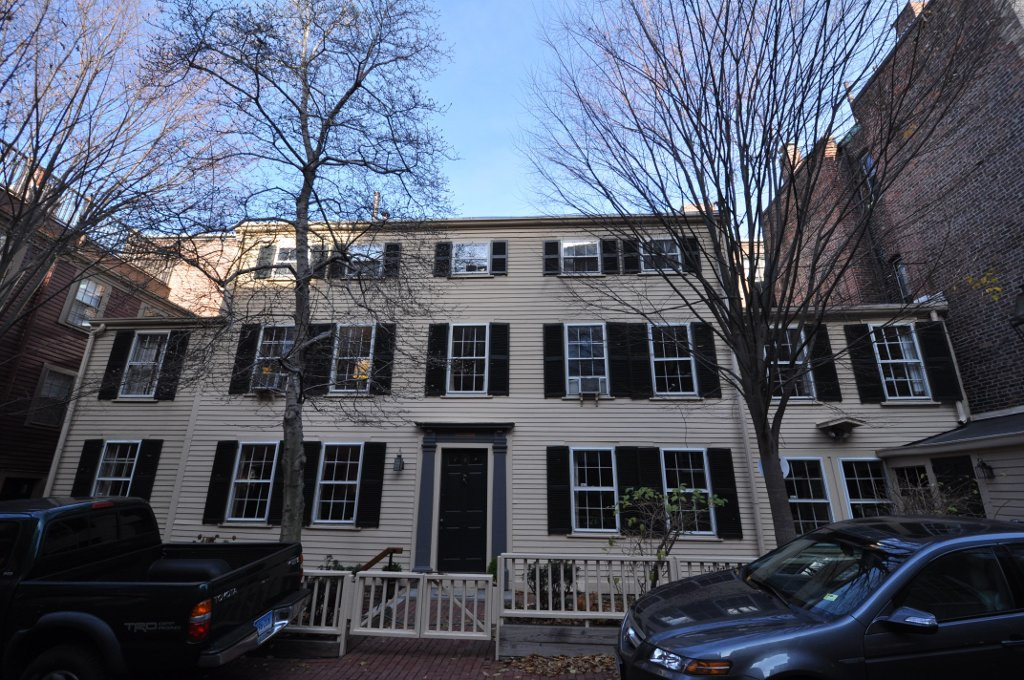
William C. Nell House

- 3 Smith Court – residence of William Cooper Nell, African American abolitionist, author and historian

=== Tremont Street ===
Tremont Street is a main thoroughfare; Its name evolved from trimount including Beacon Hill, Mount Vernon and Pemberton Hill. Beacon Theatre was once located at 47–53 Tremont Street.

=== Other residents ===
- Writers Brad Meltzer and Judd Winick lived in a tiny apartment in Beacon Hill in 1993 before they achieved success. While living there, Winick developed his first successful comic strip and Meltzer worked at Games Magazine by day while working on his first novel at night.
