= List of tourist attractions in Boston =

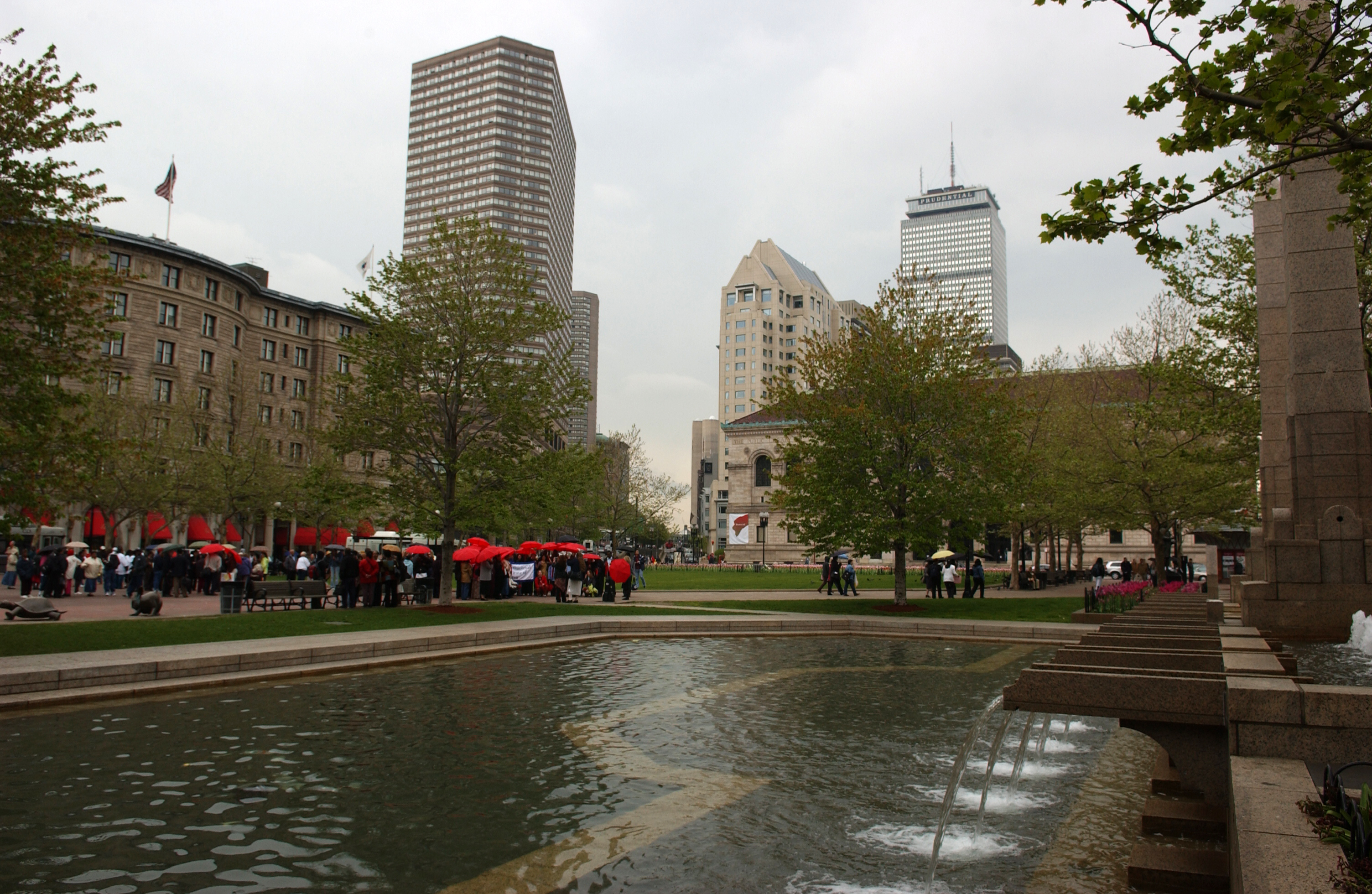
Copley Square

The following is a list of tourist attractions in Boston, Massachusetts. Some sites appear in multiple lists.

== Historic sites and national parks ==
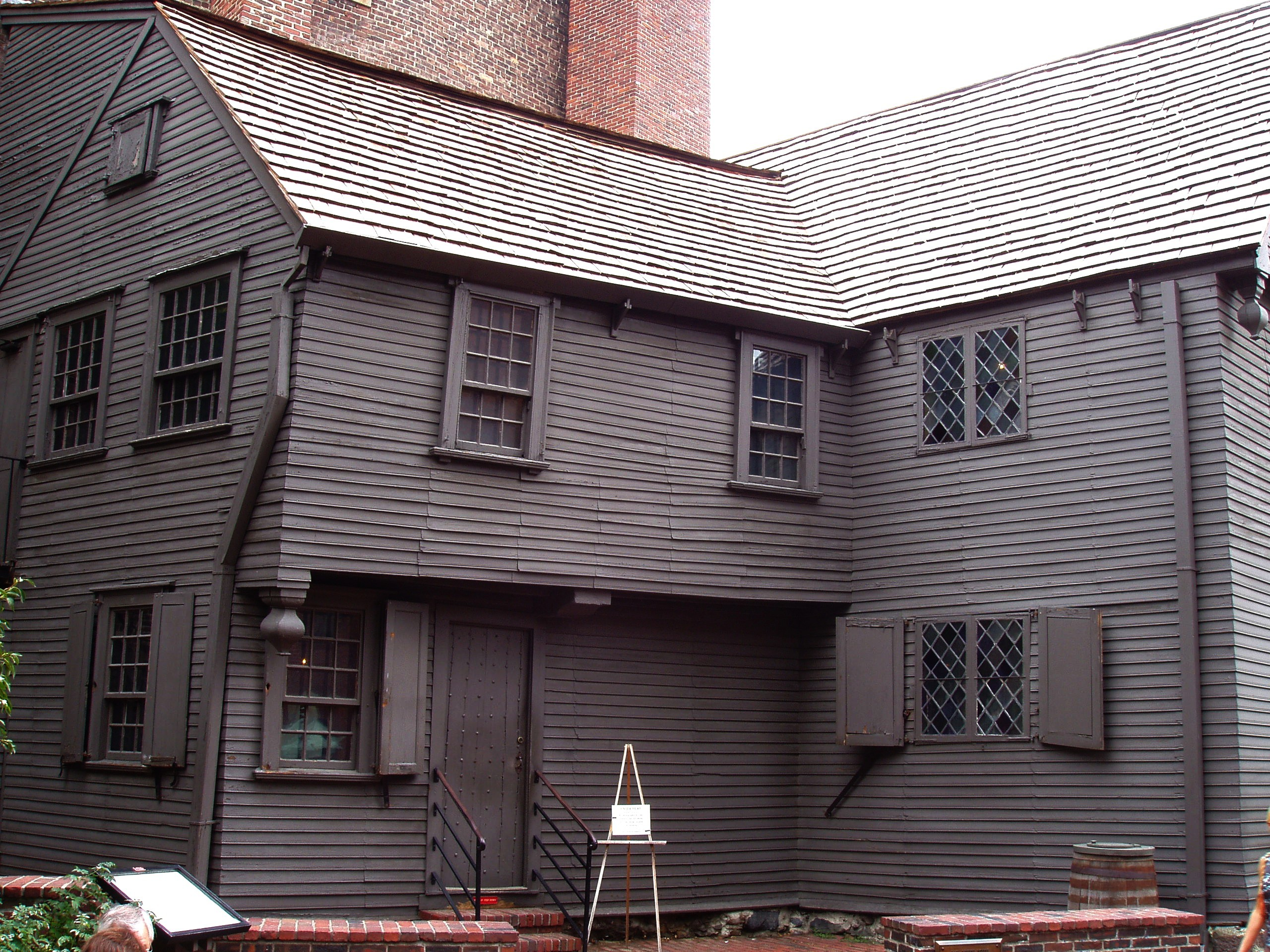
Paul Revere House

- Black Heritage Trail
- Boston Harbor Islands National Recreation Area
- Boston National Historical Park
- Castle Island
- Custom House Tower
- Dorchester Heights Monument
- Freedom Trail – marked by a red line of bricks embedded in the ground
  - Boston Common (including Boston Public Garden)
  - Bunker Hill Monument
  - Faneuil Hall (Quincy Market is adjacent)
  - Granary Burying Ground
  - Massachusetts State House
  - Old North Church
  - Old State House
  - Paul Revere House
  - USS Constitution
- Old City Hall

== Museums, aquariums, and zoos ==
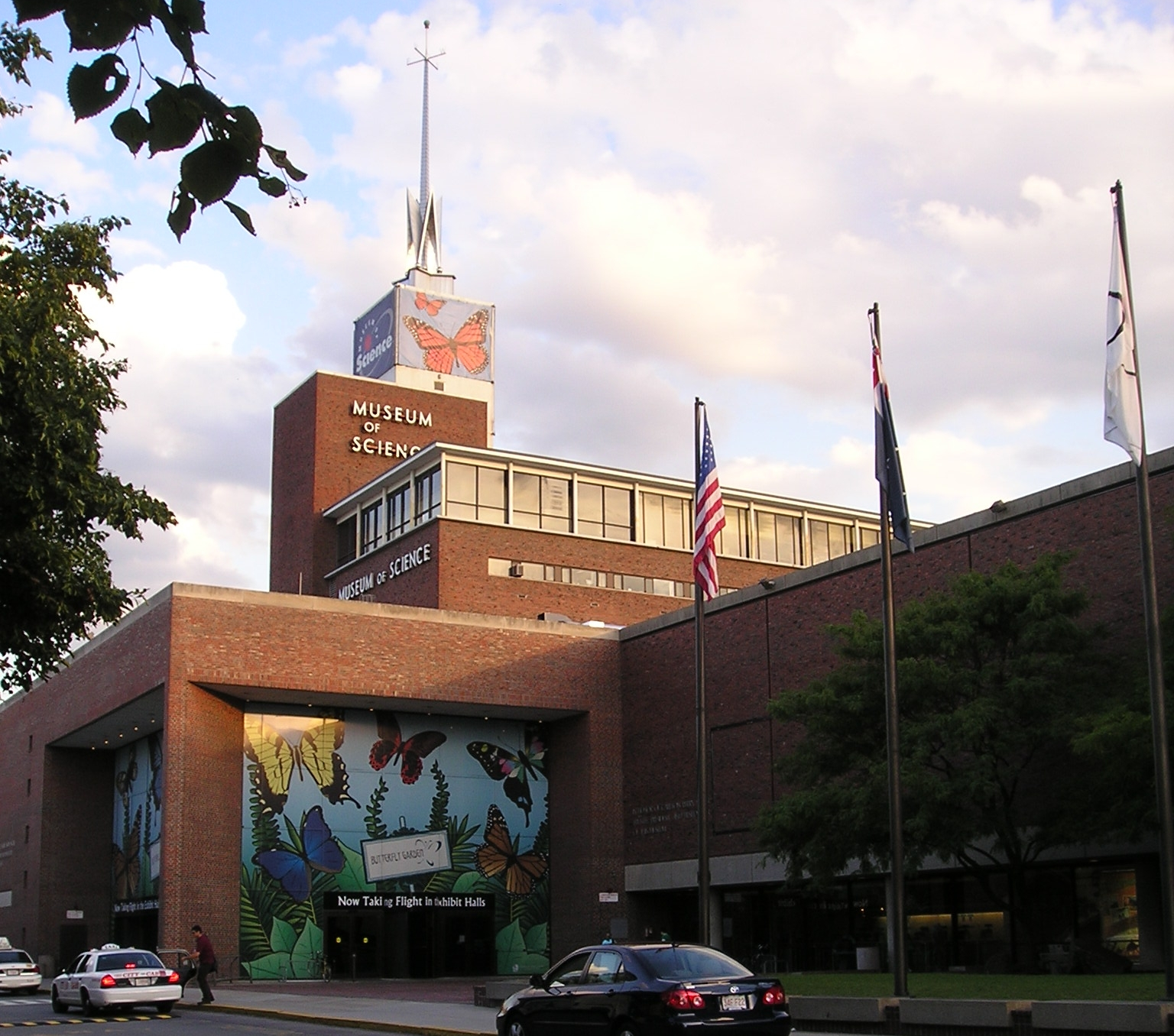
Boston's Museum of Science

- Boston Athenæum – one of the oldest independent libraries in the United States
- Boston Children's Museum
- Boston Tea Party Ships and Museum – on the Fort Point Channel, includes a full-scale replica of the Eleanor and Beaver, two of the ships involved in the event
- Edward M. Kennedy Institute for the United States Senate – specialty museum with a full-scale reproduction of the U.S. Senate Chamber
- Franklin Park Zoo
- Gibson House Museum
- Harrison Gray Otis House
- Institute of Contemporary Art
- Isabella Stewart Gardner Museum – art museum focusing on European art
- John F. Kennedy Presidential Library and Museum – presidential library
- The Mary Baker Eddy Library and Mapparium – cultural and historical museum/library
- Museum of Fine Arts – art museum
- Museum of Science – science museum, including an IMAX theater and planetarium
- New England Aquarium
- Nichols House Museum
- Old South Meeting House
- Old State House
- Prescott House
- USS Cassin Young – decorated Fletcher-class destroyer from World War II
- USS Constitution Museum – a hands-on museum that collects, preserves, and interprets the history of Old Ironsides
- Warren Anatomical Museum

== Parks and squares ==
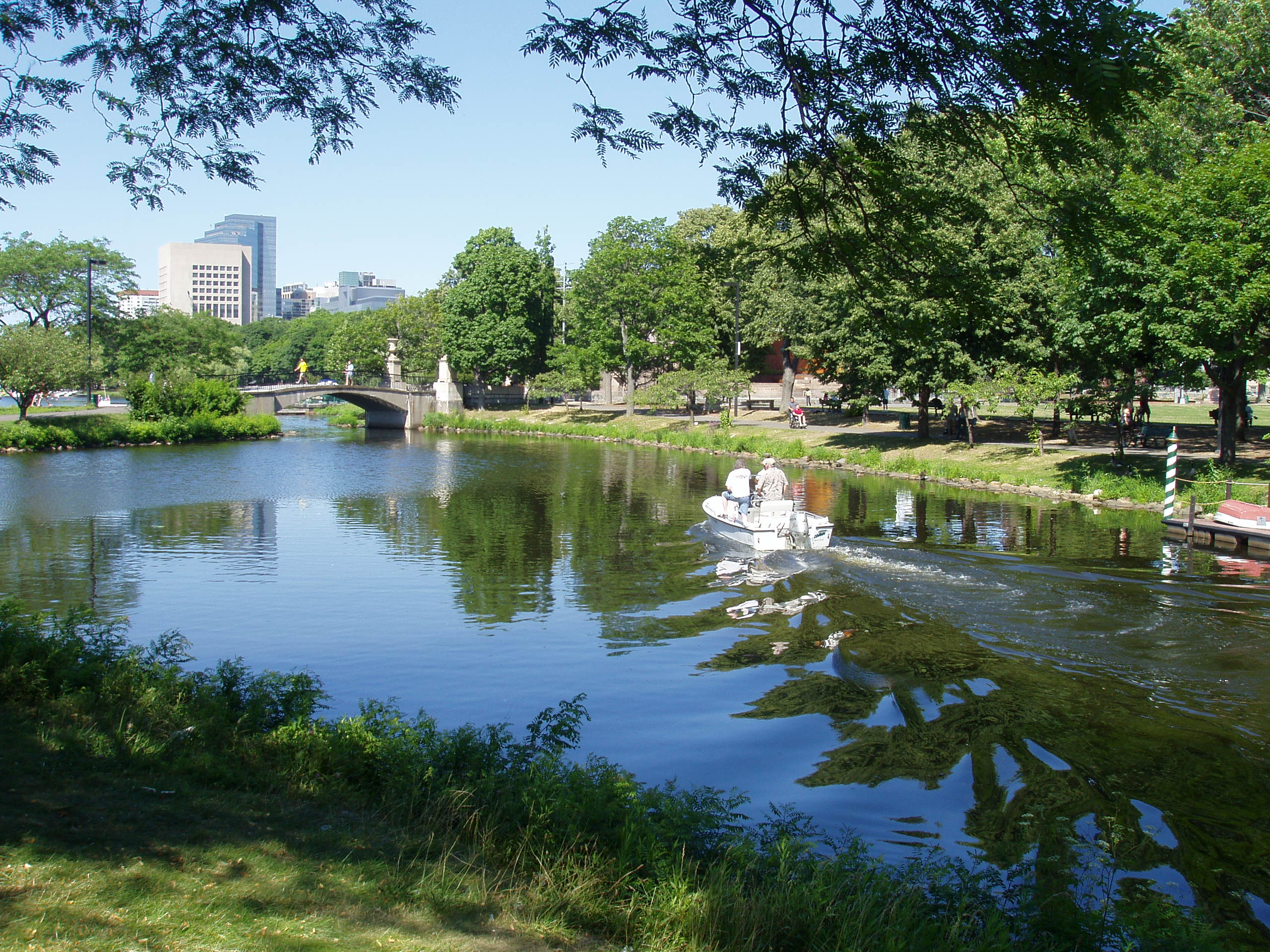
Charles River Esplanade

- Arnold Arboretum
- Boston Common
- Boston Public Garden
- Charles River and Esplanade
- Copley Square
- Kenmore Square
- Garden of Peace
- Rose Kennedy Greenway

== Performing arts centers ==
- Boston Opera House
- Citi Performing Arts Center
- Cutler Majestic Theatre
- Jordan Hall at the New England Conservatory of Music
- Symphony Hall – home of the Boston Symphony Orchestra and Boston Pops Orchestra

== Religious buildings ==
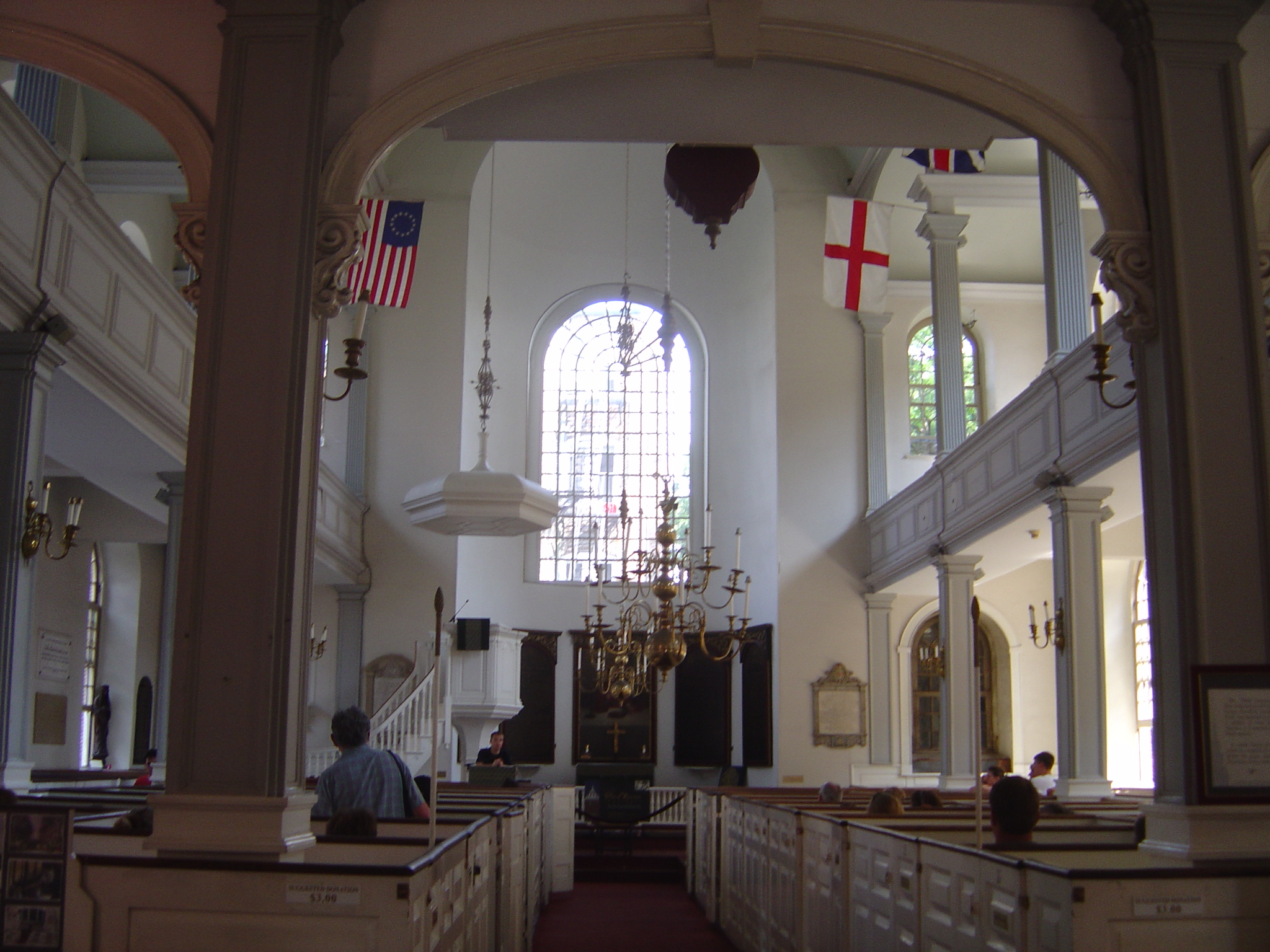
Old North Church

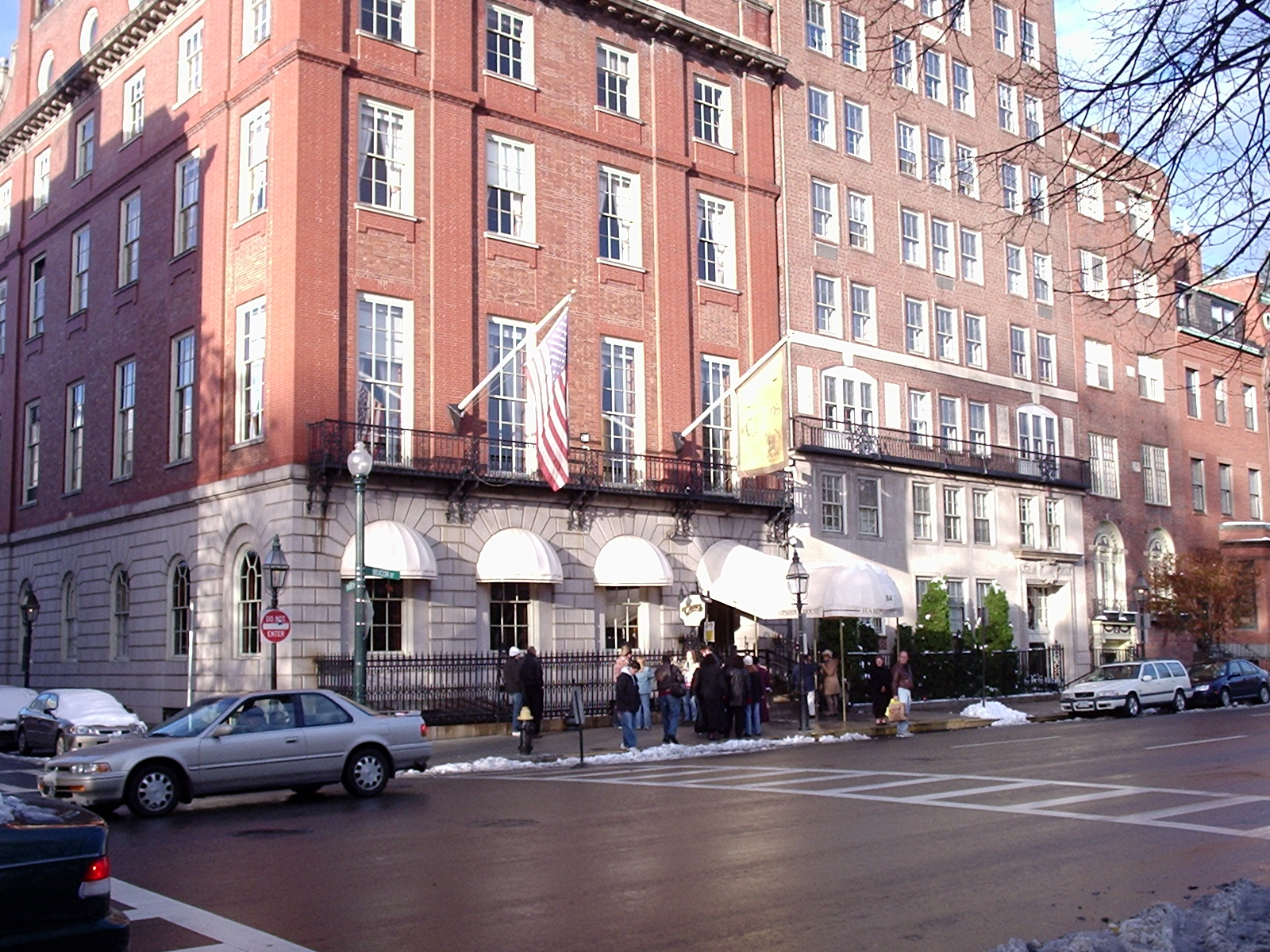
"Cheers" on Beacon Hill

- Cathedral Church of St. Paul - Episcopal church
- Cathedral of the Holy Cross - Roman Catholic church
- Old North Church - Episcopal church
- Old South Church - United Church of Christ church
- The First Church of Christ, Scientist - Christian Science
- Trinity Church, Back Bay, an Episcopal church
- First Church in Boston, Back Bay, Unitarian Universalist church designed by Paul Rudolph

== Restaurants and pubs ==
- Bull & Finch Pub – whose building is known from the television show Cheers
- Legal Sea Foods – well known seafood restaurant with 11 locations in Boston
- Union Oyster House – oldest restaurant in the United States

== Shopping areas ==
- Copley Place
- Downtown Crossing
- Newbury Street
- Prudential Center
- Quincy Market – part of the larger Faneuil Hall Marketplace

== Sports arenas and stadiums ==
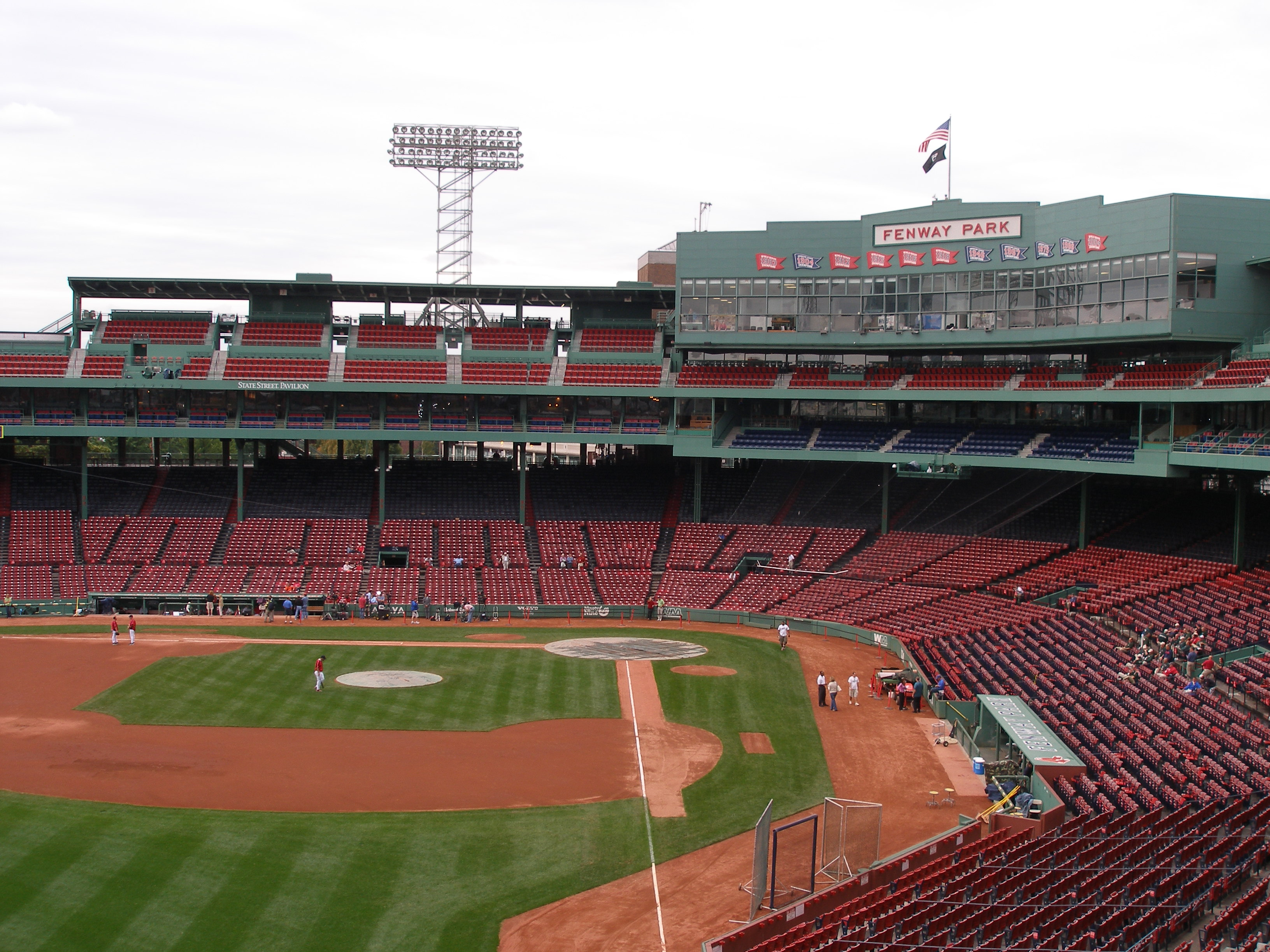
Fenway Park

- Agganis Arena at Boston University
- Fenway Park – home of the Boston Red Sox
- Harvard Stadium
- Suffolk Downs
- Nickerson Field
- TD Garden – home of the Boston Bruins and the Boston Celtics, formerly named the FleetCenter, this arena replaced the Boston Garden in 1995

== Tours ==
- Boston By Foot – offers guided architectural and historical walking tours of various Boston neighborhoods, including Beacon Hill, Back Bay, the North End, and the Freedom Trail
- Boston Duck Tours – guided-tour that uses World War II-era duck boats
- Boston HarborWalk – tour designed to allow people to walk the entire shore of Boston Harbor
- Harpoon Brewery – free beer samples
- Samuel Adams Brewery – free guided tour of the brewery demonstrating each step of the beer making process and ending with samplings of different varieties

== Other ==
- Autumn foliage – in the outer suburbs of Boston, whose vibrant color attracts many tourists
