= The Tortoise and the Hare (disambiguation) =

The Tortoise and the Hare is one of Aesop's Fables.

The Tortoise and the Hare may also refer to:

== Literature ==
- The Tortoise and the Hare (novel) (1954), a novel by English author Elizabeth Jenkins
- Sugungga, a pansori based on the story of The Rabbit and the Tortoise, a Korean folk tale different from Aesop's
- The Tortoise & the Hare (book) (2013), a picture book illustrated by Jerry Pinkney

== Screen ==
- The Tortoise and the Hare (1935), a short animated Disney film
- Tortoise Beats Hare (1941), an animated short Merrie Melodies film starring Bugs Bunny
- Tortoise Wins by a Hare (1943), a Merrie Melodies sequel to Tortoise Beats Hare
- The Story of The Tortoise & the Hare (2002), directed by Ray Harryhausen
- Testudo et Lepus (The Tortoise and the Hare) (2007), an episode of the television series Rome
- The Tortoise and the Hare-Brain (2007), an episode of the animated television series Brandy & Mr. Whiskers
- Tortoise vs. Hare (2008), an animated film from The Jim Henson Company
- Kachua Aur Khargosh (2008), or Tortoise and Hare, winner of the Indian National Film Award for Best Non-Feature Animation Film

== Other uses ==
- "Tortoise and the Hare" (song), a song on the Moody Blues 1970 album A Question of Balance
- Hare and Tortoise, a popular board game based on Aesop's fable
- The Tortoise and the Hare algorithm, in computer science, another name for Floyd's algorithm for finding a cycle in a sequence of iterated functions
- The Tortoise and the Hare (sculpture), 1994 sculpture in Boston

== See also ==
- Achilles and the Tortoise, one of Zeno's paradoxes, Achilles could be replaced by a hare with no change in Zeno's reasoning
