= Louisa Jane Hall =

American poet, essayist, literary critic

- Born: Louisa Jane Park; February 7, 1802; Newburyport, Massachusetts, U.S.
- Died: September 8, 1892 (aged 90); Cambridge, Massachusetts, U.S.
- Education: Boston Lyceum for Young Ladies
- Occupations: Poet, essayist, literary critic
- Spouse: Edward B. Hall (m. 1840; died 1866)
- Writing career
- Period: Romantic era

Louisa Jane Hall (née Park; February 7, 1802 – September 8, 1892) was an American poet, essayist, and literary critic of the Romantic era. None of her poems appeared in print until after she was twenty; they were then published anonymously in the Literary Gazette, and other periodicals. Miriam, a Dramatic Sketch, her most notable work, was begun in the summer of 1826, finished the following summer, and published ten years later. Her other principal work is in prose, Joanna of Naples, an Historical Tale, published in 1838. Hannah, the Mother of Samuel the Prophet and Judge of Israel (1839) was, like Miriam, a verse play. She and her father moved to Worcester, Massachusetts, in 1831, and they lived together until October 1840, when she married the Rev. E. B. Hall, of Providence, Rhode Island.

== Early years and education ==
Louisa Jane Park was born in Newburyport, Massachusetts, on February 7, 1802. Her parents were Dr. John Park and Louisa (Adams) Park. The father was a physician who had given up his medical practice when she was two, to move to Boston for the purpose of editing the New-England Repertory, a leading political journal of the Federal party.

In a few years, he became weary of the conflict, then waged with so much violence, and, urged to do so by some of the most intelligent citizens, opened the Boston Lyceum for Young Ladies, in which a more thorough education might be received than was common in that period. His daughter was then in her tenth year. He had already made her familiar with Milton and Shakespeare; and it was partly with the view of executing his plans for her education that he decided to become a public teacher. His school was opened in the spring of 1811, and for twenty years was eminently successful. His daughter, except when her studies were interrupted by ill health (in her early years, she showed symptoms of a delicate constitution), was eight years his pupil. She was an industrious scholar, and the thoroughness of her study shows itself all through her works by her chaste and correct style. She continued in her father's school until she was seventeen.

== Career ==
Her writings show that her mind was wisely as well as carefully disciplined, and probably her habits of composition were formed at an early period. She published nothing, however, until she was twenty years of age, and then anonymously, in the Literary Gazette, and other papers and magazines.

In 1831, her father retired to Worcester, Massachusetts, carrying with him a library of some 3,000 volumes, containing many valuable works in Latin, French, and Italian. During her partial blindness, he read to her several hours every day, and assisted her in collecting the materials for her tale of Joanna of Naples, an Historical Tale (1838), and for a biographical notice of the English author Elizabeth Carter.

Samuel Austin Allibone said that few American poetical compositions were more highly commended than "Miriam", Hall's finest work, which was written in 1826. She wrote it only for amusement, as she did many little poems and tales which she destroyed. The first half of this drama was read at a small literary party in Boston. The author, not being known, was present, and was encouraged by the remarks it occasioned to finish it in the following summer. Her father forbade her suggestion to burn it; it was read, as completed, in the winter of 1826, and the authorship disclosed, but she did not publish it for several years. She saw its defects more distinctly than before, when it appeared in print, and resolved never again to attempt anything so long in the form of poetry. Her eyesight failed for four or five years, during which time she was almost entirely deprived of the use of books, writing, and needlework. "Miriam" was published in 1837. It received the best approval of contemporary criticism, and a second edition, appeared in the following year. Hall had not proposed to herself to write a tragedy, but a dramatic poem, and the result was an instance of a successful accomplishment.

On October 1, 1840, she married Rev. Edward B. Hall, a Unitarian minister of Providence, Rhode Island, where she was occupied with domestic affairs, and in the duties which grew out of her relation to her husband's society, to bestow much further attention upon literature. A volume of Hall's writings, entitled Verse and Prose, was published in 1850. Rev. Hall died in 1866, and his widow continued to reside in Providence until 1872, when she moved to Boston, where she resided thereafter.

Hall lacked confidence in her own powers, and was always distrustful of the public reception of her articles. She would have written much more but for this reason, together with ill-health and impaired eye-sight.
