= Repertory (disambiguation) =

Repertory is the theatrical programming model. Repertory'also may refer to:

- Homeopathic repertory, aspect of the eponymous therapeutic system
- The "New-England Repertory", 19th-century Massachusetts newspaper
- Repertory (London), each of the respective series of historical records, of two "courts" governing that city
