= Statue of Phillips Brooks =

Statue in Boston, Massachusetts, U.S.

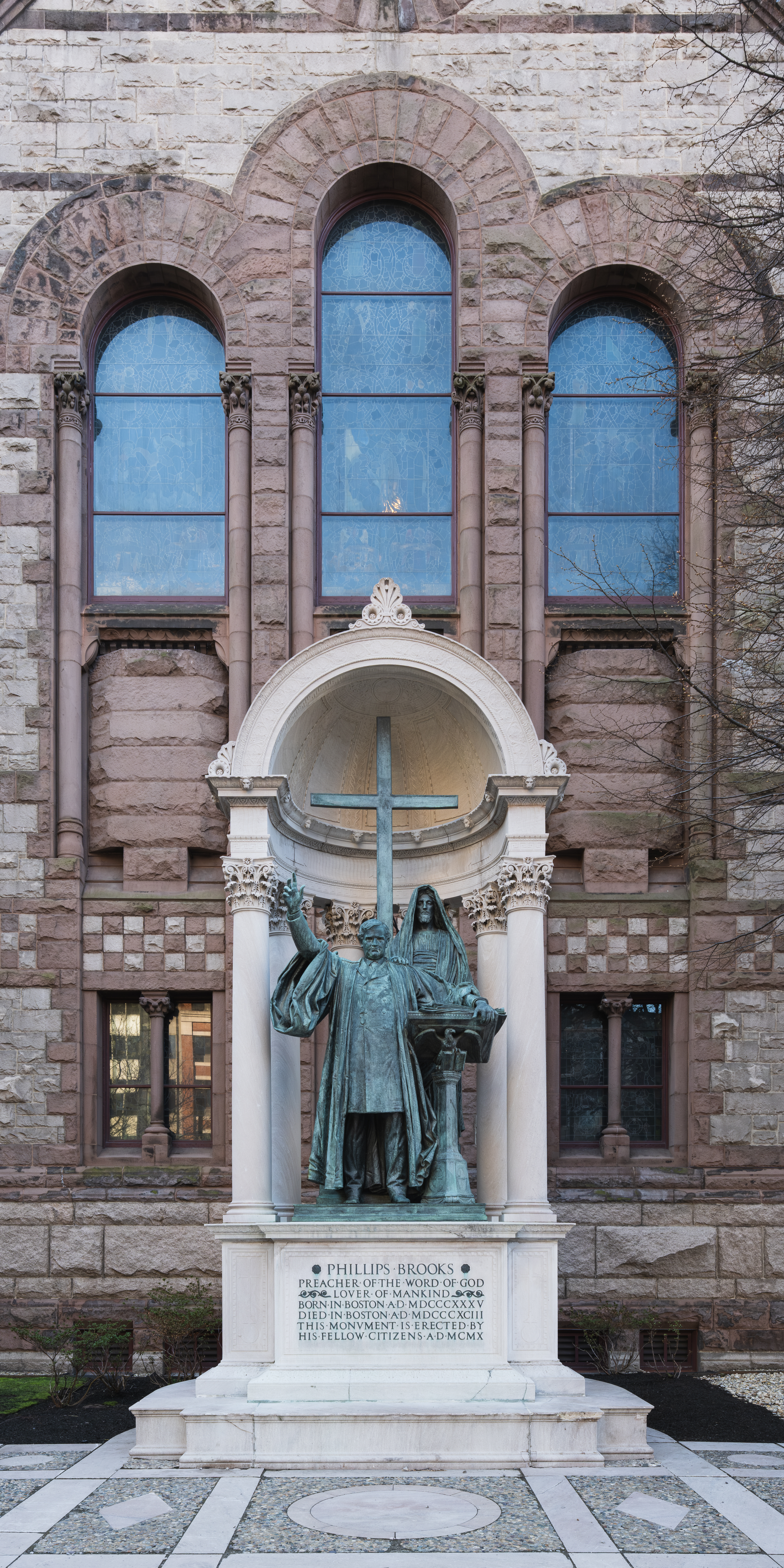
- The memorial in 2026
- Location: Boston, Massachusetts, U.S.; 42°21′0.7″N 71°4′32.1″W

A statue of Phillips Brooks is installed outside the Trinity Church in Boston's Copley Square, in the U.S. state of Massachusetts.

== Description and history ==
The memorial is credited to sculptors Augustus Saint-Gaudens, Frances Grimes, and architects Stanford White and Charles Follen McKim. It was commissioned in 1893 by the church congregation for $80,000 and completed from 1907–1910. The bronze statues of Brooks and Jesus stand in a domed marble niche that measures approximately 17 ft. x 14 ft. 1 in. x 38 in. The figures rest on a granite base that measures approximately 5 x 11 x 9 ft. An inscription on the front of the base reads in bronze lettering: "PHILLIPS BROOKS / PREACHER OF THE WORD OF GOD / LOVER OF MANKIND / BORN IN BOSTON AD MDCCCXXXV / DIED IN BOSTON AD MDCCCXCIII / THIS MONUMENT IS ERECTED BY / HIS FELLOW CITIZENS AD MCMX".
