= Statue of John Singleton Copley =

Statue in Boston, Massachusetts, U.S.

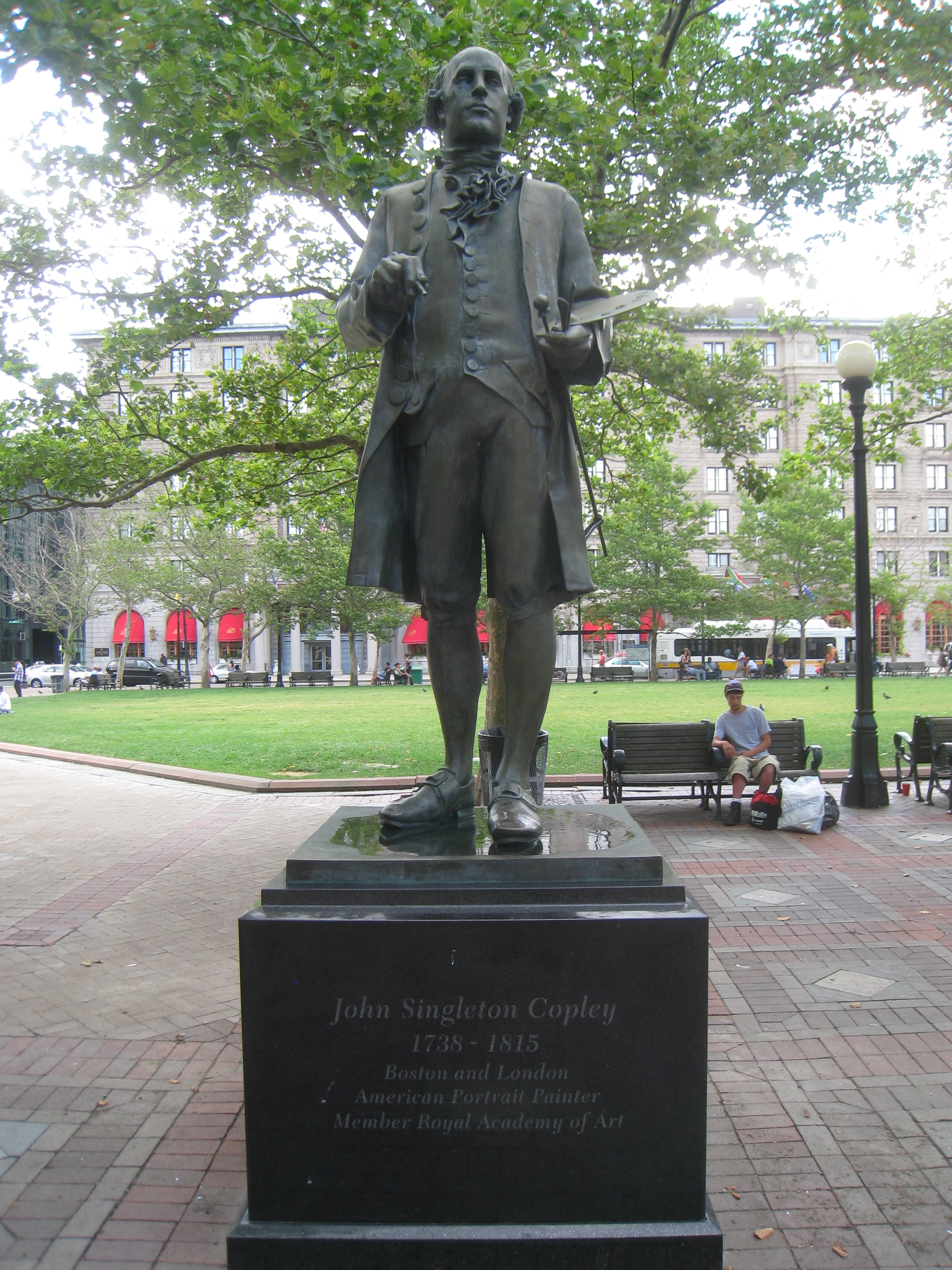
- The statue in 2010
- Artist: Lewis Cohen
- Subject: John Singleton Copley
- Location: Boston, Massachusetts, U.S.; 42°21′0.1″N 71°4′35.9″W

A statue of painter John Singleton Copley by Lewis Cohen is installed in Boston's Copley Square, in the U.S. state of Massachusetts. The bronze sculpture was installed in 2002.

A booklet published by the Friends of Copley Square describes the process of creating the statue.

== See also ==
- 2002 in art

== Sources ==
- Pokorny, Margaret, ed. (October 23, 2002). Copley Square: The Story of Boston's Art Square (PDF). Boston: Friends of Copley Square. Archived from the original (PDF) on May 28, 2013.
