= ArtsBoston =

American arts non-profit corporation

ArtsBoston is a not-for-profit corporation assisting the performing arts industry in Boston, Massachusetts. Since its founding in 1975, ArtsBoston has been one of the nation's performing arts non-profits, second only to New York City's Theatre Development Fund.

ArtsBoston provides discount tickets to performing arts events at its BosTix booths and through its BosTix Advance program.

== History ==
In 2011, ArtsBoston received a $70,000 grant by the Massachusetts Cultural Council Adams Arts Program.

In July 2022, ArtsBoston launched ArtsFinder, featuring short cultural histories of neighborhoods in New England, public art and links to museums, theaters, concert halls and other venues where music, dance, theater and other performances happen.

In July 2024, the ArtsBoston BosTix discount ticketing booth at Faneuil Hall reopened after closing during the COVID pandemic in 2020.

== BosTix ==
BosTix Booths are located in Faneuil Hall Marketplace and Copley Square, and sell half-price, day-of-show tickets. The booths also serve as a full-service Ticketmaster outlet, selling full-price tickets to events and local cultural attractions.
