= The Tortoise and the Hare (sculpture) =

Sculpture in Boston, Massachusetts, U.S.

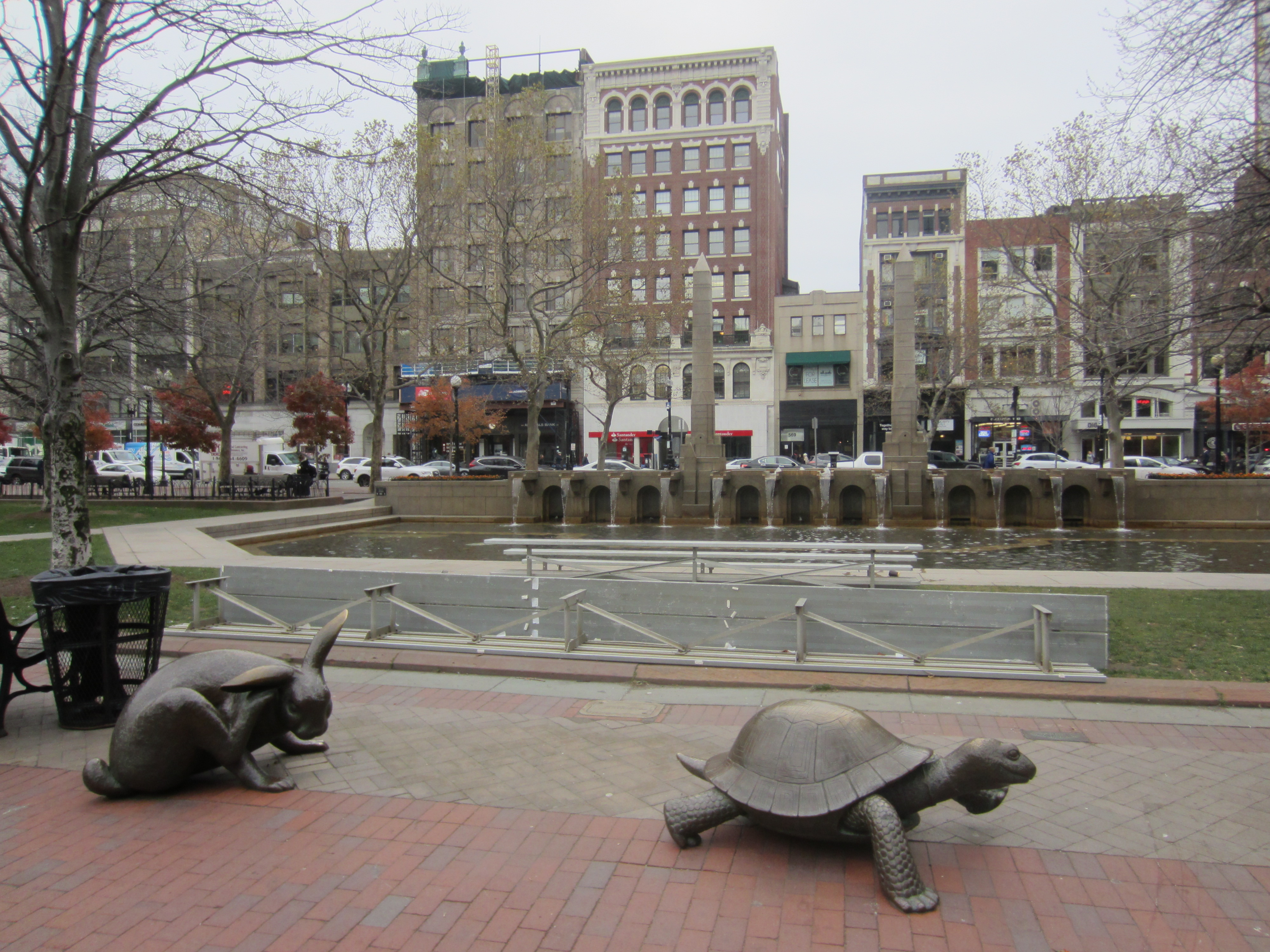
- The sculpture in 2019
- Artist: Nancy Schön
- Year: 1994
- Medium: Bronze sculpture
- Subject: The Tortoise and the Hare
- Location: Boston, Massachusetts, U.S.
- 42°20′59.9″N 71°4′34″W

The Tortoise and the Hare is a 1994 bronze sculpture by Nancy Schön, installed in Boston's Copley Square, in the U.S. state of Massachusetts. The work references one of Aesop's Fables, The Tortoise and the Hare, and commemorates Boston Marathon participants.

== See also ==
- 1994 in art
- Rabbits and hares in art
