= Copley Square =

Public park in Boston, Massachusetts

Coordinates: 42.350°N 71.076°W

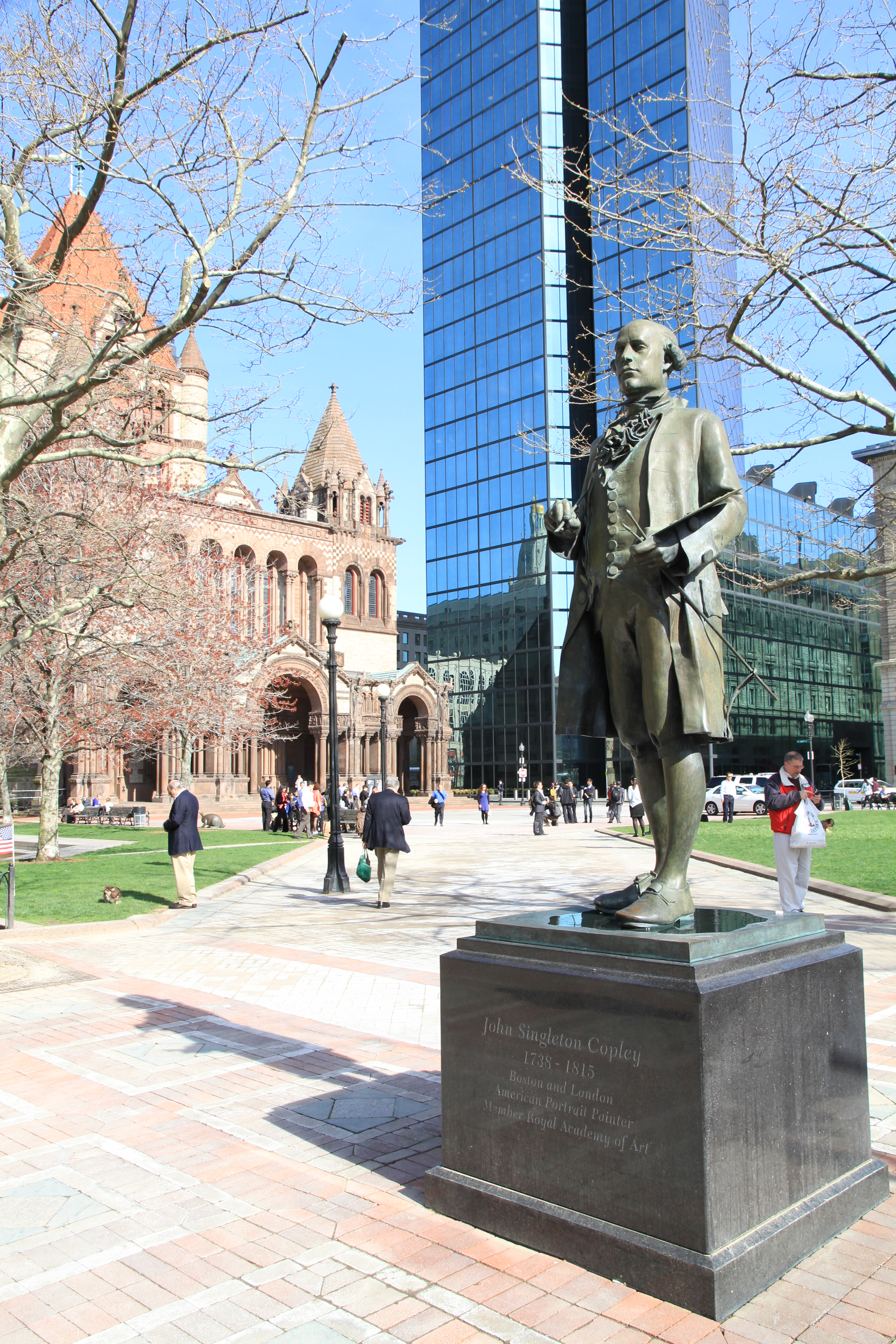
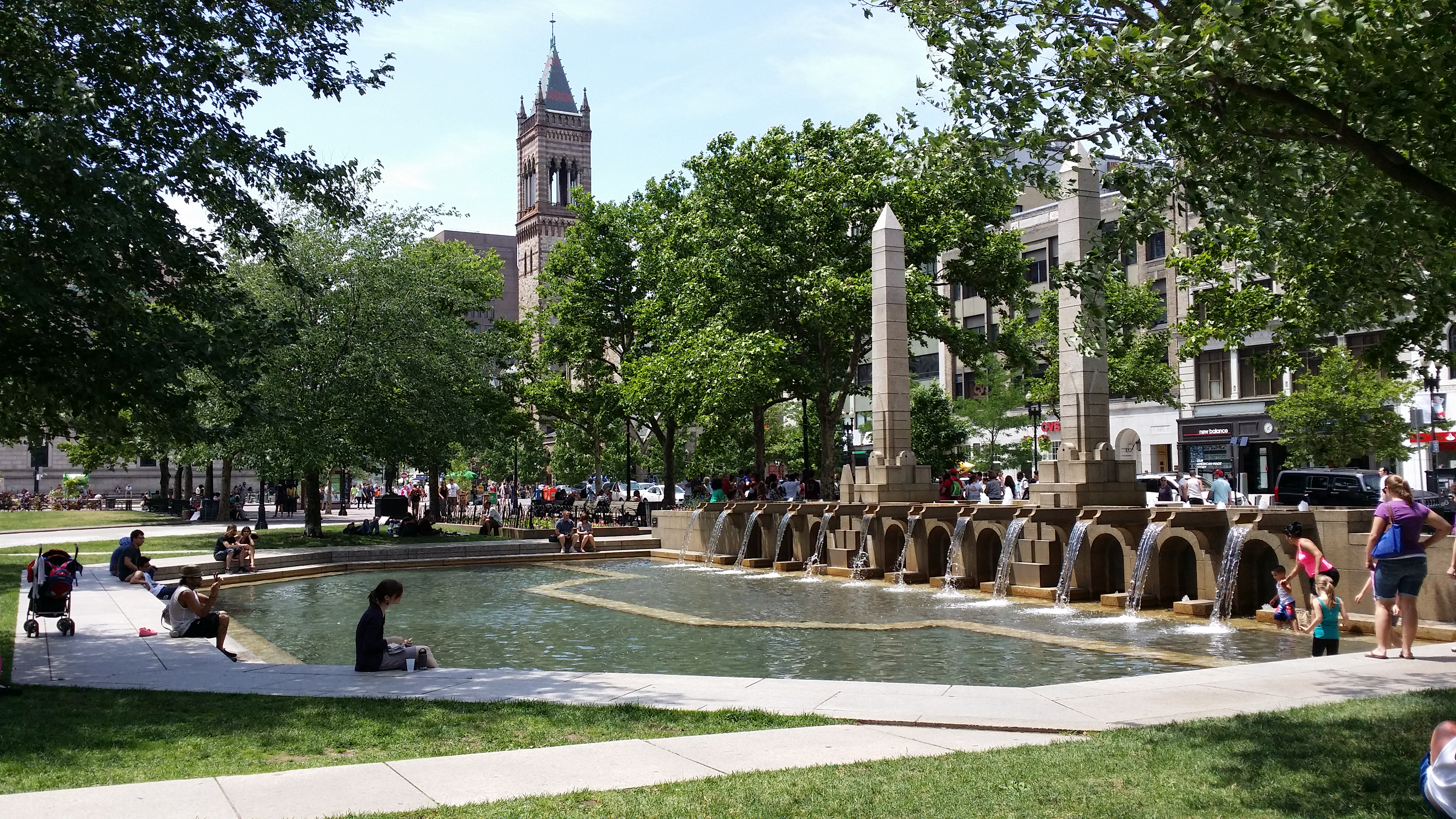
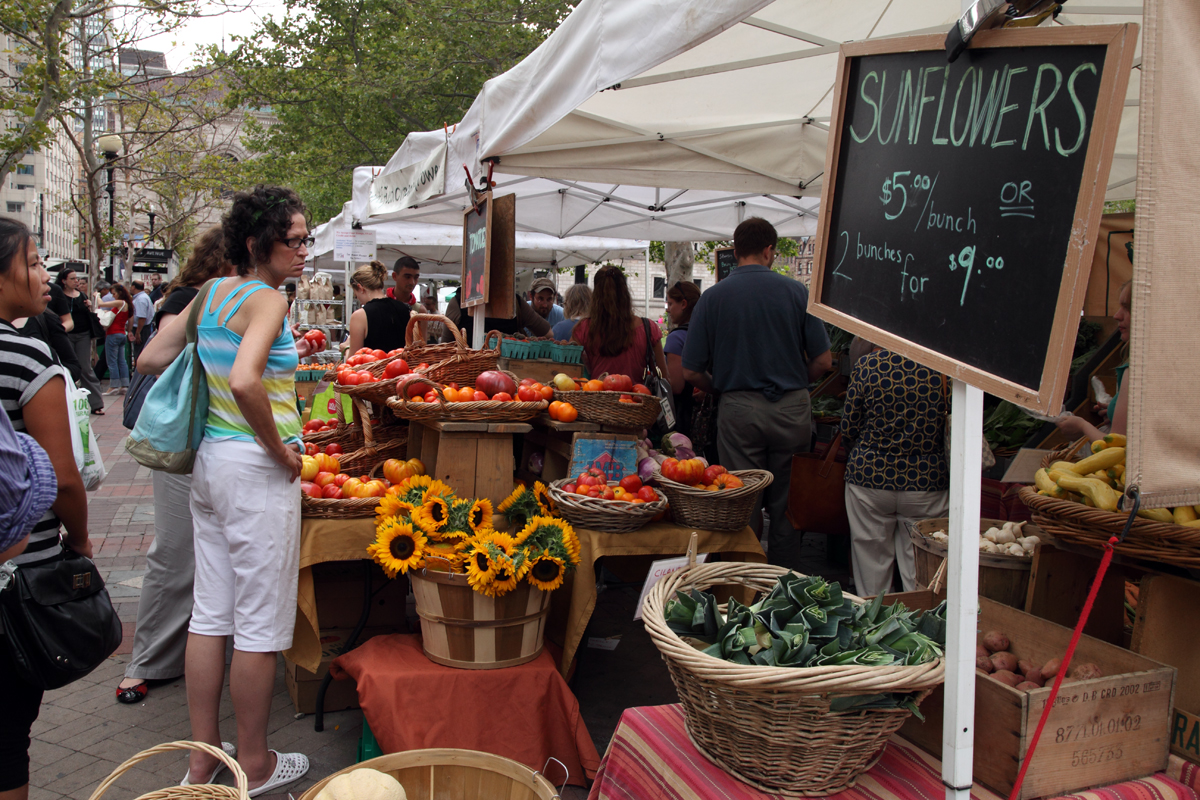
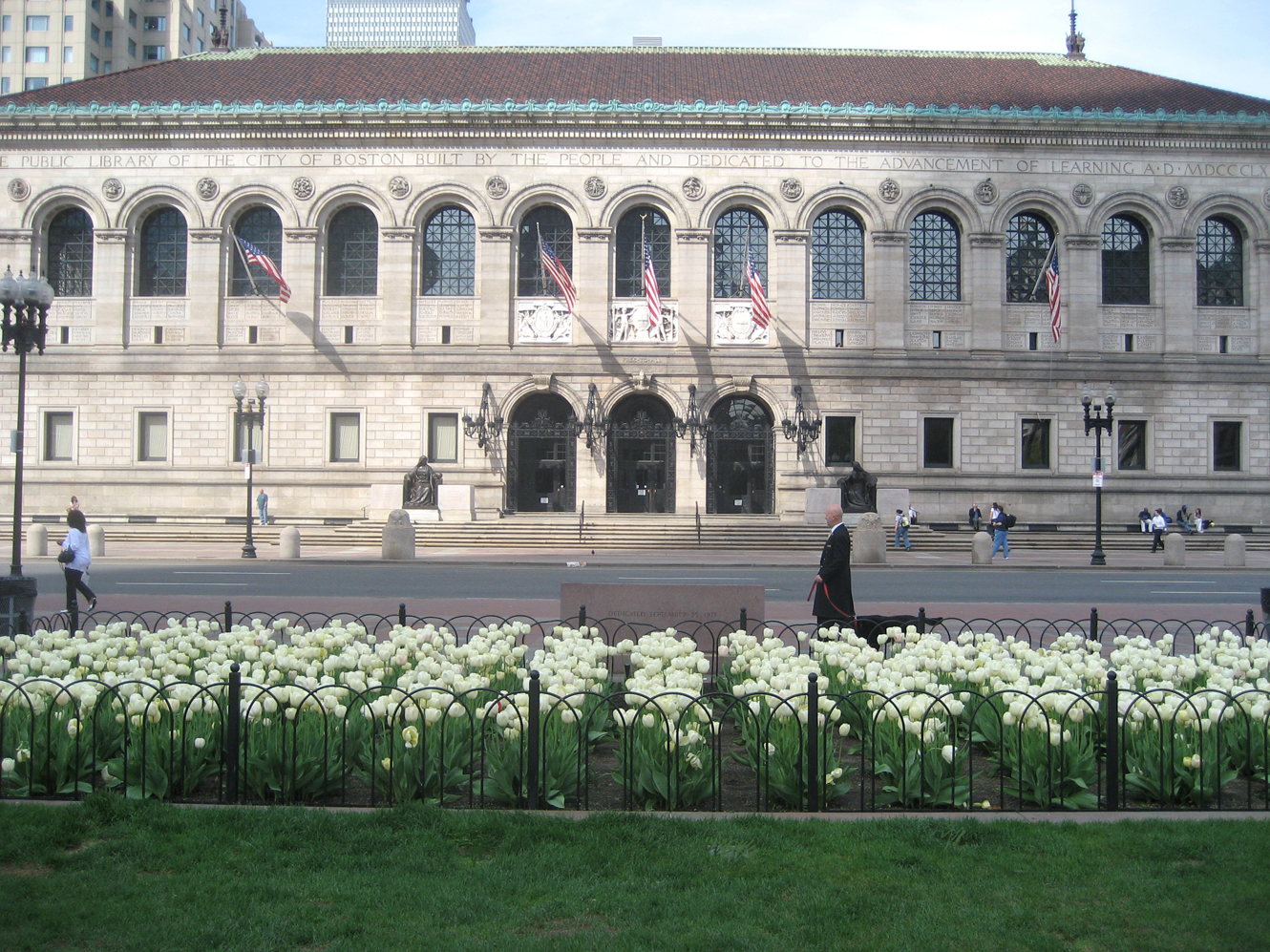
- Clockwise from top: Statue of John Singleton Copley in front of Trinity Church and the Hancock, the fountain, Boston Public Library, Farmers market.
- Interactive map of Copley Square
- Type: Public park
- Location: Boston, Massachusetts, U.S.
- Area: 2.4 acres (0.97 ha)
- Created: 1883
- Designer: Dean Abbott (1984)
- Owner: The City of Boston
- Public transit: Subway and bus; see "Transportation"

Copley Square /ˈkɒpli/ is a public square in Boston's Back Bay neighborhood, bounded by Boylston Street, Clarendon Street, St. James Avenue, and Dartmouth Street. The square is named for painter John Singleton Copley. Prior to 1883 it was known as Art Square due to its many cultural institutions, some of which remain today.

== Architecture ==
Several architectural landmarks are adjacent to the square:

- Old South Church (1873), by Charles Amos Cummings and Willard T. Sears in the Venetian Gothic Revival style
- Trinity Church (1877, Romanesque Revival), considered H. H. Richardson's tour de force
- Boston Public Library (1895), by Charles Follen McKim in a revival of Italian Renaissance style, incorporates artworks by John Singer Sargent, Edwin Austin Abbey, Daniel Chester French, and others
- The Fairmont Copley Plaza Hotel (1912) by Henry Janeway Hardenbergh in the Beaux-Arts style (on the site of the original Museum of Fine Arts, Boston)
- The John Hancock Tower (1976, late Modernist) by Henry N. Cobb, at 790 feet (240 m) New England's tallest building
- The BosTix Kiosk (1992, Postmodernist), at the corner of Dartmouth and Boylston streets, by Graham Gund with inspiration from Parisian park pavilions

Notable buildings later demolished:

- Peace Jubilee Coliseum (1869, demolished the same year) A temporary wooden structure, seating fifty thousand, was built on St. James Park for the 1869 National Peace Jubilee. Replaced by World's Peace Jubilee Coliseum (1872), which was replaced by the Museum of Fine Arts.
- Second Church (1874, sold 1912, demolished by 1914) A Gothic Revival church by N. J. Bradlee.
- Chauncy Hall School (c. 1874, demolished 1908), a tall-gabled High Victorian brick school building on Boylston St. near Dartmouth Street.
- Museum of Fine Arts (1876, demolished 1910) by John Hubbard Sturgis and Charles Brigham in the Gothic Revival style, was the first purpose-built public art museum in the world.
- S.S. Pierce Building, (1887, demolished 1958) by S. Edwin Tobey, "no masterpiece of architecture, [but] great urban design. A heap of dark Romanesque masonry, it anchored a corner of Copley Square as solidly as a mountain."
- Hotel Westminster (1897, demolished 1961), Trinity Place, by Henry E. Cregier; now replaced by the northeast corner of the new John Hancock Tower. Razed in 1961 by owner John Hancock Mutual Life Insurance Company for a parking lot.
- Grundmann Studios (1893, demolished 1917), home of the Boston Art Students Association (later known as the Copley Society), contained artist studios and Copley Hall, a popular venue for exhibitions, lectures and social gatherings.

== Public art ==
- Statue of Phillips Brooks, Augustus Saint-Gaudens (1907–1910)
- The Kahlil Gibran Memorial, Kahlil Gibran, nephew and godson of the poet (1977)
- The Tortoise and the Hare, Nancy Schön (1994)
- The Boston Marathon Centennial Monument, Mark Flannery (1994). Additions by Robert Shure and Robert Lamb (1996).
- Statue of John Singleton Copley, Lewis Cohen (2002)

== Public events ==
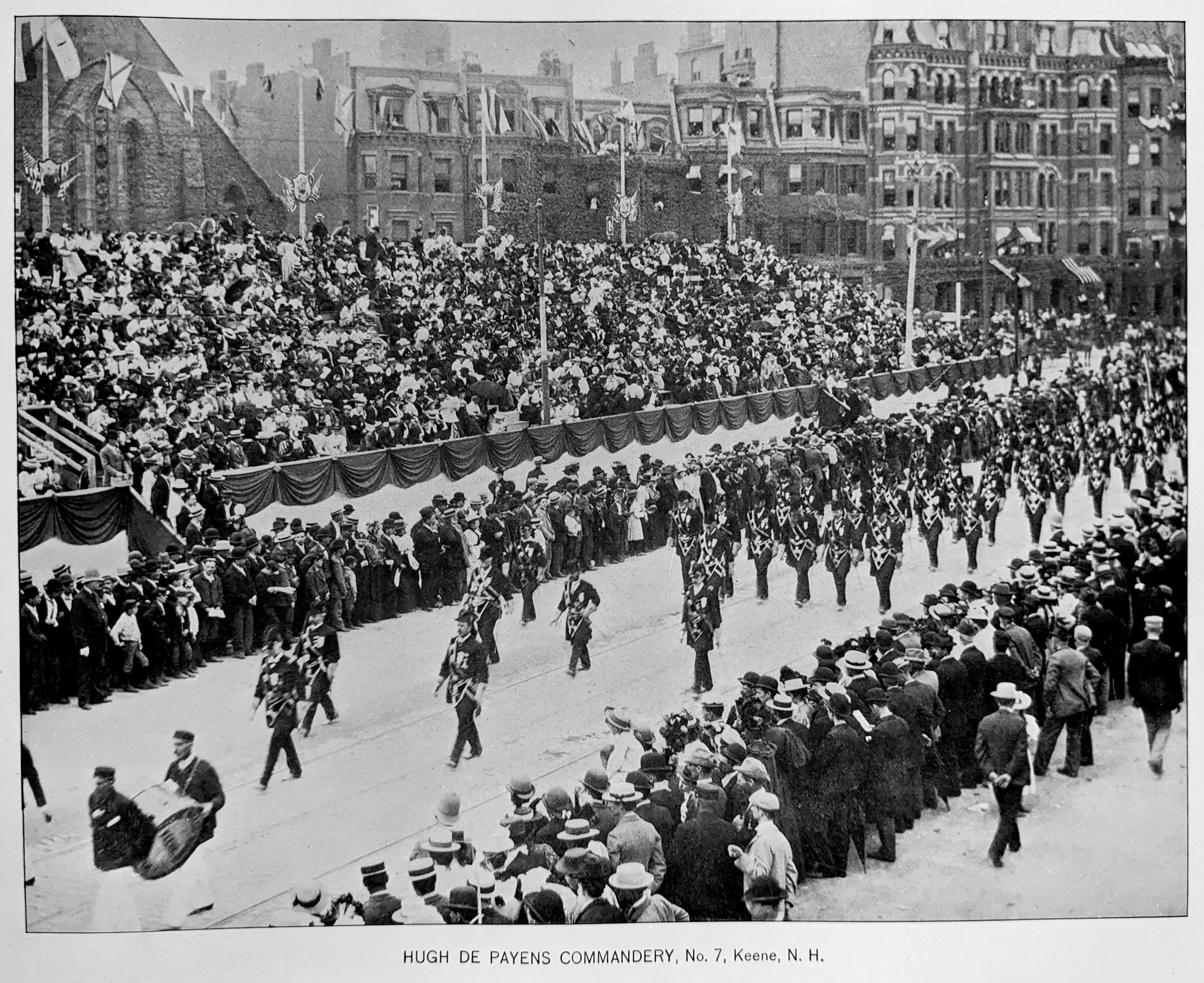
Masonic parade on Huntington Ave. through Copley Square, Boston, 1895

One of the most popular attractions in Copley Square is the Farmers Market, held Tuesdays and Fridays from May through November. (During the 2023–2024 reconstruction of the park, the market was held in front of the Public Library on Dartmouth.)

Annual events include First Night activities and ice sculpture competition, the Christmas tree lighting, the Boston Book Festival, and, for several years, the Boston Summer Arts Weekend. The park's central location also makes it a natural gathering place for protests and vigils.

The water level in the fountain pool can be lowered, turning it into a stage for concerts and theatrical performances.

== History ==
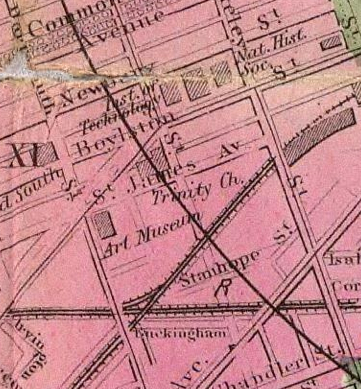
Detail of 1888 map, showing Art Square and vicinity. The map shows West End Street Railway trolley lines entering the square from Huntington Avenue (southwest), Clarendon Street (north), and Boylston Street (east).

A significant number of important Boston educational and cultural institutions were originally located adjacent to (or very near) Copley Square, reflecting 19th-century Boston's aspirations for the location as a center of culture and progress. These included the Museum of Fine Arts, the Massachusetts Institute of Technology, Harvard Medical School, the New England Museum of Natural History (today's Museum of Science), Trinity Church, the New Old South Church, the Boston Public Library, the American Academy of Arts and Sciences, the Massachusetts Normal Art School (today's Massachusetts College of Art and Design), the Horace Mann School for the Deaf, Boston University, Emerson College, and Northeastern University.

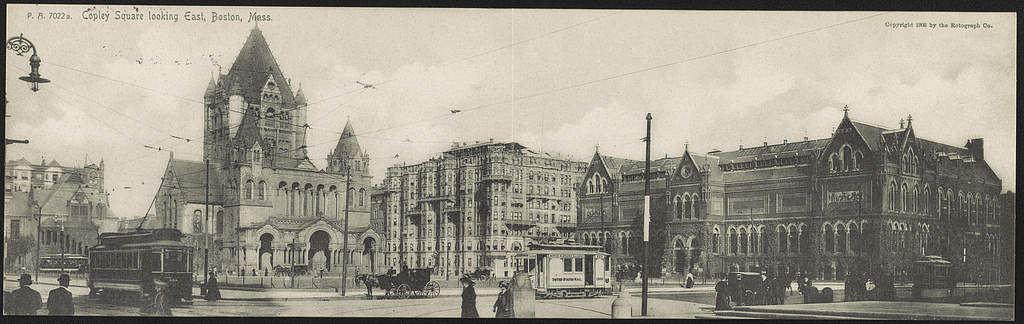
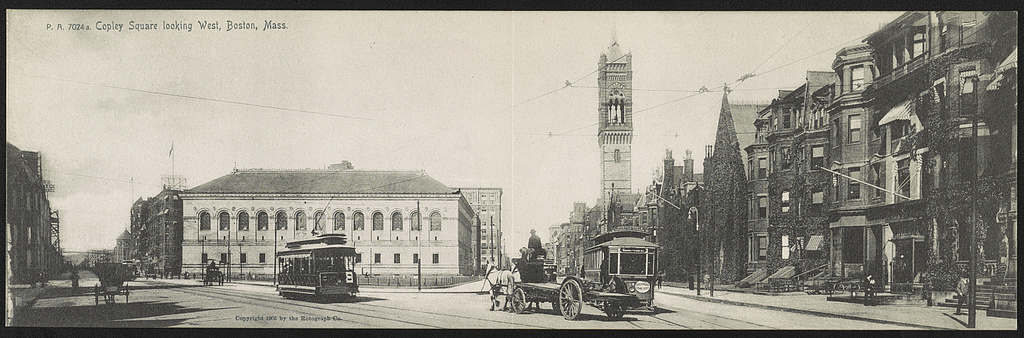
Copley Square, looking east (top) and west, c. 1905

By 1876, with the completion of the Museum of Fine Arts, Walter Muir Whitehill noted that "Copley Square which — unlike the rest of the Back Bay — had never been properly or reasonably laid out, was beginning to stumble into shape". But the land comprising the current square, bisected diagonally by Huntington Avenue, was still available for commercial development. The city purchased the larger triangle, then known as Art Square, in 1883 and dubbed it Copley Square. (Note: Some local wits suggested "Copley Skew" or "Copley Corners" as more appropriate for the non-square shape. Others were against honoring a man who had left America in 1774 and never returned.) The smaller plot, known as Trinity Triangle, was the subject of several lawsuits against the property owner, who planned to put up a six-story apartment building directly in front of Trinity Church. Foundations were laid but further construction was delayed by various injunctions. The city council appropriated funds for purchase of the triangle in 1885. Calls to close off Huntington between Dartmouth and Boylston streets began almost immediately, but that was not accomplished until 1968.

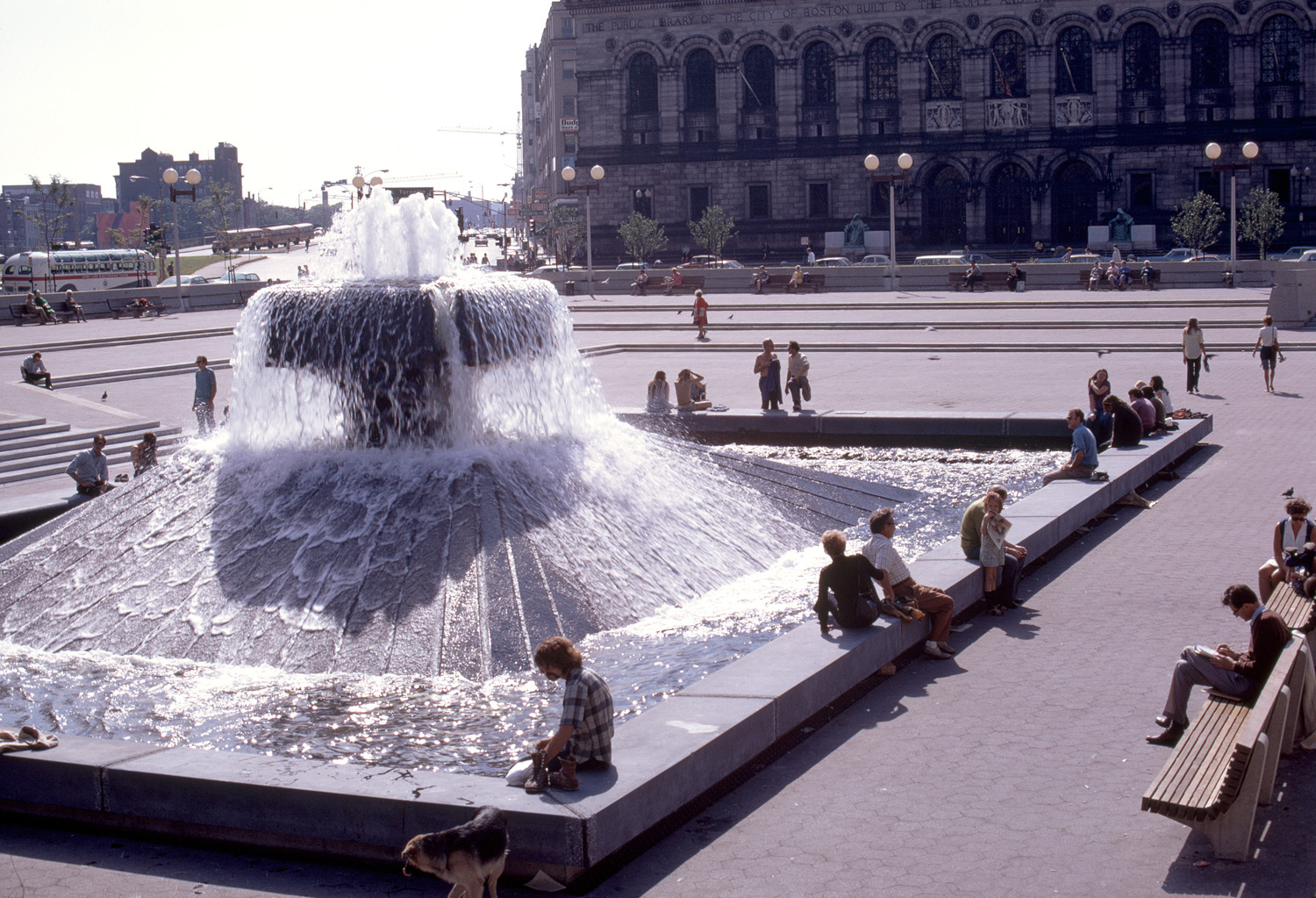
Fountain in Copley Square, c. 1970

In 1966, a proposal by the Watertown, Massachusetts, landscape design firm Sasaki, Dawson, DeMay was selected from 188 entrants in a national competition sponsored by the city and private development concerns. The design centered on a sunken terraced plaza, intended to separate the pedestrian from the noise and bustle of the surrounding streets, but it also isolated the square from the community. As the architecture critic Robert Campbell noted, "From the day it opened, it didn't work".

In 1983 the Copley Square Centennial Committee, consisting of representatives of business, civic and residential interests, was formed. They announced a new design competition, funded by a grant of $100,000 from the National Endowment for the Arts. The winner, announced in May 1984, was Dean Abbott of the New York firm Clarke & Rapuano. The park was raised to street-level and a lawn and planting beds were added. The fountain, which had rarely functioned as intended, was re-configured. The updated park was dedicated on June 18, 1989, and received mixed reviews.

By 2021 the park, now heavily used, was again in need of redesign; requirements included alleviating stress on existing trees, adding more trees, making the fountain safer, and prioritizing ease of maintenance. After a series of public meetings, the final proposal by Sasaki Associates was presented to the city in May 2022. Renovations began on July 20, 2023, with the expectation that they would be completed in sixteen months. Part of the renovated park reopened on New Year’s Day, 2025. The plaza and raised grove were reopened in January/February, 2025, with the fountain, lawn, and perimeter sidewalks scheduled for completion after the 2025 Boston Marathon. As of May 2025, construction is ongoing but is expected to be completed by the end of the year.

The non-profit membership organization Friends of Copley Square was formed in 1992 as a successor to the Copley Square Centennial Committee. It raises funds for care of the square's plantings, fountain, and monuments, and also manages the Copley Square Charitable trust.

The Boston Marathon foot race has finished at Copley Square since 1986. A memorial celebrating the race's 100th running in 1996 is located in the park, near the corner of Boylston and Dartmouth streets.

=== Unrealized proposals ===
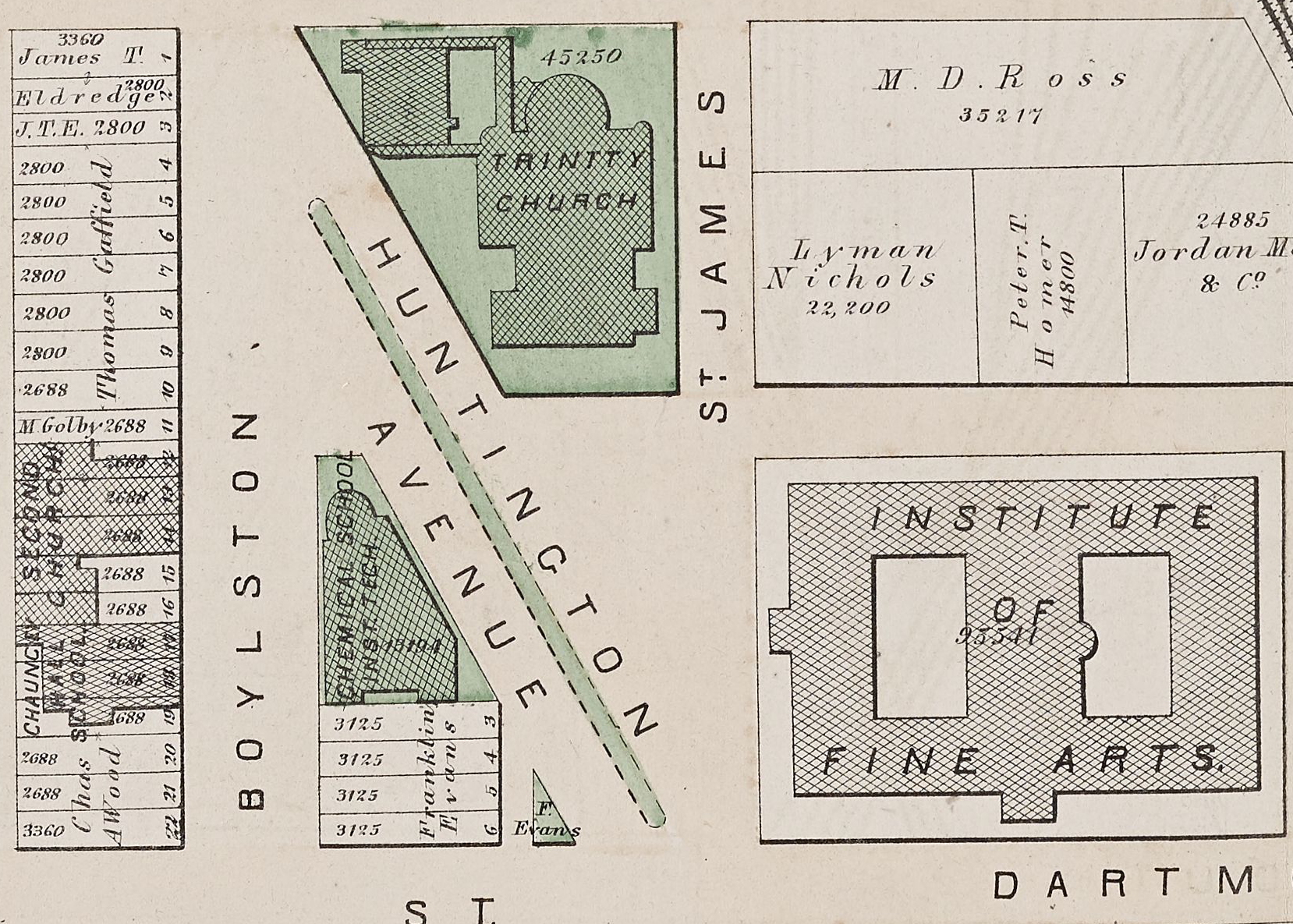
Surveyor's map of Copley Square, Boston, 1874

- 1874 A surveyor's map shows a "Chemical School, Inst. Tech." (never built) and four house lots on the larger triangle.
- 1894 A circular, sunken garden combining designs by Rotch & Tilden and Walker and Kimball, ringed with trees and marble balustrades, centered on a small fountain.
- 1912 A plan by architect Frank Bourne eliminated the Huntington Avenue crossing and sunk the square 2.5 feet below street level. One version featured an enormous monumental column in the center of the plaza.
- 1914 Landscape architect Arthur Shurtleff envisioned a circle of trees around the Brewer Fountain, which would be moved from Boston Common.
- 1927 A proposal for a State War Memorial, from plans by Guy Lowell, placed a large, cylindrical granite structure in a basin. The inner chamber rose fifty feet to a domed ceiling and the memorial was topped with bronze representation of Hope.
- 2012 A juried competition held by SHIFTBoston invited designs for creative illumination. First prize was awarded to the firm Khoury Levit Fong for their conceptual chandelier of LEDs suspended over the square.

=== Boston Marathon bombing ===
On April 15, 2013, around 2:50 pm (about three hours after the first runners crossed the line) two bombs exploded‍—‌one near the finish line near the Boston Public Library, the other some seconds later and one block west. Three people were killed and at least 183 injured, at least 14 of whom lost limbs.

== Transportation ==
Copley is served by several forms of public transportation:

- Copley Station on the MBTA Green Line
- Several MBTA bus routes; the square is a major transfer point and terminal for several local and express routes
- Logan Express to Logan International Airport
- Nearby Back Bay station for MBTA Orange Line, MBTA Commuter Rail, and Amtrak

Major roads:

- Massachusetts Turnpike
- Boylston Street

== Sources ==
- Pokorny, Margaret, ed. (October 23, 2002). Copley Square: The Story of Boston's Art Square (PDF). Boston: Friends of Copley Square. Archived from the original (PDF) on May 28, 2013.
- Shand-Tucci, Douglass (1999). Built in Boston: City and Suburb 1800–2000. Foreword by Walter Muir Whitehill (Revised and Expanded ed.). Amherst: University of Massachusetts Press. ISBN 1-55849-201-1. LCCN 99016750.
- Whitehill, Walter Muir (1968). Boston: A Topographical History (Second, enlarged ed.). Cambridge, Massachusetts: The Belknap Press of Harvard University Press. ISBN 0-674-07951-5.
