= The Tortoise & the Hare (book) =

Picture book

- First edition
- Author: Aesop
- Illustrator: Jerry Pinkney
- Language: English
- Genre: Children's literature, picture book, Fable
- Published: 2013 (Little, Brown and Company)
- Publication place: USA
- Media type: Print (hardback, paperback)
- Pages: 40 (unpaginated)
- ISBN: 9780316183567
- OCLC: 880941023

The Tortoise & the Hare is a 2013 wordless picture book of Aesop's classic fable and is illustrated by Jerry Pinkney. It is about a tortoise and a hare that compete in a foot race with the tortoise surprisingly winning.

== Reception ==
School Library Journal, in a review of The Tortoise & the Hare, wrote "Pinkney has created yet another stunning interpretation of a classic tale in this virtually wordless picture book. .. Pinkney takes care to show Tortoise overcoming challenges and Hare demonstrating good sportsmanship and healthy competition."

Publishers Weekly, Booklist, and Kirkus Reviews all gave starred reviews.

The Horn Book Magazine wrote "Pinkney brilliantly illustrates another well-known Aesop fable." and concluded "The richly detailed illustrations are lively and humorous, but what makes this retelling particularly ingenious is Pinkney's use of the oft-quoted moral in a cumulative progression both to recount the action and provide dramatic tension: "Slow / slow and / slow and steady / slow and steady wins / slow and steady wins the / slow and steady wins the race!""

The Tortoise & the Hare has also been reviewed by The Bulletin of the Center for Children's Books, and Children's Book and Media Review.
