= John Park (educator) =

John Park (1775–1852) was an educator and newspaperman in Boston, Massachusetts, in the 19th century. He established The Repertory newspaper. In 1811 he founded the Boston Lyceum for the Education of Young Ladies located on Mount Vernon Street in Beacon Hill, and attended by Margaret Fuller and Frances Sargent Osgood. As of 1816 the school had a library of 3,000 volumes, as well as "a complete planetarium, a camera lucida, and microscope." Park was elected a member of the American Antiquarian Society in 1831. The society holds a nearly complete run of original copies of The Repertory, as well as the related titles that proceed and follow it in its collections. Park's daughter, Louisa Jane Hall, was a writer and literary critic.
