= William C. Nell House =

Historic house in Massachusetts, United States

- U.S. National Register of Historic Places
- U.S. National Historic Landmark
- U.S. National Historic Landmark District – Contributing property
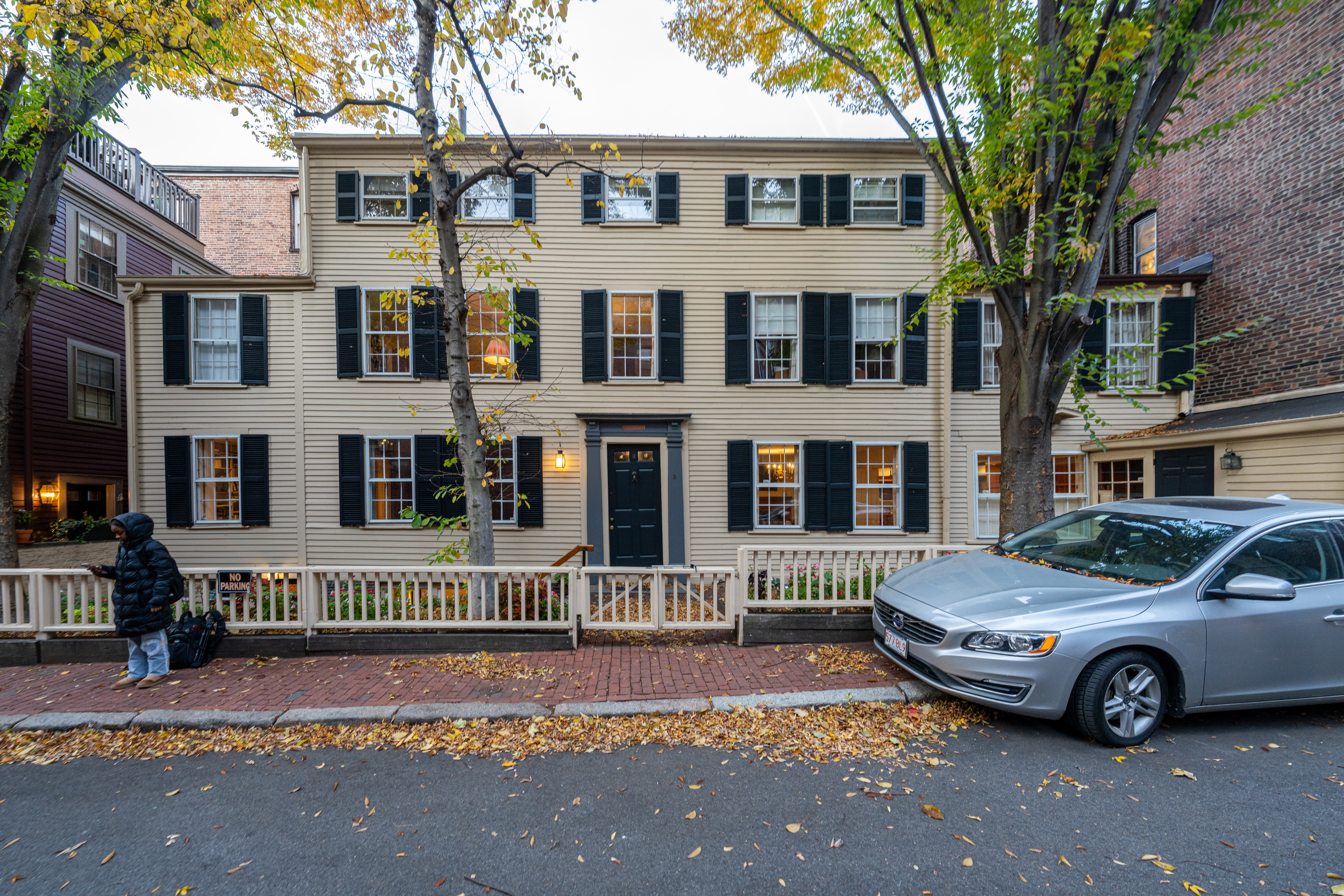

- Location within Boston Location within Massachusetts Location within the United States
- Location: 3 Smith Court; Boston, Massachusetts
- Coordinates: 42°21′28″N 71°3′53″W
- Built: 1800
- Architect: William Lancaster; Benajah Bringham
- Architectural style: Federal
- Part of: Beacon Hill Historic District (ID66000130)
- NRHP reference No.: 76001979

Significant dates
- Added to NRHP: May 11, 1976
- Designated NHL: May 11, 1976
- Designated NHLDCP: October 15, 1966

The William C. Nell House is a former boarding home (now a private residence) located in 3 Smith Court in the Beacon Hill neighborhood of Boston, Massachusetts, United States. It sits opposite the former African Meeting House, now the Museum of African American History.

It is one of the Smith Court residences on the Black Heritage Trail of the Boston African American National Historic Site walking tours. The homes on Smith Court typify the types of homes built in the before 1803 and of many of the African Americans who lived in the city at that time. Other Smith Court residences on the tour include 5, 7, 7A, 4 and 2 Smith Court; They are private residences and are not open to the public.

== Architecture ==
3 Smith Court was built between 1798 and 1800 by two white bricklayers and is now known as the James Scott and William C. Nell House. The narrow building consists of painted clapboarding on the front; the back of the house is a windowless brick wall. This type of construction was typical for Boston before 1803 and especially for residences on alleys.

== Residents ==
Starting in 1830, 3 Smith Court was rented to numerous African American men and their families.

=== James Scott ===
James Scott, the longest resident of 3 Smith Court, lived there for nearly 50 years. He was a tenant from 1839 to 1865 and owned the property from 1865 until his death in 1888. Scott was born in Virginia and worked as a clothing dealer in Boston.

James Scott's Underground Railroad activity is documented in the records of the Boston Vigilance Committee. In 1851, Scott was arrested in his shop and charged with spearheading the rescue of Shadrach Minkins from federal custody. Like John Coburn, whose home is also on the walking tour, Scott was arrested, tried, and acquitted for the 1851 rescue of Shadrach Minkins.

It is not clear whether he participated in this rescue (he was acquitted for lack of evidence), but Scott did assist other fugitive slaves. For example, on July 18, 1856, James Scott boarded self-emancipated slave Henry Jackson and his family at 3 Smith Court.

=== William Cooper Nell ===
Abolitionist William Cooper Nell was also a tenant from 1850 to 1857. Nell was one of Boston's most forceful advocates for school integration in 1855. He was the author of several histories, including Colored Patriots of the American Revolution, and he worked at various times for the Liberator, the Massachusetts Anti-Slavery Society, and the Frederick Douglass’ Paper. He was also very active in the Boston Vigilance Committee and he sheltered or aided numerous self-emancipated slaves at 3 Smith Court. He is considered the nation's first published black historian. In recognition of his contributions, the house was designated a National Historic Landmark.

== Smith Court residences ==
As early as the 1790s, African Americans began to reside on the north slope of Beacon Hill. The area of lower Joy Street and Smith Court was an important center of Boston's 19th black community. Today, the historic homes on Smith Court, along with the African Meeting House and the Abiel Smith School, are the best preserved physical locales available for understanding the history of African Americans in Boston.

4 Smith Court, a four-story brick building, is typical of residential structures built in Boston between 1885 and 1915. In the 1880s, Boston experienced an influx of immigrants from Eastern and Southern Europe. Many of the newly arrived lived in densely populated areas of Boston, including the north slope of Beacon Hill, the West End, and the North End. They moved primarily into areas that had been partially black neighborhoods, just as African Americans were relocating to Roxbury, Dorchester, and the South End.

== Gallery ==
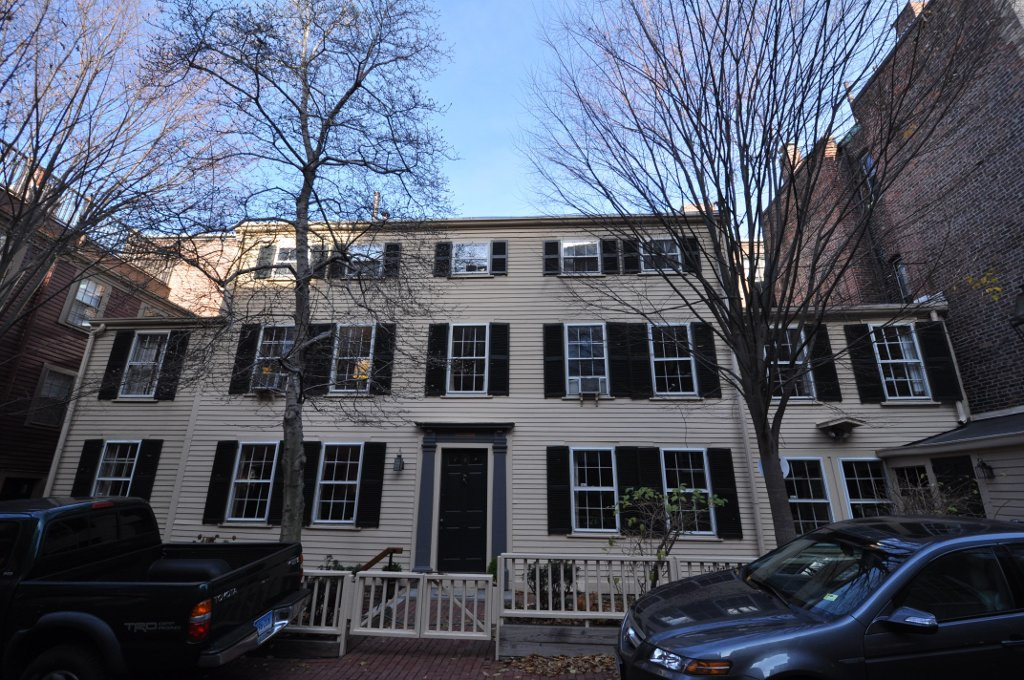
William Cooper Nell House, 2012

== See also ==
- List of National Historic Landmarks in Boston
- National Register of Historic Places listings in northern Boston, Massachusetts
