= Headquarters House (Boston) =

Historic house in Massachusetts, United States

- William H. Prescott House
- U.S. National Register of Historic Places
- U.S. National Historic Landmark
- U.S. National Historic Landmark District – Contributing property
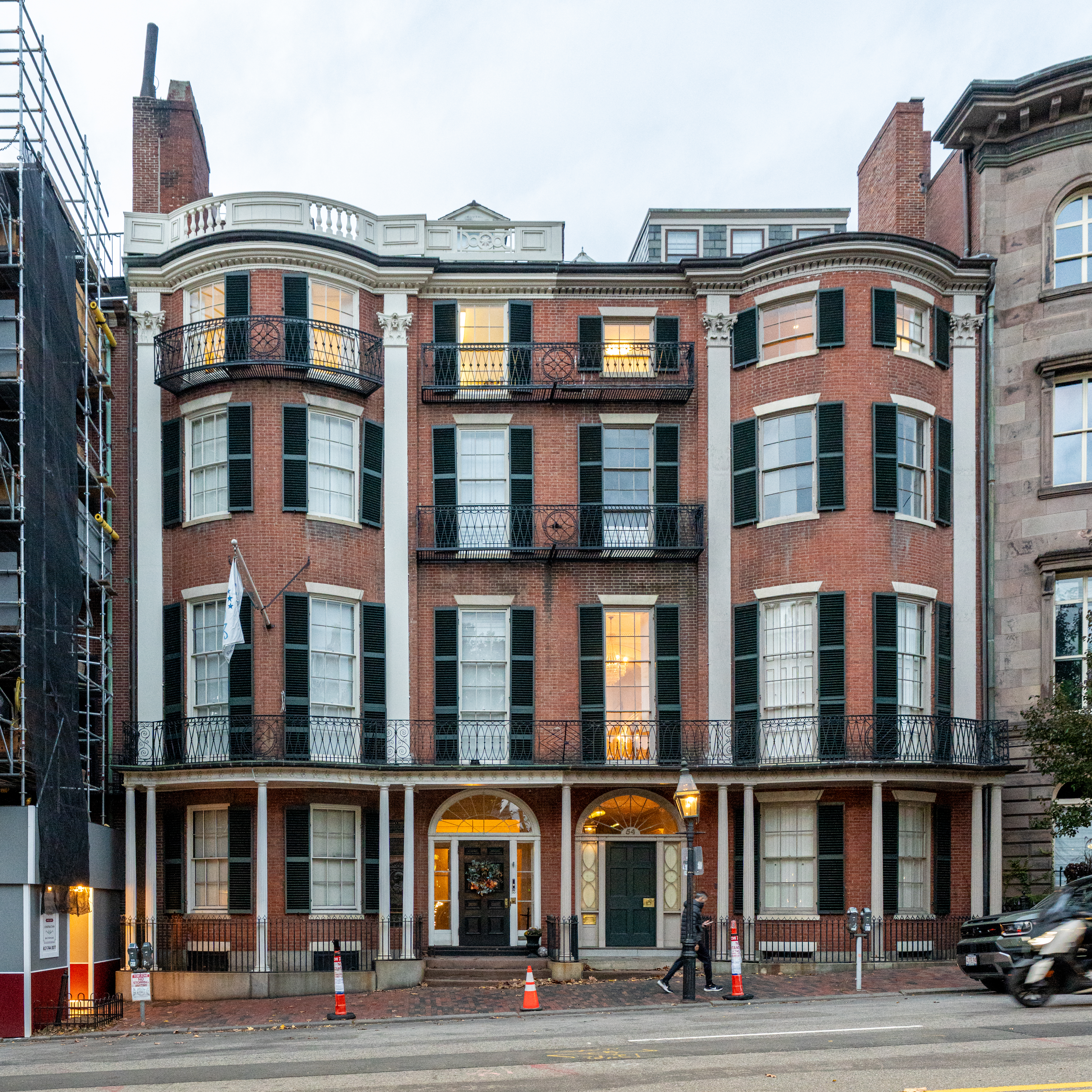
- Of the two units depicted here, the Prescott House is the one on the left.

- Location within Boston Location within Massachusetts Location within the United States
- Location: 55 Beacon Street, Boston, Massachusetts
- Coordinates: 42°21′23.6″N 71°4′5.7″W
- Area: less than one acre
- Built: 1808
- Architect: Benjamin, Asher
- Architectural style: Federal
- Website: William Hickling Prescott House
- Part of: Beacon Hill Historic District (ID66000130)
- NRHP reference No.: 66000765

Significant dates
- Added to NRHP: October 15, 1966
- Designated NHL: December 29, 1964
- Designated NHLDCP: October 15, 1966

William Hickling Prescott House, also known as the Headquarters House, is an historic house museum located at 55 Beacon Street on Beacon Hill in Boston, Massachusetts. It is the western portion of a double townhouse at 54–55 Beacon Street. The townhouse, built in 1808 to a design by Asher Benjamin, was designated a National Historic Landmark in 1964 for its association with William Hickling Prescott (1796–1859), one of the nation's first historians. The house is now a museum operated by the Massachusetts chapter of the National Society of the Colonial Dames of America, which purchased it for its headquarters in 1944.

== Description and history ==
Built in 1808, the twin houses were designed by architect Asher Benjamin. Still nearly mirror images of one another, they are four stories in height and three bays wide. The outer two bays of each unit are part of a rounded bay front, delineated by pilasters rising from the top of the first story porch to the roof. The porch is supported by a Doric colonnade, and follows the line of the rounded bays. The doorways are in the innermost bays, flanked by sidelight windows and topped by a fanlight.

The houses' original owner was James Smith Colburn, a successful Boston merchant. He commissioned Asher Benjamin to build the double town houses on land he purchased from the Mount Vernon Proprietors. Originally, the structures were free-standing and would have had a water view (before the filling of the area that is now the Boston Public Garden). They were the height of fashion in the Early Republic. Colburn intended to reside at 55 Beacon Street, while 54 would belong to his sister and her husband, William Gill. The Gills never moved into 54 Beacon Street and instead sold it to Nathan Appleton. In 1819, it was purchased by William Appleton. The home remained in the family after his death and in 1913, it was acquired by George von Lengerke Meyer, who was married to Appleton's granddaughter. The residence was divided into two parts in 1942 and is now an apartment building.

Colburn lived at 55 Beacon Street until 1819, when he sold it to Samuel D. Ward, who rented it to various tenants. In 1833, it was bought by Augustus Thorndike. William Hickling Prescott purchased the house in 1845. A nearly blind historian from a prominent Boston family, Prescott lived there from 1845 to 1859. He had celebrated novelist William Makepeace Thackeray as a houseguest. In 1872, it was sold by the Prescott estate to Franklin Gordon Dexter, son-in-law of William Appleton. The Dexters made significant changes to the house: updating the stairwell, adding an elevator and reconfiguring Prescott's library into a dining room.

55 Beacon Street was acquired in 1944 by the Massachusetts chapter of the National Society of the Colonial Dames of America for use as its headquarters, a role it still serves. The Dames restored Prescott's study to its original state in 1968, based on historical documents. The house was designated a U.S. National Historic Landmark in 1964, and was listed on National Register of Historic Places in 1966, for its association with Prescott, who gained a reputation for his books on Spanish (and Spanish colonial) history. His 1837 History of the Conquest of Mexico received great acclaim both in the United States and in Europe. Due to his blindness (caused by an incident during a bar brawl), he employed researchers and secretaries to acquire documents and prepare his manuscripts.

The units are memorialized as a Victorian dollhouse at the Cayuga Art Museum in Auburn, New York.

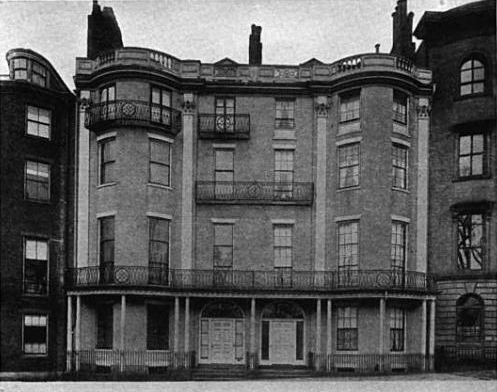
The house in a photo published in 1912

== See also ==
- List of National Historic Landmarks in Massachusetts
- National Register of Historic Places listings in northern Boston, Massachusetts
