= New-England Repertory =

- Type: Early National Era Newspaper
- Format: Broadsheet
- Owner: John Park
- Founded: 1803
- Headquarters: Boston, Massachusetts

The New-England Repertory was a newspaper published from 1803 through 1820.

It was first published in Newburyport, Massachusetts, but was moved to Boston in 1804 and renamed The Repertory. It was published under this name and The Repertory & General Advertiser until 1820.
