= Garden of Peace =

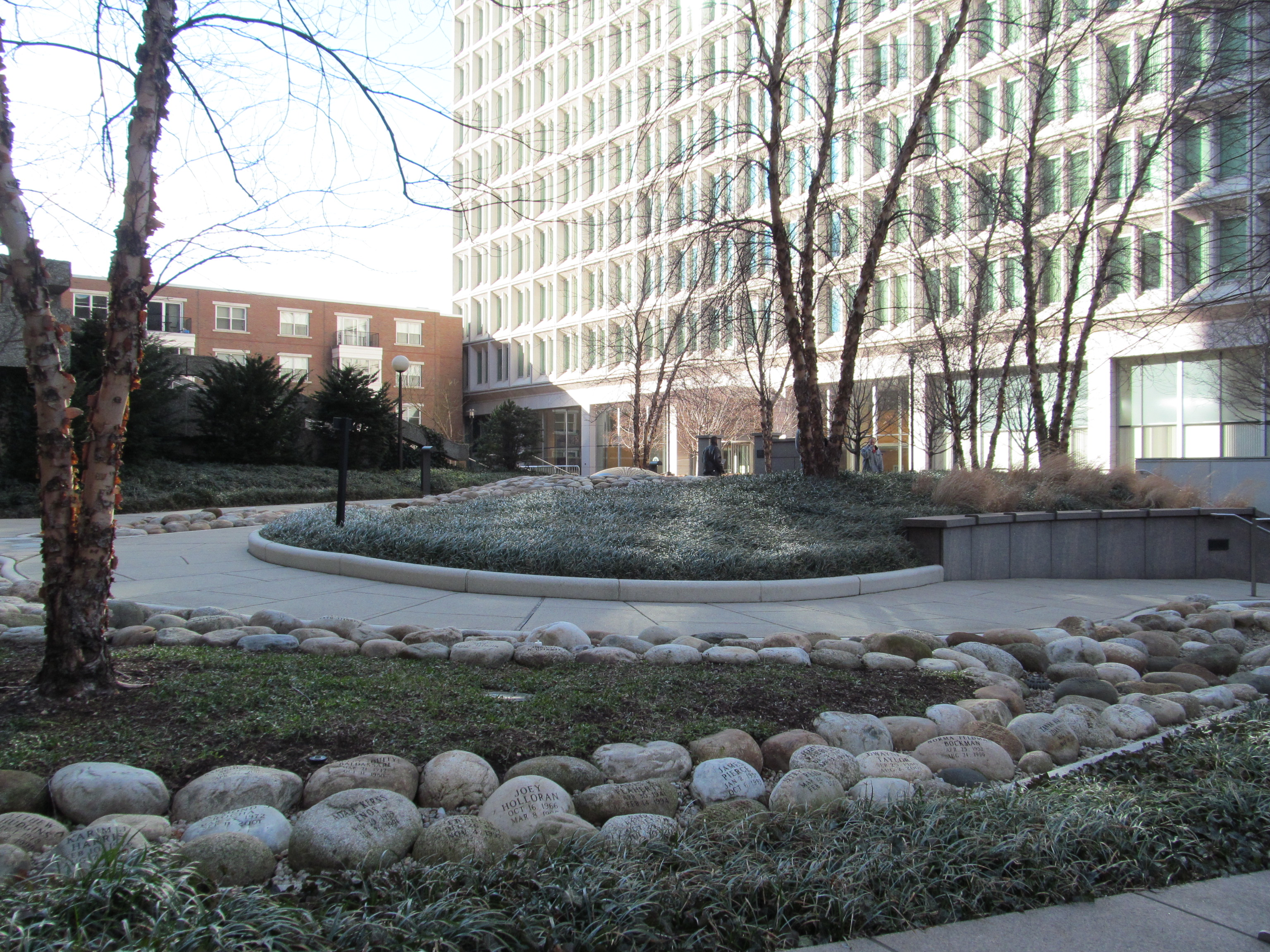
- Garden of Peace
- Interactive map of Garden of Peace
- Type: Memorial
- Nearest city: Boston, Massachusetts
- Coordinates: 42.36004°N 71.06180°W
- Website: mass.gov/orgs/garden-of-peace

The Garden of Peace in Boston, Massachusetts, is a memorial commemorating victims of homicide:

The Garden is the Massachusetts memorial to victims of homicide, a place where families, friends, and the larger community may remember and honor the lives of those taken by violence. It's an enduring reminder of the impact of violence and a visual testament of the need to eliminate it. At the same time, the Garden serves as a symbol of hope, peace, and renewal.

The garden design consists of a dry streambed containing smooth river stones engraved with the names of homicide victims, and includes two sculptures: "Tragic Density" and "Ibis Ascending".

The Garden of Peace encourages change by raising awareness and by serving as an anti-violence educational tool. Local and statewide violence prevention and community-building organizations are welcome and incorporate visits to the Garden into their educational programs. Visitors to Boston are invited to enjoy the beauty of the Garden's park-like setting and to make the experience of the site part of their visit to historic Boston.

Each year the Board of Directors and volunteers organize an event to dedicate the new names of homicide victims being added to the Garden. The Honor Program is usually held on the third Thursday in September.
