= Rose Standish Nichols =

American landscape architect

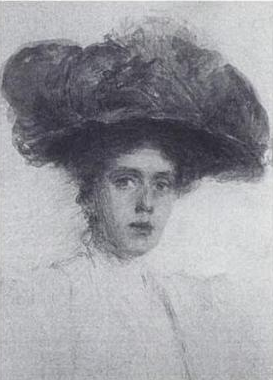
- Nichols in 1912
- Born: January 11, 1872; Boston, Massachusetts, US
- Died: 1960 (aged 87–88); Boston, Massachusetts, US
- Education: Charles A. Platt (tutor)
- Alma mater: MIT School of Architecture and Planning École des Beaux-Arts
- Occupation: Landscape architect
- Known for: Landscape architect, peace activist
- Parent(s): Arthur H. Nichols and Elizabeth Fisher Homer Nichols

Rose Standish Nichols (1872–1960) was an American landscape architect from Boston, Massachusetts. Nichols worked for some 70 clients in the United States and abroad. Collaborators included David Adler, Mac Griswold, Howard Van Doren Shaw, and others. She also wrote articles about gardens for popular magazines such as House Beautiful and House & Garden, and published three books about European gardens.

== Early life and education ==
Nichols was the daughter of Arthur H. Nichols and Elizabeth Fisher Homer Nichols, and a niece of Augustus Saint-Gaudens. Her siblings included Margaret Homer A. Shurcliff (married to Arthur Shurcliff) and Marian Clarke Nichols. Rose Nichols lived most of her life at 55 Mt. Vernon Street in the Beacon Hill neighborhood of Boston.

Nichols trained with Charles A. Platt, Inigo Trigs; Constant-Désiré Despradelle at Massachusetts Institute of Technology; with Benjamin Watson at the Bussey Institute, Harvard University; and at the École des Beaux-Arts. Nichols began studies at MIT in 1899, where she completed only a few courses at MIT as a non-degree, special student. She also travelled in Europe, visiting parks and gardens such as those at Hampton Court Palace, England. Around 1921 Nichols served the American Society of Landscape Architects as Chairman of the Committee on the Garden Club of America.

== Career ==
=== Garden design ===
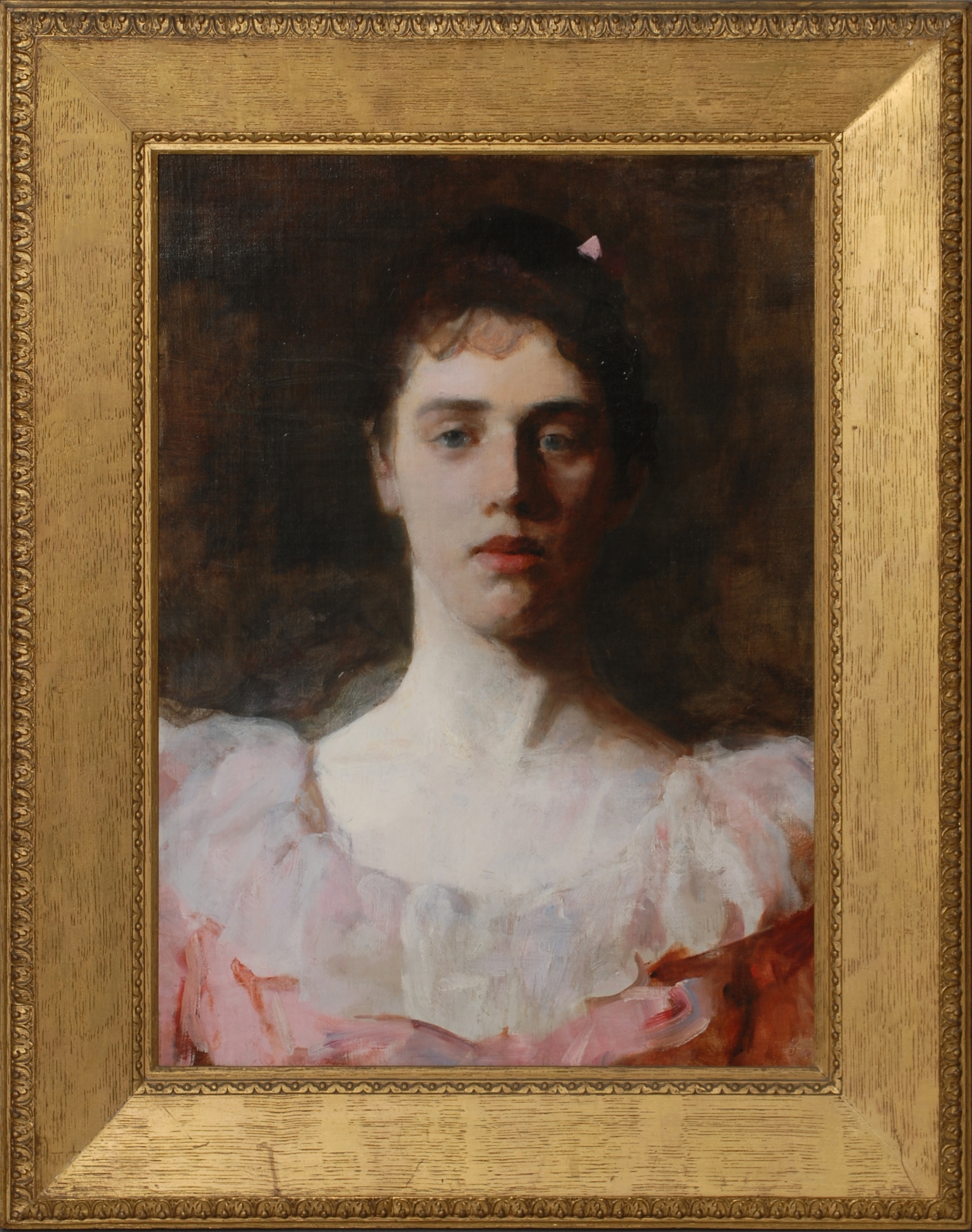
Rose Standish Nichols in 1890, portrait by Margarita Pumpelly Smyth

Nichols’ first commissioned project was her family’s garden at 'the Mastlands' in 1895, their summer home in Cornish, New Hampshire. Rose added a piazza and laid out a formal garden enclosed with low stone walls. The focal point of the garden was an apple tree that spread over a low pool and curving benches. This project was included in Guy Lowell’s book American Gardens (1902). She often designed in accordance with Beaux-Arts style, evident in her tranquil, cohesive and approachable garden designs. Nichols' designs appear in Georgia, Arizona and California, though most of her work appears in Lake Forest, Illinois. Many of her commissioned works appeared in Classic Country Estates of Lake Forest; A Preservation Foundation Guide to National Register Properties, Lake Forest, Illinois. Nichols often collaborated with the architects David Adler, Mac Griswold and Howard Shaw.

=== Author ===
Her 1902 book English Pleasure Gardens was followed by two more volumes, Italian Pleasure Gardens (1928) and Spanish and Portuguese Gardens (1924). These books were intended as guidebooks to Europe’s lesser-known gardens. Both English Pleasure Gardens and Spanish and Portuguese Gardens were illustrated with drawings by the author; Italian Pleasure Gardens was illustrated with photographs Nichols took in her travels. Nichols took advantage of her social connections to access and document private gardens all over Europe. She transformed these experiences into a career as a landscape architecture critic, publishing over fifty articles on European landscape design. These articles appeared in house and design magazines such as House Beautiful, Horticulture, and House and Garden.

=== Activism ===
In addition to her professional work as a landscape architect, Nichols was a peace activist. She established a discussion group, The League of Small Nations; participants included Mabel Harlakenden Hall Churchill (wife of the American novelist Winston Churchill) and Edith Wilson. The group was a precursor to the Foreign Policy Association. Nichols also traveled to peace conferences in Europe. In addition, she helped establish the Women's International League for Peace and Freedom.

In 1919 Nichols was elected an officer of the Boston Equal Suffrage Association. In 1937, Nichols attended an event organized by the New York Society of the Descendants of Signers of the Independence Declaration.

Portraits of Nichols have been made by Taylor Greer and Margarita Smyth.

She is buried at Mount Auburn Cemetery.

== Gardens and parks ==
Rose Standish Nichols worked on parks and gardens for approximately 70 clients, in the United States and abroad:

- Cornish Colony Gallery and Museum, Cornish, New Hampshire - 1896.
- House of Four Winds, Lake Forest, Illinois.
- Haven Wood, estate of Edward Ryerson, Lake Forest, Illinois.
- Grey Towers, house of Gifford Pinchot and Cornelia Bryce Pinchot, Milford, Pennsylvania.
- House of Lloyd R. Smith (now Villa Terrace Museum and Gardens), Milwaukee, Wisconsin.
- Athens, Greece
- Estate of Mr. and Mrs. Dexter and Emilie A. (Hoyt) Cummings, 1460 North Lake Road, Lake Forest, Illinois (1929)

== Selected bibliography ==
- "Individuality in Interior Decoration," House Beautiful. June, 1910.
- "How to Make a Small Garden," House Beautiful. August 1912.
- "The Small Garden Largely Planned, Designed for P.A. Waller, Kewanee, Illinois," House Beautiful. November, 1922.
- "A Hill Top Garden in New Hampshire (Dingleton House)," House Beautiful. March, 1924.
- "The Pleasure Gardens of the Great Moguls," House Beautiful. March, 1927.

== See also ==
- Nichols House Museum
- Cornish Art Colony
- Boston Women's Heritage Trail
