= Beacon Hill, Boston =

Historic neighborhood in Massachusetts

Coordinates: 42.3583°N 71.0661°W

- Beacon Hill Historic District
- U.S. National Register of Historic Places
- U.S. National Historic Landmark District
- Boston Landmark
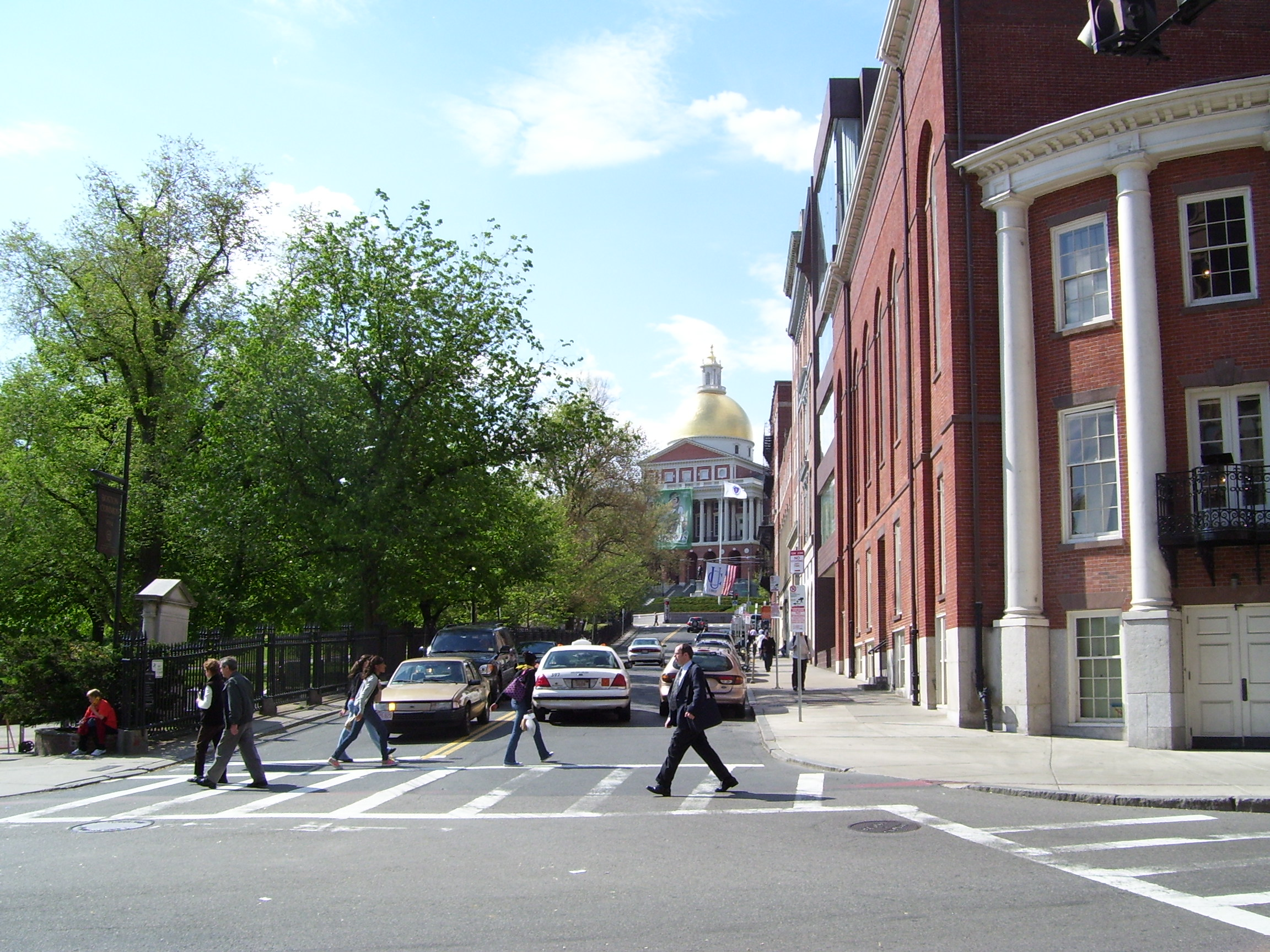
- Park Street, looking toward Massachusetts State House, on Beacon Hill

- Location within Boston Location within Massachusetts Location within the United States
- Location: Boston, Massachusetts, U.S.
- Built: 1795
- Architect: Charles Bulfinch
- Architectural style: Colonial Revival, Greek Revival, Federal
- Website: www.beacon-hill-boston.com
- NRHP reference No.: 66000130

Significant dates
- Added to NRHP: October 15, 1966
- Designated NHLD: December 19, 1962
- Designated BOSL: 1955

Beacon Hill is a historic neighborhood in Boston, Massachusetts, United States. It is also the location of the Massachusetts State House. The term "Beacon Hill" is used locally as a metonym to refer to the state government or the General Court itself, much like Washington, D.C.'s Capitol Hill does at the federal level.

A bastion of "Old Money" Boston Brahmins, Federal-style rowhouses, narrow streets and brick sidewalks run through the neighborhood, which is generally regarded as one of the more desirable and expensive in Boston. As of the 2010 U.S. Census, the population of Boston's Beacon Hill neighborhood was 9,023.

== Etymology ==
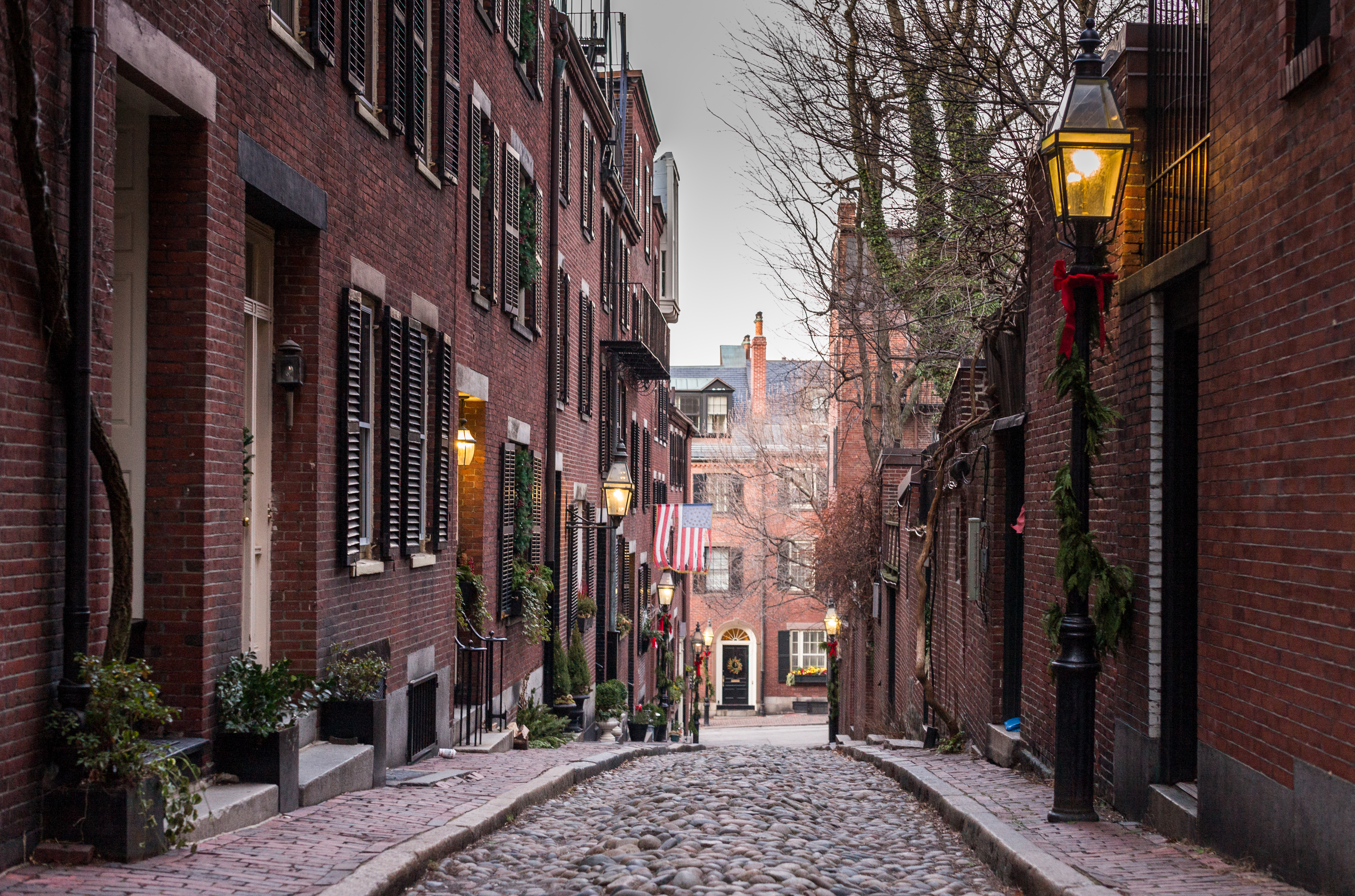
Window boxes on cobblestoned Acorn Street on Beacon Hill

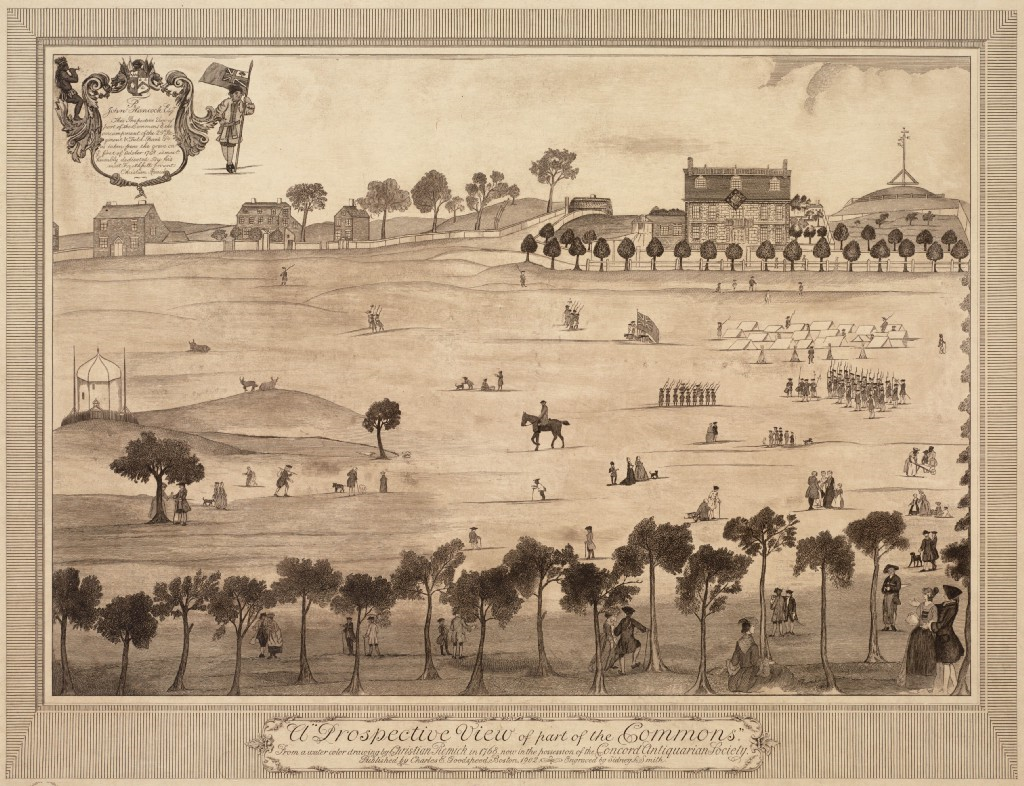
John Hancock's house, located west of Boston Common on Beacon Hill, in 1768

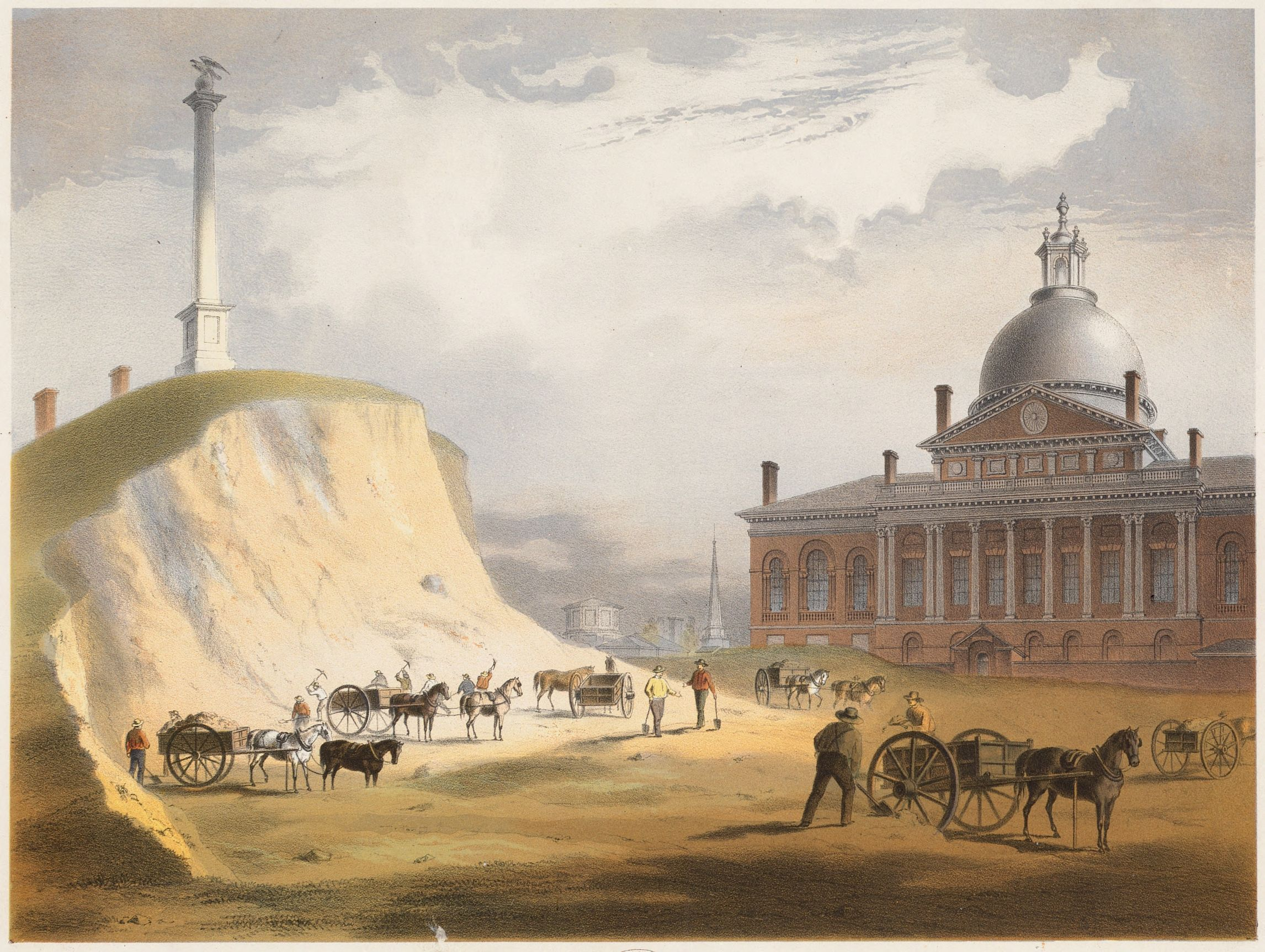
Beacon Hill in 1811, seen from the north toward the Massachusetts State House

Like many similarly named areas, the neighborhood is named for the location of a former beacon atop the highest point in central Boston. The beacon was used to warn the residents of an invasion. (Note: The trimount hills are commonly called Beacon Hill, Mount Vernon and Pemberton Hill. Beacon Hill was also called "Sentry Hill" and Pemberton Hill was called "Cotton Hill." The name trimount later became "Treamount" (as on Lt. Thomas Page's map of 1775) before it morphed into "Tremont", as in contemporary Tremont Street.)

== Geography ==
Beacon Hill is bounded by Storrow Drive, and Cambridge, Bowdoin, Park and Beacon Streets. It is about 1/6 of a square mile in size, and situated along the riverfront of the Charles River Esplanade to the west, just north of Boston Common and the Boston Public Garden. The block bound by Beacon, Tremont and Park Streets is included as well. Beacon Hill has three sections: the south slope, the north slope and the "Flat of the Hill", which is a level neighborhood built on landfill, located west of Charles Street and between Beacon and Cambridge streets.

Located in the center of the Shawmut Peninsula, the area originally had three hills, Beacon Hill and two others nearby, Pemberton Hill and Mount Vernon, which were leveled for Beacon Hill's development. The name trimount later morphed into "Tremont", as in Tremont Street.

Between 1807 and 1832, Beacon Hill was reduced from 138 feet in elevation to 80 feet. The shoreline and bodies of water such as the Mill Pond had a "massive filling", increasing Boston's land mass by 150%. Charles Street was one of the new roads created from the project.

Before the hill was reduced substantially, Beacon Hill was located just behind the current site of Massachusetts State House.

== Demographics ==
According to the 2010 U.S. Census, the population of Boston's Beacon Hill neighborhood is 9,023. This reflects a slight (0.3% or 29 individuals) decrease from the 2000 Census. The racial/ethnic make-up of the neighborhood's population is as follows: 86.8% of the population is white, 2% black or African American, 4.1% Hispanic or Latino, 0.1% American Indian or Alaska Native, 5.3% Asian, 0.4% some other race/ethnicity, and 1.3% two or more races/ethnicities.

According to 2007–2011 American Community Survey estimates, of the 5,411 households in Beacon Hill, 27.3% were family households and 72.7 were non-family households (with 55.7% of those female householders). Of the 1,479 family households 81.6% were married couple families. 36.6% of married couple families were with related children under the age of 18 and 63.4% were with no related children under age 18. Other family types make up 18.4% of Beacon Hill's population, with 90.8% being female householders with no husband present and a majority of these households included children under 18 present.

=== Race ===
Beacon Hill/Financial District (02108) racial breakdown of population (2017)
Race	Percentage of 02108 population	Percentage of Massachusetts population	Percentage of United States population	ZIP code-to-state difference	ZIP code-to-USA difference
White	86.8%	81.3%	76.6%	+5.5%	+10.2%
White (Non-Hispanic)	83.4%	72.1%	60.7%	+11.3%	+22.7%
Black	5.2%	8.8%	13.4%	–3.6%	–8.2%
Hispanic	4.3%	11.9%	18.1%	–7.6%	–13.8%
Asian	4.2%	6.9%	5.8%	–2.7%	–1.6%
Native Americans/Hawaiians	0.6%	0.6%	1.5%	+0.0%	–0.9%
Two or more races	2.4%	2.4%	2.7%	+0.0%	–0.3%

Beacon Hill/West End (02114) racial breakdown of population (2017)
Race	Percentage of 02114 population	Percentage of Massachusetts population	Percentage of United States population	ZIP code-to-state difference	ZIP code-to-USA difference
White	79.2%	81.3%	76.6%	–2.1%	+2.6%
White (Non-Hispanic)	73.6%	72.1%	60.7%	+1.5%	+12.9%
Asian	11.3%	6.9%	5.8%	+4.4%	+5.5%
Hispanic	9.3%	11.9%	18.1%	–2.6%	–8.8%
Black	4.3%	8.8%	13.4%	–4.5%	–9.1%
Native Americans/Hawaiians	0.0%	0.6%	1.5%	–0.6%	–1.5%
Two or more races	2.5%	2.4%	2.7%	+0.1%	–0.2%

=== Ancestry ===
According to the 2012–2016 American Community Survey 5-Year Estimates, the largest ancestry groups in ZIP Codes 02108 and 02114 are:

Ancestry	Percentage of 02108 population	Percentage of Massachusetts population	Percentage of United States population	ZIP code-to-state difference	ZIP code-to-USA difference
Irish	17.51%	21.16%	10.39%	–3.65%	+7.12%
English	15.49%	9.77%	7.67%	+5.71%	+7.95%
Italian	13.34%	13.19%	5.39%	+0.15%	+7.95%
German	8.47%	6.00%	14.40%	+2.47%	–5.93%
Polish	5.78%	4.67%	2.93%	+1.11%	+2.85%
American	5.11%	4.26%	6.89%	+0.85%	–1.78%
French	3.68%	6.82%	2.56%	–3.14%	+1.12%
Norwegian	2.40%	0.51%	1.40%	+1.88%	+1.00%
Northern European	2.35%	0.11%	0.09%	+2.24%	+2.26%
Arab	2.32%	1.10%	0.59%	+1.22%	+1.73%
Chinese	1.93%	2.28%	1.24%	–0.35%	+0.69%
Korean	1.93%	0.37%	0.45%	+1.56%	+1.48%
Lithuanian	1.85%	0.70%	0.20%	+1.15%	+1.65%
Scottish	1.85%	2.28%	1.71%	–0.43%	+0.14%
Dutch	1.58%	0.62%	1.32%	+0.96%	+0.26%
Egyptian	1.53%	0.09%	0.08%	+1.44%	+1.46%
Swedish	1.51%	1.67%	1.23%	–0.16%	+0.28%
Ukrainian	1.46%	0.37%	0.31%	+1.08%	+1.15%
French Canadian	1.38%	3.91%	0.65%	–2.52%	+0.73%
British	1.16%	0.48%	0.43%	+0.68%	+0.73%
Welsh	1.01%	0.36%	0.57%	+0.66%	+0.45%

Ancestry	Percentage of 02114 population	Percentage of Massachusetts population	Percentage of United States population	ZIP code-to-state difference	ZIP code-to-USA difference
Irish	17.58%	21.16%	10.39%	–3.58%	+7.19%
Italian	13.66%	13.19%	5.39%	+0.47%	+8.27%
German	8.81%	6.00%	14.40%	+2.80%	–5.60%
English	8.05%	9.77%	7.67%	–1.73%	+1.57%
Chinese	5.27%	2.28%	1.24%	+2.99%	+4.03%
Polish	4.50%	4.67%	2.93%	–0.17%	+1.57%
Puerto Rican	4.11%	4.52%	1.66%	–0.41%	+2.86%
French	4.10%	6.82%	2.56%	–2.72%	+1.54%
Scottish	3.67%	2.28%	1.71%	+1.39%	+1.96%
American	3.59%	4.26%	6.89%	–0.67%	–3.30%
Russian	2.71%	1.65%	0.88%	+1.06%	+1.83%
Asian Indian	2.48%	1.39%	1.09%	+1.09%	+1.39%
French Canadian	2.18%	3.91%	0.65%	–1.72%	+1.53%
Swedish	2.05%	1.67%	1.23%	+0.39%	+0.83%
Norwegian	1.82%	0.51%	1.40%	+1.31%	+0.42%
European	1.65%	1.08%	1.23%	+0.56%	+0.41%
Arab	1.52%	1.10%	0.59%	+0.42%	+0.92%
Turkish	1.07%	0.11%	0.07%	+0.96%	+1.00%
Greek	1.06%	1.22%	0.40%	–0.16%	+0.66%

== History ==
=== 17th century ===
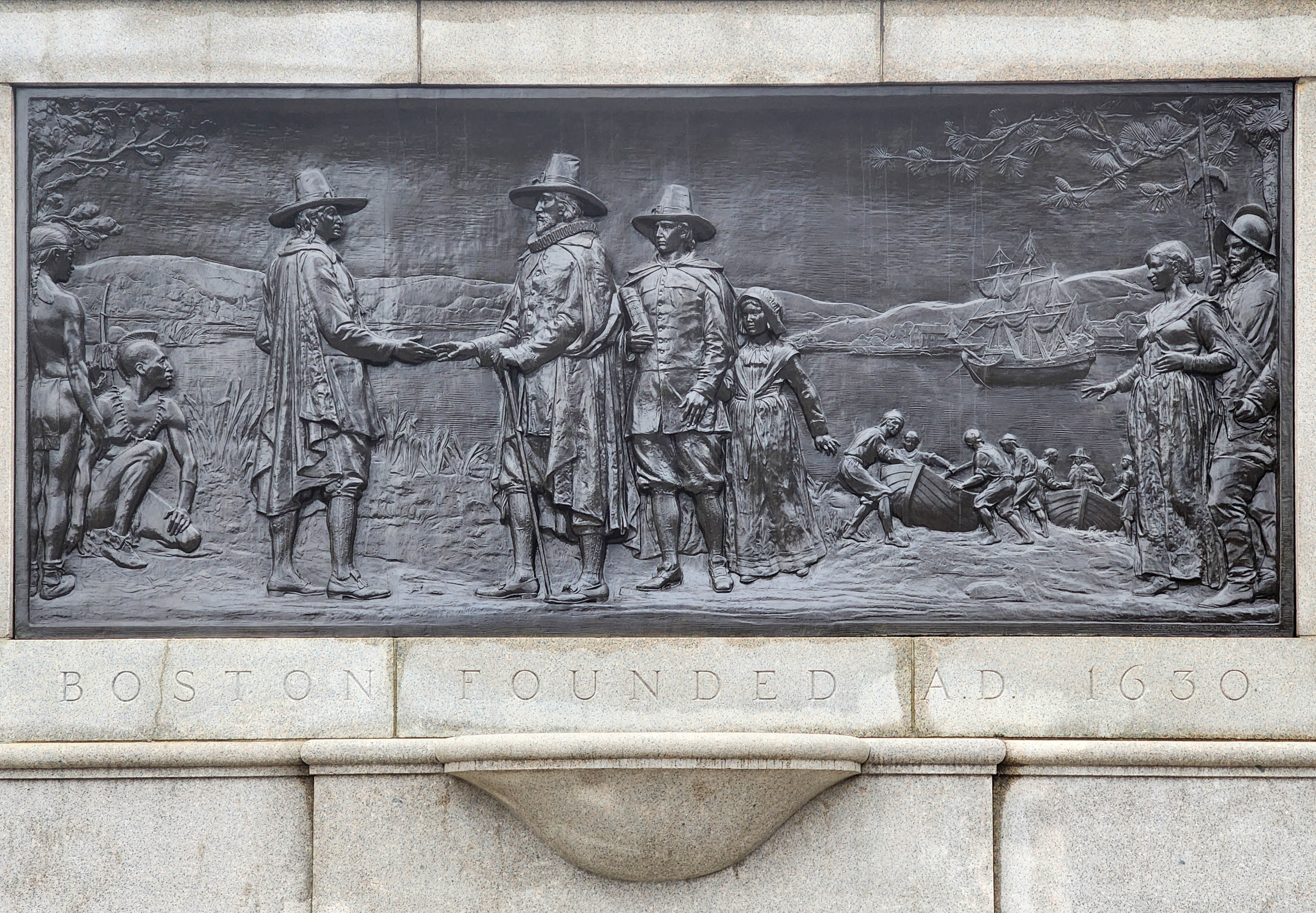
Founders Memorial, John Francis Paramino, 1930. The memorial, located in the Boston Common, depicts the city's first English resident, William Blackstone, greeting colonial governor John Winthrop and his company.

The first European settler was William Blaxton, also spelled Blackstone. In 1625 he built a house and orchard on Beacon Hill's south slope, roughly at the location of Beacon and Spruce street. The settlement was a "preformal arrangement". In 1630 Boston was settled by the Massachusetts Bay Company. The southwestern slope was used by the city for military drills and livestock grazing. In 1634 a signal beacon was established on the top of the hill. Sailors and British soldiers visited the north slope of Beacon Hill during the 17th and 18th centuries. As a result, it became an "undesirable" area for Boston residents. "Fringe activities" occurred on "Mount Whoredom", the backslope of Beacon Hill. (Note: Mount Whoredom was a name assigned by British soldiers. When Beacon Hill was developed, "the seedy nickname vanished along with the undesirable establishments.")

=== 18th century ===
Beacon Street was established in 1708 from a cow path to the Boston Common. John Singleton Copley owned land on the south slope for pasture for his cows and farmland.

In 1787 Charles Bulfinch designed the Massachusetts State House. Its construction was completed in 1798, replacing the Old State House in the center of Boston. The land, formerly belonging to John Hancock, was chosen because it was higher in elevation than the center of town.

The Mount Vernon Proprietors group was formed to develop the trimount area, The name trimount later morphed into "Tremont", as in Tremont Street. when by 1780 the city's neighborhoods could no longer meet the needs of the growing number of residents. (Note: Boston's population doubled between 1775 and 1810. It went from 16,000 to 32,896 residents.) Eighteen and a half or 19 acres of grassland west of the State House was purchased in 1795, most of it from John Singleton Copley. The Beacon Hill district's development began when Charles Bulfinch, an architect and planner, laid out the plan for the neighborhood. Four years later the hills were leveled, Mount Vernon Street was laid, and mansions were built along it. One of the first homes was the Harrison Gray Otis House on Cambridge Street.

=== 19th century ===
==== Development ====
Construction of homes began in earnest at the turn of the century, such as: freestanding mansions, symmetrical pairs of houses, and row houses. (Note: Beacon Hill architects included Solomon Willard, Alexander Parris, Asher Benjamin and Charles Bulfinch. Greek Revival and Federal style homes were built in beginning of the 19th century. Later, additional styles included: Egyptian Revival, Queen Anne, Italianate and American Gothic Revival.) Between 1803 and 1805, the first row houses were built for Stephen Higginson. (Note: The architecture was described as: Highstyle Federal brick townhouses, two and three stories tall with elliptical porticoes, pilasters and balustrades, the most ambitious of them free standing and Bulfinch-designed, were built along the crest of Beacon Hill and on Cambridge Street. Other imposing brick rowhouses were constructed around the Common. Substantial but less pretentious middle-class housing, three story, brick sidehall Federal rowhouses with side and fanlit entrances, filled in the lower slopes of Beacon Hill and the South End along Washington Street while modest sidehall brick houses, three stories tall, were built in the working class neighborhoods of the North End, the north slope of Beacon Hill and the West End.)

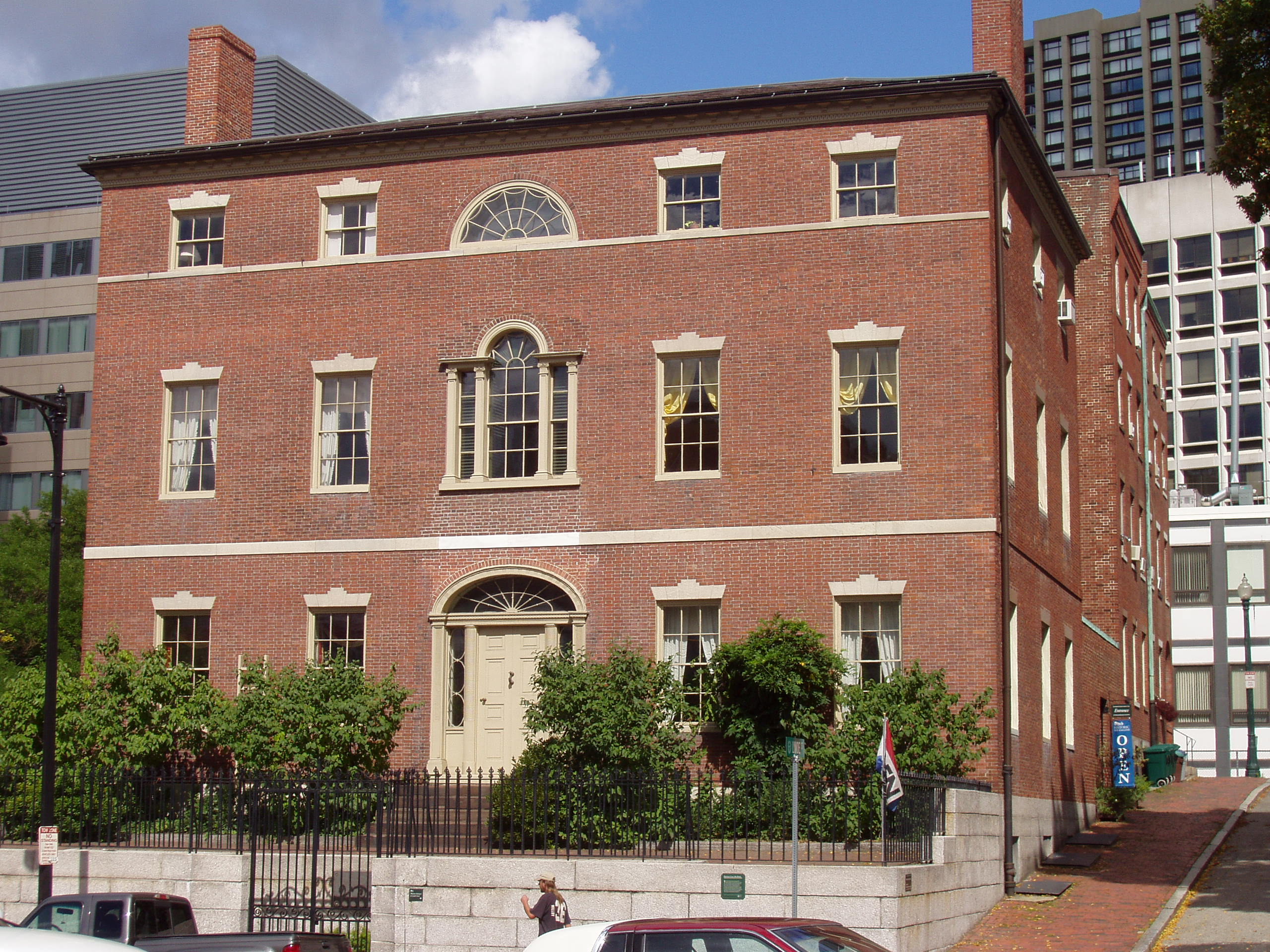
Harrison Gray Otis House, mansion, on Cambridge Street

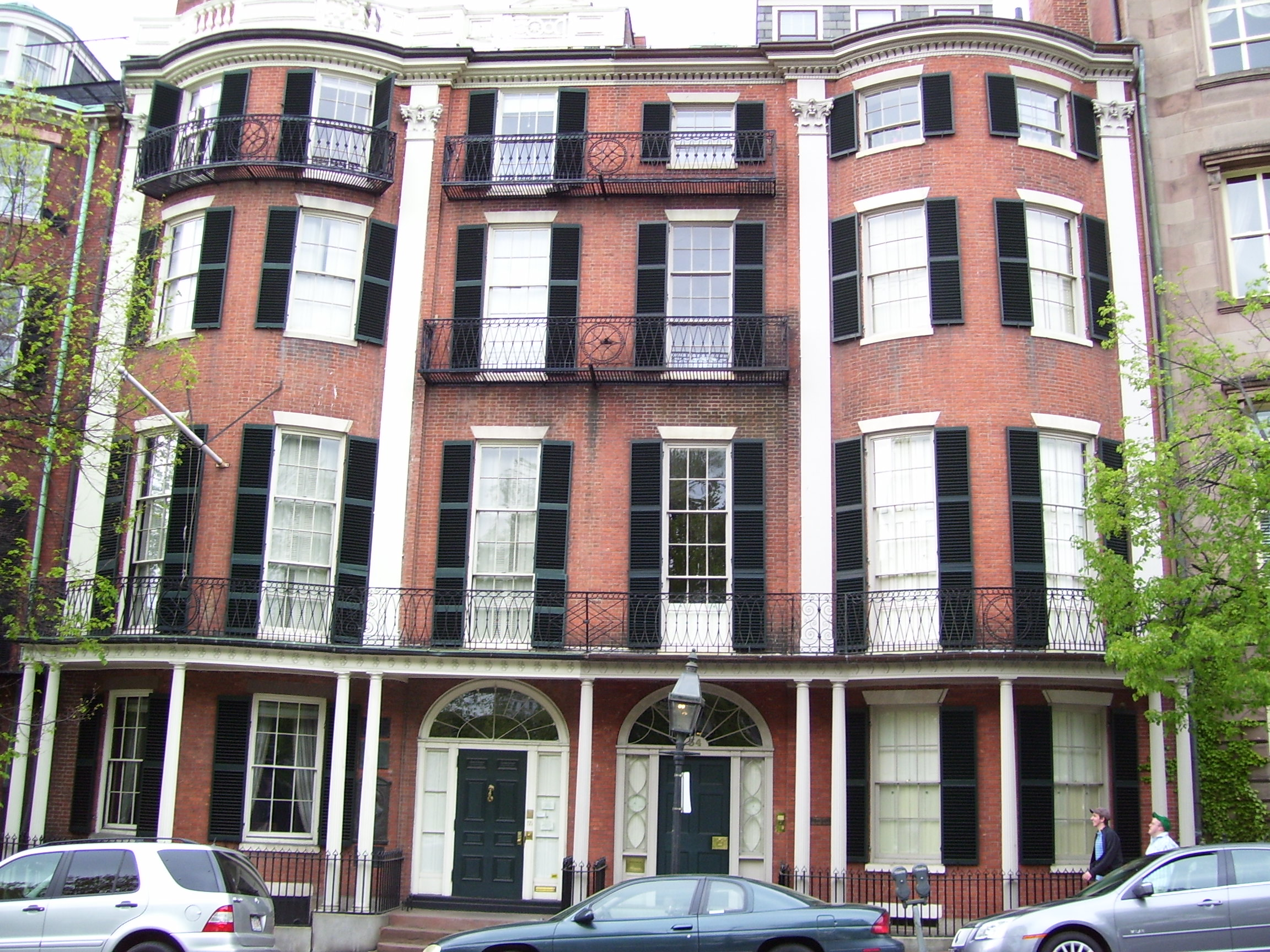
Pair of houses, 54–55 Beacon Street. House on left is known as William H. Prescott House and as Headquarters House.

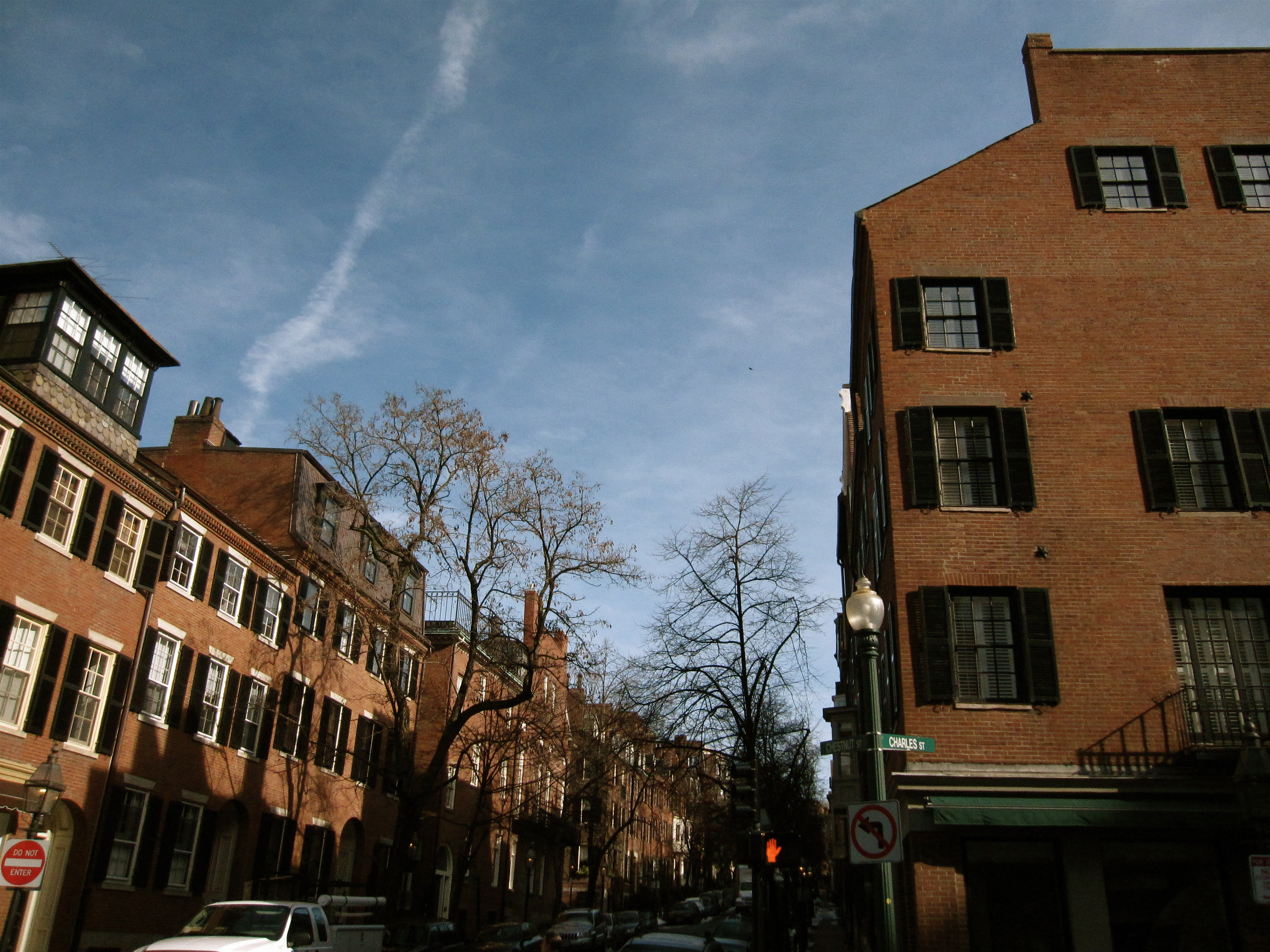
Chestnut Street, row houses, 2010

In the 1830s, residential homes were built for wealthy people on Chestnut and Mt. Vernon Streets. Some affluent people moved, beginning in the 1870s, to Back Bay with its "French-inspired boulevards and mansard-roofed houses that were larger, lighter, and airier than the denser Beacon Hill."

In the early 19th century, there were "fringe activities" along the Back Bay waterfront, with ropewalks along Beacon and Charles Streets.

==== South slope ====
The south slope "became the seat of Boston wealth and power." It was carefully planned for people who left densely populated areas, like the North End. The residents of opulent homes, called the Boston Brahmins, were described by Oliver Wendell Holmes as a "harmless, inoffensive, untitled aristocracy". They had "houses by Charles Bulfinch, their monopoly on Beacon Street, their ancestral portraits and Chinese porcelains, humanitarianism, Unitarian faith in the march of the mind, Yankee shrewdness, and New England exclusiveness."

Literary salons and publishing houses were founded in the 19th century. "Great thinkers" lived in the neighborhood, including Daniel Webster, Henry Thoreau and Wendell Phillips.

==== Flat of the Hill ====
Development began in the early 19th century. Single family homes often had stores on the first floor for retailers, carpenters and shoemakers. Today, many of the 19th century waterfront landmarks, such as the Charles Street Meeting House, are found far from the water due to the filling that has taken place since then.

===== North slope =====
The north slope was the home of African Americans, sailors and Eastern and Southern European immigrants. The area around Belknap Street (now Joy Street) in particular became home to more than 1,000 blacks beginning in the mid-1700s. While this community is often described as arising from domestic workers in the homes of white residents on the south slope of the Hill, property records indicate that the black community on the north slope was already well-established by 1805, before the filling-in of the south slope was completed, and so before that slope of Beacon Hill came to be considered an affluent area.

Many blacks in the neighborhood attended church with the whites but did not have a vote in church affairs and sat in segregated seating. A Baptist congregation, built the African Meeting House in 1806 and by 1840 there were five black churches. The African Meeting House on Joy Street was a community center for members of the black elite. Frederick Douglass spoke there about abolition, and William Lloyd Garrison formed the New England Anti-Slavery Society at the Meeting House. It became a "hotbed and an important depot on the Underground Railroad."

Blacks and whites were largely united on the subject of abolition. Beacon Hill was one of the staunchest centers of the anti-slavery movement in the Antebellum era.

One of the earliest black Republican legislators in the United States was Julius Caesar Chappelle (1852–1904), who served as a legislator in Boston from 1883 to 1886 and whose district included the Beacon Hill area. Chappelle was a popular, well-liked politician and was covered by many of the black newspapers in the United States.

Blacks migrated to Roxbury and Boston's South End after the Civil War.

===== Immigrants =====
In the latter part of the 19th century, Beacon Hill absorbed an influx of Irish, Jewish and other immigrants.

Many homes built of brick and wood in the early 19th century were dilapidated by the end of the Civil War and were razed for new housing. Brick apartment buildings, or tenements, were built. Yellow brick townhouses were constructed, generally with arched windows on the first floor and a low ceiling on the top, fourth floor. Residential homes were also converted to boarding houses.

The north slope neighborhood transitioned as blacks moved out of the neighborhood and immigrants, such as Eastern European Jews, made their homes in the community. The Vilna Shul was established in 1898, and the African Meeting House was converted into a synagogue.

=== 20th century ===
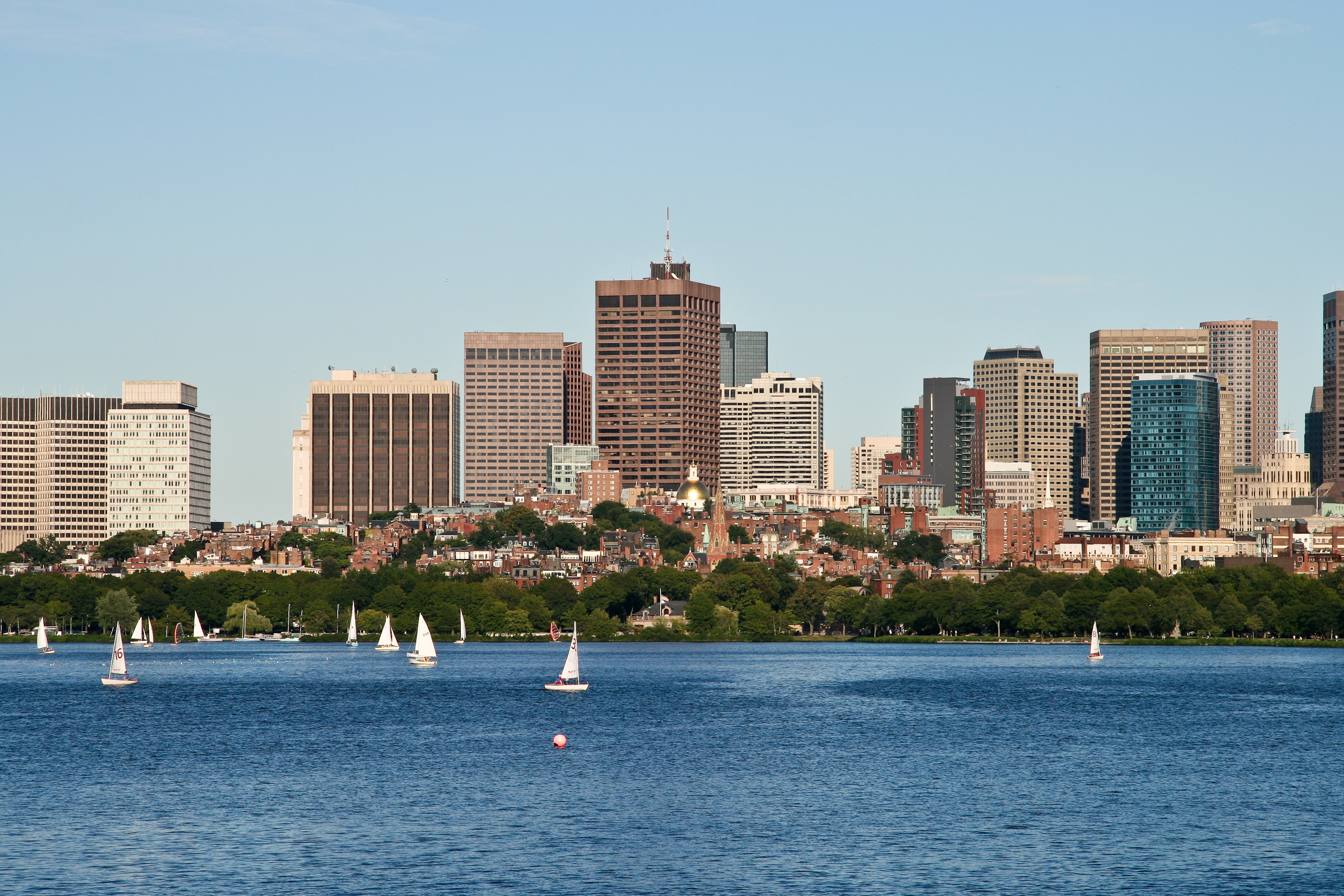
The neighborhood of Beacon Hill as seen from the Charles River (with the Financial District in the background)

Better transportation service to the suburbs and other cities led a boom to the city's economy at the beginning of the 20th century. New buildings, "compatible with the surroundings", were built and older buildings renovated. To ensure that there were controls on new development and demolition, the Beacon Hill Association was formed in 1922. Into the 1940s there were attempts to replace brick sidewalks, but the projects were abandoned due to community resistance.

Banks, restaurants and other service industries moved into the "Flat of the Hill", with a resulting transformation of the neighborhood.

Red-light districts operated near Beacon Hill in Scollay Square and the West End until a 1950s urban renewal project renovated the area. To prevent urban renewal projects of historically significant buildings in Beacon Hill, its residents ensured that the community obtained historic district status: south slope in 1955, Flat of the Hill in 1958, and north slope in 1963. The Beacon Hill Architectural Commission was established in 1955 to monitor renovation and development projects. For instance, in 1963, 70–72 Mount Vernon Street was to be demolished for the construction of an apartment building. A compromise was made to maintain the building and its exterior and build new apartments inside.

==== Historic district and national landmark ====
In 1955, state legislation Chapter 616 created the Historic Beacon Hill District. It was the first such district in Massachusetts, created to protect historic sites and manage urban renewal. Supporting these objectives is the local non-profit Beacon Hill Civic Association. According to the Massachusetts Historical Commission, the historic districts "appear to have stabilized architectural fabric" of Beacon Hill.

Beacon Hill was designated a National Historic Landmark on December 19, 1962.

=== 21st century ===
Wealthy Boston families continue to live at the Flat of the Hill and south slope. Inhabitants of the north slope include Suffolk University students and professionals.

== Sites of interest ==
=== Black Heritage Trail ===
The Boston African American National Historic Site is located just north of Boston Common. The historic buildings along today's Black Heritage Trail were the homes, businesses, schools and churches of the black community. Charles Street Meeting House was built in 1807, the church had seating that segregated white and black people. The Museum of African American History, New England's largest museum dedicated to African American history, is located at the African Meeting House, adjacent to the Abiel Smith School. The meeting house is the oldest surviving Black church built by African Americans. The Robert Gould Shaw Memorial and the 54th Massachusetts Regiment Memorial are located at Beacon Street and Park Street, opposite the Massachusetts State House.

=== Massachusetts State House ===
The Massachusetts State House, located on Beacon Street, is the home of the Commonwealth's government. The gold-domed state capitol building was designed by Charles Bulfinch and was completed in 1798. Many of the country's state capitol buildings were modeled after the State House.

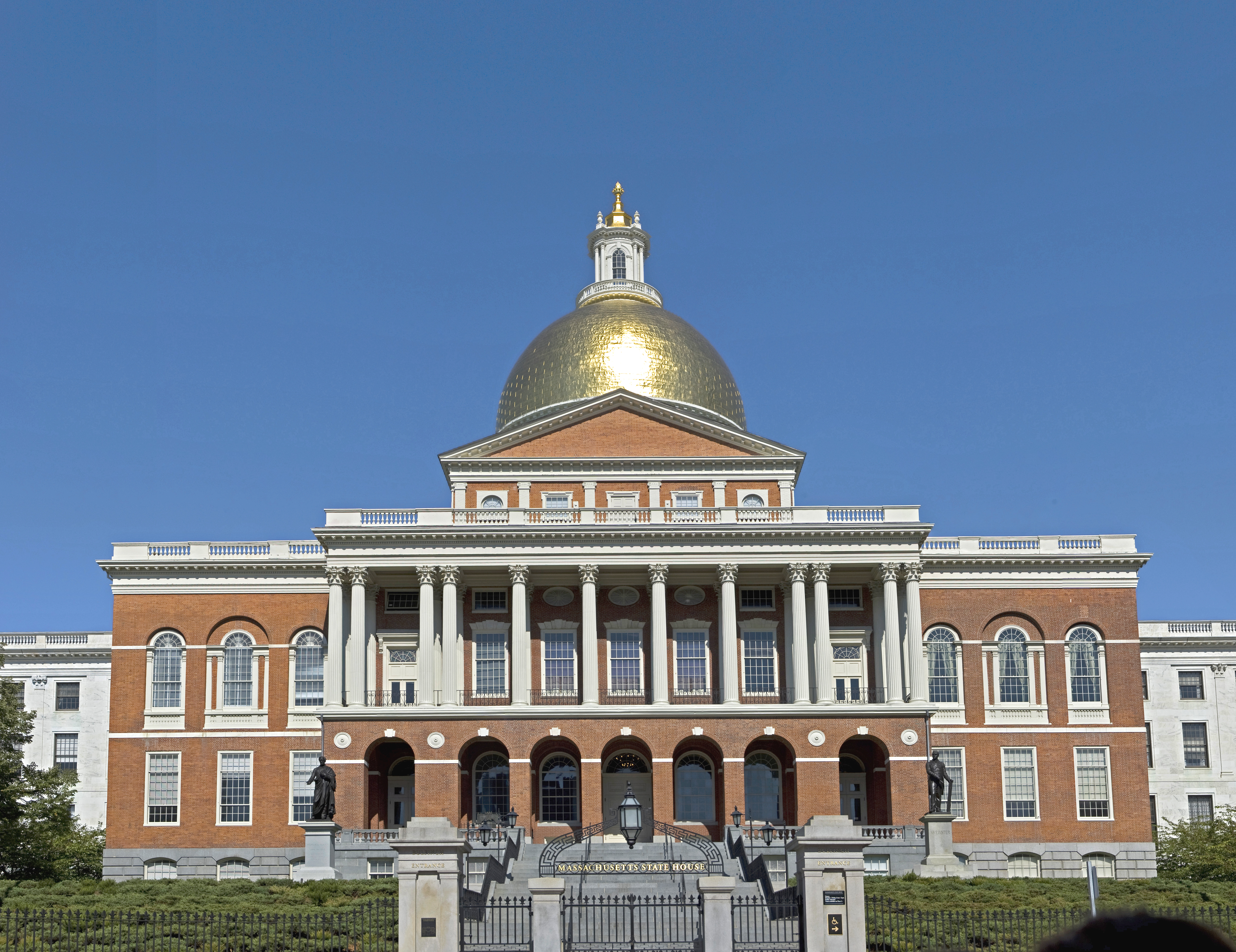
Massachusetts State House

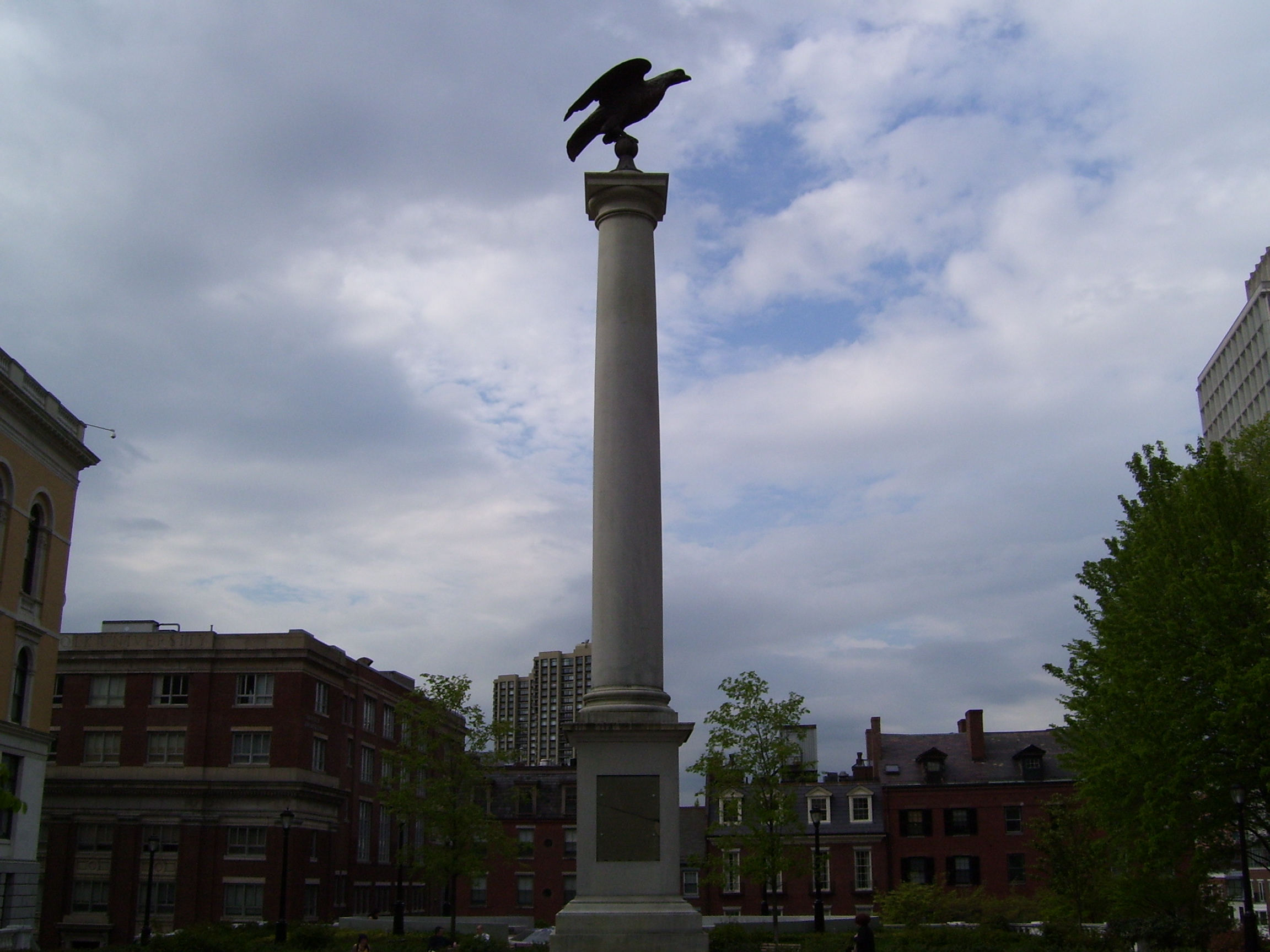
Beacon Hill Monument in back of the State House marking the site of the original beacon pole

=== Organizations ===
==== Community ====
The Beacon Hill Civic Association has a long history as a community resource for the Beacon Hill neighborhood. Founded in 1922 by neighbors with the goal of preventing home building and other construction, today it continues as a volunteer advocacy organization focused on improving quality of life in the neighborhood. It was first founded to fight city plans to replace the neighborhood's brick sidewalks. Since then its efforts have been instrumental in preserving Beacon Hill as a historic district, and have expanded to include such initiatives as: working to become the first neighborhood to receive resident parking permits, streamlining trash service, and creating a virtual retirement community serving the neighborhood's elderly.

==== Non-religious ====
The Club of Odd Volumes, a historic organization on Mount Vernon Street, serves as a Bibliophiles club, library, and archive. The Headquarters House, also known as William Hickling Prescott House, is a museum run by the Society of Colonial Dames. The country's oldest legal organization, the Boston Bar Association, is on Beacon Street. Beacon Hill Village was the first formal Elder Village in the United States.

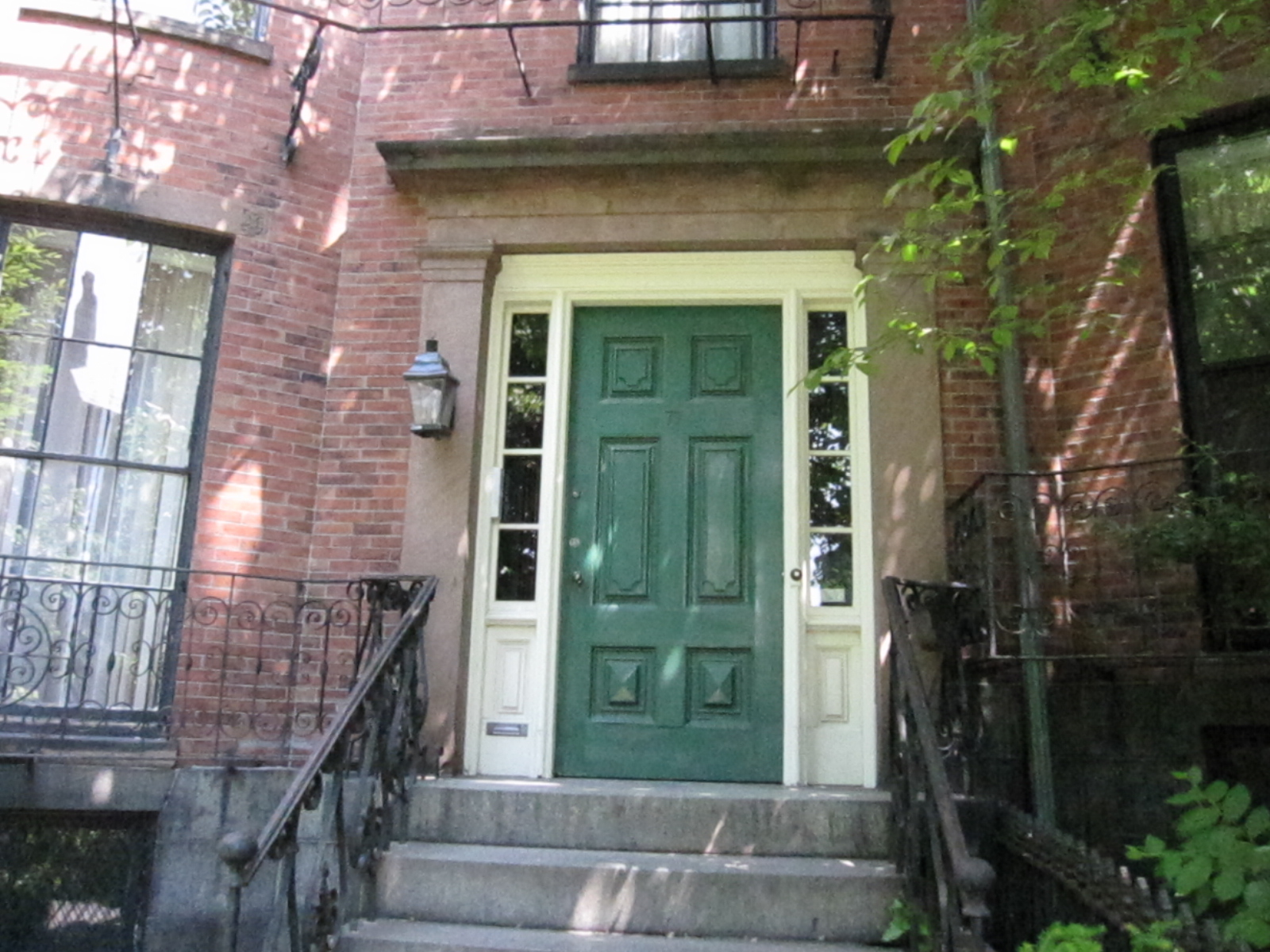
The Club of Odd Volumes, 77 Mt. Vernon Street

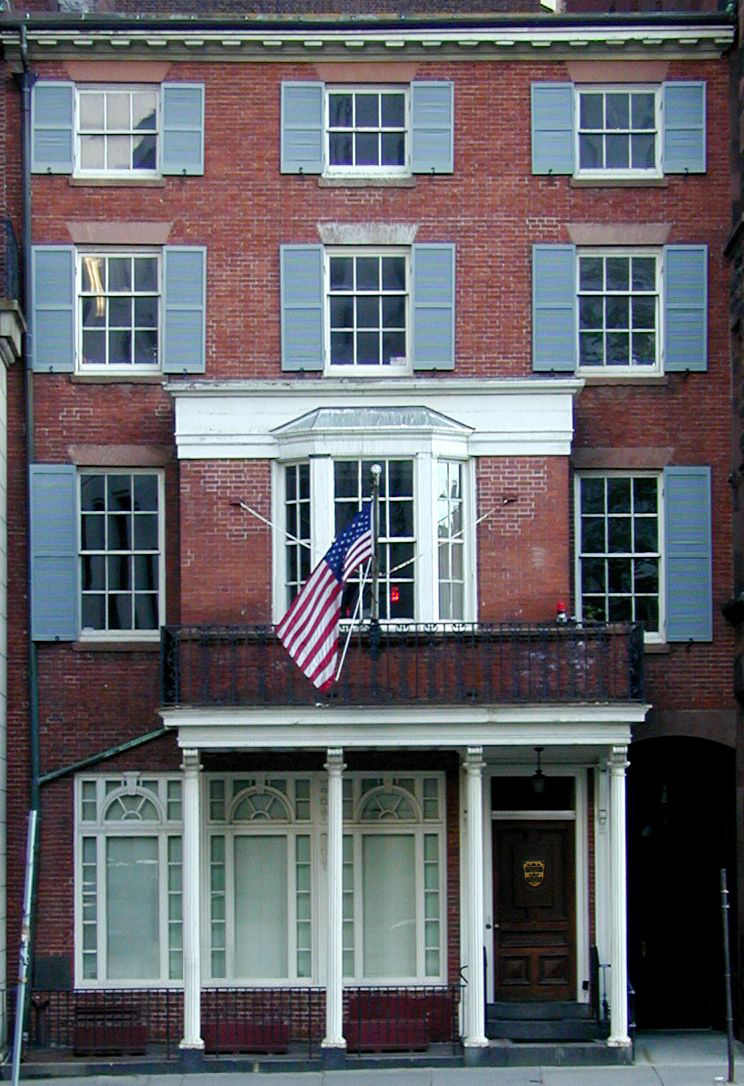
The Chester Harding House, a National Historic Landmark occupied by portrait painter Chester Harding from 1826 to 1830, now houses the Boston Bar Association.

==== Religious ====
Religious organizations include the Vilna Shul, an Orthodox Jewish synagogue. The headquarters for the Unitarian Universalist Association was formerly in the neighborhood at 25 Beacon Street, but moved to the Seaport District in 2013. Church of the Advent is a Victorian Gothic Church, faced in brick with 8 massive change ringing bells and a 172-foot spire. The Park Street Church, nicknamed "Brimstone Corner" in the 19th century, was used to store gunpowder during the War of 1812. Samuel Francis Smith first sang his song America the Beautiful at this church in 1831. Two years earlier William Lloyd Garrison spoke to the congregation about abolishing slavery. One of the few outposts of the small Protestant group the Swedenborgian Church is on Bowdoin Street, and was embroiled in controversy in 2013 over alleged extortion by a former mafioso. While home to a Paulist chapel, Beacon Hill is currently one of only two neighborhoods in Boston that does not contain a Catholic parish church.

=== Neighborhoods ===
Beacon Hill is predominantly residential, known for old colonial brick row houses with "beautiful doors, decorative iron work, brick sidewalks, narrow streets, and gas lamps". Restaurants and antique shops are located on Charles Street.

Louisburg Square is "the most prestigious address" in Beacon Hill. Its residents have access to private parking and live in "magnificent Greek Revival townhouses." Nearby is Acorn Street, often mentioned as the "most frequently photographed street in the United States." It is a narrow lane paved with cobblestones that was home to coachmen employed by families in Mt. Vernon and Chestnut Street mansions.

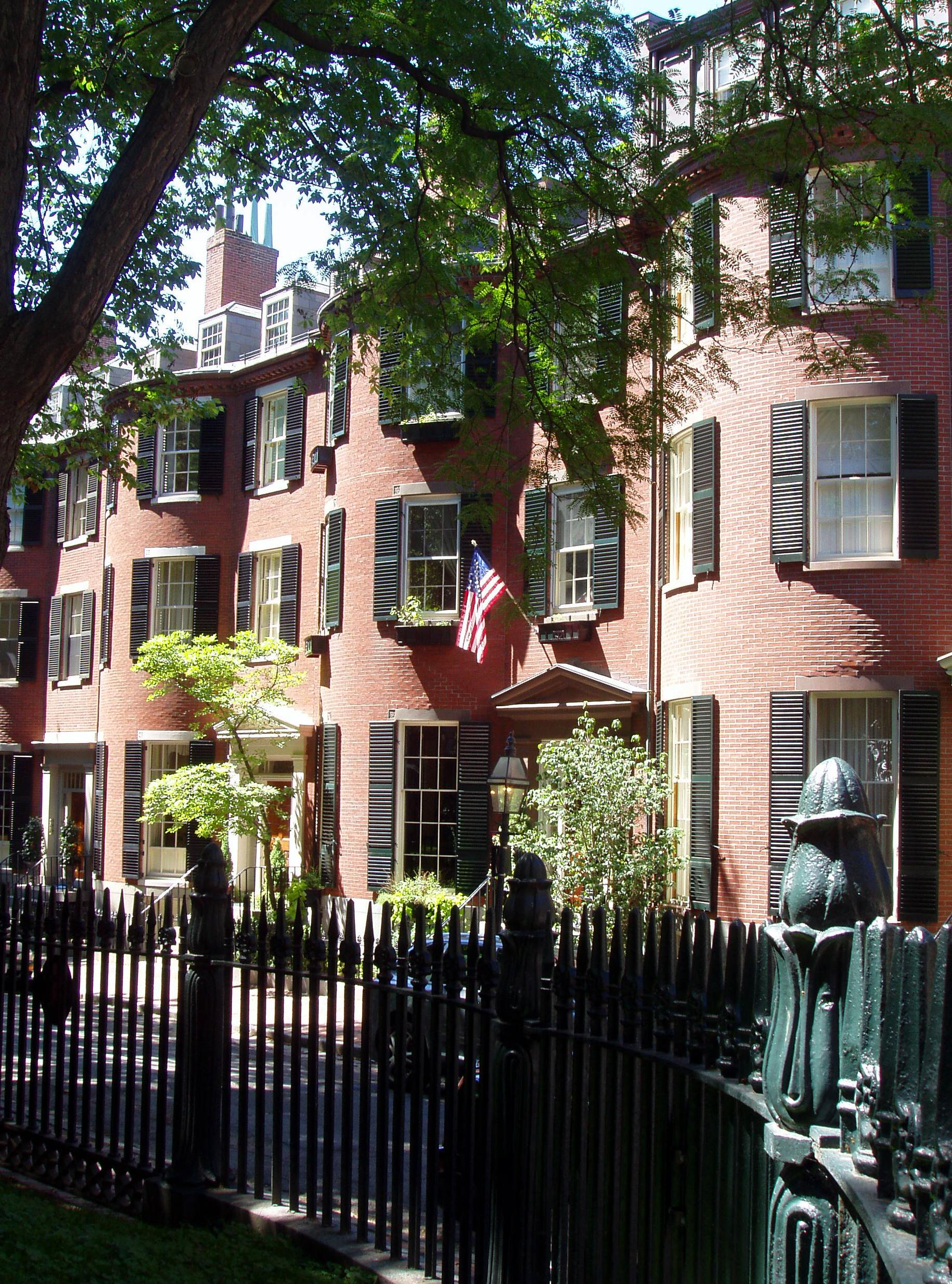
Houses on Louisburg Square

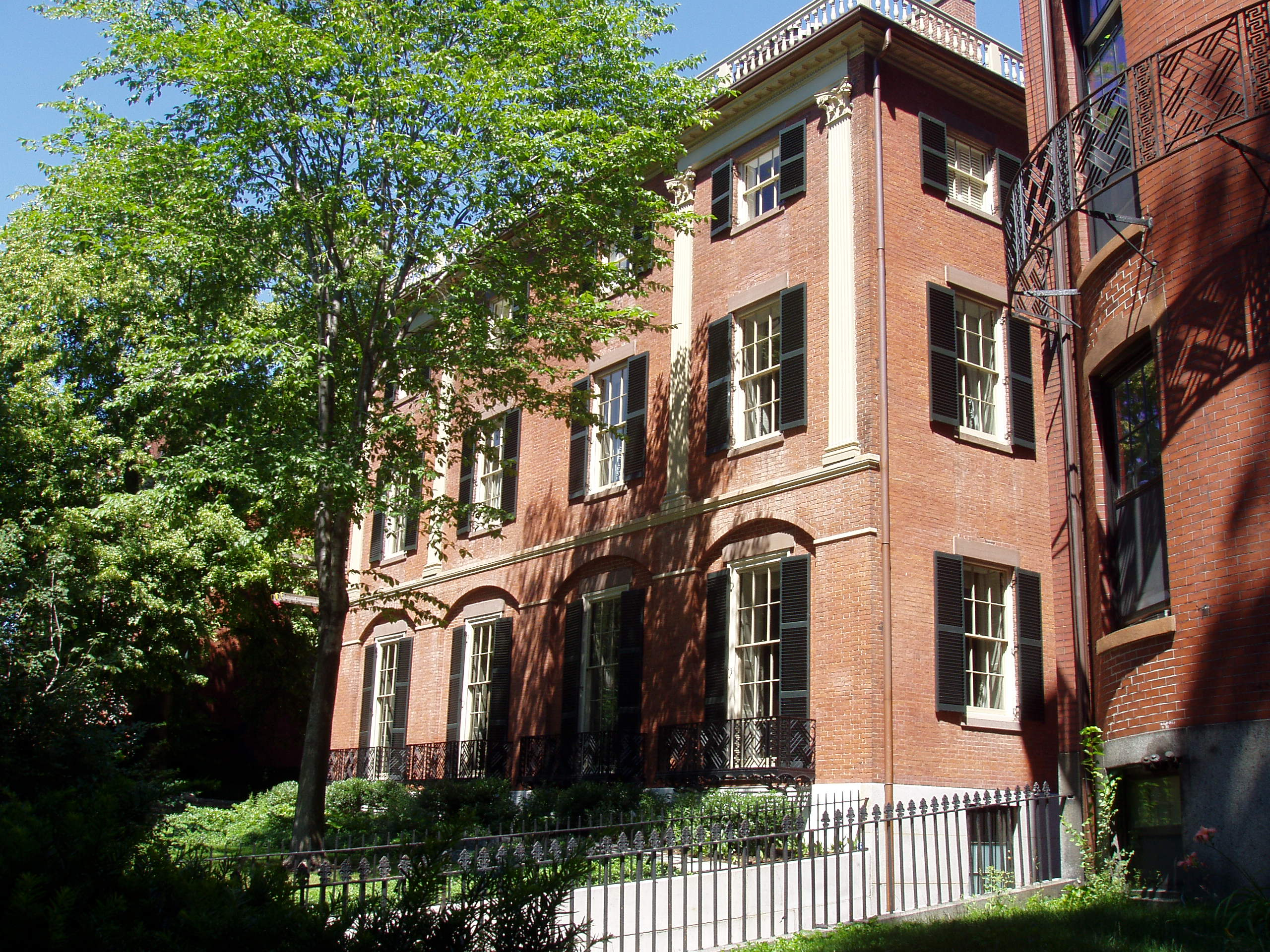
Second Harrison Gray Otis House, 85 Mount Vernon Street

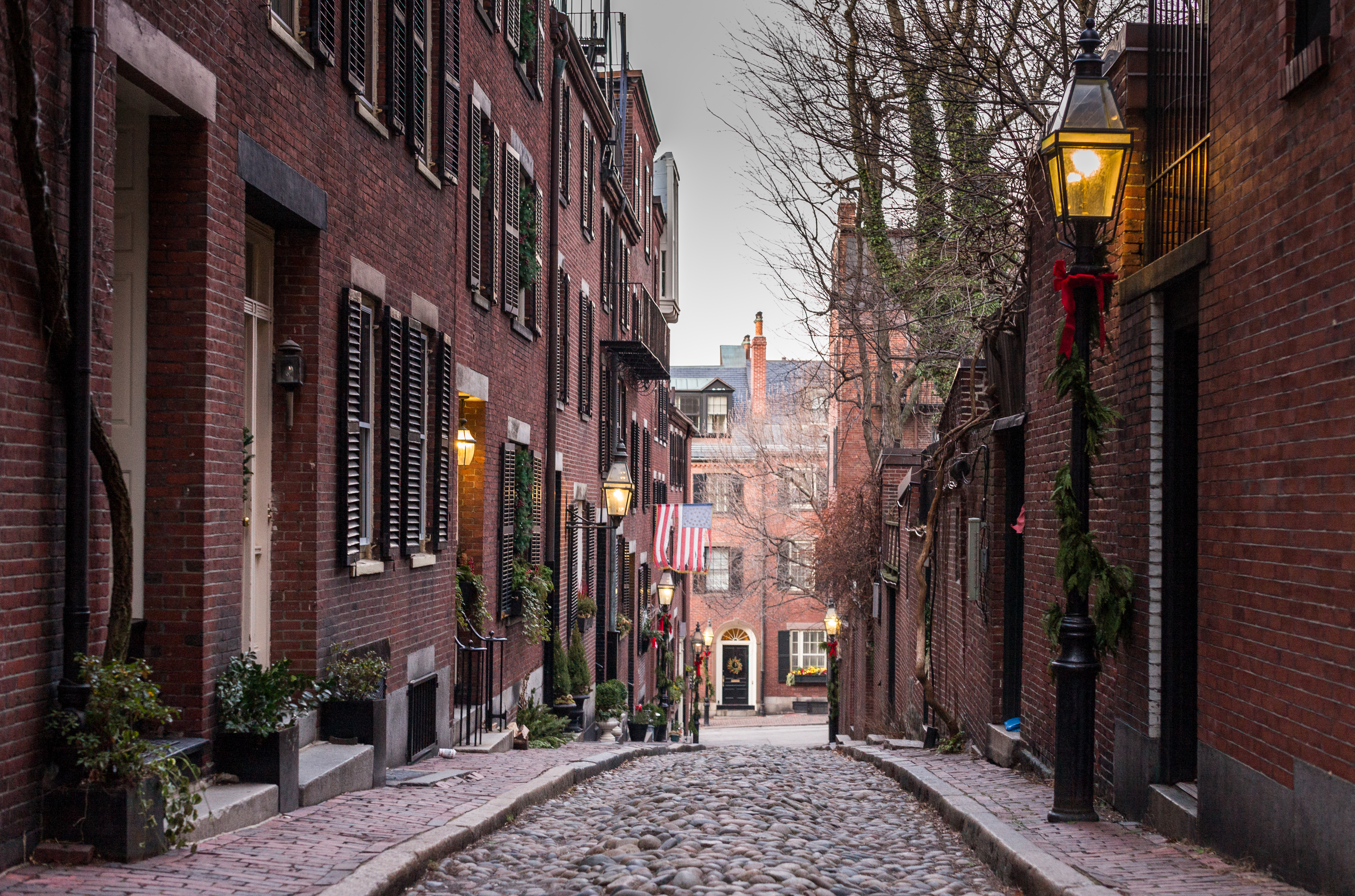
Acorn Street

The Harrison Gray Otis House on Cambridge Street was built in 1796. Charles Bulfinch designed this house, and two additional houses, for the businessman and politician who was instrumental in Beacon Hill's development and Boston becoming the state capital. The Otis House also houses the headquarters of Historic New England, previously known as Society for the Preservation of New England Antiquities. Other notable houses are the Francis Parkman House and an 1804 townhouse, now the Nichols House Museum. The Nichols House "offers a rare glimpse inside [the] Brahmin life" of Rose Standish Nichols, a landscape artists.

=== Suffolk University ===
Suffolk University and its Law School are adjacent to the Massachusetts State House and the Massachusetts Supreme Judicial Court. The Suffolk University Law School was founded in 1906.

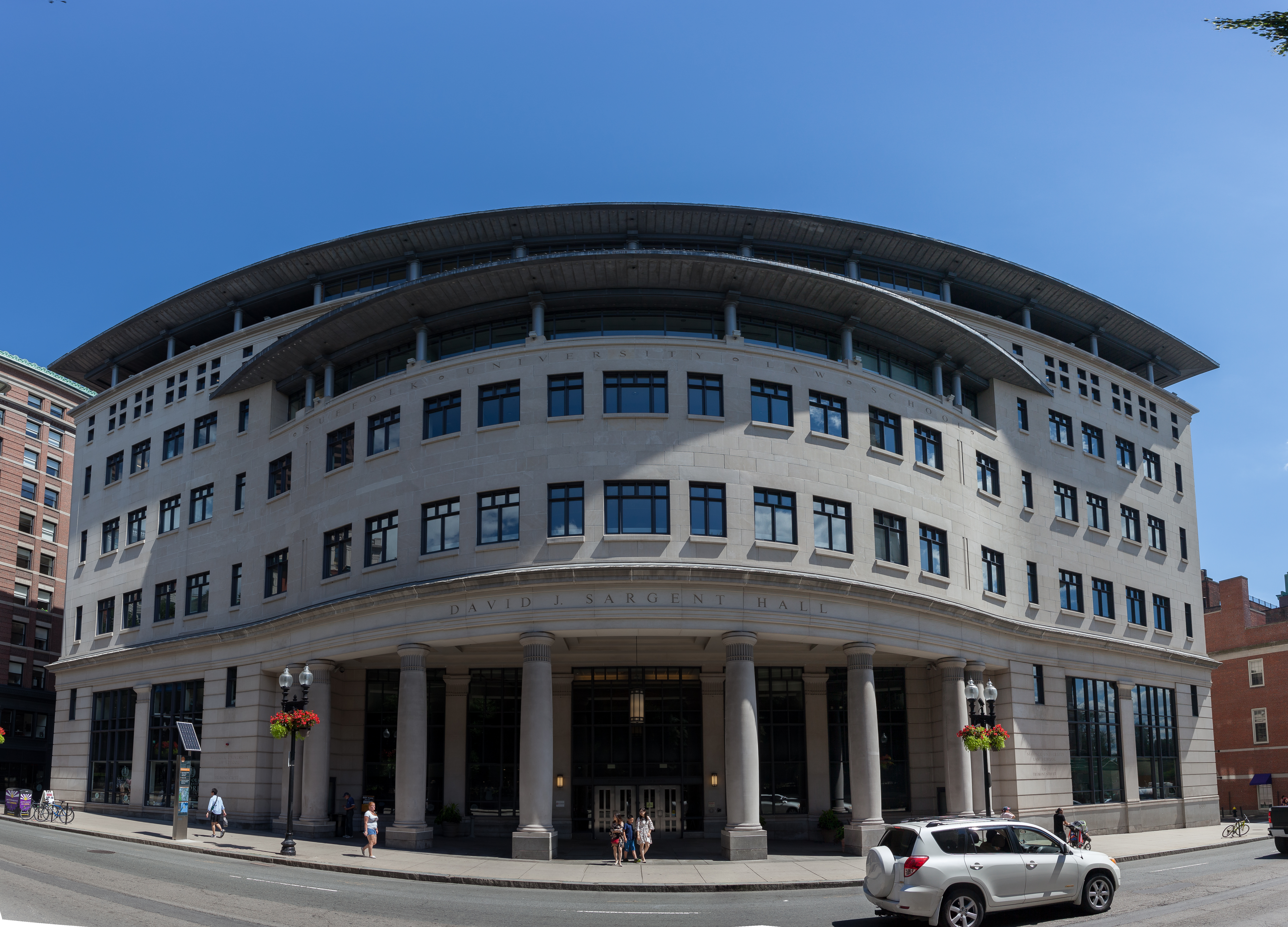
Sargent Hall, Suffolk University

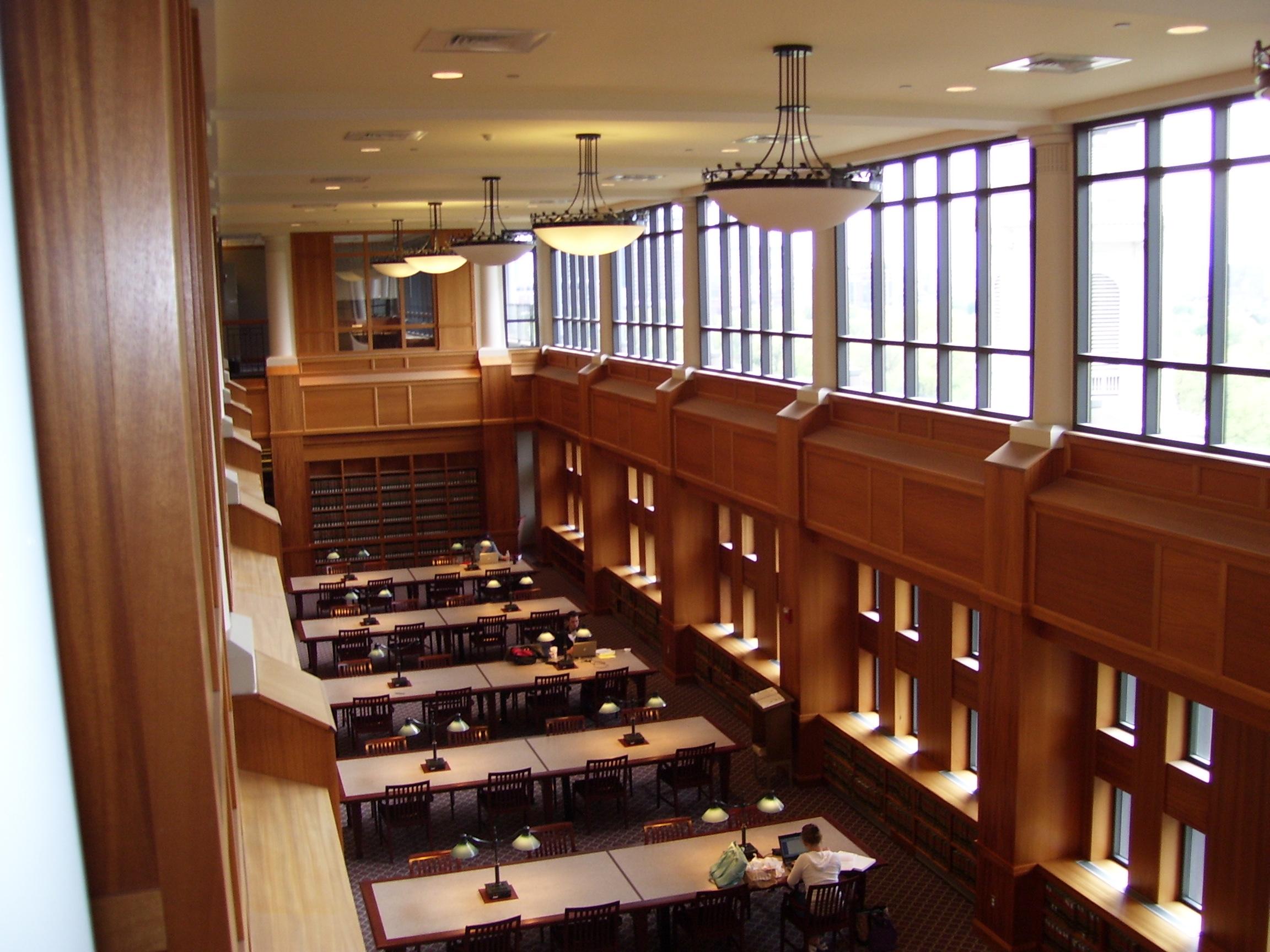
Law Library reading room, Suffolk University Law School

== Transportation ==
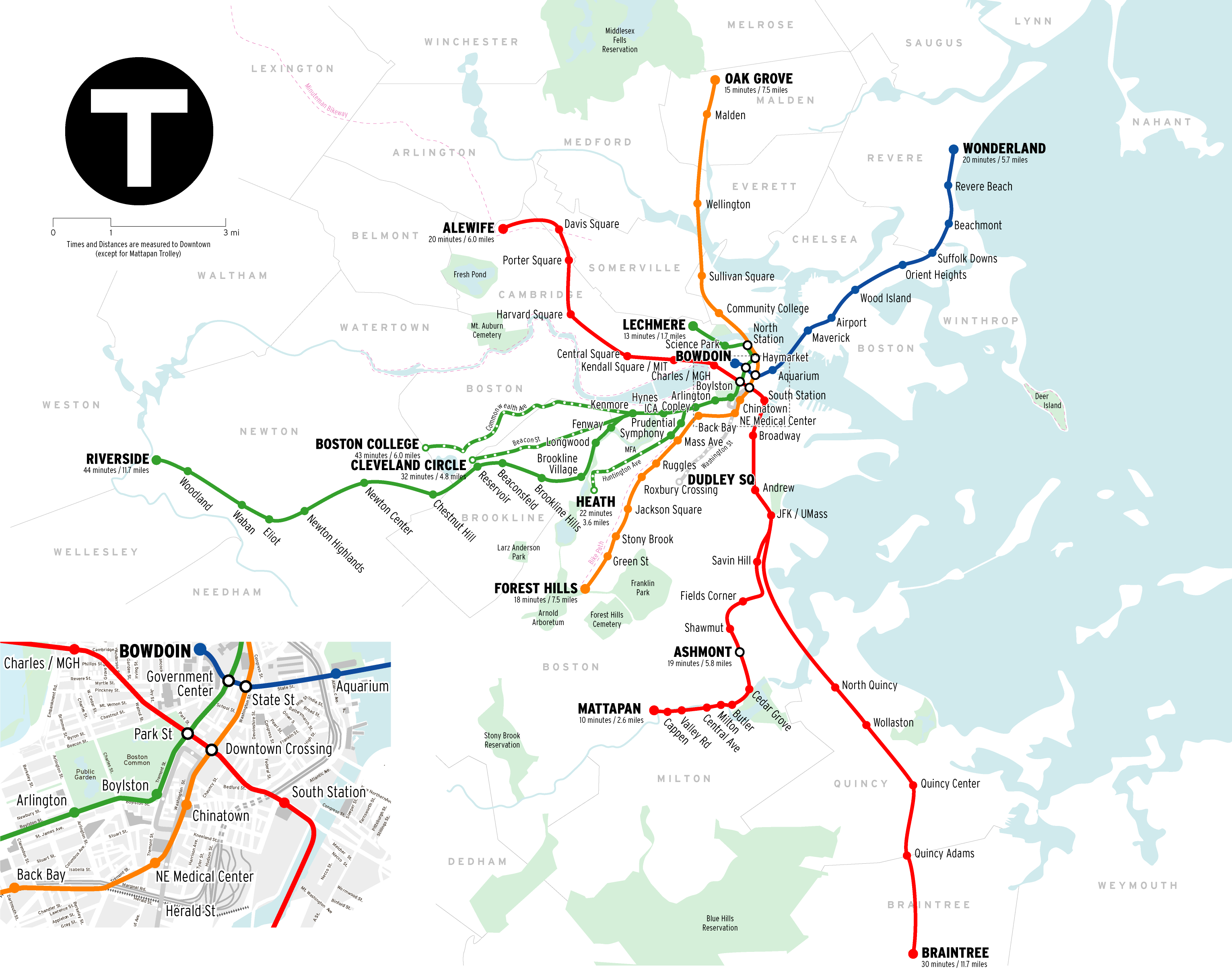
MBTA subway map; Beacon Hill is in the center.

Massachusetts Bay Transportation Authority (MBTA) subway stations in Beacon Hill are:

- Park Street – Red and Green Lines
- Bowdoin – Blue Line
- Charles/MGH – Red Line

MBTA bus, MBTA commuter rail, and ferry services are also available.

== Notable people ==
Beacon Hill has been home to many notable persons, including:

- Mildred Albert
- Louisa May Alcott, author of Little Women
- John Albion Andrew
- William Blaxton, original owner of Beacon Hill
- Edwin Booth, actor; brother of John Wilkes Booth
- Peter Bent Brigham
- Charles Bulfinch
- John Cheever, author
- Ednah Dow Littlehale Cheney
- John Singleton Copley
- Michael Crichton, author
- Robert Frost, poet
- James Gibson (Captain)
- Janet Doub Erickson
- John Hancock
- Chester Harding
- Teresa Heinz
- Oliver Wendell Holmes Sr.
- Oliver Wendell Holmes Jr.
- Julia Ward Howe
- Abigail Johnson
- Edward M. Kennedy
- John Kerry
- Henry Cabot Lodge
- James Russell Lowell
- Robert Lowell
- Mary Osgood
- Harrison Gray Otis
- Sylvia Plath
- William Prescott
- Eleanor Raymond
- C. Allen Thorndike Rice
- Henry Rice
- David Lee Roth
- George Santayana
- Anne Sexton
- Robert Gould Shaw
- Carly Simon, singer-songwriter
- Samuel Snowden
- Charles Sumner
- Uma Thurman, actress
- David Walker
- Gretchen Osgood Warren
- Fiske Warren
- Daniel Webster
- Jack Welch

== In popular culture ==
- Published in 1937, the Pulitzer-Prize-winning novel The Late George Apley by John Phillips Marquand satirizes the upper-class white residents of Beacon Hill.
- William Kane, one of the protagonists in the Jeffrey Archer novel Kane and Abel, lives in Beacon Hill.
- On Beacon Street, the Bull and Finch Bar was the inspiration and source of exterior shots for the Cheers television show.
- Make Way for Ducklings (Viking, 1941) is a children's picture book written and illustrated by Robert McCloskey. Most of the story is set at the foot of Beacon Hill, especially the route taken by the fictional Mrs. Mallard and her children on foot across Beacon Street. It is commemorated every year in May by a parade through Beacon Hill to the Boston Public Garden, where the mallards nested.
- Nine Lives; or, the celebrated cat of Beacon Hill (Pantheon, 1951) is a 62-page children's book by the novelist Edward Fenton (1917–1995) and illustrator Paul Galdone. "A wealthy, elderly Boston matron adopts a scruffy tomcat and while she is away on a trip her jealous butler tries very hard to destroy all nine of the cat's lives."
- The 1968 Norman Jewison film The Thomas Crown Affair is set and was largely filmed in and around Beacon Hill.
- Dr. Charles Emerson Winchester was born and raised there, and in an episode of MASH [9/13 "No Laughing Matter"] swears "By Beacon Hill" to get revenge on the commanding officer who sent him to MASH 4077.
- Robert Lowell's prose sketch 91 Revere Street was inspired by his childhood home on Beacon Hill.
- Dr. Michaela Quinn of Dr. Quinn, Medicine Woman was raised on Beacon Hill.
- Dr. Maura Isles of TNT's Rizzoli & Isles lives on Beacon Hill.
- Asclepia, a small private hospital, is mentioned in Patrick O'Brian's sixth Aubrey-Maturin novel, The Fortune of War, as being "in a dry, healthy location near Beacon Hill."
- The NBC TV series Banacek (1972–1974) was set and partially filmed on Beacon Hill. Its main character "Thomas Banacek" played by George Peppard grew up in nearby "Scollay Square" and lived in the "Second Harrison Grey Otis House."

== See also ==
- National Register of Historic Places listings in northern Boston, Massachusetts
- List of National Historic Landmarks in Boston
- List of notable addresses in Beacon Hill, Boston

== Notes and references ==
=== Sources ===
- "Area Preservation and the Beacon Hill Bill" (PDF). Old-Time New England. 46 (164). Spring 1956. Archived from the original (PDF) on October 31, 2020.
- Moying Li-Marcus (October 17, 2002). Beacon Hill: The Life & Times of a Neighborhood. Northeastern University Press. ISBN 978-1-55553-543-8.
- A. McVoy McIntyre (1975). Beacon Hill: A Walking Tour. Little, Brown. ISBN 978-0-316-55600-2.
- Robert Shackleton (June 1, 2008). The Book of Boston. Kessinger Publishing. ISBN 978-1-4366-5685-6. Online version: Book of Boston
