= Vilna Shul =

Historic landmark synagogue in Boston

The Vilna Shul
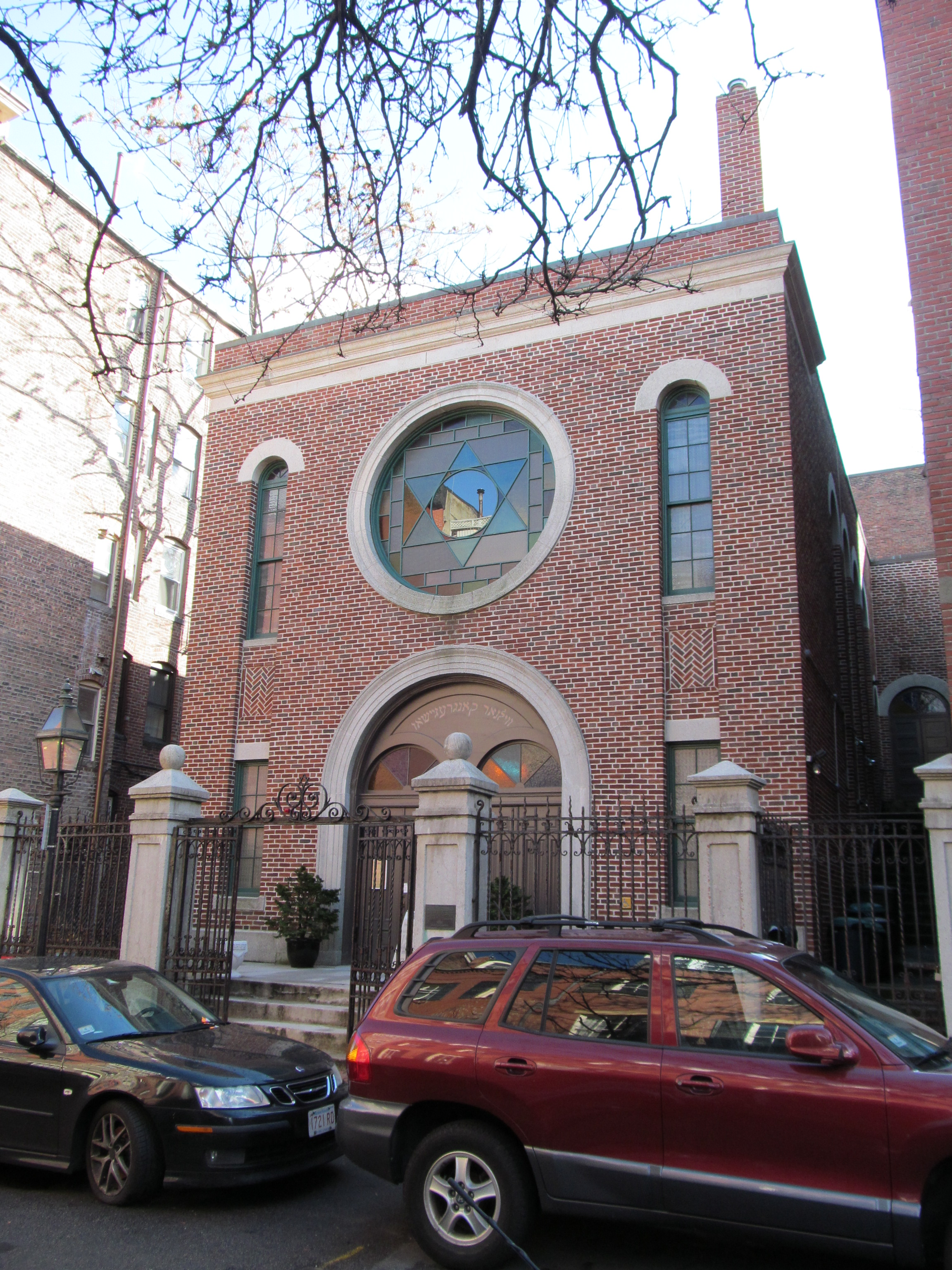
- The former synagogue

- Location in Boston

Religion
- Affiliation: Orthodox Judaism (former)
- Rite: Nusach Ashkenaz (former)
- Ecclesiastical or organisational status: Synagogue (1919 – c. 1985); Cultural center, living museum, community center (since c. 1996)
- Ownership: The Vilna Shul, Boston's Center for Jewish Culture, Inc.
- Status: Closed; repurposed

Location
- Location: 18 Phillips Street, Beacon Hill, Boston, Massachusetts 02114
- Country: United States
- Coordinates: 42°21′36″N 71°04′02″W

Architecture
- Architect: Max Kalman
- Type: Synagogue
- Established: 1906 (as a congregation)
- Completed: 1919

Website
- vilnashul.org (museum)

The Vilna Shul was an Orthodox Jewish synagogue located at 18 Phillips Street, on the north slope of Beacon Hill, in Boston, Massachusetts, in the United States. The synagogue building was built in 1919 for a congregation by immigrants primarily from Vilna, Lithuania.

The synagogue closed in the 1980s and has since been repurposed as The Vilna Shul – Boston’s Center for Jewish Culture, a cultural center, community center, and living museum with a focus on Jewish history.

== History ==
The front of the Hill has always been filled with stately homes and faces the Boston Common. The back of the Hill was the early residence of Boston's black community and, later, of a series of immigrant communities. In the first half of the 20th century, there were dozens of immigrant synagogues in this area and over 50 in the city of Boston proper. By the 1980s, the Jewish community had almost entirely left the neighborhood and the building was all but abandoned. An argument broke about whether the synagogue should be sold and the proceeds given to another congregation, turned into a community center for the residents of the neighborhood, or preserved as a monument or museum to the immigrant generations of Jews.

Designed by Boston architect Max Kalman, (Note: misprinted as David Kalman) the synagogue is not noted for its architecture, according to Stanley Smith, then executive director of Historic Boston Inc., a nonprofit group that recommended preserving the old synagogue:

It's not high style, not one of the great monuments of architecture that you would travel miles to see. It's like many of the early meetinghouses and churches that are highly representative of the immigrants who built them.

— Stanley Smith, Historic Boston Inc.

According to the American Jewish Historical Society, there is "no record of any important event ever taking place at that congregation," which was one of many modest synagogues built by Jewish immigrants.

The Vilna Center for Jewish Heritage was founded to raise funds to preserve and restore the synagogue for use as a Jewish cultural heritage center. This 501(c)(3) corporation is now The Vilna Shul, Boston's Center for Jewish Culture, Inc.

Three million dollars were spent on the architectural restoration of the synagogue building, which now houses a small exhibit on the history of the synagogue and of the history of Boston's Jewish community. The building opens certain weekdays and weekends is a regular part of the Beacon Hill and Boston tourist circuit. Besides being a historic, cultural, and community site, it serves as a location for regular Jewish religious services including major holidays, young family Shabbats, and is the home of Havurah on the Hill.
