= Beacon Hill Monument =

Monument in Boston, Massachusetts, U.S.

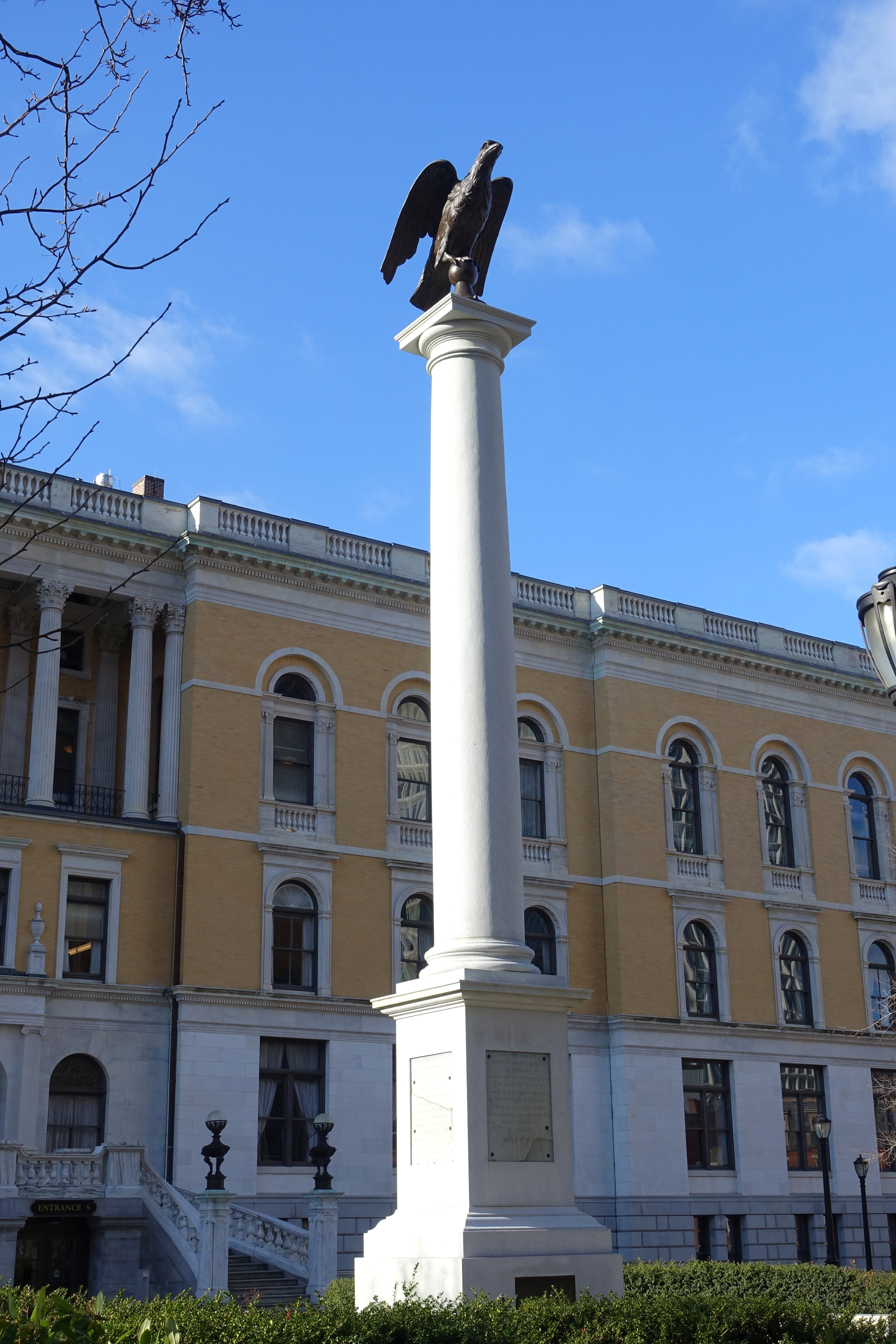
- The monument in 2014
- Interactive map of Beacon Hill Monument
- Location: Beacon Hill
- Coordinates: 42.359004°N 71.063250°W
- Type: Monument

The Beacon Hill Monument is installed in Boston's Beacon Hill, in the U.S. state of Massachusetts.

The monument was originally located on the summit of the 138 foot Beacon Hill, until the hill was cut down from 1804 to 1829 to fill in Mill Pond, the area around today's Canal and Causeway Streets. During this process in 1811 the monument was destroyed, albeit with the original plaques preserved. A 1:1 scale replica of the monument was created in 1898 and placed in its present location behind the Massachusetts State House, where the summit of Beacon Hill used to be.

== Gallery ==
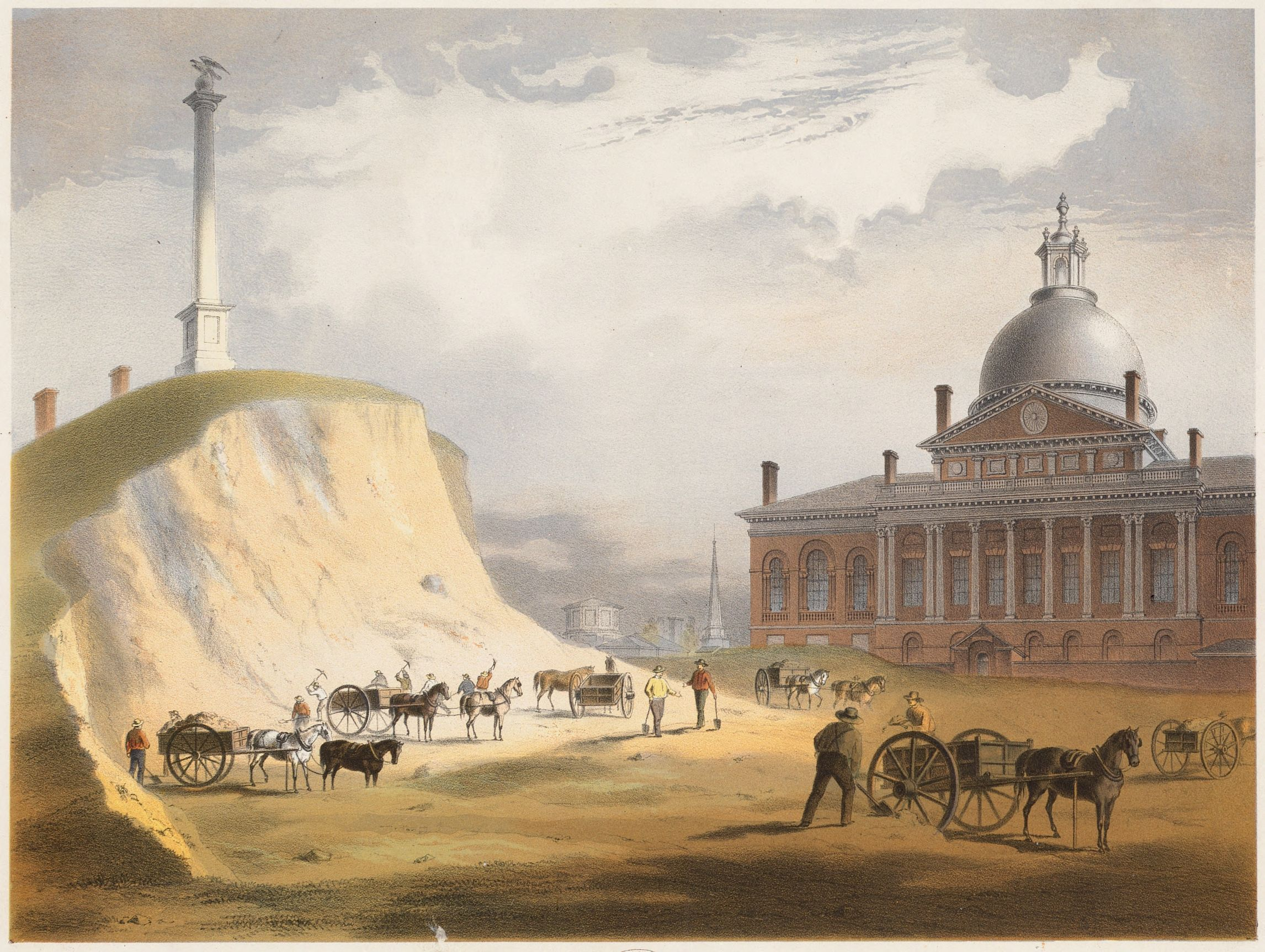
Beacon Hill in 1811 during its cut down shortly before original monument's demolition

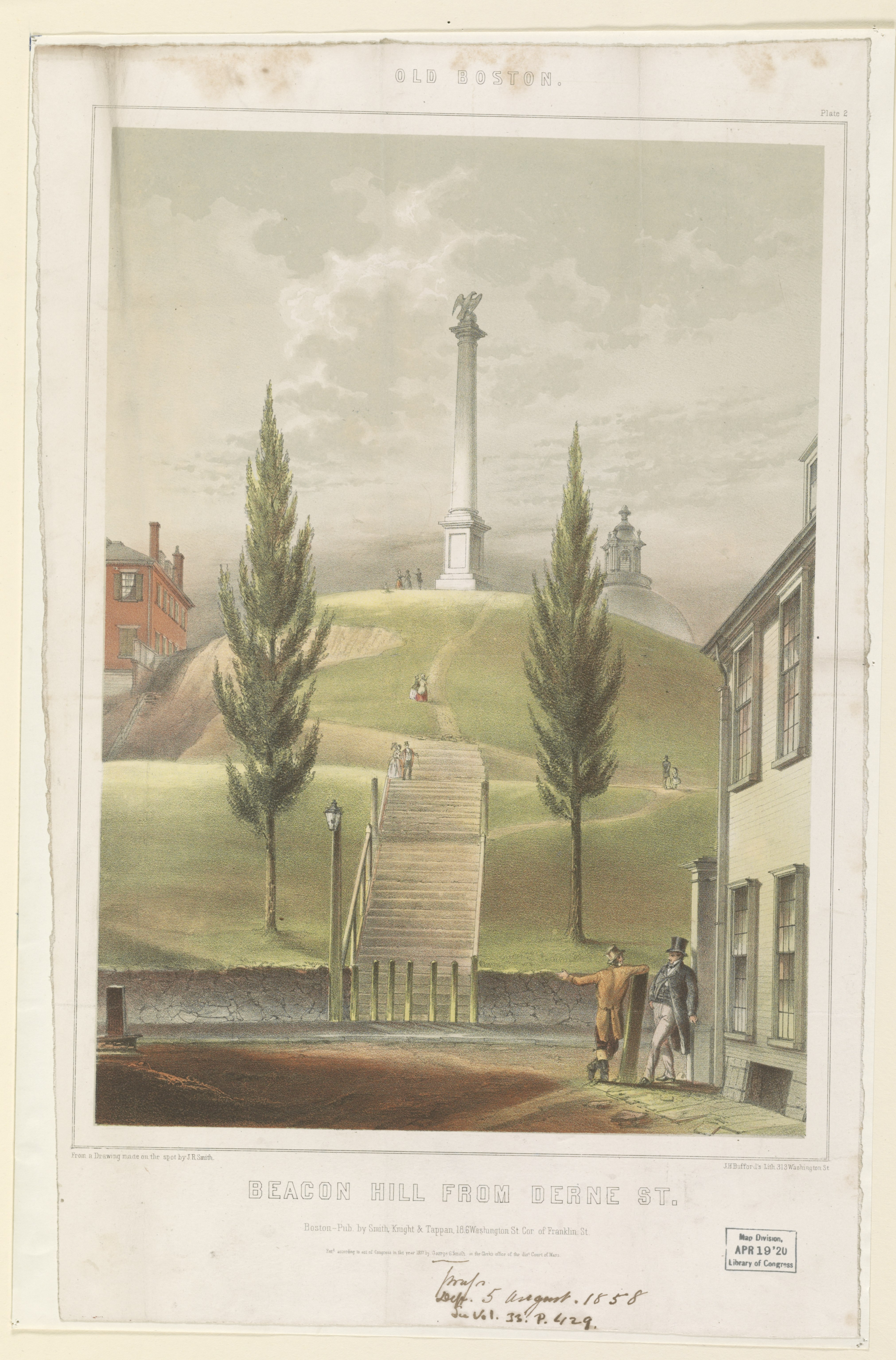
Beacon Hill and its monument prior to the cut down

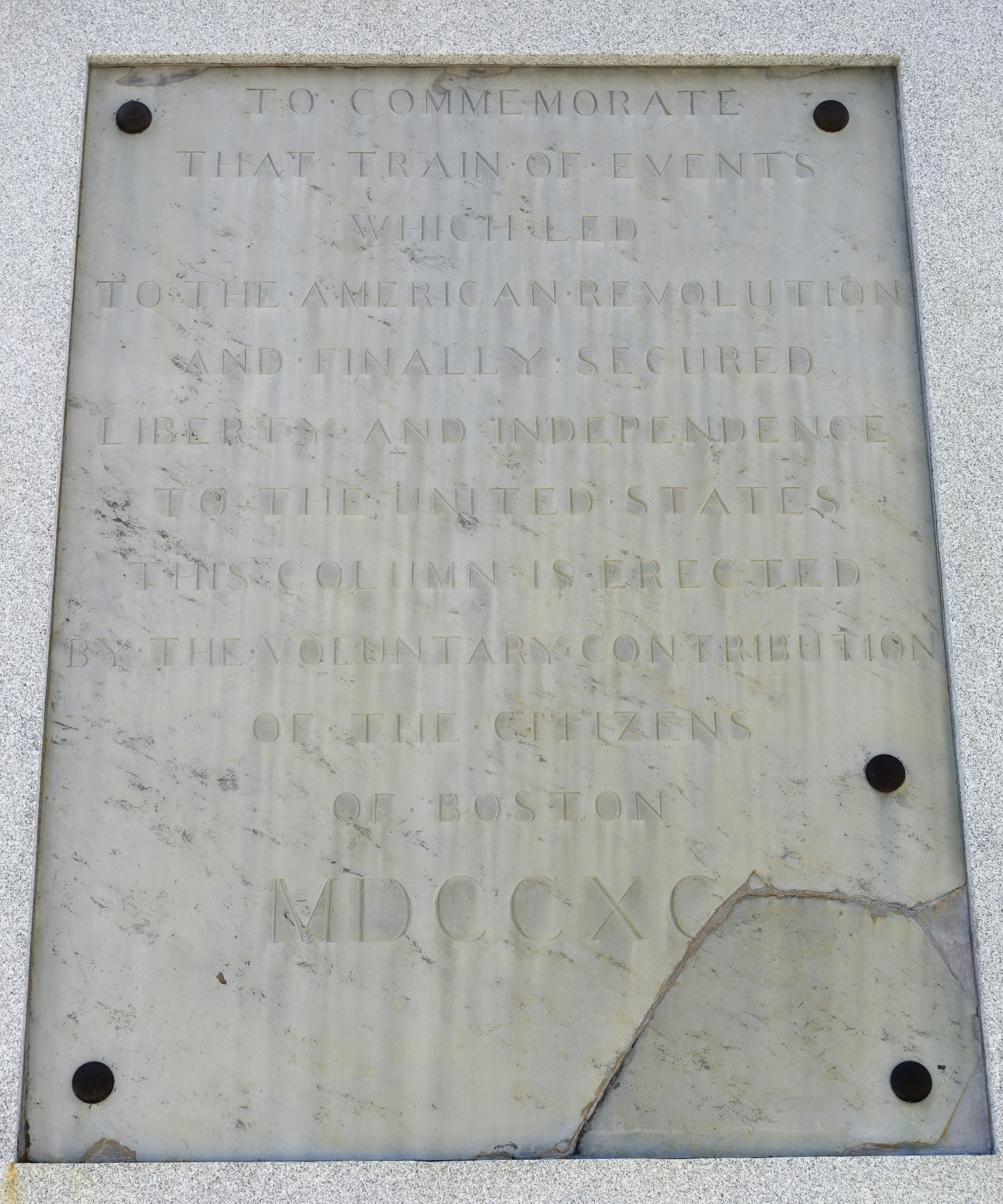
Original tablet 1

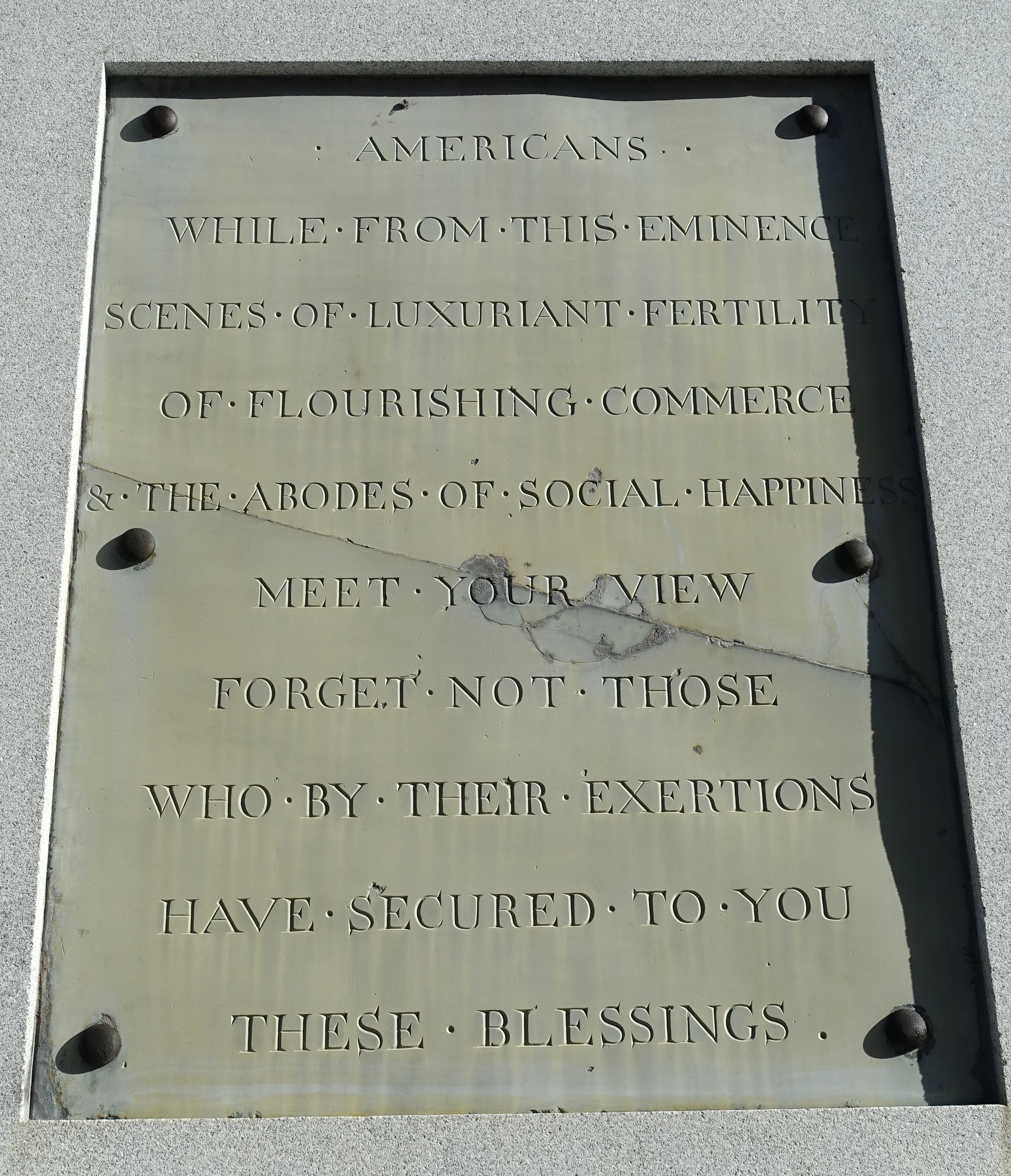
Original tablet 2

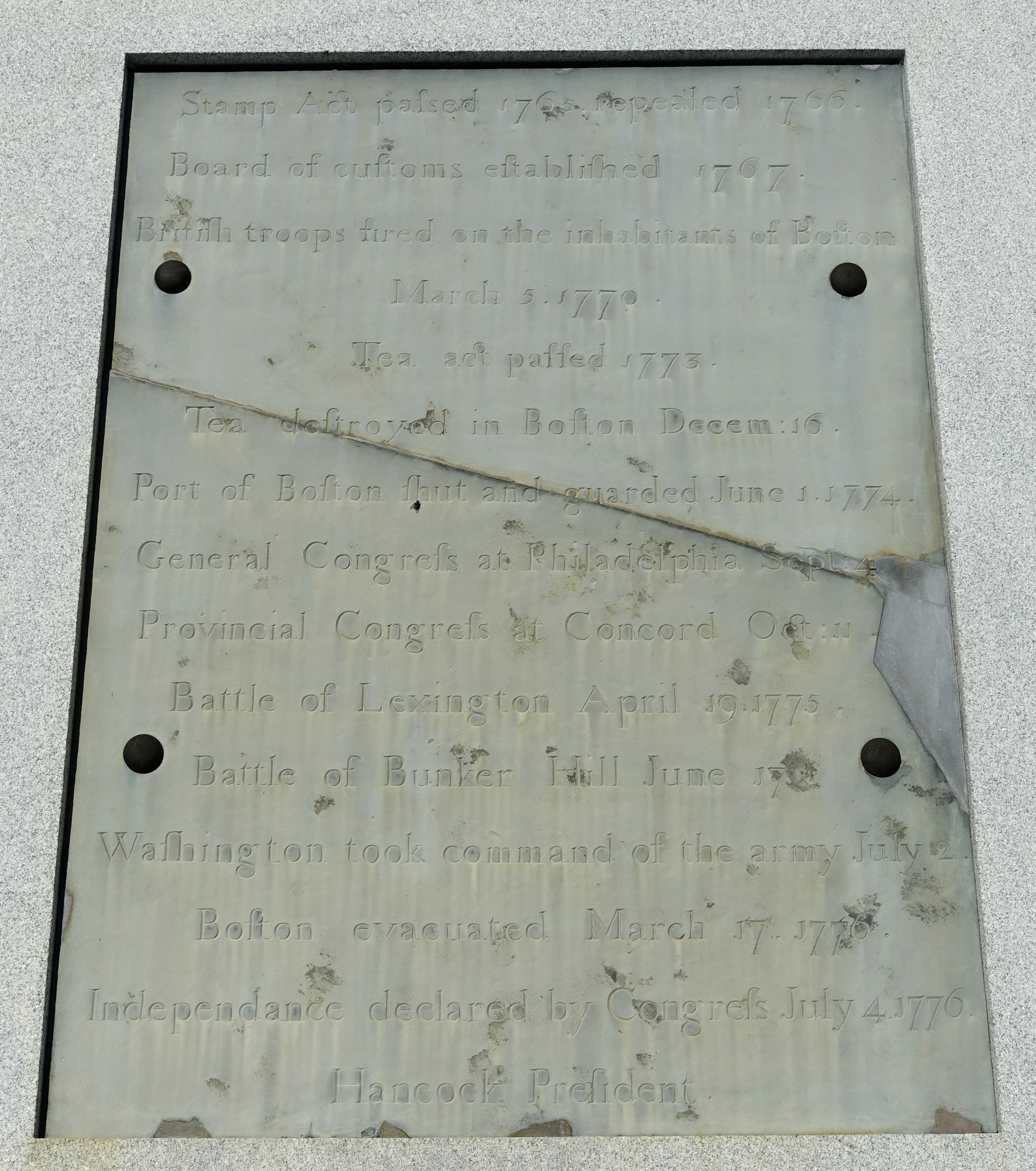
Original tablet 3

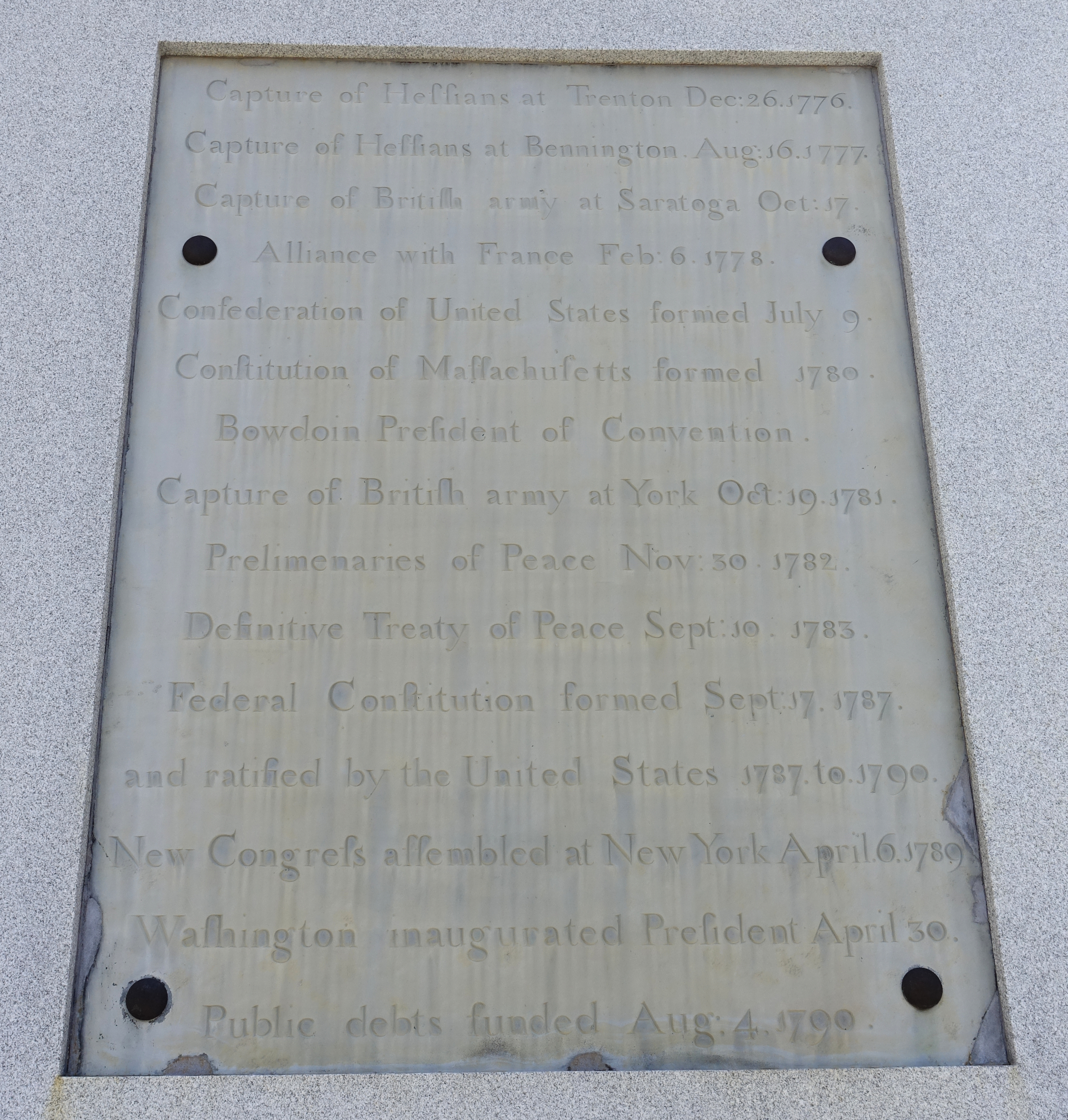
Original tablet 4
