= Nichols House Museum =

- The Nichols House Museum
- U.S. National Historic Landmark District – Contributing property
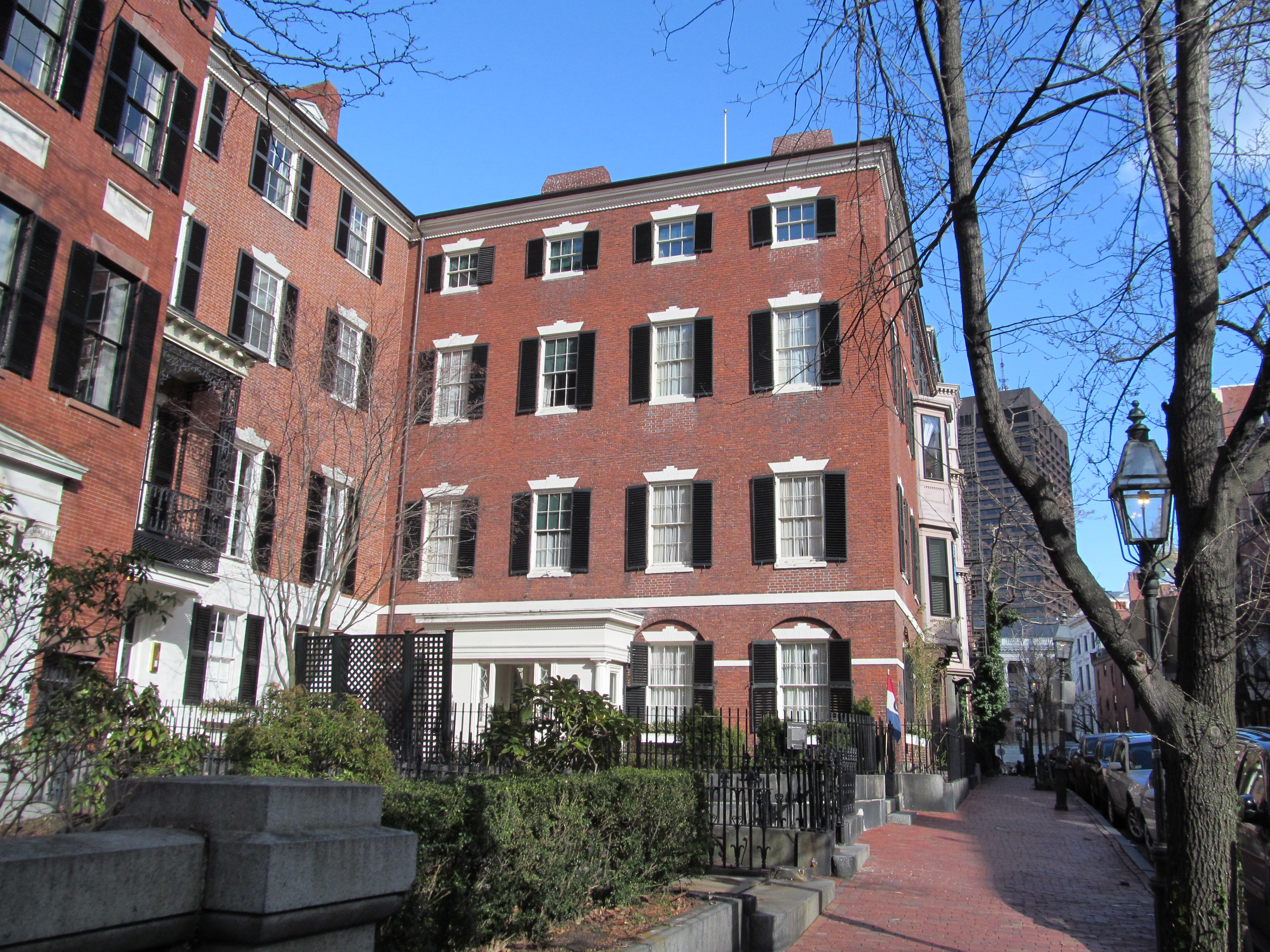
- The Nichols House Museum

- Location within Massachusetts Location within the United States
- Location: 55 Mount Vernon Street, Boston, Massachusetts 02108
- Coordinates: 42°21′31.21″N 71°03′57.32″W
- Built: 1804
- Architect: Charles Bulfinch
- Architectural style: Federal
- Website: nicholshousemuseum.org
- Part of: Beacon Hill Historic District (ID66000130)

The Nichols House Museum is a museum at 55 Mount Vernon Street on Beacon Hill in Boston, Massachusetts. The house in which it is located was designed by the architect Charles Bulfinch, and built by Jonathan Mason, the politician, in 1804. The building was renovated in 1830. The museum is named for Rose Standish Nichols (1872–1960), the renowned landscape gardener, suffragist, pacifist, and member of the Cornish Art Colony, who lived in the house between 1885 and 1960. She left the house to be used as a museum after her death. The museum preserves the lifestyle of the American upper class during Nichols' lifetime, with turn-of-the-century period rooms.
