= Ghost Town =

Ghost Town(s) or Ghosttown may refer to:

- Ghost town, a town that has been abandoned

== Film and television ==
- Ghost Town (1936 film), an American Western film by Harry L. Fraser
- Ghost Town (1956 film), an American Western film by Allen H. Miner
- Ghost Town (1988 film), an American horror film by Richard McCarthy (as Richard Governor)
- Ghost Town (2008 film), an American fantasy comedy film by David Koepp starring Ricky Gervais
- Ghost Town, a 2008 TV film featuring Billy Drago
- Derek Acorah's Ghost Towns, a 2005–2006 British paranormal reality television series
- "Ghost Town" (CSI: Crime Scene Investigation), a 2009 TV episode

== Literature ==
- Ghost Town (Lucky Luke) or La Ville fantôme, a 1965 Lucky Luke comic
- Ghost Town, a Beacon Street Girls novel by Annie Bryant
- Ghost Town, a 1998 novel by Robert Coover
- Ghosttown, a 2007 novel by Douglas Anne Munson
- Ghost Town (2019 novel), by Kevin Chen

== Music ==
- Ghost Town (band), an American electronic band
- Ghost Town, a 1939 ballet by Richard Rodgers

=== Albums ===
- Ghost Town (Bill Frisell album) or the title song, 2000
- Ghost Town (Duane Steele album) or the title song, 2006
- Ghost Town (Owen album), 2011
- Ghost Town (Poco album) or the title song, 1982
- Ghostown (The Radiators album), 1979
- Ghost Town, by Auryn, 2015

=== Songs ===
- "Ghost Town" (Adam Lambert song), 2015
- "Ghost Town" (Benson Boone song), 2021
- "Ghost Town" (Cary Brothers song), 2010
- "Ghost Town" (Cheap Trick song), 1988
- "Ghost Town" (Kanye West song), 2018
- "Ghosttown" (Madonna song), 2015
- "Ghost Town" (Shiny Toy Guns song), 2009
- "Ghost Town" (Specials song), 1981
- "Ghost Town", by the Bicycles from The Good, the Bad and the Cuddly, 2006
- "Ghost Town", by Blackbear from Misery Lake, 2021
- "Ghost Town", by Cat Stevens from Buddha and the Chocolate Box, 1974
- "Ghost Town", by Don Cherry, 1956
- "Ghost Town", by Egypt Central from White Rabbit, 2011
- "Ghost Town", by First Aid Kit from The Big Black and the Blue, 2010
- "Ghost Town", by Gemini from Geminism, 1987
- "Ghost Town", by Jake Owen from Days of Gold, 2013
- "Ghost Town", by Jeff Watson from Around the Sun, 1993
- "Ghost Town", by Katie Melua from Pictures, 2007
- "Ghost Town", by Naofumi Hataya from the soundtrack of Sonic Forces, 2017
- "Ghost Town", from the TV series Nashville; see Nashville discography#Season Three, 2014
- "Ghost Town", by Strung Out from Prototypes and Painkillers, 2009
- "Ghost Towns", by Bob Weir from Blue Mountain, 2016
- "Ghost Town", by Breaking Southwest, 2016

== Other uses ==
- Ghost Town (video game), a 1980 computer game developed by Adventure International
- Ghost Town, Oakland, California, a district neighborhood
- Ghost Town Village, an abandoned Wild West theme park in Maggie Valley, North Carolina, US
- Ghost Town, a themed area in Knott's Berry Farm, Buena Park, California, US
- Ghosttown, an area in The Great Escape and Hurricane Harbor theme park, Queensbury, New York, US
- Ghost Town (gang), a street gang in Belize

== See also ==
- Ghost city (disambiguation)
- Ghost estate, an unoccupied residential area
- Ghost station, an abandoned railway station
