= Love Again =

Love Again may refer to:

== Films ==
- Love Again (2003 film), a 2003 British biographical television film
- Love Again (2023 film), a 2023 American romantic comedy-drama film

== Music ==
=== Albums ===
- Love Again (Ayumi Hamasaki album), 2013
- Love Again (John Denver album) or the title song, 1996
- Love Again (soundtrack), 2023

=== Songs ===
- "Love Again" (Brandy and Daniel Caesar song), 2019
- "Love Again" (Cedric Gervais song), 2014
- "Love Again" (Celine Dion song), 2023
- "Love Again" (Dua Lipa song), 2021
- "Love Again" (Hedley song), 2017
- "Love Again" (The Kid Laroi song), 2023
- "Love Again" (Kreesha Turner song), 2012
- "Love Again" (NM song), from the video game Dance Dance Revolution, 2009
- "Love Again", by Baekhyun from Delight, 2020
- "Love Again", by Carly Rae Jepsen from Emotion, 2015
- "Love Again", by Cascada from Everytime We Touch, 2007
- "Love Again", by Eddie Cochran from Never to Be Forgotten, 1962
- "Love Again", by Girl's Day from Girl's Day Everyday 5, 2017
- "Love Again", by Kelly Rowland from the soundtrack for the film Meet the Browns, 2008
- "Love Again", by Pentatonix from PTX, Vols. 1 & 2, 2014
- "Love Again", by Rae Morris from Unguarded, 2015
- "Love Again", by Todd O'Neill, 2017
- "Love Again", by Tweet, 2009
- "Love Again (Akinyele Back)", by Run the Jewels from Run the Jewels 2, 2014

== Other uses ==
- Love Again (TV series), a 2012 South Korean series
- "Love Again", a 1974 poem by Philip Larkin

== See also ==
- To Love Again (disambiguation)
