= Beacon Street =

Street in Greater Boston, Massachusetts

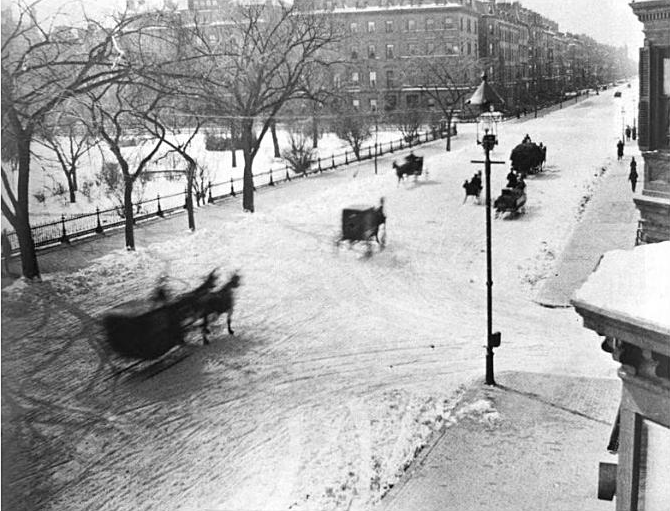
- Beacon Street, c. 1897
- Interactive map of Beacon Street
- Component highways: Route 2 between Arlington and Charles Streets
- Location: between Newton and Boston
- West end: Route 16 in Newton
- Major junctions: US 20 / I-90 at Commonwealth Avenue; Route 2 at Arlington Street; Route 2 at Charles Street
- East end: Tremont Street

Beacon Street is a major east–west street in Boston, Massachusetts, and its western suburbs of Brookline and Newton. It passes through many of Boston's central and western neighborhoods, including Beacon Hill, Back Bay, Fenway–Kenmore, the Boston University campus, Brighton, and Chestnut Hill.

It is not to be confused with the Beacon Street in nearby Somerville or others elsewhere.

== Description ==
=== Boston ===
Beacon Street begins as a one-way street from the intersection of Tremont Street and School Street. From this point, it rises up Beacon Hill for a block where it meets Park Street in front of the Massachusetts State House. From that intersection it descends Beacon Hill as a two-lane, bi-directional street in the Back Bay until it reaches Charles Street at a point dividing Boston Common from the Boston Public Garden. At Charles Street, it becomes a one-way avenue that runs through the Back Bay neighborhood until it reaches Kenmore Square, or the intersection with Commonwealth Avenue (Route 2).

=== Brookline ===
From Kenmore Square, Beacon Street skirts the area around Fenway Park and follows a southwesterly slant through Brookline along either side of the MBTA Green Line trolley tracks to Cleveland Circle in Brighton. From there it passes through Chestnut Hill, including the Chestnut Hill Reservoir and Boston College.

=== Newton ===
It winds its way into the city of Newton, where it crosses the Hammond Pond Parkway and crosses Centre Street to form the defining intersection of Newton Centre. Then, it meets Walnut Street at "Four Corners" near the Newton Cemetery, and goes through Waban at its intersection with Woodward Street. It ends at Washington Street (Route 16) near a junction with Boston's circumferential highway, Interstate 95 (also cosigned as Route 128).

== History ==
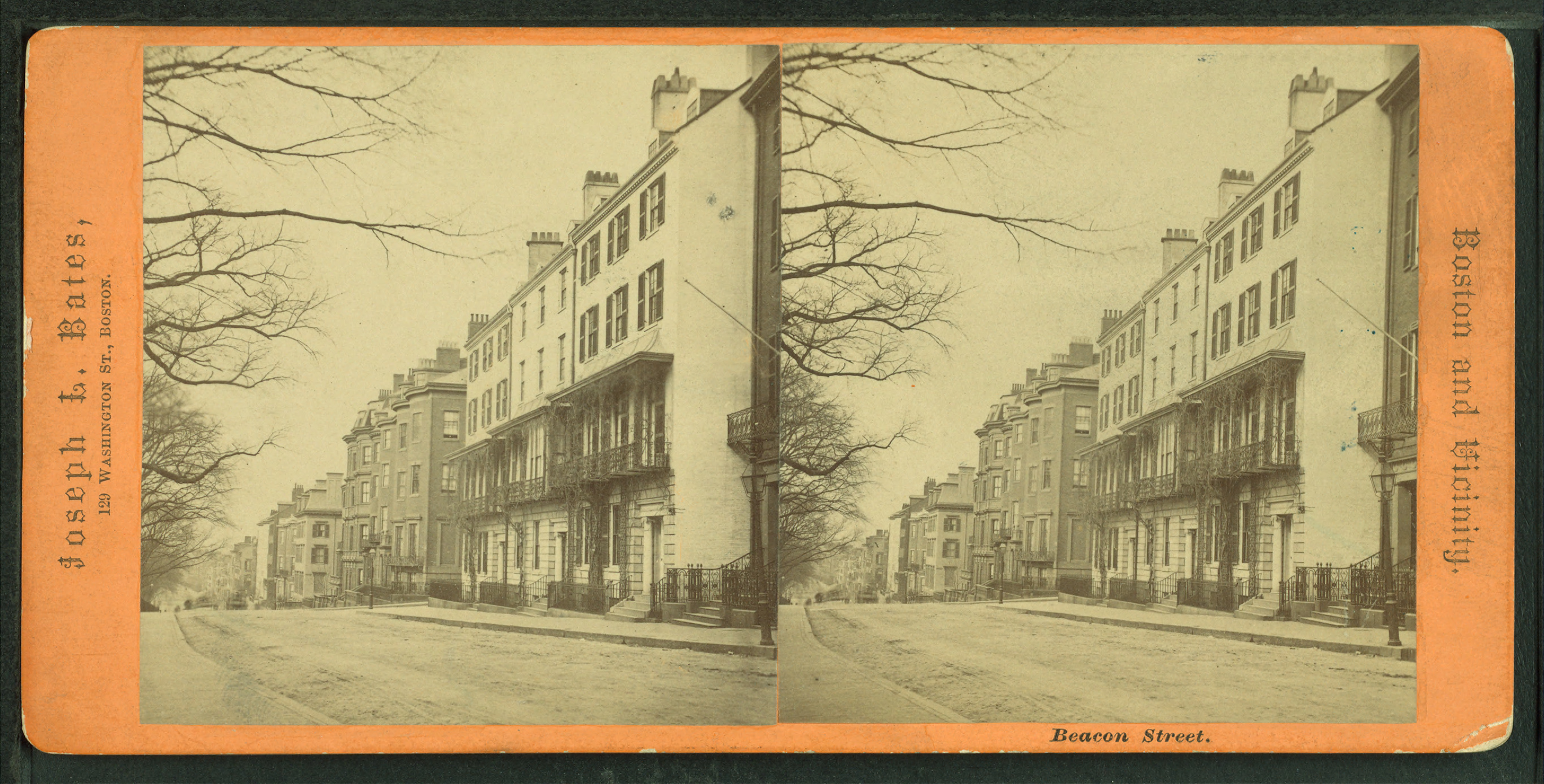
Stereoscopic image of Beacon Street by Joseph L. Bates

Beacon Street initially formed the northern limit of Boston Common, and was extended over the Charles River Basin as a dam that would later form the shore between a narrowed river and the newly filled-in Back Bay neighborhood. The part of Beacon Street west of Kenmore Square was originally laid out in 1850. Railroad tracks were first laid in 1888 for what would eventually become the modern Green Line C branch.

In July 2020, the state awarded $32,000 for a feasibility study and conceptual design of restoration of the original bridle path, which ran along the median of the Brookline portion.

== In popular culture ==
- Robert McCloskey's 1941 children's book Make Way for Ducklings features a mother duck leading her eight ducklings across Beacon Street, with the help of four members of the Boston Police Department.
- The Beacon Street Girls series of preteen books is set around Beacon Street in Brookline.
- Nanci Griffith's 1987 album Lone Star State of Mind has a song called "Beacon Street".
- Beacon Street is the location of the fictional pizza parlor Beacon Street Pizza during the first season of the sitcom Two Guys and a Girl.
- 112 1/2 is the address of the fictional bar Cheers. The actual location of the exterior shots is 84 Beacon Street.
- The Unitarian Universalist Association managed to confuse the numbers on this street. In 1927, moving from 25 Beacon Street down the street, they wanted to keep the number 25, and convinced the legislature to pass a law to keep it.
- In Rick Riordan's Magnus Chase and the Gods of Asgard, a main character owns a shop on Beacon Street and the shop appears several times throughout the series.
- 14 Beacon Street was used in the series Ally McBeal as the exterior location for the law firm Cage & Fish (later Cage, Fish, & McBeal), which was located on the 7th floor of this building.

== Image gallery ==
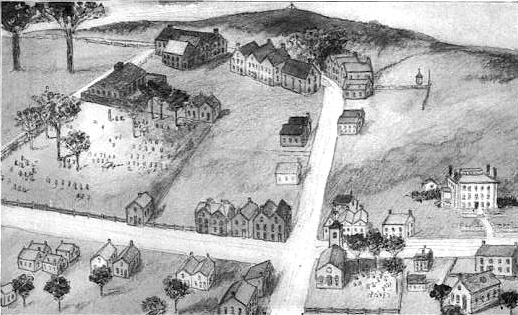
1922 artist's recreation of Beacon Street as it was in 1722 (upper left)

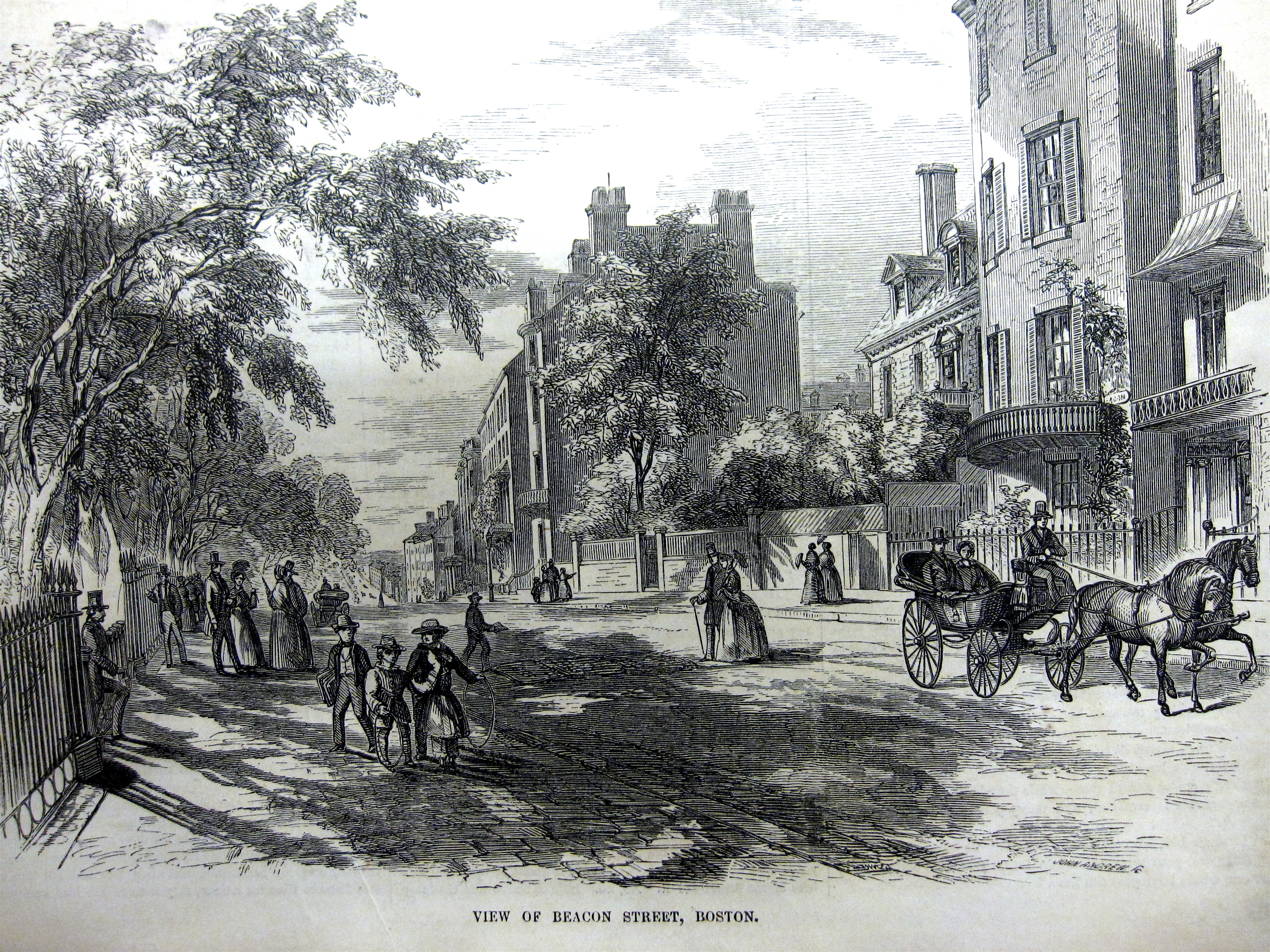
Illustration of Beacon Street, Boston in the 1850s

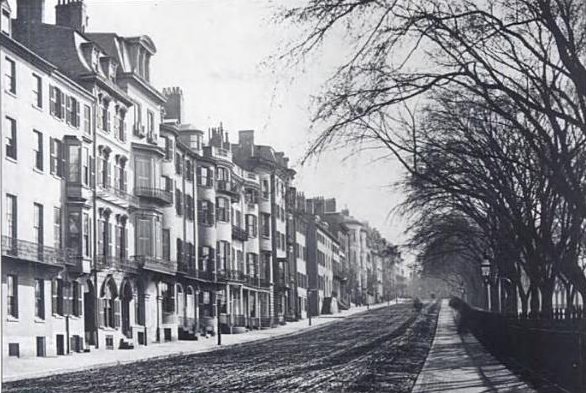
Beacon St., 1870

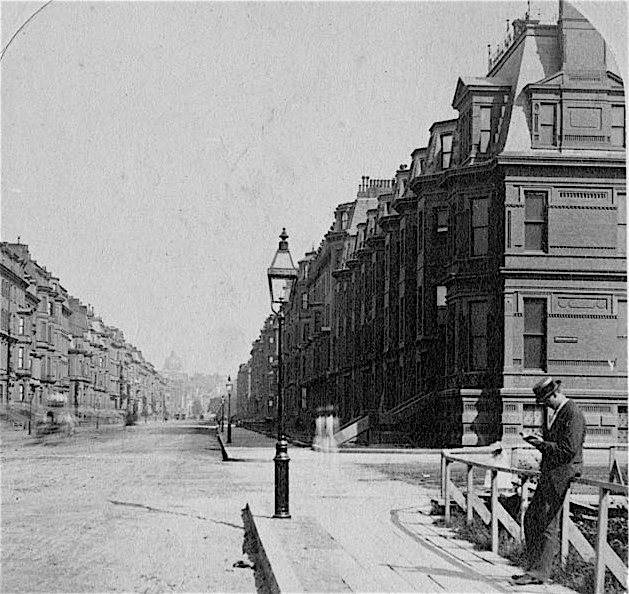
Beacon St., Back Bay, c. 1870s

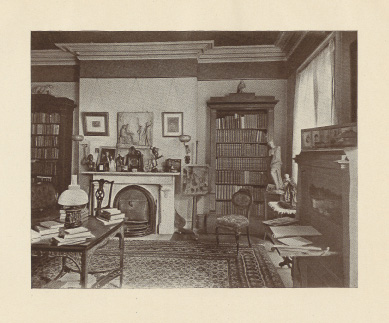
Interior of 241 Beacon St., former home of Julia Ward Howe, 19th century

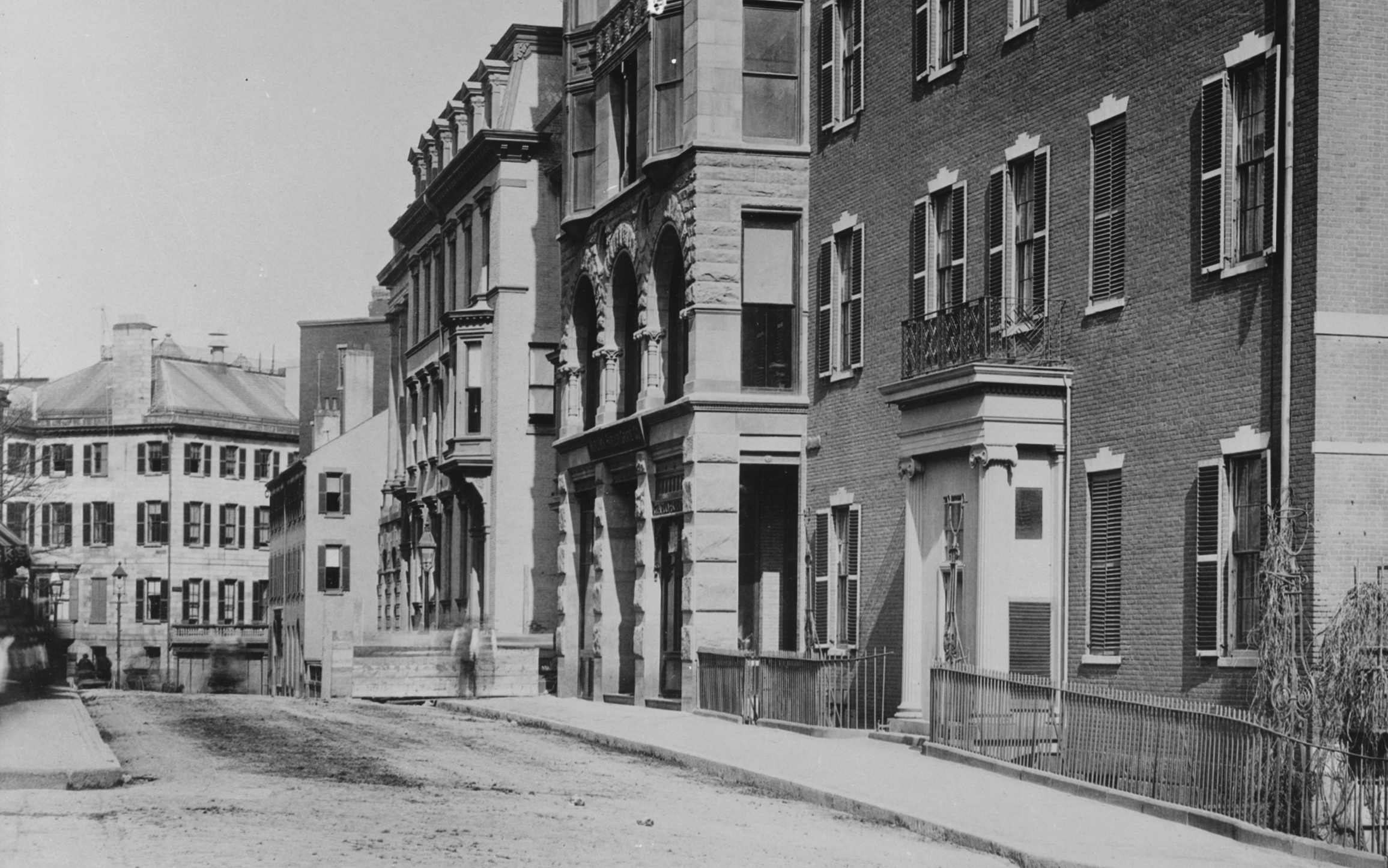
Top of Beacon St., across from the State House, c. 1885

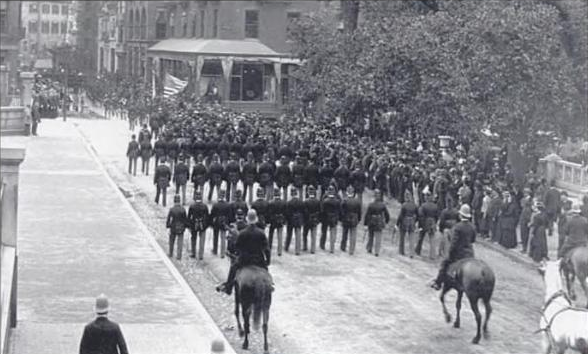
Parade of the Ancient and Honorable Artillery Company of Massachusetts, 1900

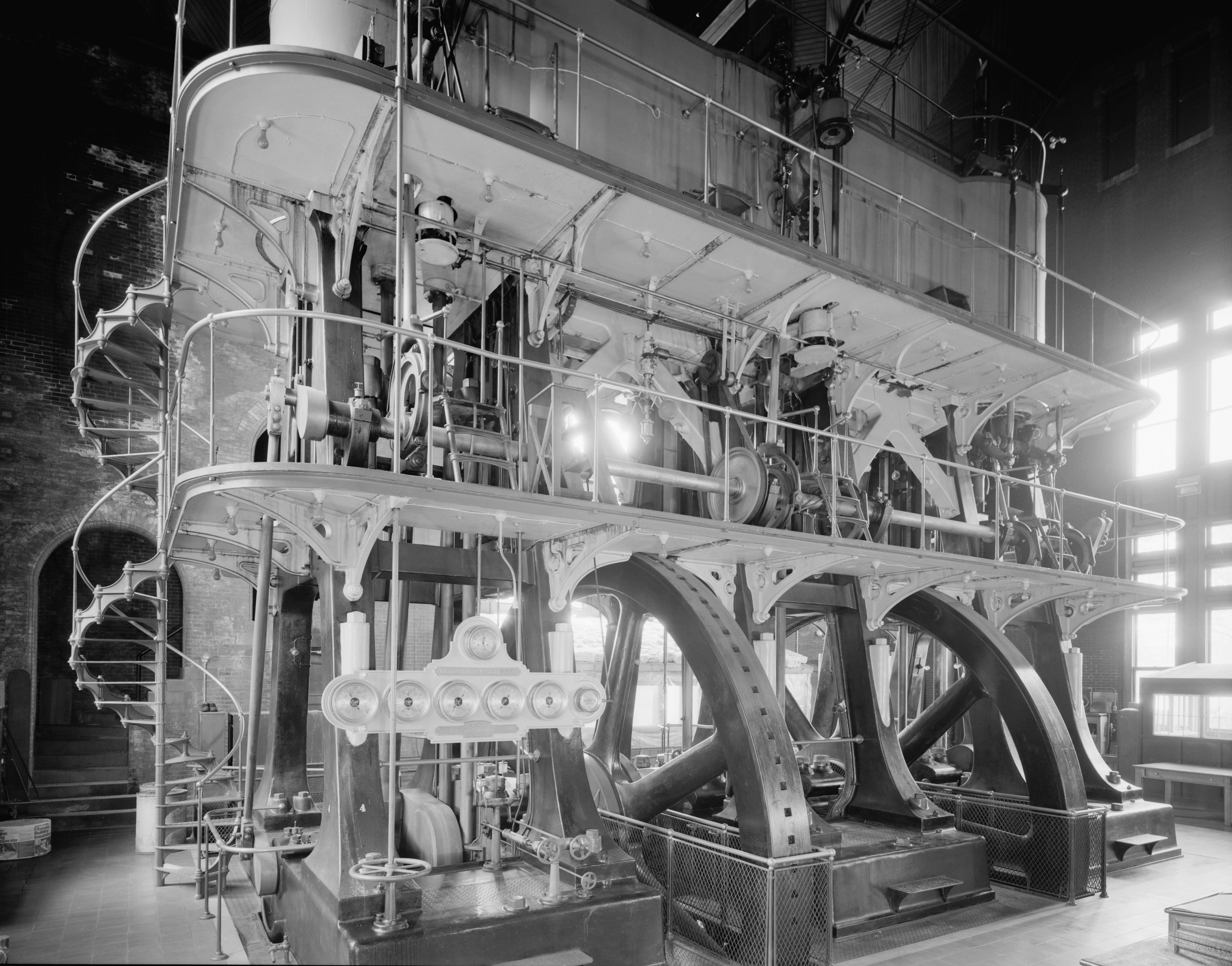
Boston Water Works, Chestnut Hill High-Service Pumping Station, 2450 Beacon Street, c. 1970s(?)

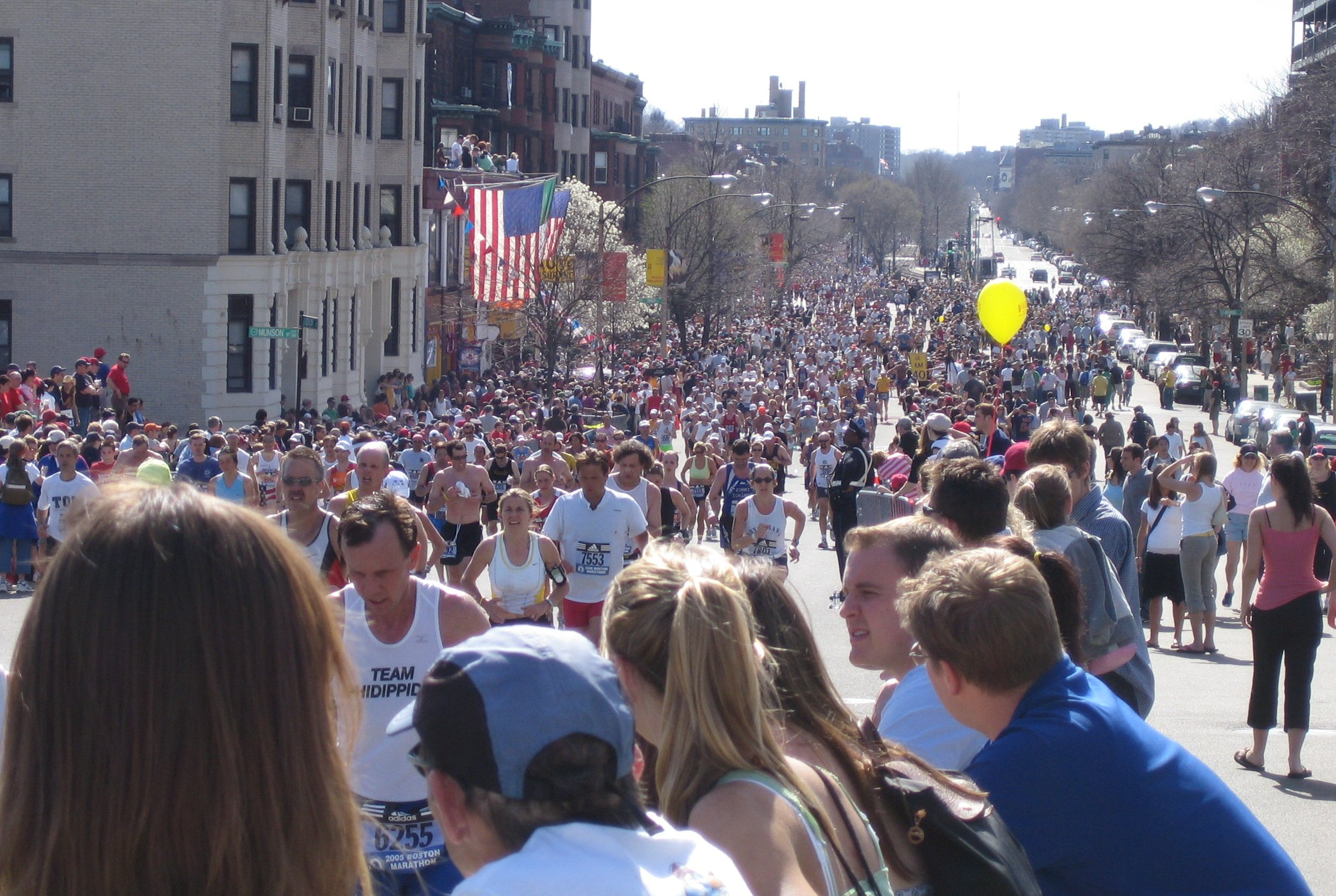
Boston Marathon, mile 25, Beacon St., 2005

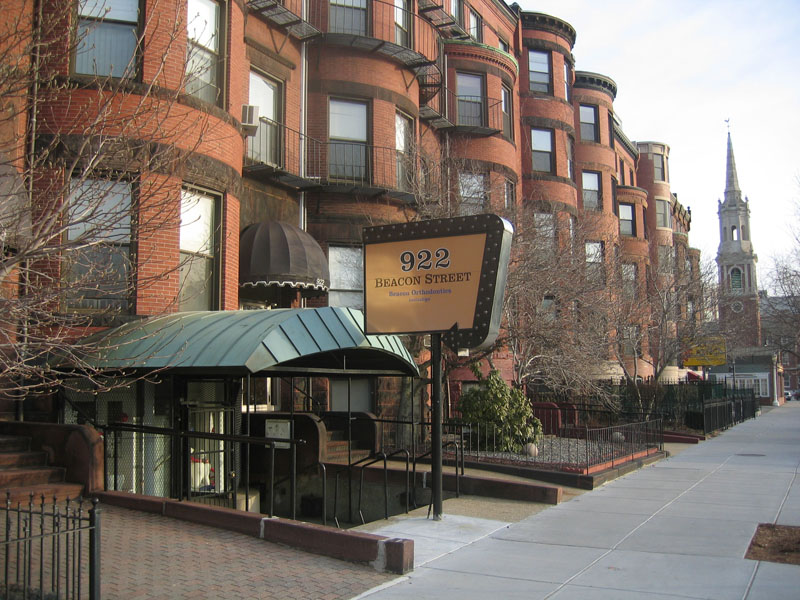
922 Beacon Street in 2006 with Ruggles Baptist Church in the background

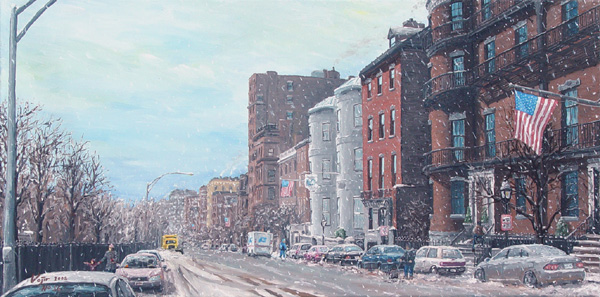
Boston's Beacon Street (2008) by R. Vojir featuring the Somerset Club

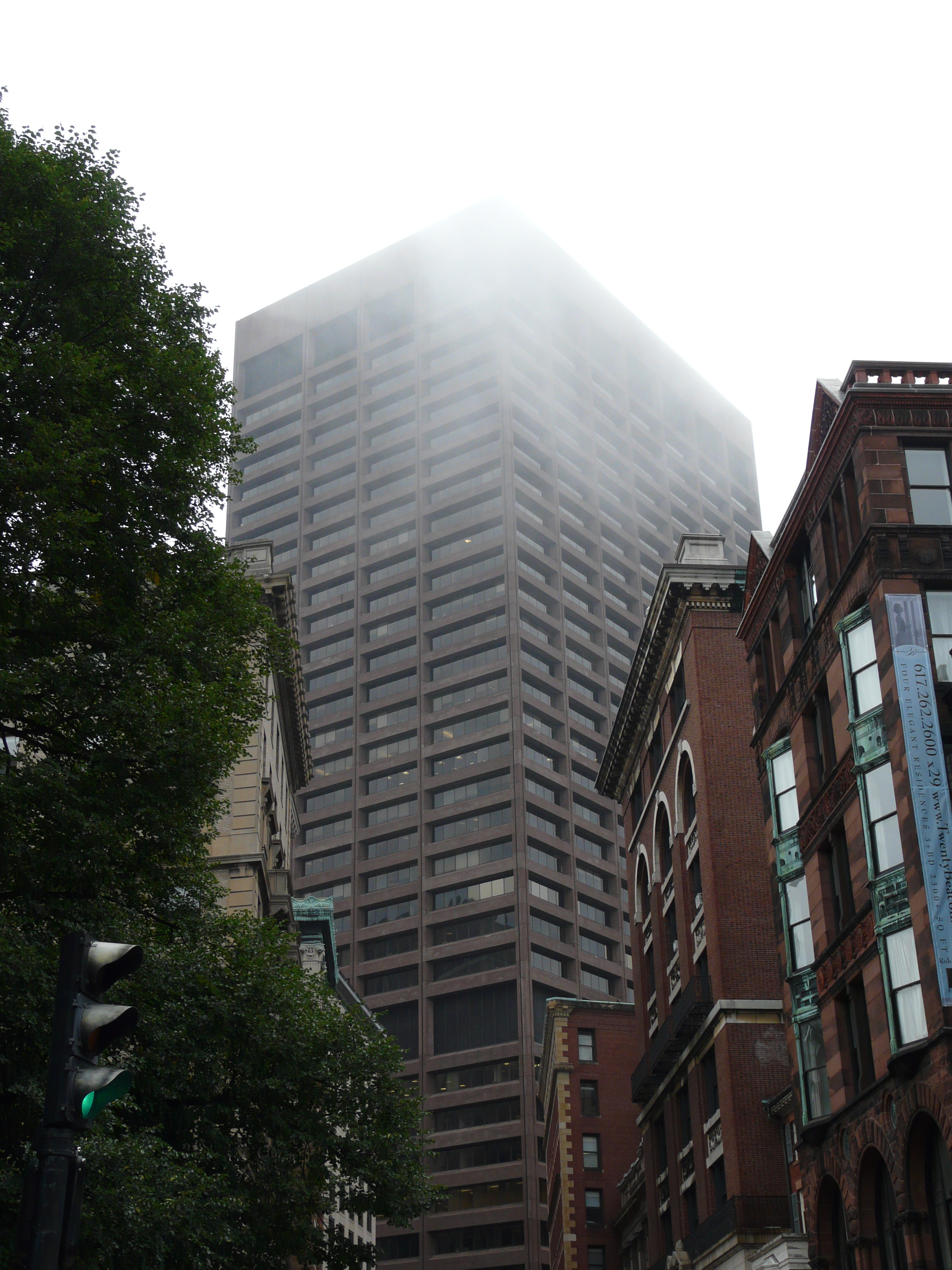
Top of Beacon St., showing One Beacon Street building, 2008

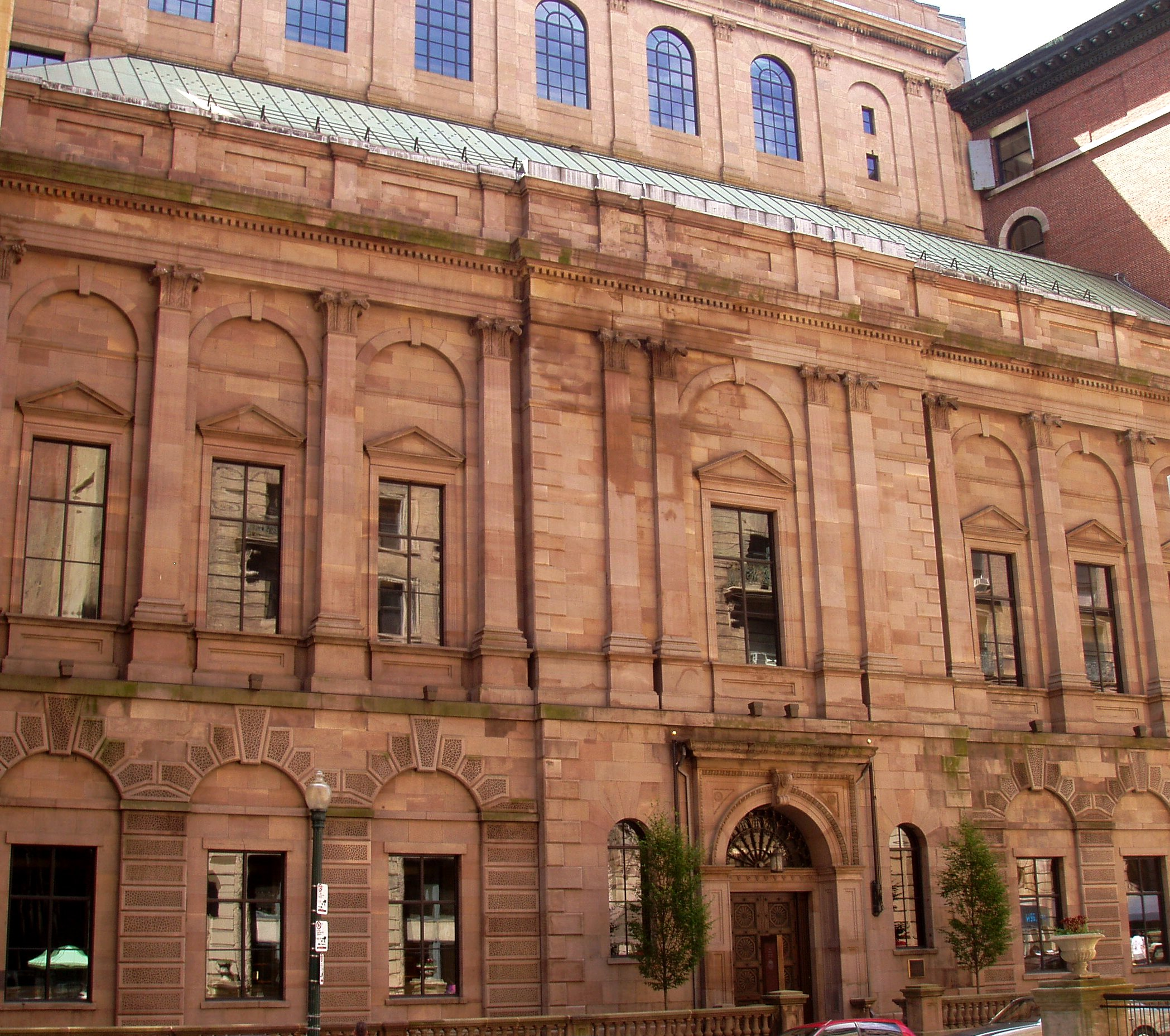
Facade of the Boston Athenaeum

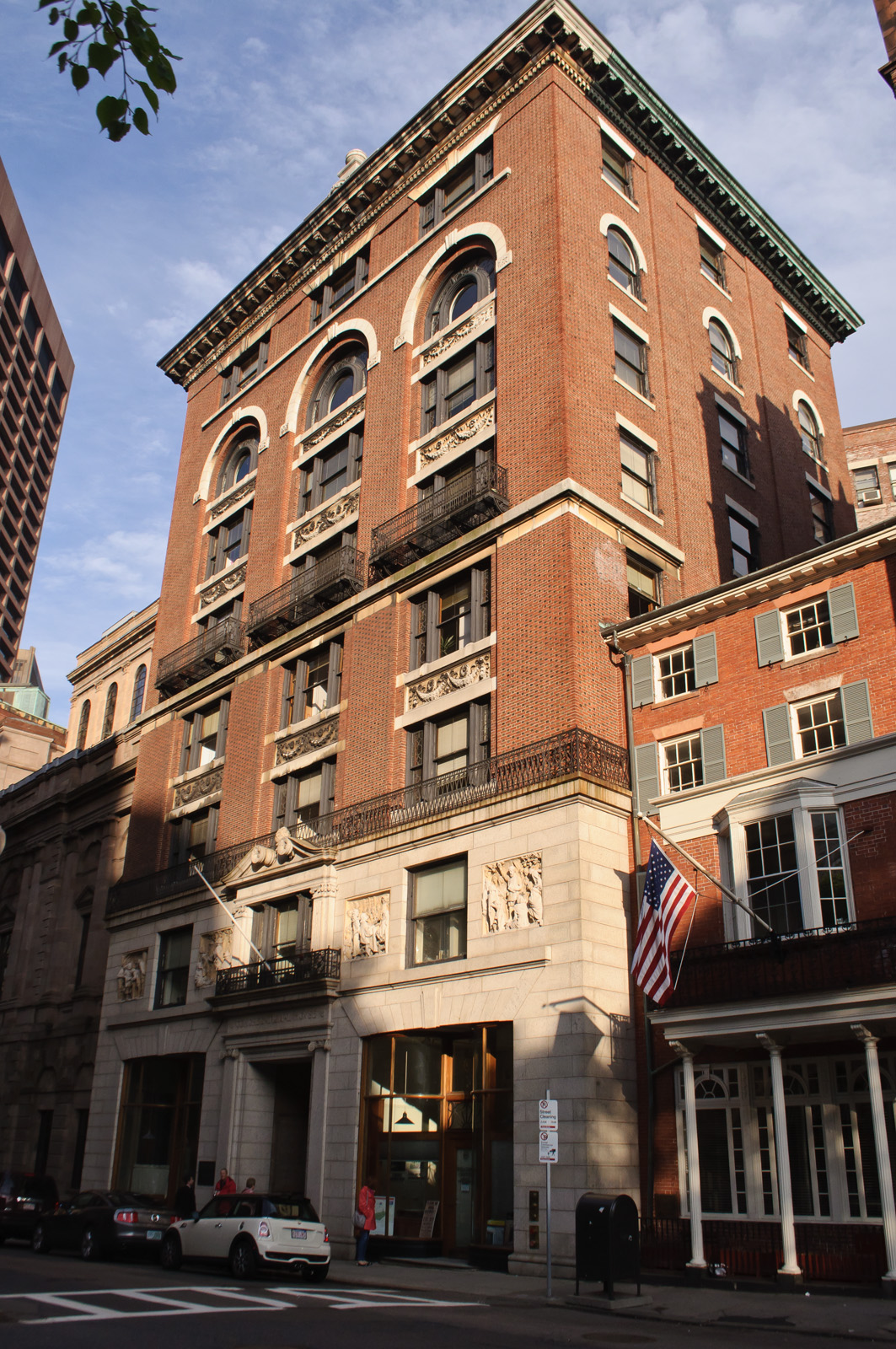
14 Beacon Street, from the series Ally McBeal, as the exterior the location of the law firm "Cage & Fish" (later "Cage, Fish, & McBeal"), which was located on the 7th floor of this building

New England Chassidic Center of Boston (Hasidic dynasty). Located at 1710 Beacon St in Brookline.

== See also ==
- Amory–Ticknor House
- Nathan Appleton Residence
- Beacon Street Girls
- Boston Athenæum
- Boston Bar Association
- Boston Transit Commission Building
- Cheers Beacon Hill
- Chester Harding House
- Dean Road station
- Gibson House Museum
- Hancock Manor
- Headquarters House
- Harrison Gray Otis House
- Oliver Wendell Holmes Sr. lived on Beacon St. 1871–1894
- Julia Ward Howe lived on Beacon St.
- Kenmore Square
- Leavitt-Riedler Pumping Engine
- Massachusetts State House
- Mount Vernon Church
- Myles Annex
- Myles Standish Hall
- One Beacon Street
- Page Company, former tenant
- John Phillips, mayor, lived on Beacon St. (corner of Walnut Street), 1804–1823
- William H. Prescott lived on Beacon St. 1845–1859
- Robert Gould Shaw Memorial
- Washington Square
