= To Live Again =

To Live Again may refer to:

- To Live Again (film), a 1963 short documentary film
- To Live Again (novel), a 1969 science fiction novel by Robert Silverberg
- To Live Again , a 2001 novel by Lurlene McDaniel

== See also ==
- To Love Again (disambiguation)
- "Learning to Live Again", a song
