= Big Machine Records =

American record label

- Parent company: Borchetta Entertainment Group
- Founded: September 1, 2005; 21 years ago
- Founder: Scott Borchetta
- Distributor: Universal Music Group
- Genre: Country; pop; rock
- Country of origin: United States
- Location: Nashville, Tennessee
- Official website: www.bigmachinerecords.com

Big Machine Records is an American record label, distributed by Universal Music Group. Big Machine is based on Music Row in Nashville, Tennessee. The label was founded in September 2005 by former DreamWorks Records executive Scott Borchetta and became a joint venture between Borchetta and country singer Toby Keith. The American singer-songwriter Taylor Swift was the first artist signed by the label. The purchase of Big Machine Records by Scooter Braun in 2019 resulted in a highly publicized dispute with Swift regarding the ownership of the masters to the albums.

== History ==
Big Machine Records was founded by Scott Borchetta, a former punk rock bass guitar player who had worked in the mailroom of his father Mike's music company and became a promotions staff member in 1991 for Universal Music Group's MCA Records. According to Bloomberg Businessweek, Borchetta was an "involved manager" at MCA, "choosing singles and dispensing advice." After he was fired from MCA in 1997, Borchetta accepted a role at the Nashville division of DreamWorks Records, but later decided to start his own label after Universal acquired the division. Before he left DreamWorks, Borchetta approached Taylor Swift and her family after the musician performed at the Bluebird Café in Nashville, Tennessee, after first meeting her in 2004. At the time, Borchetta had no infrastructure or financing. He made an offer to Swift and her parents, whereby he would recruit her to the new label's roster after it was established. Swift eventually recontacted Borchetta around two weeks later, telling him: "I'm looking for you."

He formed the label in 2005, naming it "Big Machine" after a 2004 song by the band Velvet Revolver. The first signees to Big Machine were Jack Ingram and Danielle Peck. Big Machine's first album release was Ingram's Live: Wherever You Are, a re-release of a live album he had previously issued independently in 2004. The album features two new studio tracks, "Wherever You Are" and "Love You", both of which were released as singles. In mid-2006, "Wherever You Are" off this album reached number one on Billboard Hot Country Songs, thus becoming the label's first single to top that chart.

Soon after, Big Machine released Swift's first ever recording, the single "Tim McGraw" and her debut album Taylor Swift. Keith dropped his affiliation with the label in 2006, but he was reported as an equity holder in November 2014, alongside the Swift family and Borchetta (the latter reportedly owning 60 percent of the company at the time). In October 2012, Borchetta told Rolling Stone magazine: "[Taylor Swift's father] Scott Swift owns three percent of Big Machine."

By March 2009, Big Machine artist Danielle Peck had left the label. The departure occurred during a downturn period for the overall U.S. music industry.

In February 2010, Swift won four Grammys—including Album of the Year (Fearless), Best Country Album (Fearless), Best Country Song ("White Horse"), and Best Female Country Vocal Performance ("White Horse")—becoming the first Big Machine artist to win a Grammy Award.

Borchetta signed a deal with Clear Channel—which later changed its name to iHeartMedia—in 2012 that ensures payment for Big Machine artists from terrestrial and digital radio airplay. Three years after the deal was signed, Borchetta said that the revenue streams were "very meaningful."

In November 2014, Borchetta denied a claim that he was looking to sell Big Machine for $200 million following the release of Swift's then-upcoming fifth studio album 1989: "Every time we have a Taylor [Swift] record, they're like, 'Oh, he's selling the company.'" Borchetta did not, however, rule out a future change of ownership, stating that "the business is changing so quickly, and if I see a strategic opportunity that's going to be better for our artists and executives, it's going to be a serious conversation." Following the release of 1989, Swift's contract with Big Machine obliged her to produce one more full-length album for the label.

The Zac Brown Band announced on January 12, 2015, that it had finalized a four-way strategic partnership involving the Southern Ground Artists record label, Big Machine Label Group, Republic Records and John Varvatos Records for the release of its fourth studio album. The terms of the deal stated that Zac Brown Band would work with Big Machine Label Group for marketing and distribution, while Southern Ground Artists would work on radio promotion, Republic provided support in the area of non-country radio formats and international promotion, and Varvatos oversaw branding and styling.

In a February 2015 interview, Borchetta refused to comment on the status of the label's distribution deal with Universal Music Group (UMG), which was up for renegotiation at the time. He confirmed that the label would release the next American Idol album, in partnership with 19 Entertainment and UMG—Borchetta would be one of the mentors on the reality program's next series. Borchetta also disclosed that Swift agreed to the withdrawal of her catalog from Spotify after he first suggested the idea to her, and that he would remove the music of all Big Machine artists if it was within his power.

In May 2017, the label branched out into the alcoholic beverage industry by launching Big Machine Vodka, a premium brand distilled in Lynnville, Tennessee. Borchetta described the new venture as "perfectly [complementing] the music we take such great pride in".

In November 2017, Swift released her sixth studio album Reputation, her last album released under Big Machine before her contract with the label expired in November 2018. Swift later signed with Republic Records, under a deal in which she would maintain ownership of her master recordings going forward.

=== Spotify dispute ===
On November 3, 2014, Swift removed all but one of her songs from Spotify after indications of her disapproval of the streaming service emerged in July of the same year. Swift, one of the world's most popular musicians at the time, had previously delayed the streaming of her 2012 album, Red.

Big Machine country music artists Justin Moore and Brantley Gilbert removed their music from Spotify on November 12, 2014. Like Swift, both artists allowed a single song to remain on the streaming platform.

After Swift and Big Machine withdrew her catalog from Spotify in November 2014, the streaming service launched a social media campaign to persuade Swift to return and, in a statement on its website, claimed that 16 million of over 40 million users had played her music in the preceding 30-day period.

In mid-November, Borchetta disputed figures released by Spotify that claimed that Swift would receive US$6 million annually from the streaming site—Borchetta said in a Time magazine interview that Swift was paid a total of US$500,000 over the previous 12 months. Spotify responded to Borchetta, by clarifying that Swift had been paid US$2 million for global streaming over the year-long time frame. Spotify further explained: "We [Spotify] paid Taylor [Swift]'s label and publisher roughly half a million dollars in the month before she took her catalog down". According to Borchetta, the amount Swift earned from streaming her music videos on the Vevo site was greater than the payout she received from Spotify.

Borchetta then clarified in a February 2015 interview that Swift's catalog would be permitted on a streaming service "that understands the different needs that we [Swift and Big Machine] have," whereby "the choice to be [on the free, ad-supported tier] or not" is provided. Borchetta argued that Swift's musical oeuvre is "arguably the most important current catalog there is" and stated that the streaming issue is "about each individual artist, and the real mission here is to bring ... attention to it."

Taylor Swift's catalog returned to Spotify in June 2017.

=== Acquisitions and Borchetta's independence ===
In October 2018, Big Machine was placed for sale, with bids from Macquarie Group, Evan Spiegel and Universal Music Group. Big Machine was valued at $300 million. On June 30, 2019, Billboard reported that Scooter Braun's Ithaca Holdings had purchased Big Machine Records for $300 million, with funding from Carlyle Group. A few hours after the announcement of the purchase, Taylor Swift wrote on Tumblr that she was unaware of the buyer of the masters of her first six albums. Later that night, Scott Borchetta revealed through the Big Machine Label Group website his and Swift's conversation regarding the purchase.

A copyright issue arose later in the year just ahead of Swift's American Music Awards' Artist of the Decade performance when Swift tweeted regarding Big Machine's prohibition on the use of her old music. On August 22, 2019, Swift announced on Good Morning America that she would rerecord her first six albums in November 2020 and release them through Republic Records. On November 16, 2020, Variety reported that Big Machine had sold the rights to Taylor Swift's first six albums to Shamrock Holdings. Swift stated that she had not been contacted about the sale. On February 11, 2021, Swift announced that the first rerecorded song, "Love Story (Taylor's Version)", would be released the following day at midnight, which was then followed by the album Fearless (Taylor's Version) on April 9. Swift announced the next re-recorded album to be released, originally slated for a November 19 release then changed to a November 12 release date, would be Red (Taylor's Version), on June 18. Following the release of her tenth studio album, Midnights, Swift announced her third rerecorded album, Speak Now (Taylor's Version) at her Nashville show of her Eras Tour, and released it on July 7, 2023, under Republic Records. She announced her fourth re-recorded album, 1989 (Taylor's Version) at the final US show of the Eras Tour, and released it on October 27, 2023.

On April 2, 2021, it was announced that Ithaca Holdings, including Big Machine, would be sold to the South Korean music and entertainment firm HYBE Corporation, with Borchetta to remain CEO of Big Machine.

On February 12, 2026, Scott Borchetta decided to end his corporate tenure with HYBE to return to being an independent entrepreneur. Upon his departure, Borchetta took a select group of roster artists, along with the exclusive rights to the Big Machine Records name and logo. On the other hand, HYBE retained all physical infrastructure, the publishing company, and the vast majority of the artist roster. Unable to use the original trademark, this HYBE division was renamed Blue Highway Records. Additionally, HYBE maintained the lucrative distribution deals with Universal Music Group, a channel through which Borchetta's new independent label will also temporarily be distributed.

== Imprints ==
Big Machine Label Group, LLC
- Type: Private
- Industry: Music & entertainment
- Founded: September 1, 2005; 21 years ago
- Founder: Scott Borchetta
- Headquarters: Music Row, Nashville, Tennessee, United States
- Key people: Scott Borchetta (CEO); Sandi Spika Borchetta (VP Creative Services); Andrew Kautz, General Manager
- Divisions: Big Machine Records
- Website: bigmachinelabelgroup.com

=== The Valory Music Co. ===
In November 2007, Big Machine Records founded a subsidiary imprint called Valory Music Co. Acts signed to this roster include Jimmy Wayne (who was formerly signed to Big Machine), Jewel, the Mavericks, Thomas Rhett, and Justin Moore.

By the end of November 2008, the Valory imprint entered into a partnership with Midas Records—promotion, sales, marketing, production, publicity and distribution—for Canadian acts Adam Gregory and Emerson Drive. The announcement that Reba McEntire would join Valory was also publicized in November 2008. McEntire's debut single on Valory was scheduled for 2009, with her new studio album scheduled for mid-2009.

Following the acquisition by HYBE America in 2021, The Valory Music Co. established itself as the group's most stable and lucrative pillar in country music sales, successfully managing releases for established superstars like Thomas Rhett, Justin Moore, and Brantley Gilbert, alongside driving the career of Carly Pearce. However, in February 2026, following Scott Borchetta's departure, HYBE completely restructured its Nashville division, resulting in the Valory imprint being officially dissolved and folded into the new flagship label, Blue Highway Records, under the leadership of its new CEO, Jake Basden.

=== Nashville Harbor Records & Entertainment ===
Big Machine joined with Universal Republic Records in June 2009 to found a new label, Republic Nashville. In August 2016, Republic Nashville was rebranded as BMLG Records after Big Machine took back full ownership of the label. BMLG Records rebranded as Nashville Harbor Records & Entertainment in 2024. Following the acquisition by HYBE America in 2021, the label strongly propelled Riley Green's career and managed the releases of artists such as The Band Perry. In February 2026, after Scott Borchetta's departure, all of the label's music came under the primary supervision and distribution of Blue Highway Records (the new Nashville division created by HYBE under the leadership of its new CEO, Jake Basden).

=== Dot Records ===
In March 2014, Big Machine announced the revival of Dot Records and, as of February 2015, the imprint was run in partnership with Republic Records. Dot was shuttered in March 2017 and a number of its artists moved to other Big Machine imprints.

=== Nash Icon Records ===
In 2014, Big Machine announced a partnership with Cumulus Media to create Nash Icon Music, a Big Machine imprint serving as an offshoot of Cumulus's Nash FM brand, focusing on active country acts who achieved mainstream fame in the 1990s and early 2000s. Cumulus also operates Nash Icon-branded radio stations with a similar focus.

On October 21, 2014, it was announced that McEntire would be the first artist signed to Nash Icon Music. Nash Icon Records folded into Big Machine Records in 2018.

== Big Machine Records artists ==
=== Current artists ===
- Naomi Carman
- Mackenzie Carpenter
- Cole Goodwin
- Aaron Lewis
- Rascal Flatts

=== Former artists ===
- Kristian Bush
- Tucker Beathard
- Danielle Bradbery (returned to Big Machine in 2020)
- Garth Brooks (Big Machine/Pearl)
- The Cadillac Three
- Callista Clark
- Daughtry
- Jackson Dean
- Dusty Drake
- Edens Edge
- Mae Estes
- Adam Gregory (Big Machine/Midas/Open Road)
- Trent Harmon
- Ray Wylie Hubbard
- Ryan Hurd
- Jack Ingram
- Lauren Jenkins
- Kate & Kacey
- Brian Kelley
- Lady A
- Chase McDaniel
- Reba McEntire
- Tim McGraw
- Midland
- Mötley Crüe
- Jennifer Nettles
- Todd O'Neill (Nash Next)
- Carly Pearce
- Danielle Peck
- Melissa Peterman (Comedy Artist)
- Noah Schnacky
- Payton Smith
- Something Out West
- Steel Magnolia
- Sugarland
- Sunny Sweeney (moved to Republic)
- Taylor Swift (moved to Republic)
- Waterloo Revival
- Jimmy Wayne (moved to Valory)
- Trisha Yearwood

=== Former Nash Icon Records artists ===
- Breaking Southwest
- Reba McEntire (moved to Big Machine)
- Ronnie Dunn (moved to Big Machine)
- Martina McBride
- Hank Williams Jr.

== Nashville Harbor Records artists ==
- The Band Perry
- Riley Green
- Greylan James
- Caroline Jones

=== Former artists ===
- Greg Bates
- Laci Kaye Booth
- Eli Young Band (moved to Valory)
- Fast Ryde
- Florida Georgia Line
- Ryan Follese
- Noah Hicks
- Chris Janson
- Lady A
- Jaron and the Long Road to Love
- Jackie Lee
- Martina McBride (moved to Nash Icon)
- Cassadee Pope
- Shane Profitt
- Shaylen
- SHEL
- Dallas Smith
- Sunny Sweeney
- A Thousand Horses
- Drake White
- Brett Young

=== Former Dot Records artists ===
- Tucker Beathard (moved to Big Machine)
- Craig Wayne Boyd
- Ashley Campbell
- Aaron Lewis (moved to Valory)
- Maddie & Tae
- Carly Pearce (moved to Big Machine)
- Drake White (moved to BMLG)
- Steven Tyler
- The Shires
- Zac Brown Band (Southern Ground Artist's/Republic Records/John Varvatos Records)

== Valory Music Co. roster ==
=== Former Artists ===
- Braedon Barnhill
- Mackenzie Carpenter
- Preston Cooper
- Sheryl Crow
- Delta Rae
- Eli Young Band
- Emerson Drive (Valory/Midas/Open Road)
- Brantley Gilbert
- Jewel
- Tiera Kennedy
- Kidd G (also with Geffen Records)
- Aaron Lewis
- The Mavericks
- Reba McEntire (moved to Nash Icon)
- Justin Moore
- RaeLynn
- Thomas Rhett
- Tyler Rich
- Heath Sanders
- Conner Smith
- Tara Thompson
- Jimmy Wayne

== Big Machine/John Varvatos Records ==
Founded in 2014 originally as a joint venture between John Varvatos and Universal Music Group's Republic Records label, it became a division of the Big Machine Label Group under its current name in 2018.

- Badflower (Big Machine/John Varvatos Records)
- Ayron Jones (Big Machine/John Varvatos Records)
- The Struts

=== Former pop artists ===
- MacKenzie Bourg
- Cheap Trick
- Nick Fradiani
- Gunnar Gehl
- Laura Marano
- La'Porsha Renae (Big Machine/Motown Records)
- Who Is Fancy

== See also ==
- Big Machine Racing
- List of record labels
