= Ghost city (disambiguation) =

A ghost town or ghost city is a city that has been abandoned.

Ghost city may also refer to:

- Fengdu Ghost City, a complex of shrines, temples and monasteries in Fengdu County, Chongqing, China
- Ghost City, a 1932 film starring Bill Cody
- The Ghost City, a 1923 film serial by Jay Marchant
- Underoccupied developments in China, often referred to as "ghost cities"

== See also ==
- Ghost town (disambiguation)
