= Payton Smith =

American singer-songwriter (born 2000)

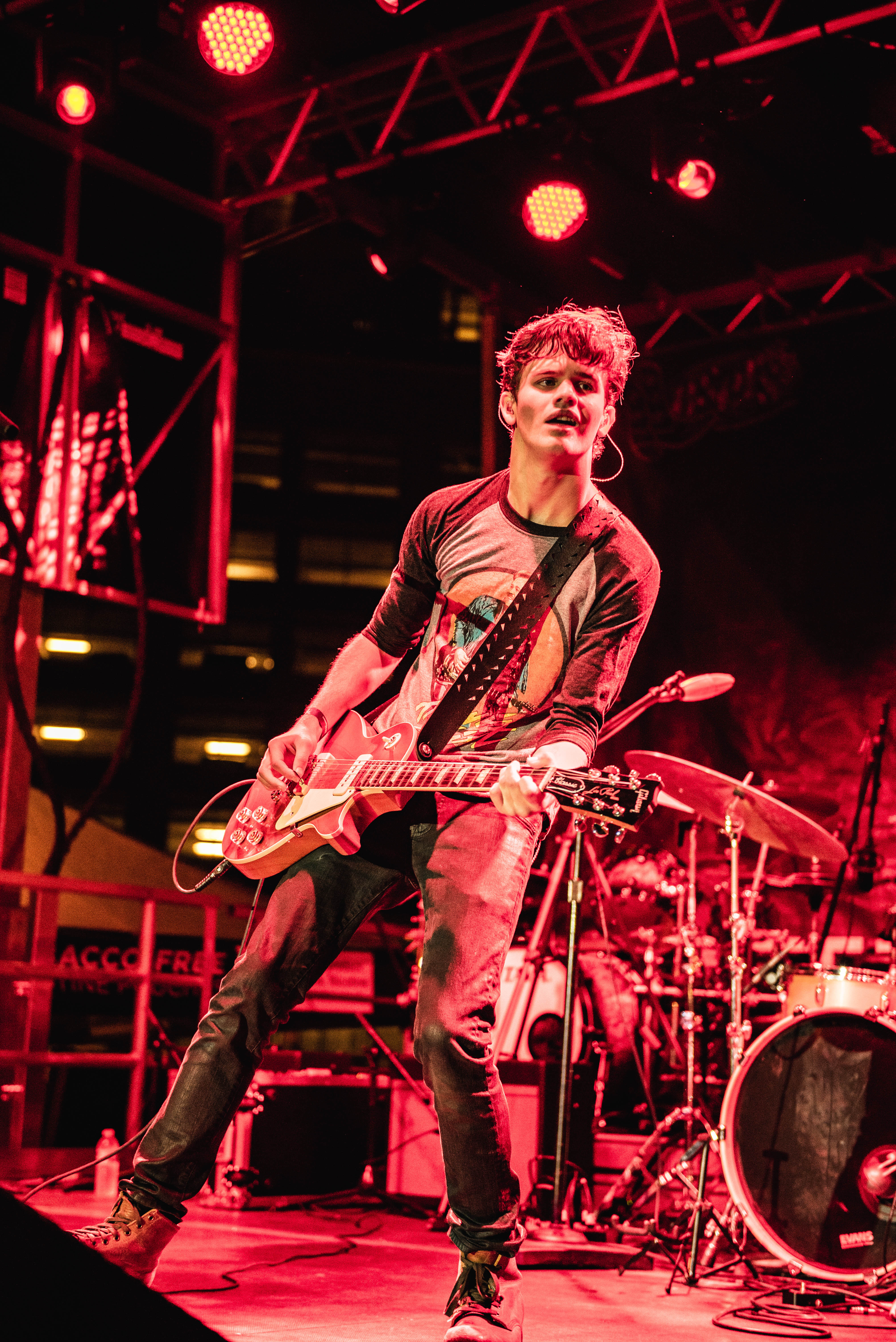

Background information
- Born: January 26, 2000 (age 25); Houma, Louisiana, US
- Genres: Country, rock, country rock, Americana
- Occupation(s): Singer, songwriter
- Instrument(s): Vocals, guitar, banjo, mandolin
- Labels: Big Machine Label Group (2018–present)
- Website: paytonsmith.com

Payton Smith (born January 26, 2000) is an American singer-songwriter.

== Early life ==
The eldest of four boys, Payton Smith was born in Beaumont, Texas and raised in Houma, Louisiana. He cites growing up so close to New Orleans and its music scene and his mother's love of 90s country music as key influences on his songwriting style. With an intrinsic passion for music, Smith describes being 5 years old and watching Keith Urban's performance on the CMA Awards as being the moment he knew he wanted to be a performer with his own unique style of country music. At the age of 10, he received his first guitar from his father, and over the next four years, Smith taught himself to play and began to write his own songs. By the time he was 14, his skills had progressed so much that when his family took a vacation to Nashville, he had his sights set on the Bluebird Cafe's open mic night, only to find it was closed for a holiday. Undeterred, Smith took his guitar to the lobby of the hotel they were staying and played an impromptu set that was heard by a session player who introduced the young songwriter to producer Buddy Cannon. Cannon instantly saw the potential in Smith, and Smith's family soon relocated to Nashville where he pursued his dream while finishing high school.

== Career ==
After Smith moved to Nashville, Cannon began to introduce him to many accomplished Nashville-based songwriters, including Jim McCormick, Ronnie Bowman, Marla Cannon-Goodman, and Larry McCoy. Through learning from and working with these writers, Smith cultivated a catalogue of more than 500 songs. Cannon also connected him with Clay Bradley, then a Vice President at BMI, who in 2017 would co-found the artist development and music publishing company, Eclipse Music Group, where Smith would eventually sign his first publishing agreement in 2018.

Shortly after signing with Eclipse, he was invited to play at the BMI stage at Hard Rock Cafe at CMA Fest. The performance caught the attention of Big Machine Label Group CEO, Scott Borchetta, who was walking by but was struck by Smith's talent and "stopped in his tracks" to watch the set." Borchetta requested that Smith send him a few demos, and was so impressed by them that he offered Smith a record deal.

Smith released his self-titled debut EP with Nashville Harbor (formerly BMLG) on October 4, 2019, and charted in the top 20 on Apple Music in the first day. On March 9, 2020, his single "Like I Knew You Would" was released to country radio.

In January 2020, CMT's annual Listen Up campaign selected Smith as one of 17 promising new artists to watch.

At 20, Smith has shared the stage with acts such as Brad Paisley, Florida Georgia Line and Lady Antebellum. He made his Grand Ole Opry debut on February 23, 2020.

Until restrictions on public gatherings were put in place due to COVID-19, Smith was slated to join Scotty McCreery on Chris Young's 2020 Town Ain't Big Enough tour. Smith has been sheltering-in-place in Nashville, writing new music and participating in various live-streams.

== Artistry ==
Smith's goal is to create a unique brand of country music that draws from a multitude of styles from 90s country to classic rock to the music scene of New Orleans. By blending these styles and infusing traditional country themes with contemporary sensibilities, Smith hopes to bring a new audience to country music. Calling himself part of the "Spotify generation", he believes his peers have musical tastes that are eclectic and varied due to being able to easily access a large portfolio of diverse sounds. Smith has expressed the belief that making a human connection through music transcends genre.

Smith approaches songwriting as though he's telling a story, and writes with the narrative of a music video in mind. Drawing from his own life experience and blending honesty with a sense of humor he describes as "quirky", Smith's lyricism is often praised for conveying a maturity beyond his years.

A self taught musician, Smith often plays every guitar on his tracks. In addition to acoustic and electric guitar, Smith's self-titled EP features him on the banjo and mandolin.

Inspirations for Smith include Pearl Jam, John Mayer, Clint Black, and George Strait. Billboard has compared Smith to a mid-2000s era Keith Urban.

== Discography ==
=== Extended plays ===
Title	Details
Payton Smith	Release Date: October 4, 2019; Label: Nashville Harbor Records & Entertainment

=== Singles ===
Year	Single	Peak chart positions	Album
Year	Single	US Country Airplay	Album
2020	"Like I Knew You Would"	57	Payton Smith
