= Todd O'Neill =

American singer-songwriter

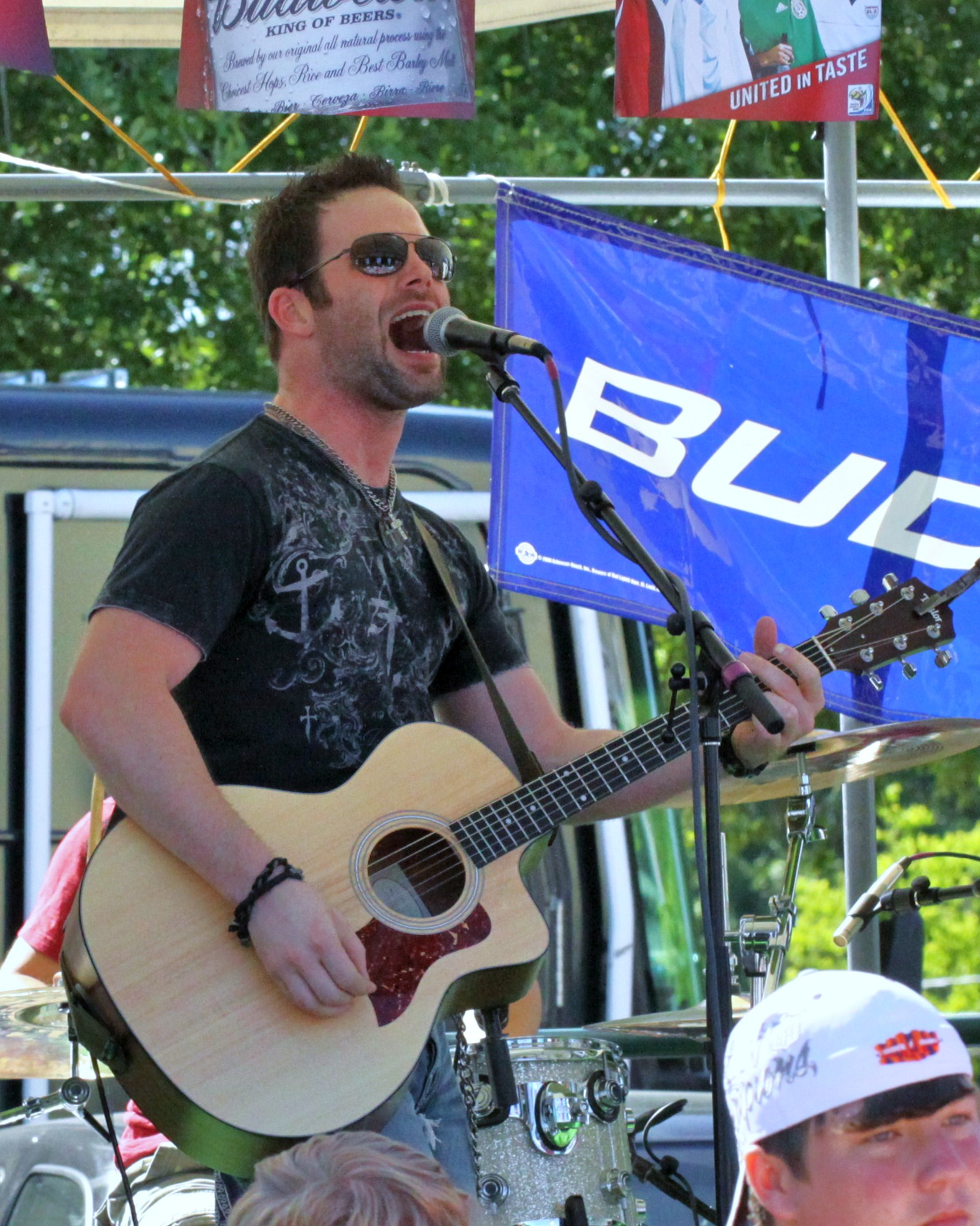
- O'Neill performing in 2010

Background information
- Born: 1982 (age 42–43); Hammond, Louisiana, U.S.
- Origin: Nashville, Tennessee, U.S.
- Genres: Country
- Occupation: Singer
- Instrument: vocals
- Years active: 2017-present
- Labels: Nash Next

Todd O'Neill (born 1982) is an American country music singer. In 2017, he charted at number 37 on Billboard Country Airplay with "Love Again".

== Biography ==
Todd O'Neill was born in 1982 in Hammond, Louisiana. He grew up listening to country music and Cajun music, and first performed in a band called Big Cat Daddy as a teenager. In 2009, he released his first album, Real Life, on the Aria label. After releasing more independent material, he entered the Nash Next 2016 Challenge, a talent show in which Jay DeMarcus (of Rascal Flatts) and Kix Brooks (of Brooks & Dunn) were judges. After winning the competition, he was signed to Big Machine Records' Nash imprint and released his debut single "Love Again". Brett Young, also a Big Machine Records artist, co-wrote the song and originally intended to record it himself until O'Neill met Young at a concert and asked permission to record it. Released to country radio in 2017, "Love Again" peaked at number 37 on the Billboard Country Airplay chart. O'Neill also toured with Brothers Osborne and Runaway June to promote the single. Despite this song's chart success, O'Neill was dropped when Big Machine closed the Nash imprint.

== Discography ==
List of singles, with selected chart positions
Title	Year	Peak positions
Title	Year	US Country Airplay
"Love Again"	2017	37
