= Douglas Anne Munson =

American novelist

- Born: February 17, 1948; Crossville, Tennessee, U.S.
- Died: December 22, 2003 (aged 55); Norwalk, Connecticut, U.S.
- Occupations: Attorney; teacher; novelist
- Writing career
- Pen name: Mercedes Lambert

Douglas Anne Munson (February 17, 1948 – December 22, 2003) was an attorney, teacher, and author of four critically acclaimed novels. She published three of those novels under the pseudonym of Mercedes Lambert.

== Early life and education ==
Douglas Anne Munson was born in Crossville, Tennessee on February 17, 1948. She was named Douglas by her father in honor of his brother Douglas, who died in World War II.

As the daughter of a newspaperman, Douglas's childhood was spent moving from town to town before her family finally settled in southern California. Douglas attended the University of New Mexico, where she majored in Latin American studies, and lived for a year in Ecuador.

== Career ==
=== Legal career ===
After attending law school at UCLA, Douglas became an attorney in the Los Angeles criminal courts. Most of her legal career was spent in dependency court. Dependency court is where children who have been removed from their parent's custody because of severe abuse, neglect or abandonment move through the legal system. It's a niche of the judicial system with a high burn-out rate.

In 1990, Douglas published a novel called El Niño with Viking Press. The book was well received by critics and Douglas went on to publish two mystery novels with Vikingunder the name of Mercedes Lambert, Dogtown in 1991 and Soultown in 1996. These books feature two women detectives: Whitney Logan, fresh out of law school, and Lupe Ramos, a chicana prostitute. Drawn into webs of corruption and deceit, Whitney and Lupe move through the multicultural landscape of southern California. Their relationship underlines the cultural friction in Los Angeles at the end of the 20th century.

Los Angeles is the greatest city for crime fiction because of all the conflicts and potential for conflict. We start out on a precarious footing, trembling on the brink of natural disaster. Then we take hundreds of thousands of people who didn't get along in their countries of origin, add that to an entrenched, angry and frightened group of people who don't want them here, throw in a Santa Ana, a few random insane murderers and pedophiles and then turn the whole thing over to studio executives and the LAPD. It's like a woman with bad skin piling on a lot of makeup. Things are going to get ugly before the night is over.

— Douglas Anne Munson, Los Angeles magazine, 1996

=== Writing career ===
In the mid-1990s, Douglas had three well-regarded books published. She was teaching creative writing and journaling at UCLA. Los Angeles magazine, in an article on the hottest LA mystery writers, included her in a group composed of Michael Connelly, Walter Mosley, James Ellroy, and Robert Crais. Despite growing recognition and accomplishment, Douglas was struggling to stay afloat. As the caseload in dependency court grew, she became less able to endure the suffering she witnessed daily.

In 1996, Douglas resigned from the courts and quit teaching. She moved briefly to Bainbridge Island in Washington state to complete the third Whitney Logan novel, Ghosttown. During this time she traveled back-and-forth to San Francisco to earn a credential to teach English abroad.

=== Teaching career ===
After completing Ghosttown, Douglas sent it to her agent. She learned a month later the publisher had rejected the book, mainly over creative differences. After trying unsuccessfully to reshape the book into a completely different work, Douglas stopped writing completely and accepted a position in the Czech Republic teaching English to soldiers, missionaries, and mink farmers.

== Later life and death ==
In 2001, Douglas discovered a lump in her breast. She had successfully fought breast cancer while writing El Niño in the late 1980s. Fearing the cancer had returned, Douglas returned to the United States to seek medical treatment in Connecticut. When the tests were conclusive, she was given six months to live. She outlived that prediction, and was able to make one last visit to the Czech Republic in December 2003 before dying on December 22, 2003, at a hospital in Norwalk, Connecticut.

Four years after her death, Ghosttown, the third and final Whitney Logan mystery, found a publisher with Five Star Mystery; in the spring of 2008, the first two Whitney Logan mysteries—Dogtown and Soultown—will be reprinted in a single edition by Stark House.

== Publication history ==
- 2008, Dogtown/Soultown omnibus edition scheduled to be published by Stark House with an introduction by Ken Bruen.
- 2007, Ghosttown scheduled to be published in hardback by Five Star Mystery Press with an introduction by Michael Connelly.
- 1997, Soultown published in paperback by Penguin Books.
- 1996, Soultown published in hardcover by Viking.
- 1994, Contributor to Los Angeles Times feature: "The Writer in the Sun They came, they saw, they wrote. Sometimes they didn't even see; they imagined, and it turned out to be true. A sampler of how various writers have tried to pin L.A. down." (May 29, 1994). Botticelli's Venus (short fiction) published in Tales of the Heart.
- 1992, Dogtown published in paperback by Penguin Books. El Niño published as Hostile Witness in paperback by Pinnacle Books.
- 1991, Dogtown published in paperback in Germany by Ariadne Krimi as Die dunkle Seite der Lichterstadt. Dogtown was also published in hardcover by Viking.
- 1990, El Niño published in hardcover by Viking.
