= Joseph L. Bates =

American merchant

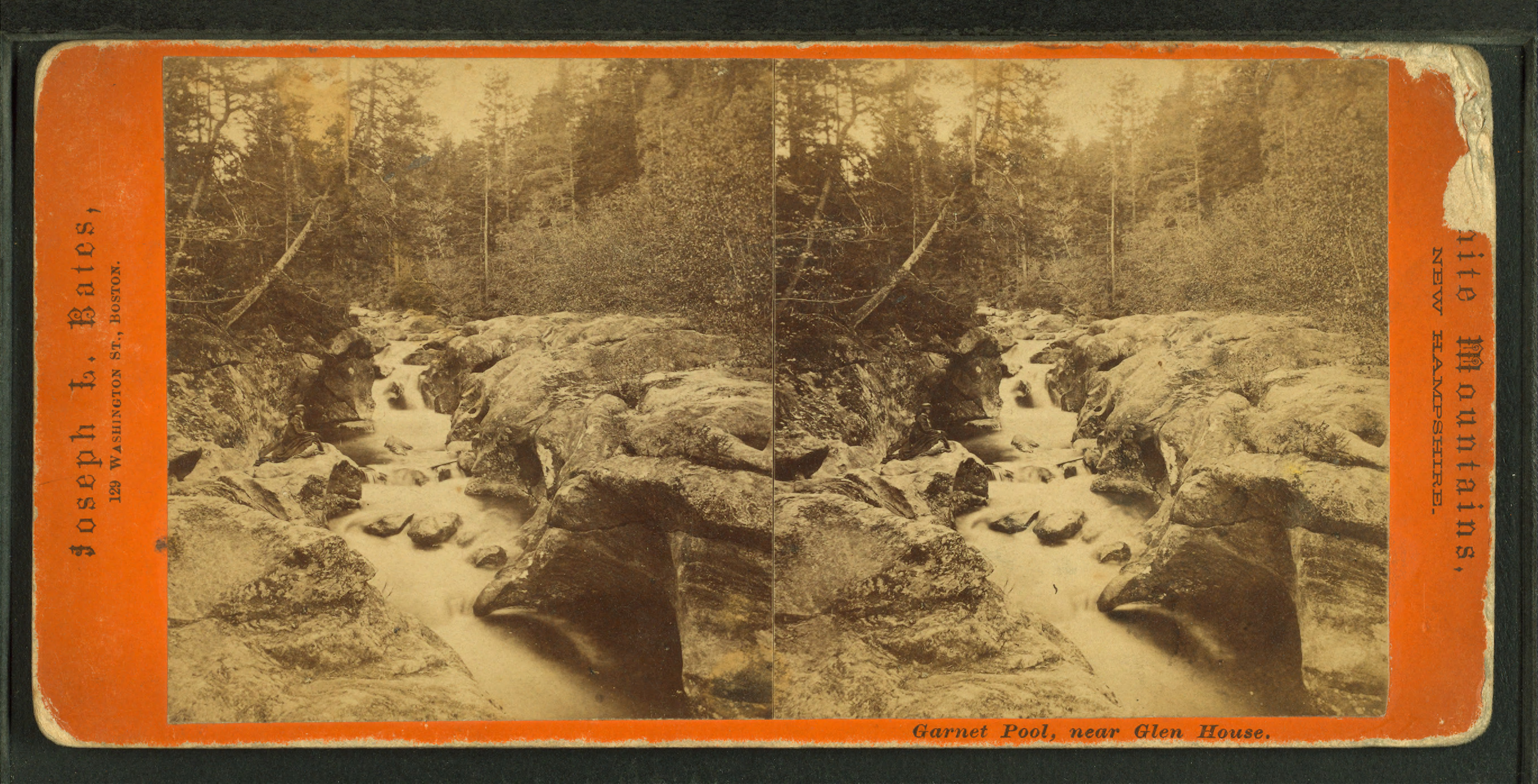
Garnet Pool near Glen House in New Hampshire

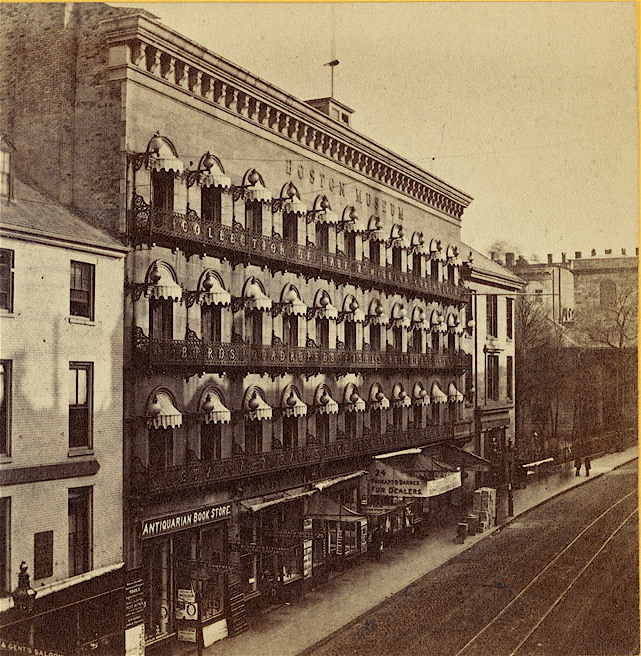
Boston Museum

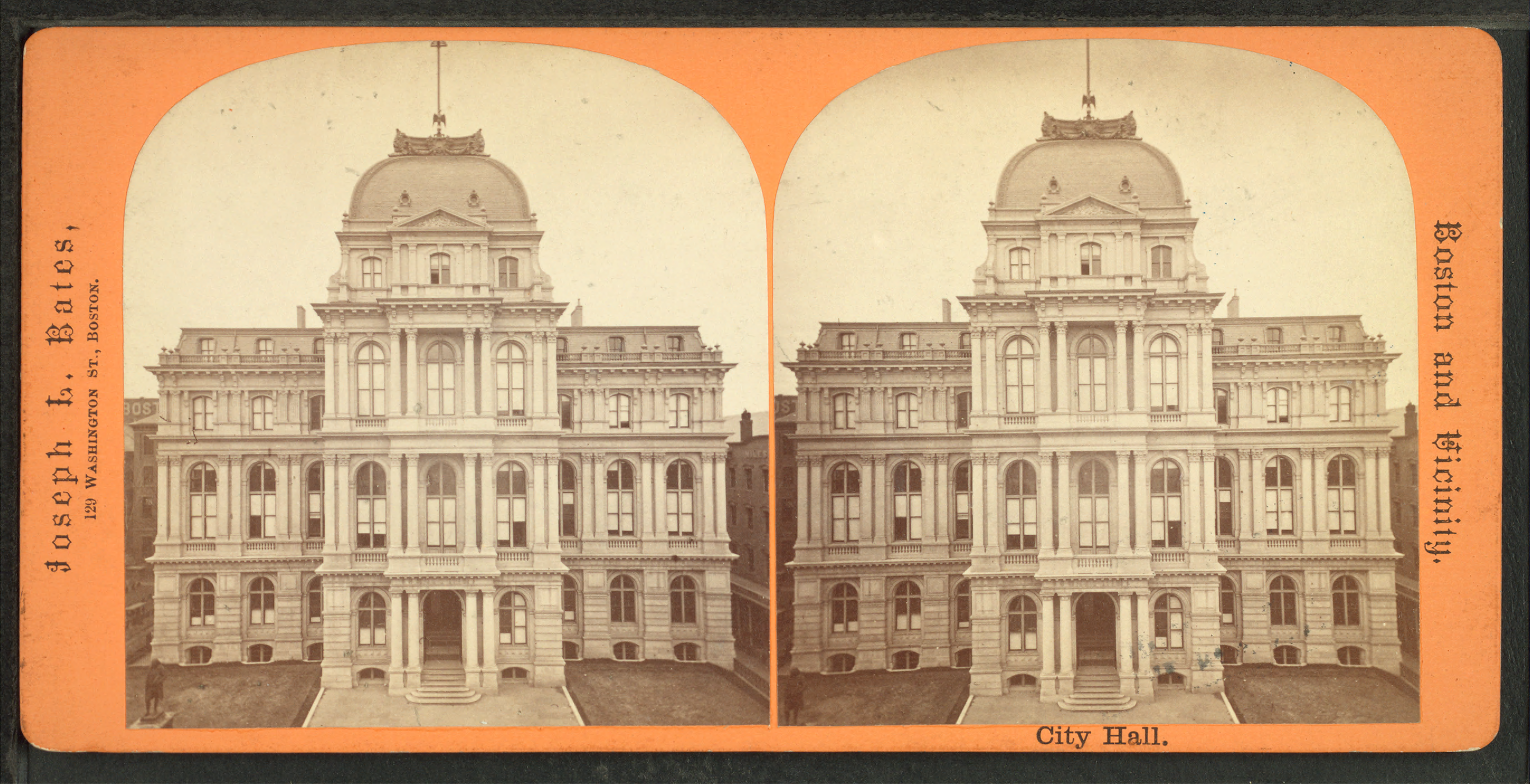
City Hall

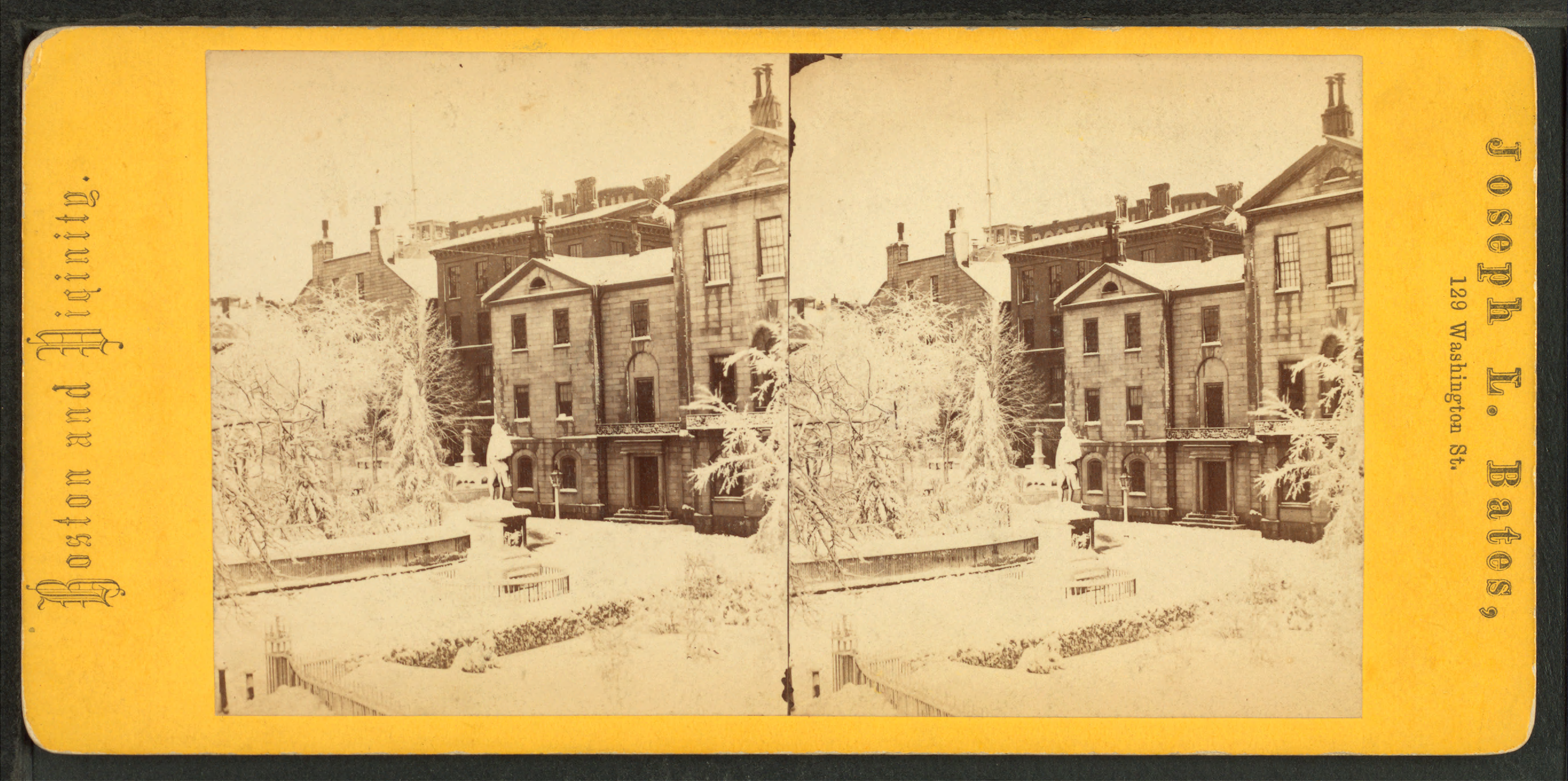
Old City Hall

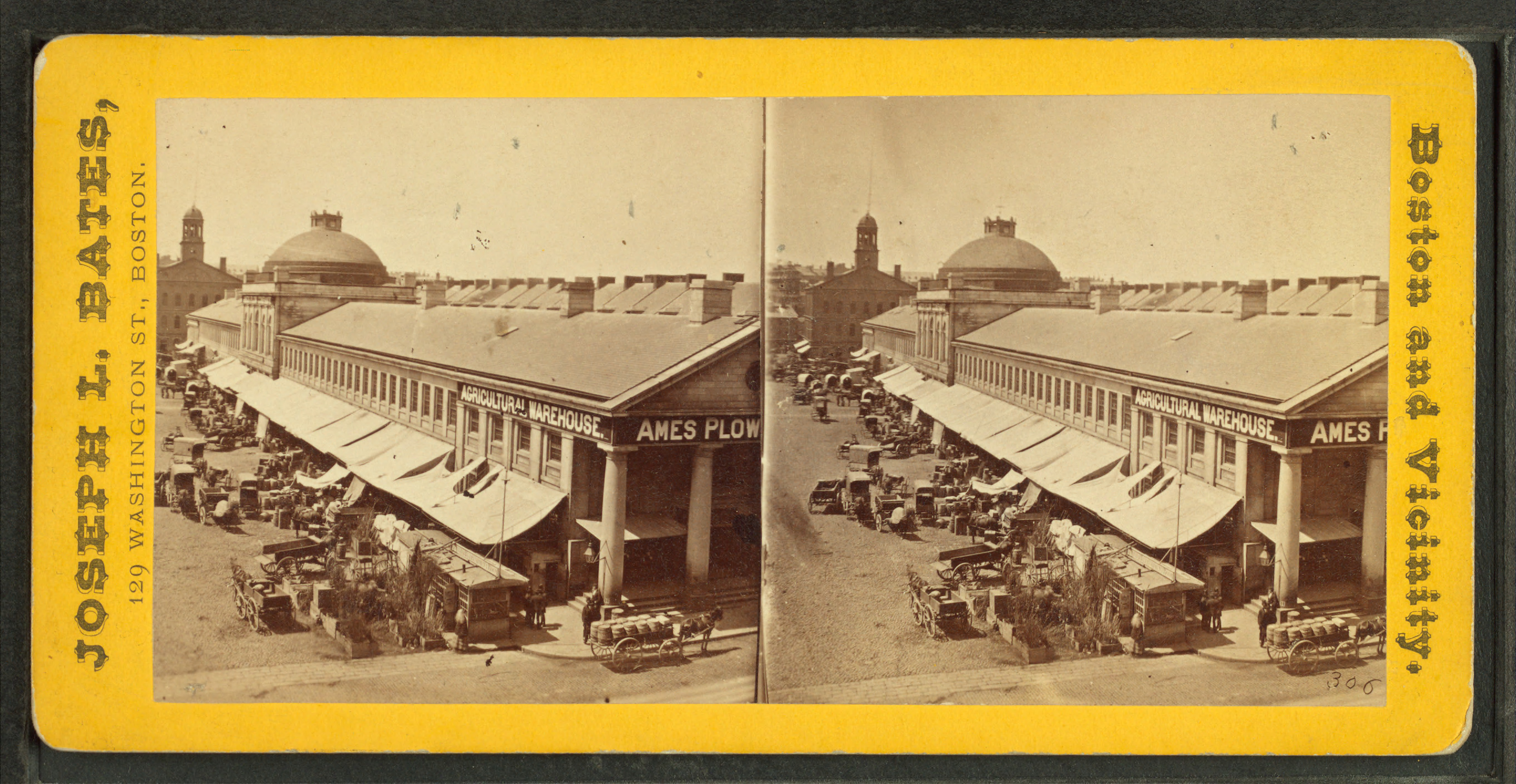
Quincy Market

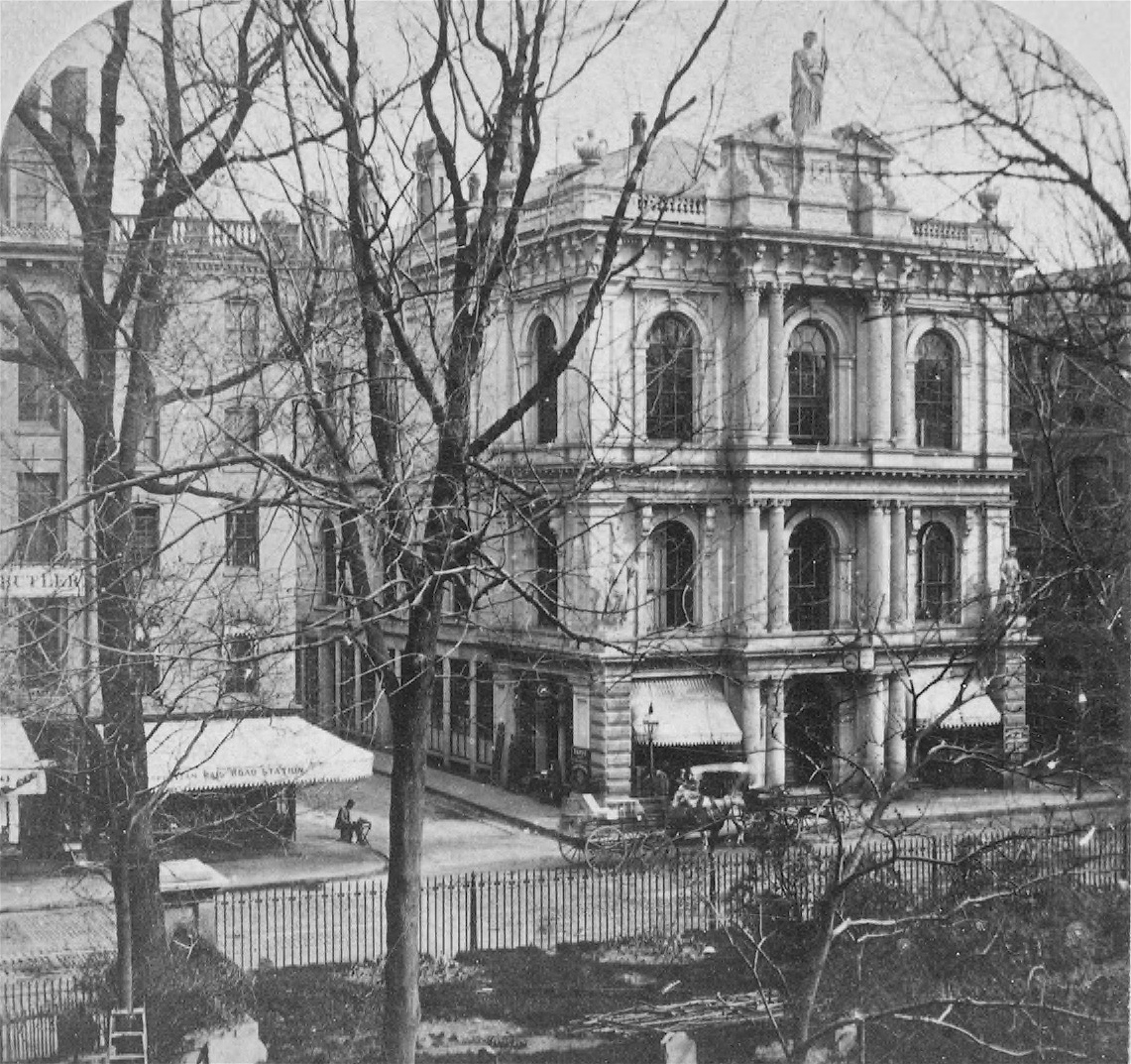
Horticultural Hall

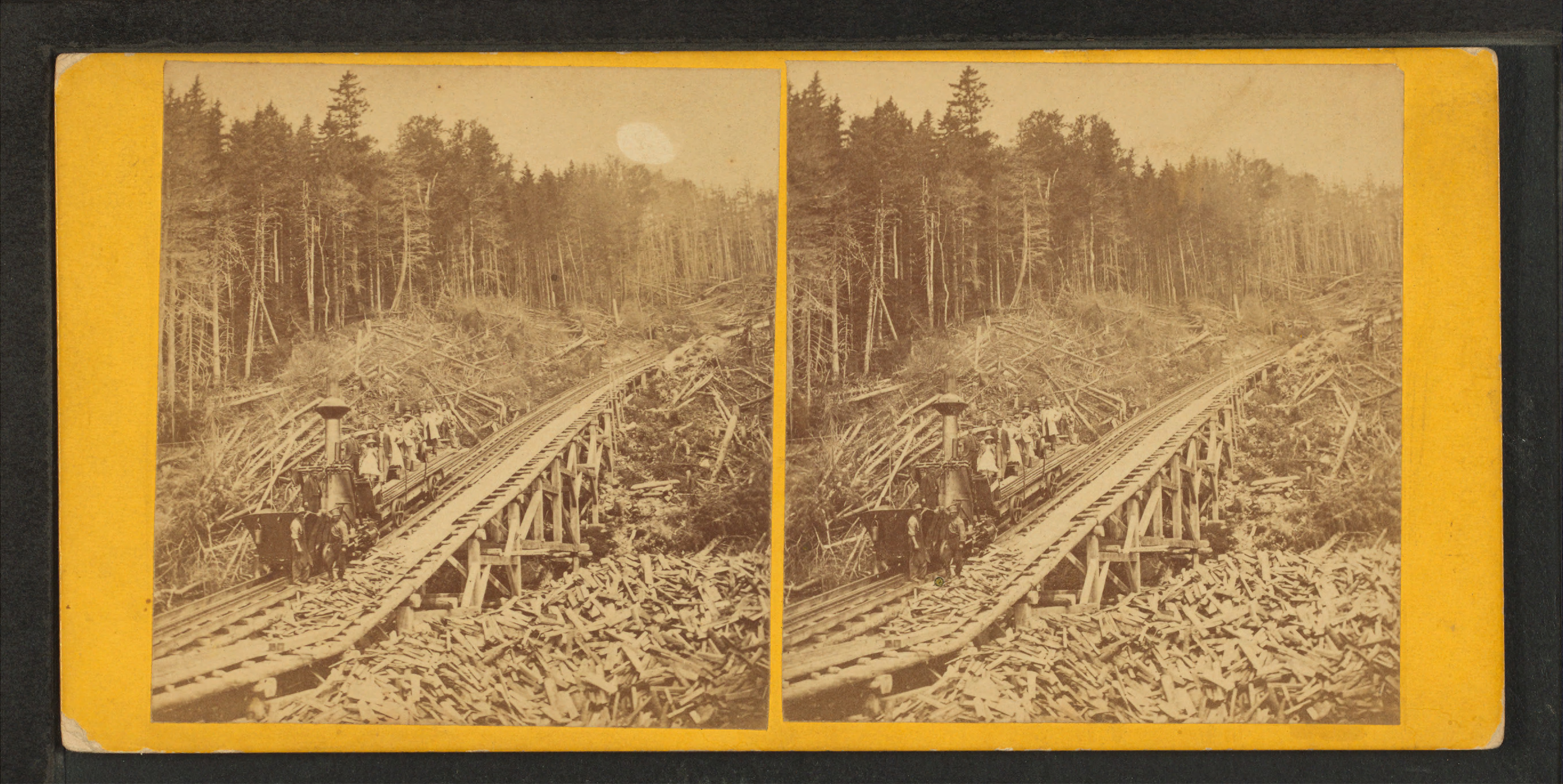
Mount Washington (New Hampshire) cog railroad

Joseph L. Bates (1806 or 1807 – March 2, 1886) was an American merchant and manufacturer based in Boston specializing in musical instruments, umbrellas, stereoscopic photographs and viewers, and fancy goods. Despite being a dealer of stereographic photographs, he was likely not a photographer himself.

== Career ==
Bates began his business in 1828 as a manufacturer of musical instruments at 44 Market St., Boston. The following year he moved to 6 Court Street, by which time he had expanded into the manufacture and repair of umbrellas and parasols.

He published and sold stereoscopic photographs of Boston and New England scenery, landscapes, and buildings. Many are included in the extensive Getty Center photography collection, located in Los Angeles, California.

=== Holmes and Bates stereoscope ===
In 1861, Oliver Wendell Holmes Sr. invented the first handheld stereoscope. Choosing not to patent it, Bates manufactured and sold his design.

== Bibliography ==
- Getty Museum. "Joseph L. Bates". Getty Museum. J. Paul Getty Trust. Archived from the original on 14 September 2023.
- Historic New England. "Advertisement for Joseph L. Bates, musical instruments, umbrellas and parasols, No. 6 Court Street, Boston, Mass., 1829". Historic New England. Historic New England. Archived from the original on 11 September 2023.
- Phillips, Del (2006). "Joseph L. Bates, Boston Merchant". CenturyTel. CenturyTel. Archived from the original on 24 March 2015.
- Stack's Bowers Galleries (April 2019). "1862 Joseph L. Bates. One Cent. HB-49, EP-6a, S-26, Reed-BA01FG. FANCYGOODS. Choice Extremely Fine". Stack's Bowers Galleries. Historic New England. Archived from the original on 12 September 2023.
- Treadwell, T. K.; Darrah, William C. (1994). Photographers of the United States of America (PDF). National Stereoscopic Association. Archived from the original (PDF) on 14 September 2023.
