= Breaking Southwest =

- Origin: Dallas, Texas, U.S.
- Genres: Country
- Years active: 2010-2016
- Label: Nash
- Past members: Kent Bell; Kyle Gaston; Lauren Hall

Breaking Southwest was an American country music group from Dallas, Texas. The group consisted of Kent Bell (lead vocals, guitar), Kyle Gaston (vocals, guitar), and Lauren Hall (vocals, fiddle). After winning a 2015 competition held by Cumulus Media, the group released one single for Big Machine Records' Nash imprint in 2015.

== Musical career ==
Breaking Southwest was founded in 2010 in Dallas, Texas. Vocalists and guitarists Kyle Gaston and Kent Bell met through a mutual friend and began performing together throughout the state, with fiddle player and vocalist Lauren Hall joining them in 2014. A year later, they entered the NASH Next competition, a battle of the bands held by Cumulus Media and Big Machine Records at the former Wildhorse Saloon in Nashville, Tennessee. After winning the competition, the trio was signed to Big Machine's Nash imprint.

Their only release for Nash was "Ghost Town", written by Jonathan Singleton and Josh Thompson and produced by Julian Raymond. The song charted for eight weeks on Billboard Country Airplay, peaking at number 52. They also recorded the track "Rubber on This Road" for the soundtrack of NASCAR '15.
