= To Love Again =

To Love Again may refer to:

== Music ==
- To Love Again (Diana Ross album), 1981
- To Love Again: The Duets, a 2005 album by Chris Botti
- "To Love Again (song)", a 2009 single by Alesha Dixon
- "To Love Again", a 1956 song by The Four Aces
- "To Love Again", a song by Diana Ross from her 1978 album Ross
- "To Love Again", a song by David "Fathead" Newman from the 1982 album Still Hard Times
- "To Love Again", a song by Lara Fabian from the 2000 album Lara Fabian
- "To Love Again", a 2018 song by Jocelyn Enriquez
- "To Love Again", a theme song of the 1956 movie The Eddy Duchin Story, piano orchestral instrumental based on Frédéric Chopin's Nocturne in E-flat major, Op. 9, No. 2, arranged by Carmen Cavallaro

== Other uses ==
- To Love Again (film), a 1971 Japanese film
- To Love Again, a 1981 book by Danielle Steel

== See also ==
- To Live Again (disambiguation)
