= Beacon Street Girls =

Book series by Annie Bryant

The Beacon Street Girls (BSG) is a young adult book series by Annie Bryant, a pseudonym for a group of writers. Addie Swartz created the series, which B*tween Productions initially published and later licensed by Simon & Schuster. Roberta MacPhee edited the series.

== Background ==
Entrepreneur Addie Swartz founded the Beacon Street Girls brand in 2003. It comprised a book series, branded gifts, and a website, all aimed at creating healthier role models and more positive messages for pre-teen girls. The series is designed for girls ages 9–14 and was produced following consultations with experts in different areas of teen research. The books offer an alternative to the perceived prevalence of provocative and objectionable messages in youth culture, especially for "tweens."

The books were initially bundled with bags, backpacks, and accessories and sold as a package. B*tween Productions self-published the series as part of a larger initiative to create a healthy, positive multimedia brand. The books were subsequently licensed to Simon & Schuster in 2007. Initial runs of the series were limited to 5,000-10,000 copies but sold out quickly.

== Reception ==
Community and critical reception to the series have been very positive, with educators praising it for its focus on tackling issues such as cyberbullying, underage drinking, childhood obesity, and responsible weight loss.

A longitudinal study conducted by Duke Medical Center on the influence of reading on weight loss showed that "girls who read the book Charlotte in Paris saw a dip in their BMI scores, but not as much as those who read the book Lake Rescue."

The School Library Journal praised the series, writing that Katani's Jamaican Holiday was "a lively introduction to Jamaica's rich history, culture, and lifestyle."

== Main Characters ==
- Avery Madden: Avery is an energetic, outspoken girl passionate about sports, animal rights, and the environment. She's from Korea; her parents (now divorced) adopted her as a baby and brought her to America. She loves Marty, but sadly she isn't allowed to have any furry pets because her mother is allergic. She has a frog named Frogster and a snake named Walter. She doesn't like being labeled. Avery is tiny and slightly hyper, which is part of her natural love for sports, especially soccer. Avery drives all of her friends crazy, but they love her anyway. She laughs at everything and sometimes speaks without thinking. Avery has two older brothers: Tim and Scott. She is likable and loves the Boston Red Sox, particularly Robbie Flores.
- Charlotte Ramsey: Charlotte loves school and wants to be a writer. She has traveled to many places, including Australia, Tanzania, and Paris. She stargazes and constantly writes in her journal. She hates being onstage or in the spotlight unless she is doing magic. She is very close to her landlady, Miss Pierce, and often visits her for help with schoolwork and to talk about life. Charlotte has lived with her father, a travel writer, since her mother died of pneumonia when she was 4 years old. Charlotte has a crush on Nick Montoya, who also enjoys travel. Charlotte wrote the Tower Rules and is the BSG's secretary.
- Isabel Martinez: Isabel is a Hispanic American girl who moved to Boston so her mother could pursue treatment for multiple sclerosis while her father stayed in Michigan. Isabel is a talented artist and likes basketball. She used to dance ballet, but a knee injury forced her to stop. She is new to Abigail Adams Jr. High and soon became close friends with Maeve and Charlotte. She then joined the BSG, despite Katani and Avery's initial cold reception. Isabel later becomes good friends with Kevin Connors in Just Kidding. She loves to draw birds and submits cartoons to the school newspaper, the Sentinel. She is known as a sweet girl and loves birds, especially her pet parrot, Franco.
- Katani Summers: Also known as K-girl, she loves fashion and is loyal to her friends. Her grandmother is the principal of Abigail Adams Jr. High. Katani has a 14-year-old sister, Kelley, who is mildly autistic and doesn't act her age. Katani is very responsible and seems cold at first but is very kind and caring. Charlotte describes her as "a marshmallow disguised as a cactus." Katani gives style advice to all of the BSG, even Avery, who resists it. She doesn't like singing; she is the most organized of the BSG and adores sewing and horseback riding. She has a tentative relationship with Reggie DeWitt, whom she went to the Valentine's Day Dance with.
- Maeve Kaplan-Taylor: Maeve is an outgoing and bubbly Irish/Jewish girl who wants to be a movie star. Her parents are separated, and she has a younger brother named Sam. She is constantly frustrated with schoolwork because she has dyslexia. She tries her best in school, uses a laptop in class, and meets with a math tutor. She is notably "boy crazy," and her many crushes include Nick Montoya, Dillon Johnson, baseball player Robbie Flores, Chad (Chizzam), Billy Trentini, Apollo, Simon Blackwell, a waiter at Montoya's, her tutor Matt, Kevin Connors, Riley Lee, and Trevor. She loves to command attention and to be center stage, whether she is acting, singing, or dancing. She is consistently disorganized and often recruits her friends' help for her big projects such as Project Thread, which aimed to deliver handmade blankets to the local homeless shelter. In Letters from the Heart, she receives an award for Project Thread.

== Recurring Characters ==
- Marty: Marty is the dog that the BSG finds in a trash can while playing soccer in Worst Enemies/Best Friends. Charlotte hides him in the tower, where her father and landlord eventually find him. He is a main component of Crush Alert and Lucky Charm.
- Nick Montoya: Nick is a kind, popular boy who has a crush on Charlotte and is friends with the BSG. His family owns a local bakery called Montoya's, which the BSG visits frequently. Many girls like him, as he is friendly and good-looking. He forms a travel club with Charlotte and Chelsea. He and Charlotte kiss for the first time on Valentine's Day at night in the falling snow after a dance in Crush Alert.
- Chelsea Briggs: Chelsea is a classmate and friend of the BSG at Abigail Adams Junior High who is overweight but is beginning to lose weight. Her most notable appearance is in Lake Rescue, in which she is described as: "It was almost as if she was invisible, which was odd because Chelsea was so large." A later study proved that Chelsea's size inspired test subjects to lose weight. Later in the series, she becomes good friends with Charlotte and Nick Montoya. She has a passion for photography.
- Betsy Fitzgerald: Betsy is in the same homeroom as the BSG. She is very intelligent and organized, and she always walks briskly, as if late for an appointment. Her dreams include getting into an Ivy League school, preferably Harvard, which her older brother attends. She constantly tries to build an impressive resume. Despite her stress over college, she is friendly but can be a little annoying. She can head anything and was a historical adviser for the movie Pirates of the Cape.
- Anna McMasters: One of the school's "Queens of Mean"; she and her friend Joline are known for their cruelty. She is tall, blond, and wants to be a model. She has a sticker on her locker saying, "It's an inside joke...and you're on the outside!" Anna is good at sports and often plays on the same teams as Avery. Anna doesn't like Kiki very much because Kiki is trying to take away her friendship with Joline.
- Joline Kaminsky: Anna's friend and henchwoman; one of the school's "Queens of Mean". She has a fondness for animals. Joline is very similar to Anna, but she doesn't play any sports.
- Kiki Underwood: Kiki is the school's "Empress of Mean". She is very loving toward her parents, and her famous father has been shown to spoil her, as he offered to make a music video for her talent show act. She enjoys boating and showing off her riches.
- Mrs. Montoya: Nick's mom runs Montoya's Bakery. She is Hispanic and sprinkles Spanish words into her vocabulary like "Hola" and "amigas."
- Happy Lucky Thingy: A pink toy Avery gave to Marty that became his favorite chew toy. Though it is a small cloth toy, it never needs to be replaced and has a place in the hearts of all the BSG.

== Minor Characters ==
- Sophie Morel, Dillon Johnson, Riley Lee, Henry Yurt, Reggie DeWitt, Elena-Maria Martinez, Scott Madden, Tim Madden, Kelley Summers, Patrice Summers, Sam Kaplan-Taylor, Mrs. Ruby Fields, Ms. Rodriguez, Miss Sapphire Pierce, Mrs. Ethel Weiss, Ms. Razzberry Pink, Yuri, LaFanny, Mr. Ross Taylor, Ms. Carol Kaplan, Mr. Richard Ramsey, Mr. Llwelyn Summers, Mrs. Nadine Summers, Mr. Jake Madden, Ms. Elizabeth Madden, Mr. Martinez, Mrs. Martinez.

== Books in the series ==
Main Series:

1): Worst Enemies / Best Friends

2): Bad News / Good News

3): Letters from the Heart

4): Out of Bounds

5): Promises, Promises

6): Lake Rescue

7): Freaked Out

8): Lucky Charm

9): Fashion Frenzy

10): Just Kidding

11): Ghost Town

12): Time’s Up

13): Green Algae and Bubble Gum Wars

14): Crush Alert

15): Scavenger Hunt

16): Sweet Thirteen

Special Adventures:

1): Charlotte in Paris

2): Freestyle with Avery

3): Isabel's Texas Two-Step

4): Katani's Jamaican Holiday

5): Maeve on the Red Carpet

6): Ready! Set! Hawaii!
