= BYF =

BYF could refer to:

- Broughty Ferry railway station, Scotland; National Rail station code BYF
- Boston Youth Fund, providing employment
