= Boston Bar Association =

- Founded: Incorporated 1861
- Type: Bar Association
- Location: Boston, Massachusetts
- Region served: Law
- Website: www.bostonbar.org

The Boston Bar Association (BBA) is a volunteer non-governmental organization in Boston, Massachusetts, United States. With headquarters located at 16 Beacon Street in the historic Chester Harding House, across from the Massachusetts State House on Beacon Hill, the BBA has 13,000 members drawn from private practice, corporations, government agencies, legal aid organizations, the courts and law schools.

The Association traces its origins to the pre-Revolutionary period. The elite of the Boston bar included Jeremiah Gridley, James Otis Jr., Benjamin Pratt, Benjamin Kent, and Oxenbridge Thacher. These elite British lawyers served as the role model for John Adams, the lawyer who provided pro bono representation to the British soldiers prosecuted for the Boston Massacre and went on to become the second president of the United States.

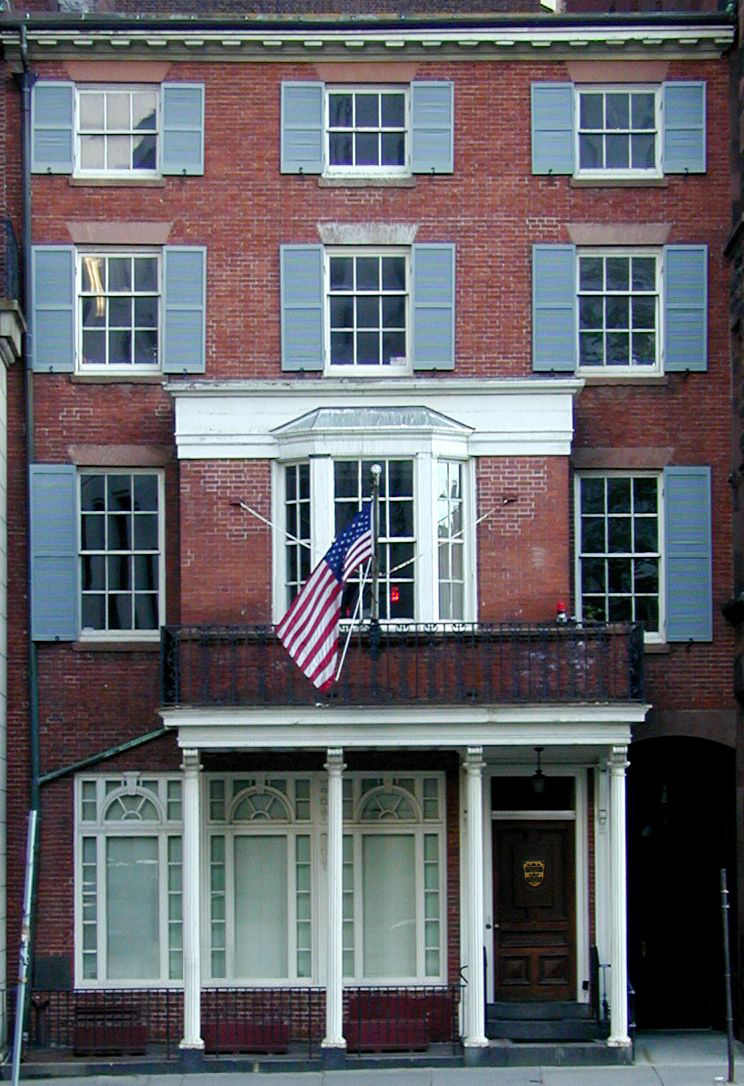
The Chester Harding House, a National Historic Landmark occupied by portrait painter Chester Harding from 1826-1830, now houses the Boston Bar Association.

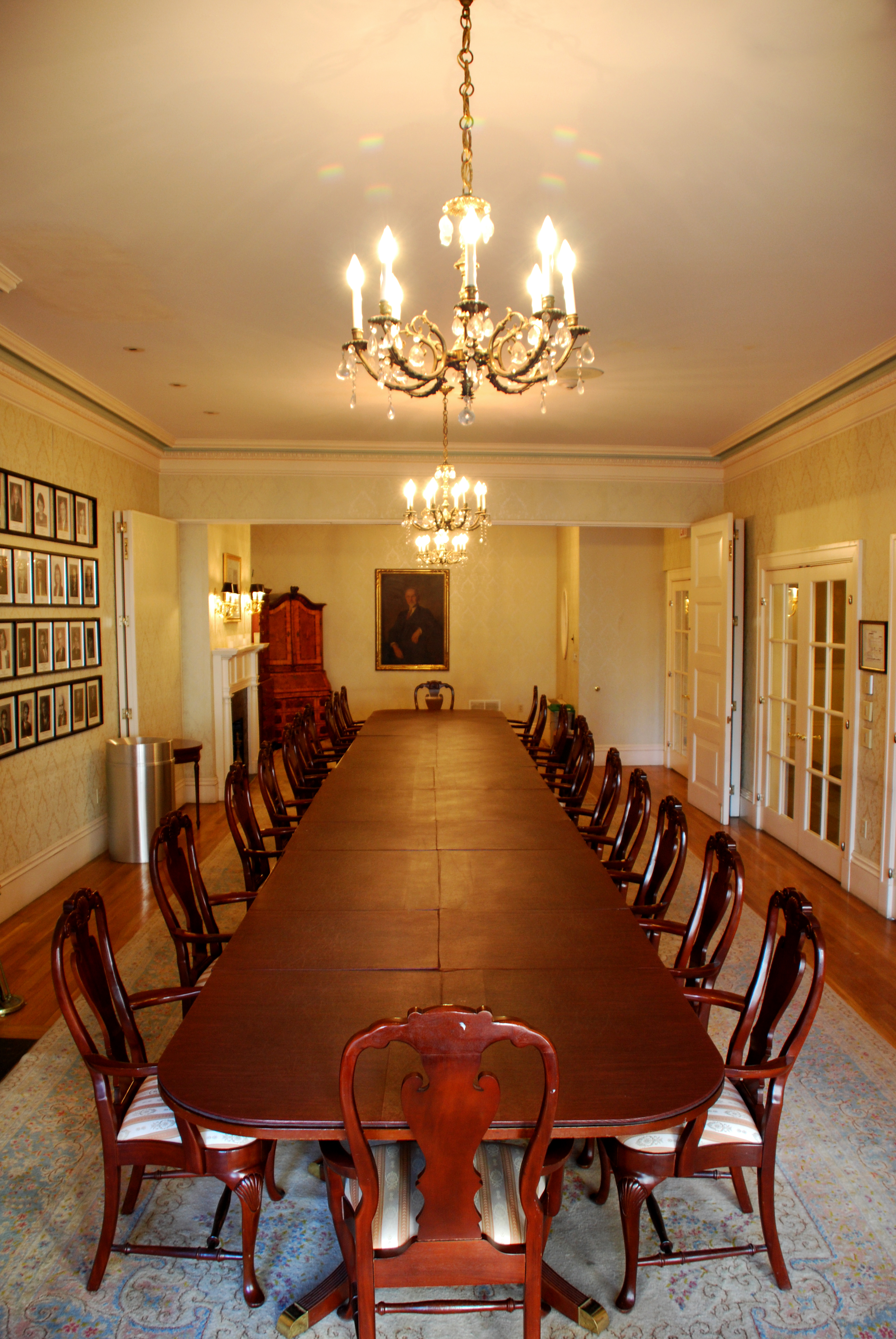
John and Abigail Adams Room

Governed by a Council of 30 members, the Boston Bar Association has 24 sections and more than 100 committees dedicated to substantive areas of law as well as issues such as access to justice and the administration of justice.

== Public policy ==
The Association makes its policy positions known via the filing of amicus briefs, the drafting of legislation and official comments on proposed government actions. Recent public policy positions taken by the Boston Bar Association include:

March 2012: The Boston Bar Association Task Force on the Civil Right to Counsel released "The Importance of Representation in Eviction Cases and Homelessness Prevention which recommended pilot projects to learn more about the mechanisms for providing counsel, the effect of creating a right to counsel, the costs involved, and the potential cost savings to the Commonwealth.

October 2011: The association released the Report of the Boston Bar Association Task Force on the Future of the Profession in response to the 2008 recession and its effects on the legal market.

May 2011: The association released a report, Justice on the Road to Ruin, on the Massachusetts State Trial Court’s state budget. The report states that continued inadequate court funding will inflict pain on real people.

March 2010: The association's Task Force on the FY 2011 Judiciary Budget released their report. The Report warns that further cuts to the Judiciary would have severe consequences for the administration of justice in the Commonwealth.

November 2006: The Boston Bar Association, with the New York City Bar Association, the Beverly Hills Bar Association, the Los Angeles County Bar Association and the Bar Association of San Francisco, filed an amicus brief in American Civil Liberties Union, Et Al. v. National Security Agency, et al., a case now pending before the U.S. Court of Appeals for the Sixth Circuit. The brief urges the Court of Appeals in Cincinnati to affirm a lower court ruling that permanently enjoined the National Security Administration's warrantless surveillance program.

September 2005: The association was one of a number of organizations which signed on to an amicus brief in United States v. Darryl Green. In addition, the BBA drafted a petition to the U.S. District Court for the District of Massachusetts urging the Court to revise its jury plan to remedy the under-representation of minorities in the federal jury pool.

June 2005: The association's President-Elect Edward P. Leibensperger testified before the Massachusetts Legislature's Joint Committee on the Judiciary, urging the defeat of all bills related to reinstating capital punishment in Massachusetts.

September 2002: The association filed an amicus brief in Goodridge v. Department of Public Health in support of gay marriage as a civil rights issue stating that discrimination against gays and lesbians is unacceptable and unconstitutional.

== Periodicals ==
Four times a year (winter, spring, summer, fall) the Boston Bar Association publishes a magazine called the Boston Bar Journal. The Journal is an online publication managed by a volunteer Board of Editors that presents information, analysis, and opinions in articles written by attorneys, judges, and others interested in the development of the law. The Journal is free to all Association members, and available as well to paid subscribers.

The association also publishes BBA Week, a weekly e-newsletter that provides information on pro bono and public service opportunities, updates from law firms and the state and federal courts, previews of upcoming legal education programs and special events, and photo albums.

In addition, the association's Sections and Committees publish online newsletters.

== Public service ==
The Boston Bar Association has established public service programs utilizing lawyer volunteers. Among these programs are:

- The M. Ellen Carpenter Financial Literacy Program - co-sponsored by the U.S. Bankruptcy Court for Massachusetts – designed to teach high school students about budgeting, making sound credit choices and avoiding bankruptcy.
- The Boston Bar Association Summer Jobs Program – conducted in partnership with the Boston Public Schools, the Boston Youth Fund, and the Boston Private Industry Council, it places juniors and seniors from Boston's public high schools in paid summer internships at Boston law firms, corporate law departments, and law-related public agencies.
- The Lawyer-for-the-Day Project at the Boston Housing Court – provides pro bono lawyers to assist unrepresented tenants and landlords on summary process day.
- The Volunteer Lawyers Project of the Boston Bar Association – provides pro bono civil legal assistance to low-income clients.

== Past presidents ==
Notable past presidents include:

- John Adams (1761-1766) – second President of the United States
- Ebenezer R. Hoar (1879) -- United States Attorney General, 1869-1870
- William Gaston (1880-1881) - Governor of Massachusetts, 1875-1876
- Moorfield Storey (1909-1913) – President of the American Bar Association; first President of the National Association for the Advancement of Colored People
- Robert W. Meserve (1963-1965) – President of the American Bar Association
- John G. Brooks (1972-1974) - President of the National Legal Aid & Defender Association and a director of the Legal Services Corporation
- John J. Curtin, Jr. (1979-1981) – President of the American Bar Association
- Gene D. Dahmen (1987-1988) – first woman to serve as President of the Boston Bar Association
- Rudolph F. Pierce (1989-1990) – first African American to serve as President of the Boston Bar Association
- Hon. Sandra L. Lynch (1992-1993) – first woman to serve as chief judge of the United States Court of Appeals for the First Circuit
- Hon. Margaret H. Marshall (1991-1992) – first woman Chief Justice of the Massachusetts Supreme Judicial Court
- Joan A. Lukey (2000-2001) - first woman President of the American College of Trial Lawyers
