= 10th Missouri Infantry Regiment (Union) =

- Active: August 1861 to October 31, 1864
- Country: United States
- Allegiance: Union
- Branch: Infantry
- Engagements: Siege of Corinth; Battle of Iuka; Second Battle of Corinth; Yazoo Pass Expedition; Battle of Port Gibson; Battle of Raymond; Battle of Champion Hill; Siege of Vicksburg, May 19 & May 22 assaults Chattanooga campaign Battle of Missionary Ridge

The 10th Missouri Infantry Regiment was an infantry regiment that served in the Union Army during the American Civil War.

== Service ==
The 10th Missouri Infantry Regiment was organized at St. Louis, Missouri in August 1861 and mustered in for three years service.

The regiment was attached to the Department of the Missouri to May 1862. 2nd Brigade, 3rd Division, Army of the Mississippi, to November 1862. 2nd Brigade, 7th Division, Left Wing, XIII Corps, Department of the Tennessee, to December 1862. 2nd Brigade, 7th Division, XVI Corps, to January 1863. 2nd Brigade, 7th Division, XVII Corps, to September 1863. 2nd Brigade, 2nd Division, XVII Corps, to December 1863. 2nd Brigade, 3rd Division, XV Corps, to October 1864.

Companies A, B, C, D, E, F, and G mustered out of service on August 24, 1864. Because their term of service was not complete, Company H was attached to Company E, 24th Missouri Infantry. Companies I and K mustered out October 31, 1864.

== Detailed service ==
Guarded Pacific Railroad until November 1861. Expedition through Jefferson County September 1–3. Fulton, Mo., October 28. At Hermann, Mo., December 1–23. Expedition through Warren, Callaway, Boone and Audrain Counties December 1861. At Warrenton, Mo., until February 1862. At High Bridge until April. At Cape Girardeau, Mo., until April 30. Moved to Pittsburg Landing, Tenn., April 30. Coffey's Landing, Tenn., May 2. Siege of Corinth, Miss., May 5–30. Action at Farmington May 9 (reserve). Skirmish on Booneville Road May 29. Pursuit to Booneville May 31-June 12. At Corinth until August. At Jacinto until September 18. Battle of Iuka September 19. Battle of Corinth October 3–4. Grant's Central Mississippi Campaign November 1862 to January 1863. Escort train to Memphis, Tenn., December 20–30, 1862. Guard duty on Memphis & Charleston Railroad at Germantown and near Memphis until March 1863. Expedition to Yazoo Pass and operations against Fort Pemberton and Greenwood March 13-April 5. Moved to Milliken's Bend, La., and duty there until April 25. Movement on Bruinsburg, Mississippi and turning Grand Gulf April 25–30. Battle of Port Gibson May 1. Big Black River May 3. Battles of Raymond May 12. Jackson May 14. Champion Hill May 16. Siege of Vicksburg, Miss., May 18-July 4. Assaults on Vicksburg May 19 and 22. Surrender of Vicksburg July 4. Garrison duty at Vicksburg until September 12. At Helena, Ark., until October 1. Moved to Memphis, then marched to Chattanooga, Tenn., October 1-November 22. Operations on Memphis & Charleston Railroad in Alabama October 20–29. Chattanooga-Ringgold Campaign November 23–27. Tunnel Hill November 23–24. Missionary Ridge November 25. At Bridgeport, Ala., until January 1, 1864. At Royd's Station and Brownsboro, Ala., along Memphis & Charleston Railroad until June 15. (Constructed bridge across Flint River at Brownsboro.) Moved to Kingston, Ga., via Huntsville and Stevenson, Ala., June 15–20. Moved to Resaca July 2, and duty there until August 17. (Companies I and K until October.) Defense of Resaca October 12–13 (Companies I and K).

== Casualties ==
The regiment lost a total of 331 men during service; 3 officers and 98 enlisted men killed or mortally wounded, 2 officers and 228 enlisted men died of disease.

== Commanders ==
- Colonel Chester Harding Jr. was the regiment's founding commanding officer. Resigned Dec 1, 1861 to accept appointment as Adjutant General of the State of Missouri.
- Colonel George R. Todd, Dec 1, 1861-Apr 9, 1862
- Colonel Samuel A. Holmes, Apr 9, 1862-Jun 10, 1863 (Resigned)
- Lieutenant Colonel Leonidas Horney - in Acting Command at the battles of Raymond and Champion Hill; killed in action at Champion Hill
- Colonel Francis C. Deimling - Commanded at the battle of Champion Hill after the death of Lt Col Horney and during the siege of Vicksburg while major. Promoted to Colonelcy and command of the regiment, June 10, 1863. Mustered out with the regiment, Aug 24, 1864.
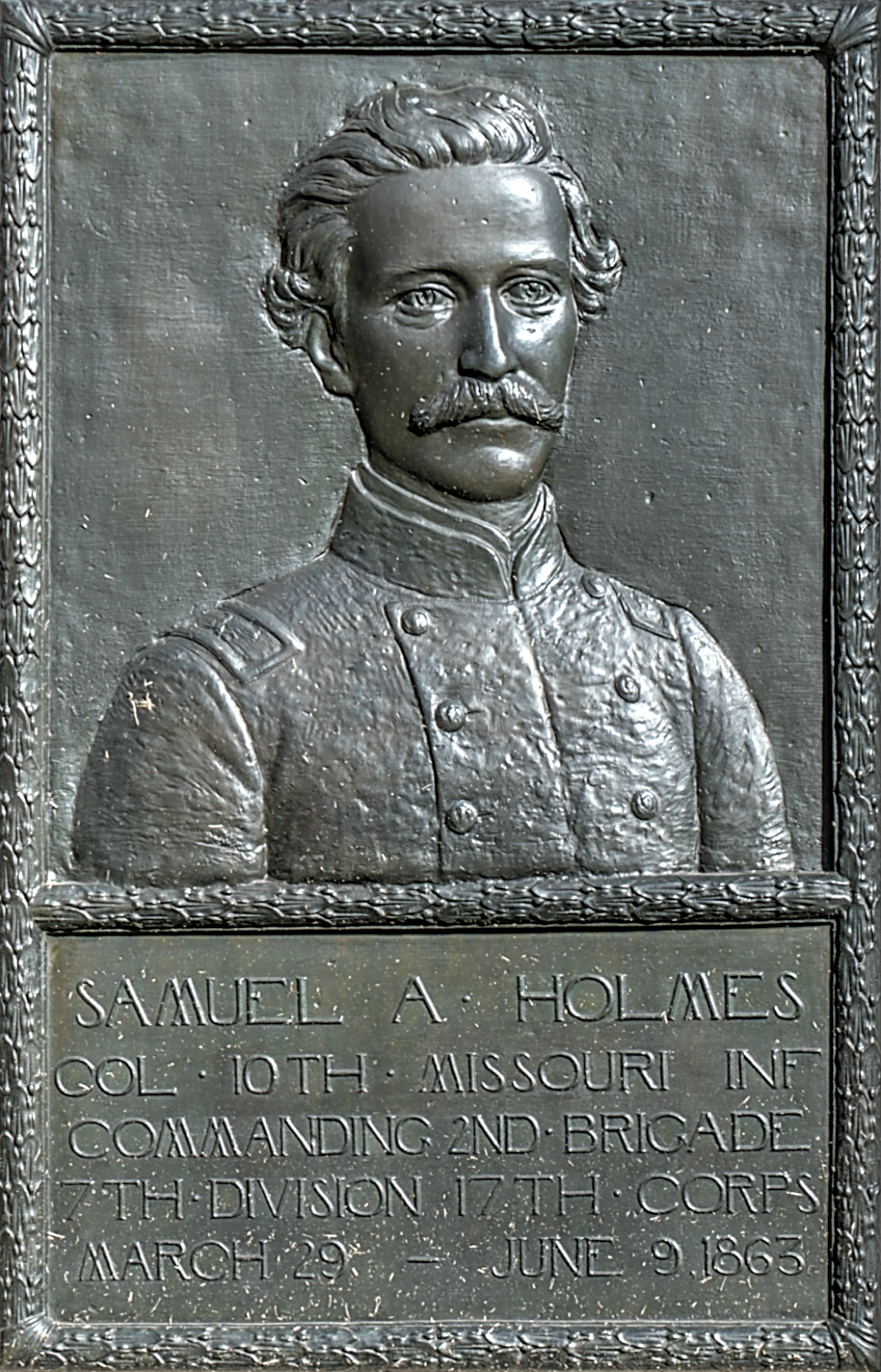
Bronze relief portrait of Colonel Samuel A. Holmes at Vicksburg National Military Park

== See also ==
- Missouri Civil War Union units
- Missouri in the Civil War
