= Chester Harding (painter) =

American painter (1792–1866)

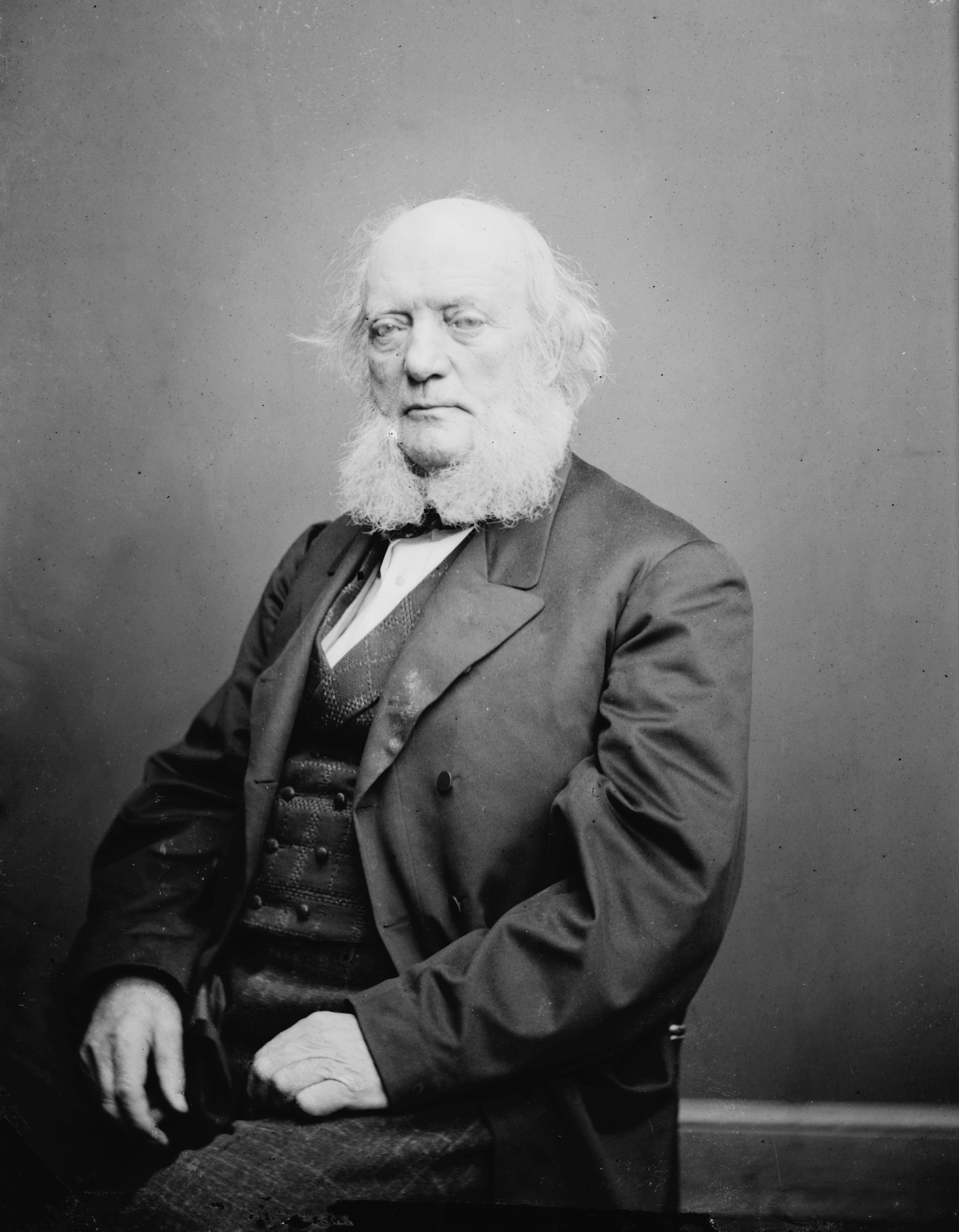
- Harding, c. 1860 – c. 1865
- Born: September 1, 1792; Conway, Massachusetts, U.S.
- Died: April 1, 1866 (aged 73); Boston, Massachusetts, U.S.
- Education: Philadelphia Academy of Design
- Spouse: Caroline Matilda Woodruff (m. 1815; died 1845)
- Children: 9

Chester Harding (September 1, 1792 – April 1, 1866) was an American portrait painter known for his paintings of prominent figures in the United States and England.

== Early life ==
Harding was born in Conway, Massachusetts, on September 1, 1792. He was the fourth of twelve children born to his mother, Olive (née Smith) Harding, and his father, Abiel Harding. He was over 6'3" in height. His family moved to Caledonia, New York, when he was fourteen-years-old. Self-sufficient at a young age, his initial trade was that of a woodturner.

== Career ==
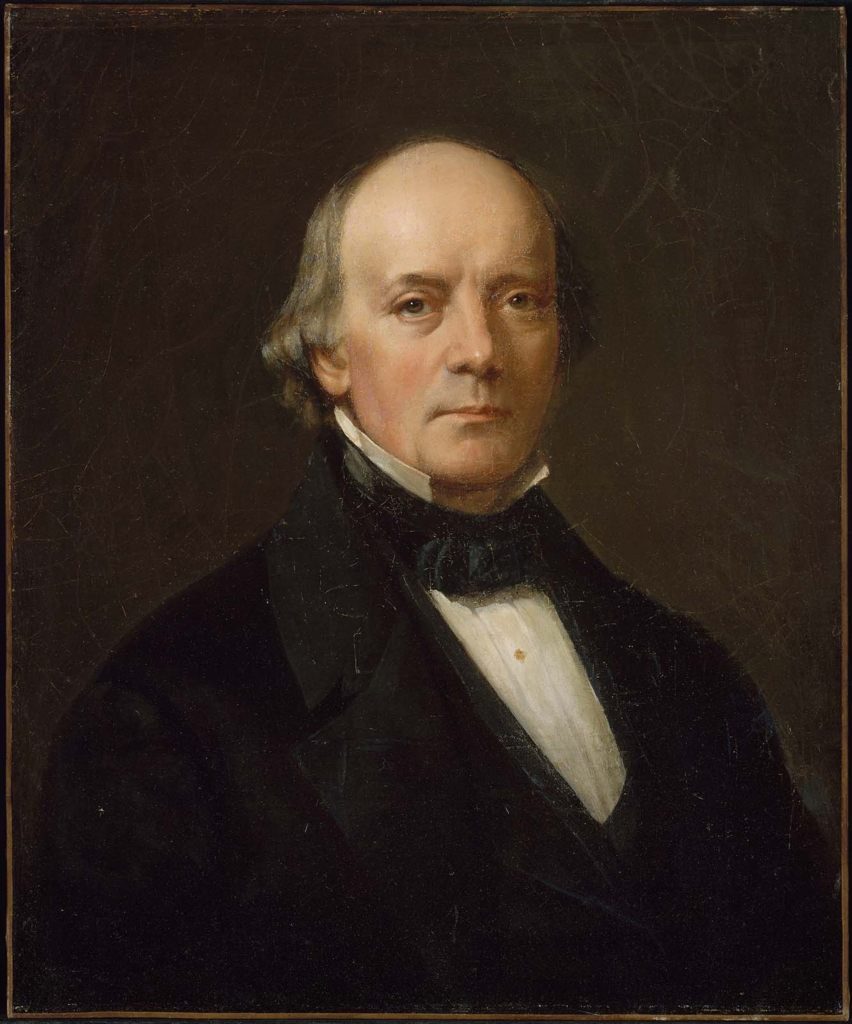
Harding's self-portrait, c. 1843, at the Museum of Fine Arts, Boston.

In the War of 1812, he marched as a drummer with the militia to the St Lawrence. He became subsequently chair-maker, peddler, inn-keeper, and house-painter, painting signs in Pittsburgh, Pennsylvania. He worked at this latter occupation a year, when acquaintance with a traveling portrait painter led him to attempt that art. Having succeeded in producing a crude portrait of his wife, he devoted himself enthusiastically to the profession.

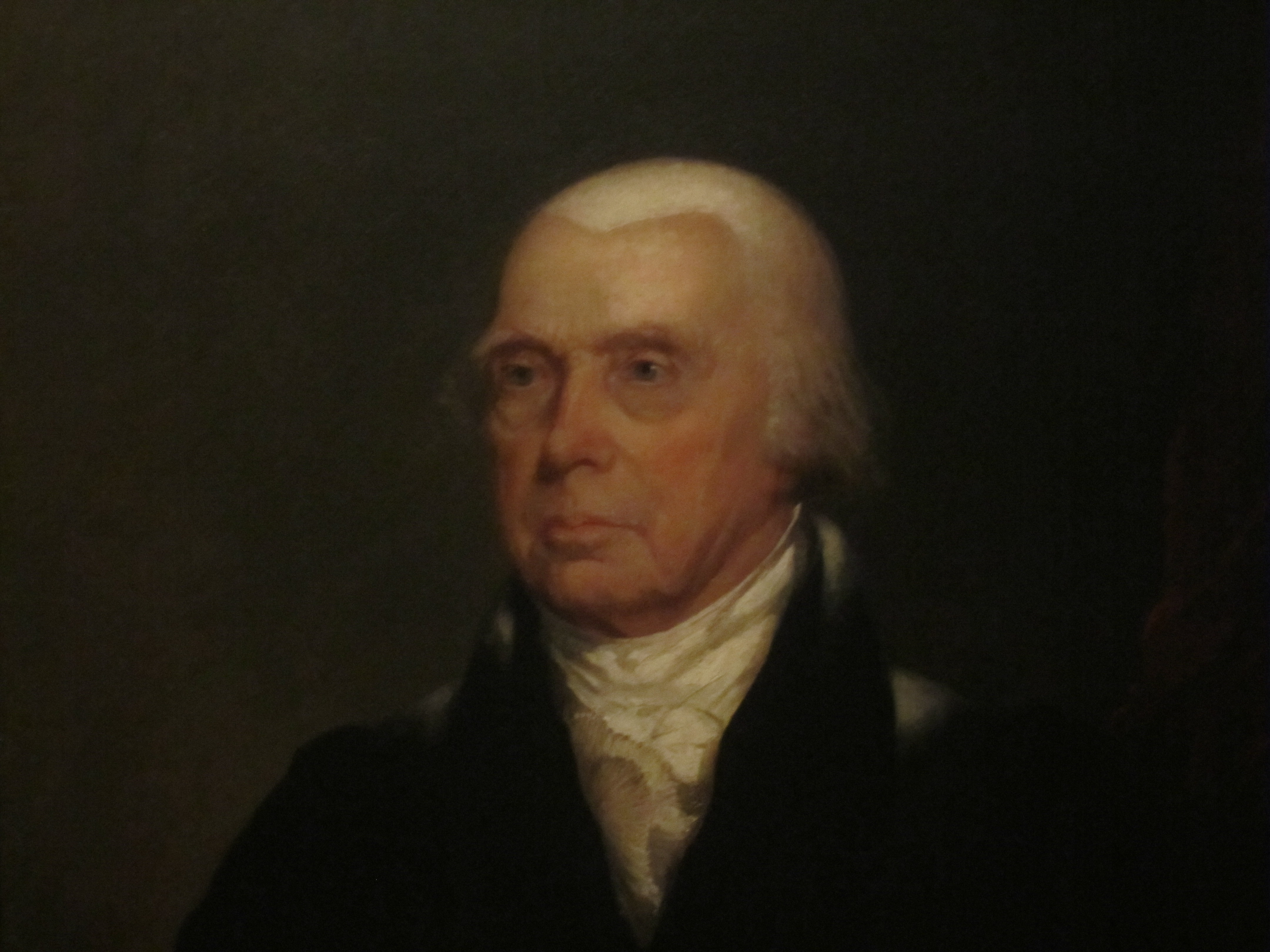
Harding's portrait of James Madison, 1829.

He painted several other portraits at Pittsburgh, and then went to Paris, Kentucky, where he finished 100 portraits in six months at $25 each. He made enough money to take him to the schools at the Pennsylvania Academy of the Fine Arts in Philadelphia. He then established himself in St. Louis, and eventually went on the road as an itinerant portrait painter. In August 1823, he went to England and set up a studio in London, and spent three years in studying and painting. He met with great success, painting royalty and the nobility, and, despite the lack of an early education and social experience, he became a favorite in all circles.

On his return to the United States in 1826, he settled in Boston, initially residing in Beacon Hill, Boston, Massachusetts, in what became known as the Chester Harding House, a National Historic Landmark which now houses the Boston Bar Association. He stayed there until 1830. In 1845, after the death of his wife, he went to England again for a second nine-month visit. After his return, he resided in Springfield, Massachusetts, spending his winters frequently in St. Louis or in some of the southern cities. In 1828, he was elected into the National Academy of Design as an Honorary Academician.

He wrote My Egotistography, which was privately printed.

=== Portraits ===
He painted portraits of many of the prominent men and women of his time. Among the people who sat for him were James Madison, James Monroe, John Quincy Adams, John Marshall, Nicholas Brown Jr., Dudley Leavitt Pickman, Charles Carroll, William Wirt, Henry Clay, John C. Calhoun, Washington Allston, Stephen Van Rensselaer, Samuel Rogers, Sir Archibald Allison, and the Dukes of Norfolk, Hamilton, and Sussex. Harding is the only known painter who painted Daniel Boone from life. His last work was a portrait of Gen. William T. Sherman. His portrait of Daniel Webster went to the Bar Association of New York, and that of John Randolph to the Corcoran Gallery at Washington, D.C.

== Personal life ==
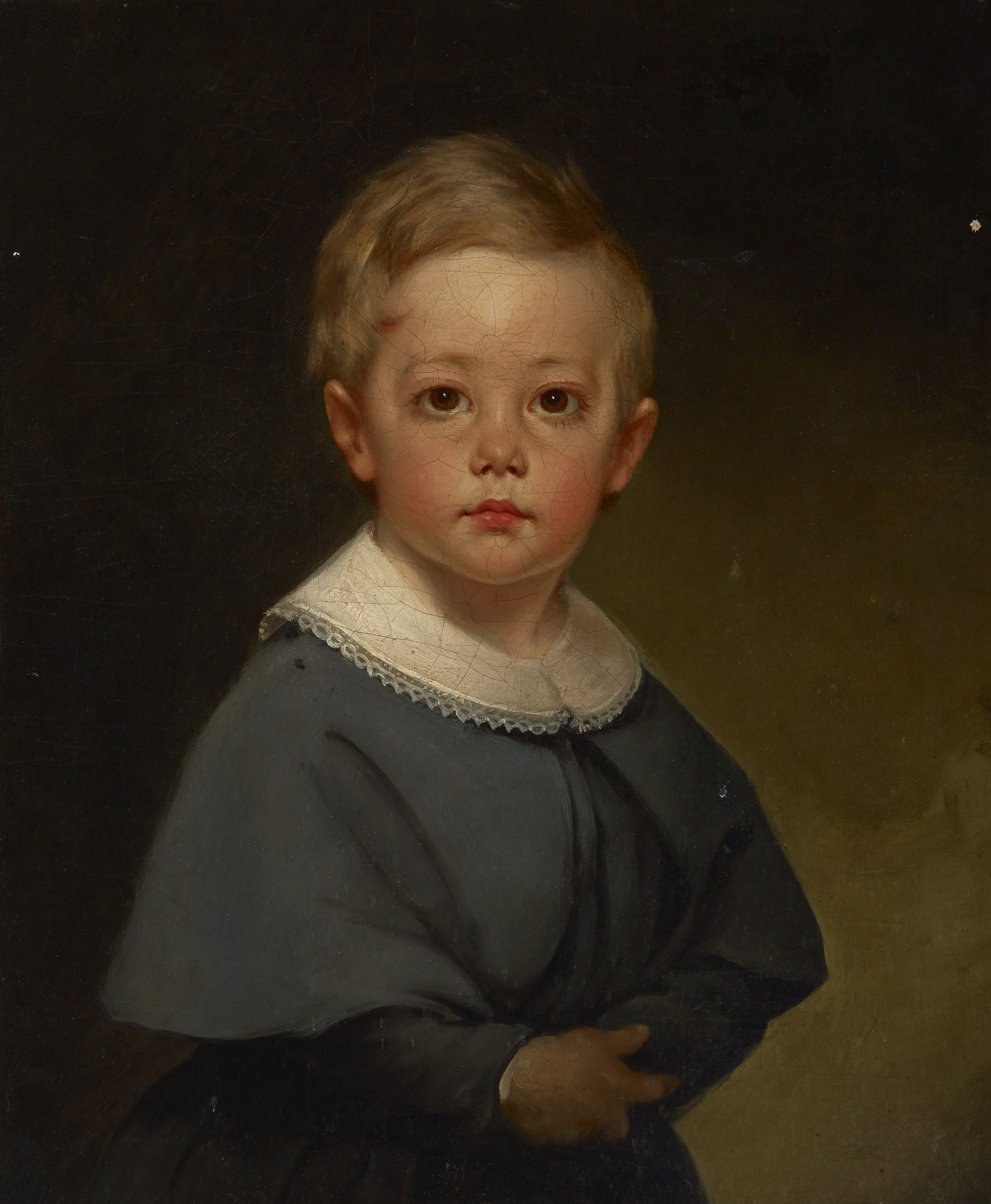
Portrait of his grandson, Chester Harding Krum.

On February 14, 1815, Harding was married to Caroline Matilda Woodruff (1795–1845) near Caledonia in Livingston County, New York. Caroline was the daughter of James Woodruff. Together, they were the parents of nine children, including four sons, two each who fought on opposing sides in the Civil War:

- Mary Ophelia Harding (1818–1892), who married John Marshall Krum (1810–1888), the 11th Mayor of St. Louis, in 1839.
- Margaret Eliot Harding (1823–1908), who married Rev. William Orne White (1821–1911) in 1863.
- Chester Harding Jr. (1827–1875), a Union Army Brevet Brigadier General.
- Horace Harding (1828–1899), a civil engineer.
- James Harding (1830–1902), a General in the Missouri State Guard and Major in the Confederate States Army. He married Christina Amelia Cordell (1834–1899) in 1855.

His wife died on August 27, 1845, in Springfield, Massachusetts. Harding died in Boston on April 1, 1866, and is buried in Springfield Cemetery in Springfield.

=== Descendants ===
Through his son Horace, he was the paternal grandfather of William P. G. Harding (1864–1930), the Chairman of the Federal Reserve and President of the Federal Reserve Bank of Boston, and Chester Harding (1866–1936), the Governor of the Panama Canal Zone from 1917 to 1921 who, late in life, also became a noted portrait painter.

== Portrait gallery ==
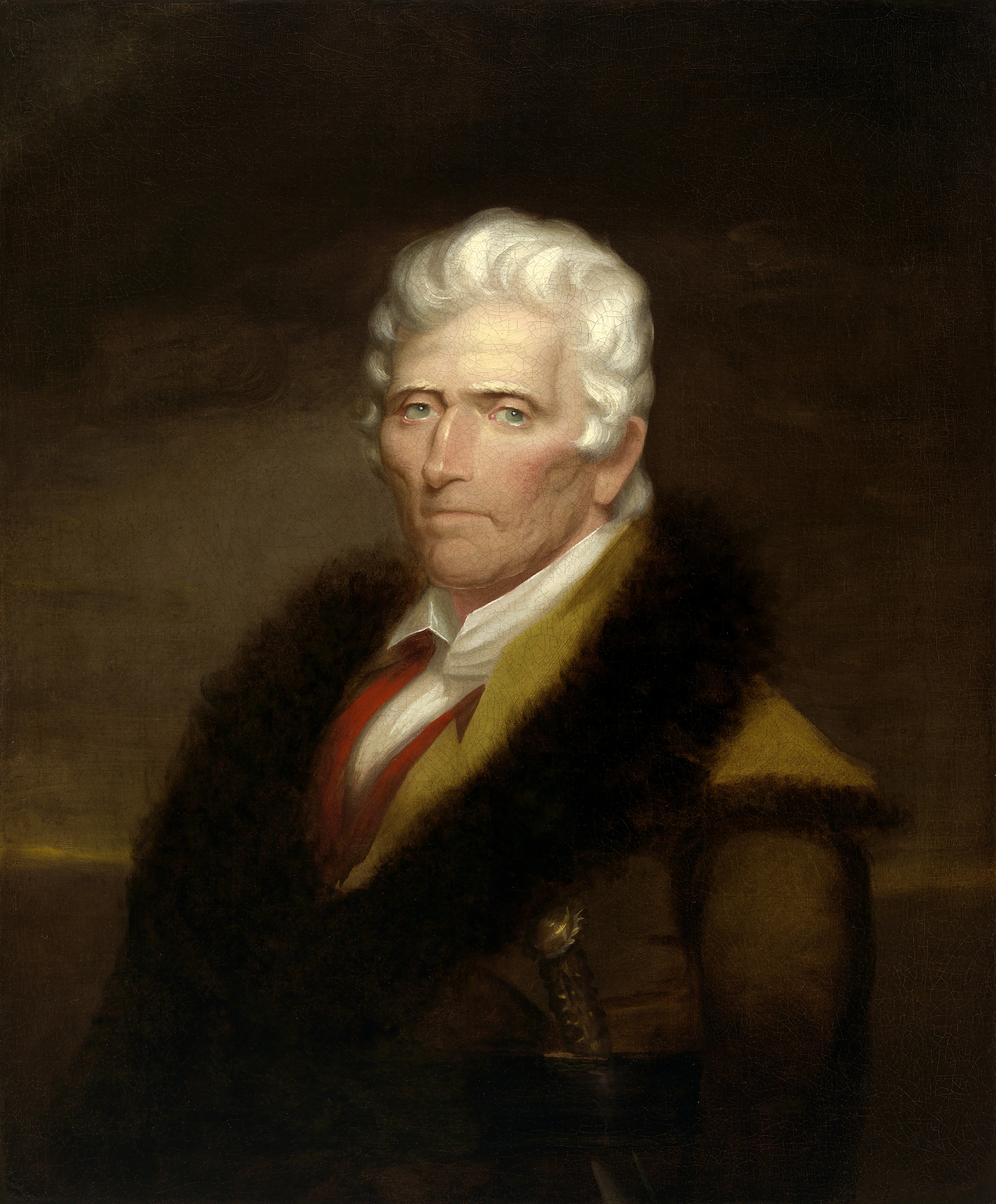
Daniel Boone, c. 1820.

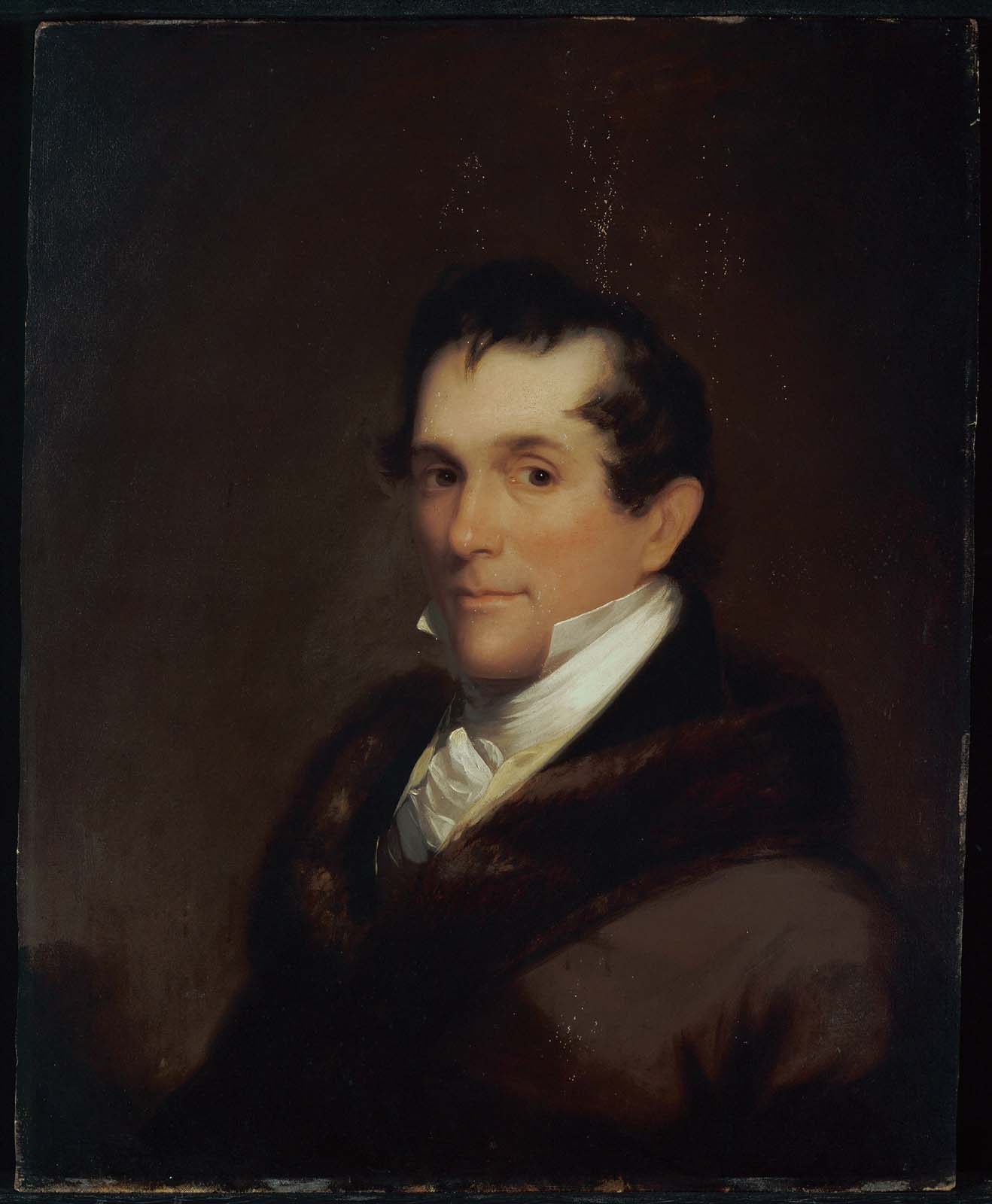
Eben Rollins, c. 1822.

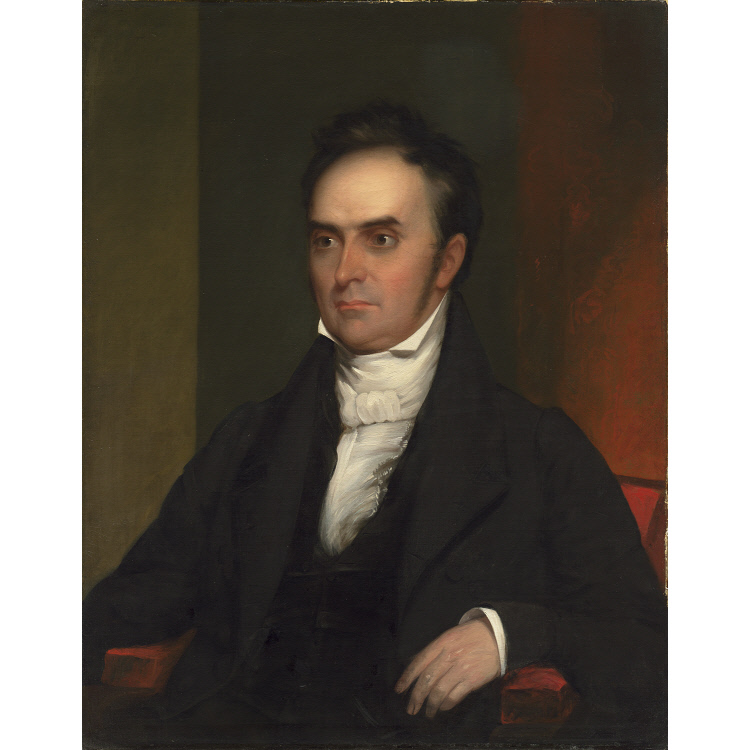
Daniel Webster, c. 1823 – c. 1833.

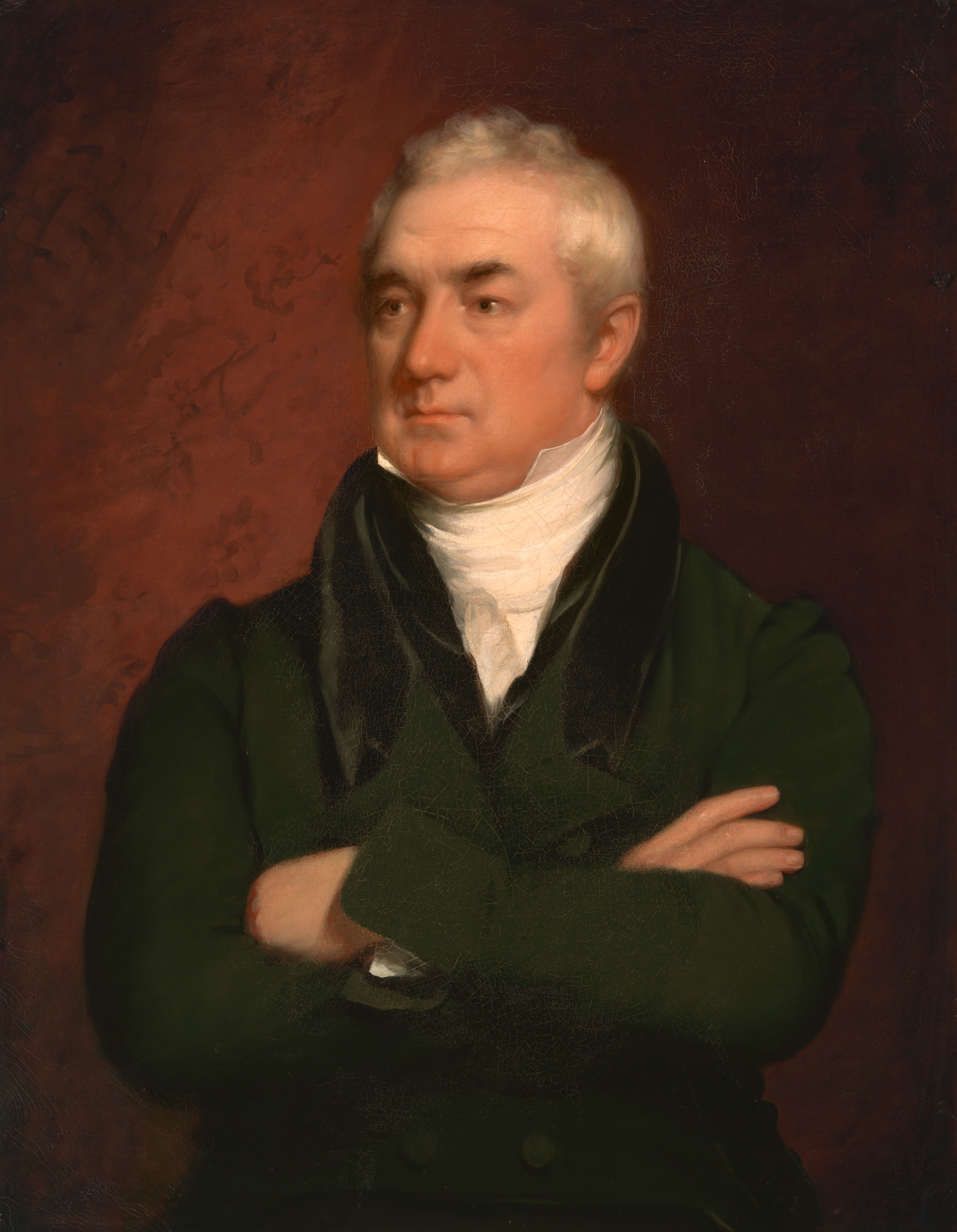
Loammi Baldwin Jr., 1823.

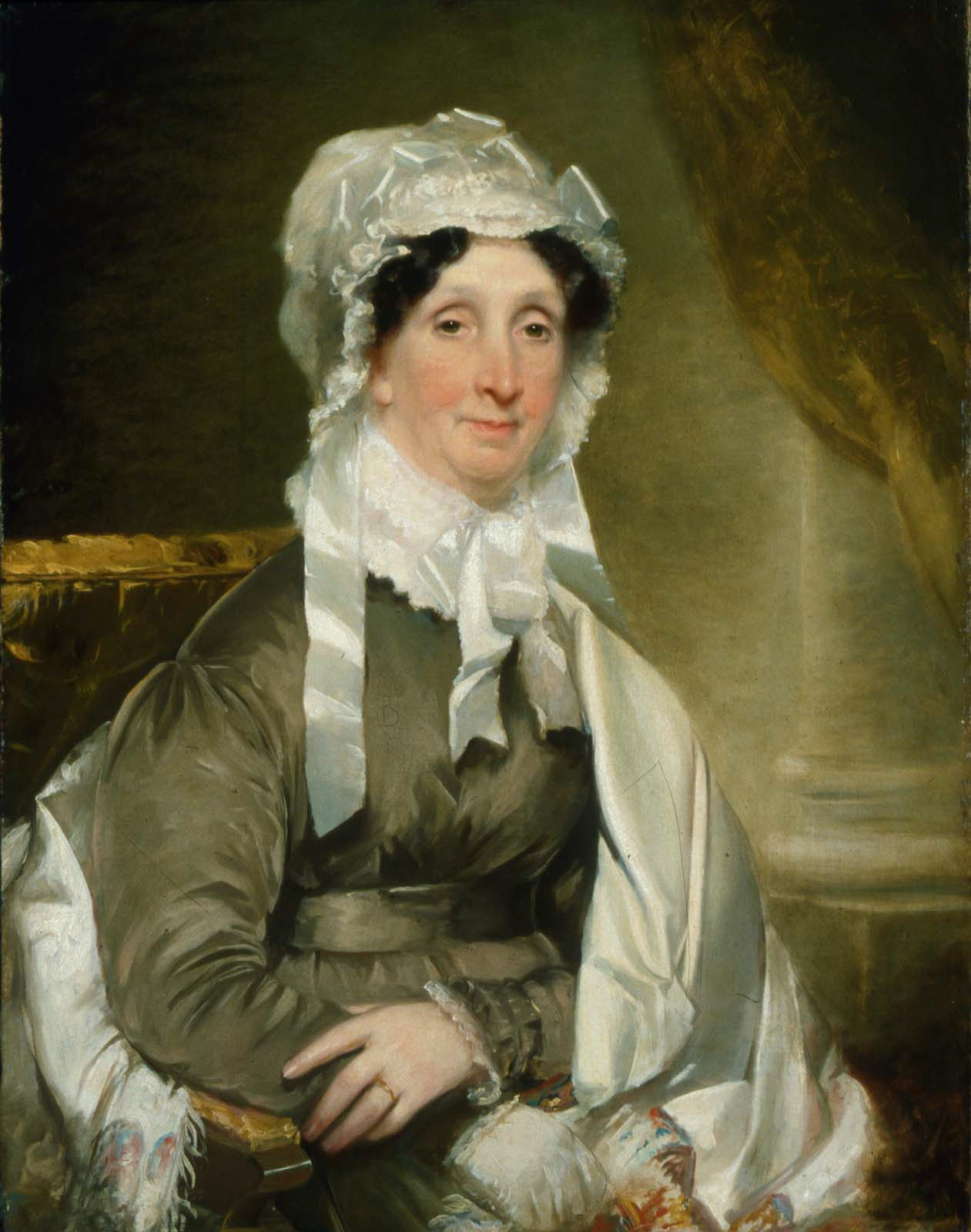
Elizabeth Murray Robbins (Mrs. Edward Hutchinson Robbins), c. 1827

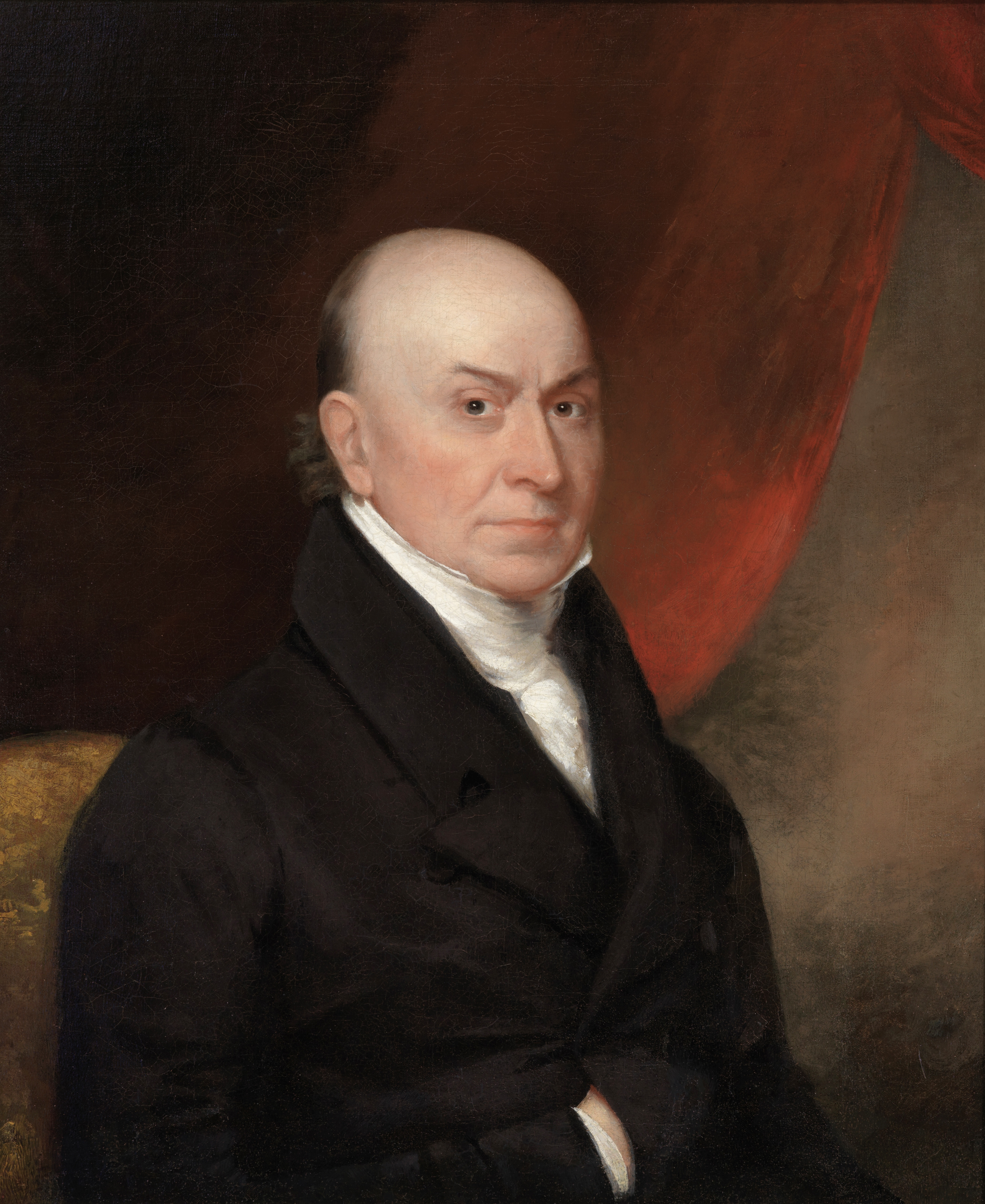
John Quincy Adams, c. 1828.

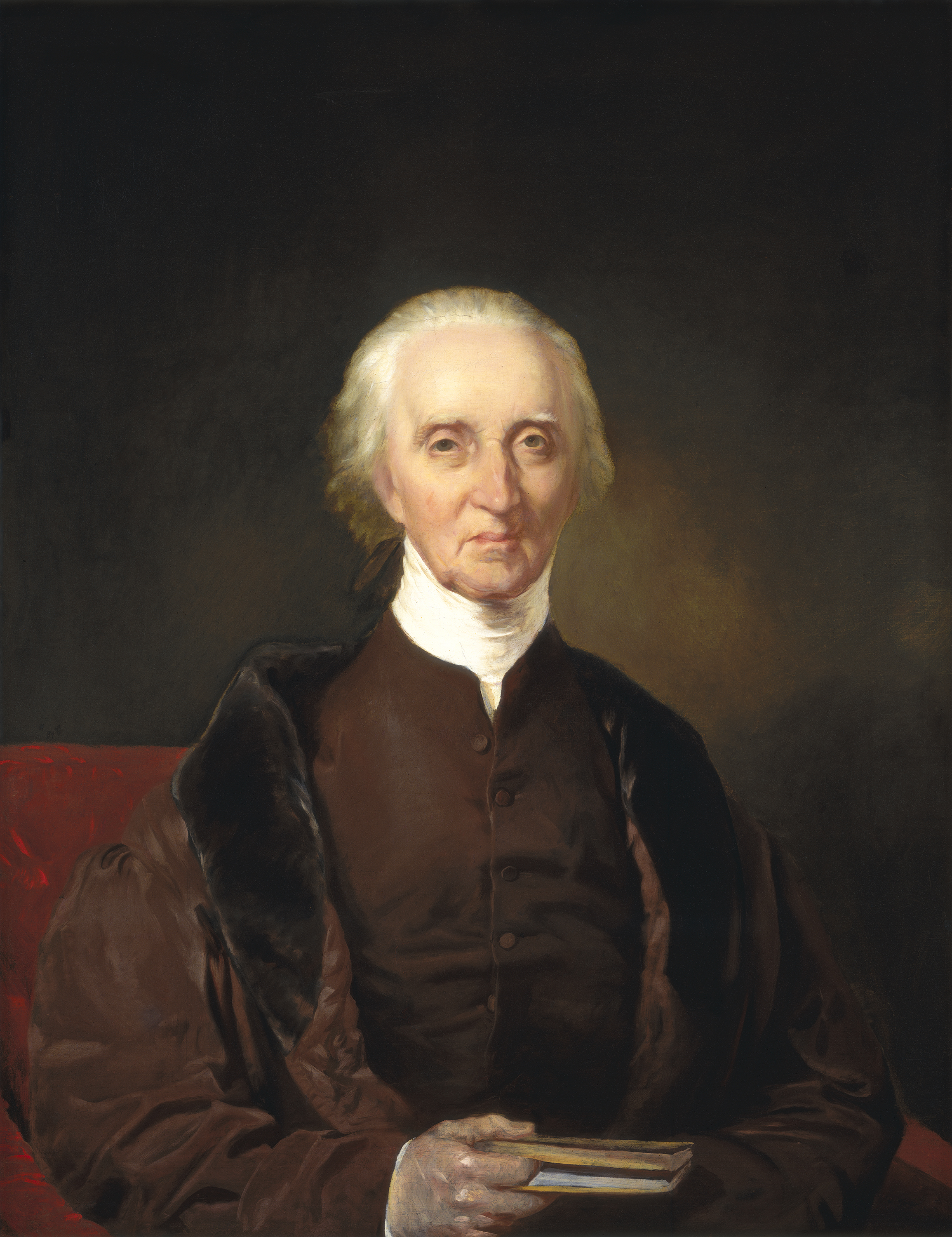
Charles Carroll, c. 1828.

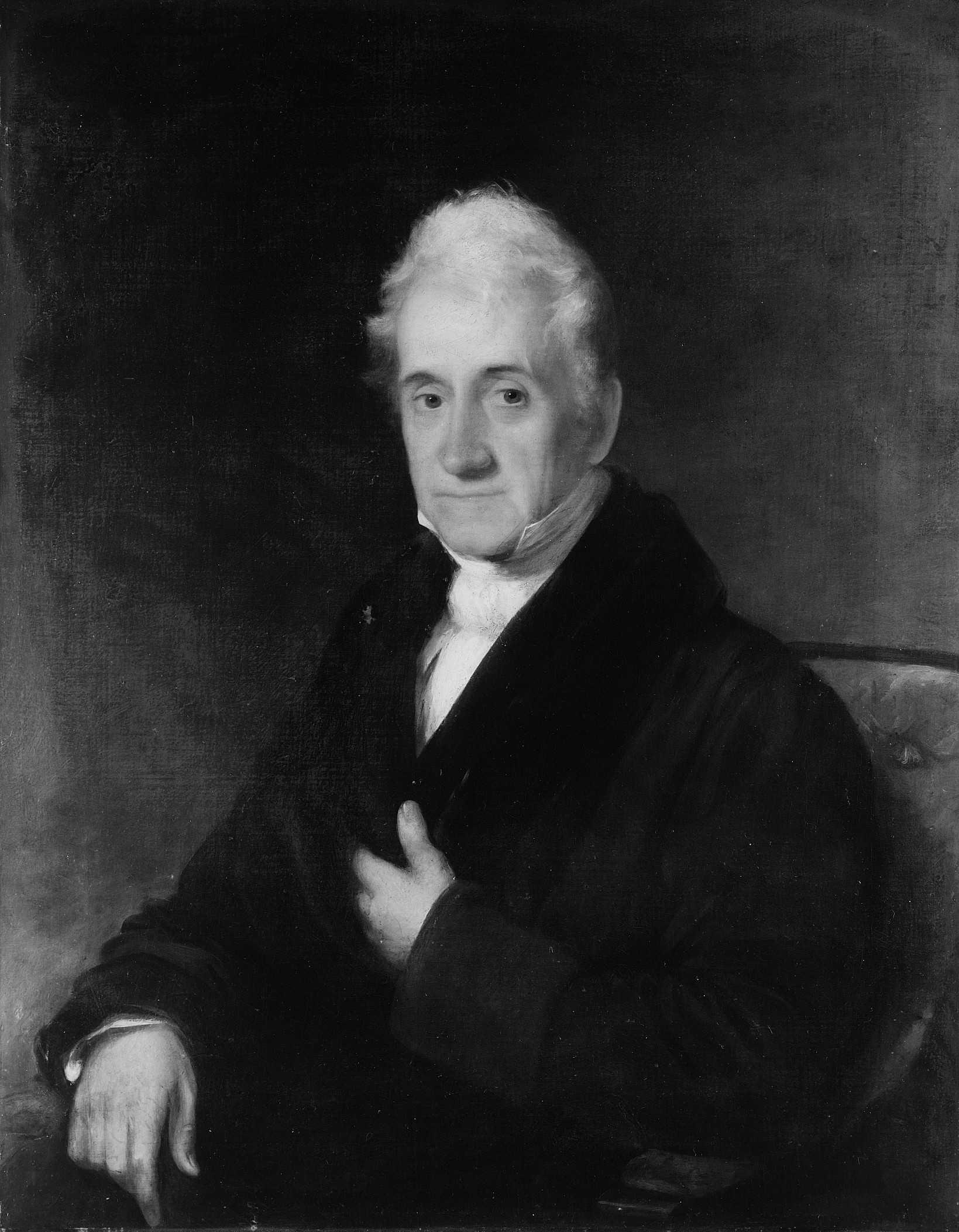
Stephen Van Rensselaer, c. 1828

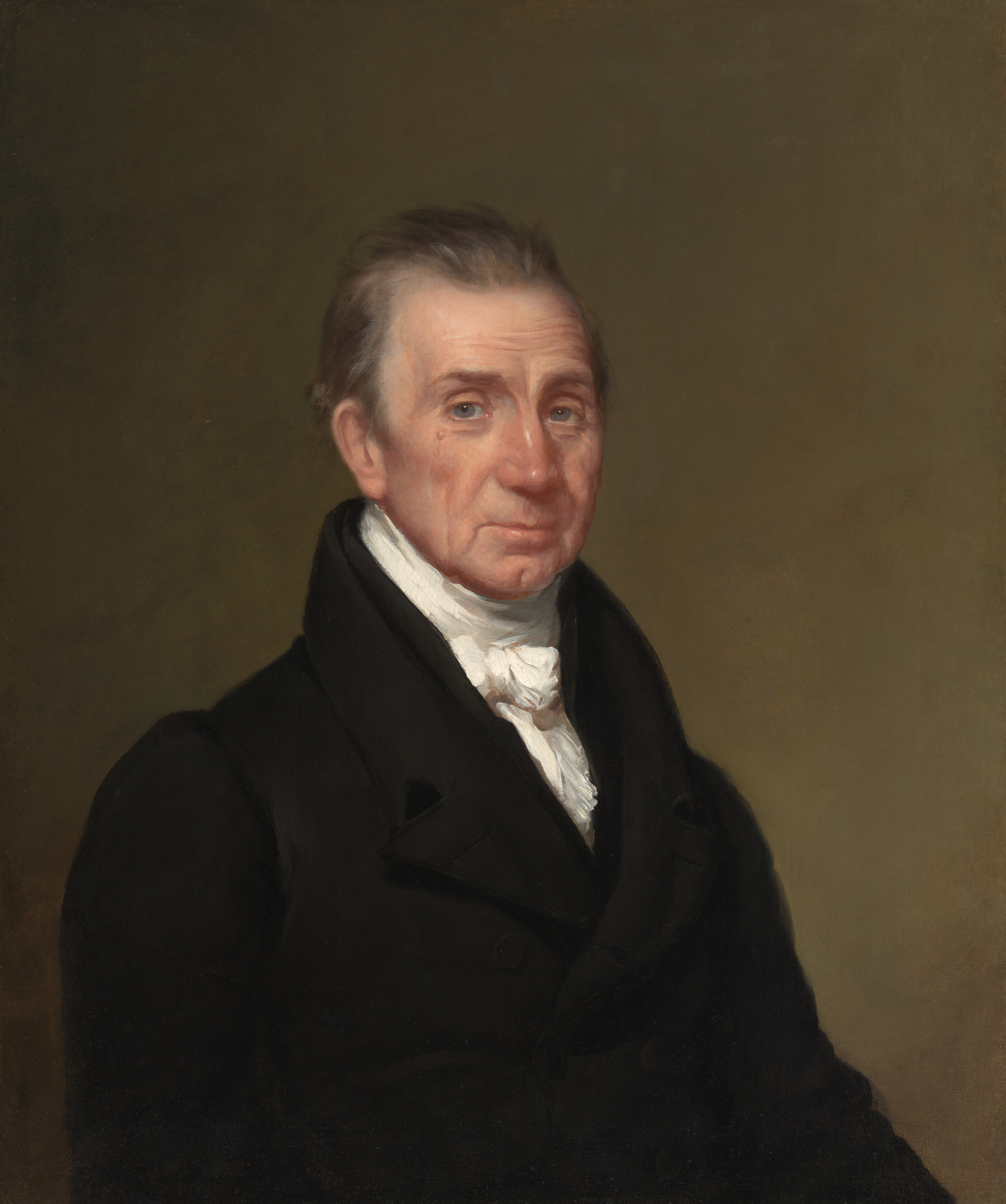
James Monroe, c. 1829

John Randolph of Roanoke, c. 1829–1830

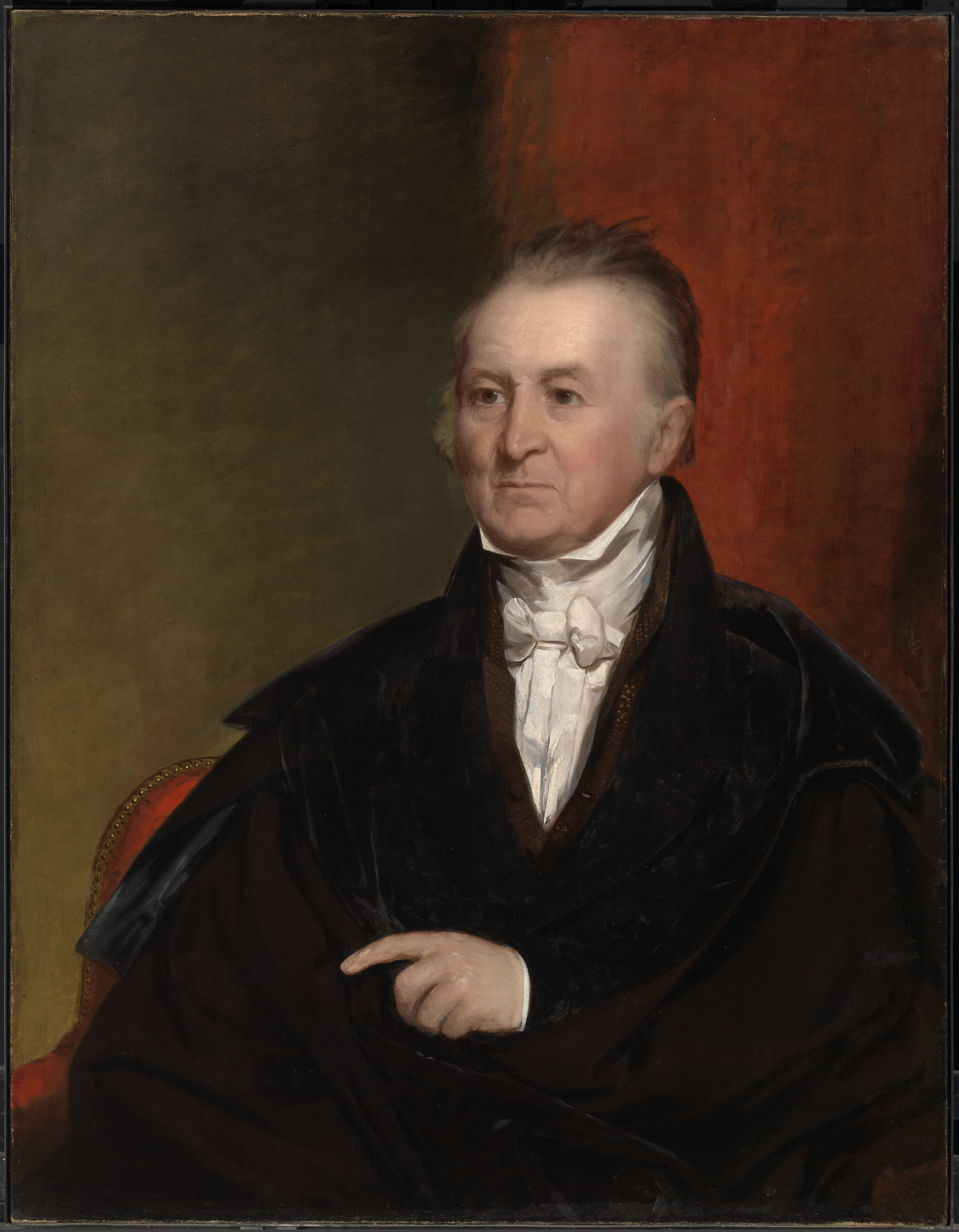
Harrison Gray Otis, c. 1833

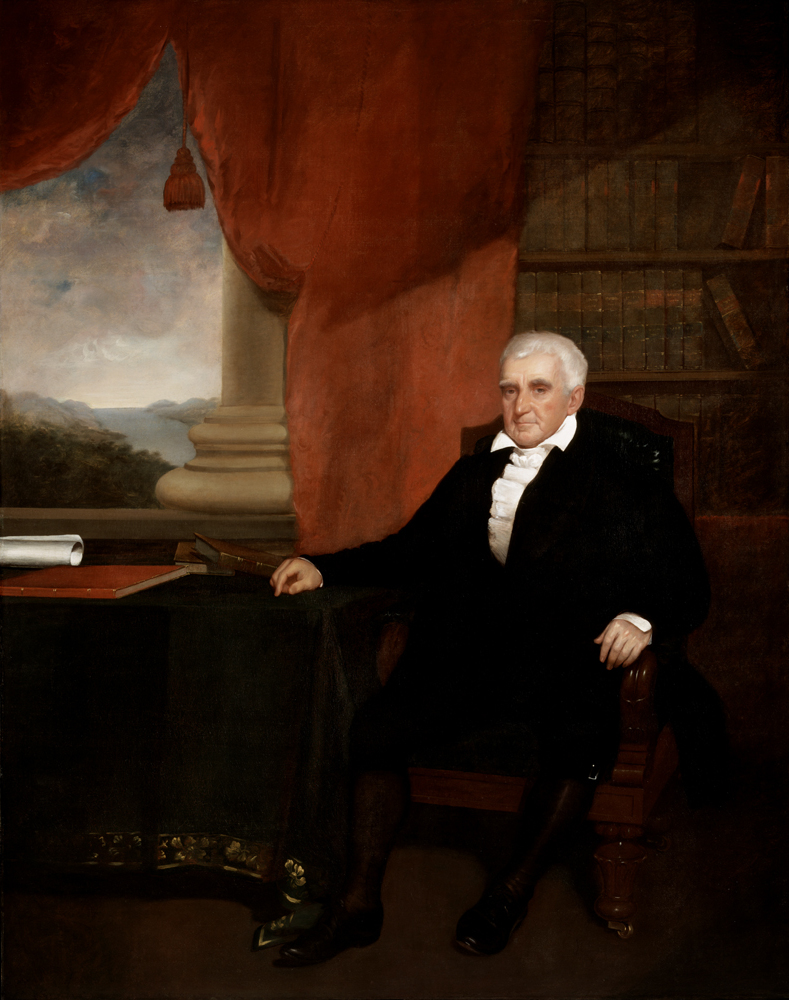
Nicholas Brown, Jr., c. 1836

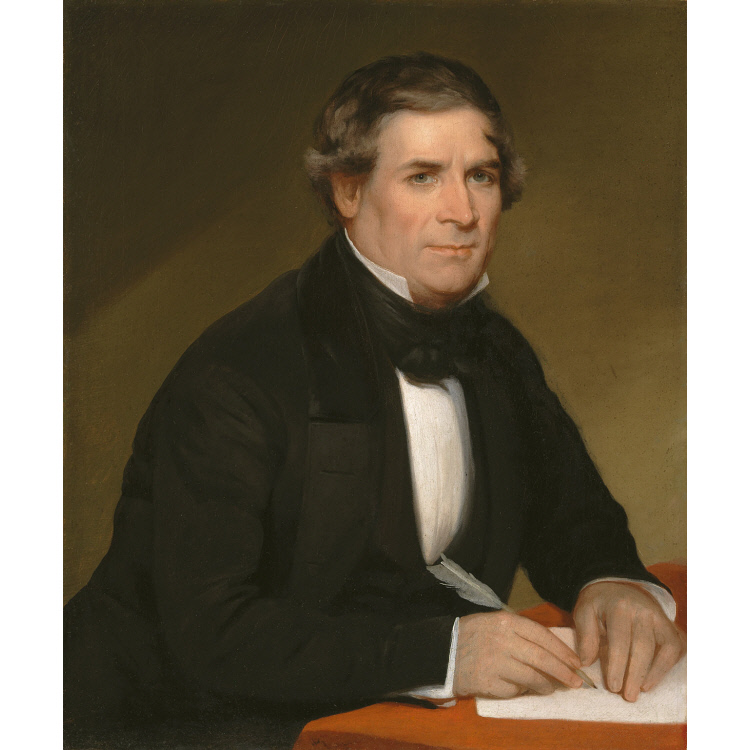
Thurlow Weed, c. 1843

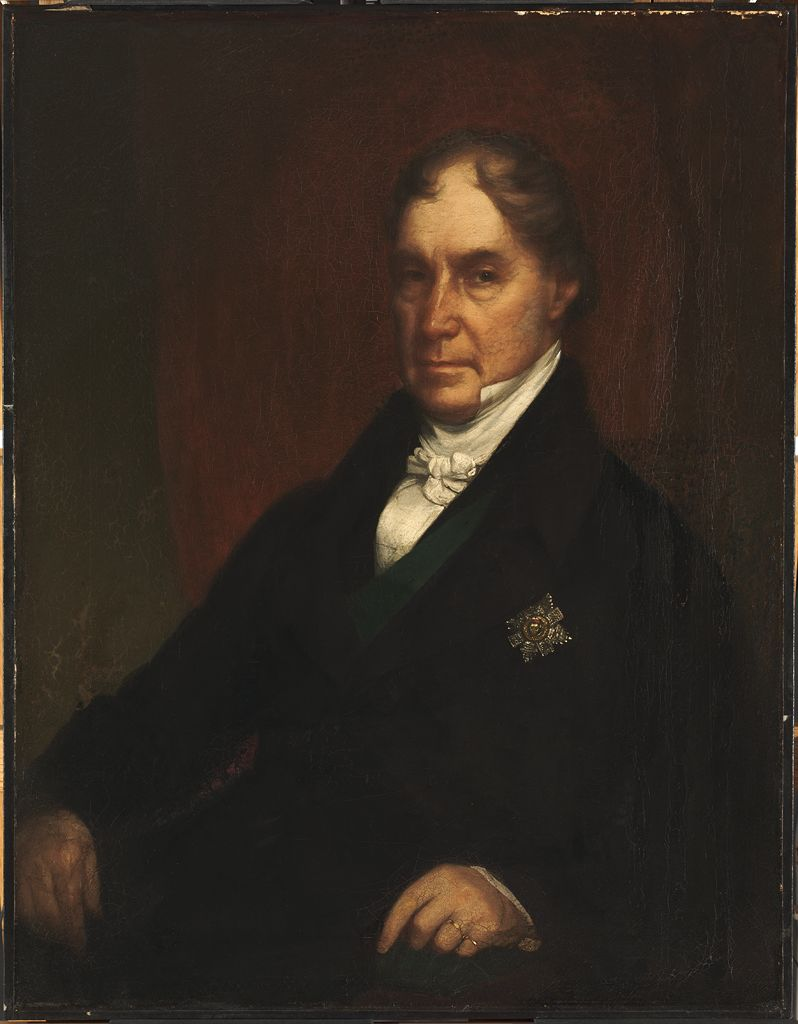
George Hamilton-Gordon, 4th Earl of Aberdeen, c. 1847

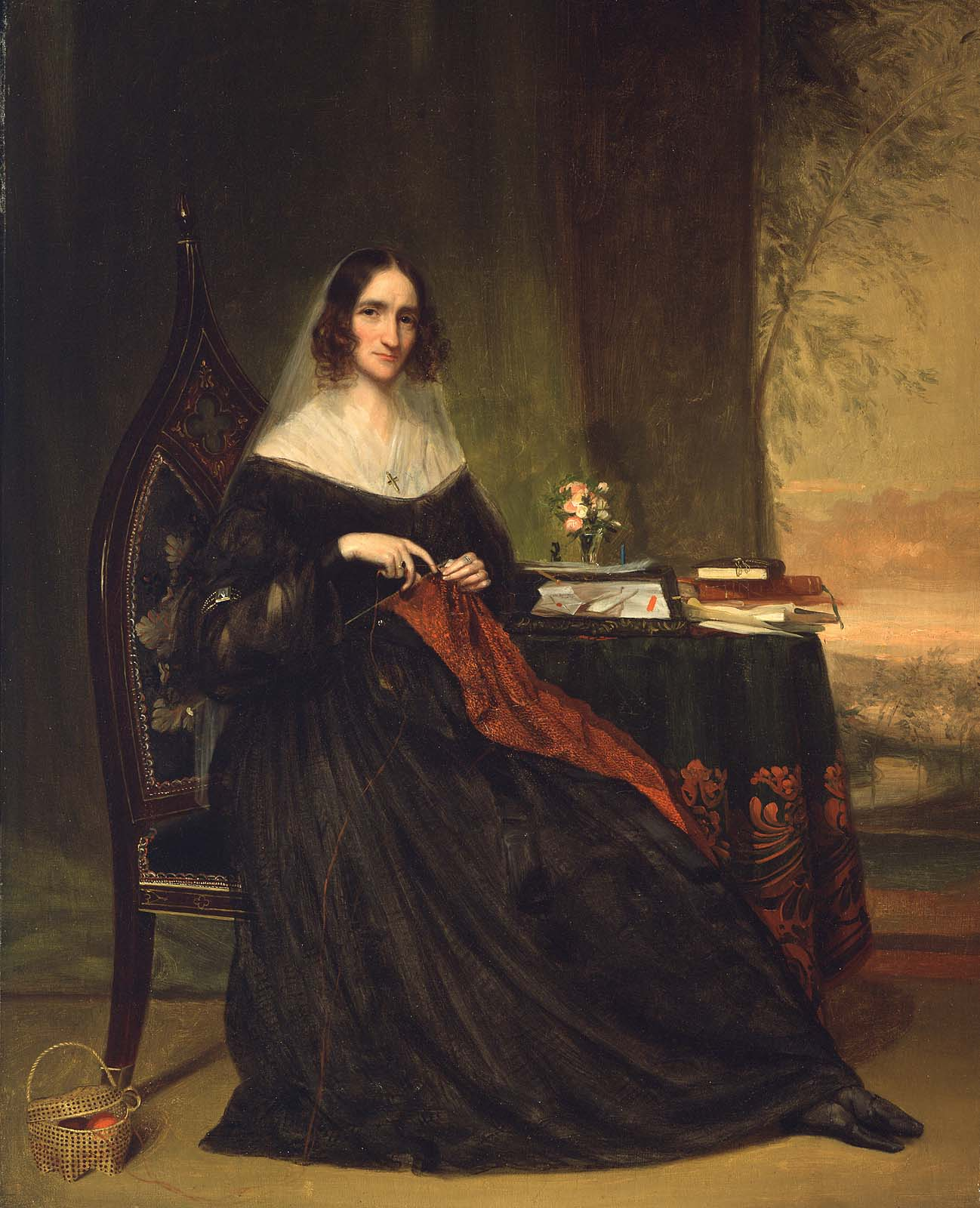
Katherine Bigelow Lawrence (Mrs. Abbott Lawrence), c. 1855.

== See also ==
- Harding's Gallery (Boston)
