= Chester Harding Jr. =

United States Army officer (1827–1875)

Chester Harding
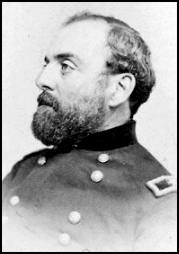
- Born: October 16, 1827; Northampton, Massachusetts, United States
- Died: February 10, 1875 (aged 47); St. Louis, Missouri, United States
- Burial place: Jefferson Barracks National Cemetery, St. Louis
- Education: Harvard Law School
- Military career
- Allegiance: United States: Union
- Branch: Union Army
- Service years: 1861–1865
- Rank: Colonel; Brevet Brigadier General
- Commands: 10th Missouri Infantry Regiment; 25th Missouri Infantry Regiment; 43rd Missouri Infantry Regiment
- Conflicts: American Civil War; Battle of Glasgow

Chester Harding Jr. (October 16, 1827 – February 10, 1875) was an American lawyer and military officer who participated in the American Civil War, and is known for commanding the 43rd Missouri Infantry Regiment at the Battle of Glasgow, Missouri.

== Biography ==
Harding was born in October 16, 1827, in Northampton, Massachusetts as the son of Chester Harding Sr. He entered military service upon the outbreak of the American Civil War, initially as a Lieutenant Colonel and Assistant Adjutant General on the staff of Brig. General Nathaniel Lyon and commanded the 10th Missouri and 25th Missouri infantry regiments.

He later commanded the 43rd Missouri Infantry Regiment as part of the defense of Missouri during Price's Missouri Expedition. Harding confronted the Confederates at the Battle of Glasgow, Missouri, which ended in defeat for the Union. When the war concluded, Harding was brevetted to Brigadier General for "faithful and meritorious services during the war" and replaced Brigadier General John McNeil as commander of the District of Central Missouri. He was mustered out in June 1865. Harding died in St. Louis on February 10, 1875, and was interred there in the Jefferson Barracks National Cemetery.

== See also ==
- List of American Civil War brevet generals (Union)
