= Chester Harding House =

Historic house in Boston, Massachusetts

- U.S. National Register of Historic Places
- U.S. National Historic Landmark
- U.S. National Historic Landmark District – Contributing property
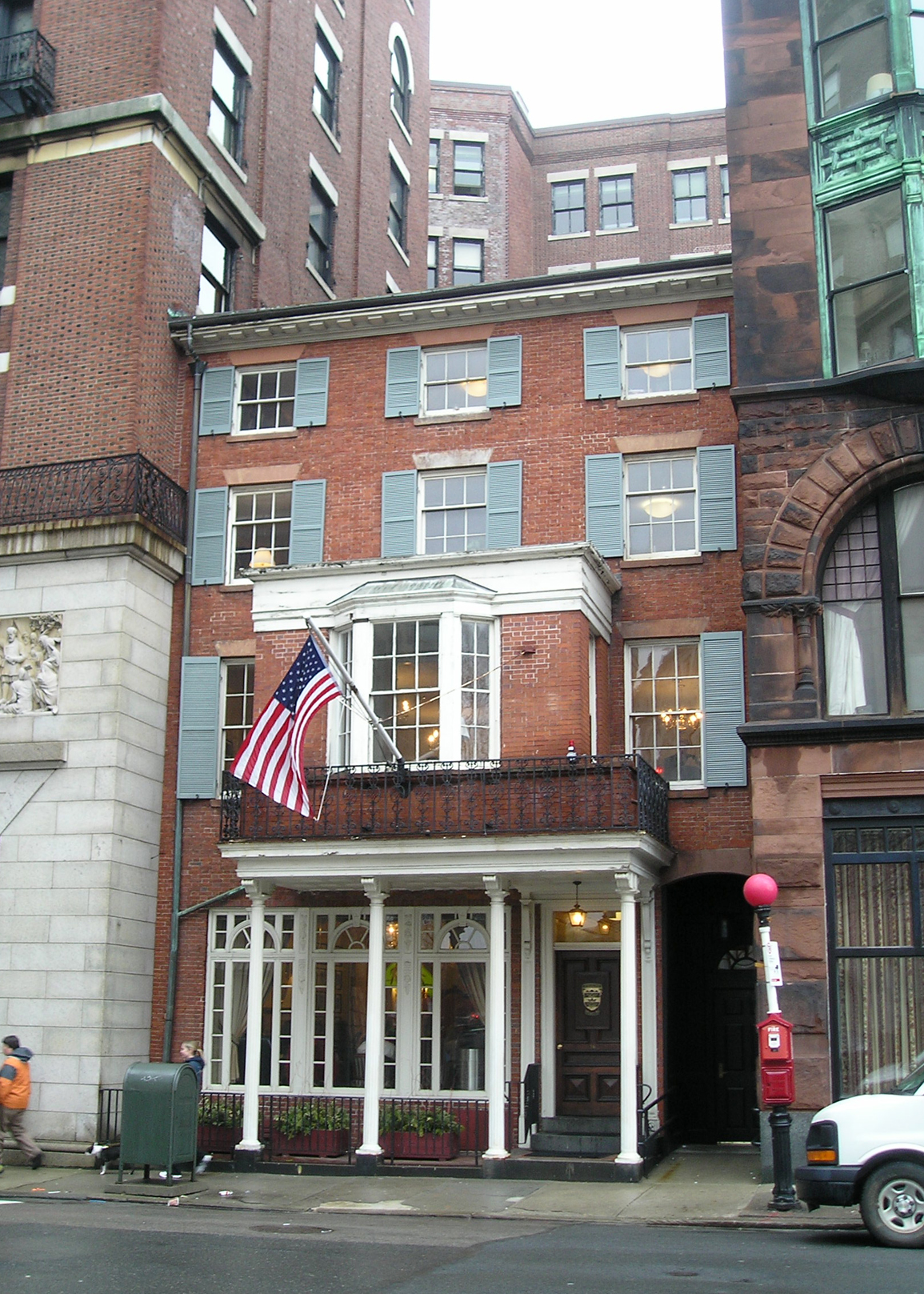
- The brick Federal-style home of the American painter from 1826 to 1830 now houses the Boston Bar Association. To the right is the Claflin Building.

- Location within Boston Location within Massachusetts Location within the United States
- Location: Boston, Massachusetts
- Coordinates: 42°21′28.3″N 71°3′45.36″W
- Built: 1808
- Architect: Fletcher, Thomas
- Architectural style: Federal
- Part of: Beacon Hill Historic District (ID66000130)
- NRHP reference No.: 66000764

Significant dates
- Added to NRHP: October 15, 1966
- Designated NHL: December 21, 1965
- Designated NHLDCP: October 15, 1966

The Chester Harding House is an historic building located at 16 Beacon Street in Boston, Massachusetts, United States, across from the Massachusetts State House on Beacon Hill. It was designated a National Historic Landmark in 1965 for its association with the noted portraitist Chester Harding, whose home it was from 1826 to 1830. The building has since 1963 been home to the Boston Bar Association.

== History ==
The four-story town house was built in the Federal architectural style as a private home by real estate developer Thomas Fletcher in 1808, at a time when Park Street and Beacon Street were lined by run-down public buildings. State officials decided to build replacements in other parts of the city, financing the construction of the new public buildings from the sale of the Park Street lots.

In 1826, the famous American portrait painter Chester Harding bought the house, which he occupied until 1830.

According to the Lawyers Pictorial Register, published by the Boston Bar Association in 1981, in the middle of the 19th century, the building was bought by Dr. Henry C. Angell, an art collector. As the neighborhood began to change from residential to commercial, many old houses were torn down and replaced by larger buildings which dwarfed the Chester Harding House. One such building is the 1884 six-floor Claflin Building. In 1919, the house was given by Martha B. Angell to the American Unitarian Association, which housed offices there until 1933. The American Unitarian Association loaned the house to Universalist Church of America until 1961, when the two merged. In January, 1962, the Boston Bar Association bought the house and moved its headquarters there from 35 Court Street. The Chester Harding House remains home to the Boston Bar Association.

Side view from the opposite street corner

Front door with Boston Bar Association emblem

As commemorated on a plaque hanging on the left-hand side of the building, the Chester Harding House was declared a U.S. National Historic Landmark in 1965.

== See also ==
- List of National Historic Landmarks in Massachusetts
- National Register of Historic Places listings in northern Boston, Massachusetts
