= Boston Youth Fund =

The Boston Youth Fund (BYF) is a program run by the City of Boston, at the behest of Mayor Thomas Menino, that offers employment during the summer and after school to youth workers from the City of Boston that are between the ages of 15-17. The BYF works with non-profit Community Based Organizations (CBO) to offer teens a unique job experience in their own community.

== Mission statement ==
The Boston Youth Fund strives to get teens working experience, along with a paycheck. The Boston Youth Fund does its best to place the youth worker in the worker's own community. Each February the Youth Fund opens up the Hopeline. The Hopeline is an online application that is also available over the phone. To be a part of the Boston Youth Fund, a teen signs up on the Hopeline and meet the age eligibility and residency requirements. The Hopeline is open for one month, giving the teens ample time to register.

== Hiring process ==
To be considered for a position, a youth worker has to be signed up on the Hopeline. The BYF selects workers using a random computer lottery. The youth selected in the lottery are contacted by BYF staff to find out if the teen is still interested in working. Once a teen accepts the position, they are invited to the BYF headquarters to be processed and placed on the payroll. Typical wages for the 6 week program are $8 an hour for a 25 hours work week.

== Requirements ==
A link to all the requirements for the Boston Youth Fund can be found on the BYF's website. An applicant must provide proof of age, Boston residency, school enrollment, and parental consent to be eligible for the program.
