= Eugenic feminism =

Areas of the women's suffrage movement which overlapped with eugenics

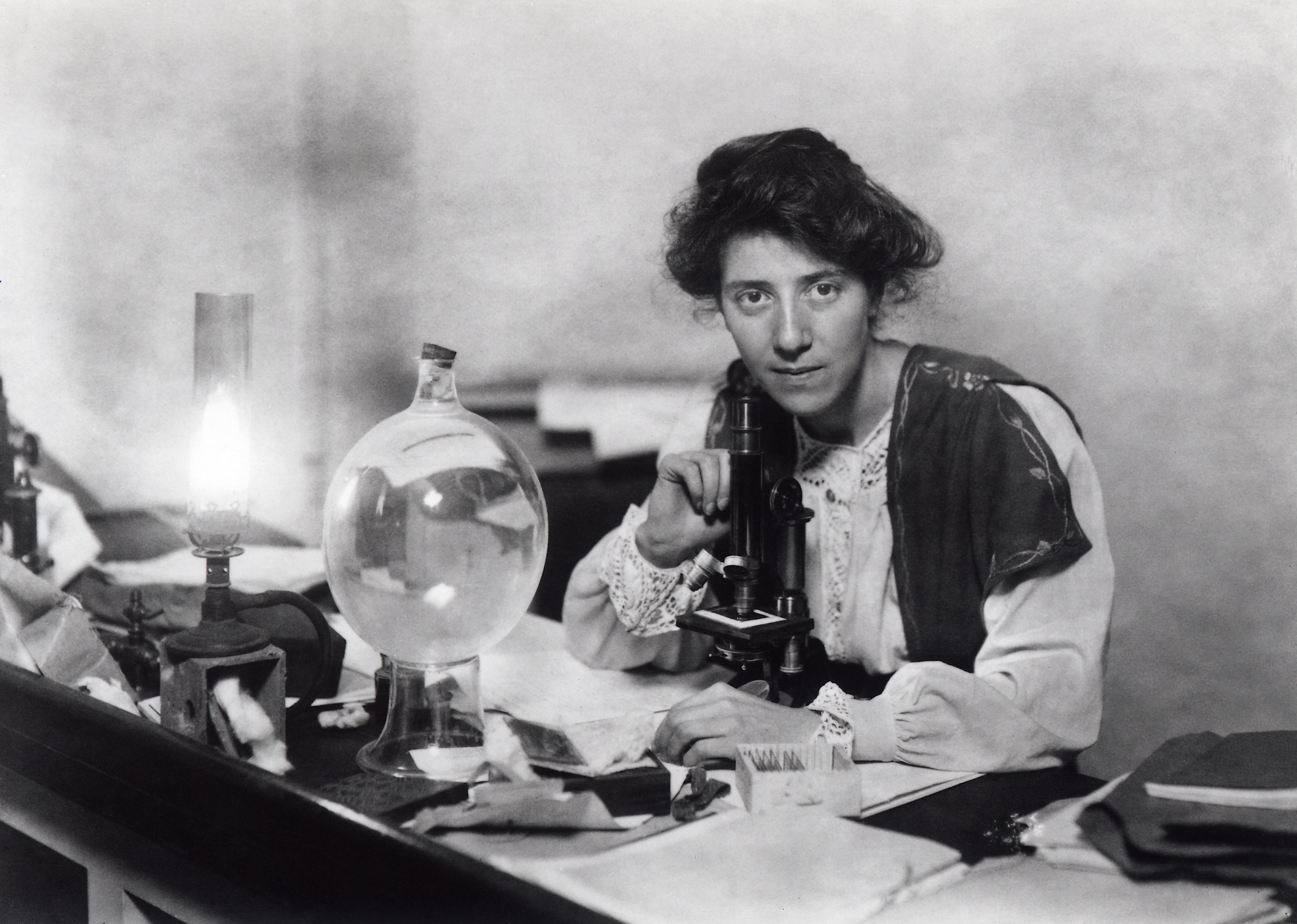
Marie Stopes in her laboratory, 1904

Eugenic feminism was a current of the women's suffrage movement which overlapped with eugenics. Originally coined by the Lebanese-British physician and vocal eugenicist Caleb Saleeby, the term has since been applied to summarize views held by prominent feminists of Great Britain and the United States. Some early suffragettes in Canada, especially a group known as The Famous Five, also pushed for various eugenic policies.

Eugenic feminists argued that if women were provided with more rights and equality, the deteriorating characteristics of a given race could be averted.

== History ==
When Francis Galton originally formulated eugenics, he saw women functioning as a mere conduit to pass desirable traits from father to son. Later eugenicists saw women in a more active role, placing an increasing emphasis on women as "mothers of the race". In particular new research in the science of heredity and the studies of procreation, child rearing and human reproduction led to changes in eugenic thought, which began to recognize the importance of women in those parts of the human life cycle. This change in emphasis led eventually to eugenicist Caleb Saleeby coining the term eugenic feminism in his book Woman and Womanhood: A Search for Principles (1911). Saleeby wrote,

The mark of the following pages is that they assume the principle of what we may call Eugenic Feminism, and that they endeavour to formulate its working-out. It is my business to acquaint myself with the literature of both eugenics and feminism, and I know that hitherto the eugenists have inclined to oppose the claims of feminism [...]

Devereux characterizes Saleeby's coining of eugenic feminism as "at least partly a deceptive rhetorical strategy" whose goal was to "draw middle-class women's rights activists back to home and duty".

In the 1930s, eugenic feminism began to decline as eugenic feminists began to fall out with mainstream eugenicists; further, it had largely failed to sway the public opinion.

== In Great Britain ==
=== The Case of Marie Stopes ===
In her biography of Marie Stopes, June Rose claimed "Marie was an elitist, an idealist, interested in creating a society in which only the best and beautiful should survive," a view echoed by Richard A. Soloway in the 1996 Galton Lecture: "If Stopes's general interest in birth control was a logical consequence of her romantic preoccupation with compatible sexuality within blissful marriage, her particular efforts to provide birth control for the poor had far more to do with her eugenic concerns about the impending 'racial darkness' that the adoption of contraception promised to illuminate."

Regarding threats of dysgenics, she spoke of "that intolerable stream of misery which ever overflows its banks."

Stopes's enthusiasm for eugenics and race improvement was in line with many intellectuals and public figures of the time: for example Havelock Ellis, Cyril Burt and George Bernard Shaw. Eugenic sympathies were drawn from the left and the right of politics and included Labour politicians, such as Ellen Wilkinson. As a child Stopes had met Francis Galton, one of the founders of modern eugenics, through her father. She joined the Eugenics Education Society in 1912 and became a life fellow in 1921. Clare Debenham in her 2018 biography of Stopes argues in Chapter Nine that she was a maverick eugenicist, who was shunned by the inner circle of the Eugenic Society. In 1934, she reflected: "I am a Life Fellow and would have much more interest in the Eugenics Society if I had not been cold shouldered".

The objects of the Society For Constructive Birth Control and Racial Progress expressed the eugenic aims of the Mothers' Clinic, summarised in Tenet 16:

"In short, we are profoundly and fundamentally a pro-baby organisation, in favour of producing the largest possible number of healthy, happy children without detriment to the mother, and with the minimum wastage of infants by premature deaths. In this connection our motto has been 'Babies in the right place,' and it is just as much the aim of Constructive Birth Control to secure conception to those married people who are healthy, childless, and desire children, as it is to furnish security from conception to those who are racially diseased, already overburdened with children, or in any specific way unfitted for parenthood."

"Racially diseased" included conditions such as infectious diseases (like tuberculosis), or caused by environmental factors (such as poor living conditions and malnutrition).

In 1918 and 1920, Stopes advocated the compulsory sterilisation of those she considered unfit for parenthood.

In Chapter XX of her 1920 book Radiant Motherhood Stopes discussed race and said that the "one central reform" was: "The power of the mother, consciously exerted in the voluntary procreation and joyous bearing of her children, is the greatest power in the world". She added that two "main dangers" stood in the way. The first of these was ignorance and the second was the "inborn incapacity which lies in the vast and ever increasing stock of degenerate, feeble-minded and unbalanced who are now in our midst and who devastate social customs. These populate most rapidly and tend proportionately to increase and these are like the parasite upon the healthy tree sapping its vitality." Stopes then stated that "a few quite simple acts of Parliament" could deal with "this prolific depravity" through sterilisation by x-rays and assured the reader that "when Bills are passed to ensure the sterility of the hopelessly rotten and racially diseased, and to provide for the education of the child-bearing woman so that she spaces her children healthily, our race will rapidly quell the stream of the depraved, hopeless and wretched lives which are at present increasing in proportion in our midst".

Stopes promoted her eugenic ideas to politicians. In 1920 she sent a copy of her book, Radiant Motherhood—arguably the most explicitly eugenic of her books—to the prime minister's secretary (and mistress), Frances Stevenson, and urged her to get David Lloyd George to read them. In November 1922, just before the general election, she sent a questionnaire to parliamentary candidates asking that they sign a declaration that: "I agree that the present position of breeding chiefly from the C3 population and burdening and discouraging the A1 is nationally deplorable, and if I am elected to Parliament I will press the Ministry of Health to give such scientific information through the Ante-natal Clinics, Welfare Centres and other institutions in its control as will curtail the C3 and increase the A1". She received 150 replies.

In July 1931 the Women's Co-operative Guild at their conference passed a resolution advocating compulsory sterilisation for the mentally or physically unfit.

A 1933 letter from Stopes to a friend revealed disillusion with eugenics: "I do not think I want to write a book about Eugenics. The word has been so tarnished by some people that they are not going to get my name tacked onto it". Despite this, she attended the International Congress for Population Science in Berlin in 1935. After attending this conference she came under attack by some of her former supporters such as Guy Aldred and Havelock Ellis and, on her death in 1958, she bequeathed her clinics to the Eugenics Society.

In 1934, an interview published in the Australian Women's Weekly disclosed her views on mixed-race marriages: she advised correspondents against them and believed that all half-castes should be sterilized at birth... "thus painlessly and in no way interfering with the individual's life, the unhappy fate of he who is neither black nor white is prevented from being passed on to yet unborn babes."

In August 1939 she sent a copy of her Love Song for Young Lovers to Adolf Hitler because "Love is the greatest thing in the world". She wanted her poems to be distributed through the German birth control clinics. However, according to Rose, any sympathy she may have had with Hitler was dissipated when he closed those clinics. On 12 July 1940 she wrote to Winston Churchill to offer a slogan, "Fight the Battle of Britain in Berlin's Air".

Ties between feminism and eugenics continued in Britain through the Abortion Law Reform Association (ALRA), established in 1936. Historian Susanne Maria Kalusen, the organization emphasized women’s reproductive rights and voluntary motherhood. In the 1940s, ALRA pushed for abortion laws that permitted termination in cases of fetal abnormalities. In the early 1950s, the association collaborated with the Eugenics Society to promote the reforms. ALRA later played a role in the passage of Abortion Act 1967, this included allowing abortions on grounds of fetal impairment.

=== Feminist relationships with the Eugenics Society ===
During the interwar period in Britain, the relation between feminists and eugenics varied considerably. Eleanor Rathbone, Eva Hubback, and Mary Stocks campaigned for family allowances, birth control and voluntary sterilisation. Both Rathbone and Stocks sought active support from eugenics society, but did so for pragmatic reasons. This illustrates cooperation between the two groups does not necessarily mean shared ideology.

== In Canada ==
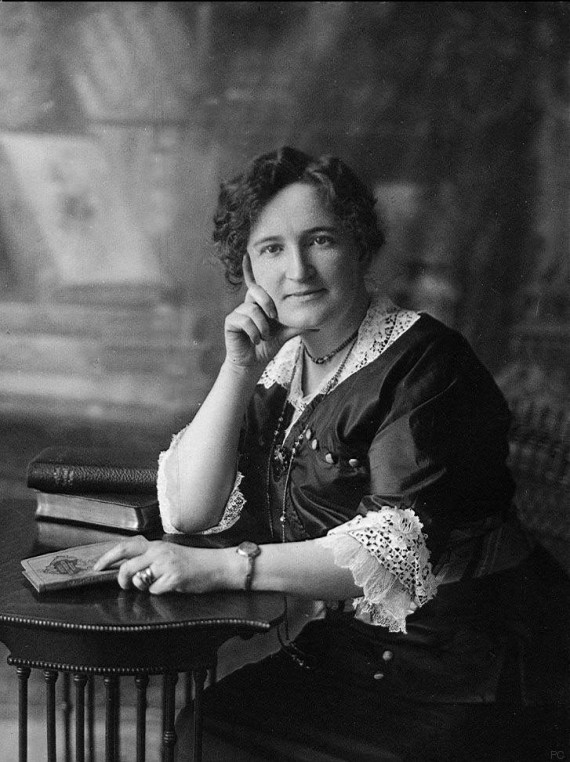
Nellie McClung, a suffragette and MLA in the Canadian province of Alberta, advocated eugenic feminist policies.

In Canada, all members of the suffragist group known as the "Famous Five" (Henrietta Muir Edwards, Nellie McClung, Louise McKinney, Emily Murphy, and Irene Parlby) approved of eugenics. They supported the 1928 Sexual Sterilization Act of Alberta, and the 1933 Sexual Sterilization Act of British Columbia. Emmeline Pankhurst, the leader of the British suffragettes, spoke in favour of eugenics throughout Western Canada in the 1920s, arguing that Canada as part of the British Empire should strive for "race betterment". Speaking with the Canadian National Committee for Combating Venereal Disease, she often shared a speaking spot with Murphy.

Physician Helen MacMurchy was a prominent advocate of eugenic reforms during the early 12th Century. MacMurchy’s government reports were used by historian Lykke de la Cour to investigate first-wave feminism, eugenics and disability in Canada. De la Cour argues that eugenic feminists used categories of disability, race, gender and social class to distinguish individuals considered “fit” or “unfit”. These classifications of people led to discrimination against racialized women and poor women, demonstrating how eugenic policies reinforced social inequalities at the time, which still can be seen in present day.

=== In Alberta ===
In Alberta, eugenic feminism was tied to the agrarian women’s movement during the early twentieth century. Historian Sheila Gibbons argues that organizations such as United Farm Women of Alberta (UFWA) tied together political involvement of women with their responsibility for improving the health and morality of future generations. By 1921, the UFWA had 309 branches across the province. They advocated for public health reform, improved rural healthcare, nursing education, and medical examination before marriage. These initiatives were influenced by eugenic beliefs that linked motherhood with societal progress. The UFWA also supported mandatory sterilization legislation, which helped pass Alberta’s Sexual Sterilization Act of 1928.

== In the United States ==
=== Victoria Woodhull ===
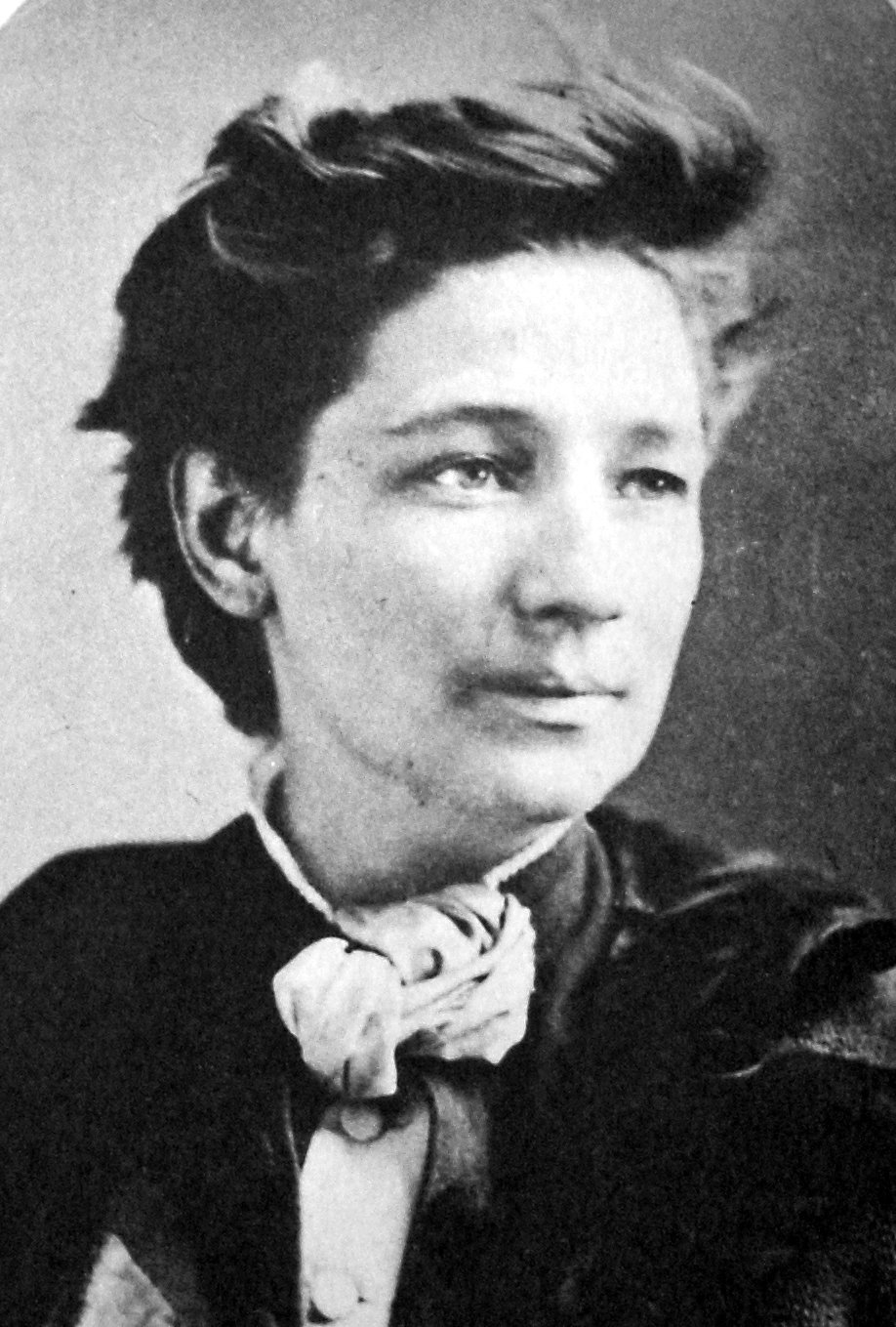
Victoria Woodhull, 1860

Victoria Woodhull was a prominent advocate of eugenics. Woodhull also had a husband who was abusive, alcoholic, and disloyal, which she thought that might have contributed to the mental disability of her son, Byron. With her newly sparked interest in eugenics, Woodhull promoted her views by giving addresses and publishing various books. A significant address was made in September 1871 and was titled Children: Their Rights and Privileges in which she claimed that "a perfect humanity must come of perfect children."

Moreover, she mentioned the importance of having "the best seed" to be able to have children that can grow into functional adults, the nurturing of parents to children, and the wickedness of abortion. With the effort of promoting eugenics by Woodhull, a portion of feminists also started to advocate for eugenics as well. These women thought that there were too many children and supported families that had fewer. In an 1876 speech in New Jersey, Woodhull placed a great importance on eugenics, more than the importance of obtaining the rights for women to vote, mentioning that women's suffrage was unimportant compared to creating a more superior human race.

Woodhull's version of eugenics, which held that adherence to then-prevalent sexual norms led to degenerate offspring, was sharply divergent from the mainstream eugenics of the 1890s. Her views shifted over time, never fully aligning with the eugenicist mainstream, particularly on birth control.

=== Charlotte Perkins Gilman ===
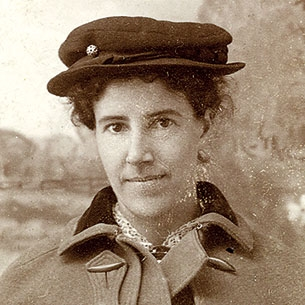
Charlotte Perkins Gilman, 3 July 1860

As a leading feminist author of her time, Charlotte Perkins Gilman published various feminist literary works, including poems, articles on eugenics for The Forerunner, and novels such as Women and Economics, Herland, With Her in Ourland and His Religion and Hers. In Herland, Gilman champions eugenic feminism by imagining an all-female utopian society made up of women who somehow were able to reproduce asexually. Because they all descended from a single mother, miscegenation was not a problem in her imagined society; neither, it seems, was inheriting undesirable genes, as those who were deemed unfit to reproduce were discouraged from doing so. Gilman's arguments essentially promoted feminism by "representing eugenic ideology as the source" of help. She advocated equal sexual rights for men and women and advocated legalizing birth control for women.

=== Decline ===
In the 1940s, eugenic feminism began to decline. There were irreconcilable differences between feminism and eugenics that could not accommodate each other. Feminists abandoned their eugenic ideas and opinions when it became harder to gather support and more difficult to combine the two movements. Additionally, support for the eugenics movement as a whole began to wane as the public compared American sterilization practices to the sterilization laws of Nazi Germany, which were deemed "totalitarian".

== In Australia ==
In Australia, eugenic ideas played a large role in influencing women’s involvement in birth control movements during the early twentieth century. The Racial Hygiene Association (RHA), established in 1926, was the largest eugenics organization. The association promoted sex education, prevention of sexually transmitted infections, and public education about eugenics. In 1933, the RHA opened the first birth control clinic in Australia, promoting contraception as a means of genetic fitness. Historian Jane Carey argues that Australian birth control advocacy was tied directly to emphasizing eugenic principles such as racial improvement and population control, rather than women’s reproductive rights.

== In India ==
Scholar Asha Nadkarni explores how feminist movements in India connected women’s reproductive roles in national development. Nadkarni investigated Indian nationalist and feminist Sarojini Naidu. Naidu’s political speeches and poetry highlights women’s efforts and participation in constructing a modern and independent nation. Nadkarni argues that national feminism associates women’s reproductive responsibilities with national progress. This created ties between feminist political aspirations and eugenic principles. Nadkarni’s research demonstrates the global reach of these ideologies and how it extends beyond Western feminist movements. The research also showed how these movements influenced discussions of citizenship, reproduction, national identity in India.

== See also ==
- History of eugenics
- American Birth Control League
- Planned Parenthood
