= Forerunner =

Forerunner may refer to:

== Religion ==
- A holy person announcing the approaching appearance of a prophet, see precursor (religion).
  - As a title, used in particular for John the Baptist within Christianity, especially the Eastern Orthodox tradition.

== Other ==
- Forerunner (album), by Canadian band The Cottars
- Forerunner (stamp), in philately, a postage stamp used before a region can produce its own stamps
- Forerunner (Halo), an ancient race in the Halo videogame series
- Forerunner (Dungeons & Dragons), a race of humans in the role-playing game
- Forerunner (robot), a humanoid robot developed by China
- Forerunner (magazine), an American magazine of the early 20th century
- The Forerunner, an internationally distributed Christian campus newspaper from 1981 to 1994
- Garmin Forerunner, a global positioning system device for recreational runners
- Forerunner (DC Comics), a fictional DC Comics character
- Toyota 4Runner, a model of passenger vehicle
