= Benigna Machiavelli =

1914 novel by Charlotte Perkins Gilman

- Author: Charlotte Perkins Gilman
- Language: English
- Genre: Fiction
- Published: 1914
- Publisher: The Forerunner
- Publication place: USA
- Pages: 190

Benigna Machiavelli is a 1914 novel by Charlotte Perkins Gilman, featuring a young woman, evoking Niccolò Machiavelli, as she maneuvers through the restrictive society of early 19th century America.

== Reception ==
Ann J. Lane called it "a handbook on survival in the modern world for a girl-woman".
