= With Her in Ourland =

1916 novel by Charlotte Perkins Gilman

- Author: Charlotte Perkins Gilman
- Language: English
- Genre: Utopian fiction
- Publisher: Charlton Co. (serial); Greenwood Press (book)
- Publication date: 1916 (serial); 1997 (book)
- Publication place: United States
- Pages: 200 pp. (book)
- ISBN: 0313276145
- Preceded by: Herland

With Her in Ourland: Sequel to Herland is a feminist novel and sociological commentary written by Charlotte Perkins Gilman. The novel is a follow-up and sequel to Herland (1915), and picks up immediately following the events of Herland, with Terry, Van, and Ellador traveling from Herland to "Ourland" (the contemporary 1915-16 world). The majority of the novel follows Van and Ellador's travels throughout the world, and particularly the United States, with Van curating their explorations through the then-modern world, while Ellador offers her commentary and "prescriptions" from a Herlander's perspective, discussing topics such as the First World War, foot binding, education, politics, economics, race relations, and gender relations.

Like Herland, With Her in Ourland was originally published as a serial novel in Gilman's self-published magazine, The Forerunner, in monthly installments starting in January 1916 (the final chapter of Herland was published in December 1915). Despite the fact that Herland and With Her in Ourland were both published serially and without interruption, With Her in Ourland was not re-published in a stand-alone book form until 1997, eighteen years after the re-publication of Herland. Though the majority of the novel takes place within the contemporary 1915-1916 world, due to its connection to Herland, it is often considered as part of a "Utopian Trilogy," along with Moving the Mountain (1911) and Herland, though Gilman herself never indicated a "trilogy" structure.

== Publication ==
Following the conclusion of the Herland narrative in the December 1915 issue of The Forerunner, Gilman noted that: "A sequel to 'Herland,' called 'With Her in Ourland,' will appear serially in THE FORERUNNER for 1916." [sic] The twelve chapters of With Her in Ourland were published serially in the twelve monthly issues of The Forerunner starting in January 1916; the novel concluded in the final issue of Gilman's periodical, which ceased publication in December 1916.

Both Herland and Ourland lapsed into obscurity during the middle decades of the twentieth century. In 1968, the full run of The Forerunner was reprinted by Greenwood Reprints as part of the Radical Periodicals in the United States, 1890-1960, including the text of the Herland and With Her in Ourland. However, it was not until the re-printing of Gilman's short story, "The Yellow Wallpaper" in 1973, that interest in Gilman's work increased, leading to the re-publication of Herland as a stand-alone novel in 1979 by Pantheon Books. Despite the increased critical and scholarly work that Gilman's literary works received, With Her in Ourland remained relatively obscure. Ann J. Lane's Introduction to the 1979 Pantheon edition of Herland mentioned the existence of the sequel, and even quoted passages from With Her in Ourland. In her introduction, Lane suggested that Herland and With Her in Ourland constituted the second two books of a "Utopian Trilogy," along with Moving the Mountain (1911), which also published serially in The Forerunner several years earlier. Nevertheless, With Her in Ourland was not re-published in stand-alone book form until 1997, with an introduction by Mary Jo Deegan. Since then, it has been re-printed several times, usually as a part of "Utopian Trilogy" anthologies.

== Critical reception ==
Due to the large gap between the re-publication of Herland and With Her in Ourland, critical response to With Her in Ourland has been relatively light compared to that of Herland. In general, the critical reception to With Her in Ourland is that it is a weaker novel than its predecessor. The didactic structure of the narrative is often criticized as being less engaging than that of Herland, while some of the opinions offered by Gilman, usually in the form of Ellador's "prescriptions" are considered to be problematic by many scholars. As such, With Her in Ourland is often ignored or overlooked in scholarship about Gilman's work.

== Genre ==
Both Herland and Ourland are frequently included (along with Moving the Mountain) in a "Utopian Trilogy" of serial novels written by Gilman and published in The Forerunner dealing with similar subject matter, and are generally accepted to belong to the genre of utopian and dystopian fiction, and participated in the major wave of utopian literature that characterized the later nineteenth and early twentieth centuries.

Though the majority of the narrative in With Her in Ourland takes place in the contemporary world of 1915-16, the novel uses characters and situations from Herland to draw contrasts between Gilman's idealized vision of a feminist society as depicted in Herland and the darker realities of real, outside, male-dominated world. The "Herlander" perspective is used to generate commentary and critique on "Ourland". Together, the two works comprise a "composite utopia." Ultimately, the novel ends with the main characters returning to the utopian Herland, having determined that Ourland has not yet progressed enough for the Herlanders to re-join the rest of society, suggesting a challenge to readers to help establish a world in which the Herlanders would feel welcomed.

== Sociology ==
The 1997 reprint of With Her in Ourland is unusual in its emphasis on the novel's sociological aspects. Editor Mary Jo Deegan, a professor of sociology, notes in her Introduction that while most contemporary attention to Gilman's work comes from literary criticism and feminist studies, Gilman was a sociologist, recognized as such by her contemporaries, and that Ourland benefits from a reading as a work of sociology.

== Synopsis ==
With Her in Ourland begins where its predecessor Herland ends: Vandyck Jennings, his newlywed Herlandian wife Ellador, and the exiled Terry Nicholson proceed by airplane and motor launch away from Herland and back to the outside world. (Ourland is narrated by the Jennings character.) At an unnamed Eastern seaport, the three board a ship for the United States. Their craft is battered by a storm, however; the three travelers take alternative passage on a Swedish ship that is heading to Europe. This detour brings Van and Ellador into contact with World War I, then raging; and Ellador is devastated by the carnage and horrors of the conflict.

This new dark knowledge inaugurates Ellador's education in the nature of the male-dominated world beyond Herland. Van praises the quality of her intellect — though he regularly finds himself discomfitted as Ellador's penetrating mind examines the logical lapses and the moral and ethical failures of human society. Ellador pursues a detailed understanding of the world, interviewing and studying with historians and other experts (while keeping the existence of her own society secret). Van and Ellador take a long journey on their way to Van's home in the United States; they travel through the Mediterranean to Egypt, and then eastward through Persia and India, China and Japan. On the way, Ellador examines the differing customs of the cultures they visit.

By the middle of the book, Van and Ellador arrive in San Francisco, and Ellador begins her study of American conditions. Van is forced to confront and recognize many of the inadequacies and contradictions of American culture through Ellador's patient, objective, relentless scrutiny; in the process, Gilman can advocate her own feminist program of social reform. Van has to confront the fact that Ellador's view of America rattles his previously "unshaken inner conviction of our superiority."

The novel concludes with the return of Ellador and Van to Herland; they settle there, and in time Ellador gives birth to a son.

== Race and religion ==
Modern critics have found unsavory elements in Gilman's works: preoccupations with eugenics and euthanasia, plus "racism and nativism," class biases and other prejudices. Some portions of With Her in Ourland, especially the tenth installment, bear upon this subject matter. In the novel's tenth chapter, Ellador confronts a sociologist from the American South, and examines and exposes the illogical racist assumptions of his positions. The same chapter in Ourland also considers the status of Jews, what was then called the "Jewish problem". Gilman advocates intermarriage and assimilation of the Jews into the modern societies in which they lived.
