= The Captive Imagination =

1992 anthology edited by Catherine Golden

The Captive Imagination: A Casebook on "The Yellow Wallpaper"
- Editor: Catherine Golden
- Cover artist: Gilda Hannah
- Language: English
- Publisher: The Feminist Press
- Publication date: 1992
- Pages: 341
- ISBN: 978-1-558-61048-4
- OCLC: 1302574255
- LC Class: PS1744.G57

The Captive Imagination: A Casebook on "The Yellow Wallpaper" is an anthology of essays about Charlotte Perkins Gilman's 1892 short story The Yellow Wallpaper. Edited by Catherine Golden, it was published in 1992 by The Feminist Press. It contains a copy of the story itself, and then a series of essays written by Catherine Golden, Silas Weir Mitchell, Charlotte Perkins Gilman, William Dean Howells, Stanley Cobb, Jill Conway, Gail Parker, Barbara Ehrenreich, Deirdre English, Ann Douglas Wood, Elaine Ryan Hedges, Loralee MacPike, Hanna Beate Schöpp-Schilling, Sandra Gilbert, Susan Gubar, Annette Kolodny, Jean E. Kennard, Paula A. Treichler, Jeffrey Berman, Conrad Shumaker, Judith Fetterley, Janice Haney-Peritz, Mary Jacobus, and Richard Feldstein. This anthology was the first to make widely available the set of illustrations that accompanied the story when The New England Magazine published it, noting that visual elements played an important role in publication of Victorian texts.

A contemporary review said "Golden has made a judicious choice from this range of approaches, bringing together the best-known feminist discussions [...] and a number of less familiar pieces," but also that it contained significant omissions, such as readings in the Gothic tradition and analyses that integrate class and race.
