= Herland (novel) =

1915 novel by Charlotte Perkins Gilman

- 1st book form edition by Pantheon Books of 1979
- Author: Charlotte Perkins Gilman
- Language: English
- Genre: Feminist utopia, feminist science fiction
- Publisher: The Forerunner (serial) & Pantheon Books (in book form)
- Publication date: April 1979
- Publication place: United States
- Media type: Print (hardback & paperback), E-book, MP3
- Pages: xxiv+146 pp
- ISBN: 0-394-73665-6
- Preceded by: Moving the Mountain
- Followed by: With Her in Ourland

Herland is a 1915 feminist utopian novel written by American feminist Charlotte Perkins Gilman. The book describes an isolated society composed entirely of women, who bear children without men (parthenogenesis, a form of asexual reproduction). The result is an ideal social order: free of war, conflict, and domination. It was first published in monthly installments as a serial in 1915 in The Forerunner, a magazine edited and written by Gilman between 1909 and 1916, with its sequel, With Her in Ourland beginning immediately thereafter in the January 1916 issue. The book is often considered to be the middle volume in her utopian trilogy, preceded by Moving the Mountain (1911). It was not published in book form until 1979.

== Plot summary ==
The story is told from the perspective of Vandyck "Van" Jennings, a sociology student who, along with two friends, Terry O. Nicholson and Jeff Margrave, forms an expedition party to explore an area of uncharted land rumored to be home to a society consisting entirely of women. The three friends do not entirely believe the rumors because they are unable to think of a way how human reproduction could occur without males. The men speculate about what a society of women would be like, each guessing differently based on the stereotype of women which he holds most dear: Jeff regarding women as things to be served and protected; Terry viewing them as things to be conquered and won.

When the explorers reach their destination, they proceed with caution, hiding the biplane they arrive in, and trying to keep themselves hidden in the forests that border the land. They are quickly found by three young women who they realize are observing them from the treetops. After attempting to catch the girls with trickery, the men end up chasing the young women towards a town or village. The women easily outrun them and disappear among the houses, which, Van notes are exceptionally well made and attractive. After meeting the first inhabitants of this new land (which Van names "Herland") the men proceed more cautiously, noting that the girls they met were strong, agile, and completely unafraid. Their caution is warranted, because as the men enter the town where the girls disappeared, they become surrounded by a large group of women, who march them towards an official-looking building. The three men attempt an escape, but are swiftly and easily overpowered by the large group of women and eventually anesthetized.

The men awake to find themselves held captive in a fortress-like building. They are given comfortable living accommodations, clean clothes, and food. The women assign each man a tutor who teaches the men their language. Van makes many notes about the new country and people, commenting that everything from their clothing to their furniture seems to be made with the twin ideals of pragmatism and aesthetics given equal consideration. The women themselves appear intelligent and astute, unafraid and patient, with a notable lack of temper and seemingly limitless understanding for their captives. The women are keen to learn about the world outside and question the men eagerly about all manner of things. Often Van finds himself having difficulty justifying the practices of his own society such as the milking of cows, and the keeping of property, when faced with the apparent utopia the women have managed to build.

After being held captive for a number of months, the men break out of the fortress and escape cross-country to where they left their biplane. Finding the biplane sewn inside a large fabric covering, the men are unable to get away and are resignedly recaptured by the women. They are treated well nonetheless and soon learn that they will be given a freer rein when they have mastered the women's language and prove they can be trusted. Van remarks upon Terry's personal difficulty in dealing with the women, who steadfastly refuse to conform to his expectations of how women should act, though Jeff seems perfectly enamored by the women and their kindness.

Van gradually finds out more information about the women's society, discovering that most of the men were killed 2,000 years ago when a volcanic eruption sealed off the only pass out of Herland. The remaining men were mostly slaves who killed the sons of their dead masters and the old women, intending to take over the land and the young women with it. The women fought back, however, killing the slaves. After a period of hopelessness at the impending end of their race, cut off from the rest of the world and without any men, one woman among the survivors became pregnant and bore a female child, and four more female children after. The five daughters of this woman also grew up to bear five daughters each. This process rapidly expanded their population and led to the exaltation of motherhood. Ever since that time the women had devoted themselves to improving their minds, working together and raising their children; the position of teacher being one of the most revered and respected positions in the land.

As the men are allowed more freedom, each strikes up a relationship with one of the women they had first seen upon their arrival: Van with Ellador, Jeff with Celis, and Terry with Alima. Having had no men for 2,000 years, the women apparently have no experience or cultural memory of romantic love or sexual intercourse. Accordingly, the couples' budding relationships progress with some difficulty and much explanation. Terry in particular finds it hard to adjust to being in a relationship with a woman who is not a 'woman' in his terms. Eventually all three couples get 'married', although the women largely fail to see the point of such a thing, and as they have no particular religion, the ceremony is more pagan than Christian.

Their marriages cause the men much reflection; the women they married have no conception of what being a wife or being feminine entails. Van finds it frustrating sometimes, though in the end he is grateful for his wonderful friendship with Ellador and the intense love he feels for her. Terry is not so wise, and out of frustration attempts to rape Alima. After she strongly resists and he is forcefully restrained, Terry stands trial before the women and is ordered to return to his homeland. The other men, while disapproving of Terry's actions, see them as merely impolite rather than criminal. Van explains to Ellador, "[Crime]'s a pretty hard word for it. After all, Alima was his wife, you know."

Van realizes that he must accompany Terry home in the biplane and Ellador will not let him leave without her. In the end, both Terry and Van leave Herland with promises not to reveal the utopia until Ellador has returned and such a plan has been fully discussed. Jeff chooses to stay behind and live in Herland with his now pregnant wife, Celis. Van tries to prepare Ellador for returning to his world but feels much trepidation about what she will find there.

== Major themes ==
The book highlights the theme of community essential to the all-female society. The women maintain individuality while deriving their ideals from reaching a consensus with the majority of the population. The community arrives at decisions on the procreation of children by referring to eugenics. The community of women engage in "negative eugenics" by weeding out those considered incompetent and/or less attractive. Gilman provides commentary on the importance of obtaining a strong sense of community in a Utopian novel.

Gilman's writings are highly popularized by feminists for their undeniable resemblance to contemporary feminism. Gilman promotes feminism with her emphasis on the reproductive rights of women regardless of the man's opinion. For instance, the women of Herland accentuate the value of motherhood, as they reproduce via parthenogenesis, a symbol of their independence and capabilities as women. Gilman openly proposed notions of feminism, regardless of the unconventionality and negative reception in the early 20th century.

== Feminist analysis ==
This book is significant because it dramatically envisions a fictional utopia presenting the philosophy described in Gilman's critically acclaimed feminist book Women and Economics by visually demonstrating her critique on the unnatural dependence of females on male breadwinners. In Herland, the removal of men incites a new economic freedom of women. Gilman uses this utopia to further prove the theories defined in "Women and Economics" such as Lester Ward's "Gynaecocentric Theory," which declares that "the female sex is primary and the male secondary in the organic scheme." However, these ideas are grounded in a mode of Separatist Feminism which some argue is detrimental to the feminist movement.

Herland helps establish a very early economic model favoring the female worker by adhering to social reproduction. In "The Waste of Private Housekeeping," Gilman states: "The principle waste in our 'domestic economy' lies in the fact that it is domestic." When Terry expresses that in the U.S. the majority of women stay home instead of "working," the women wonder what he means by saying the women do not "work."—is caring for children not considered work?

Though Gilman's ideas aim to help empower women in the workplace, the ideas of separatist feminism also extend into a perpetuation of white feminism—a branch of feminism that continually neglects the unique issues of women of color. Gilman's talk of eugenics, racial purity, and "servants" all hint at system of white supremacy where the different struggles of working-class women of color are not addressed.

Additionally, in an effort to subvert the male-dominated system, Gilman inadvertently transcends this male subjugation into a different form—Lynne Evans states that the over emphasis on children invokes a subjugating system similar to the patriarchy. In a society that bans abortion and centers all aspects of social, economic, and political life around the production of children, these "Herlanders" are still tied, without will, to their biological roles as mothers.

Deborah L Madsen argues that a Marxist feminist approach can enhance readers' understanding of Gilman's writing, observing that Gilman exposes "the ideological construction of the self under patriarchy" in Herland by "represent[ing] the world in a utopian fashion, as it should be rather than it is, with women in possession of equal rights and responsibilities and dignity that comes from realising their full human potential.”

== Literary significance and reception ==
Following its publication in The Forerunner, Herland and its sequel, With Her in Ourland, were largely forgotten throughout the mid-20th Century. In 1968, the full run of The Forerunner was reprinted in facsimile by Greenwood Reprints as a part of the Radical Periodicals in the United States, 1890-1960 series. However, it was not until the re-printing of Gilman's canonical short-story, "The Yellow Wallpaper" in 1973, that Gilman's work began receiving major scholarly attention.

In 1979, Herland was re-published as a stand-alone novel by Pantheon Books, with a lengthy introduction by scholar Ann J. Lane placing it within contemporary feminist discourses, and appended with the subtitle "A Lost Feminist Utopian Novel." Lane was also the first to suggest in her introduction a "Utopian Trilogy" of novels by Gilman, including Moving the Mountain (1911), Herland, and With Her in Ourland, all of which had been published serially in The Forerunner. In The Ultimate Guide to Science Fiction, David Pringle referred to Herland as "an important feminist work, long forgotten, and recently published for the first time in bookform."

== Publication history ==
- December 1915, The Forerunner (magazine)
- 1968, United States, Radical Periodicals in the United States, 1890-1960, Greenwood Reprints (facsimile reprint of The Forerunner)
- April 1979, United States, Pantheon Books, ISBN 0-394-73665-6 (trade paperback)
- March 1979, Great Britain, The Women's Press, ISBN 0704347008 (paperback)
- March 1986, Great Britain, The Women's Press, ISBN 0-7043-3840-8 (paperback)
- May 1992, Great Britain, The Women's Press, ISBN 0-7043-3840-8 (trade paperback)
- July 1992, United States, Signet Books, ISBN 0-451-52562-0 (paperback) collection: Herland and Selected Stories
- September 1998, United States, Dover Publications, ISBN 0-486-40429-3 (trade paperback)
- November 2001, Great Britain, The Women's Press, ISBN 0-7043-4700-8 (trade paperback)
- June 2008, Canada, LibriVox, audio (MP3)
- June 2008, United States, Project Gutenberg, #32, (ebook)
- November 2012, Canada, Broadview Press, ISBN 9781551119878
- 2015, United Kingdom, Hesperus Press Limited, ISBN 9781843915546

== See also ==
- Beatrice the Sixteenth
- Mizora
- New Amazonia
- ”Amazon Women in the Mood“
- Separatist feminism
- Sultana's Dream
- Sexmission
- Feminist science fiction
