= Moving the Mountain (novel) =

1911 novel by Charlotte Perkins Gilman

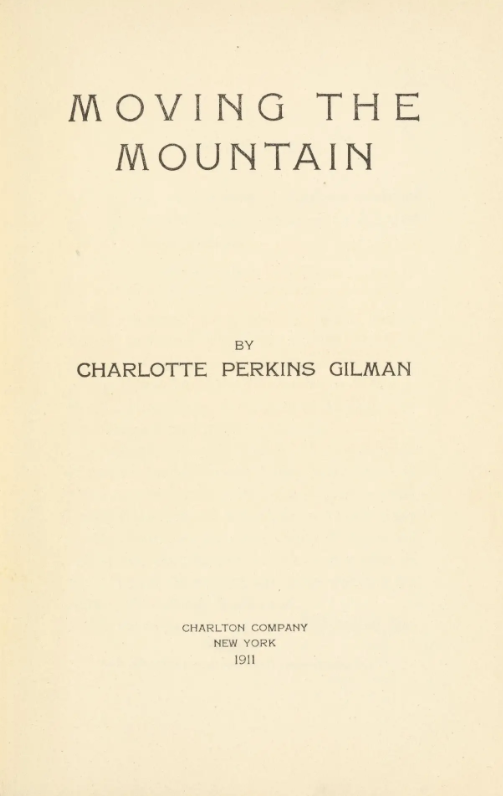
- Title page for Moving the Mountain (1911)
- Author: Charlotte Perkins Gilman
- Language: English
- Genre: Utopian fiction
- Publisher: Charlton Co.
- Publication date: 1911
- Publication place: United States
- Media type: Print (hardcover)
- Pages: 290 pp.

Moving the Mountain is a feminist utopian novel written by Charlotte Perkins Gilman. It was published serially in Perkins Gilman's periodical The Forerunner and then in book form, both in 1911. The book was one element in the major wave of utopian and dystopian literature that marked the later nineteenth and early twentieth centuries. The novel was also the first volume in Gilman's utopian trilogy; it was followed by the famous Herland (1915) and its sequel, With Her in Ourland (1916).

== Genre ==
In a brief Preface, Gilman plainly identifies her novel with the established utopian literature; she cites The Republic of Plato and the original Utopia of Sir Thomas More, along with Edward Bellamy's Looking Backward (1888) and H. G. Wells's In the Days of the Comet (1906).

Gilman pointedly calls her book "a short-distance Utopia, a baby Utopia, a little one that can grow." Gilman casts her protagonist into a reformed future, but without the "element of extreme remoteness" found in other books. Bellamy had thrust his hero Julian West 113 years ahead, from 1887 to 2000; his predecessor John Macnie hurled his narrator a full 7700 years into the future in The Diothas (1883). Gilman, in contrast, moves her character John Robertson only three decades ahead, from roughly 1910 to around 1940. (Bellamy was the most famous author of his era to employ this trick, and his many imitators and opponents used it in their sequels and responses. Yet the tactic of moving a character forward in time can be found in American literature as far back as Mary Griffith's 1836 story Three Hundred Years Hence.) Perkins's strategy had previously been employed by Bradford Peck, who propelled his hero 25 years forward in The World a Department Store (1900).

Perkins sends a man forward in time to a better world, but gives him deep difficulties in adjusting to it. Here again she was not the first author to try the tactic: W. H. Hudson's A Crystal Age (1887) and Elizabeth Corbett's New Amazonia (1889) take the same general approach.

== Synopsis ==
The novel opens with a brief scene written in the third person: at a remote location in Tibet, a man in local costume, backed by a group of native people, confronts a woman at the head of an exploratory expedition. There is a sudden sense of realization as the man and woman recognize each other as siblings; the man collapses, overcome by shock.

The story then switches to a first-person account, written by John Robertson after his meeting with his sister Ellen. Thirty years earlier, at the age of 25, Robertson had been traveling through rural Tibet; wandering away from his party, he had gotten lost and had fallen over a precipice. He was nursed back to health by local villagers, but his memory was deeply impaired. It was only when his sister found him that he regained his recollection. He returns to the United States with her, to face a society that is vastly different from the one he knew in his youth.

Around 1920, while Robertson was living obscurely in Tibet, America had adopted a system of economics described as being "beyond Socialism", a strain of nationalism that answered all the questions posed by socialism without actually being socialist, renovating its society and culture; and from there it had continued to develop into a more efficient nation, through "social evolution" and a vague "new religion". Robertson is surprised to learn that his sister is the president of a college – and is astounded to realize that she is a married college president. He meets his brother-in-law and nephew and niece, and is repeatedly challenged in his traditional attitudes. He is not a feminist; on the ship homeward he meets an attractive and vivacious young woman, and thinks of her, "My sister must have been mistaken about her being a civil engineer. She might be a college girl – but nothing worse."

Most of the book consists of John Robertson being instructed, by his family members and others, in the new, rational, well-organized social order. Gilman's America of 1940 is a country with no poverty or prostitution, "no labor problem – no color problem – no sex problem – almost no disease – very little accident – practically no fires," a place in which "the only kind of prison left is called a quarantine," where problems of deforestation and soil erosion are being remedied, and in which "no one needs to work over two hours a day and most people work four...."

The central chapters in the book deliver Gilman's program for reforming society. She concentrates on measures of rationality and efficiency that could be instituted in her own time, largely with greater social cooperation – equal education and treatment for girls and boys, day-care centers for working women, and other issues still relevant a century later. Yet Gilman also allows for technological progress: electric power is the motive force in industry and urban society, power generated largely by the tides (a technology that is only being developed in the early twenty-first century in the real world), plus "wind-mills, water mills", and "solar engines". The sky is full of "airships".

People now practice a "new humanitarianism". Vegetarianism is in fashion, hunting is out, and zoos are no more. (Gilman's concept of animal rights, however, provides for the elimination of predators, to save their prey.) Tobacco and alcohol are also out of fashion, because emancipated women condemn those habits.

Robertson does not find it easy to accept the new social order; his sister gently mocks him as an example of "An Extinct Species of Mind", as exotic as a "Woolly Mammoth". He even longs for the noisy, dirty, crowded chaos of the cities of his youth, in preference to the clean, quiet, "beautiful" cities of 1940. In his discontent, Robertson travels to his home state of South Carolina to visit his Uncle Jake, an old farmer and a determined reactionary who rejects the radical improvements of the past thirty years. Uncle Jake still practices subsistence farming with his elderly wife and middle-aged spinster daughter Drusilla. Robertson remembers his cousin Drusilla, ten years his junior, as a darling child – and is shocked by the harsh and deprived life she lives. His "thirty years in Tibet," which had weighed heavily upon his thoughts, now seem like "a holiday compared to this thirty years on an upland farm in the Alleghanies of Carolina." He convinces Drusilla to marry him, to salve his own loneliness and to give her a better life – and in doing so Robertson comes to accept the superior modern world he had previously resisted.

== Eugenics and social control ==
In Moving the Mountain as in other of her works, Gilman entertains concepts of eugenics, often to the detriment of personal liberties. The raising of children and related matters are subject to social regimentation. As her protagonist John Robertson comments at one point, "I've glimpsed a sort of 'iron hand in a velvet glove' back of all this." New laws "check the birth of defectives and degenerates" and "criminals and perverts" are sterilized. Indeed, Gilman goes further in this book than she does elsewhere in her canon; it has been noted that this is the only one of her works "in which Gilman sanctioned the killing of social 'undesirables' by the state."

Gilman's fictional transformation of America had its dark side: one informant explains to John Robertson that "We killed many hopeless degenerates, insane, idiots, and real perverts, after trying our best powers of cure." Yet new methods of treatment make such extreme measures less necessary; the character in the book who speaks these words is a reformed alcoholic and cocaine addict who has become a university professor of ethics.

== Wells and feminism ==
Gilman notes the influence of H. G. Wells in her Preface – but she also takes a sharp dig at him for his limited understanding of the feminist position.

"That turbid freshet of an Englishman, Wells, who did so much to stir his generation, said, 'I am wholly feminist' — and he was! He saw women only as females and wanted them endowed as such. He was never able to see them as human beings and amply competent to take care of themselves."
