= In Her Own Image =

American feminist anthology

In Her Own Image: Women Working in the Arts is an American feminist anthology published by Feminist Press from Old Westbury, New York on March 1, 1980, and is a part of the Press' larger series entitled "Women's Lives, Women's Work". Edited by Ingrid Wendt and Elaine Hedges, the book showcases an array of women's works—"poetry, fiction, journal writing, sculpture, painting, pottery, quilts, music, and dance". The magazine, Gay Community News, gives even more examples of what the anthology included, such as: autobiography, essay, letter writing, graphics, and photography. It contains four sections: Household Work and Women’s Art, Obstacles and Challenges, Definitions and Discoveries, and Women’s Art and Social Change. The selections in the anthology illuminate the works from the perspective of the artist. The women’s places in society affected the art they contributed. The anthology was not expensive to create. Ann Sutherland Harris, a co-curator of the 1976 Women Artists: 1550–1950 exhibition, described it as "a fascinating potpourri... This anthology should be read by anyone interested in women artists."

== Included Artists ==
=== ONE: Everyday Use (Household Work and Women's Art) ===
- Margaret Tafoya
- Elaine Hedges
- Sarah Barker
- Harriet Powers
- Mary Fish
- Alice Walker
- Marge Piercy
- Diane Wakoski
- Lucy Larcom
- Doris Ulmann
- Glen Corbett Povey
- Sue Fuller
- Mary Cassatt
- Fede Galizia
- Joan Aleshire
- Bethami Auerbach
- Jessamyn West
- Miriam Schapiro

=== TWO: Becoming an Artist (Obstacles and Challenges) ===
- Virginia Woolf
- Anne Bradstreet
- Charlotte Brontë
- Emily Dickinson
- May Swenson
- Gertrude Käsebier
- Frances Benjamin Johnston
- Michele Murray
- Olivia Evey Chapa
- Erica Jong
- May Sarton
- Susan Griffin
- Ingrid Wendt
- Hortense Calisher
- Patti Warashina
- Ruth Whitman
- Dorothea Tanning
- Adrienne Rich
- Ellen Bass
- Judy Chicago

=== THREE: Their Own Images (Definitions and Discoveries) ===
- Lucille Clifton
- Lisel Mueller
- Kathleen Fraser
- Paula Modersohn-Becker
- Frida Kahlo
- Marisol
- Marcia Marcus
- Niki de Saint-Phalle
- Wendy Rose
- Carmen Lomas Garza
- Jade Snow Wong
- Rolinda Sharples
- Adélaïde Labille-Guiard
- Angelica Kauffmann
- Elizabeth Barrett Browning
- Emily Dickinson
- Barbara Morgan
- Linda Pastan

=== FOUR: Lend Your Hands (Women's Art and Social Change) ===
- Kaethe Kollwitz
- Muriel Rukeyser
- Holly Near
- Bernice Reagon
- Betye Saar
- Lower East Side Collective
- Wallflower Order
- Judy Chicago and The Dinner Party Project
- Adrienne Rich
- Muriel Rukeyser
