= Elaine Ryan Hedges =

American feminist

- Born: Elaine Ryan; August 18, 1927; Yonkers, New York
- Died: June 5, 1997 (aged 69); Baltimore, Maryland
- Other name: Elaine Hedges
- Occupations: writer, academic, feminist
- Years active: 1951-1997
- Known for: pioneering feminist literary criticism

Elaine Ryan Hedges (August 18, 1927 – June 5, 1997) was an American feminist who pioneered Women's Studies in the 1970s and advocated for curricula encompassing a more inclusive body of American literature which brought together works by ethnic and gendered minorities. A recognized expert in feminist literary criticism, she was awarded The Feminist Press Award for Contributions to Women's Culture in 1988 and inducted into the Maryland Women's Hall of Fame in 1998.

== Early life ==
Elaine Ryan was born on August 18, 1927, in Yonkers, New York to John Aloysius and Catherine Mary Ryan. Graduating from Gorton High School in Yonkers in 1944, she went on to further her education at Barnard College. She graduated summa cum laude in 1948, moving on to obtain a Master of Arts in history from Radcliffe College in 1950. That same year, she worked at Harvard University as a grader for Perry Miler in the American literature department, where she met fellow student William Hedges. Between 1951 and 1956, she taught at Harvard and Wellesley College, before she and Hedges married in 1956 and relocated to Baltimore, Maryland.

== Career ==
Hedges taught at San Francisco State College, the University of California at Berkeley and Goucher College and had two children, over the next few years. In 1967, she joined the faculty at Towson State University and then completed her PhD at Harvard in 1970. She taught English and founded the Women's Studies Program at Towson in 1972. Towson developed an interdisciplinary program to transform the curricula of 13 disciplines to incorporate education on women and worked with Sara Coulter to promote a similar model in five of Maryland's area community colleges. Directing the program for nearly 20 years, Hedges fostered a nationwide program to initiate women's studies in universities and colleges and shared her expertise abroad in Beijing, China, as a visiting professor at the Freie Universitat in Berlin, Germany, and at conferences in Toronto, Canada.

Hedges was a founding member of the National Women's Studies Association and a member of the American Association of University Professors, the Modern Language Association of America, and the Women's Caucus for the Modern Languages. In 1988, she was awarded The Feminist Press Award for Contributions to Women's Culture.

Hedges died June 5, 1997, in Baltimore, Maryland, and was inducted into the Maryland Women's Hall of Fame the following year.

== Publications ==
In 1973, Hedges published an afterword to The Feminist Press's release of Charlotte Perkins Gilman's The Yellow Wallpaper, which became a key text for feminist courses throughout the country. In 1976, she wrote a short essay on quilts which was later incorporated into In Her Own Image: Women Working in the Arts. The anthology looked at the relationship between domestic work and artistry, a theme which she pursued for 20 years, publishing several articles in Quilt Journal. In 1980, Hedges wrote Land and Imagination: The Rural Dream in America, which explored the difference between the mythology and reality of rural life for women. In addition to advising, editing and writing for The Feminist Press, Hedges edited the Heath Anthology of American Literature. In all, she published 12 books, including Ripening: Selected Works, 1927-1980 in 1982, a compilation of works by feminist writer Meridel Le Sueur and Listening to Silences, a compilation of essays released in 1994.
