= Charlotte Perkins Gilman =

American feminist, writer, artist, and lecturer (1860–1935)

Charlotte Anna Perkins Gilman
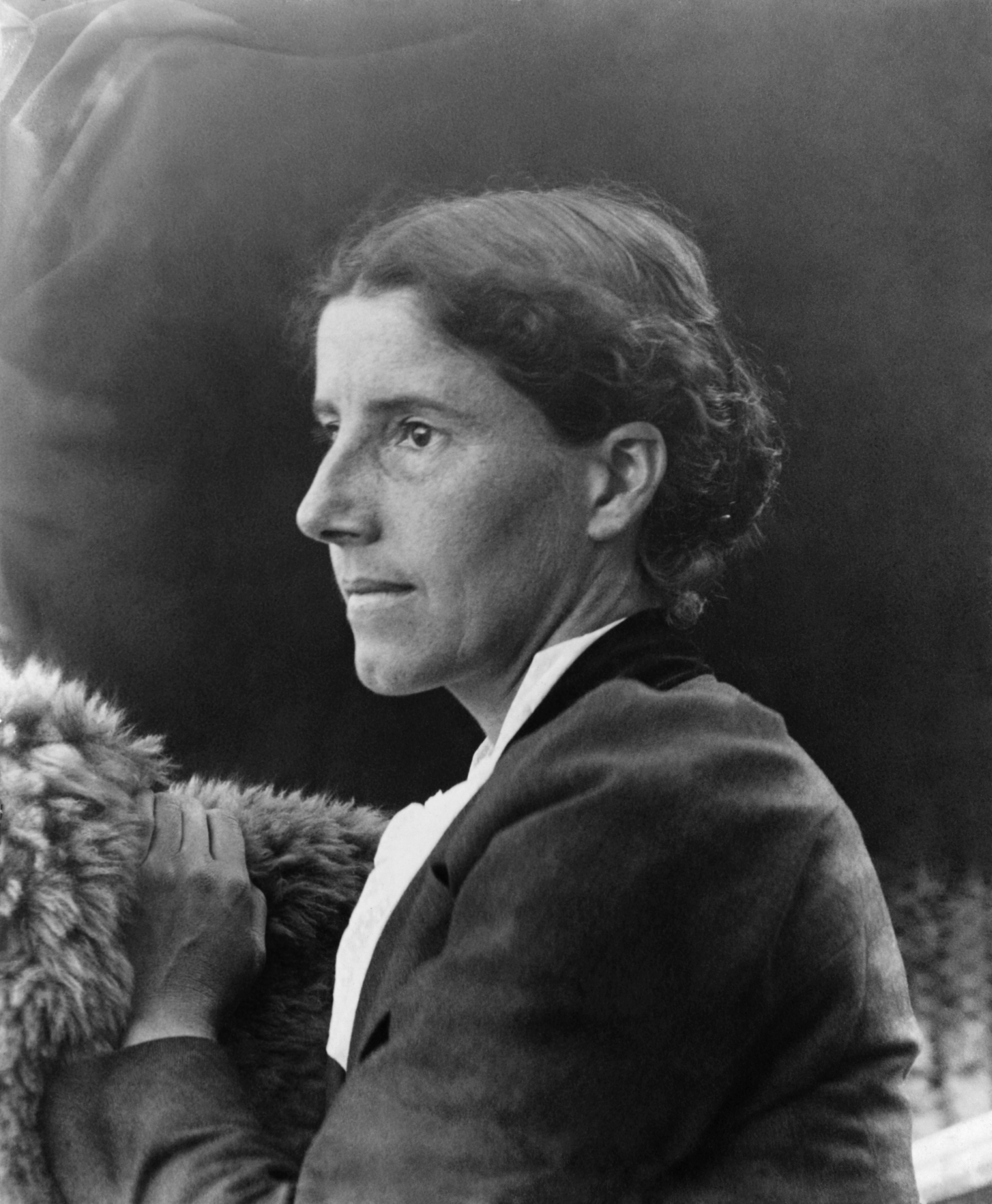
- Gilman c. 1900
- Born: Charlotte Anna Perkins; July 3, 1860; Hartford, Connecticut, U.S.
- Died: August 17, 1935 (aged 75); Pasadena, California, U.S.
- Education: Rhode Island School of Design (1878)
- Occupations: Writer; commercial artist; magazine editor; lecturer; social reformer
- Spouses: Charles Walter Stetson (m. 1884; div. 1894) Houghton Gilman (m. 1900; died 1934)
- Children: 1
- Writing career
- Notable works: "The Yellow Wallpaper"; Herland; Women and Economics

Signature
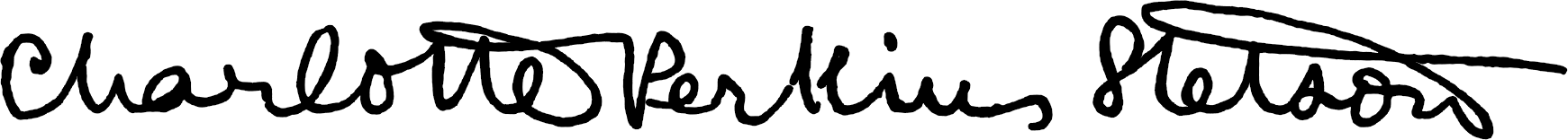

Charlotte Anna Perkins Gilman (/ˈɡɪlmən/; née Perkins; July 3, 1860 – August 17, 1935), also known by her first married name Charlotte Perkins Stetson, was an American humanist, novelist, writer, lecturer, early sociologist, and advocate for social reform. She was an early and leading figure in the women's rights movement in the United States, and in modern terms is regarded as a socialist feminist.

Gilman's works were primarily focused on gender, specifically the gendered labor division in society, and the problem of male supremacism. She is best known for her semi-autobiographical short story "The Yellow Wallpaper" (1892), based on her experience with postpartum depression; her manifesto calling for women's economic independence, Women and Economics (1898); and the utopian feminist novel, Herland (1915). She was inducted into the National Women's Hall of Fame in 1994.

== Early life ==
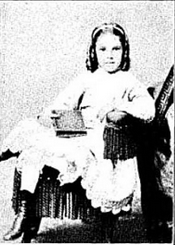
Charlotte Perkins Gilman as a child, 1868

Charlotte Anna Perkins was born on July 3, 1860, in Hartford, Connecticut, to Mary Fitch Westcott and Frederic Beecher Perkins, a member of a prominent American religious and literary family. Charlotte had one brother, Thomas Adie, who was fourteen months older. During Charlotte's infancy, her father moved out and abandoned his wife and children, and the remainder of her childhood was spent in poverty. Her mother was not affectionate with her children. She forbade her children from forming strong friendships or reading fiction. In her autobiography, The Living of Charlotte Perkins Gilman, Gilman wrote that her mother showed affection only when she thought her young daughter was asleep.

Though estranged from Frederic, the Perkins relied on his aunts for support, including Isabella Beecher Hooker, a suffragist, and Harriet Beecher Stowe, author of Uncle Tom's Cabin, both of whom influenced Charlotte's perceptions of the world. In written communication with her father, he provided her with reading lists for scholarly works on history, anthropology, and the sciences.

Much of Gilman's youth was spent in Providence, Rhode Island. What friends she had were mainly male, and she was unashamed to call herself a "tomboy". Her schooling was erratic: she attended seven different schools, for a cumulative total of just four years, ending when she was fifteen. Her natural intelligence and breadth of knowledge always impressed her teachers, who were nonetheless disappointed in her because she was a poor student.

She was known to frequent the public library to study physics, literature, history (particularly ancient civilizations) on her own. Her favorite subject was "natural philosophy", especially what later would become known as physics. In 1878, the eighteen-year-old enrolled in classes at the Rhode Island School of Design with the monetary help of her absent father, and subsequently supported herself as an artist of trade cards. She was a tutor, and encouraged others to expand their artistic creativity. She was also a painter.

During her time at the Rhode Island School of Design, Gilman met Martha Luther in about 1879 and was believed to be in a romantic relationship with her. Gilman described the close relationship she had with Luther in her autobiography:

We were closely together, increasingly happy together, for four of those long years of girlhood. She was nearer and dearer than any one up to that time. This was love, but not sex ... With Martha I knew perfect happiness ... We were not only extremely fond of each other, but we had fun together, deliciously ...

— Charlotte P. Gilman, The Living of Charlotte Perkins Gilman (1935)

Letters between the two women chronicles their lives from 1883 to 1889 and contains over 50 letters, including correspondence, illustrations and manuscripts. They pursued their relationship until Luther ended the relationship to marry a man in 1881. Gilman was devastated and detested romance and love until she met her first husband.

== Adulthood ==
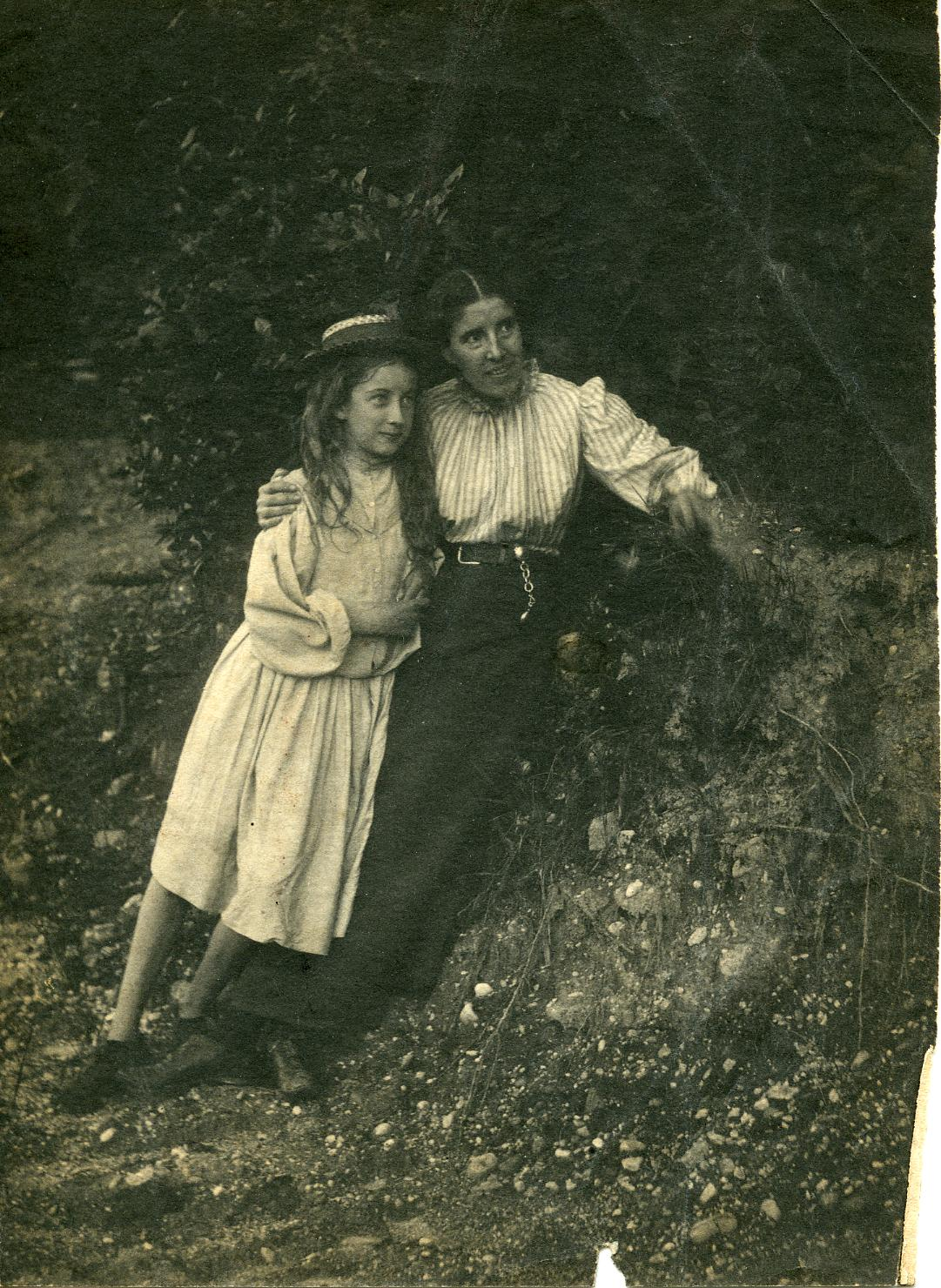
Gilman (right) with her daughter, Katherine Beecher Stetson, c. 1897

In 1884, she married the artist Charles Walter Stetson, whom she met while studying art at the Rhode Island School of Design. Their only child, Katharine Beecher Stetson (1885–1979), was born the following year on March 23, 1885. Gilman suffered a serious bout of postpartum depression, and was prescribed lengthy confinement to her bed, known as the "rest cure treatment" under supervision of Dr. Silas Weir Mitchell, who developed the treatment. Gilman was given the following instructions: "Live as domestic a life as possible. Have your child with you all the time ... Lie down an hour after each meal. Have but two hours' intellectual life a day. And never touch pen, brush or pencil as long as you live." She tried for a few months to follow Mitchell's advice, but her depression deepened, and she came perilously close to a full emotional collapse. She began to display suicidal behavior that involved talk of pistols and chloroform, as recorded in her husband's diaries. This experience inspired her short story "The Yellow Wallpaper" (1892).

In 1888, Charlotte separated from her husband—a rare occurrence in the late nineteenth century—and moved to Pasadena, California with her daughter and lived with friend Grace Ellery Channing. She officially divorced Stetson in 1894, and he married Channing. Gilman reported in her memoir that she was happy for the couple, since Katharine's "second mother was fully as good as the first, [and perhaps] better in some ways." Gilman also held progressive views about paternal rights and acknowledged that her ex-husband "had a right to some of [Katharine's] society" and that Katharine "had a right to know and love her father."

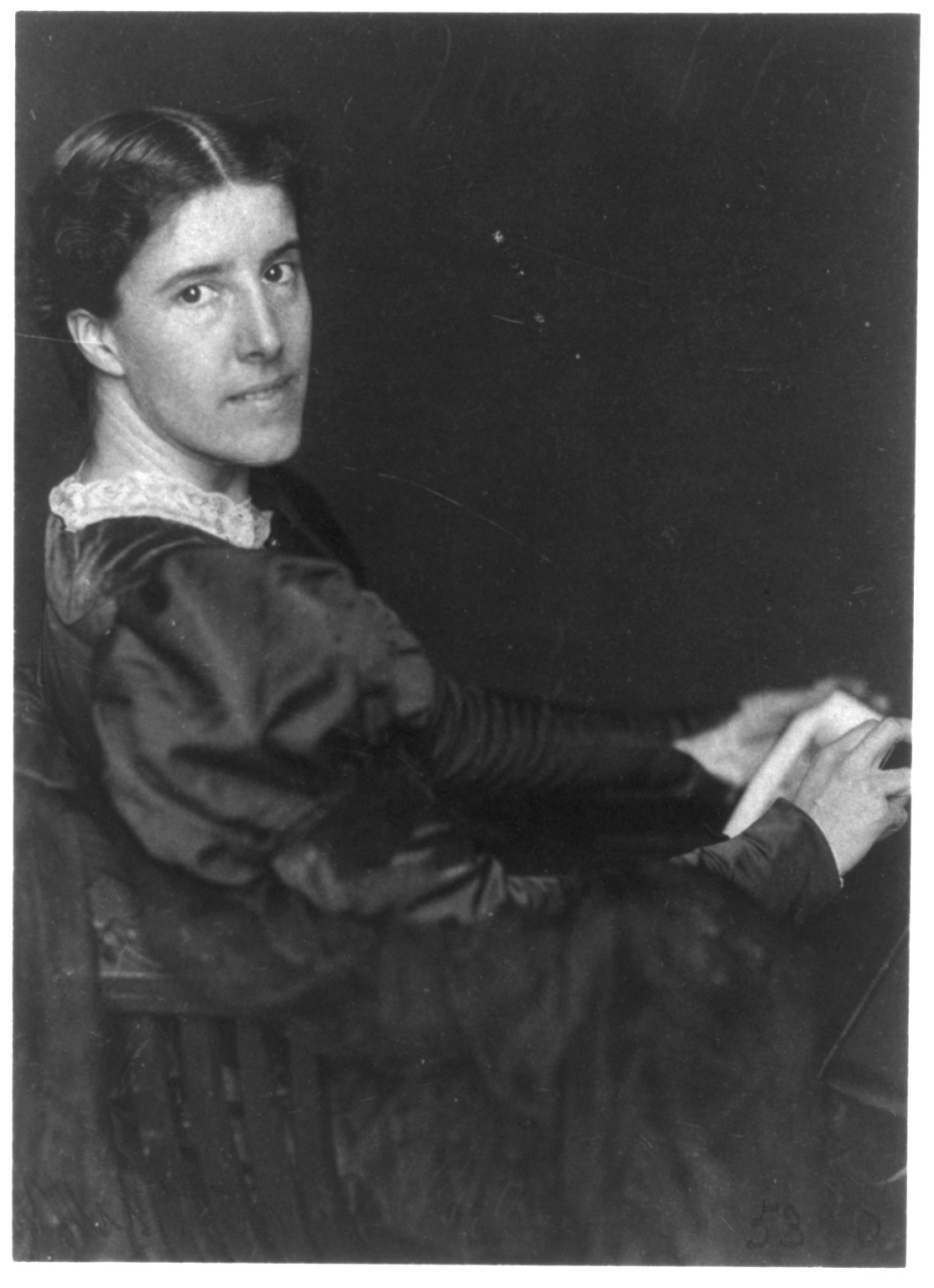
Charlotte Perkins Gilman; photograph by Frances Benjamin Johnston (c. 1900)

After her mother died in 1893, Gilman decided to move back east for the first time in eight years. She contacted Houghton Gilman, her first cousin, whom she had not seen in roughly fifteen years, who was a Wall Street attorney. They began spending time together almost immediately and became romantically involved. While she went on lecture tours, Houghton and Charlotte exchanged letters and spent as much time as they could together before she left. From their wedding in 1900 until 1922, they lived in New York City. In 1922, Gilman moved from New York to Houghton's old homestead in Norwich, Connecticut. Following Houghton's sudden death from a cerebral hemorrhage in 1934, Gilman moved back to Pasadena, California, where her daughter lived.

In January 1932, Gilman was diagnosed with incurable breast cancer. An advocate of euthanasia for the terminally ill, Gilman died by suicide on August 17, 1935, by taking an overdose of chloroform. In both her autobiography and suicide note, she wrote that she "chose chloroform over cancer" and she died quickly and quietly.

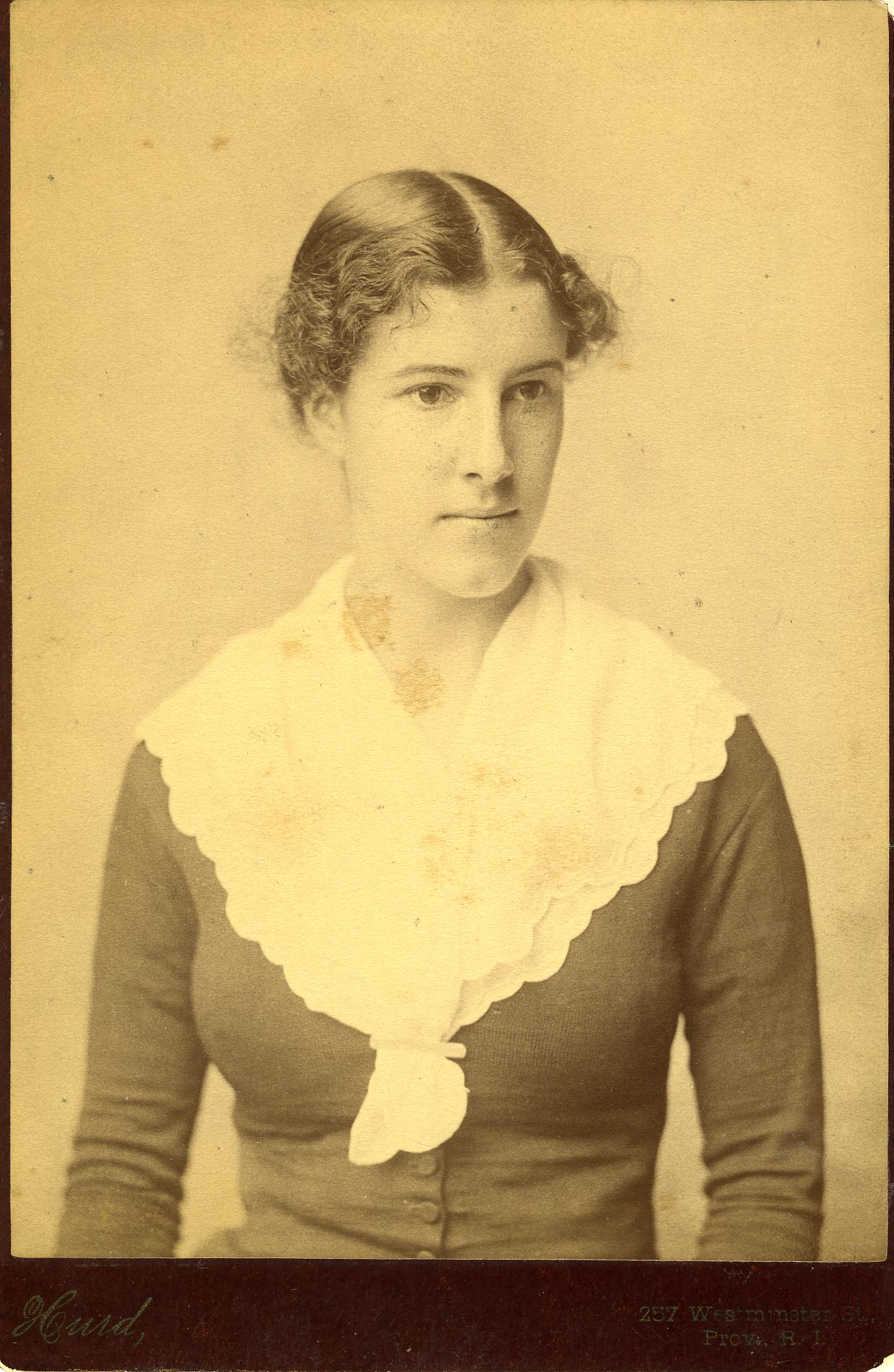
Portrait of Gilman at age 24, c. 1884

== Career ==
After moving to Pasadena, Gilman became active in organizing social reform movements. As a delegate, she represented California in 1896 at both the National American Woman Suffrage Association convention in Washington, D.C., and the International Socialist and Labor Congress in London. In 1890, she was introduced to the Nationalist Clubs movement which worked to "end capitalism's greed and distinctions between classes while promoting a peaceful, ethical, and truly progressive human race." Published in the Nationalist magazine, her poem "Similar Cases" was a satirical review of people who resisted social change, and she received positive feedback from critics for it. Throughout that same year, 1890, she became inspired enough to write fifteen essays, poems, a novella, and the short story "The Yellow Wallpaper".

Her career was launched when she began lecturing on Nationalism and gained the public's eye with her first volume of poetry, In This Our World, published in 1893. As a successful lecturer who relied on giving speeches as a source of income, her fame grew along with her social circle of similar-minded activists and writers of the feminist movement.

Over the course of her career, in addition to publishing poems and fiction, Gilman published six significant books of non-fiction; a contribution which led her to be seen as one of the “women founders” of the discipline of sociology. These works, and additional published journal articles, exposed both gender and class inequality, criticizing it as illegitimate and unfair. She was a member of the American Sociological Association from the time of its founding in 1905 to her death in 1935.

=== "The Yellow Wallpaper" ===
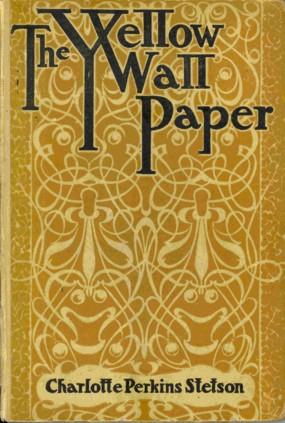
The Yellow Wallpaper, one of Gilman's most popular works, originally published in 1892, before her marriage to George Houghton Gilman.

In 1890, Gilman wrote her short story "The Yellow Wallpaper", which is now the all-time best selling book of the Feminist Press. She wrote it on June 6 and 7, 1890, in her home of Pasadena, and it was printed a year and a half later in the January 1892 issue of The New England Magazine. Since its original printing, it has been anthologized in numerous collections of women's literature, American literature, and textbooks, though not always in its original form. For instance, many textbooks omit the phrase "in marriage" from a very important line in the beginning of story: "John laughs at me, of course, but one expects that in marriage." The reason for this omission is a mystery, as Gilman's views on marriage are made clear throughout the story.

The story is about a woman who suffers from mental illness after three months of being closeted in a room by her husband for the sake of her health. She becomes obsessed with the room's revolting yellow wallpaper. Gilman wrote this story to change people's minds about the role of women in society, illustrating how women's lack of autonomy is detrimental to their mental, emotional, and even physical wellbeing. This story was inspired by her treatment from her first husband. The narrator in the story must do as her husband (who is also her doctor) demands, although the treatment he prescribes contrasts directly with what she truly needs—mental stimulation and the freedom to escape the monotony of the room to which she is confined. "The Yellow Wallpaper" was essentially a response to the doctor (Dr. Silas Weir Mitchell) who had tried to cure her of her depression through a "rest cure" and who is mentioned in the story: "John says if I don’t pick up faster he shall send me to Weir Mitchell in the fall." She sent him a copy of the story.

"The Yellow Wallpaper" has very similar aspects to Charlotte Perkins Gilman's own life, specifically her struggles with mental health and her experience with the “rest cure”-therapy. After the birth of her daughter in 1885, Gilman suffered from severe depression. On the advice of her doctor, she got a treatment for that she had to live a quiet, domestic life, avoid intellectual work, and keep her distance from any form of creative expression, including writing or painting.

This treatment, intended to improve her health, instead it worsened her mental state, which made her write the story about the experience from the perspective of her own fictional character “The Yellow Wallpaper”. In the short story, the narrator, Jane, goes through a similar treatment, to stay in a room and unallowed to write. The isolation and lack of tasks lead her to a mental decline and following breakdown, symbolized by her obsession with the yellow wallpaper.

=== The Home: Its Work and Influence ===
In 1903 Gilman published a non-fiction book The Home: Its Work and Influence. In this influential work, Gilman explores the role of the home in society and its impact on individuals, particularly women. She challenges traditional gender roles and argues for greater autonomy and fulfillment for women beyond domestic responsibilities. Gilman critiques the notion of the home as solely a woman's domain and advocates for social and economic reforms to empower women and improve their well-being. "The Home: Its Work and Influence" is a seminal text in the early feminist movement and continues to be studied for its insights into gender, society, and the domestic sphere.

=== The Crux ===
The Crux is an important early feminist work of fiction that brings to the fore complicated issues of gender, citizenship, eugenics, and frontier nationalism. First published serially in the feminist journal The Forerunner in 1910, The Crux tells the story of a group of New England women who move west to start a boardinghouse for men in Colorado. The innocent central character, Vivian Lane, falls in love with Morton Elder, who has both gonorrhea and syphilis. The concern of the novel is not so much that Vivian will catch syphilis, but that, if she were to marry and have children with Morton, she would harm the "national stock." The novel was written, in Gilman's words, as a "story ... for young women to read ... in order that they may protect themselves and their children to come." What was to be protected was the civic imperative to produce "pureblooded" citizens for a utopian ideal.

=== Suffrage Songs and Verses ===
Suffrage Songs and Verses is a collection of poems and songs written by Gilman, published during the suffrage movement in the early 20th century. In this collection, Gilman uses her poetic voice to advocate for women's rights, particularly the right to vote. Through verse, she expresses the frustrations of women who were denied political participation and calls for gender equality. The poems celebrate the strength, resilience, and determination of suffragists while critiquing the patriarchal society that oppresses women. "Suffrage Songs and Verses" serves as both a literary work and a rallying cry for the suffrage movement, capturing the spirit and passion of the activists who fought for women's enfranchisement.

== Other notable works ==
=== Art Gems for the Home and Fireside and This Our World ===
In 1888 Gilman published her first book, Art Gems for the Home and Fireside (1888); however, it was her first volume of poetry, In This Our World (1893), a collection of satirical poems, that first brought her recognition. During the next two decades she gained much of her fame with lectures on women's issues, ethics, labor, human rights, and social reform. She often referred to these themes in her fiction. Her lecture tours took her across the United States.

=== Women and Economics ===
In 1894–95 Gilman served as editor of the magazine The Impress, a literary weekly that was published by the Pacific Coast Women's Press Association (formerly the Bulletin). For the twenty weeks the magazine was printed, she was consumed in the satisfying accomplishment of contributing its poems, editorials, and other articles. The short-lived paper's printing came to an end as a result of a social bias against her lifestyle which included being an unconventional mother and a woman who had divorced a man. After a four-month-long lecture tour that ended in April 1897, Gilman began to think more deeply about sexual relationships and economics in American life, eventually completing the first draft of Women and Economics (1898). This book discussed the role of women in the home, arguing for changes in the practices of child-raising and housekeeping to alleviate pressures from women and potentially allow them to expand their work to the public sphere. She argued that separate spheres are unfair due to 3 reasons. First, women are not truly men's economic partners. Second, women's economic profit comes from “sex attraction” for example marrying up. Third, the contradictions of motherhood, to attract a man a woman must behave timid and weak, yet be a good mother, she must be strong and determined. Her solution to this is baby gardens, community kitchens, hiring domestic help, and training children better. The book was published in the following year and propelled Gilman into the international spotlight. In 1903, she addressed the International Congress of Women in Berlin. The next year, she toured in England, the Netherlands, Germany, Austria, and Hungary.

=== The Home: Its Work and Influence ===
In 1903 she wrote one of her most critically acclaimed books, The Home: Its Work and Influence, which expanded upon Women and Economics, proposing that women are oppressed in their home and that the environment in which they live needs to be modified in order to be healthy for their mental states. In between traveling and writing, her career as a literary figure was secured.

=== "The Forerunner," ===
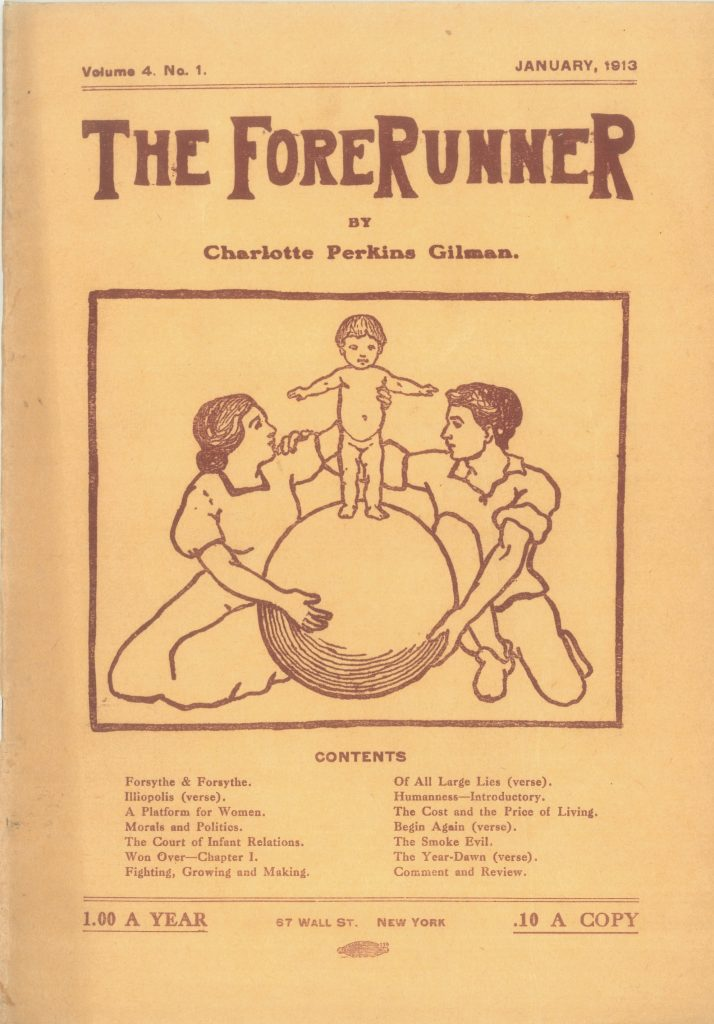
1913 issue of The Forerunner

From 1909 to 1916 Gilman single-handedly wrote and edited her own magazine, The Forerunner, in which much of her fiction appeared. By presenting material in her magazine that would "stimulate thought", "arouse hope, courage and impatience", and "express ideas which need a special medium", she aimed to go against the mainstream media which was overly sensational. Over seven years and two months the magazine produced eighty-six issues, each twenty eight pages long. The magazine had nearly 1,500 subscribers and featured such serialized works as "What Diantha Did" (1910), The Crux (1911), Moving the Mountain (1911), and Herland (1915). The Forerunner has been cited as being "perhaps the greatest literary accomplishment of her long career". After its seven years, she wrote hundreds of articles that were submitted to the Louisville Herald, The Baltimore Sun, and the Buffalo Evening News. Her autobiography, The Living of Charlotte Perkins Gilman, which she began to write in 1925, was published posthumously in 1935.

=== Non-fiction ===
- Women and Economics: A Study of the Economic Relation Between Men and Women as a Factor in Social Evolution (1898)
- Concerning Children (1900)
- The Home: Its Work and Influence (1903)
- Human Work (1904)
- The Man-Made World; or, Our Androcentric Culture (1911)
- Our Brains and What Ails Them (1912)
- Humanness (1913)
- Social Ethics (1914)
- The Dress of Women (1915)
- Growth and Combat (1916)
- His Religion and Hers: A Study of the Faith of Our Fathers and the Work of Our Mothers (1923)
- The Living of Charlotte Perkins Gilman: An Autobiography (1935)
- The Essential Lectures of Charlotte Perkins Gilman, 1890-1894 (2024)

=== Fiction ===
- "The Yellow Wallpaper" 5 [January], (1892).
- The Yellow Wallpaper (1899)
- What Diantha Did (1910)
- Moving the Mountain (1911)
- The Crux (1911)
- Benigna Machiavelli (1916)
- Herland (1915)
- With Her in Ourland (1916)

=== Poetry ===
- In This Our World: Poems, Oakland, California: McCombs & Vaughn (1893)
- Suffrage Songs and Verses, New York: The Charlton Company (1911)

== Social theories ==
=== Reform Darwinism and the role of women in society ===
Gilman called herself a humanist and was an early contributor to the discipline of sociology and to feminist theory. She believed the domestic environment oppressed women through the patriarchal beliefs upheld by society. Gilman embraced the theory of reform Darwinism and argued that Darwin's theories of evolution presented only the male as the given in the process of human evolution, thus overlooking the origins of the female brain in society that rationally chose the best suited mate that they could find.

Gilman argued that male aggressiveness and maternal roles for women were artificial and no longer necessary for survival in post-prehistoric times. She wrote, "There is no female mind. The brain is not an organ of sex. Might as well speak of a female liver."

Her main argument was that sex and domestic economics went hand in hand; for a woman to survive, she was reliant on her sexual assets to please her husband so that he would financially support his family. From childhood, young girls are forced into a social constraint that prepares them for motherhood by the toys that are marketed to them and the clothes designed for them. She argued that there should be no difference in the clothes that little girls and boys wear, the toys they play with, or the activities they do, and described tomboys as perfect humans who ran around and used their bodies freely and healthily.

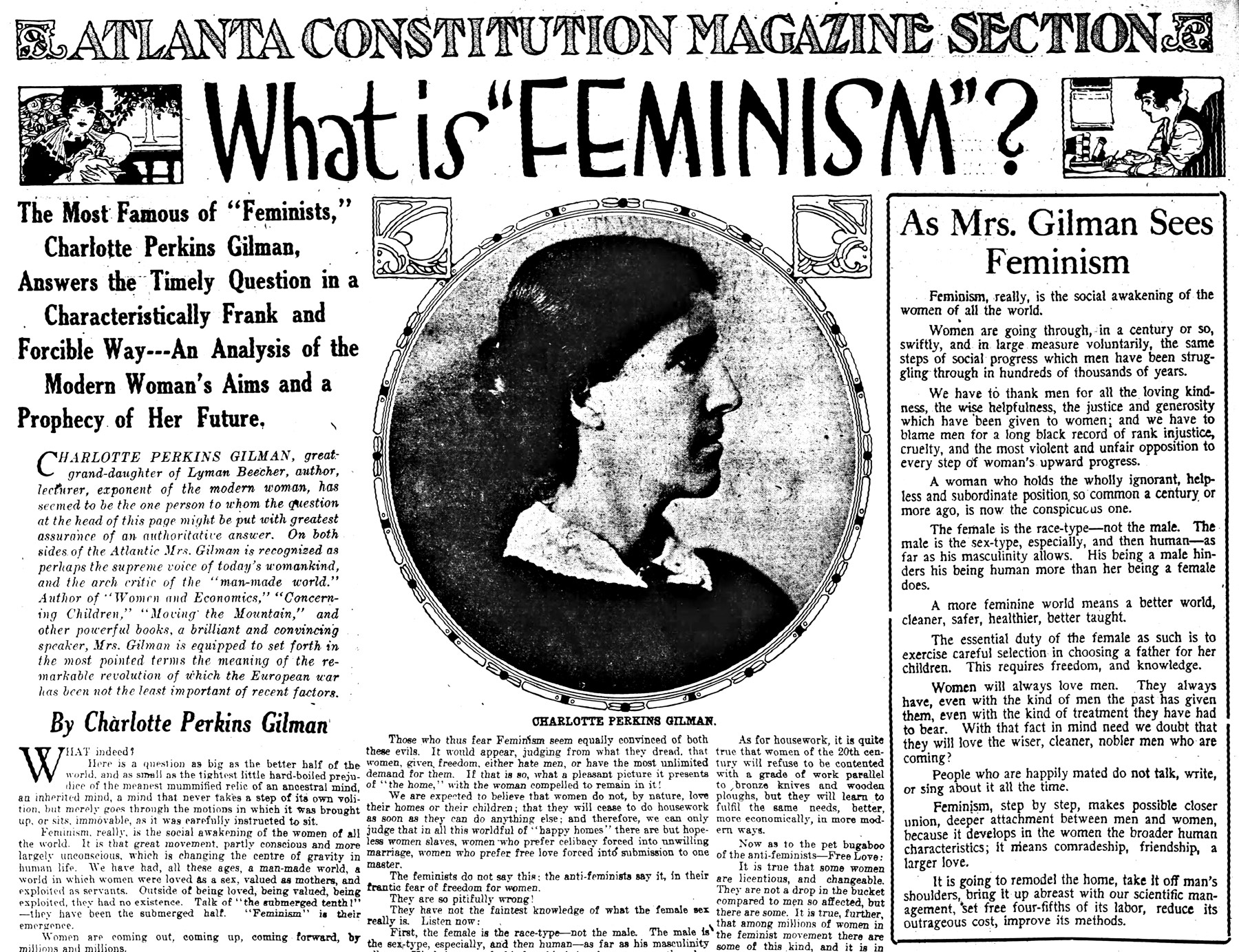
Articles about feminism by Gilman and a photo of her as printed in the Atlanta Constitution, December 10, 1916

Gilman argued that women's contributions to civilization, throughout history, have been halted because of an androcentric culture. She believed that womankind was the underdeveloped half of humanity, and that improvement was necessary to prevent the deterioration of the human race. She further believed that economic independence was the only thing that could really bring freedom for women and make them equal to men.

In 1898, Gilman published Women and Economics, a theoretical treatise which argued, among other things, that women are subjugated by men, that motherhood should not preclude a woman from working outside the home, and that housekeeping, cooking, and child care, would be professionalized. "The ideal woman," Gilman wrote, "was not only assigned a social role that locked her into her home, but she was also expected to like it, to be cheerful and gay, smiling and good-humored." When the sexual-economic relationship ceases to exist, life on the domestic front would certainly improve, as frustration in relationships often stems from the lack of social contact that the domestic wife has with the outside world.

Gilman became a spokesperson on topics such as women's perspectives on work, dress reform, and family. Housework, she argued, should be equally shared by men and women, and that at an early age women should be encouraged to be independent. In many of her major works, including "The Home" (1903), Human Work (1904), and The Man-Made World (1911), Gilman also advocated women working outside of the home.

Gilman argued that the home should be socially redefined. The home should shift from being an "economic entity" where a married couple live together because of the economic benefit or necessity, to a place where groups of men and groups of women can share in a "peaceful and permanent expression of personal life."

Gilman believed having a comfortable and healthy lifestyle should not be restricted to married couples; all humans need a home that provides these amenities. She suggested that a communal type of housing open to both males and females, consisting of rooms, rooms of suites and houses, should be constructed. This would allow individuals to live singly and still have companionship and the comforts of a home. Both males and females would be totally economically independent in these living arrangements allowing for marriage to occur without either the male or the female's economic status having to change.

The structural arrangement of the home is also redefined by Gilman. She removes the kitchen from the home, leaving rooms to be arranged and extended in any form and freeing women from the provision of meals in the home. The home would become a true personal expression of the individual living in it.

Ultimately the restructuring of the home and manner of living will allow individuals, especially women, to become an "integral part of the social structure, in close, direct, permanent connection with the needs and uses of society." That would be a dramatic change for women, who generally considered themselves restricted by family life built upon their economic dependence on men.

=== Feminism in stories and novellas ===
Gilman created a world in many of her stories with a feminist point of view. Two of her narratives, "What Diantha Did", and Herland, are good examples of Gilman focusing her work on how women are not just stay-at-home mothers they are expected to be; they are also people who have dreams, who are able to travel and work just as men do, and whose goals include a society where women are just as important as men. The world-building that is executed by Gilman, as well as the characters in these two stories and others, embody the change that was needed in the early 1900s in a way that is now commonly seen as feminism.

Gilman uses world-building in Herland to demonstrate the equality that she longed to see. The women of Herland are the providers as there are no men in their society. This makes them appear to be the dominant sex, taking over the gender roles that are typically given to men. Elizabeth Keyser notes, "In Herland the supposedly superior sex becomes the inferior or disadvantaged ..." In this utopian world, the women reproduce asexually and consider it an honor to be mothers. Unlike the patriarchal society that exists outside of Herland, the women do not have surnames for themselves or their children, as they do not believe that human beings should be "claimed" by others. In this society, Gilman makes it to where women are focused on having leadership within the community, fulfilling roles that are stereotypically seen as being male roles, and running an entire community without the same attitudes that men have concerning their work and the community. However, the attitude men carried concerning women were degrading, especially by progressive women, like Gilman. Using Herland, Gilman challenged this stereotype, and made the society of Herland a type of paradise. Gilman uses this story to confirm the stereotypically devalued qualities of women are valuable, show strength, and shatters traditional utopian structure for future works. Essentially, Gilman creates Herland's society to have women hold all the power, showing more equality in this world, alluding to changes she wanted to see in her lifetime.

Gilman's feminism is seen more clearly in her work "What Diantha Did" than in Herland. Diantha breaks through the traditional expectation of women, which shows Gilman's desires for what women would be allowed to do in her own real-life society. Throughout the story, Gilman portrays Diantha as a character who strikes through the image of businesses in the U.S., who challenges gender norms and roles, and who believed that women could provide the solution to the corruption in big business in society. Gilman chooses to have Diantha choose a career that is stereotypically not one a woman would have because in doing so, she is showing that the salaries and wages of traditional women's jobs are unfair. Diantha's choice to run a business allows her to come out of the shadows and join society.

Gilman's works, especially her work "What Diantha Did", were a call for change, a battle cry that caused panic in men and power in women. Gilman used her work as a platform for a call to change, as a way to reach women and have them begin the movement toward freedom.

=== Racial views ===
In 1908, Gilman published an article in the American Journal of Sociology, titled "A Suggestion on the Negro Problem", in which she set out her views on what she considered a "sociological problem" involving the condition of the large African American minority in America. She immediately stated that they "were forcibly extradited from a distant country" and given a "compulsory introduction into our economic group". She then noted that "in a certain number of cases the negro has developed an ability" to succeed in the business world, and "admitt[ed], most cheerfully, that this proves the ultimate capacity of the race to do so".

While referring to them as "a large body of aliens" that was "widely dissimilar and in many respects inferior," Gilman averred that the economic and social situation of African Americans was "to us a social injury". She contended that the history of slavery in the United States meant that it was therefore the responsibility of white Americans to alleviate the situation, and pointedly observed that, if her own race could not "so behave itself as thus to elevate and improve" the Black race, then white Americans, "with all our boasted advancement", would themselves "need some scheme of race betterment".

Gilman was unequivocal about the ills of slavery and the wrongs which many White Americans had done to Black Americans, stating that irrespective of any crimes committed by Black Americans, "[Whites] were the original offender, and have a list of injuries to [Black Americans], greatly outnumbering the counter list." She proposed that those Black Americans who were not "self-supporting" or who were "actual criminals" (which she clearly distinguished from "the decent, self-supporting, progressive negroes") could be "enlisted" into a quasi-military state labour force, which she viewed as akin to conscription in certain countries. Such force would be deployed in "modern agriculture" and infrastructure, and those who had eventually acquired adequate skills and training "would be graduated with honor" – Gilman believed that any such conscription should be "compulsory at the bottom, perfectly free at the top."

Gilman's racialist views led her to espouse eugenicist beliefs, claiming that Old Stock Americans were surrendering their country to immigrants who were diluting the nation's racial purity. When asked about her stance on the matter during a trip to London she declared "I am an Anglo-Saxon before everything." In an effort to gain the vote for all women, she spoke out against literacy voting tests at the 1903 National American Woman Suffrage Association convention in New Orleans.

Literary critic Susan S. Lanser says "The Yellow Wallpaper" should be interpreted by focusing on Gilman's racism. Other literary critics have built on Lanser's work to understand Gilman's ideas in relation to turn-of-the-century culture more broadly.

=== Animals ===
Gilman's feminist works often included stances and arguments for reforming the use of domesticated animals. In Herland, Gilman's utopian society excludes all domesticated animals, including livestock. In Moving the Mountain Gilman addresses the ills of animal domestication related to inbreeding. In "When I Was a Witch", the narrator witnesses and intervenes in instances of animal use as she travels through New York, liberating work horses, cats, and lapdogs by rendering them "comfortably dead". One literary scholar connected the regression of the female narrator in "The Yellow Wallpaper" to the parallel status of domesticated felines. She wrote in a letter to the Saturday Evening Post that the automobile would eliminate the cruelty to horses used to pull carriages and cars.

== Critical reception ==
"The Yellow Wallpaper" was initially met with a mixed reception. One anonymous letter submitted to the Boston Transcript read, "The story could hardly, it would seem, give pleasure to any reader, and to many whose lives have been touched through the dearest ties by this dread disease, it must bring the keenest pain. To others, whose lives have become a struggle against heredity of mental derangement, such literature contains deadly peril. Should such stories be allowed to pass without severest censure?"

Positive reviewers describe it as impressive because it is the most suggestive and graphic account of why women who live monotonous lives are susceptible to mental illness.

Although Gilman had gained international fame with the publication of Women and Economics in 1898, by the end of World War I, she seemed out of tune with her times. In her autobiography she admitted that "unfortunately my views on the sex question do not appeal to the Freudian complex of today, nor are people satisfied with a presentation of religion as a help in our tremendous work of improving this world."

Ann J. Lane writes in Herland and Beyond that "Gilman offered perspectives on major issues of gender with which we still grapple; the origins of women's subjugation, the struggle to achieve both autonomy and intimacy in human relationships; the central role of work as a definition of self; new strategies for rearing and educating future generations to create a humane and nurturing environment."

== Bibliography ==
Gilman's works include:

=== Poetry collections ===
- Virginia's Sisters: An Anthology of Women's Writings, 2023. London: Aurora Metro Books, ISBN 9781912430789
- In This Our World, 1st ed. Oakland: McCombs & Vaughn, 1893. London: T. Fisher Unwin, 1895. 2nd ed.; San Francisco: Press of James H. Barry, 1895.
- Suffrage Songs and Verses. New York: Charlton Co., 1911. Microfilm. New Haven: Research Publications, 1977, History of Women #6558.
- The Later Poetry of Charlotte Perkins Gilman. Newark, DE: University of Delaware Press, 1996.

=== Short stories ===
Gilman published 186 short stories in magazines, newspapers, and many were published in her self-published monthly, The Forerunner. Many literary critics have ignored these short stories.

- "Circumstances Alter Cases". Kate Field's Washington, July 23, 1890: 55–56. "The Yellow Wall-Paper" and Other Stories. Ed. Robert Shulman. Oxford: Oxford University Press, 1995. 32–38.
- "That Rare Jewel". Women's Journal, May 17, 1890: 158. "The Yellow Wall-Paper" and Other Stories. Ed. Robert Shulman. Oxford: Oxford UP, 1995. 20–24.
- "The Unexpected". Kate Field's Washington, May 21, 1890: 335–6. "The Yellow Wall-Paper" and Other Stories. Ed. Robert Shulman. Oxford: Oxford UP, 1995. 25–31.
- "An Extinct Angel". Kate Field's Washington, September 23, 1891:199–200. "The Yellow Wall-Paper" and Other Stories. Ed. Robert Shulman. Oxford: Oxford UP, 1995. 48–50.
- "The Giant Wistaria". New England Magazine 4 (1891): 480–85. "The Yellow Wall-Paper" and Other Stories. Ed. Robert Shulman. Oxford: Oxford UP, 1995. 39–47.
- "The Yellow Wall-paper". New England Magazine 5 (1892): 647–56; Boston: Small, Maynard & Co., 1899; NY: Feminist Press, 1973 Afterword Elaine Hedges; Oxford: Oxford UP, 1995. Introduction Robert Shulman.
- "The Rocking-Chair". Worthington's Illustrated 1 (1893): 453–59. "The Yellow Wall-Paper" and Other Stories. Ed. Robert Shulman. Oxford: Oxford UP, 1995. 51–61.
- "An Elopement". San Francisco Call, July 10, 1893: 1. "The Yellow Wall-Paper" and Other Stories. Ed. Robert Shulman. Oxford: Oxford UP, 1995. 66–68.
- "Deserted". San Francisco Call July 17, 1893: 1–2. "The Yellow Wall-Paper" and Other Stories. Ed. Robert Shulman. Oxford: Oxford UP, 1995. 62–65.
- "Through This". Kate Field's Washington, September 13, 1893: 166. "The Yellow Wall-Paper" and Other Stories. Ed. Robert Shulman. Oxford: Oxford UP, 1995. 69–72.
- "A Day's Berryin'". Impress, October 13, 1894: 4–5. "The Yellow Wall-Paper" and Other Stories. Ed. Robert Shulman. Oxford: Oxford UP, 1995. 78–82.
- "Five Girls". Impress, December 1, 1894: 5. "The Yellow Wall-Paper" and Other Stories. Ed. Robert Shulman. Oxford: Oxford UP, 1995. 83–86.
- "One Way Out". Impress, December 29, 1894: 4–5. "The Yellow Wall-Paper" and Other Stories. Ed. Robert Shulman. Oxford: Oxford UP, 1995. 87–91.
- "The Misleading of Pendleton Oaks". Impress, October 6, 1894: 4–5. "The Yellow Wall-Paper" and Other Stories. Ed. Robert Shulman. Oxford: Oxford UP, 1995. 73–77.
- "An Unnatural Mother". Impress, February 16, 1895: 4–5. "The Yellow Wall-Paper" and Other Stories. Ed. Robert Shulman. Oxford: Oxford UP, 1995. 98–106.
- "An Unpatented Process". Impress, January 12, 1895: 4–5. "The Yellow Wall-Paper" and Other Stories. Ed. Robert Shulman. Oxford: Oxford UP, 1995. 92–97.
- "According to Solomon". Forerunner 1:2 (1909):1–5. "The Yellow Wall-Paper" and Other Stories. Ed. Robert Shulman. Oxford: Oxford UP, 1995. 122–129.
- "Three Thanksgivings". Forerunner 1 (1909): 5–12. "The Yellow Wall-Paper" and Other Stories. Ed. Robert Shulman. Oxford: Oxford UP, 1995. 107–121.
- "What Diantha Did. A NOVEL". Forerunner 1 (1909–11); NY: Charlton Co., 1910; London: T. Fisher Unwin, 1912.
- "The Cottagette". Forerunner 1:10 (1910): 1–5. "The Yellow Wall-Paper" and Other Stories. Ed. Robert Shulman. Oxford: Oxford UP, 1995. 130–138.
- "When I Was a Witch". Forerunner 1 (1910): 1–6. The Charlotte Perkins Gilman Reader. Ed. Ann J. Lane. NY: Pantheon, 1980. 21–31.
- "In Two Houses". Forerunner 2:7 (1911): 171–77. "The Yellow Wall-Paper" and Other Stories. Ed. Robert Shulman. Oxford: Oxford UP, 1995. 159–171.
- "Making a Change". Forerunner 2:12 (1911): 311–315. "The Yellow Wall-Paper" and Other Stories. Ed. Robert Shulman. Oxford: Oxford UP, 1995. 182–190.
- "Moving the Mountain". Forerunner 2 (1911); NY: Charlton Co., 1911; The Charlotte Perkins Gilman Reader. Ed. Ann J. Lane. NY: Pantheon, 1980. 178–188.
- "The Crux.A NOVEL". Forerunner 2 (1910); NY: Charlton Co., 1911; The Charlotte Perkins Gilman Reader. Ed. Ann J. Lane. NY: Pantheon, 1980. 116–122.
- "The Jumping-off Place". Forerunner 2:4 (1911): 87–93. "The Yellow Wall-Paper" and Other Stories. Ed. Robert Shulman. Oxford: Oxford UP, 1995. 148–158.
- "The Widow's Might". Forerunner 2:1 (1911): 3–7. "The Yellow Wall-Paper" and Other Stories. Ed. Robert Shulman. Oxford: Oxford UP, 1995. 139–147.
- "Turned". Forerunner 2:9 (1911): 227–32. "The Yellow Wall-Paper" and Other Stories. Ed. Robert Shulman. Oxford: Oxford UP, 1995. 182–191.
- "Mrs. Elder's Idea". Forerunner 3:2 (1912): 29–32. "The Yellow Wall-Paper" and Other Stories. Ed. Robert Shulman. Oxford: Oxford UP, 1995. 191–199.
- "Their House". Forerunner 3:12 (1912): 309–14. "The Yellow Wall-Paper" and Other Stories''. Ed. Robert Shulman. Oxford: Oxford UP, 1995. 200–209.
- "A Council of War". Forerunner 4:8 (1913): 197–201. "The Yellow Wall-Paper" and Other Stories. Ed. Robert Shulman. Oxford: Oxford UP, 1995. 235–243.
- "Bee Wise". Forerunner 4:7 (1913): 169–173. "The Yellow Wall-Paper" and Other Stories. Ed. Robert Shulman. Oxford: Oxford UP, 1995. 226–234.
- "Her Beauty". Forerunner 4:2 (1913): 29–33. "The Yellow Wall-Paper" and Other Stories. Ed. Robert Shulman. Oxford: Oxford UP, 1995. 210–217.
- "Mrs. Hines's Money". Forerunner 4:4 (1913): 85–89. "The Yellow Wall-Paper" and Other Stories. Ed. Robert Shulman. Oxford: Oxford UP, 1995. 218–226.
- "A Partnership". Forerunner 5:6 (1914): 141–45. "The Yellow Wall-Paper" and Other Stories. Ed. Robert Shulman. Oxford: Oxford UP, 1995. 253–261.
- "Begnina Machiavelli. A NOVEL". Forerunner 5 (1914); NY: Such and Such Publishing, 1998.
- "Fulfilment". Forerunner 5:3 (1914): 57–61. "The Yellow Wall-Paper" and Other Stories. Ed. Robert Shulman. Oxford: Oxford UP, 1995.
- "If I Were a Man". Physical Culture 32 (1914): 31–34. "The Yellow Wall-Paper" and Other Stories. Ed. Robert Shulman. Oxford: Oxford UP, 1995. 262–268.
- "Mr. Peebles's Heart". Forerunner 5:9 (1914): 225–29. "The Yellow Wall-Paper" and Other Stories. Ed. Robert Shulman. Oxford: Oxford UP, 1995. 269–276.
- "Dr. Clair's Place". Forerunner 6:6 (1915): 141–45. "The Yellow Wall-Paper" and Other Stories. Ed. Robert Shulman. Oxford: Oxford UP, 1995. 295–303.
- "Girls and Land". Forerunner 6:5 (1915): 113–117. "The Yellow Wall-Paper" and Other Stories. Ed. Robert Shulman. Oxford: Oxford UP, 1995. 286–294.
- "Herland. A NOVEL. " Forerunner 6 (1915); NY: Pantheon Books, 1979.
- "Mrs. Merrill's Duties". Forerunner 6:3 (1915): 57–61. "The Yellow Wall-Paper" and Other Stories. Ed. Robert Shulman. Oxford: Oxford UP, 1995. 277–285.
- "A Surplus Woman". Forerunner 7:5 (1916): 113–18. "The Yellow Wall-Paper" and Other Stories. Ed. Robert Shulman. Oxford: Oxford UP, 1995. 304–313.
- "Joan's Defender". Forerunner 7:6 (1916): 141–45. '"The Yellow Wall-Paper" and Other Stories. Ed. Robert Shulman. Oxford: Oxford UP, 1995. 314–322.
- "The Girl in the Pink Hat". Forerunner 7 (1916): 39–46. The Charlotte Perkins Gilman Reader. Ed. Ann J. Lane. NY: Pantheon, 1980. 39–45.
- "With Her in Ourland: Sequel to Herland. A NOVEL". Forerunner 7 (1916); Westport: Greenwood Publishing Group, 1997.

=== Novels and novellas ===
- What Diantha Did. Forerunner. 1909–10.
- The Crux. Forerunner. 1911.
- Moving the Mountain. Forerunner. 1911.
- Mag-Marjorie. Forerunner. 1912.
- Won Over Forerunner. 1913.
- Benigna Machiavelli Forerunner. 1914.
- Herland. Forerunner. 1915.
- With Her in Ourland. Forerunner. 1916.
- Unpunished. Ed. Catherine J. Golden and Denise D. Knight. New York: Feminist Press, 1997.

=== Drama/dialogues ===
The majority of Gilman's dramas are inaccessible as they are only available from the originals. Some were printed/reprinted in Forerunner, however.

- "Dame Nature Interviewed on the Woman Question as It Looks to Her" Kate Field's Washington (1890): 138–40.
- "The Twilight". Impress (November 10, 1894): 4–5.
- "Story Studies", Impress, November 17, 1894: 5.
- "The Story Guessers", Impress, November 24, 1894: 5.
- "Three Women". Forerunner 2 (1911): 134.
- "Something to Vote For", Forerunner 2 (1911) 143–53.
- "The Ceaseless Struggle of Sex: A Dramatic View". Kate Field's Washington. April 9, 1890, 239–40.

=== Non-fiction ===
- Women and Economics: A Study of the Economic Relation Between Men and Women as a Factor in Social Evolution. Boston: Small, Maynard & Co., 1898.
- The Essential Lectures of Charlotte Perkins Gilman, 1890-1894. (2024)

==== Book-length ====
- His Religion and Hers: A Study of the Faith of Our Fathers and the Work of Our Mothers. New York and London: Century Co., 1923; London: T. Fisher Unwin, 1924; Westport, Conn.: Hyperion Press, 1976.
- Gems of Art for the Home and Fireside. Providence, RI: J. A. and R. A. Reid, 1888.
- Women and economics. A study of the economic relation between men and women as a factor in social evolution. Boston, Small, Maynard & Co., 1899
- Concerning Children. Boston: Small, Maynard & Co., 1900.
- The Home. Its Work and Influence. New York: McClure, Phillips, & Co., 1903.
- Human Work. New York: McClure, Phillips, & Co., 1904.
- The Man-Made World or, Our Androcentric Culture. New York: Charton Co., 1911.
- Our Brains and What Ails Them. Serialized in Forerunner. 1912.
- Social Ethics. Serialized in Forerunner. 1914.
- Our Changing Morality. Ed. Freda Kirchway. NY: Boni, 1930. 53–66.

==== Short and serial non-fiction ====
- "On Advertising for Marriage". The Alpha 11, September 1, 1885: 7
- "Why Women Do Not Reform Their Dress". Woman's Journal, October 9, 1886: 338.
- "A Protest Against Petticoats". Woman's Journal, January 8, 1887: 60.
- "The Providence Ladies Gymnasium". Providence Journal 8 (1888): 2.
- "How Much Must We Read?" Pacific Monthly 1 (1889): 43–44.
- "Altering Human Nature". California Nationalist, May 10, 1890: 10.
- "Are Women Better Than Men?" Pacific Monthly 3 (1891): 9–11.
- "A Lady on the Cap and Apron Question". Wasp, June 6, 1891: 3.
- "The Reactive Lies of Gallantry". Belford's ns 2 (1892): 205–8.
- "The Vegetable Chinaman". Housekeeper's Weekly, June 24, 1893: 3.
- "The Saloon and Its Annex". Stockton Mail 4 (1893): 4.
- "The Business League for Women". Impress 1 (1894): 2.
- "Official Report of Woman's Congress". Impress 1 (1894): 3.
- "John Smith and Armenia". Impress, January 12, 1895: 2–3.
- "The American Government". Woman's Column, June 6, 1896: 3.
- "When Socialism Began". American Fabian 3 (1897): 1–2.
- "Causes and Uses of the Subjection of Women". Woman's Journal, December 24, 1898: 410.
- "The Automobile as a Reformer". Saturday Evening Post, June 3, 1899: 778.
- "Superfluous Women". Women's Journal, April 7, 1900: 105.
- "Esthetic Dyspepsia". Saturday Evening Post, August 4, 1900: 12.
- "Ideals of Child Culture". Child Stude For Mothers and Teachers. Ed Margaret Sangster. Philadelphia: Booklovers Library, 1901. 93–101.
- "Should Wives Work?" Success 5 (1902): 139.
- "Fortschritte der Frauen in Amerika". Neues Frauenleben 1:1 (1903): 2–5.
- "The Passing of the Home in Great American Cities". Cosmopolitan 38 (1904): 137–47.
- "The Beauty of a Block". Independent, July 14, 1904: 67–72.
- "The Home and the Hospital". Good Housekeeping 40 (1905): 9.
- "Some Light on the [Single Woman's] 'Problem.'" American Magazine 62 (1906): 4270428.
- "Why Cooperative Housekeeping Fails". Harper's Bazaar 41 (July 1907): 625–629.
- "Social Darwinism". American Journal of Sociology 12 (1907): 713–14.
- "A Suggestion on the Negro Problem". American Journal of Sociology 14 (1908): 78–85.
- "How Home Conditions React Upon the Family". American Journal of Sociology 14 (1909): 592–605.
- "Children's Clothing". Harper's Bazaar 44 (1910): 24.
- "On Dogs". Forerunner 2 (1911): 206–9.
- "Should Women Use Violence?" Pictorial Review 14 (1912): 11, 78–79.
- "How to Lighten the Labor of Women". McCall's 40 (1912): 14–15, 77.
- "What 'Love' Really Is". Pictorial Review 14 (1913): 11, 57.
- "Gum Chewing in Public". New York Times, May 20, 1914:12:5.
- "A Rational Position on Suffrage/At the Request of the New York Times, Mrs. Gilman Presents the Best Arguments Possible in Behalf of Votes for Women". New York Times Magazine, March 7, 1915: 14–15.
- "What is Feminism?" Boston Sunday Herald Magazine, September 3, 1916: 7.
- "The Housekeeper and the Food Problem". Annals of the American Academy 74 (1917): 123–40.
- "Concerning Clothes". Independent, June 22, 1918: 478, 483.
- "The Socializing of Education". Public, April 5, 1919: 348–49.
- "A Woman's Party". Suffragist 8 (1920): 8–9.
- "Making Towns Fit to Live In". Century 102 (1921): 361–366.
- "Cross-Examining Santa Claus". Century 105 (1922): 169–174.
- "Is America Too Hospitable?" Forum 70 (1923): 1983–89.
- "Toward Monogamy". Nation, June 11, 1924: 671–73.
- "The Nobler Male". Forum 74 (1925): 19–21.
- "American Radicals". New York Jewish Daily Forward 1 (1926): 1.
- "Progress through Birth Control". North American Review 224 (1927): 622–29.
- "Divorce and Birth Control". Outlook, January 25, 1928: 130–31.
- "Feminism and Social Progress". Problems of Civilization. Ed. Baker Brownell. NY: D. Van Nostrand, 1929. 115–42.
- "Sex and Race Progress". Sex in Civilization. Eds V. F. Calverton and S. D. Schmalhausen. NY: Macaulay, 1929. 109–23.
- "Parasitism and Civilized Vice". Woman's Coming of Age. Ed. S. D. Schmalhausen. NY: Liveright, 1931. 110–26.
- "Birth Control, Religion and the Unfit". Nation, January 27, 1932: 108–109.
- "The Right to Die". Forum 94 (1935): 297–300.

=== Self-publications ===
The Forerunner. Seven volumes, 1909–16. Microfiche. New York: Greenwood, 1968.

=== Selected lectures ===
There are 90 reports of the lectures that Gilman gave in the United States and Europe.

- "Club News". Weekly Nationalist, June 21, 1890: 6. [Re. "On Human Nature".]
- "Our Place Today", Los Angeles Woman's Club, January 21, 1891.
- "With Women Who Write". San Francisco Examiner, March 1891, 3:3. [Re. "The Coming Woman".]
- "Safeguards Suggested for Social Evils". San Francisco Call, April 24, 1892: 12:4.
- "The Labor Movement". Alameda County Federation of Trades, 1893. Alameda County, CA Labor Union Meetings. September 2, 1892.
- "Announcement". Impress 1 (1894): 2. [Re. Series of "Talks on Social Questions".]
- "All the Comforts of a Home". San Francisco Examiner, May 22, 1895: 9. [Re. "Simplicity and Decoration".]
- "The Washington Convention". Woman's Journal, February 15, 1896: 49–50. [Re. California.]
- "Woman Suffrage League". Boston Advertiser, November 10, 1897: 8:1. [Re. "The Economic Basis of the Woman Question".]
- "Bellamy Memorial Meeting". American Fabian 4: (1898): 3.
- "An Evening With Kipling". Daily Argus, March 14, 1899: 4:2.
- "Scientific Training of Domestic Servants". Women and Industrial Life, Vol. 6 of International Congress of Women of 1899. Ed Countess of Aberdeen. London: T. Unwin Fisher, 1900. 109.
- "Society and the Child". Brooklyn Eagle, December 11, 1902: 8:4.
- "Woman and Work/ Popular Fallacy that They are a Leisure Class, Says Mrs. Gilman". New York Tribune, February 26, 1903: 7:1.
- "A New Light on the Woman Question". Woman's Journal, April 25, 1904: 76–77.
- "Straight Talk by Mrs. Gilman is Looked For". San Francisco Call, July 16, 1905: 33:2.
- "Women and Social Service". Warren: National American Woman Suffrage Association, 1907.
- "Higher Marriage Mrs. Gilman's Plea". New York Times, December 29, 1908: 2:3.
- "Three Women Leaders in Hub". Boston Post, December 7, 1909: 1:1–2 and 14:5–6.
- "Warless World When Women's Slavery Ends". San Francisco Examiner, November 14, 1910: 4:1.
- "Lecture Given by Mrs. Gilman". San Francisco Call, November 15, 1911: 7:3. [Re. "The Society-- Body and Soul".]
- "Mrs. Gilman Assorts Sins". New York Times, June 3, 1913: 3:8
- "Adam the Real Rib, Mrs. Gilman Insists". New York Times, February 19, 1914: 9:3.
- "Advocates a 'World City.'" New York Times, January 6, 1915: 15:5. [Re. Arbitration of diplomatic disputes by an international agency.]
- "The Listener". Boston Transcript, April 14, 1917: 14:1. [Re. Announcement of lecture series.]
- "Great Duty for Women After War". Boston Post, February 26, 1918: 2:7.
- "Mrs. Gilman Urges Hired Mother Idea". New York Times, September 23, 1919: 36:1–2.
- "Eulogize Susan B. Anthony". New York Times, February 16, 1920: 15:6. [Re. Gilman and others eulogize Anthony on the centenary of her birth.]
- "Walt Whitman Dinner". New York Times, June 1, 1921: 16:7. [Gilman speaks at annual meeting of Whitman Society in New York.]
- "Fiction of America Being Melting Pot Unmasked by CPG". Dallas Morning News, February 15, 1926: 9:7–8 and 15:8.
- The Essential Lectures of Charlotte Perkins Gilman, 1890-1894 (2024).

=== Diaries, journals, biographies, and letters ===
- Charlotte Perkins Gilman: The Making of a Radical Feminist. Mary A. Hill. Philadelphia: Temple University Press, 1980.
- A Journey from Within: The Love Letters of Charlotte Perkins Gilman, 1897–1900. Ed. Mary A. Hill. Lewisburg: Bucknill UP, 1995.
- The Diaries of Charlotte Perkins Gilman, 2 Vols. Ed. Denise D. Knight. Charlottesville: University Press of Virginia, 1994.

=== Autobiography ===
- The Living of Charlotte Perkins Gilman: An Autobiography. New York and London: D. Appleton-Century Co., 1935; NY: Arno Press, 1972; and Harper & Row, 1975.

=== Academic studies ===
- Allen, Judith (2009). The Feminism of Charlotte Perkins Gilman: Sexualities, Histories, Progressivism, University of Chicago Press, ISBN 978-0-226-01463-0
- Allen, Polly Wynn (1988). Building Domestic Liberty: Charlotte Perkins Gilman's Architectural Feminism, University of Massachusetts Press, ISBN 0-87023-627-X
- Berman, Jeffrey. "The Unrestful Cure: Charlotte Perkins Gilman and 'The Yellow Wallpaper.'" In The Captive Imagination: A Casebook on The Yellow Wallpaper, edited by Catherine Golden. New York: Feminist Press, 1992, pp. 211–41.
- Carter-Sanborn, Kristin. "Restraining Order: The Imperialist Anti-Violence of Charlotte Perkins Gilman". Arizona Quarterly 56.2 (Summer 2000): 1–36.
- Ceplair, Larry, ed. Charlotte Perkins Gilman: A Nonfiction Reader. New York: Columbia UP, 1991.
- Class, Claire Marie. "Chloroformed: Anesthetic Utopianism and Eugenic Feminism in Charlotte Perkins Gilman's Herland and Other Works". Legacy 41.1 (2024): 75–98.
- Davis, Cynthia J. Charlotte Perkins Gilman: A Biography (Stanford University Press; 2010) 568 pages; major scholarly biography
- Davis, Cynthia J. and Denise D. Knight. Charlotte Perkins Gilman and Her Contemporaries: Literary and Intellectual Contexts. Tuscaloosa: University of Alabama Press, 2004.
- Deegan, Mary Jo. "Introduction". With Her in Ourland: Sequel to Herland. Eds. Mary Jo Deegan and Michael R. Hill. Westport, CT: Praeger, 1997. 1–57.
- Eldredge, Charles C. Charles Walter Stetson, Color, and Fantasy. Lawrence: Spencer Museum of Art, The U of Kansas, 1982.
- Ganobcsik-Williams, Lisa. "The Intellectualism of Charlotte Perkins Gilman: Evolutionary Perspectives on Race, Ethnicity, and Gender". Charlotte Perkins Gilman: Optimist Reformer. Eds. Jill Rudd and Val Gough. Iowa City: U of Iowa P, 1999.
- Golden, Catherine. The Captive Imagination: A Casebook on The Yellow Wallpaper. New York: Feminist Press, 1992.

---. "`Written to Drive Nails With’: Recalling the Early Poetry of Charlotte Perkins Gilman". in Charlotte Perkins Gilman: Optimist Reformer. Eds. Jill Rudd and Val Gough. Iowa City: U of Iowa P, 1999. 243-66.

- Gough, Val. "`In the Twinkling of an Eye’: Gilman's Utopian Imagination". in A Very Different Story: Studies on the Fiction of Charlotte Perkins Gilman. Eds. Val Gough and Jill Rudd. Liverpool: Liverpool UP, 1998. 129–43.
- Gubar, Susan. "She in Herland: Feminism as Fantasy". in Charlotte Perkins Gilman: The Woman and Her Work. Ed. Sheryl L. Meyering. Ann Arbor: UMI Research Press, 1989. 191–201.
- Hill, Mary Armfield. "Charlotte Perkins Gilman and the Journey From Within". in A Very Different Story: Studies on the Fiction of Charlotte Perkins Gilman. Eds. Val Gough and Jill Rudd. Liverpool: Liverpool UP, 1998. 8–23.
- Hill, Mary A. Charlotte Perkins Gilman: The Making of a Radical Feminist. (Temple University Press, 1980).
- Horowitz, Helen Lefkowitz, Wild Unrest: Charlotte Perkins Gilman and the Making of "The Yellow Wall-Paper" (New York: Oxford University Press, 2010).
- Huber, Hannah, "Charlotte Perkins Gilman". Dictionary of Literary Biography, Volume 381: Writers on Women's Rights and United States Suffrage, edited by George P. Anderson. Gale, pp. 140–52.
- Huber, Hannah, "‘The One End to Which Her Whole Organism Tended’: Social Evolution in Edith Wharton and Charlotte Perkins Gilman". Critical Insights: Edith Wharton, edited by Myrto Drizou, Salem Press, pp. 48–62.
- Huber, Hannah, "'Rest and Power': The Social Currency of Sleep in Charlotte Perkins Gilman’s Forerunner". in "Sleep Fictions: Rest and Its Deprivations in Progressive-Era Literature". U of Illinois P, 2024.
- Karpinski, Joanne B., "The Economic Conundrum in the Lifewriting of Charlotte Perkins Gilman. in The Mixed Legacy of Charlotte Perkins Gilman. Ed. Catherine J. Golden and Joanne S. Zangrando. U of Delaware P, 2000. 35–46.
- Kessler, Carol Farley. "Dreaming Always of Lovely Things Beyond’: Living Toward Herland, Experiential foregrounding". in The Mixed Legacy of Charlotte Perkins Gilman, Eds. Catherine J. Golden and Joanna Schneider Zangrando. Newark: U of Delaware P, 2000. 89–103.
- Knight, Denise D. Charlotte Perkins Gilman: A Study of the Short Fiction, Twayne Studies in Short Fiction (Twayne Publishers, 1997).

Knight, Denise D. "Charlotte Perkins Gilman and the Shadow of Racism". American Literary Realism, vol. 32, no. 2, 2000, pp. 159–169. JSTOR, www.jstor.org/stable/27746975.
Knight, Denise D. "Introduction". Herland, `The Yellow Wall-Paper’ and Selected Writings. New York: Penguin, 1999.

- Lane, Ann J. "Gilman, Charlotte Perkins"; American National Biography Online, 2000.

Lane, Ann J. "The Fictional World of Charlotte Perkins Gilman". in The Charlotte Perkins Gilman Reader. Ed. Ann J. Lane. New York: Pantheon, 1980.
Lane, Ann J. "Introduction". Herland: A Lost Feminist Utopian Novel by Charlotte Perkins Gilman. 1915. Rpt. New York: Pantheon Books, 1979
Lane, Ann J. To Herland and Beyond: The Life of Charlotte Perkins Gilman. New York: Pantheon, 1990.

- Lanser, Susan S. "Feminist Criticism, 'The Yellow Wallpaper,' and the Politics of Color in America". Feminist Studies, Vol. 15, No. 3, Feminist Reinterpretations/Reinterpretations of Feminism (Autumn, 1989), pp. 415–441. JSTOR, Reprinted in "The Yellow Wallpaper": Charlotte Perkins Gilman. Eds. Thomas L. Erskine and Connie L. Richards. New Brunswick: Rutgers UP, 1993. 225–256.
- Long, Lisa A. "Herland and the Gender of Science". in MLA Approaches to Teaching Gilman's The Yellow Wall-Paper and Herland. Eds. Denise D. Knight and Cynthia J. David. New York: Modern Language Association of America, 2003. 125–132.
- Mitchell, S. Weir, M.D. "Camp Cure". Nurse and Patient, and Camp Cure. Philadelphia: Lippincott, 1877

Mitchell, S. Weir. Wear and Tear, or Hints for the Overworked. 1887. New York: Arno Press, 1973.

- Oliver, Lawrence J. "W. E. B. Du Bois, Charlotte Perkins Gilman, and ‘A Suggestion on the Negro Problem.’" American Literary Realism, vol. 48, no. 1, 2015, pp. 25–39. JSTOR, www.jstor.org/stable/10.5406/amerlitereal.48.1.0025.
- Oliver, Lawrence J. and Gary Scharnhorst. "Charlotte Perkins Gilman v. Ambrose Bierce: The Literary Politics of Gender in Fin-de-Siècle California". Journal of the West (July 1993): 52–60.
- Palmeri, Ann. "Charlotte Perkins Gilman: Forerunner of a Feminist Social Science". in Discovering Reality: Feminist Perspectives on Epistemology, Metaphysics, Methodology and Philosophy of Science. Eds. Sandra Harding and Merrill B. Hintikka. Dordrecht: Reidel, 1983. 97–120.
- Scharnhorst, Gary. Charlotte Perkins Gilman. Boston: Twayne, 1985. Studies Gilman as writer.
- Scharnhorst, Gary, and Denise D. Knight. "Charlotte Perkins Gilman's Library: A Reconstruction". Resources for American Literary Studies 23:2 (1997): 181–219.
- Stetson, Charles Walter. Endure: The Diaries of Charles Walter Stetson. Ed. Mary A. Hill. Philadelphia: Temple UP, 1985.
- Tuttle, Jennifer S. "Rewriting the West Cure: Charlotte Perkins Gilman, Owen Wister, and the Sexual Politics of Neurasthenia". The Mixed Legacy of Charlotte Perkins Gilman. Eds. Catherine J. Golden and Joanna Schneider Zangrando. Newark: U of Delaware P, 2000. 103–121.
- Von Rosk, Nancy. "Women, Work and Cross-Class Alliances in the Fiction of Charlotte Perkins Gilman". Working Women in American Literature, 1865–1950. Miriam Gogol ed. New York: Rowman and Littlefield, 2018. 69–91.
- Wegener, Frederick. "What a Comfort a Woman Doctor Is!’ Medical Women in the Life and Writing of Charlotte Perkins Gilman. In Charlotte Perkins Gilman: Optimist Reformer. Eds. Jill Rudd & Val Gough. Iowa City: U of Iowa P, 1999. 45–73.
- Weinbaum, Alys Eve. "Writing Feminist Genealogy: Charlotte Perkins Gilman, Racial Nationalism, and the Reproduction of Maternalist Feminism". Feminist Studies 27 (Summer 2001): 271–30.
