= Women and Economics =

Charlotte Perkins Gilman's book

Women and Economics - A Study of the Economic Relation Between Men and Women as a Factor in Social Evolution
- Author: Charlotte Perkins Gilman
- Language: English
- Publisher: Small, Maynard & Company, et al
- Publication date: 1898
- Publication place: United States
- Pages: 389

Women and Economics – A Study of the Economic Relation Between Men and Women as a Factor in Social Evolution is a book written by Charlotte Perkins Gilman and published in 1898. It is considered by many to be her single greatest work, and as with much of Gilman's writing, the book touched a few dominant themes: the transformation of marriage, the family, and the home, with her central argument: “the economic independence and specialization of women as essential to the improvement of marriage, motherhood, domestic industry, and racial improvement.”

The 1890s were a period of intense political debate and economic challenges, with the Women's Movement seeking the vote and other reforms. Women were “entering the work force in swelling numbers, seeking new opportunities, and shaping new definitions of themselves.” It was near the end of this tumultuous decade that Gilman's very popular book emerged.

== Summary and themes ==
Centrally, Gilman argues that women must change their cultural identities. Early on, she mentions that humans are the only species in which the female has to depend on the male for survival. This dependence requires women to pay off their debt through domestic services, or “sex-functions”. Gilman argues that women “work longer and harder than most men, and not solely in maternal duties.” Further, Gilman states that female activities in general are directed by men. These sexual distinctions have led to an odd distribution of power and have been detrimental to both genders, in Gilman's view.

These sexual distinctions have left women behind and allowed men to claim credit for human progress. Gilman argues that women fulfill the dual roles of mother and martyr, and pass these roles down to their children, creating a continuing image of women as unpaid workers and nurturers. This in turn, has stunted women's creative and personal growth.

Gilman was a confirmed suffragist, but did not believe progress would happen if women were only given the vote. Progress was not measured only by states that allowed women to vote, but as well “in the changes legal, social, mental and physical, which mark the advance of the mother of the world toward her full place.”

Gilman also reflects on the strange fact that poorer women who can least afford it, have more children, while wealthy women who can afford it, have fewer children. Gilman talks about the agricultural age, when more children were needed to assist with farming. In the industrial age however, more children result in more work for the mother. Gilman argued all these points, but still believed motherhood was “the common duty and the common glory of womanhood,” and women would choose “professions compatible with motherhood."

Along with being nurturers, Gilman argues that women are also required to be educators. There is no proof in Gilman's opinion however, that women who sacrifice to be nurturers and educators will produce better children. Gilman believes that others can assist with these tasks or even do them more effectively. Gilman was one of the first to propose the professionalization of housework, encouraging women to hire housekeepers and cooks to release them from housework. Gilman envisioned kitchenless houses and designed cooperative kitchens in city apartment buildings which would further help women balance work and family and provide some social support for wives who were still homebound. This would allow women to participate in the workforce and lead a more worldly life. Gilman believed that women could desire home and family life, but should not have to retain complete responsibility of these areas. Gilman stated that these changes would eventually result in “better motherhood and fatherhood, better babyhood and childhood, better food, better homes, better society.”

== Reception ==
Women and Economics was published to generally positive reviews, and Gilman became “the leading intellectual in the women’s movement” almost overnight. The book was translated into seven different languages and was often compared favorably to John Stuart Mill’s The Subjection of Women. The book was also well received among academics, despite its lack of academic scholarship. Conservative reviewers even respected the book, albeit slightly grudgingly. One reviewer for The Independent wrote, “While the ideas of this author may not appeal to us, we must admit that there is some force in her criticisms, and some reason in her suggestions.” Gilman's feminist friends and colleagues praised the book upon its release, with Jane Addams calling it a “masterpiece,” and Florence Kelley writing that it was “the first real, substantial contribution made by a woman to the science of economics.” Miriam Schneir also included this text in her anthology, Feminism: The Essential Historical Writings, labelling it as one of the essential works of feminism.

Not all reviews were as positive though. The Chicago Tribune wrote that the book “lacks beauty; it is too clever…it stirs no deep reverberations of the soul…but you can quote it, and remember its points.”

== Interpretation and analysis ==
Most of Gilman's future writings, fiction and nonfiction, would touch on ideas and concepts introduced in Women and Economics. Many of the reforms proposed by Gilman, such as professionalization of child raising and housework, were considered radical at the time of her writing. Gilman states in the book that she opposes corporal punishment, believing instead that parents should explain their reasoning to their children. Gilman also advised having an open discussion about sex (despite her uneasiness regarding the subject and her near denouncement of sexual pleasures in general).

Scholars have pointed out that Gilman drew upon several different sources to create her synthesis. She borrowed the concept that the realm of production is central to human life and that the workplace is the area of both oppression and liberation from Karl Marx, while applying it to gender, rather than solely class. From Charles Darwin, she used the theory of evolution, and ultimately Social Darwinism, that permeates much of the book. She took the idea that women are object of exchange between men from Thorstein Veblen; and from sociologist Lester Ward, she borrowed the idea that women, rather than men, originated evolution and species. While Gilman drew upon these thinkers for concepts, she did not become part of the movements they inspired.

Gilman was also very influenced by Edward Bellamy and his work Looking Backward, as seen in her kitchenless home and the other technical advances she advocated to help with housework.

Gilman has been called the “most original feminist the United States has ever produced,” but she rejected the term “feminist”, as she was very uncomfortable with the sexual liberation mantra that had become an important segment of feminist thought. Barbara Ehrenreich and Deirdre English, two feminist scholars, stated that Women and Economics was “the theoretical breakthrough for a whole generation of feminists, [for it] appealed not to right or morality but to evolutionary theory.” Conversely, one scholar stated that “Gilman’s evolutionary feminism does not provide contemporary feminism with a model to emulate,” despite its frequent use in university classrooms, but rather offers an alternative view of the social problems faced by women.

In Women and Economics, Gilman looks at the intersection between gender and class, but almost completely ignores race. It seems quite clear that when she does refer to “the race,” she is referring to a solely white race. In various other works, she refers to other races as inferior and belonging to a lower part of the evolutionary ladder, “echoing the very social Darwinist sentiments that she despised when applied to gender”.
