= Ann J. Lane =

- Born: July 27, 1931; Brooklyn, New York, U.S.
- Died: May 27, 2013 (aged 81); New York, U.S.
- Occupations: Historian, educator, writer, college professor
- Spouse(s): Eugene Genovese; William Haywood Nuchow
- Relatives: Mark Lane (brother)

Ann J. Lane (July 27, 1931 – May 27, 2013) was an American educator, historian, and author that was considered to be a pioneer in the fields of women’s history and women’s studies. Before retiring in 2009 she worked at the University of Virginia as a professor of history and director of the women’s studies program.

== Early life and education ==
Lane was born in Brooklyn, New York, the daughter of Harry A. Lane and Betty Brown Lane. Her father was an accountant. She graduated from Brooklyn College with a bachelor's degree in English in 1952. She earned a master's degree in sociology from New York University in 1958, and completed doctoral studies in American history from Columbia University in 1968. Her brother was the lawyer and activist Mark Lane.

== Career ==
Lane taught at Douglass College Rutgers University from 1968 to 1971, and at John Jay College of Criminal Justice from 1971 to 1983. She debated anthropologist Lionel Tiger at the first Berkshire Conference of Women Historians in 1973. From 1977 to 1983, she held a research fellowship at the Harvard Radcliffe Institute. She established women's studies programs at Colgate University, where she taught from 1983 to 1990, and at the University of Virginia, where she was a professor from 1990 to 2009. She retired in 2009.

In 2005, the History News Network published a report about accusations of plagiarism in Lane's 1968 dissertation. Lane herself admitted there were unattributed passages that should have been credited to other authors, but denied any intent to deceive.

== Publications ==
- The Debate over Slavery: Stanley Elkins and His Critics (1971)
- The Brownsville Affair: National Crisis and Black Reaction (1971)
- Mary Ritter Beard: A Sourcebook (1977)
- To Herland and Beyond: The Life and Work of Charlotte Perkins Gilman (1990)
- "'Consensual' relations in the academy: Gender, power, and sexuality" (1998)

=== As editor ===
- The Living of Charlotte Perkins Gilman by Charlotte Perkins Gilman (1991)

== Personal life ==
Lane was married to historian Eugene Genovese. Her second husband was labor leader William Haywood Nuchow. She had two daughters and died in 2013, at the age of 81, in New York.
