= The Forerunner =

US magazine

The Forerunner is a print publication (1981-1994) and website (1996-present) that emphasizes reformation of society and biblical worldview. Contributing editors and correspondents from Russia, Ukraine, China, Latin America, South Africa and many other countries have contributed many of the articles. Students are encouraged to reprint the articles in student newspapers with the online version functioning as a "model publication."

In 1993, The Forerunner International was founded by Jay Rogers and versions of The Forerunner were published in nations such as South Africa, Russia, Ukraine, China and America. The Forerunner exists today as a grass-roots organization which is dedicated to the training of student interns to produce media. The stated goal to help fulfill the Great Commission (Matthew 28:18–20) through the arts.

== History ==
The Forerunner was founded by Bob Weiner and Rose Weiner and Maranatha Campus Ministries in 1981. It was conceived as a publication which would reach young people with the message of the Christian faith and especially conservativism as a counterpoint to liberalism. The method was calculated: to influence the thinking of students with biblical principles through the distribution of newspapers on the university campuses of America.

By 1983, thirty-five conservative newspapers had been started on major secular campuses and the number doubled by 1985. Even at the University of California, Berkeley campus, which had long carried the reputation of being the most liberal of academic institutions in the U.S., students were following that trend: One survey proved that twice as many Berkeley students considered themselves conservative as did those in 1971. Today there are hundreds of conservative and Christian newspapers on otherwise liberal university campuses.

The Forerunner addressed issues which were at the center of campus debate. The newspaper presented biblical alternatives to Marxism, feminism and welfare statism. The Forerunner challenged the student audience to re-evaluate the liberal bias taught in the classroom.

== Foreign language editions ==
By 1988, foreign language versions of The Forerunner were published by Maranatha Campus Ministries in Brazil, Indonesia and Venezuela. Among them:

- The Russian Predvestnik , was produced in Kyiv, Ukraine. This student-run publication was founded in July 1991.
- The Chinese The Mandate is produced by Churches Serving Internationals (CSI) to produce a Chinese publication, in English and Chinese, which reached Chinese students studying in the United States. The on-line version has made an impact on students and intellectuals throughout China.
- The Spanish El Campeón , a Spanish newspaper, was produced in cooperation with Champions for Christ (Campeones para Cristo) for Latin America. The goal was to distribute the newspaper in the high school and college campuses during evangelism outreaches in countries such as Peru, Costa Rica, Nicaragua, Honduras, Panama and Colombia. Some copies were also distributed in Cuba.
