= Logan (given name) =

- Pronunciation: /ˈloʊɡən/
- Gender: Unisex
- Language: English

Origin
- Language: Scottish Gaelic
- Origin: Logan (surname)
- Derivation: lag
- Meaning: "Little Hollow"
- Region of origin: Scotland

The given name Logan is derived from the Scottish surname Logan, which is in turn derived from a place-name. The likely origin of this surname is a place located near Auchinleck, in Ayrshire. The place-name is derived from the Scottish Gaelic lagan, which is a diminutive of lag, which in turn means "hollow". The given name is borne generally by men, but occasionally by women.

The given name was the 17th most-popular name for baby-boys born in the United States in 2007 and was the 455th most-popular name for baby-girls born there in 2007. It was the 54th most-popular name for baby-boys born in England and Wales in 2007 and was the 12th most popular name for boys born in Scotland in 2007 and the fourth most-popular in 2009. It was also among the top 100 most-popular names for boys in Canada, Australia, France, and Belgium in the last five years. In 2017 it was the 5th most-popular in the U.S., 3rd in Canada, 10th in Northern Ireland, and 6th in Scotland. By 2022, it had dropped to 14th in Canada.

== People with the given name ==
=== A ===
- Logan Alexander (born 1986), Bermudian footballer
- Logan Allen (disambiguation), multiple people
- Logan Angers (born 2000), Canadian ice hockey player
- Logan Arens (born 1996), American actor
- Logan Asplin (born 1988), New Zealand rugby union coach
- Logan Astley (born 2003), English rugby league footballer
- Logan Austin (born 1995), Australian-rules soccer player

=== B ===
- Logan Bailly (born 1985), Belgian footballer
- Logan Baldwin (born 1996), American baseball player
- Logan Bartholomew (born 1984), American actor
- Logan Bayliss-Brow (born 1999), Scottish rugby league footballer
- Logan Bearden (born 1995), American racing driver
- Logan Beirne, American entrepreneur
- Logan Edwin Bleckley (1827–1907), American lawyer and jurist
- Logan Bolopue (born 1994), American motorcycle racer
- Logan Bonner (born 1998), American football player
- Logan Brill, American singer-songwriter
- Logan Brown (ice hockey) (born 1998), Canadian-American ice hockey player
- Logan Brown (activist), British trans activist
- Logan Brown (American football) (born 2001), American football player
- Logan Browning (born 1989), American actress
- Logan Bruss (born 1999), American football player
- Logan Bye (born 1998), American ice dancer

=== C ===
- Logan Campbell (disambiguation), multiple people
- Logan Cerny (born 1999), American baseball player
- Logan Chalmers (born 2000), Scottish footballer
- Logan Clark (born 1985), American mixed martial artist
- Logan Clark (racing driver) (born 2003/2004), American stock car racing driver
- Logan Clendening (1884–1945), American physician
- Logan Cooke (born 1995), American football player
- Logan Cooley (born 2004), American ice hockey player
- Logan Costa (born 2001), Cape Verdean footballer
- Logan Couture (born 1989), Canadian ice hockey player
- Logan Crowley (born 1996), New Zealand rugby union footballer
- Logan Cunningham (disambiguation), multiple people
- Logan Currie (born 2001), New Zealand cyclist

=== D ===
- Logan Darnell (born 1989), American baseball player
- Logan Davidson (born 1997), American baseball player
- Logan Delaurier-Chaubet (born 2002), French footballer
- Logan Dooley (born 1987), American gymnast
- Logan Drake (1899–1940), American baseball player
- Logan Duncomb (born 2003), American basketball player

=== E ===
- Logan Easley (born 1961), American baseball player
- Logan Edwards (born 1968), New Zealand rugby league footballer
- Logan Emory (born 1988), American soccer player
- Logan Evans (disambiguation), multiple people

=== F ===
- Logan Fano (born 2002), American football player
- Logan Ferland (born 1997), Canadian football player
- Logan Fontaine (born 1999), French swimmer
- Logan Forsythe (born 1987), American baseball player

=== G ===
- Logan Gdula (born 1996), American soccer player
- Logan George (born 1990), American film director
- Logan Gilbert (born 1997), American baseball player
- Logan Gillaspie (born 1997), American baseball player
- Logan Giulietti-Schmitt (born 1985), American ice dancer
- Logan Green (born 1983/1984), American entrepreneur
- Logan Gray (born 1986), Scottish curler
- Logan Guleff (born 2002), American television personality

=== H ===
- Logan Hall (born 2000), American football player
- Logan Hay (1871–1942), American lawyer and politician
- Logan Henderson (born 1989), American actor and singer
- Logan Henry (born 1996), New Zealand rugby union footballer
- Logan Hensler (born 2006), American ice hockey player
- Logan Hensley (1900–1971), American baseball player
- Logan Hicks (born 1971), American artist
- Logan Howlett, Australian politician
- Logan Huffman (born 1989), American actor
- Logan Hughes (born 2005), American baseball player
- Logan Hutchings (born 1984), New Zealand cyclist

=== I ===
- Logan Ice (born 1995), American baseball player
- Logan Ireland, American military personnel

=== J ===
- Logan James (born 1998), American professional wrestler
- Logan Jiménez (born 2008), Bermudian footballer
- Logan Jones (born 2001), American football player
- Logan Jones (racing driver), American racing driver

=== K ===
- Logan Kanapathi, Canadian politician
- Logan Kensing (born 1982), American baseball player
- Logan Ketterer (born 1993), American soccer player
- Logan Kilgore (born 1990), American football player
- Logan Kilpatrick, American software engineer

=== L ===
- Logan Lee (born 2000), American football player
- Logan Leistikow (born 1984), American filmmaker
- Logan Lerman (born 1992), American actor
- Logan Long (1878–1933), American politician
- Logan T. Ludwig (born 1945/1946), American religious figure
- Logan Lynn (born 1979), American musician

=== M ===
- Logan MacMillan (born 1989), Canadian ice hockey player
- Logan Mader (born 1970), Canadian guitarist
- Logan Mailloux (born 2003), Canadian ice hockey player
- Logan Manhart (born 1998), American politician
- Logan Mankins (born 1982), American football player
- Logan Marshall (1883–1937), American author
- Logan Marshall-Green (born 1976), American actor
- Logan Martin (disambiguation), multiple people
- Logan McDonald (born 2002), Australian rules footballer
- Logan McGuinness (born 1987), Canadian boxer
- Logan McMenamie (born 1950), Scottish-Canadian bishop
- Logan Miller (born 1992), American actor
- Logan Misuraca (born 1999), American stock car racing driver
- Logan Mitchell (disambiguation), multiple people
- Logan Mize (born 1985), American singer-songwriter
- Logan Moffitt (born 2001), Canadian influencer
- Logan Monson, American politician
- Logan Morris (1889–1977), American judge
- Logan Morrison (born 1987), American baseball player
- Logan Moy (born 2005), English rugby league footballer
- Logan Mulvey (born 1984), American entrepreneur
- Logan Murray (born 1958), American comedian

=== N ===
- Logan Ndenbe (born 2000), Belgian footballer
- Logan Neidlinger (born 2005), American soccer player
- Logan Nelson (born 1996), American composer
- Logan Nicoll, American politician

=== O ===
- Logan O'Brien (born 1992), American actor
- Logan O'Connor (born 1996), American ice hockey player
- Logan O'Hoppe (born 2000), American baseball player
- Logan Ondrusek (born 1985), American baseball player
- Logan Owen (born 1995), American cyclist

=== P ===
- Logan Waller Page (1870–1918), American academic administrator
- Logan Panchot (born 1998), American soccer player
- Logan Paul (born 1995), American social media personality
- Logan Paulsen (born 1987), American football player
- Logan Pause (born 1981), American soccer player
- Logan Payne (born 1985), American football player
- Logan Phillips (born 1982), American politician
- Logan Polish (born 2001), American actress
- Logan Powell (born 1999), Australian Paralympic swimmer
- Logan Pye (born 2003), English footballer

=== R ===
- Logan Ramsey (1921–2000), American actor
- Logan Reddemann (born 2005), American baseball player
- Logan Richardson (born 1980), American musician
- Logan Richardson (boxer) (born 2000), English boxer
- Logan Rogerson (born 1998), New Zealand footballer
- Logan H. Roots (1841–1893), American politician
- Logan Russell (born 1999), Bahamian footballer
- Logan Ryan (born 1991), American football player

=== S ===
- Logan Sama (born 1990), English disc jockey
- Logan Sandler, American writer
- Logan Sankey (born 1998), American ski jumper
- Logan Sargeant (born 2000), American racing driver
- Logan Schafer (born 1986), American baseball player
- Logan Seavey (born 1997), American stock car racing driver
- Logan Shaw (born 1992), Canadian ice hockey player
- Logan Shore (born 1994), American baseball player
- Logan Sloane (1918–1980), New Zealand politician
- Logan Pearsall Smith (1865–1946), American essayist
- Logan Smothers (born 2000), American football player
- Logan Staats, Canadian singer-songwriter
- Logan Stankoven (born 2003), Canadian ice hockey player
- Logan Stanley (born 1998), Canadian ice hockey player
- Logan Stenberg (born 1997), American football player
- Logan Stephenson (born 1986), Canadian ice hockey player
- Logan Stieber (born 1991), American wrestler
- Logan Storley (born 1992), American mixed martial artist
- Logan Stretch (born 2006), Welsh footballer
- Logan Stutz (born 1988), American basketball player
- Logan Swann (born 1975), New Zealand rugby league footballer

=== T ===
- Logan Tanner (born 2000), American baseball player
- Logan Taylor (born 2002), Canadian football player
- Logan Thomas (born 1991), American football player
- Logan Thomas (film director) (born 1973), American film director
- Logan Thompson (born 1997), Canadian ice hockey player
- Logan Tom (born 1981), American volleyball player
- Logan Trotter (born 1998), Scottish rugby union footballer

=== U ===
- Logan Ury (born 1987/1988) American psychologist

=== V ===
- Logan van Beek (born 1990), New Zealand-Dutch cricketer
- Logan Vander Velden (born 1971), American basketball player
- Logan VanWey (born 1999), American baseball player
- Logan Archbold Vilas (1891–1976), American aviator

=== W ===
- Logan Wade (born 1992), Australian baseball player
- Logan Wallace (born 2005), New Zealand rugby union footballer
- Logan Warmoth (born 1995), American baseball player
- Logan Watkins (born 1989), American baseball player
- Logan Webb (born 1996), American baseball player
- Logan West (born 1994), American beauty queen
- Logan H. Westbrooks, American music executive
- Logan Weston (born 1992), English cricketer
- Logan Whitehurst (1977–2006), American musician
- Logan Wilde (born 1976), American politician
- Logan Williams (2003–2020), Canadian child actor
- Logan Wilson (born 1996), American football player
- Logan Woodside (born 1995), American football player
- Logan Wright (1933–1999), American psychologist
- Logan Wyatt (born 1997), American baseball player

=== Y ===
- Logan Young (1940–2006), American businessman
- Logan Yuzna (born 1987/1988), American artist

== Fictional characters ==
- Logan (film series character), also known as Wolverine, a character in the film series X-Men
- Logan 5, the protagonist of the novel Logan's Run and film adaptation
- Logan Roy, a character from the television series Succession
- Logan Cale, a character from the television series Dark Angel (American TV series).
