= Logan Thomas (film director) =

American film director (born 1973)

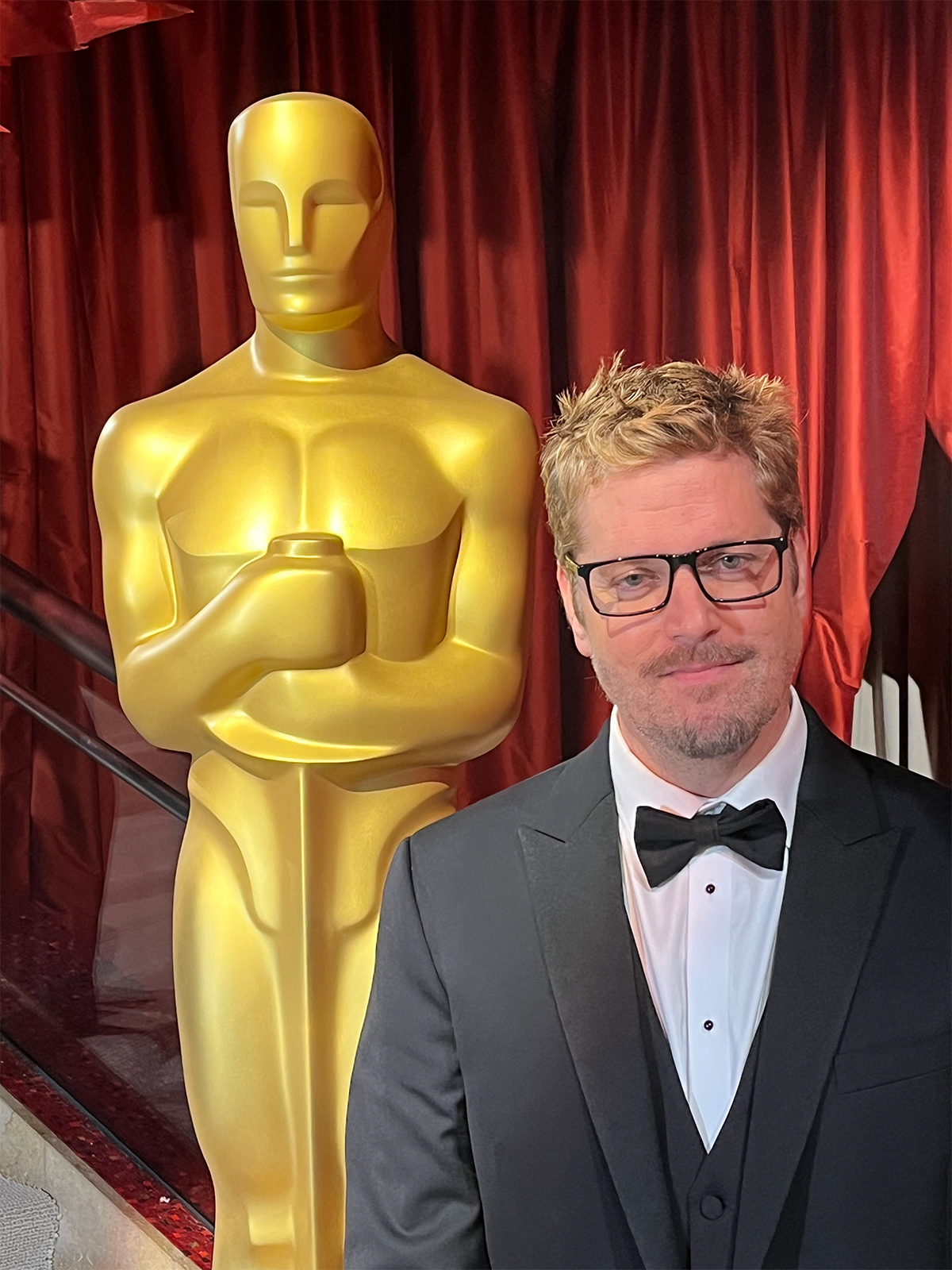
Director Logan Thomas. Academy Awards, 2023.

Logan Thomas (born 1973) is an American film director.

He made his first narrative short film, Demon Quest, at the age of 14. He told staff writer, Rick Reynolds, "Once I held that camera in my hand, I knew what I was going to do for the rest of my life." Demon Quest was shot on film for $40. Previously, at the Milford Middle School Science fair, he made Tyrannosaurs Dinosaur, and won the grand prize for his animated 3 minute film. In 2011, he created and ran The Los Angeles Fear and Fantasy Film Festival with Aric Cushing.

Between 2011 and 2012, his first feature film was released, entitled, The Yellow Wallpaper, starring Michael Moriarty, Veronica Cartwright, Aric Cushing, and Dale Dickey. The film traces the mental breakdown of a country doctor's wife in a remote farmhouse.

In 2020, his second feature film, There's No Such Thing as Vampires, was released and played at the Dances with Films, NOHO Cinefest Film Festival, and Frightfest London Film Festival. At the NOHO Cinefest Film Festival, he was nominated for Best Director. For the same film, 2021, he was nominated for Best Composer at the Filmquest Film Festival. The film, suggested by Aric Cushing, is about 'a couple people in the desert, basically being stalked by a nosferatu or vampire'. The film is a horror/road movie set in the American desert. Thomas wanted to do something closer to Mad Max or The Terminator to bring that level of myth to the vampire genre.
