= The Yellow Wallpaper =

1892 short story by Charlotte Perkins Gilman

- Short story by Charlotte Perkins Gilman
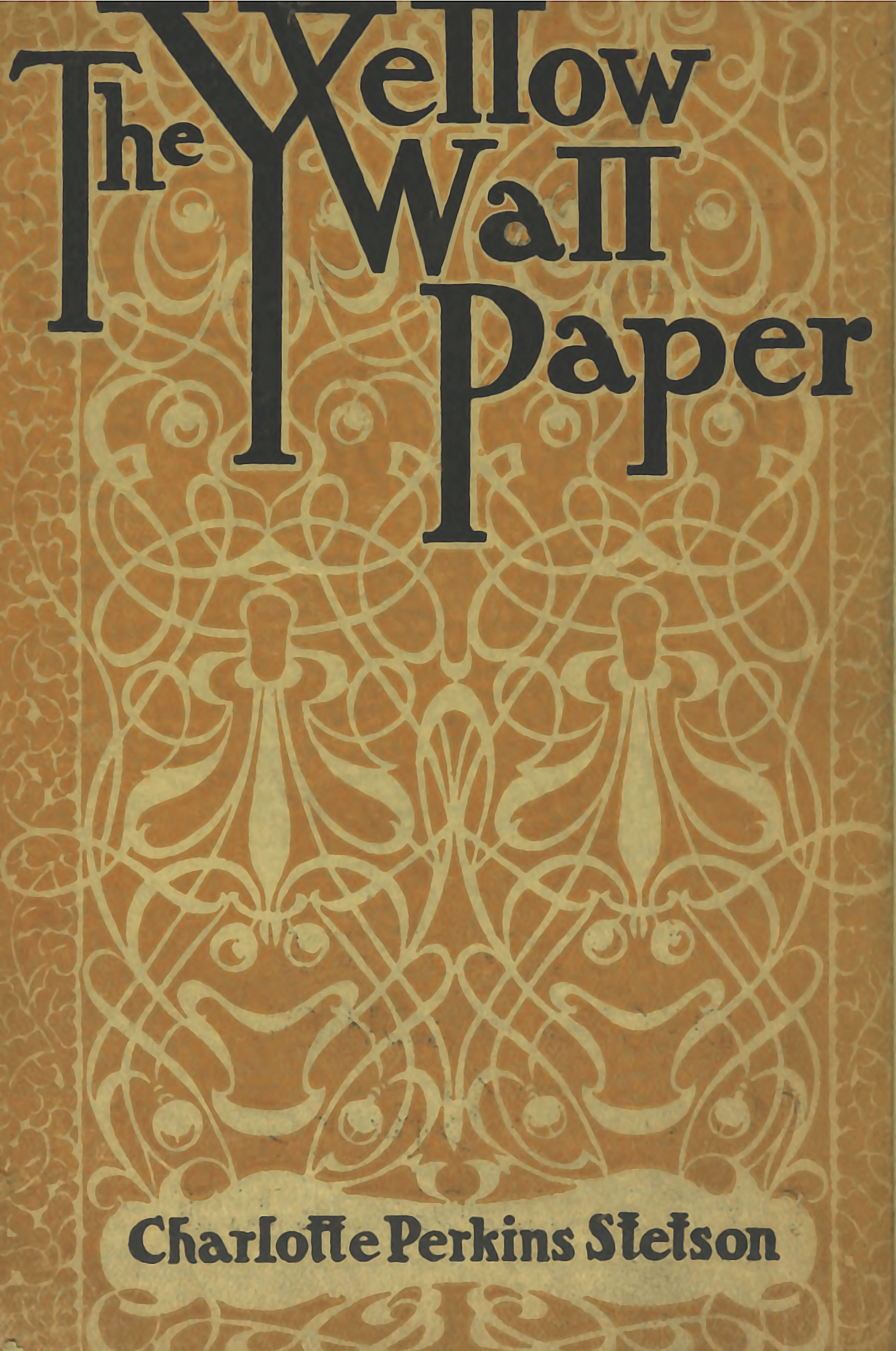
- Cover of a 1901 edition of The Yellow Wallpaper

Text available at Wikisource

Publication
- Publication date: 1892

"The Yellow Wallpaper" (original title: "The Yellow Wall-paper. A Story") is a short story by American writer Charlotte Perkins Gilman, first published in January 1892 in The New England Magazine. It is regarded as an important early work of American feminist literature for its illustration of the attitudes towards the mental and physical health of women in the 19th century. It is also lauded as an excellent work of horror fiction.

The story is written as a collection of journal entries narrated in the first person. The journal was written by a woman whose physician husband has rented an old mansion for the summer. Forgoing other rooms in the house, the husband confines the woman to an upstairs nursery. As a form of treatment, the husband forbids the journal writer from working or writing, and encourages her to eat well and get plenty of air so that she can recuperate from what he calls a "temporary nervous depression – a slight hysterical tendency", a common diagnosis in women at the time. As the reader continues through the journal entries, they experience the writer's gradual descent into madness with nothing better to do than observe the peeling yellow wallpaper in her room.

The story has been the subject of extensive feminist and psychoanalytic criticism and is often compared to Sylvia Plath's The Bell Jar for its depiction of mental illness, gendered expectations, and the search for agency. More recent interpretations have also explored the story through an ecogothic lens, emphasizing the unsettling role of the natural and domestic environment in shaping the protagonist's psychological breakdown.

== Plot summary ==
The story describes a young woman and her husband. He imposes a rest cure on her when she suffers "temporary nervous depression" after the birth of their baby. They spend the summer at a colonial mansion, where the narrator is largely confined to an upstairs nursery. The story makes striking use of an unreliable narrator in order to gradually reveal the degree to which her husband has "imprisoned" her due to her physical and mental condition. She describes torn wallpaper, barred windows, metal rings in the walls, a floor "scratched and gouged and splintered", a bed bolted to the floor, and a gate at the top of the stairs, but blames all these on children who must have resided there.

The narrator devotes many journal entries to describing the wallpaper in the room – its "sickly" color, its "yellow" smell, its bizarre and disturbing pattern like "an interminable string of toadstools, budding and sprouting in endless convolutions," its missing patches, and the way it leaves yellow smears on the skin and clothing of anyone who touches it. She describes how the longer one stays in the bedroom, the more the wallpaper appears to mutate, especially in the moonlight. With no stimulus other than the wallpaper, the pattern and designs become increasingly intriguing to the narrator. She soon begins to see a figure in the design. Eventually, she comes to believe that a woman is creeping on all fours behind the pattern. Believing she must free the woman in the wallpaper, she begins to strip the remaining paper off the wall.

When her husband arrives home, the narrator refuses to unlock her door. When he returns with the key, he finds her creeping around the room, rubbing against the wallpaper, and exclaiming, "I've got out at last… in spite of you." He faints, but she continues to circle the room, creeping over his inert body each time she passes it, believing herself to have become the woman trapped behind the yellow wallpaper.

== Author ==
Charlotte Perkins Gilman used her writing to explore the role of women in America around 1900. She expounded upon many issues, such as the lack of a life outside the home and the oppressive forces of a patriarchal society. Through her work, Gilman paved the way for writers such as Alice Walker and Sylvia Plath.

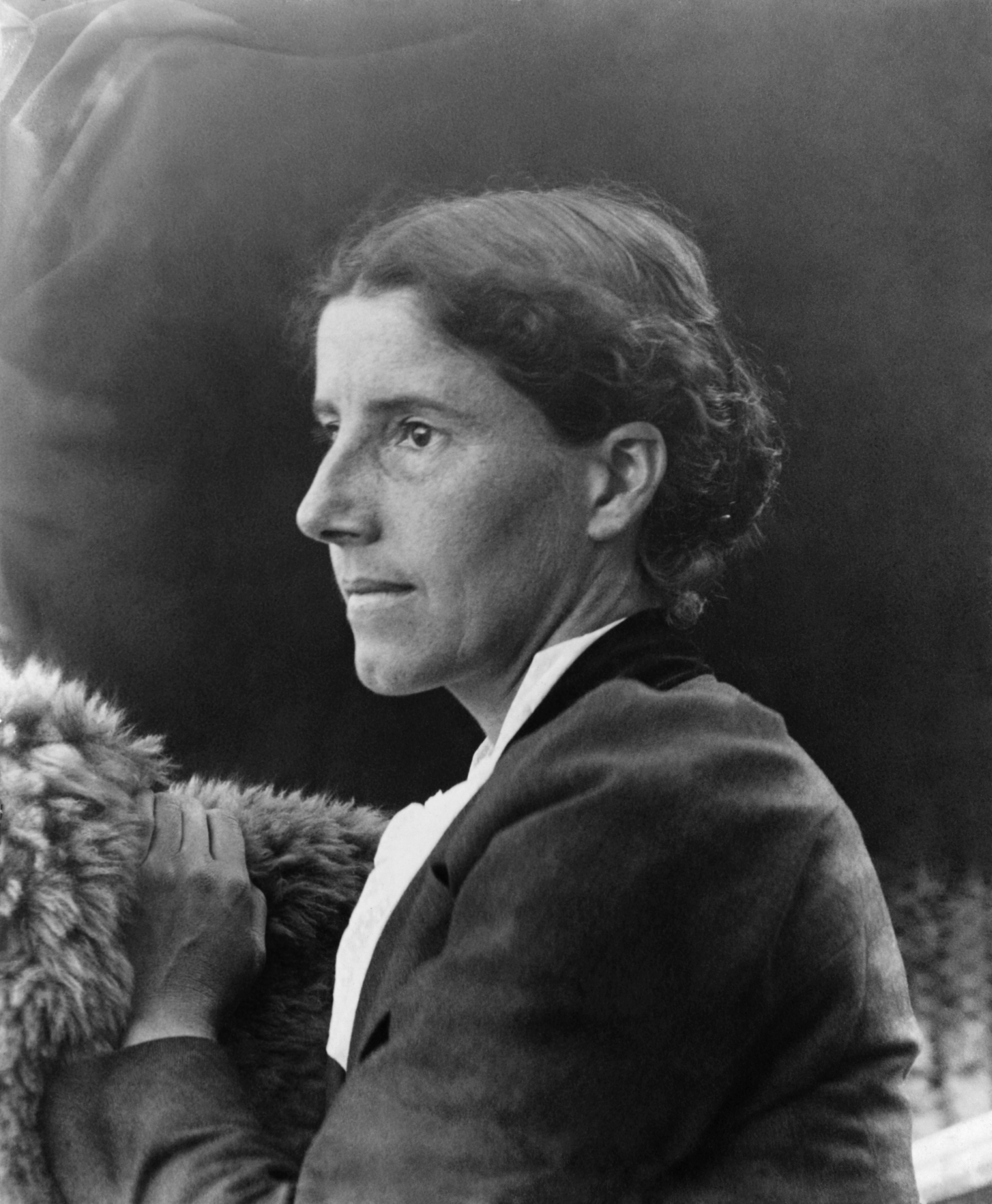
Charlotte Perkins Gilman, c. 1900

In "The Yellow Wallpaper," she portrays the narrator's insanity as a way to protest the professional and societal oppression against women. While under the impression that husbands and male doctors were acting with their best interests in mind, women were depicted as mentally fragile. Women's rights advocates of the era believed that the "outbreak" of this mental instability was the manifestation of their setbacks regarding the roles they were allowed to play in a male-dominated society. Quawas argues that women were even discouraged from writing because it would ultimately create an identity and become a form of defiance. Gilman realized that writing became one of the only forms of expression for women at a time when they had very few rights.

After the birth of her first daughter, Gilman suffered postnatal depression and was treated by Dr. Silas Weir Mitchell, the leading expert on women's mental health at the time. He suggested a strict 'rest cure' regimen involving much of bed rest and a blanket ban on working, including reading, writing, and painting. After three months and almost desperate, Gilman decided to contravene her diagnosis, along with the treatment methods, and started to work again. Aware of how close she had come to a complete mental breakdown, the author wrote "The Yellow Wallpaper" with additions and exaggerations to illustrate her criticism of the medical field. Gilman sent a copy to Mitchell but never received a response. Gilman was ultimately proven right in her disdain for the "rest cure" when she sought a second opinion from Mary Putnam Jacobi, one of the first female doctors and a strong opponent of this theory, who prescribed a regimen of physical and mental activity that proved a much more successful treatment.

She added that "The Yellow Wallpaper" was "not intended to drive people crazy, but to save people from being driven crazy, and it worked". Gilman claimed that many years later, she learned that Mitchell had changed his treatment methods. However, literary historian Julie Bates Dock has discredited this. Mitchell continued his methods, and as late as 1908 – 16 years after "The Yellow Wallpaper" was published – was interested in creating entire hospitals devoted to the "rest cure" so that his treatments would be more widely accessible.

== Interpretations ==
=== Feminist interpretations ===
This story has been interpreted by feminist critics as a condemnation of the male control of the 19th-century medical profession. Throughout the short story, the narrator offers many suggestions to help her get better, such as exercising, working, or socializing with the outside world. Her ideas are dismissed immediately while using language that stereotypes her as irrational and, therefore, unqualified to offer ideas about her condition. This interpretation draws on the concept of the "domestic sphere" that women were held in during this period.

Many feminist critics focus on the degree of triumph at the end of the story. Although some claim the narrator slipped into insanity, others see the ending as a woman's assertion of agency in a marriage in which she felt trapped. The emphasis on reading and writing as sex role practices also illustrated the importance of the wallpaper. If the narrator were allowed neither to write in her journal nor to read, she would begin to "read" the wallpaper until she found the escape she was looking for. Through seeing the woman in the wallpaper, the narrator realizes that she could not live her life locked up behind bars. At the end of the story, as her husband lies on the floor unconscious, she crawls over him, symbolically rising over him. This is interpreted as a victory over her husband at the expense of her sanity.

Susan S. Lanser, a professor at Brandeis University, praises contemporary feminism and its role in changing the study and the interpretation of literature. "The Yellow Wallpaper" was one of many stories that lost authority in the literary world because of an ideology that determined the works' content to be disturbing or offensive. Critics such as the editor of the Atlantic Monthly rejected the short story because "[he] could not forgive [himself] if [he] made others as miserable as [he] made [himself]". Lanser argues that the same argument of devastation and misery can be said about the work of Edgar Allan Poe. "The Yellow Wallpaper" provided feminists the tools to interpret literature in different ways. Lanser argues that the short story was a "particularly congenial medium for such a re-vision ... because the narrator herself engages in a form of feminist interpretation when she tries to read the paper on her wall". The narrator in the story is trying to find a single meaning in the wallpaper. At first, she focuses on the contradictory style of the wallpaper: it is "flamboyant" while also "dull", "pronounced," yet "lame," and "uncertain" (p. 13). She takes into account the patterns and tries to organize them geometrically, but she is further confused. The wallpaper changes colors when it reflects light and emits a distinct odor that the protagonist cannot recognize (p. 25). At night the narrator can see a woman behind bars within the complex design of the wallpaper. Lanser argues that the unnamed woman was able to find "a space of text on which she can locate whatever self-projection". Just like the narrator as a reader, when one comes into contact with a confusing and complicated text, one tries to find a single meaning. "How we were taught to read," as Lanser puts it, is why a reader cannot fully comprehend the text. The patriarchal ideology had kept many scholars from being able to interpret and appreciate stories such as "The Yellow Wallpaper". With the growth of feminist criticism, "The Yellow Wallpaper" has become a standard text in many curricula. Feminists have made a significant contribution to the study of literature, according to Lanser, but she also remarks that if "we acknowledge the participation of women writers and readers in dominant patterns of thought and social practice then perhaps our own patterns must also be deconstructed if we are to recover meanings still hidden or overlooked."

=== Racism ===
Another interpretation technique that Lanser mentions is when the short story "is read within this discource of racial anxiety", that certain tropes in the story take on an obvious political charge.

=== Gender bias in medical diagnosis ===
Martha J. Cutter points out that many of Charlotte Perkins Gilman's works address a "struggle in which a male-dominated medical establishment attempts to silence women". Gilman's works challenge the social construction of women by a patriarchal medical discourse that forced them to be "silent, powerless, and passive". In the period in which Gilman wrote, women were frequently considered (and treated) as inferiors, prone to be sickly and weak. In this time period, it was thought that women who received formal education (amongst other causes) could develop hysteria, a now-discredited catchall term referring to most mental health diseases identified in women and erroneously believed to stem from a malfunctioning uterus (from the Greek hystera, "uterus"). At the time, the medical understanding was that women who spent time in serious intellectual pursuits (such as university education) over-stimulated their brains, which in turn led to states of hysteria. Many of the diseases diagnosed in women were considered to be a matter of a lack of self-control or self-rule. Medical practitioners argued that a physician must "assume a tone of authority" and that a "cured" woman is defined by being "subdued, docile, silent, and above all subject to the will and voice of the physician". A hysterical woman craves power. To be treated for her hysteria, she must submit to her physician, whose role is to undermine her desires. Often women were prescribed bed rest as a form of treatment, which was meant to "tame" them and keep them imprisoned. Treatments such as this were a way of ridding women of rebelliousness and forcing them to conform to expected social roles. In her works, Gilman highlights that the harm caused by these types of treatments for women, i.e., "the rest cure", has to do with how her voice is silenced. Paula Treichler explains: "In this story diagnosis 'is powerful and public. ... It is a male voice that ... imposes controls on the female narrator and dictates how she is to perceive and talk about the world.' Diagnosis covertly functions to empower the male physician's voice and disempower the female patient's." The narrator in "The Yellow Wallpaper" is not allowed to participate in her treatment or diagnosis and is completely forced to succumb to everything in which her doctor and in this particular story, her husband, says. The male voice is the one which forces control on the female and decides how she is allowed to perceive and speak about the world around her.

=== Other ===
"The Yellow Wallpaper" is sometimes cited as an example of Gothic literature for its themes of madness and powerlessness. Alan Ryan introduced the story by writing: "quite apart from its origins [it] is one of the finest, and strongest, tales of horror ever written. It may be a ghost story. Worse yet, it may not." Pioneering horror author H. P. Lovecraft writes in his essay Supernatural Horror in Literature (1927) that "'The Yellow Wall Paper' rises to a classic level in subtly delineating the madness which crawls over a woman dwelling in the hideously papered room where a madwoman was once confined".

Helen Lefkowitz Horowitz wrote that "the story was a cri de coeur against Gilman's first husband, artist Charles Walter Stetson and the traditional marriage he had demanded." Gilman attempted to deflect blame to protect her daughter Katharine and Stetson's second wife Grace Ellery Channing, who was also Gilman's close friend and cousin. Horowitz consults the sources of Charlotte's private life, including her daily journals, drafts of poems and essays, and intimate letters, and compares them to the diary accounts of her first husband. She also mines Charlotte's diaries for notes on her reading. She shows how specific poetry, fiction, and popular science shaped her consciousness and understanding of sex and gender, health and illness, emotion and intellect. Horowitz makes a case that "The Yellow Wallpaper", in its original form, did not represent a literal protest against Mitchell (a neurologist who treated Gilman in 1887) and his treatment. Rather, it emerged from Charlotte's troubled relationship with her husband Walter, personified in the story's physician. In demanding a traditional wife, Walter denied Charlotte personal freedom, squelched her intellectual energy, and characterized her illness.

In another interpretation, Sari Edelstein has argued that "The Yellow Wallpaper" is an allegory for Gilman's hatred of the emerging yellow journalism. Having created The Forerunner in November 1909, Gilman made it clear she wished the press to be more insightful and not rely upon exaggerated stories and flashy headlines. Gilman was often scandalized in the media and resented the sensationalism of the media. The relationship between the narrator and the wallpaper within the story parallels Gilman's relationship with the press. The protagonist describes the wallpaper as having "sprawling flamboyant patterns committing every artistic sin". Edelstein argues that given Gilman's distaste for the Yellow Press, this can also be seen as a description of tabloid newspapers of the day.

Paula A. Treichler focuses on the relationship portrayed in the short story between women and writing. Rather than write about the feminist themes which view the wallpaper as something along the lines of "... the 'pattern' which underlies sexual inequality, the external manifestation of neurasthenia, the narrator's unconscious, the narrator's situation within patriarchy", Treichler instead explains that the wallpaper can be a symbol to represent discourse and the fact that the narrator is alienated from the world in which she previously could somewhat express herself. Treichler illustrates that through this discussion of language and writing, in the story, Charlotte Perkins Gilman is defying the "... sentence that the structure of patriarchal language imposes". While Treichler accepts the legitimacy of strictly feminist claims, she writes that a closer look at the text suggests that the wallpaper could be interpreted as women's language and discourse. The woman found in the wallpaper could be the "... representation of women that becomes possible only after women obtain the right to speak". In making this claim, it suggests that the new struggle found within the text is between two forms of writing; one rather old and traditional, and the other new and exciting. This is supported by the fact that John, the narrator's husband, does not like his wife to write anything, which is why her journal containing the story is kept a secret and thus is known only by the narrator and reader. A look at the text shows that as the relationship between the narrator and the wallpaper grows stronger, so too does her language in her journal as she begins to increasingly write of her frustration and desperation.

=== Rest cures ===
Rest cures were a popular method of trying to cure mental disorders in the 19th century, primarily for women who were diagnosed with mental illnesses, such as "Hysteria", Melancholia, or postpartum disorders. The latter would be the condition the narrator suffers from. The most famous approach to cure this illness was being carried out by a Philadelphia neurologist called Dr. Silas Weir Mitchell, who was the doctor curing the author Charlotte Perkins Gilman as well as the narrator in her story 'The Yellow Wallpaper'. He believed to cure mental illnesses by an absolute bed rest including isolation, a fat heavy diet and daily massages, sometimes even including electrotherapy. This method didn't work as expected and resulted in profound negative physical and psychological effects, such as weight gain, chronic fatigue, increased anxiety and depression, in some cases even psychotic symptoms. The narrator's behaviour illustrates these aspects, as she rips the wallpaper apart. Approaching the 20th century, rest cures were abandoned due to the mostly negative consequences, criticism and feminist movements. Today it is a study example of sex-biased medical harm.

== Dramatic adaptations ==
=== Audio ===
- Agnes Moorehead performed a version twice, in 1948 and 1957, on the radio program Suspense.
- An adaptation of the story was broadcast as an episode of the CBC Radio drama Theatre 10:30 (1968–71). CBC Radio also presented an audio version of Mary Vingoe's adaptation for the stage at Toronto's Nightwood Theatre on Vanishing Point (1985).
- A reading of "The Yellow Wallpaper" was performed by Winifred Phillips as an episode of Tales by American Masters on National Public Radio in 1996. It was later released as an audiobook in 1998 by Durkin Hayes Audio (ISBN 978-088646895-8). This version can also be heard on Sonic Theater on XM Radio.
- BBC Radio modified and dramatized the story for the series Fear on Four, starring Anna Massey.
- YouTuber CGP Grey read "The Yellow Wallpaper" and released it on his channel on October 31, 2020.
- Actress, director Beata Pozniak performed and published "The Yellow Wallpaper" as an audiobook for the Mental Awareness Month (2021)
- Actress / singer Cynthia Erivo performed a reading for Audible Studios (2022)
- Hardy Fox created an adaptation and music for his album, "Wallpaper," in which the roles of Charlotte and her husband were reversed. It was first released on his web site and later as an album by KlangGallerie in 2023.
- Mirchi Bangla adapted "The Yellow Wallpaper" for its Friday Classic series, premiering the episode on YouTube on April 11, 2025.
- Re: Dracula adapted "The Yellow Wallpaper" and released the episode on Spotify on April 24, 2025.

=== Stage plays ===
- Nightwood Theatre in Toronto, Canada collectively adapted the story for performance in 1981.
- Heather Newman scripted and directed an adaptation of the original short story, as part of the 2003 season at Theater Schmeater, in Seattle, Washington. This adaptation won the 2003 Seattle Times "Best of the Fringe" award, and was also produced in 2005 at Tarrant County College by Dr. Judith Gallagher, and directed by Melinda Benton-Muller. In May 2010, Benton-Muller and Dr. Gallagher spoke on a panel about this adaptation at the American Literature Association, with members of the ALA and the Charlotte Perkins Gilman Society.
- Central Works of Berkeley presented a one-woman show consisting of the text of the play recited and performed by Elena Wright and with a TBA-nominated score written and performed by violinist Cybele D'Ambrosio in 2015.
- An opera by British composer Dani Howard, with libretto by Joseph Spence, was premiered in August 2023 at the Copenhagen Opera Festival.
- An opera by American composer Brooke deRosa, with libretto by Diana Farrell, premiered on January 31, 2025 at Weill Recital Hall at Carnegie Hall, presented by Lyric Opera of Orange County.

=== Film ===
- In 1989, the story was adapted as The Yellow Wallpaper by the British Broadcasting Corporation (BBC), later shown in the U.S. on Masterpiece Theatre. It was adapted by Maggie Wadey, directed by John Clive, and starred Julia Watson and Stephen Dillane.
- In 2009, the story was adapted by director John McCarty as a short (30 minute) film called Confinement starring Colleen Lovett.
- In 2011, the story was loosely adapted into the feature-length film The Yellow Wallpaper, directed by Logan Thomas, starring Aric Cushing. (DVD release, 2015)
- in 2021, K Pontuti directed a feature-length adaptation of The Yellow Wallpaper.
- In 2022, Jamie Kiernan O'Brien directed and starred in the short film The Yellow Wallpaper. In this reinterpretation, a young trans woman recovers from gender reassignment surgery in an isolated cabin while under strict observation by her boyfriend.

== See also ==
- Maria: or, The Wrongs of Woman – an unfinished novel about a woman imprisoned in an asylum
- Changeling – a film about a woman imprisoned in a mental hospital

== Bibliography ==
- Carnley, Peter (2001). The Yellow Wallpaper and other sermons HarperCollins, Sydney ISBN 1-86371-799-4
- Ford, Karen (Autumn 1985). ""The Yellow Wallpaper" and Women's Discourse". Tulsa Studies in Women's Literature. 4 (2): 309–314. doi:10.2307/463709. JSTOR 463709.
- Gilman, Charlotte Perkins (1892). The Yellow Wallpaper (1997 ed.). Dover Publications.
- Hochman, Barbara (2002). The Reading Habit and "The Yellow Wallpaper". Duke University Press.
- Johnson, Greg (Fall 1989). "Gilman's Gothic Allegory: Rage and Redemption in The Yellow Wallpaper". Studies in Short Fiction. 26 (4): 521–30.
- Ryan, Alan (1988). Haunting Women. New York: Avon Books. ISBN 978-0-380-89881-7.
- Thomas, Deborah. "The Changing Role of Womanhood: From True Woman to New Woman in Charlotte Perkins Gilman's "The Yellow Wallpaper"". Archived from the original on October 3, 2012.
- Thrailkill, Jane F. (Summer 2002). "Doctoring "The Yellow Wallpaper"". ELH. 69 (2): 525–566. doi:10.1353/elh.2002.0019. JSTOR 30032030. S2CID 162202662.
- Treichler, Paula A. (1984). "Escaping the Sentence: Diagnosis and Discourse in 'The Yellow Wallpaper'". Tulsa Studies in Women's Literature. pp. 61–75. JSTOR 463825.
- Estok, Simon C. (2023), "Pulped and Reduced, Dried Out and Flattened: The Horrors of Aborted Agency in 'The Yellow Wallpaper.", Studies in American Fiction, 50 (1), EBSCOhost: 75–96, doi:10.1353/saf.2023.a923095
- Rajasmita, Singha (August 11, 2024), Between Madness and Sanity: Examining Suicide Ideation in the Female Characters in 'The Yellow Wallpaper' and The Bell Jar., vol. 4, EBSCOhost, pp. 16–30
