= Daniel Silvestri =

American racing driver

- Born: November 12, 2002 (age 23) Great Falls, Virginia, U.S.

CARS Late Model Stock Tour career
- Debut season: 2021
- Years active: 2021–2022, 2025–present
- Starts: 14
- Championships: 0
- Wins: 1
- Poles: 0
- Best finish: 12th in 2021
- Statistics up to date as of October 7, 2025.

Daniel Silvestri (born November 12, 2002) is an American professional stock car racing driver. He last competed in the zMAX CARS Tour, driving the No. 17 for Tom Usry Racing, and the No. 15 for Logan Clark Racing.

On June 19, 2021, Silvestri scored his only career CARS Tour win at Dominion Raceway.

Silvestri is a former student at Virginia Tech Pamplin College of Business.

Silvestri has also competed in the Virginia Late Model Triple Crown Series, the Apex Racing Lab Bull Bash Winter Series, the INEX Winter Heat Series, and the NASCAR Weekly Series.

== Motorsports results ==
=== CARS Late Model Stock Car Tour ===
(key) (Bold – Pole position awarded by qualifying time. Italics – Pole position earned by points standings or practice time. * – Most laps led. ** – All laps led.)

CARS Late Model Stock Car Tour results
Year	Team	No.	Make	1	2	3	4	5	6	7	8	9	10	11	12	13	14	15	CLMSCTC	Pts	Ref
2021	Brian Silvestri	97	Chevy	DIL; 16	HCY; 5	OCS; 12	ACE; 13	CRW; 11	LGY; 9	DOM; 1*	HCY; 24	MMS; 10	TCM	FLC	WKS	SBO; 2			12th	230	
2022	Brian Silvestri	97	Chevy	CRW	HCY	GRE	AAS	FCS	LGY	DOM	HCY; 10	ACE	MMS	NWS	TCM	ACE	SBO; 16	CRW	40th	40	
2025	Tom Usry Racing	17	Ford	AAS	WCS	CDL	OCS	ACE	NWS; 36	LGY									52nd	41	
2025	Logan Clark Racing	15S	N/A								DOM; 7	CRW	HCY	AND	FLC	SBO	TCM	NWS	52nd	41	
