= There's No Such Thing as Vampires =

- Directed by: Logan Thomas
- Written by: Aric Cushing; Logan Thomas
- Produced by: Aric Cushing; Andrea Kaufman; Raven Dia Saul; Logan Thomas
- Starring: Emma Holzer; Josh Plasse; Aric Cushing
- Music by: Logan Thomas
- Release date: August 28, 2020 (FrightFest)
- Running time: 80 minutes
- Country: United States
- Language: English

There's No Such Thing as Vampires is a 2020 horror film that was directed by Logan Thomas. It is based on a script written by Thomas and Aric Cushing, who also starred.

The film premiered in the United Kingdom and United States in August 2020 at the film festivals FrightFest and Dances With Films, respectively, prior to its release in 2021.

== Synopsis ==
Joshua interrupts a showing of Nosferatu in order to warn the viewers that vampires are very real, only to be taunted by a cowled figure, Maximilian. With Maximilian in pursuit, Joshua flees to the desert and gets involved in a motor vehicle collision with Ariel. The two flee after Ariel experiences a vision of her dead mother. They head to a friend of Ariel's, David, in hopes that he can help them evade potential harm and death.

== Cast ==
- Emma Holzer as Ariel
- Josh Plasse as Joshua
- Aric Cushing as Maximilian Maddox
- Meg Foster as Sister Frank
- Raphael Sbarge as Detective Warren
- Will Haden as David
- Judy Tenuta as Barbecue Becky
- Scott Lindley as Peter
- Brian Huckeba as Jojo
- Maria Olsen as Sigfreda
- Chiquita Fuller as Detective Lowery
- Tom McLaren as Detective Sykes
- James Adam Tucker as Officer Davis
- Matthew Dennis Lewis as Cameron

== Production ==
Director Logan Thomas worked with American actor and writer Aric Cushing to pen the film's script. The two had previously worked together on the 2011 film The Yellow Wallpaper and Thomas did not want to make a similar film for his follow up. Cushing suggested several plots, all of which Thomas declined until Cushing suggested one about "a couple of people being out in the desert, basically being stalked in the desert by a Nosferatu or possible vampire". Thomas wanted the film to be a road movie and to "add something new to the vampire myth", so he wanted to "combine the other stuff that I would rather do, something closer to the original Mad Max or Terminator, and bring that idea and level of myth to it." Other inspirations for the film came from the film Fright Night and 80s horror films in general.

Casting for the movie took about six to ten weeks and principal photography for There's No Such Thing as Vampires wrapped in 2017.

== Release ==
There's No Such Thing as Vampires had its United Kingdom premiere at the August 2020 digital edition of FrightFest on August 28, 2020, followed by its North American premiere at Dances With Films on August 29, 2020. The film had a reduced number of screenings at other film festivals due to multiple festivals cancelling that year's events due to the COVID-19 pandemic.

== Reception ==
There's No Such Thing as Vampires holds a rating of 75% at review aggregator Rotten Tomatoes, based on eight reviews, with an average rating of 5.7/10.

== Sequel ==
Thomas has expressed interest in continuing the film via a sequel or a soft reboot miniseries via a streaming provider such as Netflix.
