= Mike Looney =

American racing driver

- Born: April 7, 1978 (age 48) New Castle, Virginia, U.S.

CARS Late Model Stock Tour career
- Debut season: 2020
- Years active: 2020–2023
- Starts: 19
- Championships: 0
- Wins: 0
- Poles: 4
- Best finish: 16th in 2021
- Statistics up to date as of October 21, 2025.

Mike Looney (born April 7, 1978) is an American professional stock car racing driver who previously competed in the CARS Tour from 2020 to 2023.

Looney has also competed in the Virginia Late Model Triple Crown Series, the Dirty Dozen Series, and the NASCAR Weekly Series, and is a former winner of the ValleyStar Credit Union 300, having won it in 2016.

== Motorsports results ==
=== CARS Late Model Stock Car Tour ===
(key) (Bold – Pole position awarded by qualifying time. Italics – Pole position earned by points standings or practice time. * – Most laps led. ** – All laps led.)

CARS Late Model Stock Car Tour results
Year	Team	No.	Make	1	2	3	4	5	6	7	8	9	10	11	12	13	14	15	16	CLMSCTC	Pts	Ref
2020	Billy Martin Racing	87	Chevy	SNM	ACE	HCY	HCY	DOM	**FCS**; 2*	LGY	CCS	FLO								26th	57	
2020	Billy Martin Racing	87	Ford										GRE; 11							26th	57	
2021	Billy Martin Racing	87	Chevy	DIL; 7	HCY; 13	OCS; 19	ACE	**CRW**; 20	LGY	**DOM**; 2	HCY; 16	MMS; 3	TCM; 8	FLC	WKS	SBO; 15				16th	201	
2022	Billy Martin Racing	87	Chevy	CRW; 25	HCY; 25	GRE; 28	AAS	**FCS**; 18	LGY	DOM	HCY	ACE	MMS; 3	NWS; 29	TCM; 22	ACE	SBO	CRW		24th	82	
2023	Nelson Motorsports	12	Chevy	SNM	FLC	HCY	ACE	NWS	LGY	DOM; 23	CRW	HCY	ACE	TCM	WKS	AAS	SBO	TCM	CRW	75th	10	

=== IHRA Late Model Sportsman Series ===
(key) (Bold – Pole position awarded by qualifying time. Italics – Pole position earned by points standings or practice time. * – Most laps led. ** – All laps led.)

IHRA Late Model Sportsman Series
Year	Team	No.	Make	1	2	3	ISCSS	Pts	Ref
2026	Billy Martin Racing	87	Chevy	DUB; 8	CDL	AND	N/A	0	
