= Coy Beard =

American racing driver

- Born: October 4, 1985 (age 41) Lexington, North Carolina, U.S.

CARS Late Model Stock Tour career
- Debut season: 2021
- Years active: 2021–2023
- Starts: 3
- Championships: 0
- Wins: 0
- Poles: 0
- Best finish: 49th in 2021
- Statistics up to date as of October 10, 2026.

Coy Beard (born October 4, 1985) is an American professional stock car racing driver who competed in the zMAX CARS Tour from 2021 to 2023.

Beard has also competed in series such as the Mid-Atlantic Limited Late Model Series, the IHRA Stock Car Series, the 602 Super Limited Series, and the NASCAR Weekly Series, and is a frequent competitor at Caraway Speedway, where he is a former champion in the Late Model division.

== Motorsports results ==
=== CARS Late Model Stock Car Tour ===
(key) (Bold – Pole position awarded by qualifying time. Italics – Pole position earned by points standings or practice time. * – Most laps led. ** – All laps led.)

CARS Late Model Stock Car Tour results
| Year | Team | No. | Make | 1 | 2 | 3 | 4 | 5 | 6 | 7 | 8 | 9 | 10 | 11 | 12 | 13 | 14 | 15 | 16 | CLMSCTC | Pts | Ref |
|---|---|---|---|---|---|---|---|---|---|---|---|---|---|---|---|---|---|---|---|---|---|---|
| 2021 | Butch Hayworth | 27 | Chevy | DIL | HCY | OCS | ACE | CRW; 15 | LGY | DOM | HCY | MMS | TCM | FLC | WKS | SBO | | | | 49th | 18 | |
| 2022 | Grey Hayworth | 27 | Chevy | CRW; 24 | HCY | GRE | AAS | FCS | LGY | DOM | HCY | ACE | MMS | NWS | TCM | ACE | SBO | CRW | | 72nd | 9 | |
| 2023 | N/A | 75 | Chevy | SNM | FLC | HCY | ACE | NWS | LGY | DOM | CRW | HCY | ACE | TCM | WKS | AAS | SBO | TCM | CRW; 15 | 60th | 18 | |

=== IHRA Late Model Sportsman Series ===
(key) (Bold – Pole position awarded by qualifying time. Italics – Pole position earned by points standings or practice time. * – Most laps led. ** – All laps led.)

IHRA Late Model Sportsman Series
| Year | Team | No. | Make | 1 | 2 | 3 | ISCSS | Pts | Ref |
|---|---|---|---|---|---|---|---|---|---|
| 2026 | N/A | 75 | Chevy | DUB; 2 | CDL; 10 | AND; 11 | 4th | 121 | |
