= Andrew Grady =

American racing driver

- Born: 1994 or 1995 (age 31–32) Kinston, North Carolina, U.S.

CARS Late Model Stock Tour career
- Debut season: 2021
- Years active: 2021–present
- Starts: 52
- Championships: 0
- Wins: 0
- Poles: 0
- Best finish: 14th in 2024
- Statistics up to date as of October 19, 2025.

Andrew Grady (born 1994 or 1995) is an American professional stock car racing driver. He last competed in the zMAX CARS Tour, driving the No. 1 Chevrolet for TG Motorsports. He is the son of fellow racing driver Tony Grady, who has previously competed in late-model competition.

In 2022, Grady was involved in an incident following a qualifying heat race for the Virginia Late Model Triple Crown Series event at Martinsville Speedway, where Davey Callihan made contact with him whilst fighting for a transfer spot late in the race. Following the race, Grady would run over to Callihan's car, where he would proceed to punch Callihan while he was still sitting in his car. Grady would then proceed to kick Callihan's car as he was carried away by a staff member. Grady would later go on to claim that Callihan had been giving him obscene gestures as he was walking over to the latters car, although Callihan denied this claim, and that Callihan "had no business driving a late-model, let alone a lawn mower". Grady would fail to qualify for the event while Callihan would go on to finish 22nd in the main event.

During the 2024 CARS Tour season, Grady was given a three-race suspension and a 1000 USD fine following the event at Hickory Motor Speedway in July of that year for assaulting or threatening to cause bodily harm to a CARS Tour official (the official in this case was series founder Jack McNelly), and an additional 500 USD for unauthorized crossing of the racing surface to confront another competitor, after being involved in an incident with Landon Huffman, in which he threw his HANS device at Huffman's car. Grady later claimed in a statement following his suspension that McNelly made contact with Grady's mother, which left her with bruises, and that McNelly had also attempted to choke him, which led to crew members from Chad Bryant Racing to become involved.

Grady has also competed in the NASCAR Weekly Series, the Southeast Limited Late Model Series Challenger Division and the Paramount Kia Big 10 Challenge.

== Motorsports results ==
=== CARS Late Model Stock Car Tour ===
(key) (Bold – Pole position awarded by qualifying time. Italics – Pole position earned by points standings or practice time. * – Most laps led. ** – All laps led.)

CARS Late Model Stock Car Tour results
Year	Team	No.	Make	1	2	3	4	5	6	7	8	9	10	11	12	13	14	15	16	17	CLMSCTC	Pts	Ref
2021	TG Motorsports	1G	Chevy	DIL	HCY	OCS	ACE	CRW	LGY	DOM	HCY	MMS	TCM	FLC	WKS; 9	SBO					40th	24	
2022	Mike Darne Racing	1	Chevy	CRW; 19	HCY; 9	GPS; 23	AAS; 18		LGY; 13	DOM; 19	HCY; 22	ACE; 20		NWS; 17	TCM; 16	ACE	SBO; 26	CRW; 12			15th	223	
2022	Mike Darne Racing	91	Chevy					FCS; 14													15th	223	
2022	Mike Darne Racing	91	Toyota										MMS; 15								15th	223	
2023	TG Motorsports	1	Chevy	SNM; 13	FLC; 22	HCY; 16	ACE; DNQ	NWS; 37	LGY; 14	DOM; 18	CRW; 10		ACE; 10	TCM; 17	WKS; 18	AAS; 15	SBO; 16	TCM; 24	CRW; 16		16th	235	
2023	TG Motorsports	5	Chevy									HCY; 22									16th	235	
2024	TG Motorsports	1	Chevy	SNM; 27	HCY; 25	AAS; 9	OCS; 12	ACE; 19	TCM; 4	LGY; 12	DOM; 10	CRW; 13	HCY; 23	NWS	ACE	WCS	FLC; 25	SBO; 14	TCM; 9	NWS; 25	14th	235	
2025	TG Motorsports	1	Chevy	AAS; 17	WCS; 25	CDL	OCS; 13	ACE; 19	NWS; 13	LGY; 22	DOM	CRW; 17	HCY	AND	FLC	SBO	TCM	NWS; 17			22nd	193	
