= Logan Russell =

Bahamian footballer (born 1999)

Personal information
- Date of birth: 26 October 1999 (age 27)
- Height: 1.88 m (6 ft 2 in)
- Position: Defender

College career
Years	Team	Apps	(Gls)
2018–2019	Bowdoin Athletics	5	(0)
2020–2023	Wheaton Thunder	9	(0)

International career^{‡}
	Bahamas U15	4	
	Bahamas U17	5	
2019–2023	Bahamas	16	(0)
- ‡ National team caps and goals as of 17 February 2025

Logan Russell (born 26 October 1999) is a retired Bahamian footballer who played as a defender and midfielder for the Bahamas national team. Logan was a Bible and Theology major at Wheaton College (Il) graduating in May 2023. Logan then attended Harvard University where he received his Master's in Education completing his degree in May 2024.

== Career statistics ==
=== International ===
As of match played 30 March 2021.

National team	Year	Apps	Goals
Bahamas	2019	4	0
Bahamas	2021	5	0
Bahamas	2022	7	0
Total		16	0
