= Aric Cushing =

American actor & writer (born 1973)

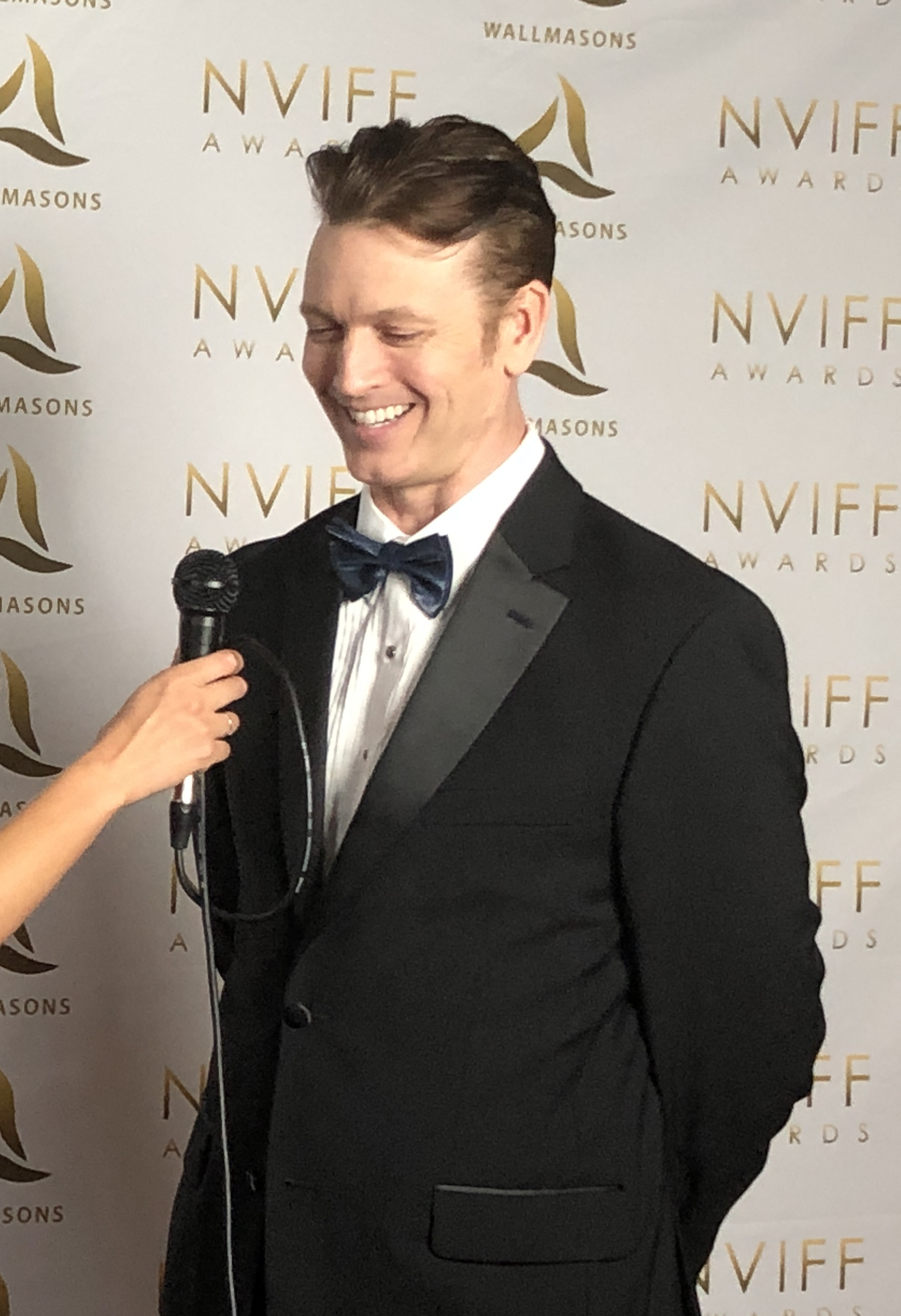
- Aric Cushing. Amsterdam. 2019
- Born: September 26, 1973 (age 53); California, U.S
- Occupations: Actor, writer
- Years active: 1992–present

Aric Cushing (born September 26, 1973) is an American actor and writer. He is the co-founder of the Los Angeles Fear and Fantasy Film Festival.

== Early life and career ==
A native of California, Aric grew up in the town of Boulder Creek. As a child he performed in numerous local productions such as This One Thing I Do, a feminist play about Elizabeth Cady Stanton and Susan B. Anthony, Girl Crazy, The Diary of Anne Frank, and Arsenic and Old Lace, and at 12 years old in A Chorus Line. For his performance in Hats Off: A Tribute to Broadway Musicals in 1986, at 13 years old, he told the Valley Press, "I'm excited. I can't wait to get back out there." A recipient of numerous speech awards, he received a college grant from Hewlett-Packard, attended both the American Conservatory Theater in San Francisco and the London Court Theater in England, and afterwards toured the Pacific Northwest in a 2-person travelling theater company. Upon moving to Hollywood, he worked at a talent agency before producing and starring in the film Broken and Bleeding, later renamed Shot to the Heart. In 2019, he won Best Actor at the Prison City Film Festival in Huntsville, Texas for his role in Shot to the Heart. After producing and starring in The Yellow Wallpaper feature film, he appeared in America's Most Wanted, Renegade, and a variety of other TV shows and music videos. In 2016, his middle grade book Vampire Boy was published, and won the Readers' View award, the Purple Dragonfly Award, a Pinnacle Award, first place for the Gertrude Lawrence Middle Grade Reader Award, and a Reader's Favorite medal. Also in 2020, he starred in There's No Such Thing as Vampires and in 2021 received a Best Supporting Actor Nomination at the FilmQuest Film Festival for his portrayal of the lead villain.

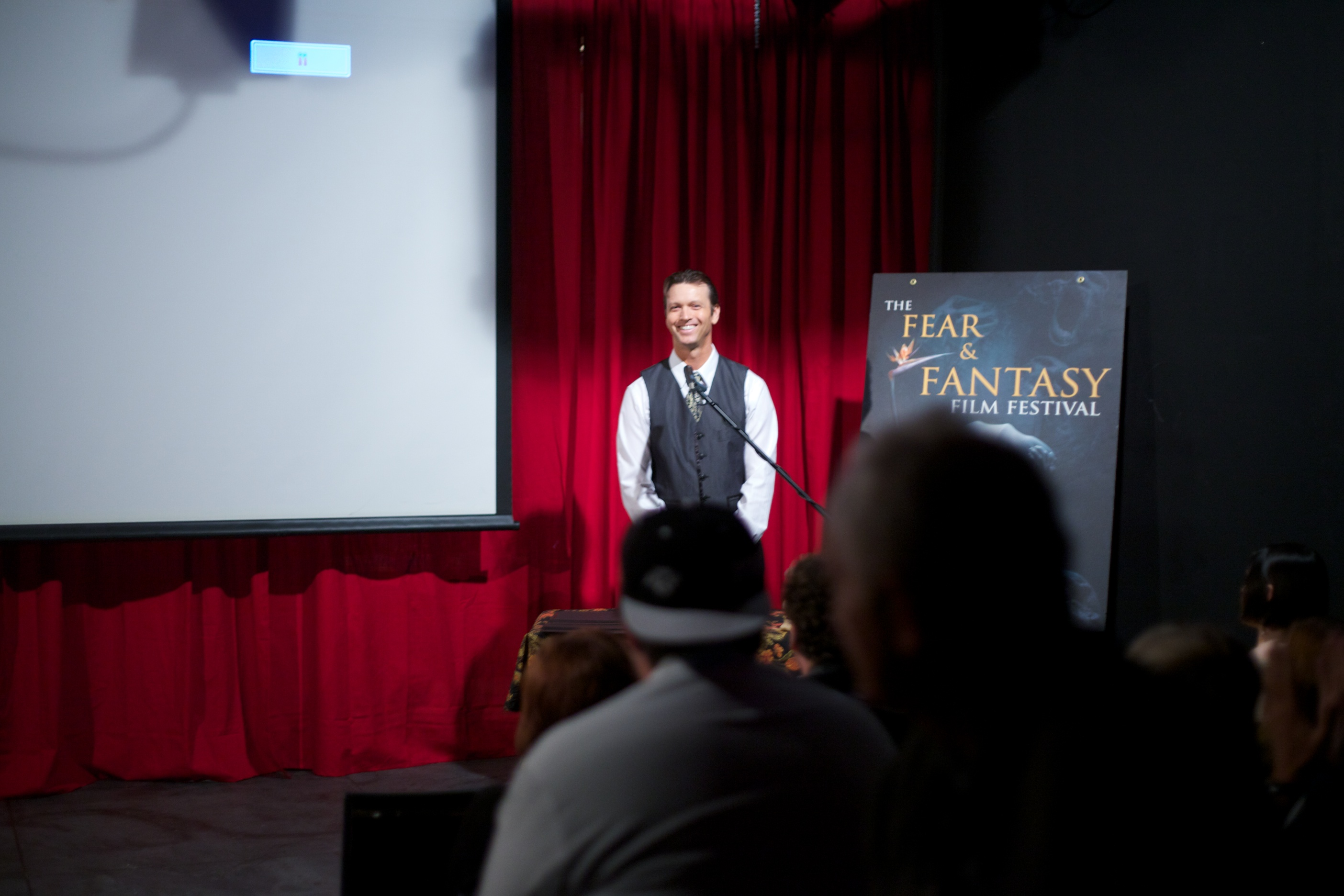
Aric Cushing at The LA Fear and Fantasy Film Festival

== The Fear and Fantasy Film Festival ==
The co-founder of the Los Angeles Fear and Fantasy Film Festival. The festival began in 2012 and was established by director Logan Thomas and Aric Cushing. Festival awards include Best Actor, Best Picture, Best Actress, and others, as well as a screenwriting competition. The festival was first held in Burbank, California. The festival also released a Horror Shorts Vol. 1 DVD with selections from the festival of fear and fantasy short films from around the world.

== Aric Cushing and Charlotte Perkins Gilman ==
Aric Cushing's relationship to Charlotte Perkins Gilman is varied. Gilman's most famous story, "The Yellow Wallpaper" has been adapted numerous times for stage and screen, including in 2011 by Cushing himself. The Yellow Wallpaper feature film (ISBN 978-0615-769639) was directed by Logan Thomas.

He also wrote a corresponding collection of Charlotte Perkins Gilman's work, titled "The Yellow Wallpaper and Other Stories: The Complete Gothic Collection" (ISBN 978-0-615-56839-3). "Aric Cushing's introductory essay 'Is the Yellow-Wallpaper a Gothic story?' nails the subject; especially since the original feminist take on Gilman's works often skated over the Gothic feel of her works to focus on underlying feminist interpretations alone." Previously, Charlotte Perkins Gilman's work as a novelist, short story writer, poet, and public speaker was mostly regarded from the feminist viewpoint, especially when her feminist work was used as a platform in the 1960s feminist movement. The introduction contends that before Gilman launched into her socialist themes, and during the time she wrote 'The Yellow Wall-paper" story, she focused on Gothic stories for a short period of time (mostly between 1890 and 1895). The story is sometimes polarized between people who believe it to be only a Gothic story and those that only believe it to be a women's rights tale. Aric Cushing is the first to discover two previously 'lost' works that surrounded her short and brief period writing Gothic and ghost fiction, which are included in the compilation, and were never re-published after their original publication dates in the 1890s. The stories are "The Unwatched Door" and "Clifford's Tower". In 2014, Aric edited and published "Lost Essays" (ISBN 978-1-929-73000-1), a collection of Gilman's commentaries.

== Filmography ==
- 2021: There's No Such Thing as Vampires as Maximilian Maddox.
- 2020: The Dragonfly Conspiracy as Dr. McGinnis.
- 2019: The Premonition as The Grim Reaper.
- 2018: Shot to the Heart (as Edward) (Winner Best Actor at the Prison City Film Festival)
- 2013: Horror Shorts: Volume 1 (Actor and produced by)
- 2012: The Yellow Wallpaper (also produced and written by) Plays character Dr. John Weiland.
- 2011: American Horror Story (as Junkie)(1 episode).
- 2011: Indie Friendlie (Interview: as Self).
- 2011: The Witness as Simon.
- 2009: The Wave: 3D as Producer.
- 2008: Hotel Caesar (TV Series) (5 episodes) as Robert Toril.
- 2005: The Dying Gaul as Jeffrey Bishop.
- 2003: Unreal unknown.
- 2002: Tender Dracula (Re-release Producer).
- 2002: Toxic Zombies (Re-release Producer).
- 2001: History's Mysteries (1 episode) Looter
- 1998: Broken and Bleeding (also co-directed by) as Eddie Tartarus.
- 1998: Some Prefer Cake (special thanks)
- 1997: Jack as Officer Stevens.
- 1996: "Come and Get Your Love" (Real McCoy video) Actor.
- 1995: Renegade (TV Series) as Grocery Boy David.
- 1995: Sawyer Brown (Video) Actor.
- 1994: America's Most Wanted (TV Series) as Tad Mason.
- 1994: Speed: Billy Idol (TV Short) Actor.
- 1993: The Lisa Theory (Directed by Academy Award-winning director Steven Okazaki) as Mark.
- 1993: Tales of the City (Mini-Series) as Christmas Reveller.
- 1993: And the Band Played On (HBO TV Movie) as Street Walker.
- 1992: Sincerely Yours (Pilot) as David.
- 1992: Sister Act as Student.

== Bibliography ==
- 2020: Don't Turn Out the Lights: A Tribute to Alvin Schwartz's Scary Stories to Tell in the Dark (contributor). Random House. ISBN 978-0-06-287767-3
- 2016: Vampire Boy (Novel) ISBN 978-1-929730-04-9
- 2015: Mirrored Voices: Best New Poets (Contributor) ISBN 978-1507710715
- 2015: Mirrored Voices: Emerging Poets Anthology (Contributor) ISBN 978-1507710715
- 2014: Lost Essays (Compiler, Editor) ISBN 978-1929730001
- 2013: The Yellow Wallpaper (Screenplay) ISBN 978-0615-769639
- 2012: The Yellow Wallpaper and Other Stories: The Complete Gothic Collection ISBN 978-0-615-56839-3
- 2011: Dracula: A Play in 2 Acts ISBN 978-1-4663-8685-3
- 1998: Broken and Bleeding (Screenplay)

== Stagework ==
- 2011: The Solid Gold Cadillac (Sierra Madre)
- 2008: Of All Places (Los Angeles)
- 2005: Dracula (Los Angeles Premiere)
- 2001: The Sum of Us (Los Angeles) (Robby Nomination: Best Supporting Actor)
- 1995: The Taming of the Shrew (Pasadena)
- 1993: Mollie and Roberto (Mill Valley)
- 1992: One of These Days (San Francisco)
- 1992: Robin Hood (Pacific Northwest Tour)
- 1992: Robert Louis Stevenson's '''Kidnapped''' (Pacific Northwest Tour)
- 1991: Elevate... Or? (San Francisco)
- 1991: Hitchhiker's Guide to the Galaxy (Menlo Park)
- 1988: A Thurber Carnival
- 1986: This One Thing I Do (Ben Lomond)
- 1986: Hats Off: A Tribute to Broadway Musicals
- 1985: A Chorus Line (Santa Cruz)
- 1984: Diary of Anne Frank (Ben Lomond)
