= Tulsa Studies in Women's Literature =

- Discipline: Literature
- Language: English
- Edited by: Jennifer L. Airey

Publication details
- History: 1982 to present
- Publisher: University of Tulsa (United States)

Standard abbreviations
- ISO 4: Tulsa Stud. Women's Lit.

Indexing
- ISSN: 0732-7730 (print); 1936-1645 (web)

Links
- Journal homepage

Tulsa Studies in Women's Literature (TSWL), founded by Germaine Greer in 1982, is devoted to the study of women's literature and women's writing in general. Publishing "articles, notes, research, and reviews of literary, historicist, and theoretical work by established and emerging scholars in the field of women's literature and feminist theory", it has been described as the "longest-running academic journal focusing exclusively on women's writing".

== About ==
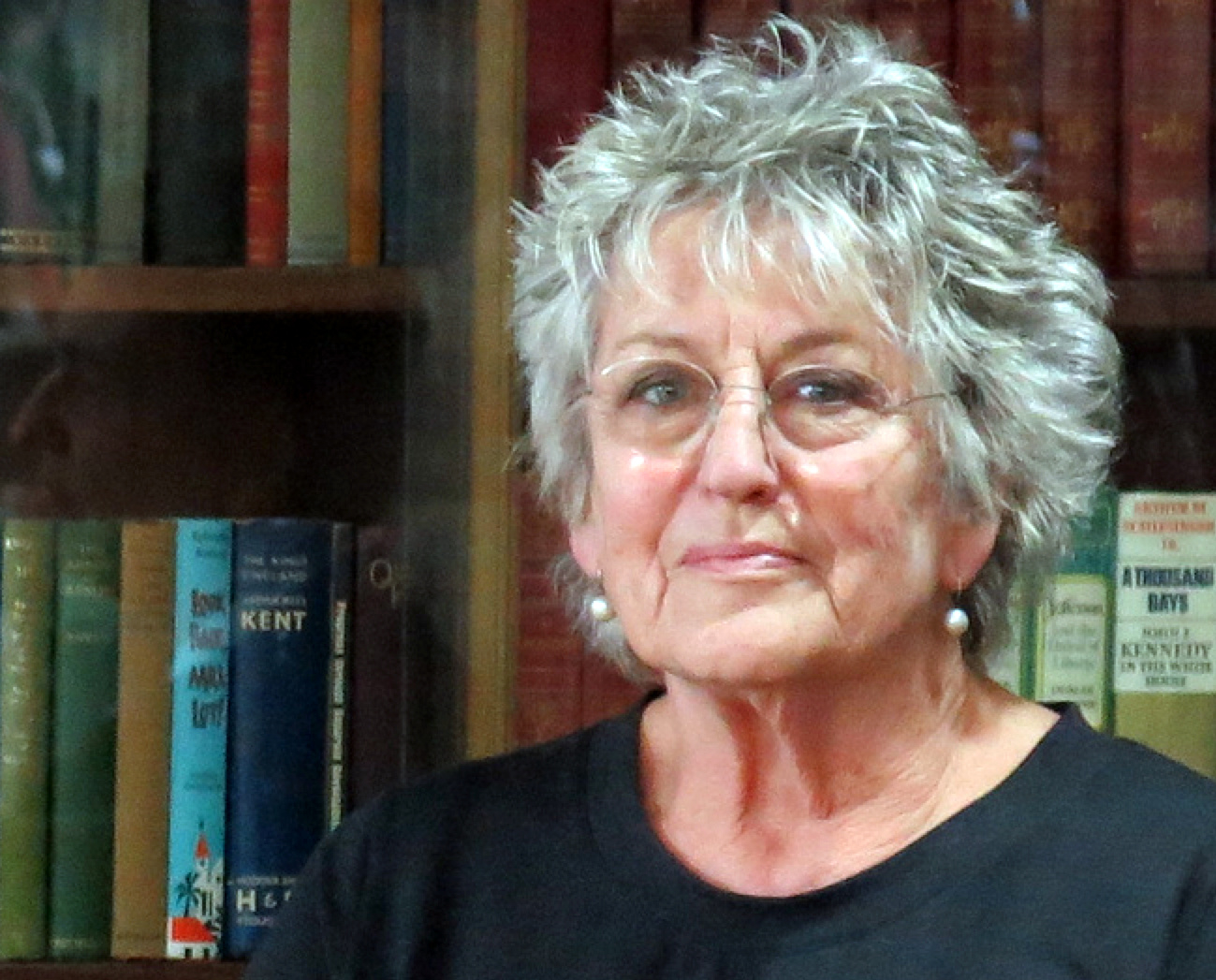
TSWL founding editor Germaine Greer

As part of the now-defunct Tulsa Center for the Study of Women's Literature, the journal was founded in 1982 by Germaine Greer while she was teaching at the University of Tulsa. Greer's purpose for the journal was to begin "the rehabilitation of women's literary history". Following her tenure, Shari Benstock (1983–1986), Mary O’Toole (1986–1988), Holly Laird (1988–2005), and Laura Stevens (2005-2016) each served as the journal's editor. Jennifer Airey became the editor in 2016.

The distinctive TSWL logo, present from the journal's inaugural issue, is a saxifrage flower, captioned with a quotation from William Turner's Herbal: "The white saxifrage with the indented leafe is moste commended for the breakinge of the stone."

The journal's editorial and advisory boards include scholars prominent in their fields. Board members include Nina Auerbach, Marilyn Butler, Carol T. Christ, Helen Cooper, Sandra M. Gilbert, Susan Gubar, Peggy Kamuf, and Jane Marcus.

== Content ==
Fall

TSWL Covers

In addition to articles, notes, research, and reviews, Tulsa Studies in Women's Literature has published numerous forums and special issues during its twenty-eight-year run:

- The Silver Jubilee Issue: What We Have Done & Where We Are Going, Vol. 26. No. 1 (Spring 2007)
- Emotions, Vol. 25, No. 1 (Spring 2006)
- The Feminist Legacy of Carolyn Heilbrun, Vol. 24, No. 2 (Fall 2005)
- Where in the World is Transnational Feminism? Vol. 23, No. 1 (Spring 2004)
- The Adoption Issue, Vol. 21, No. 2 (Fall 2002)
- Feminism and Time, Vol. 21, No. 1 (Spring 2002)
- Women Writing Across the World, Vol. 20, No. 2 (Fall 2001)
- Problems of Beauty in Feminist Studies, Vol. 19, No. 2 (Fall 2000)
- Political Discourse/British Women's Writing, 1640–1867, Vol. 17, No. 2 (Fall 1998)
- After Empire II, Vol. 15, No. 2 (Fall 1996)
- After Empire I, Vol. 15, No. 1 (Spring 1996)
- On Collaborations II, Vol. 14, No. 1 (Spring 1995)
- On Collaborations I, Vol. 13, No. 2 (Fall 1994)
- Is There an Anglo-American Feminist Criticism? Vol. 12, No. 2 (Fall 1993)
- South African Women Writing, Vol. 11, No. 1 (Spring 1992)
- Redefining Marginality, Vol. 10, No. 1 (Spring 1991)
- Women Writing Autobiography, Vol. 9, No. 1 (Spring 1990)
- Towards a Gendered Modernity, Vol. 8, No. 1 (Spring 1989)
- Woman and Nation, Vol. 6, No. 2 (Fall 1987)
- Feminist Issues in Literary Scholarship, Vol. 3, Nos. 1/2 (Spring/Fall 1984)

The journal has developed two new features over its history: the Archives and Innovations sections. The Archives section, instituted in 1986, "is devoted to the transmission and discussion of the findings of archival research and its theory and practice." The Innovations section presents new approaches to the study of women writers.

== Awards ==
The journal has been recognized several times by the Council of Editors of Learned Journals. Two issues of TSWL have won the Best Special Issue Award: "Feminist Issues in Literary Scholarship" (1984), edited by Shari Benstock, and "Redefining Marginality" (1991), edited by Holly Laird. "Toward a Gendered Modernity" (1988), edited by Holly Laird, was also a finalist for the Best Special Issue Award. In 2007 Holly Laird received the Distinguished Editor Award.
