= Logan Evans =

Logan Evans may refer to:

- Logan Evans (baseball) (born 2001), American baseball pitcher
- Logan Evans (footballer) (born 2005), Australian rules footballer
