= Logan Richardson (boxer) =

English boxer (born 2000)

Personal information
- Nationality: English
- Born: 11 July 2000 (age 26)
- Weight: Bantamweight

Boxing career

Boxing record
- Total fights: 7
- Wins: 6
- Win by KO: 2
- Losses: 1

Logan Richardson (born 11 July 2000) is an English professional boxer. He held the English bantamweight title in 2025.

== Career ==
Having taken up boxing aged 13 and turned professional in 2022, Richardson claimed his first pro-title when he dethroned previously unbeaten Central Area bantamweight champion Jake Harrison by fifth round stoppage at Grand Central Hall in Liverpool on 23 March 2024.

Just over a year later, on 29 March 2025, he won the English bantamweight title by stopping undefeated defending champion Lewis Roberts in the seventh round at the GL1 Leisure Centre in Gloucester.

== Personal life ==
Away from boxing, Richardson works as a joiner.

== Professional boxing record ==
6 fights	5 wins	1 loss
By knockout	2	0
By decision	3	1

No.	Result	Record	Opponent	Type	Round, time	Date	Location	Notes
7	Loss	6–1	Joshua John	UD	10	14 Jun 2025	The Galleries, Gloucester, England	
6	Win	6–0	Lewis Roberts	TKO	7 (10), 2:15	29 Mar 2025	GL1 Leisure Centre, Gloucester, England	Won English bantamweight title
5	Win	5–0	Jake Harrison	TKO	5 (10), 0:20	23 Mar 2024	Grand Central Hall, Liverpool, England	Won Central Area bantamweight title
4	Win	4–0	Nabil Ahmed	PTS	4	4 Nov 2023	City Hall, Hull, England	
3	Win	3–0	Mikey Young	PTS	6	15 Apr 2023	City Hall, Hull, England	
2	Win	2–0	Kiernan McAfee	PTS	4	2 Jul 2022	City Hall, Hull, England	
1	Win	1–0	Jake Pollard	PTS	4	20 Mar 2022	City Hall, Hull, England	
