= Logan Martin =

Logan Martin may refer to:

- Logan Martin (BMX rider) (born 1993), Australian BMX rider
- Logan Martin (footballer) (born 1997), French footballer
- Logan Martin Lake, a reservoir located in Alabama
