= Logan Campbell =

Logan Campbell may refer to:

- Sir John Logan Campbell (1817–1912), New Zealand public figure
- Logan Campbell (rugby league) (born 1971), New Zealand rugby league footballer
- Logan Campbell (taekwondo) (born 1986), New Zealand taekwondo practitioner
- Logan Campbell (sailor) (born 1987), Canadian Paralympic sailor

== See also ==
- Campbell Logan (1910–1978), British television producer
