= Logan Allen =

Logan Allen may refer to:

- Logan Allen (baseball, born 1997), Canadian and American pitcher for the NC Dinos
- Logan Allen (baseball, born 1998), Panamanian and American pitcher for the Cleveland Guardians
- Logan Allen (actor) (born 2004), American actor, writer and director
