= Logan Cunningham =

Logan Cunningham may refer to:

- Logan Cunningham (coach) (1887–1964), American football coach
- Logan Cunningham (pole vaulter) (born 1991), American pole vaulter
- Logan Cunningham (actor), American actor known for his work in the video game industry
