= Logan Mitchell =

Logan Mitchell may refer to:

- Logan Mitchell (Big Time Rush)
- Logan Mitchell (freethinker) (1802–1881), British freethinker and writer
