= Logan Long =

American politician (1878–1933)

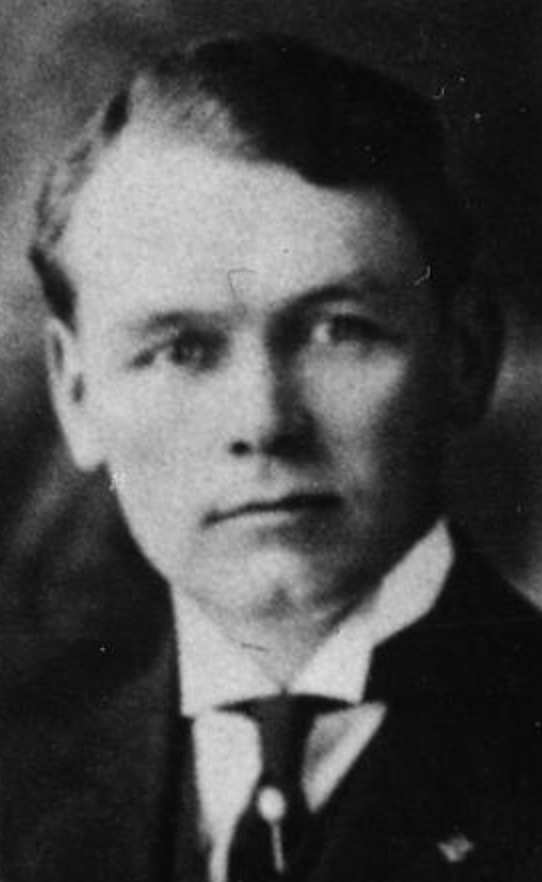
- Long in 1919

Member of the Washington House of Representatives for the 14th district
- In office 1915–1927

Personal details
- Born: September 28, 1878 Pennsylvania, United States
- Died: September 30, 1933 (aged 55) Seattle, Washington, United States
- Party: Republican

Logan Lee Long (September 28, 1878 – September 30, 1933) was an American politician in the state of Washington. He served in the Washington House of Representatives from 1915 to 1927. He died in an accident in 1933.
