= Logan Clark (racing driver) =

American racing driver

- Born: 2003 or 2004 (age 22–23) Mechanicsville, Virginia, U.S.

CARS Late Model Stock Tour career
- Debut season: 2023
- Years active: 2023–present
- Starts: 14
- Championships: 0
- Wins: 0
- Poles: 0
- Best finish: 23rd in 2023
- Statistics up to date as of November 24, 2025.

Logan Clark (born 2003 or 2004) is an American professional stock car racing driver and team owner. He has previously competed in the CARS Tour from 2023 to 2024.

Clark is the owner of Logan Clark Racing, a team that competes in late-model competition.

Clark has also competed in series such as the Virginia Late Model Triple Crown Series, the CRA Street Stocks Series, the INEX Summer Shootout Series, and the NASCAR Weekly Series.

Outside of racing, Clark works as a licensed realtor at The Hogan Group in Richmond, Virginia.

== Motorsports results ==
=== CARS Late Model Stock Car Tour ===
(key) (Bold – Pole position awarded by qualifying time. Italics – Pole position earned by points standings or practice time. * – Most laps led. ** – All laps led.)

CARS Late Model Stock Car Tour results
Year	Team	No.	Make	1	2	3	4	5	6	7	8	9	10	11	12	13	14	15	16	17	CLMSCTC	Pts	Ref
2023	R&S Race Cars	15C	Ford	SNM	FLC	HCY	ACE	NWS	LGY	DOM; 15	CRW; 19	HCY; 23	ACE; 16	TCM; 22	WKS	AAS; 18	SBO; 15	TCM; 26	CRW; 22		23rd	123	
2024	R&S Race Cars	15C	Ford	SNM; 13	HCY; 21	AAS; 22	OCS; 30	ACE	TCM	LGY	DOM; 17	CRW	HCY	NWS	ACE	WCS	FLC	SBO	TCM	NWS	N/A	0	
