= The Yellow Wallpaper (film) =

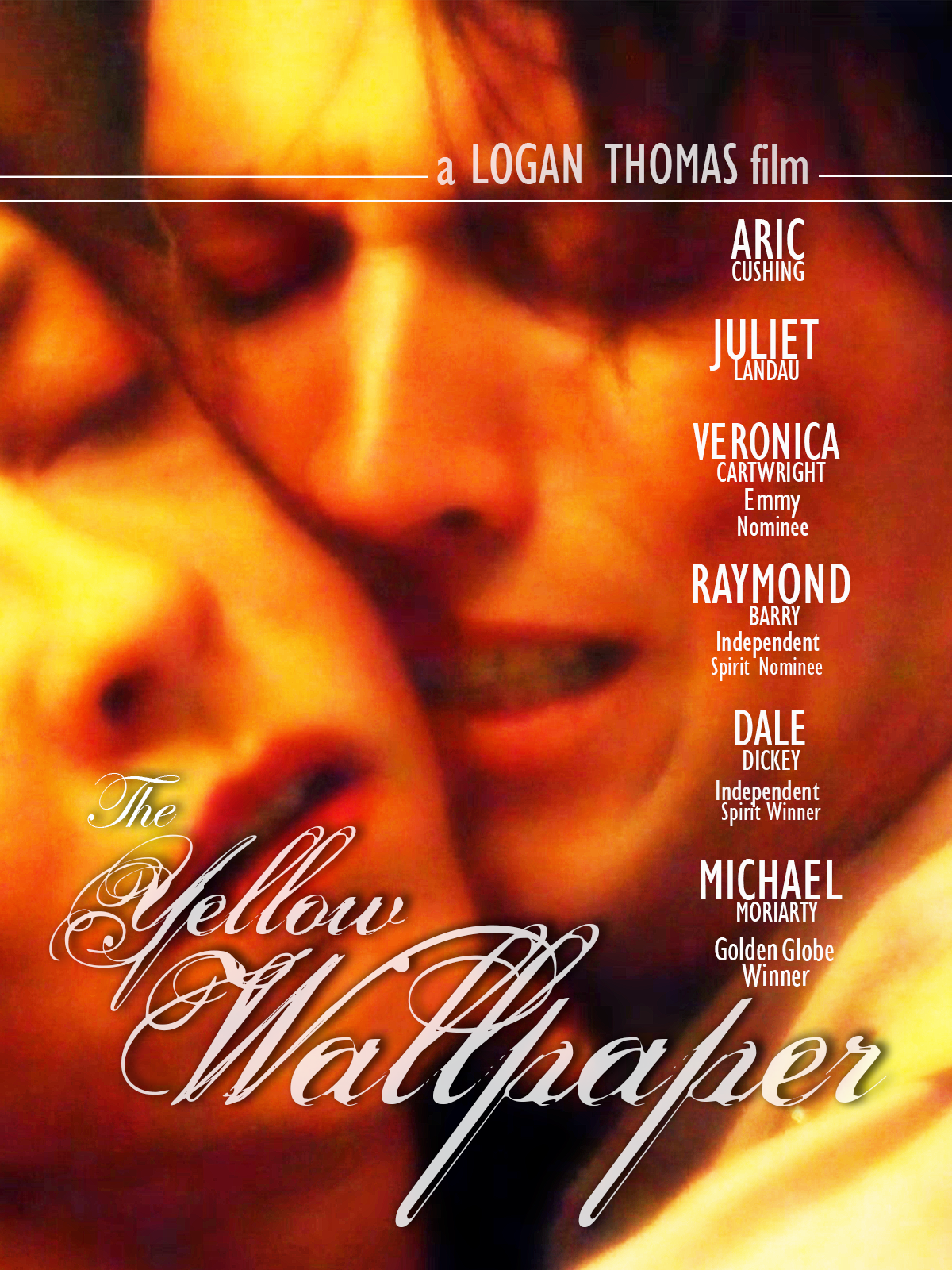
- Directed by: Logan Thomas
- Written by: Logan Thomas; Aric Cushing
- Based on: "The Yellow Wallpaper" by Charlotte Perkins Gilman
- Produced by: Logan Thomas; Aric Cushing
- Starring: Aric Cushing; Juliet Landau; Alex Schemmer; Dale Dickey; Veronica Cartwright; Michael Moriarty; Raymond J. Barry; Jessi Case; Gena Kay; Joseph Williamson
- Music by: Megan Mc Duffee
- Release date: January 2011
- Running time: 115 minutes
- Country: United States
- Language: English

The Yellow Wallpaper is a 2011 direct-to-video Gothic thriller film directed by Logan Thomas. It is based on the 1892 short story of the same name written by Charlotte Perkins Gilman.

== Plot ==
Writer Charlotte and her husband, doctor John, retreat to a countryside house with Charlotte's well-educated sister, Jennie, in an attempt to start their lives over after a fire killed their daughter Sarah and destroyed all their money and possessions. The house is full of dusty and rotten books, furniture, and clothing.

John attempts to go into town to make money and runs into an older couple complaining of the rats in the town. He then checks the house for rats and finds some underneath it. At night, Charlotte begins to go to the attic to write as the interesting wallpaper sparks ideas.

John awakes one night to find a man in the house. He attempts to find the man in the house but fails. The next night, Charlotte, John, and Jennie hear a man stomping on the roof. John goes outside to shoot him but instead finds a little girl on the roof. He tells Jennie and Charlotte that the fog got in his way and does not mention the girl.

John tells his friend Jack about the fire and how he was feeling. Jack then tells both him and Charlotte that they should make another child. Charlotte begins to hear Sarah's voice in the house, she runs inside to find her, and the doors shut John out. When John tries to open them, they shut on their own.

Jennie says that they should move houses, but both John and Charlotte believe that Sarah is somehow in the house. After Jennie has dreams about the same little girl John had seen on the roof, she digs a hole in the ground where the dream happened and discovers two coffins.

Jennie moves back East and leaves Charlotte and John alone in the house. John and Charlotte begin to make their house a home. They do activities together such as walking and dancing. Charlotte begins to write more. She writes "The Yellow Wallpaper", a story about someone living in the yellow wallpaper in the attic.

Jennie returns with Catherine, a psychic. Catherine says that there are spirits behind the wallpaper, including Sarah and many others. Charlotte asks if she can speak to Sarah and Catherine says it is a bad idea. Catherine states that there is a spirit under the house calling for John.

John goes under the house and his lantern goes out. John returns with Sarah in his arms. They bring Sarah inside and she states that she has been burning in Hell this entire time. The man that John had seen in the beginning appears and says that they will all burn in Hell and then both he and Sarah disappear. Charlotte breaks down and wants to find Sarah again, then becomes severely sick.

Jennie, Charlotte, and John all leave the house. John tells the ladies to not return to the house, then heads to town to get a carriage so they can all leave the house. John runs into a man who tells him to turn around. Charlotte and Jennie find a body in the previously opened coffins and feral dogs surround them as they look inside, and they run into the house for safety. When John returns to the house, he cannot find Charlotte or Jennie. He sees the spirits in the house, and they say he should have left a long time ago. After being struck by one of the spirits, he finds his dead wife.

Jack returns and tells John that Charlotte has now turned into a spirit. He says that the diseased house will keep her spirit alive as long as John can bring her souls that she can feed upon. If she is fed, she will live at night and be able to manipulate and control animals. John takes Charlotte and places her in the grave outside.

In modern times, the house is slightly updated. A vaguely older John is showing it to a couple for rent, so he can continue the cycle of feeding Charlotte.

== Cast ==
- Aric Cushing as Dr. John Weiland
- Juliet Landau as Charlotte Weiland
- Dale Dickey as Jennie Gilman
- Raymond J. Barry as Dr. Jack Everland
- Veronica Cartwright as Catherine Sayer
- Michael Moriarty as Mr. Isaac Hendricks
- Ted Manson as Sage at Duel
- Alex Schemmer as Duellist
- Keller Wortham as Duellist
- Jessi Case as Sarah Weiland at age 8
- Gena Kay as Colleen Preston
- Joseph Williamson as Travis Preston
- Sharon Blackwood as Mrs. Foucoult at Tea Party
- Stephanie Wing as Mrs. Tremayne at Tea Party
- Holly Stevenson as Mrs. Steele at Tea Party
- Cindy Pain as Mrs. Daygeron at Tea Party
- Margie Mack as Rat Woman
- Bob King as Rat Man
- Pieter Kloos as Eckhart Van Wakefield
- Earl Maddox as Burn in Hell Man
- Kyla Kennedy as Sarah Weiland at age 3
- Fara Eve Soleil as 17th Century Woman
- Thomas Rouzer as Mysterious Man in House
- Oliver R. Smith as William at Duel
- Wayne Dutton as Carriage Driver
- Brian Bremer as Man in Field (Scenes Deleted)

== Background ==
The film is a free adaptation of the Charlotte Perkins Gilman story, drawing from the original short story and a number of Gilman's other gothic works such as The Giant Wisteria and The Unwatched Door. The plot also includes elements of the actual writing of “The Yellow Wallpaper”.

== Production ==
Most of the scenes in The Yellow Wallpaper were shot in Eatonton, Georgia, in and around an isolated Civil War-era house. The farmhouse's location is undisclosed, meant to represent, as the director puts it, ' a space outside of space'. Jessi Case recalled being frightened of the house where the film was shot. 'The stairs leading to the attic, where we filmed a lot of the scenes, were very narrow and it was very hot. They didn't want me to go outside because my hair would poof up'.

After the shooting of the film, Michael Moriarty retired from acting. It was his last feature film role.

The cast also includes Juliet Landau as Charlotte and Aric Cushing as her husband John, Veronica Cartwright, Raymond J. Barry, and Dale Dickey.

The script was written in three months by Logan Thomas and Aric Cushing. Cushing's intention was to popularize Gilman's work.

Juliet Landau, during an interview, compared her role to Nicole Kidman's role in The Others.

This was Kyla Kennedy's first role at the age of 3.

Director Thomas used the Digital Sony 950, and the film is the first period feature film to be shot with this digital format. Thomas is becoming known as a "visualist" director in the tradition of David Lynch and Ridley Scott.

A companion book to the film was written, The Yellow Wallpaper and Other Gothic Stories, by Aric Cushing. The book features two stories previously unpublished since their inception, and seemingly lost. The essay in the beginning of the book was written by Cushing entitled "Is the Yellow Wallpaper a Gothic Story?"

== Release ==
After the film's release, the film was made available by Netflix, iTunes, and subsequently released on Amazon.

Aric Cushing said of the release of the film: "In the 1990s the trend in acquisition, as well as public consumption, was independent films. You could write, produce, and distribute a movie and make money. Redbox and Amazon has now killed that almost completely."

Upon the film's release, reviewers were polarized with such statements as "'Even as straight horror without any implications of living up to an established narrative, “Wallpaper” plays against some traditional horror conventions – and not in a good way.'" and "the film is atmospheric but feels at times that it is too languid in its approach." While other reviews commented, "'Luckily, the cliches are kept to a minimum, and as it turns out it's actually a rather unique take on the material, deftly blending psychological terror into the mix in a manner not unlike The Shining.'" and "The idea of male dominance and male-dominated culture is a favorite issue of Gilman’s, as well as the idea of there being no escape. That issue runs through most of her works, and “The Yellow Wallpaper” is no different. The movie version may be tamer, but the underlying theme is indeed still there. And while there are definitely similarities and differences between the two, when it comes down to it, in the end both women end up becoming the woman behind the wallpaper." Cushing commented in the introduction to his book Lost Essays, the film was both loved and loathed. The director Logan Thomas's comments on the film after the release were, "we never thought of it as a horror movie, more of a gothic mind bender" and, commenting on his new feature film There's No Such Thing as Vampires, "I certainly didn't want to do another slow-burn movie that was a head puzzle like The Yellow Wallpaper".

== Reception ==
An article analysing gender and thematic expectations in the film states: "Media makers can play on audiences’ expectations, creating a “palimpsestuous” relationship between the original and adaptive texts. Director Logan Thomas depends on his audience's prior engagement with Charlotte Perkins Gilman's short story “The Yellow Wallpaper” in his 2012 film of the same name. While the film is a clear departure from Gilman's text, acting as the origin story of the author's experience in writing the story, Thomas’ reliance on the viewers’ familiarity with Gilman is necessary to his larger trans-genre project. Thomas expects that his viewers will expect Gilman's gothic setting, tone, and language and delivers those expectations for much of the film. This palimpsest of genre expectation however becomes a perfect way for him to enhance audience fear when the film turns out to be a horror."
