= Timeline of Salem, Massachusetts =

This is a timeline of the history of the city of Salem, Massachusetts, United States.

== Timeline ==
=== 17th century ===
- 1626
  - English settlers arrive.
  - Roger Conant (colonist) arrives. Conant arrived at Plymouth Colony from London in 1624. Roger Conant and his family arrived in 1623 in the ship Anne, per Banks, only Roger's brother Christopher Conant is listed as being on the Anne in 1623.
- 1629
  - Town of Salem incorporated.
  - John Endecott one of the Fathers of Salem & longest serving Governor of the Massachusetts Bay Colony arrives in Salem after sailing from England. Today the Endicott Pear Tree, the oldest living fruit tree in North America in Danvers, Massachusetts in what used to be Salem.

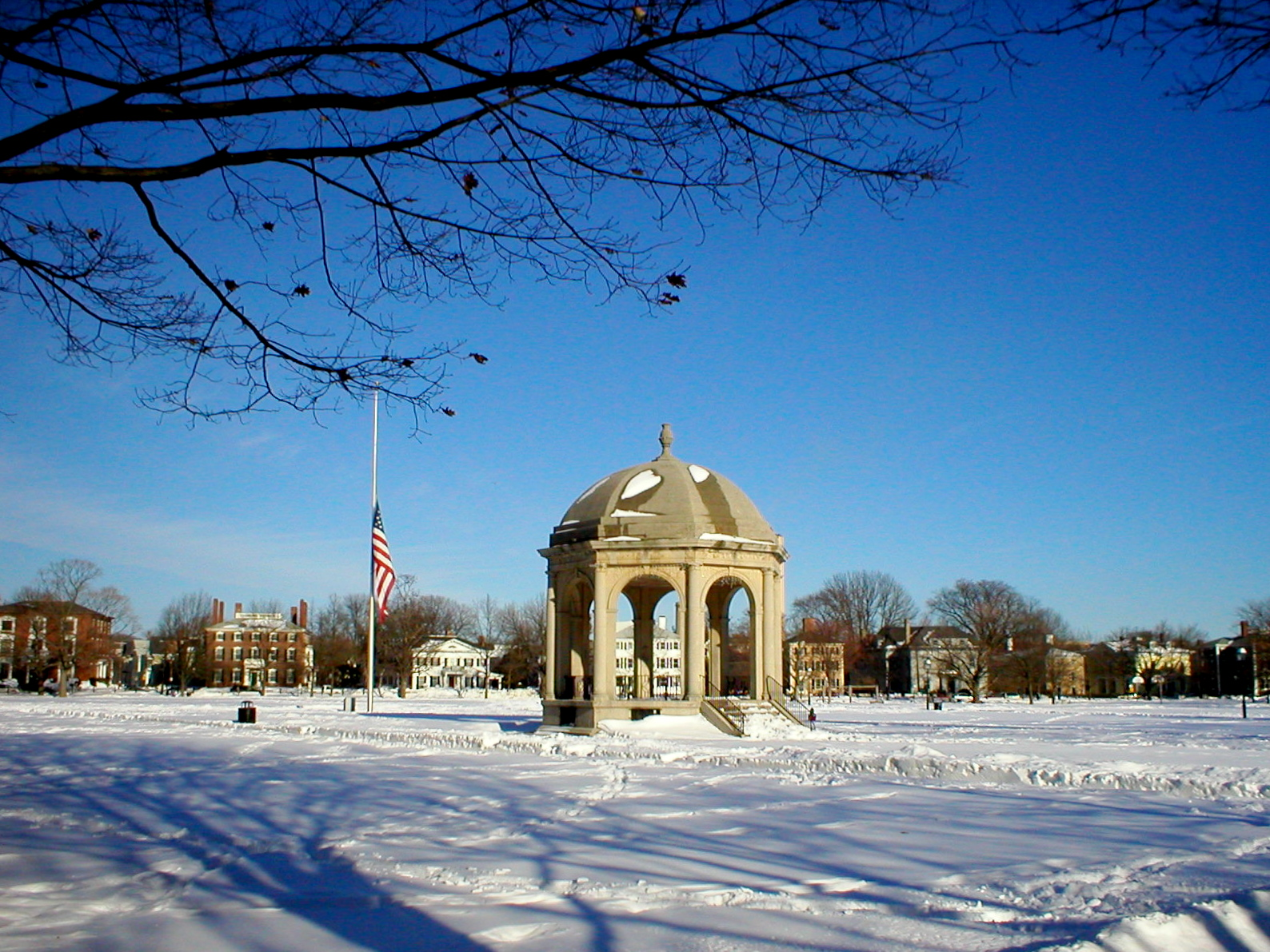
Salem Common during the winter

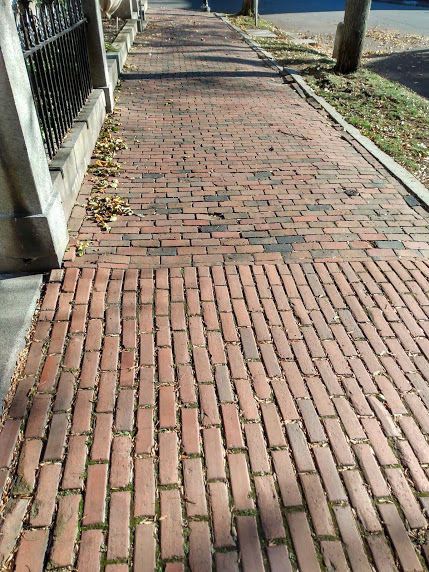
Brick sidewalk Salem, Massachusetts

- 1635
  - The first ropewalk in the Colonial United States is established at Collins Cove in Salem, Massachusetts. A ropewalk was a long, narrow building or open area where hemp fibers were twisted into ropes, essential for maritime activities such as ship rigging, fishing, and trade. Salem, a burgeoning port city in the Massachusetts Bay Colony, relied heavily on its maritime economy, making the ropewalk a critical component of its infrastructure.
- 1636
  - First muster on Salem Common. This was the first time that a regiment of militia drilled for the common defense of a multi-community area, thus laying the foundation for what became the Army National Guard.
- 1637
  - The first burial occurs in the Old Burying Point Cemetery, now Charter Street Cemetery.
- 1643
  - Under Governor John Endecott, construction begins on Fort Pickering, originally Fort William, to fortify Salem’s Winter Island. It was renamed in 1775 for Timothy Pickering, one of Salem's native sons. It was listed on the National Register of Historic Places in 1973.

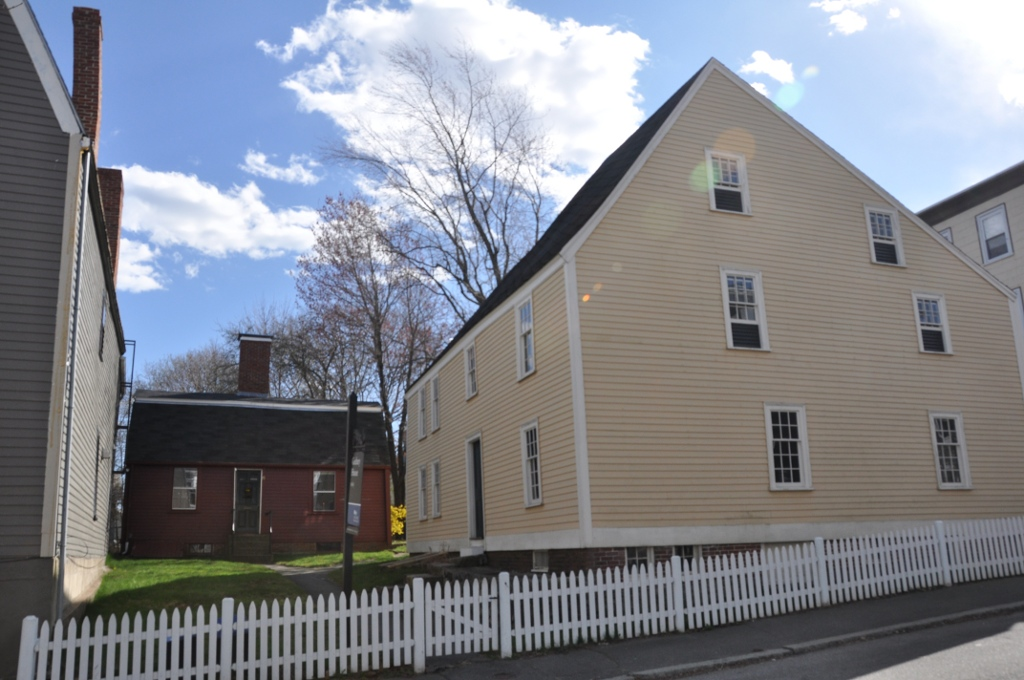
Gedney & Cox Houses

- 1649
  - What would be the 1st custom house in Salem is built to collect taxes on imported cargo. Located on what is now the Salem Maritime National Historic Site, it is managed by the National Park Service and is open for tours.
- 1655
  - The Retire Becket House is built and later moved in 1924 onto the campus of the House of the Seven Gables. Retire Beckett's was a notable shipbuilder; his Cleopatra's Barge was the first oceangoing yacht built in the United States. It was built in 1816 for owner George Crowninshield Jr.
- 1660
  - The Pickering House is constructed in the First Period style on Broad Street in what is today the Chestnut Street District. It is America’s oldest continuously family-occupied home. It is now a museum owned by the Pickering family.
- 1665
  - The Pickman House, a First Period structure located on Charter Street, is constructed. It is now owned by the Peabody Essex Museum & is not open to the public. Sources differ on the date the house was built.
  - The Gedney House, an exemplary structure of First Period colonial architecture, was erected on High Street, close to the intersection with Summer Street in the heart of downtown Salem. Preserved and operated as a non-profit museum by Historic New England, the house is infrequently open to the public.
- 1668
  - The first phase of the construction of the House of the Seven Gables is completed by John Turner I. It remained in his family for three generations and then was sold to Captain Ingersol in 1782. After this Nathaniel Hawthorne wrote The House of the Seven Gables, a Gothic novel written beginning in mid-1850 by American author Nathaniel Hawthorne. Elizabeth Cate Upton (1840–1909) purchased the Turner-Ingersoll Mansion in 1883 and lived in the house with her family until 1908 when they sold the site to Caroline Emmerton.
- 1675
  - Jonathan Corwin house is bought by Jonathan Corwin, a judge in the Salem Witch Trials. Now known as The Witch House, the house was originally built in 1642. The Witch House is managed by the City of Salem as a museum, offers self-guided tours.& located at the corner of Essex Street and Summer Street in the heart of vibrant downtown.
  - Narbonne House is constructed on what is now the Salem Maritime National Historic Site .
- 1668
  - On the 14th of October, part of Salem, called Bass River, was set off as the town of Beverly.
- 1682
  - The Hooper-Hathaway House at 23 Washington Street (a former bakery) was spared demolition moved next to the House of the 7 Gables (sparing demolition) in 1911 by a team effort of Caroline Emmerton and Historic New England.
  - John Ward House built. The house was moved to its present site in 1910 and restored by the Peabody Essex Museum. It is open for viewing on guided tour. Rooms on the first floor feature 17th-century furnishings.
- 1688
  - The western section William Murray House was built. It is three window bays wide and a single room in depth. The eastern section, also three bays wide and one room deep, was added in the late 17th or early 18th century.
- 1692
  - Salem witch trials begin.

=== 18th century ===
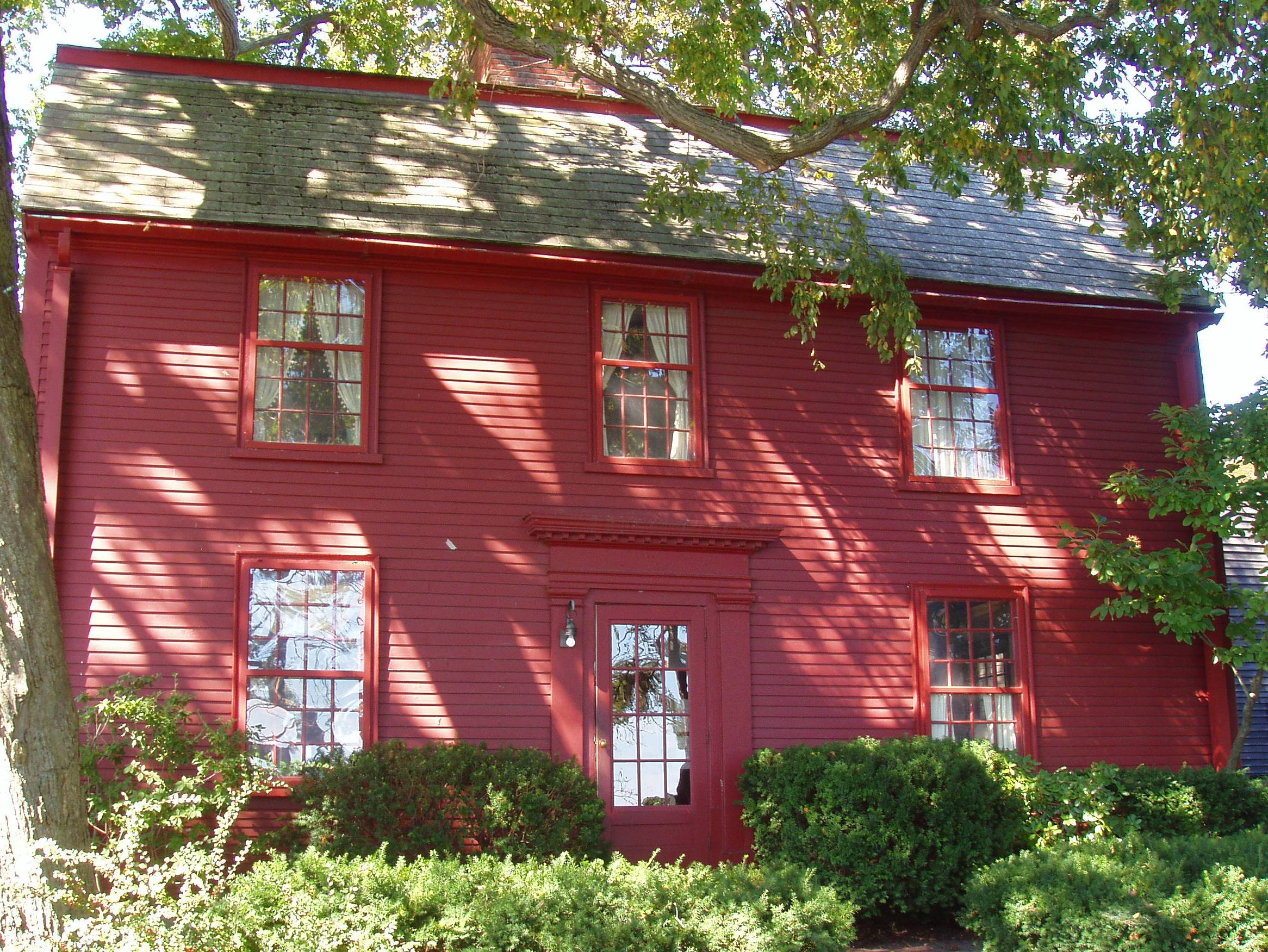
Nathaniel Hawthorne Birthplace, Salem, Massachusetts.

- 1712
  - Richard Derby was born in Salem, father to Elias Hasket Derby.
- 1727
  - Crowninshield-Bentley House was built (c. 1727 – 1730). A Colonial house in the Georgian style, located at 126 Essex Street, Salem, Massachusetts in the Essex Institute Historic District. It is now owned by the Peabody Essex Museum and open for public tours from June to October. It is located in what is now the Essex Institute Historic District.
- 1728
  - On June 20, 1728, portions of Salem, Andover, Boxford, and Topsfield in Essex County, Massachusetts, were incorporated to form the new town of Middleton. This was enacted by the Massachusetts General Court to address population growth and administrative needs in the region.
- 1739
  - Famous New England merchant Elias Hasket Derby, whose privateering ships took 150 prizes in the American Revolution, was born in Salem. He is believed to be one of the richest Americans at the time.
- 1745
  - Timothy Pickering was born in Salem. He was a prominent politician from Massachusetts who was in the United States Congress & the 3rd United States Secretary of State under George Washington.
- 1750
  - The Nathaniel Hawthorne Birthplace is built. It is a wooden house built on Union Street and moved in 1958 to the House of the 7 Gables property and now a Historic District. On the 4th of July 1804 to 1808 Hawthorne lived. American author Nathaniel Hawthorne was born. It is located at 27 Hardy Street but accessible through 54 Turner Street, Salem, Massachusetts. The house is now a nonprofit museum along with the House of the Seven Gables.
- 1757
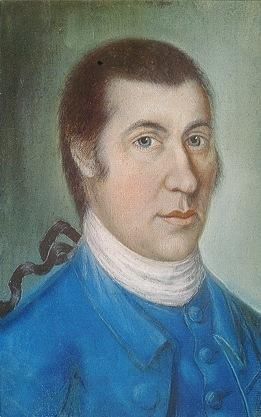
  - Samuel McIntire, c. 1786, pastel portrait attributed to Benjamin Blyth
    Samuel McIntire, American architect and craftsman, is born in Salem.
- 1760
  - The Salem Social Library, a (proprietary library) was established, also known as the Social Library in Salem, was a proprietary library located in Salem, Massachusetts. One of the earliest lending libraries in the American colonies.
- 1762
  - The Derby House is built. Within the Salem Maritime National Historic Site, it is Salem’s oldest brick house. The Georgian style house was home to Richard Derby and his son, Elias Hasket Derby.
  - Derby Wharf (1762, extended 1806), Salem's longest wharf at 0.4 miles, is constructed. The Derby Wharf Light (1871) remains at the end of the wharf.
- 1766
  - The Salem Marine Society was established in Salem & still holds meetings at the Hawthorne Hotel.The Salem Marine Society, founded in 1766 in Salem, Massachusetts, is one of the oldest marine societies in the United States, established to support maritime trade, navigation, and the welfare of seafarers.
- 1767
  - The Jonathan Neal House is constructed at 12 Broad Street. Jonathan Neil was a carpenter who owned a waterfront warehouse in Salem. Recent research shows that parts of the house may date back to 1652.

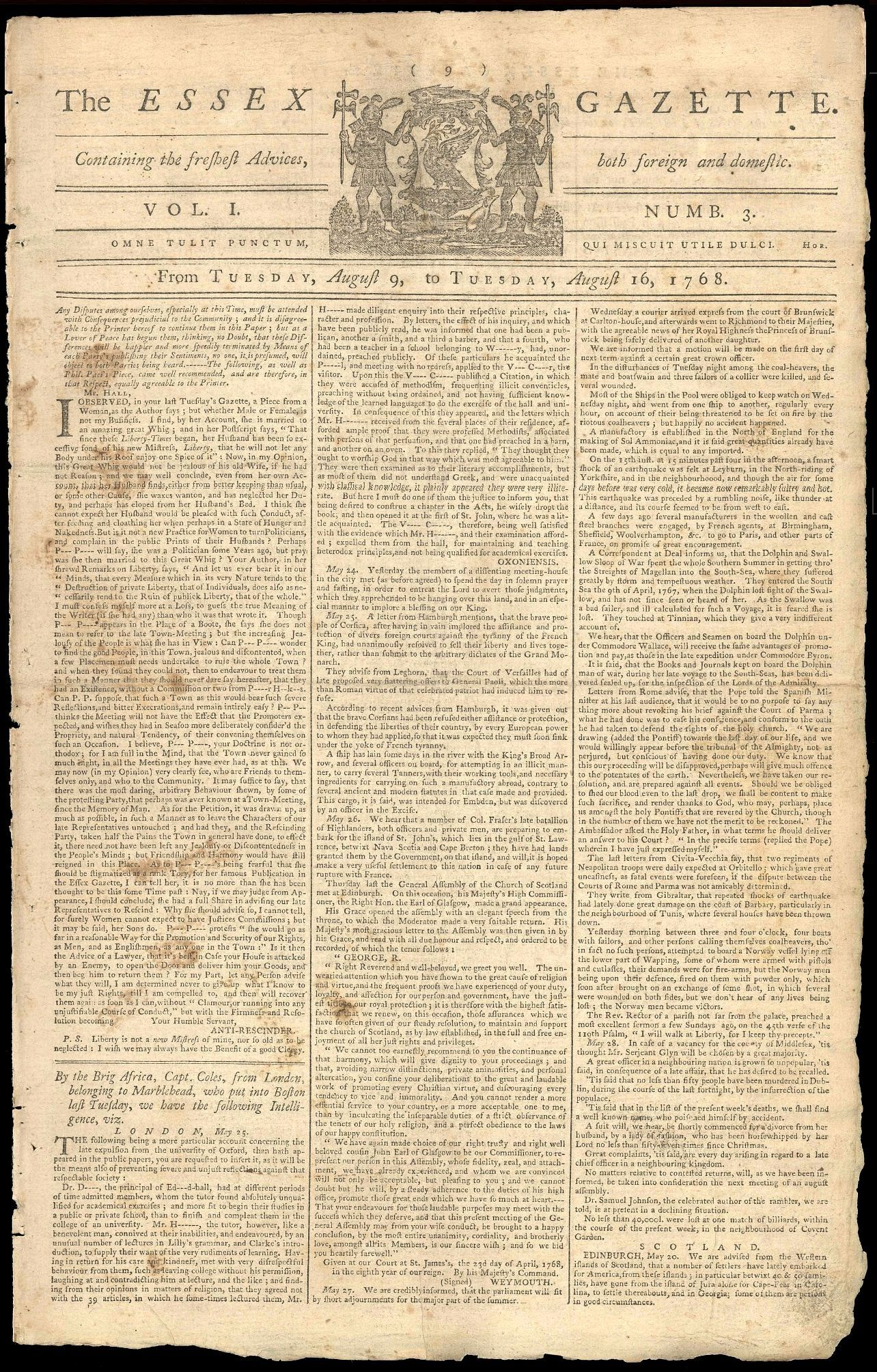
The Essex Gazette on August 9th 1768.

- 1768
  - The Essex Gazette newspaper begins publication. It was a weekly newspaper established in 1768 by Samuel Hall in Salem, Massachusetts, as the city's first newspaper and the first published in Massachusetts outside Boston. It was the third newspaper to appear in Massachusetts.
- 1773
  - Nathaniel Bowditch (March 26, 1773 – March 16, 1838) American mathematician, born in Salem and his book The New American Practical Navigator, first published in 1802, is still carried on board every commissioned U.S. Naval vessel.

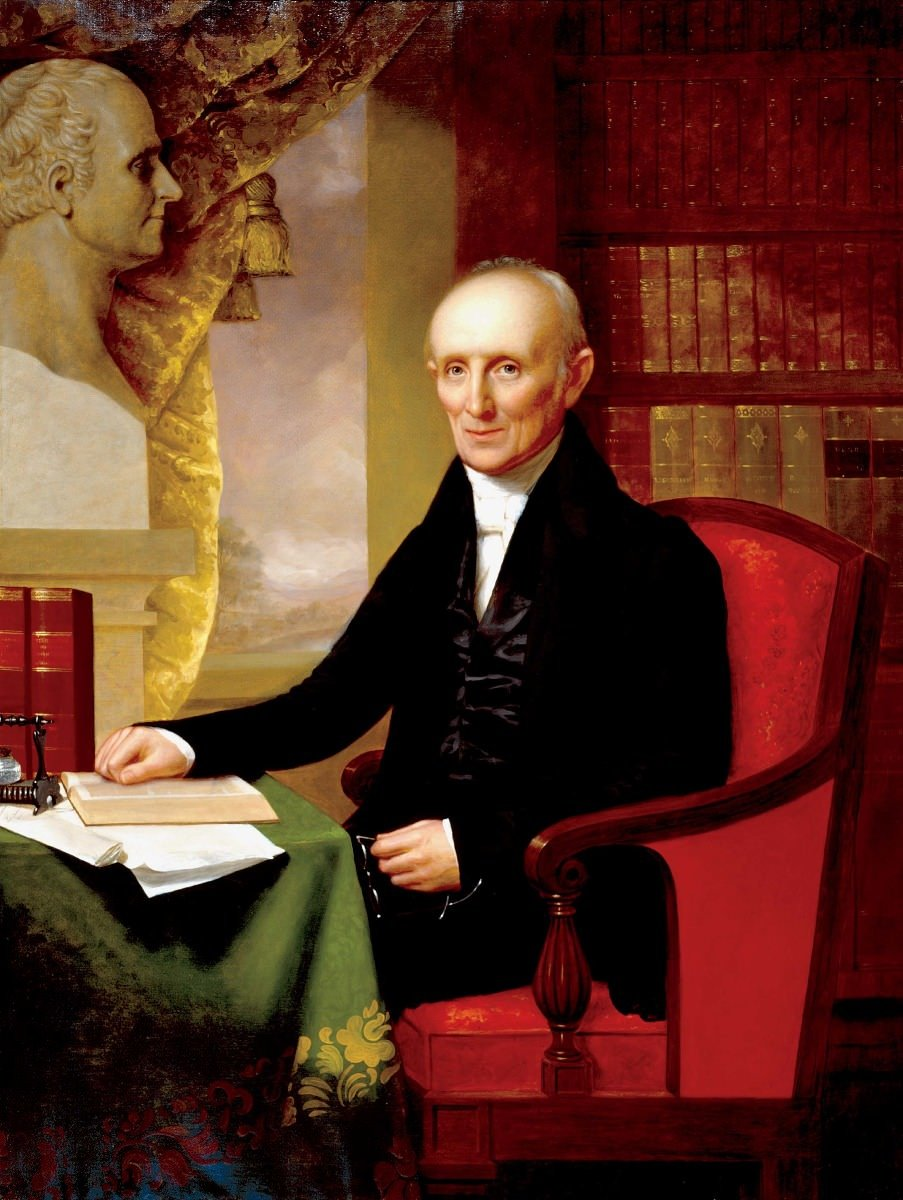
Nathaniel Bowditch

- 1774
  - Royal governor General Thomas Gage moved the capital of Massachusetts to Salem in June 1774 as a result of protests resulting from the Boston Tea Party.
- 1775
  - On February 26, 1775, patriots raised the drawbridge at the North River, preventing British Colonel Alexander Leslie and his 300 troops of the 64th Regiment of Foot from seizing stores and ammunition hidden in North Salem. This is known today as the Salem Gunpowder Raid.
- 1776
  - Fort Lee built for the American Revolutionary War & it was last garrisoned in 1898 during the Spanish-American War.
- 1780
  - May 19: New England's Dark Day, an unusual darkening of the day sky over the New England states and parts of Canada, so complete that candles were required from noon on. It is thought to have been caused by a combination of smoke from forest fires, a thick fog, and cloud cover, and did not disperse until the middle of the next night.
  - The Grand Turk was launched in Salem by Elias Hasket Derby. This was the first ship to trade using the Canton System & the Old China Trade.
  - Benjamin Hawkes House (a Federal mansion) built in the Derby Wharf Historic District on Derby Wharf. It was home to Benjamin Hawkes, a prominent shipbuilder.
- 1781
  - Salem Philosophical Library organized & in 1810 merged into the newly formed Salem Athenaeum.
- 1782
  - Peirce-Nichols House built. It is now a National Historic Landmark.
  - Cotting-Smith Assembly House is built at 138 Federal Street as a Federalist Clubhouse in which balls, concerts, lectures, and other events might be held. It is now owned by the Peabody Essex Museum. George Washington attended a dance here. The original architect is unknown, but the house was later remodeled by Samuel McIntire for use as a private residence. The house is in the Federal style and is listed in the National Register of Historic Places.
  - The Captain Ingersol mansion, (now the house of the 7 Gables.) John Turner III lost every thing and the house was sold to another mariner, Samuel Ingersoll, in 1782.
- 1784
  - The Joshua Ward House, a three-story Federal style brick house was built in 1784 and is one of the first brick houses in Salem. Its interior woodwork was done by noted Salem builder and woodworker Samuel McIntire, including an original staircase that is the oldest surviving staircase created by him. George Washington is reported to have specifically requested staying in this house when he visited Salem in 1789.
- 1785
  - Original court house of Essex County Court Buildings built at 32 Federal Street. It was added to the National Register of Historic Places in 1976.
- 1786
  - Salem Mercury newspaper begins publication.

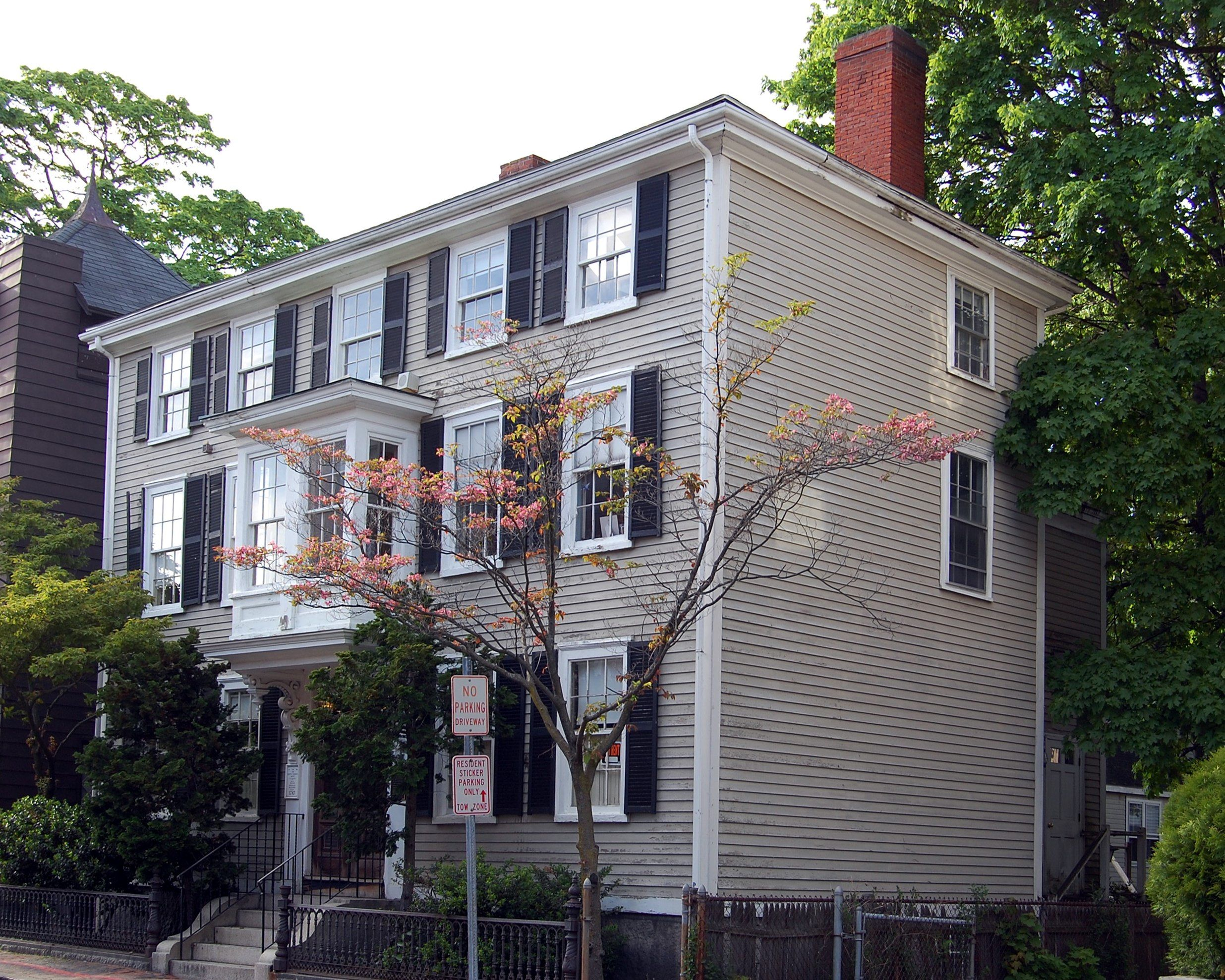
Rufus Choate House, (National Register of Historic Places) 1787.

- 1790
  - Salem Gazette newspaper begins publication.
  - The "Salem Book-Store", which offered books for sale or short-term rental was opened & operated by John Dabney.
  - Salem's population in 1790 was 7,921.
- 1791
  - Bakers Island Light established.
- 1796
  - Chestnut Street is drafted and is now the Chestnut Street District.
- 1797
  - Friendship built. She made 15 voyages during her career, to Batavia, India, China, South America, the Caribbean, England, Germany, the Mediterranean, and Russia; she was captured as a prize of war by the British in September 1812.
  - Salem and Danvers Aqueduct incorporated.
- 1799
  - The USS Essex was launched in Salem for the United States Navy & built by Salem shipbuilder Enos Briggs.
  - East India Marine Society established.

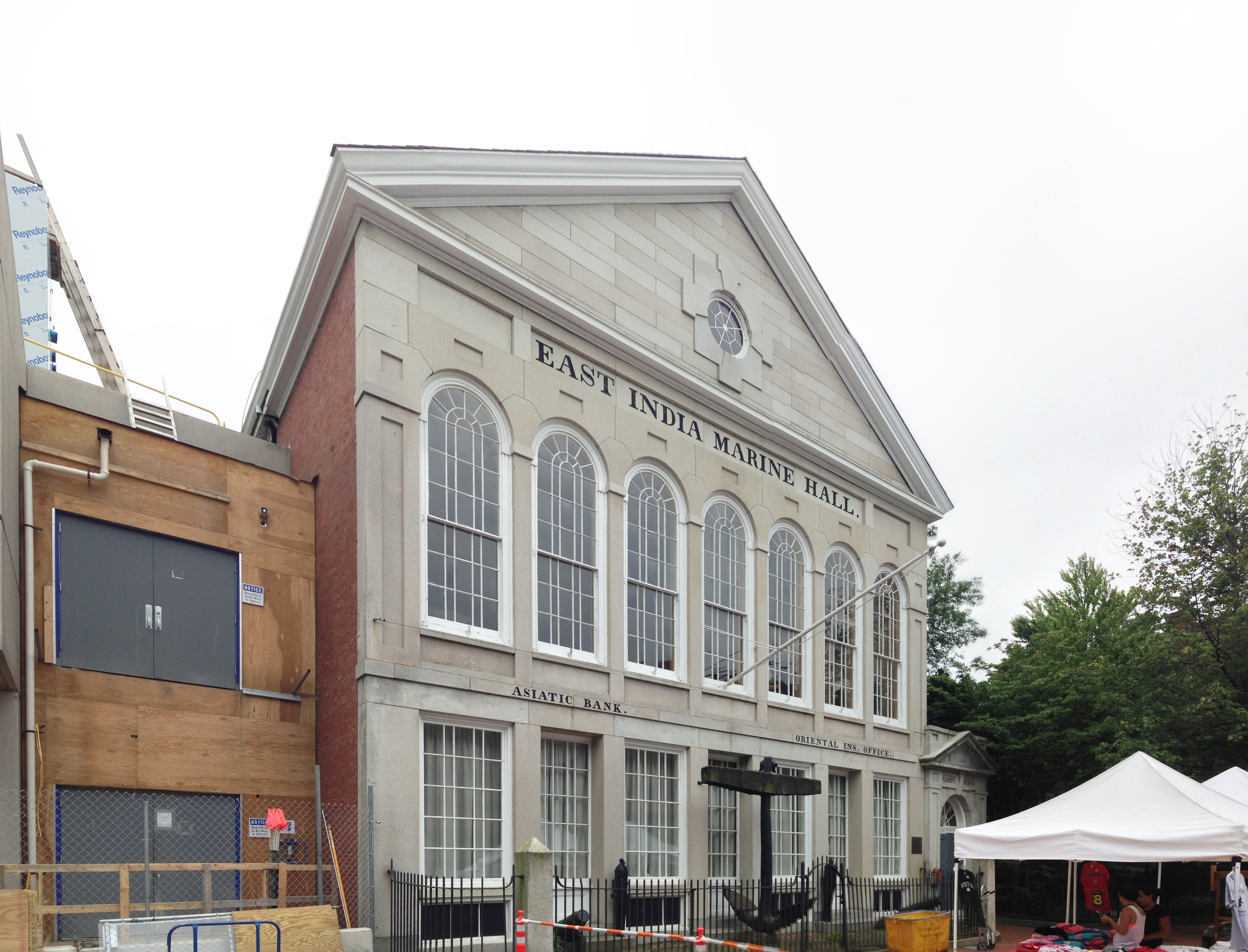
East India Marine Hall in 2013, now part of the Peabody Essex Museum

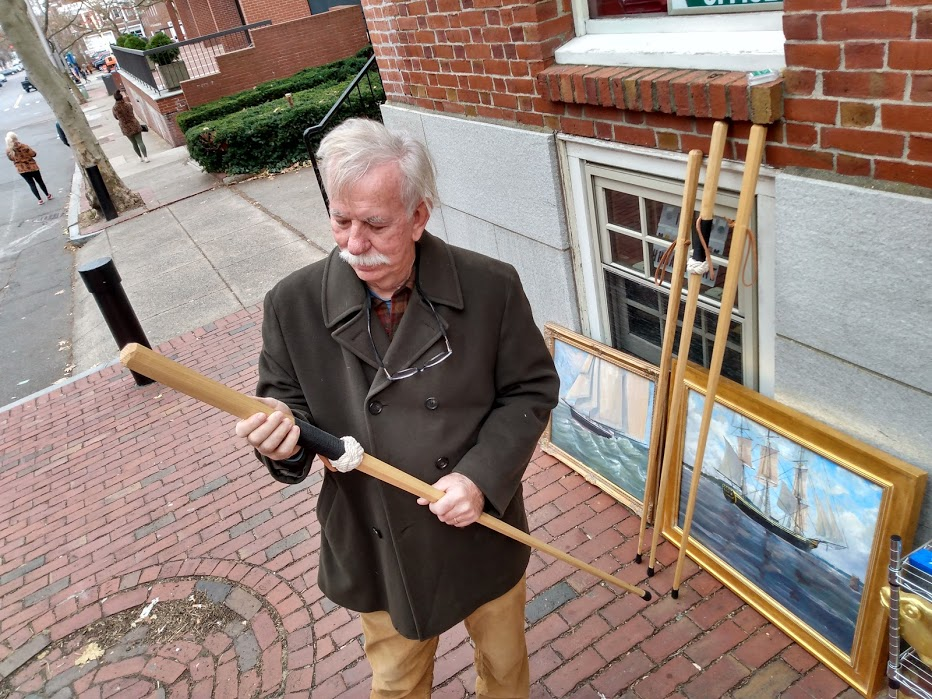
(built, 1805) Customs House. Downtown Salem, MA

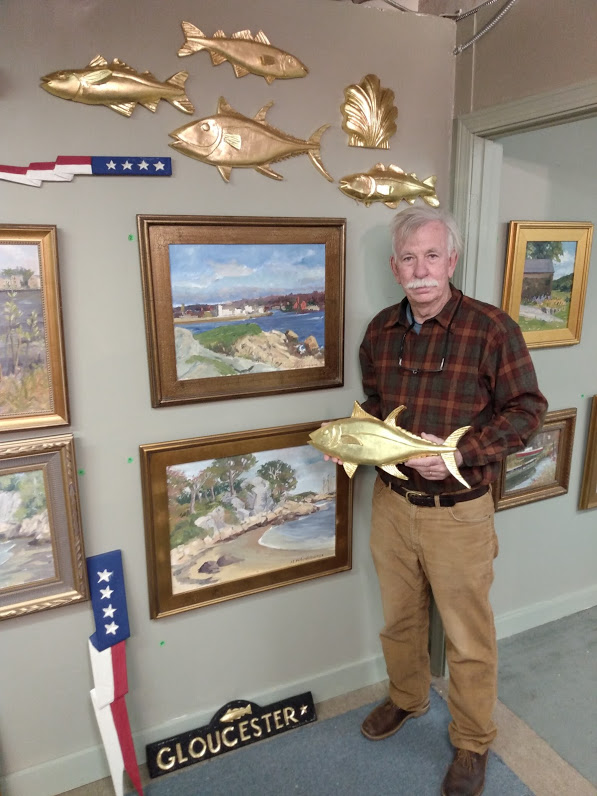
Topmast Studio (WORKSHOP) Salem Massachusetts

=== 19th century ===
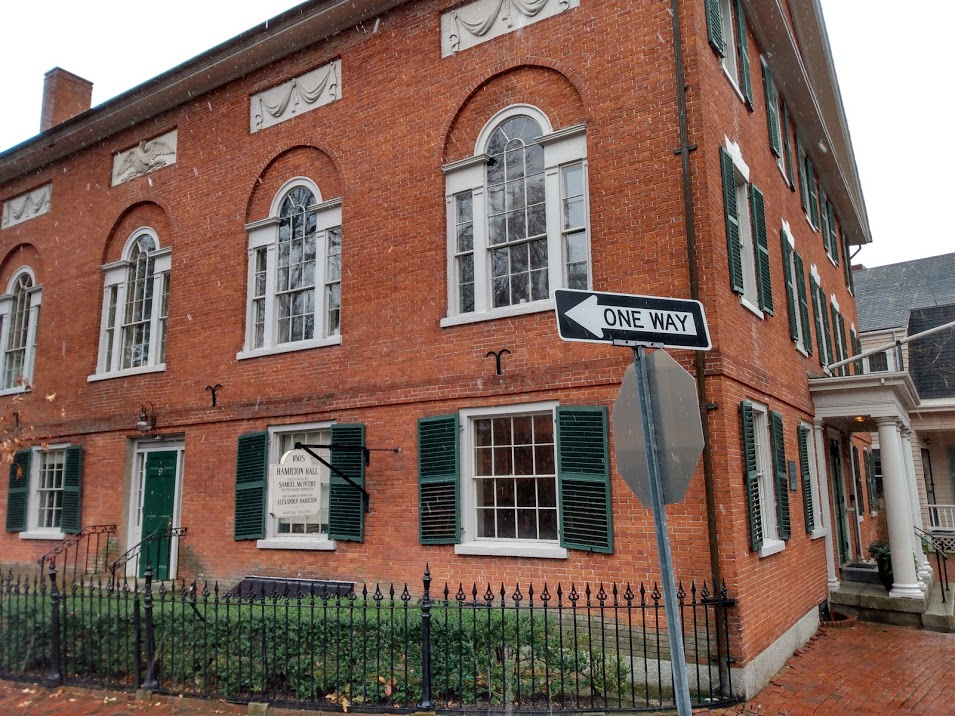
Hamilton Hall Chestnut Street, Salem Massachusetts

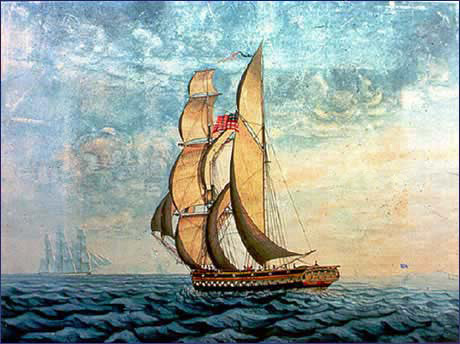
Cleopatra's Barge painted in 1818

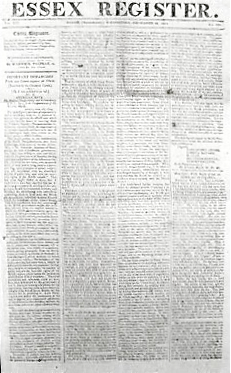
Essex Register published in Salem 1807–1840

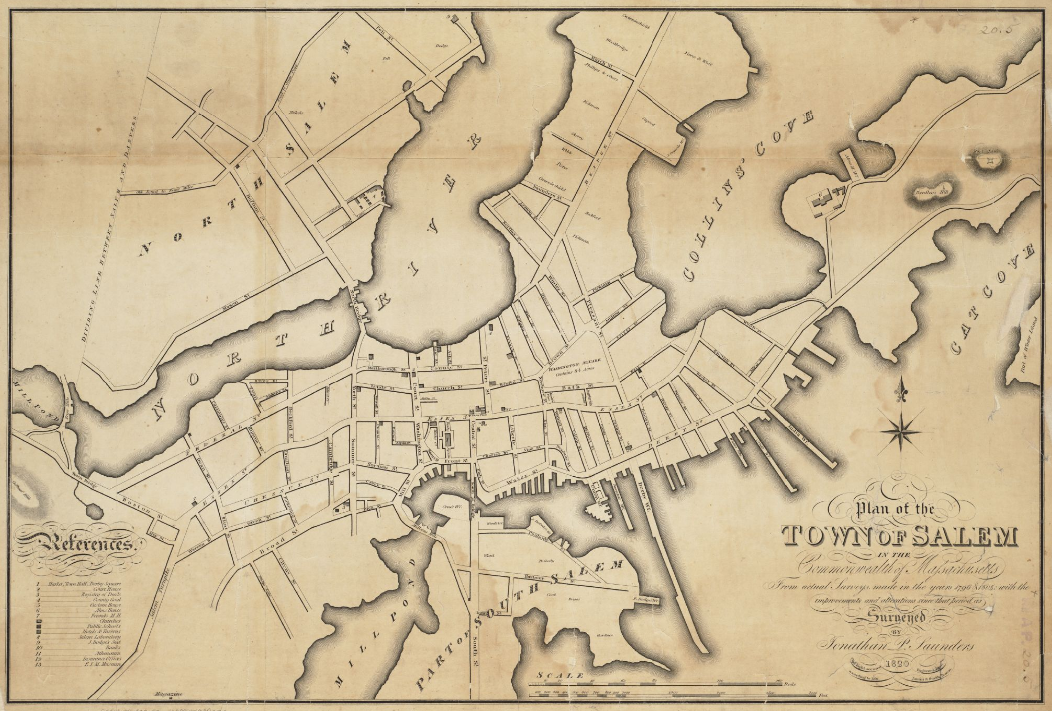
Map of Salem, 1820

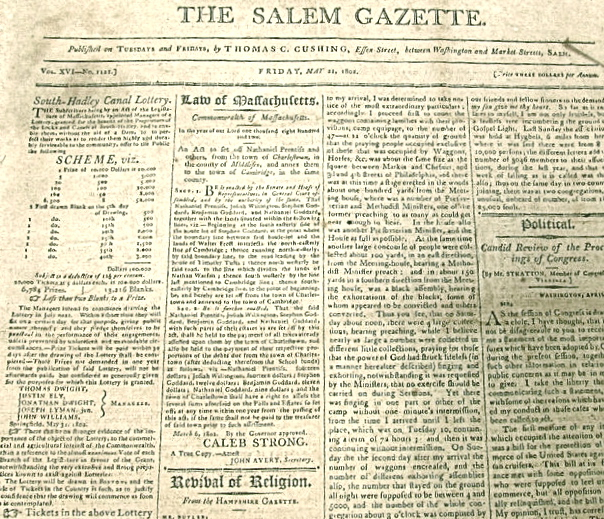
Salem Gazette, 1802

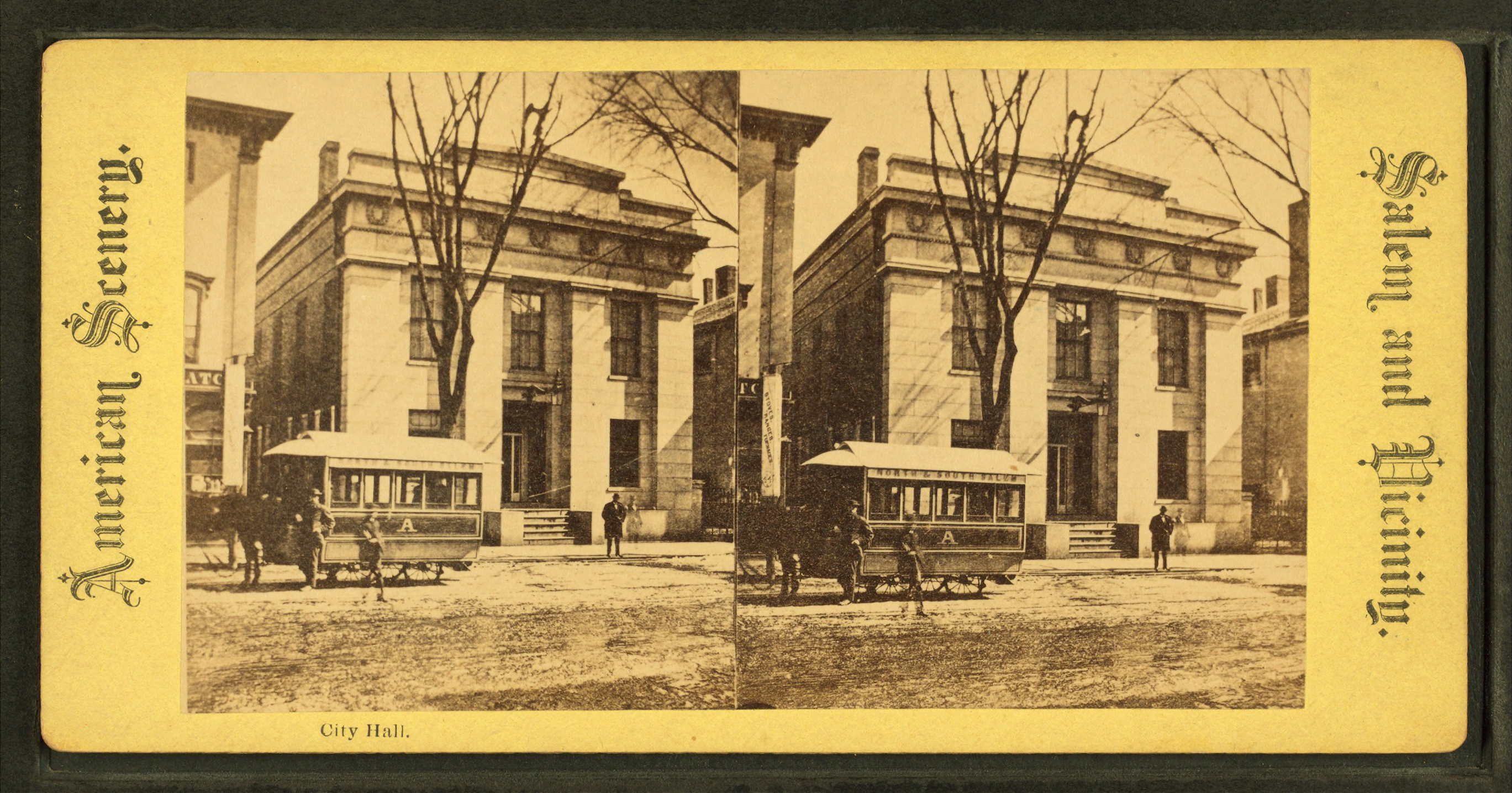
City Hall, built 1838 (photo later 19th century)

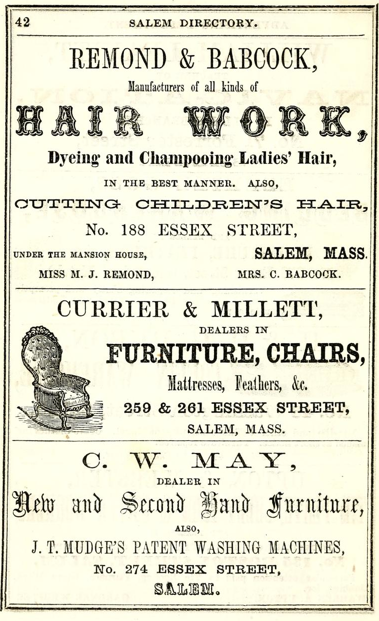
Advertisements for Salem businesses, 1857

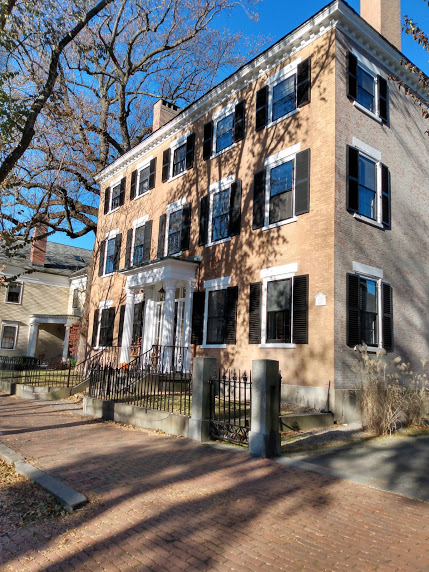
12 Chestnut Street

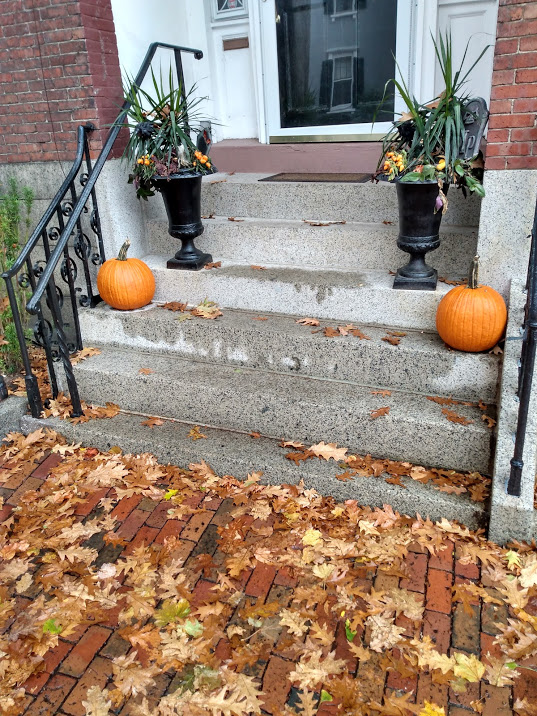
Autumn leaves with two pumpkin on Chestnut Street

- 1800
  - Impartial Register newspaper begins publication.
  - Ebenezer Shillaber Mansion is constructed at 128 Federal Street.
- 1804
  - Gardner-Pingree House was built by Samuel McIntire in a Federal style.
  - American Novelist Nathaniel Hawthorne was born on the 4th of July 1804 in Salem.
- 1805
  - First Universalist congregation founded.
  - Hamilton Hall built in a Federal style in 1805 by Samuel McIntire and added to the National Register of Historic Places in 1970.
  - Nathaniel Bowditch House built (circa 1805) at 9 North Street in the Federal Street District. It was once the home of Nathaniel Bowditch, the founder of modern navigation and author of The New American Practical Navigator. It is now a National Historic Landmark and listed in the National Register of Historic Places. It currently serves as the home of Historic Salem, Inc.
  - The Captain Jonathan Hodges constructed at brick Federal mansion at 12 Chestnut Street.
  - The Rufus Choate House was built. It is now in the National Register of Historic Places. A three-story Federal style wood-frame house that was built in 1805 by Ebenezer Beckford, a Salem merchant and real estate developer.
- 1806
  - The Stephen Phillips House was built & is now in the National Register of Historic Places.
  - Derby Wharf extended. Salem's longest wharf (nearly 1/2-mile). When in active use, it was lined with warehouses of goods from around the world. (Originally constructed 1762.)
- 1808
  - First Universalist Church built. It is now in the National Register of Historic Places.
- 1809
  - Sophia Hawthorne, an American Painter, Illustrator & Wife to Nathaniel Hawthorne was born in Salem.
  - Thomas March Woodbridge House built
- 1810
  - Salem Athenaeum founded at 337 Essex Street in what is today the McIntire Historic District, named after woodcarver & architect Samuel McIntire.
  - Bible Society of Salem instituted.
- 1811
  - Joseph Story House built at 26 Winter Street for Associate Justice of the Supreme Court of the United States Joseph Story. It is now a National Historic Landmark.
  - Bessie Monroe House built.
  - A large Federal Period house is built at 26 Winter Street.
  - Salem Charitable Mechanic Association organized.
  - Handel Society formed.
- 1812
  - During the War of 1812 Fort Lee was rearmed & United States Navy were posted.
- 1816
  - Salem Old Town Hall built. It is the earliest surviving municipal structure in Salem (dating from 1816 to 1817) and an outstanding example of Federal architecture. The second floor of the building, Great Hall, has always been used as a public hall. The first floor, originally a public market, now houses the Salem Museum.
  - Cleopatra's Barge was the first oceangoing yacht built in the United States. Launched on October 21, 1816, in Salem.
- 1818
  - Salem Evangelical Library formed.
- 1819
  - Salem Society for the Moral and Religious Instruction of the Poor formed.
  - Andrew–Safford House built, designed in the Federal style for a wealthy Russian fur merchant. It was reputed to have been the most costly house in the United States. It is now owned by the Peabody Essex Museum and listed in the National Register of Historic Places.
  - The Salem Customs House was built on what is now the Salem Maritime National Historic Site. This is the 13th Customs House in Salem; the first was built in 1649. Each collected taxes on imported cargoes.
- 1820
  - 1838: A rugged stone tower was added to the existing Bakers Island Light Lighthouse on Bakers Island., now stands taller, its light cutting through the Atlantic's misty veil to guide mariners home.
- 1821
  - Essex Historical Society incorporated.
  - Haydn Society formed.
- 1823
  - Salem Observer newspaper begins publication.
- 1825
  - East India Marine Hall built.
  - Mozart Association organized.
- 1830
  - Salem Lyceum formed.
  - Bowker Place built at 144–156 Essex Street in Downtown Salem, Massachusetts. Built in 1830 as commercial building that has businesses today like a tremendous coffee shop and candy shop.
- 1831
  - Salem Dispensary incorporated.
  - Salem Mercury newspaper begins publication.
- 1832
  - Samaritan Society formed.
  - Salem Advertiser and Argus newspaper begins publication.
  - Salem Glee Club formed.
- 1833
  - Essex County Natural History Society was a trailblazing organization devoted to exploring and preserving the region’s natural heritage. Established to promote the science of natural history, it aimed to amass a definitive collection of Essex County’s natural specimens, curiosities, and a robust library of scientific literature. Incorporated in 1836 by visionaries Andrew Nichols, William Oakes, and William Prescott, the society attracted notable figures like Samuel B. Buttrick, Samuel P. Fowler, John M. Ives, John C. Lee, and Henry Wheatland. Growing to 100 members by 1836, it became a cornerstone of Salem’s intellectual community. Its collections and library found homes in various Salem locations, from Essex Place to Franklin Building, Chase’s Building on Washington Street, and finally Pickman Place in 1842. In 1848, the society joined forces with the Essex Historical Society to create the Essex Institute, cementing its role as a catalyst for scientific inquiry and cultural enrichment in Salem.
  - Seamen's Widow and Orphan Association formed.
- 1834
  - West Cogswell House, a historic set of row houses, built at 5–9 Summer Street in Salem, Massachusetts. It was added to the National Register of Historic Places in 1983. The house is a group of three brick Greek Revival rowhouses that were built in 1834 by Nathaniel West, one of Salem's leading sea captains and merchants.
- 1836
  - City of Salem incorporated.
  - Leverett Saltonstall becomes mayor.
- 1838
  - City Hall built.
  - Service on the Eastern Railroad from Salem to East Boston began on August 27, 1838, with fares half that of competing stagecoaches.

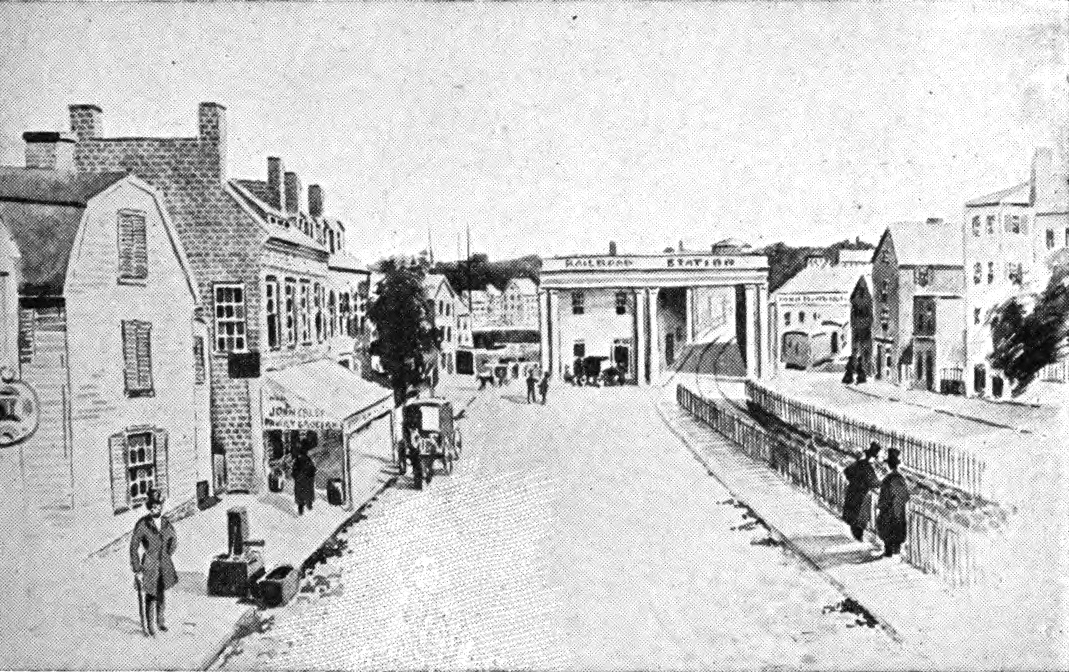
A late drawing of the first station in Salem, Massachusetts and based on an early dauguerrotype taken between 1839 and 1848. Drawn by George Elmer Browne (born in 1871) sometime before 1917

- 1839
  - Salem Children's Friend Society organized.
  - Salem Social Singing Society organized.
  - The railroad in Salem received much more traffic than expected, and a branch line from Salem to Marblehead opened on December 10, 1839
- 1840
  - Harmony Grove Cemetery established.
- 1841
  - Female Washington Total Abstinence Society formed.
  - The Old Granite Courthouse built in the Greek Revival architectural style. Also known (circa 1862) as the County Commissioner's Building,
- 1844
  - A large Federal Period house is built at 24 Winter Street for Captain John Bertram.
- 1845
  - A large Federal Period house is built at 16 Winter Street. The Amelia Payson house at 16 Winter Street is today a Bed & Breakfast
- 1846
  - Salem Academy of Music formed.
- 1848
  - The Essex Institute, a vibrant hub of culture and scholarship, dedicated to preserving and sharing the region’s rich history, art, and scientific discoveries. It housed an extensive library, a museum showcasing local and global artifacts, and meticulously preserved historic homes, offering a window into Salem’s past. The institute also hosted engaging educational programs and published a wealth of scholarly works, fostering a deep appreciation for New England’s heritage. In 1992, it united with the Peabody Museum of Salem to create the world-renowned Peabody Essex Museum, cementing its legacy as a cornerstone of cultural preservation in my hometown of Salem.

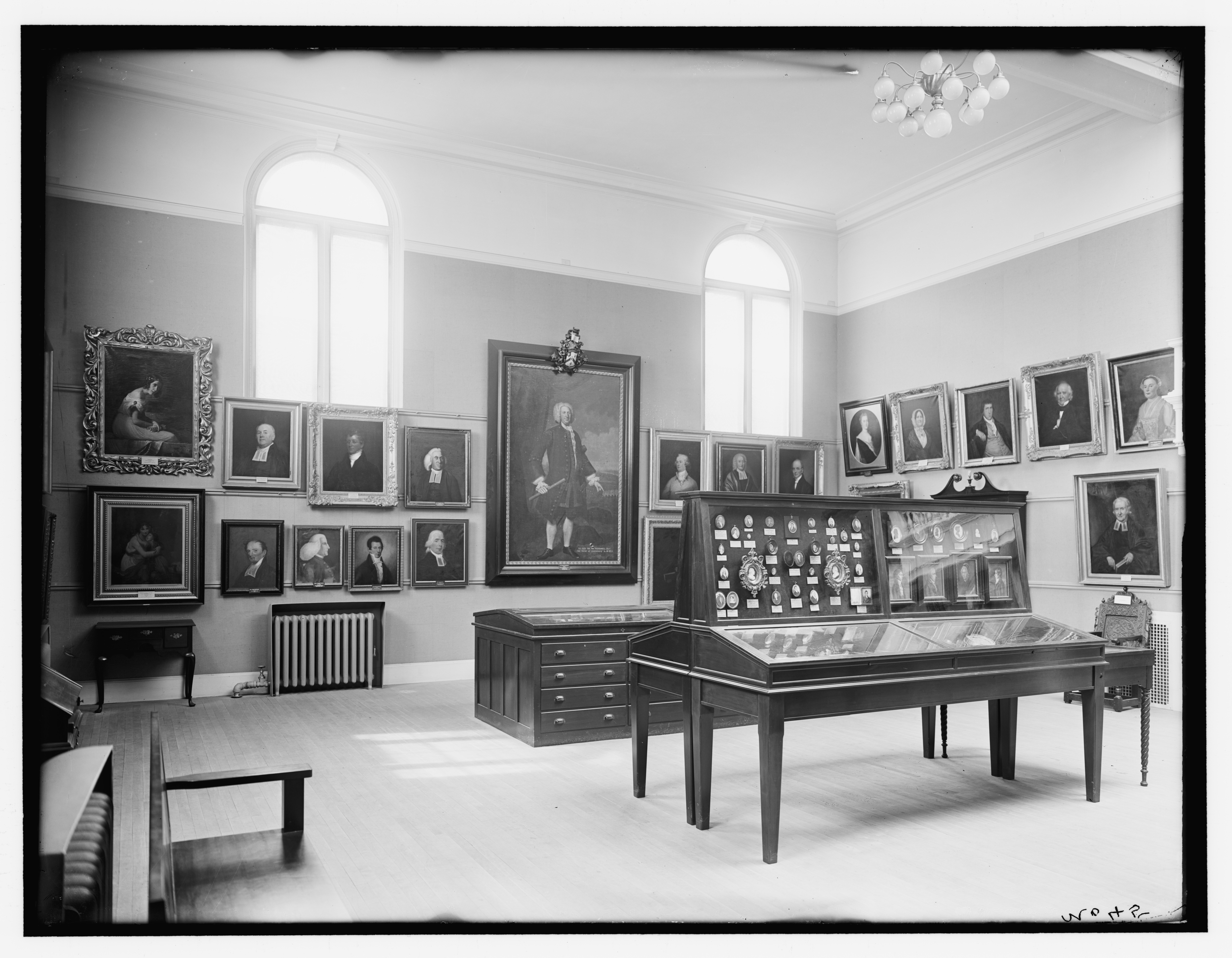
Essex Institute, Salem, Massachusetts, c. 1900 – 1910 at the Essex Institute.

- 1849
  - Salem Philharmonic Society formed.
  - 1850
  - Salem native Nathaniel Hawthorne publishes The Scarlet Letter.
  - A small house is built at 14 Burnside Street.
  - A large Federal Period houses are built at 2 & 3 Winter Street.
- 1851
  - Nathaniel Hawthorne's The House of the Seven Gables, a novel set in Salem, is published.
  - The Shepard Block built in the Greek Revival style at 298–304 Essex Street in the Chestnut Street District. It was added to the National Register of Historic Places in 1983.
- 1852
  - John Tucker Daland House built.

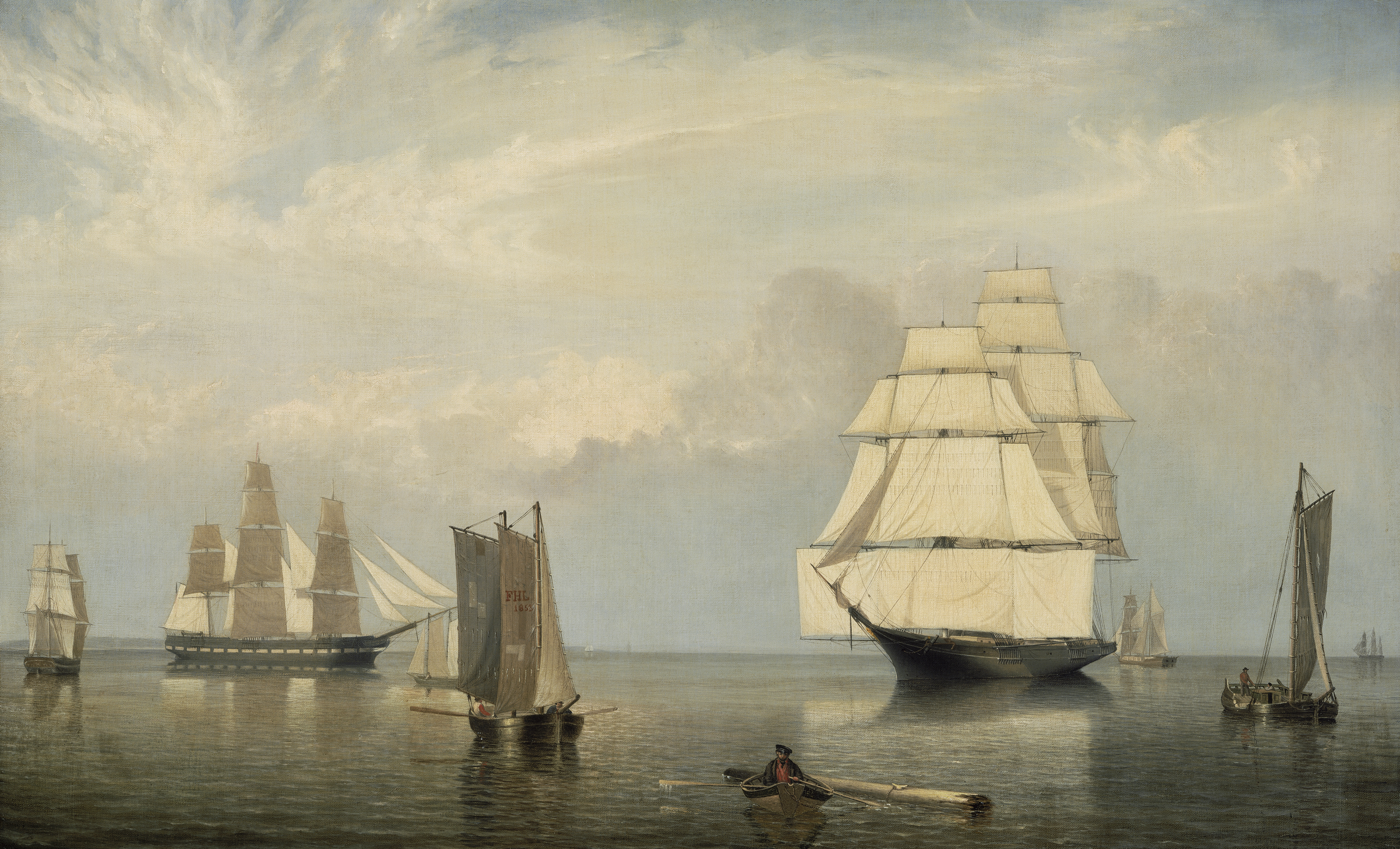
Salem Harbor, oil on canvas, Fitz Hugh Lane, 1853. Museum of Fine Arts, Boston.

- 1854
  - Salem Normal School established.
  - With direct Railroad connections to most of the major cities of northeastern Massachusetts by 1850, Salem became a major railroad junction.
- 1855
  - Salem Choral Society organized.
  - Salem Musical Education Society formed.
  - The stone structures on Bakers Island were replaced in 1855 with a brick light tower and wood-framed keeper's dwelling.
  - The Plummer Home for Boys in Salem, Massachusetts, was founded in 1855. Caroline Plummer, a Salem resident, bequeathed a substantial sum in her will to establish a "farm school of reform for boys". This funding was used to establish the home, initially intended for juvenile offenders.
- 1857
  - Plummer Hall built.
- 1858
  - Salem Willows public park established on 35 acres with beaches, a pier, a yacht club, and a boardwalk with an arcade as well as take-out restaurants.
- 1860
  - A mixed use commercial & multi residential building is constructed at 116 Boston Street.
- 1861–1865
  - A Garrison at Fort Lee in Salem had many Troops stationed during the American Civil War.
- 1866
  - An Incredible high style Victorian is constructed at 170 Federal Street.
  - Caroline Emmerton was born in Salem and in 1908 would purchase the House of the 7 Gables, The Hooper-Hathaway House (1682) was moved to the property in 1911. The Retire Becket House (1655) was saved in 1924.
  - John P. Peabody House built at 15 Summer Street
- 1868
  - Peabody Academy of Science organized.
  - Salem Oratorio Society formed.
  - The present tower for the Lighthouse was built on Bakers Island in 1855.

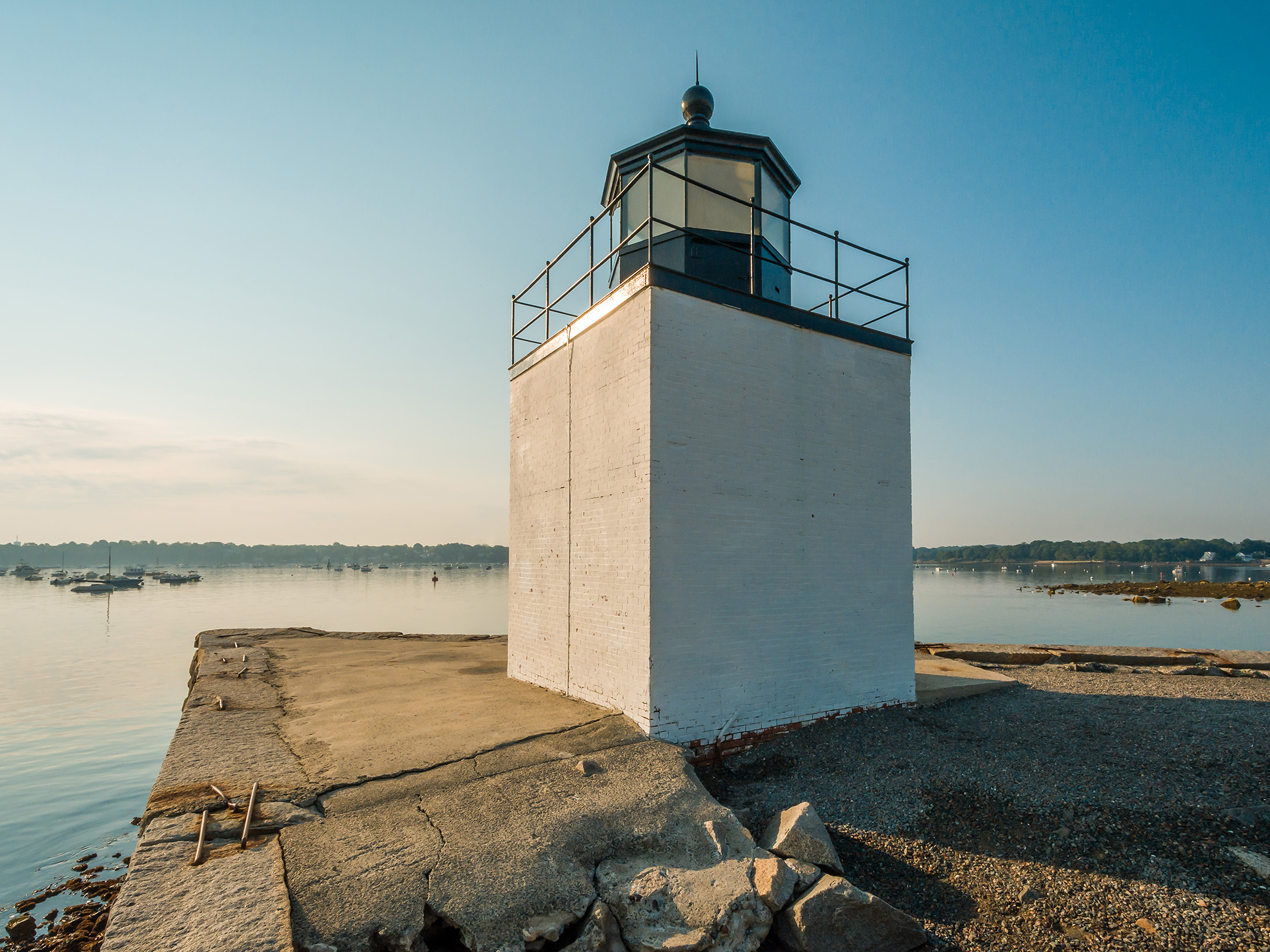
Derby Wharf Light, built in 1871

- 1871
  - Derby Wharf Light built.

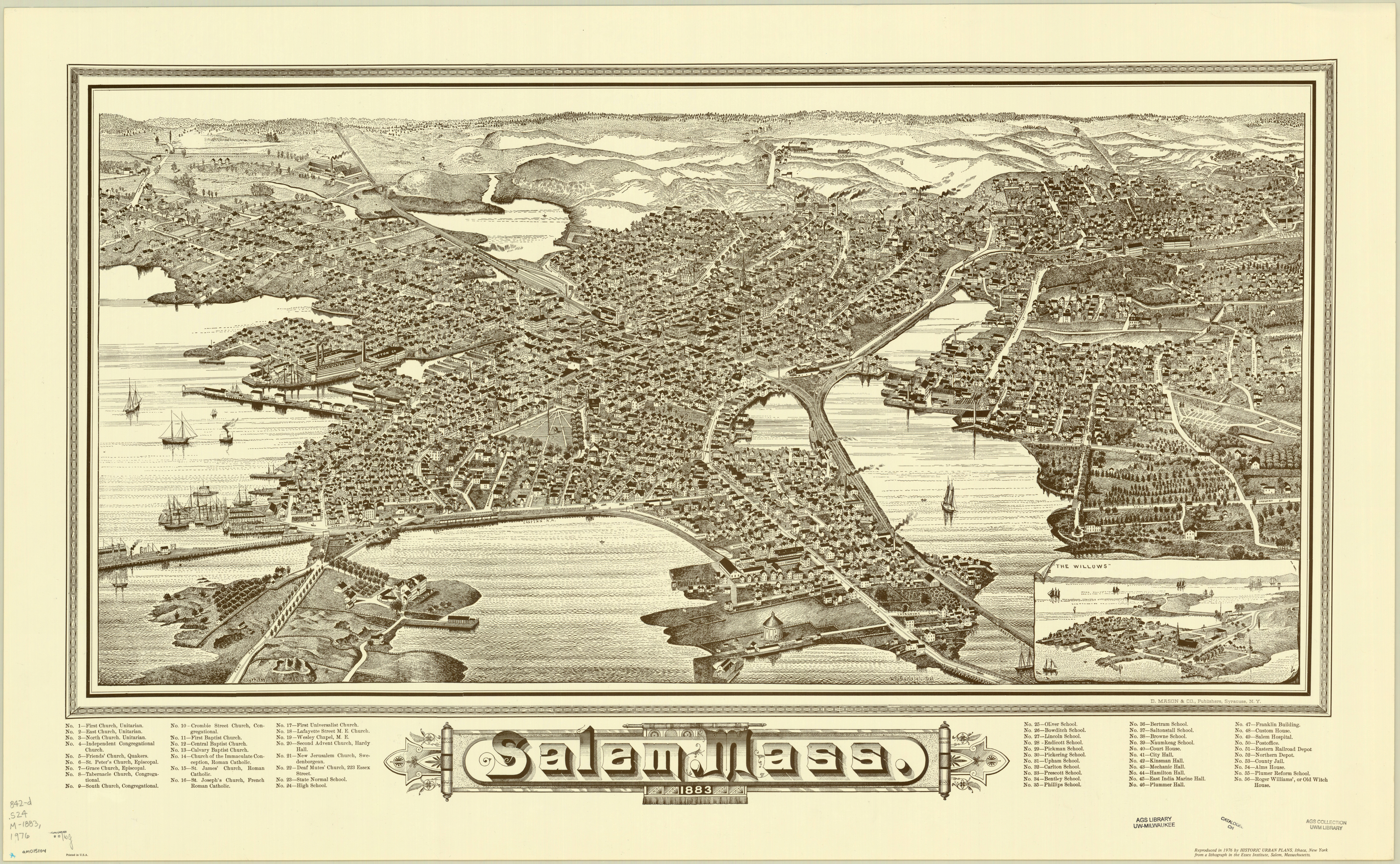
Map of Salem and Harbor, 1883

- 1873
  - A Stunning Victorian is built at 7 Winter Street.
- 1876
  - November: Boston-Salem telephone demonstration.
- 1878
  - Salem Schubert Club organized.
  - By the 1870s, a roundhouse, coaling tower, and water tank were located inside the wye to serve the three lines from the west. The roundhouse was later rebuilt with more stalls and access from the south to serve commuter trains.
- 1880
  - The Salem Evening News was founded and is still in operation today.
- 1881
  - North Street Fire Station is a historic fire station at 142 North Street on the north side and one of the oldest active service fire stations in the United States. Built in 1881 to a design by local architect William Dennis in a brick Queen Anne structure. Today it is the oldest active fire station in Salem, Massachusetts. The North Street Fire Station in Salem, Massachusetts is not the oldest in Massachusetts that title goes to the Central Fire Station (Taunton, Massachusetts) built in 1869, it is the third oldest fire station still in use in the country, and the oldest in the city. It is the oldest *continuously operated* fire station in the country, never having closed for any period of time.

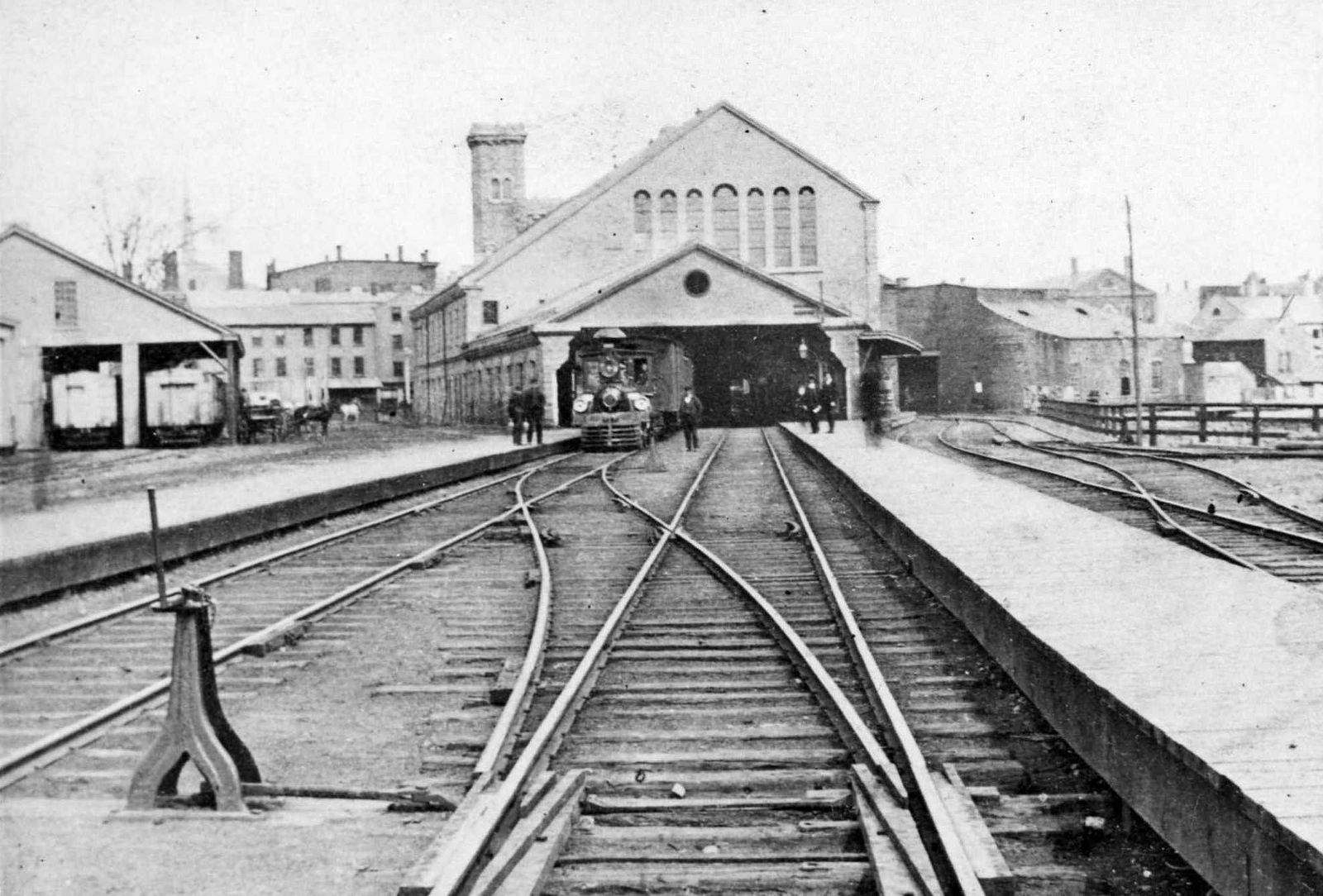
The southern end of the station in the 1880s

- 1882
  - On April 7, 1882, a fire resulting from an explosion of a can of fusees destroyed the wooden trainshed, although the granite facade and towers were intact. A wooden replacement was built around the burnt section. On December 2, 1884, the Eastern was acquired by the B&M. For several decades until the 1930s, Salem was the turnback point for a limited number of short turn trains.
- 1883
  - Parker Brothers was founded by George S. Parker and Frederick Huntington "Fred" Parker in Salem. Parker Brothers is an American toy and game manufacturer and brand.
- 1889
  - Wesley Methodist Church building. It is now in the National Register of Historic Places.

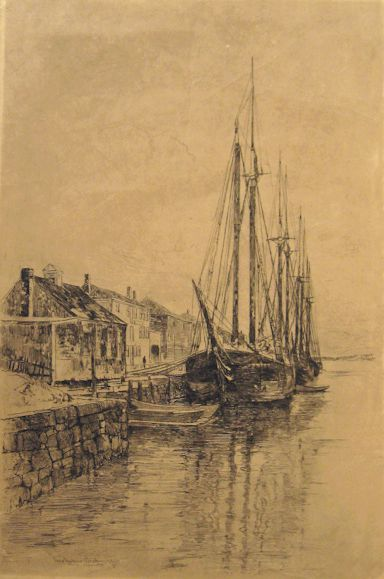
Charles Herbert Woodbury etching, "Derby Wharf, Salem," 21.5 by 15.5 inches, signed lower left," Chas. Herbert Woodbury 89."

- 1894
  - The original Salem Willows Park Pier was built in 1894. A fishing pier that stood until 2021. The pier stood for over 100 years before it was demolished due to deterioration, storm damage & a rising sea level. The pier was rebuilt for five million and opened again in 2024.
- 1897
  - Society of St. Joseph founded.
- 1898
  - YMCA in Salem built at 284–296 Essex Street in the Downtown Salem District.

=== 20th century ===
- 1901
  - St. Nicholas Orthodox Church and Rectory is founded. It is now in the National Register of Historic Places.
- 1903
  - St. John the Baptist Parish founded.
  - The Blake Memorial Chapel is a Gothic Revival-style chapel built in 1905 that features stained glass windows designed by Charles Jay Connick. Connick's work in the chapel showcases his signature style, which was influenced by medieval stained glass and the Arts & Crafts movement.
- 1906
  - Parker Brothers publishes the Rook (card game), which swiftly captured the nation’s attention, becoming the best-selling game in the United States. Renowned for its engaging gameplay, Rook remains the most successful card game in Parker Brothers’ history, continuing to delight players to this day.
  - Salem Laundry building built. It is now on the National Register of Historic Places.
- 1907
  - The Salem Athenaeum's new building, at 337 Essex Street, dedicated. The Athenaeum was founded in 1810 and is one of the oldest private library organizations in the United States. In 1905, the Athenæum sold the building at 132 Essex Street to the Essex Institute (now the Peabody Essex Museum), and constructed its new building.
- 1908
  - Caroline Emmerton bought the Turner-Ingersoll house from the successful Upton family who sold the property after they moved to the Salem Willows neighborhood. today the Upton neighborhood of 1908 is the Salem Willows Historic District. Emerton hired Joseph Everett Chandler as the architect. Caroline O. Emmerton formed the House of Seven Gables Settlement Association & during a two-year restoration with Joseph Everett Chandler built back the exterior to have seven gables like the book. Clifford Pyncheon is Hepzibah's brother and Judge Pyncheon's cousin and for this designed a secret passage from the 1st floor, with a false wall inside a closet off the first floor dining room. The secret staircase goes up two full floors and is cut inside a center chimney to represent part of the book The House of the Seven Gables, Caroline O. Emmerton built a secret staircase inside the House of the Seven Gables as a secret passageway for the character Clifford Pyncheon. Hepzibah Pyncheon has a candy shop on the first floor facing Turner Street in representation with the book. An office for Colonel Pyncheon is on the 2nd floor. The House of the Seven Gables opened to the public in April 1910 and has seen millions of visitors since.
- 1909
  - Registry of Deeds is built at 36 Federal Street. Salem Probate and Family Court wins Build New England.
- 1914
  - Great Salem Fire of 1914
- 1915
  - Peabody Museum of Salem formed.
  - Caterer Edward Cassell dies, aged 84, after a prestigious career as a caterer at Hamilton Hall dating back to at least 1860.

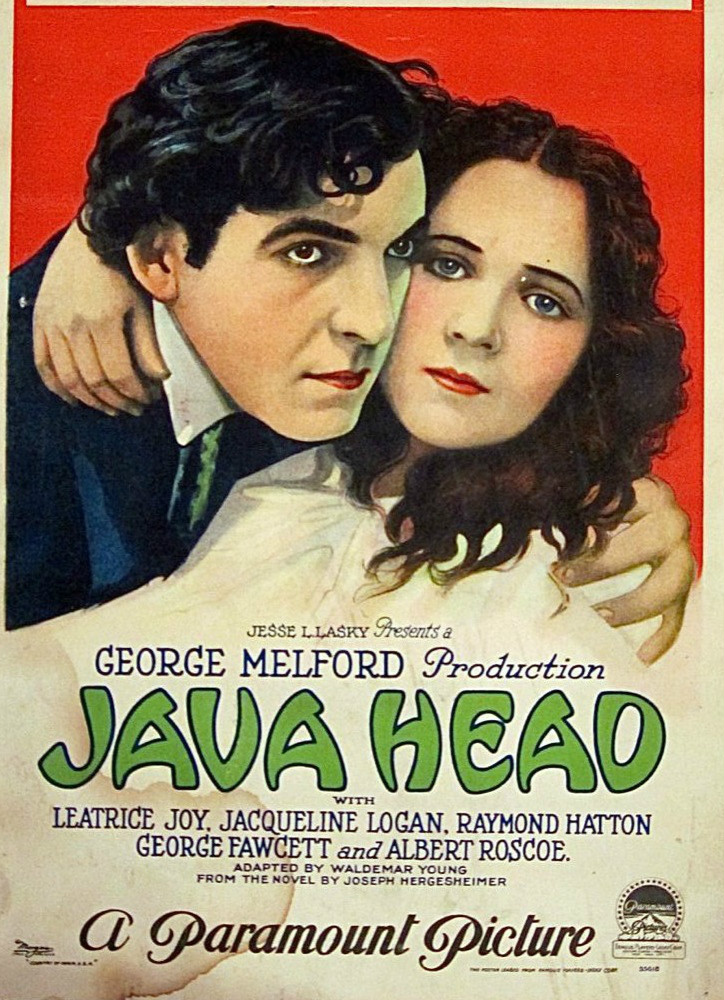
Java Head (1923 film), filmed in Salem.

- 1925
  - Palmer's Cove Yacht Club formed in Salem Harbor. It sponsors the Bowditch Race each August in the harbor.
  - Hawthorne Hotel was open in 1925 and is currently a member of the Historic Hotels of America.
- 1930
  - Pioneer Village, also referred to as Salem 1630: Pioneer Village, stands as a historically significant living history museum meticulously designed to recreate the city of Salem as it existed in the 17th century. Established in June 1930, it holds the distinction of being the first museum of its kind in the United States, setting a precedent for immersive historical interpretation. This innovative institution offers a nuanced exploration of early colonial life, showcasing the material culture, architecture, and customs of the period

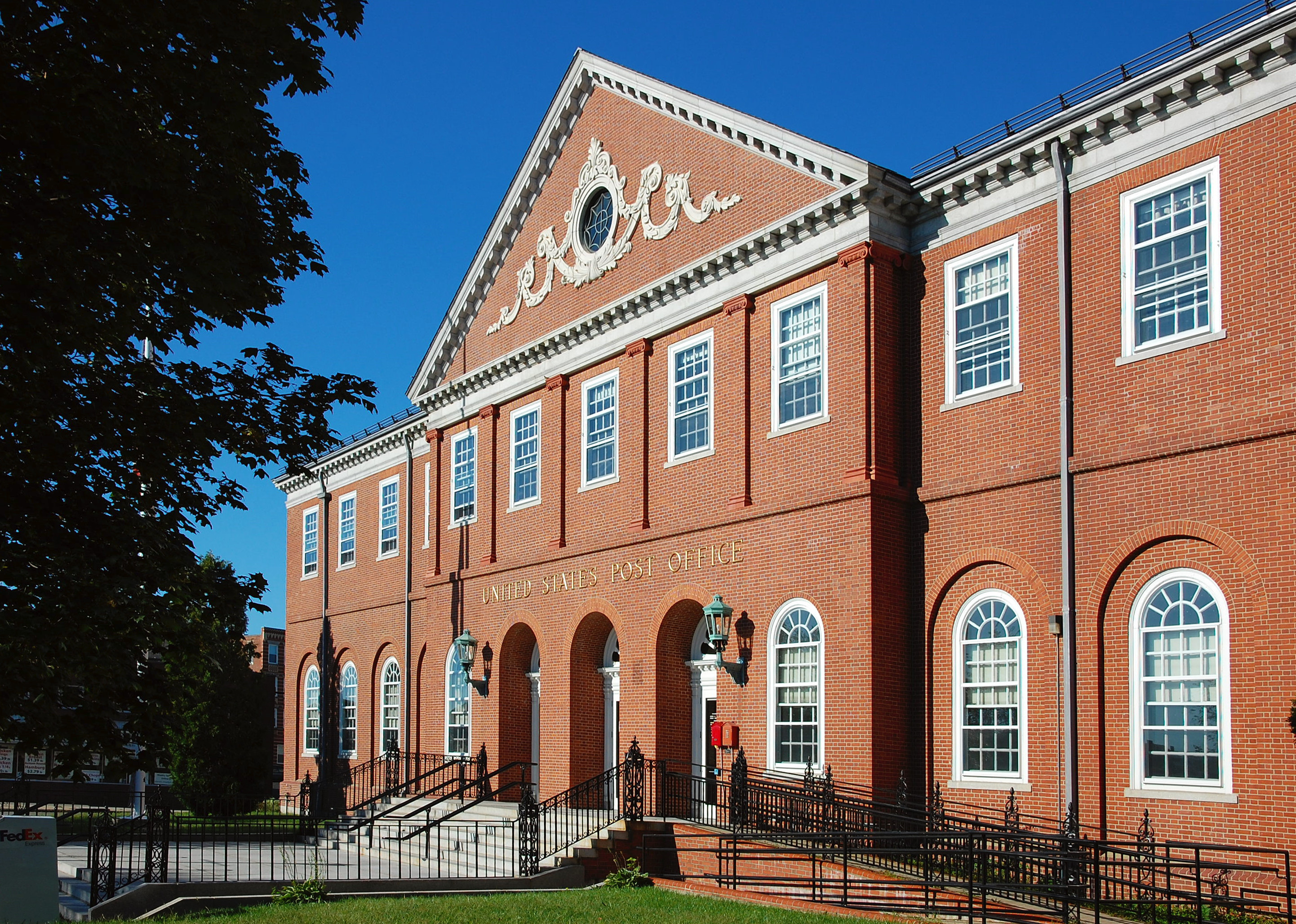
US Post Office in Salem

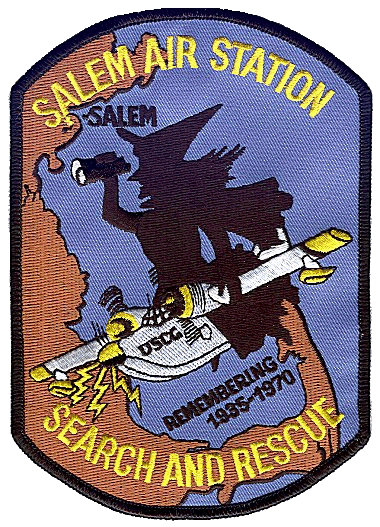
Coast Guard Air Station Salem patch

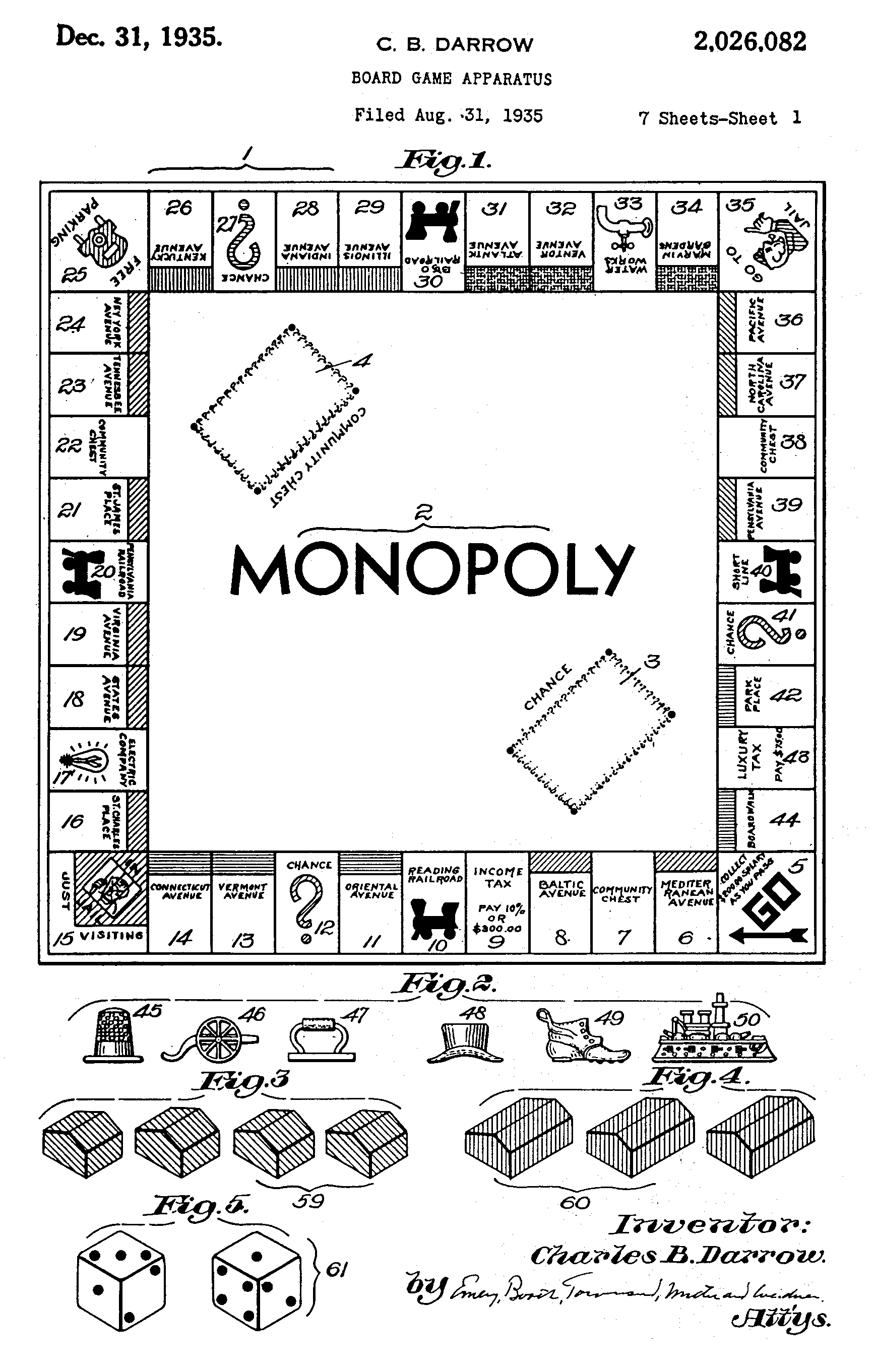
First page of Charles Darrow's patent submission for Monopoly, submitted and granted in 1935

- 1932
  - The Salem Post Office built at 2 Margin Street in downtown Salem.
- 1933
  - Salem Willows Yacht Club is incorporated.Home. It provides clubhouse facilities, dock, launch service, gas pump and dinghy storage.
  - Wildcat Strike by workers at the Pequot Mill.
  - Derby Wharf Light is wired for electricity.
- 1935
  - Coast Guard Air Station Salem established Feb.15 by the U.S. Coast Guard on Winter Island as a new seaplane facility because there is no space to expand the Gloucester Air Station at Ten Pound Island.
  - The Misery Islands in Salem Sound established as a nature reserve managed by the Trustees of Reservations.
  - Parker Brothers publishes the board game Monopoly. Monopoly, which evolved in the public domain before its commercialization, has seen many variants. The game is licensed in 103 countries and printed in 37 languages.
- 1938
  - Salem Maritime National Historic Site, now managed by the National Park Service was created (Match 17), a 9-acre park, the first National Historic Site in the United States.
  - 1939 to 1945 Winter Island was used to protect the East Coast of the United States, from New York City to the USA Canada border.
- 1944
  - Coast Guard Air Station Salem officially designated as the first Air-Sea Rescue station on the eastern seaboard. The Martin PBM Mariner, a hold-over from the war, became the primary rescue aircraft. In the mid-1950s helicopters came as did Grumman HU-16 Albatross amphibious flying boats (UFs).
- 1956
  - Formation of the Salem Redevelopment Authority.
- 1958
  - The B&M extended the Salem tunnel to the south, and soon after built a station in the southern approach span. However, the station lacked modern elements like parking capacity and elevators to make the below-ground-level platforms handicapped accessible. In 1987, the MBTA abandoned the station and built the present station at the north end of the tunnel. The 1959 station building remains at 89 Margin Street; it has been converted into a private school. The platforms remain extant in the tunnel approach, as do rusted pieces of staircases from Mill Street and a pedestrian overpass behind the station building.
- 1964
  - Hawthorne Cove Marina was developed to create a 110-slip facility on Salem Harbor, strategically positioned near the Salem ferry terminal. This marina serves as a vital hub for maritime activity, providing convenient access to the harbor while enhancing the area's infrastructure and supporting recreational boating. Its design and location offer both functional utility and a scenic waterfront experience.
- 1965
  - The Nathaniel Bowditch House declared a National Historic Landmark.
  - By this time, urban renewal – a growing trend of redeveloping economically blighted areas in cities – had destroyed 87 buildings and displaced 160 families when Ada Louise Huxtable ran a feature in The New York Times titled "Urban Renewal Threatens Historic Buildings in Salem, Mass." The article was credited a decade later with spotlighting the loss of history in downtown Salem and the turning around and redeveloping of Salem's downtown core.
- 1968
  - John Ward House added to the National Register of Historic Places.
  - Peirce-Nichols House made a National Historic Landmark.
- 1969
  - Fort Pickering Light, also known as Winter Island Light, built in 1871, discontinued by the Coast Guard.
  - Pickman House restored by Historic Salem and listed in the National Register of Historic Places.
- 1970
  - Hamilton Hall added to the National Register of Historic Places.
  - Coast Guard Air Station Salem moved to Cape Cod.
  - Gardner-Pingree House added to the National Historic Register
  - 30-acre Winter Island park opened to the public.

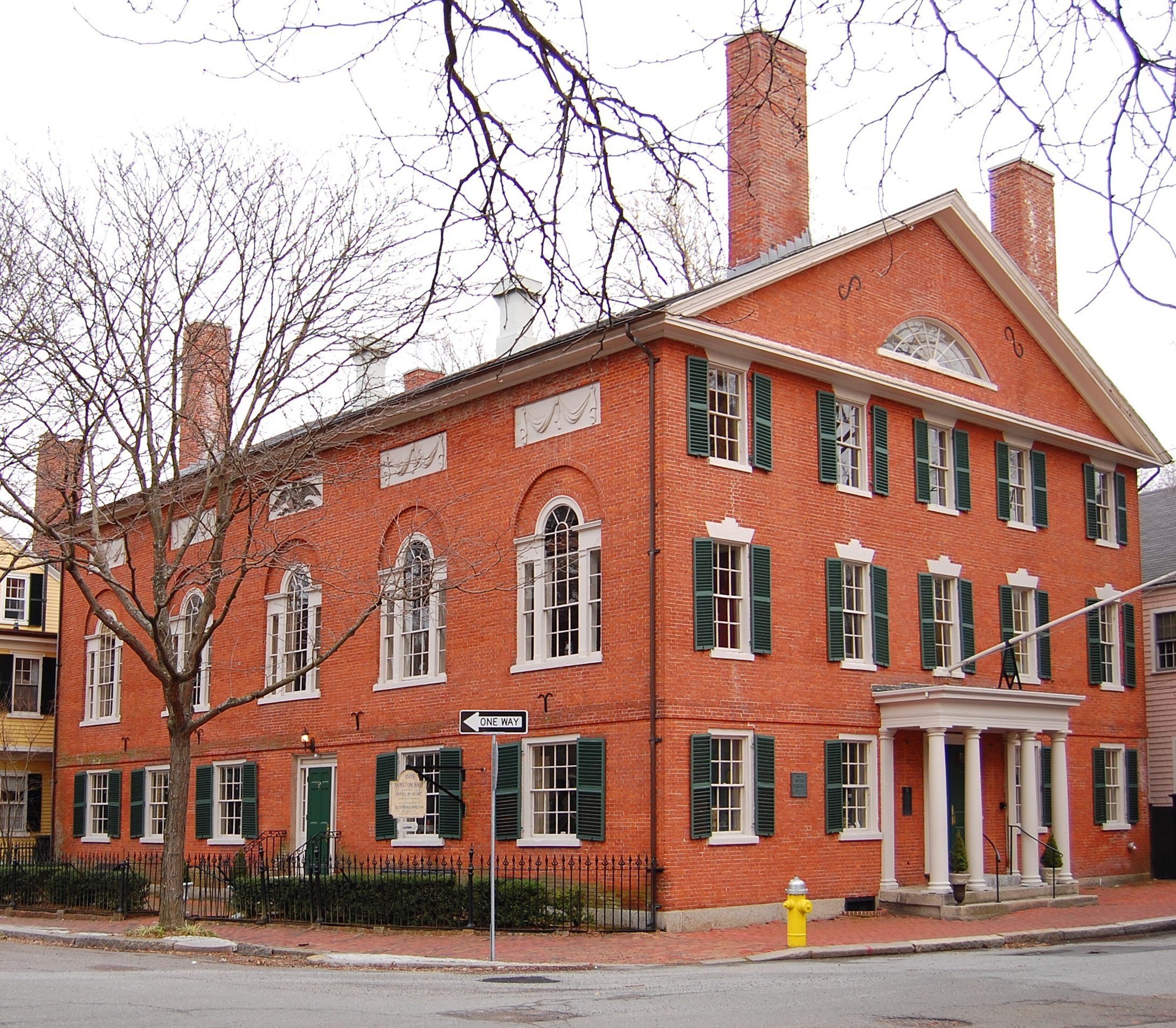
Hamilton Hall at 9 Chestnut Street – added to the National Register of Historic Places in 1970 & built in 1805 by Samuel McIntire -

  - Forced to recognize the cost of urban renewal in downtown Salem, the Salem Redevelopment Authority retools its focus and starts focusing on preservation of the city's history downtown. By this time, 87 buildings had been destroyed, mostly 18th and 19th century homes.
- 1972
  - Old Town Hall Historic District added to the National Register of Historic Places.
  - Essex Institute Historic District added to the National Register of Historic Places.
- 1973
  - Salem City Hall added to the National Register of Historic Places.
  - Joseph Story House, a National Historic Landmark, added to the National Register of Historic Places.
  - Fort Pickering added to the National Register of Historic Places.
- 1974
  - The Gedney and Cox Houses, historic houses at 21 High Street, added to the National Historic Register.
- 1975
  - Thomas March Woodbridge House added to the National Historic Register.
  - Charter Street Historic District added to the National Register of Historic Places.
- 1976
  - Essex County Court Buildings added to the National Register of Historic Places.
  - Bakers Island Light added to the National Register of Historic Places
  - Derby Waterfront District added to the National Register of Historic Places.
  - Salem Common added to the National Register of historic Places.
- 1977
  - Dodge Wing completed at the Peabody Essex Museum
- 1978
  - 'Joshua Ward House added separately to the National Register of Historic Places.
- 1979
  - Salem City Hall was expanded to house city archives.
- 1981
  - Chestnut Street District created. Containing 407 buildings, this is the city's largest district.

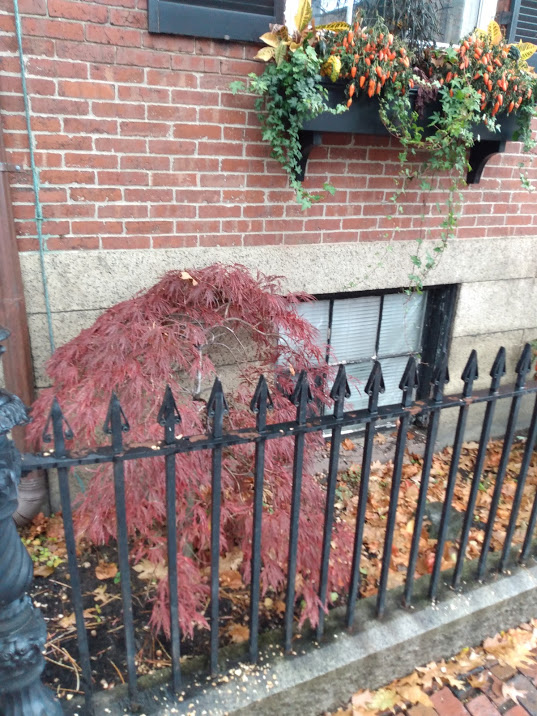
Chestnut Street District brick sidewalk

- 1982
  - Salem Wood carving expert Samuel McIntire, set a world record for Federal furniture when a card table was sold by Sotheby's at auction for $308,000.
  - Rufus Choate House was added to the National Register of Historic Places, a three-story Federal style wood-frame house that was built in 1805 by Ebenezer Beckford, a Salem merchant and real estate developer.

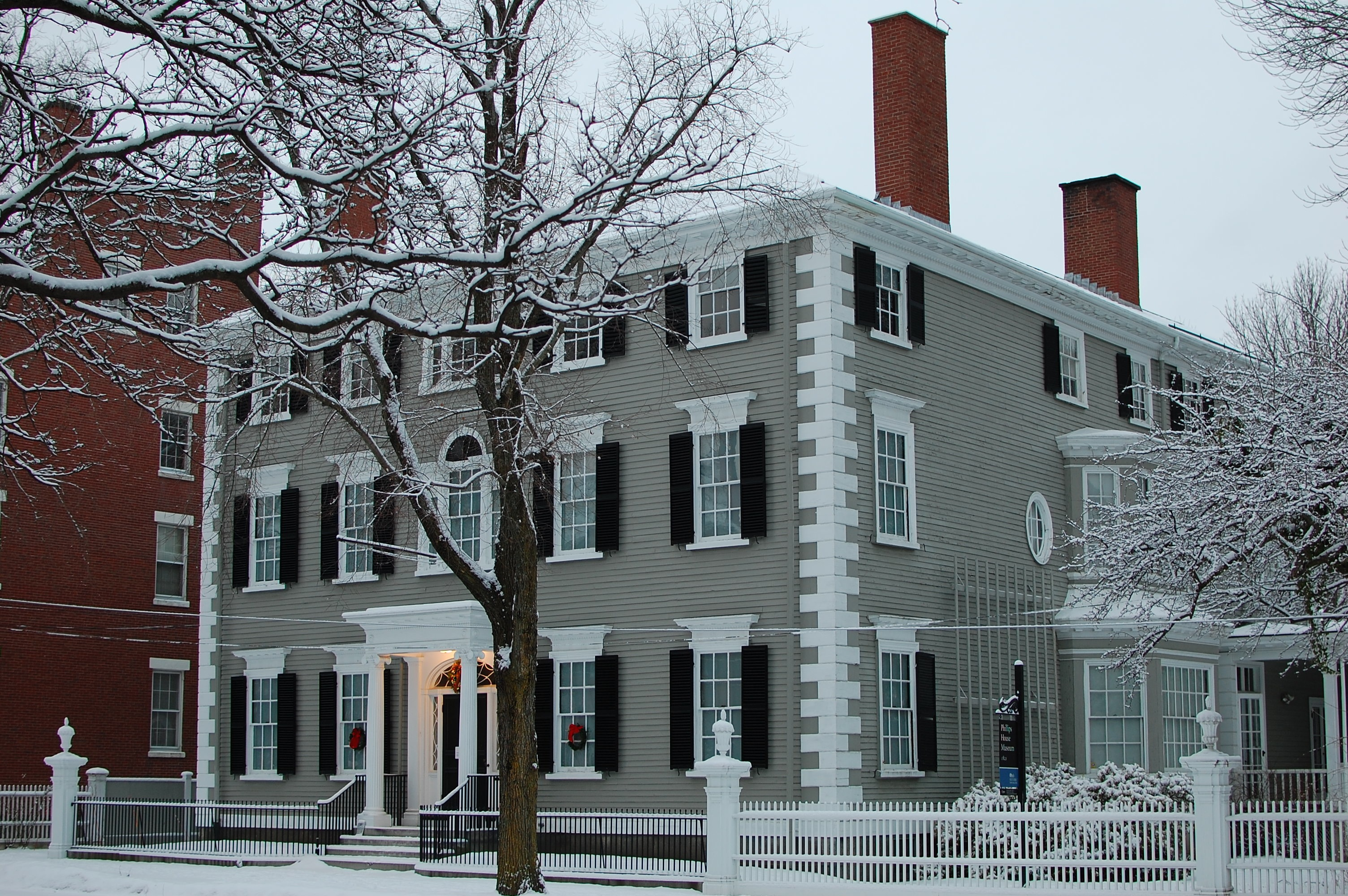
Phillips House at 34 Chestnut Street added to the National Register of Historic Places in 1983 built in 1800 by Samuel McIntire -

- 1983
  - Fort Pickering Light was relit as a private aid to navigation by the City of Salem in 1983.
  - John P. Peabody House is a historic house at 15 Summer Street was added to the National Register of Historic Places.
  - Stephen Phillips House was added to the National Register of Historic Places in 1983 & is now owned and operated as a historic house museum by Historic New England and is open for public tours.
  - West Cogswell House, a historic set of row houses located at 5–9 Summer Street and was added to the National Register of Historic Places.
  - Wesley Methodist Church was added to the National Register of Historic Places.
  - Downtown Salem District was added to the National Register of Historic Places.
  - Crombie Street District was added to the National Register of Historic Places.
  - Shepard Block, located at 298–304 Essex Street and added to the National Register of Historic Places.
  - First Universalist Church is added to the National Register of Historic Places.
  - Salem Laundry was added to the National Register of Historic Places.
  - YMCA is Salem is added to the National Register of Historic Places
  - Bessie Monroe House was added to the National Register of Historic Places
  - Bowker Place was added to the National Register of Historic Places
  - Federal Street District features Early Republic and Late Victorian architecture and was added to the National Register of Historic Places.
  - Parker Brothers in Salem, Massachusetts spent US$15 million establishing a book publishing branch; their first titles featured the American Greetings franchises, Care Bears and Strawberry Shortcake. The branch published twelve titles by February 1984; sales of these books totalled 3.5 million units. Parker Brothers also operated a record label around the same time; one of its releases, based on Coleco's Cabbage Patch Kids and involving Tom and Stephen Chapin, was certified Gold by the Recording Industry Association of America (RIAA) in July 1984.

1984

- The entire area of Winter Island was added to the National Register of Historic Places as Winter Island Historic District and Archeological District
- 1986
  - The Salem Post Office is added to the National Register of Historic Places.
- 1987
- Derby Wharf Light Station is added to the National Register of Historic Places.

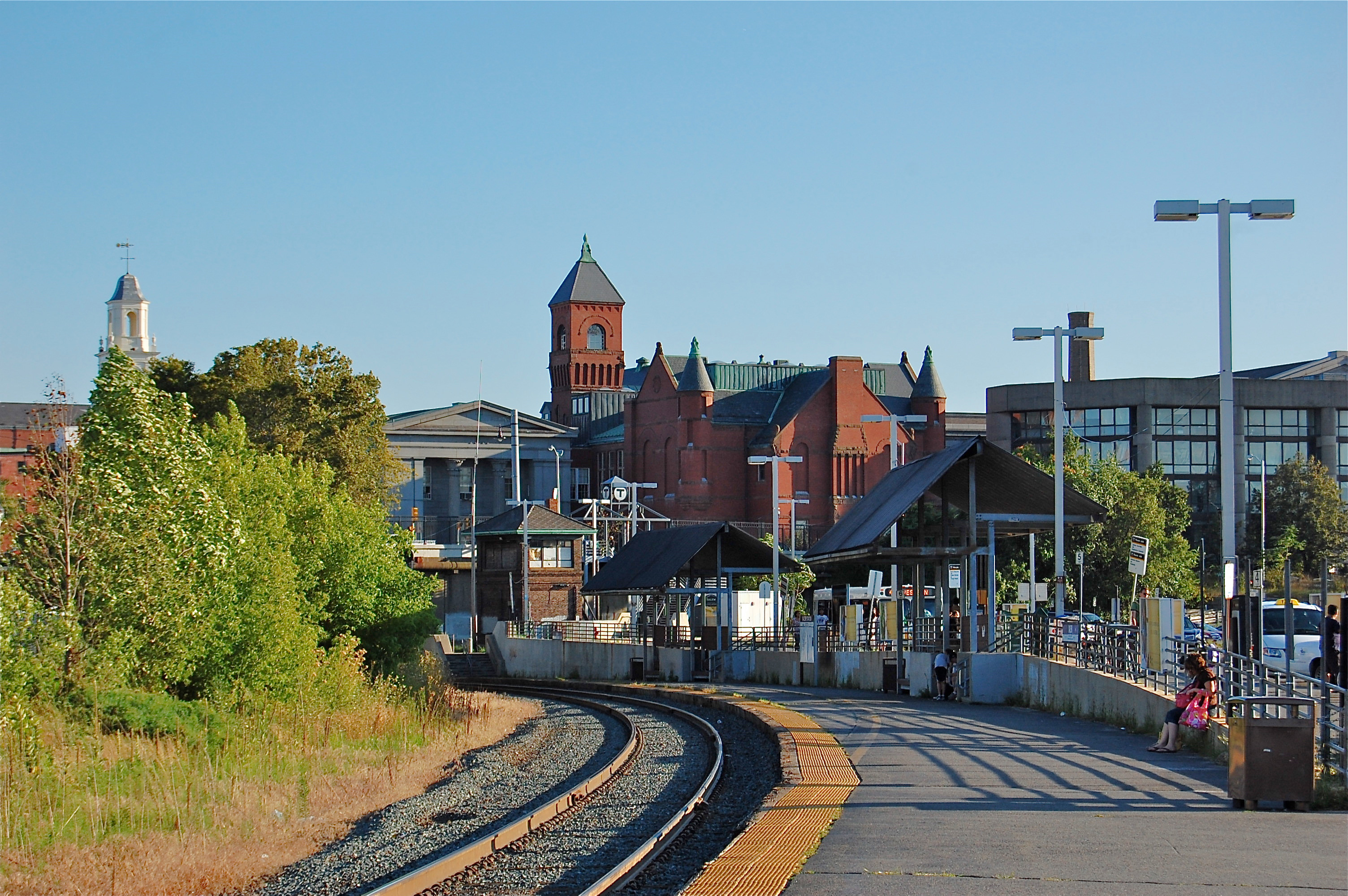
1987-built station viewed in 2010

- 1988
- Salem held its first annual Salem Maritime Festival the Salem Maritime National Historic Site
- 1990
  - William Murray House was added to the National Register of Historic Places.
- 1991
  - Sister city relationship established with Ōta, Tokyo, Japan.
- 1992
  - Peabody Essex Museum was formed by mergeding with the Essex Institute to form the Peabody Essex Museum. Included in the merger was the legacy of the East India Marine Society, established in 1799 by a group of Salem-based ship captains.
- Phillips Library established.
- 1994
  - Winter Island Light is a constituent part of the Winter Island Historic District and Archeological District, which was added to the National Register of Historic Places on April 14, 1994, reference number 94000335.
  - Fort Lee was added to the National Register of Historic Places.
  - Salem Willows Historic District was added to the National Register of Historic Places.
  - St. Nicholas Orthodox Church and Rectory is added to the National Register of Historic Places.
- 1997
  - Construction of the rigging shed (80-by-16-foot wooden building) at the Salem Maritime National Historic Site, a carpentry workshop and storage space since for The Friendship.
- 1999
  - The Salem Diner was added to the National Register of Historic Places.

=== 21st century ===
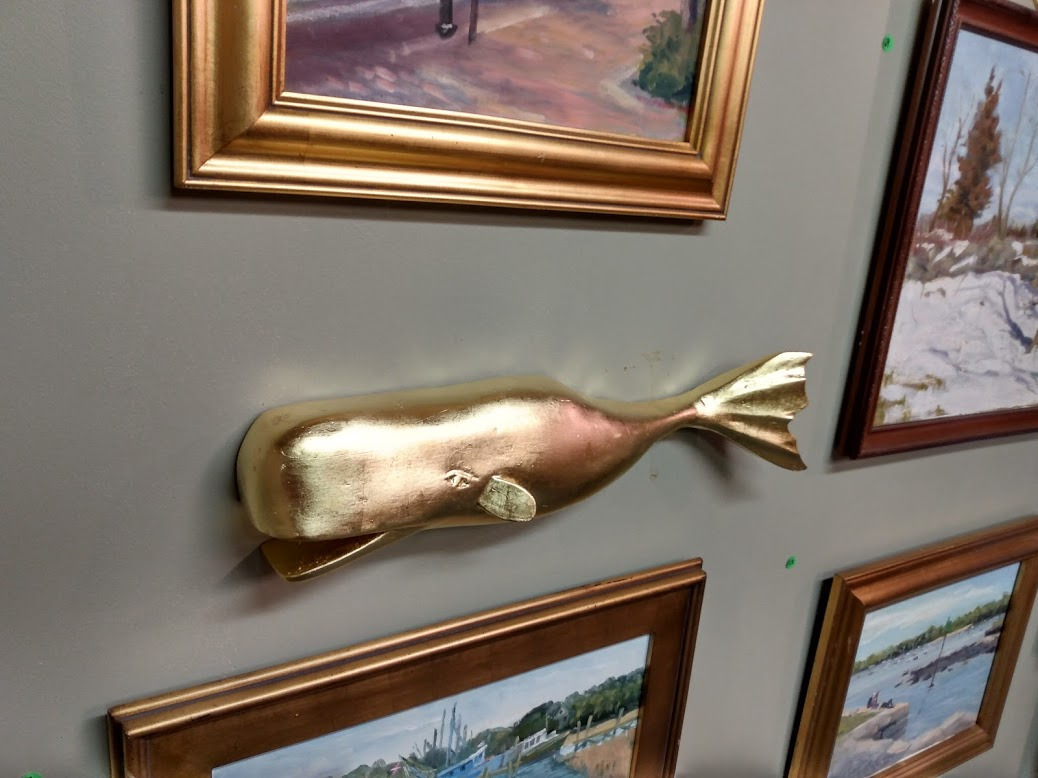

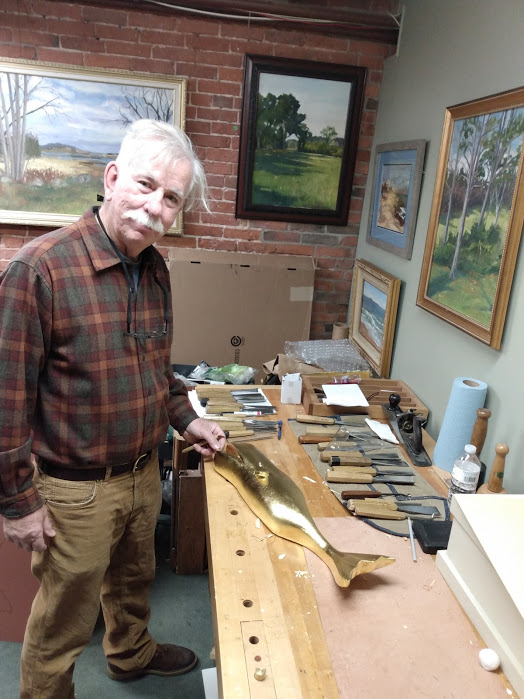

- 2000
  - Friendship of Salem is a 171-foot replica of a 1797 East Indiaman, built in the Scarano Brothers Shipyard in Albany, New York, in 2000. The ship usually functions as a stationary museum during most of the year, however the ship is a fully functioning United States Coast Guard certified vessel capable of passenger and crew voyages, and will set sail during various times of the year. The first American National Historic Site is run by the National Park Service at the Salem Maritime National Historic Site where the Friendship of Salem is docked.

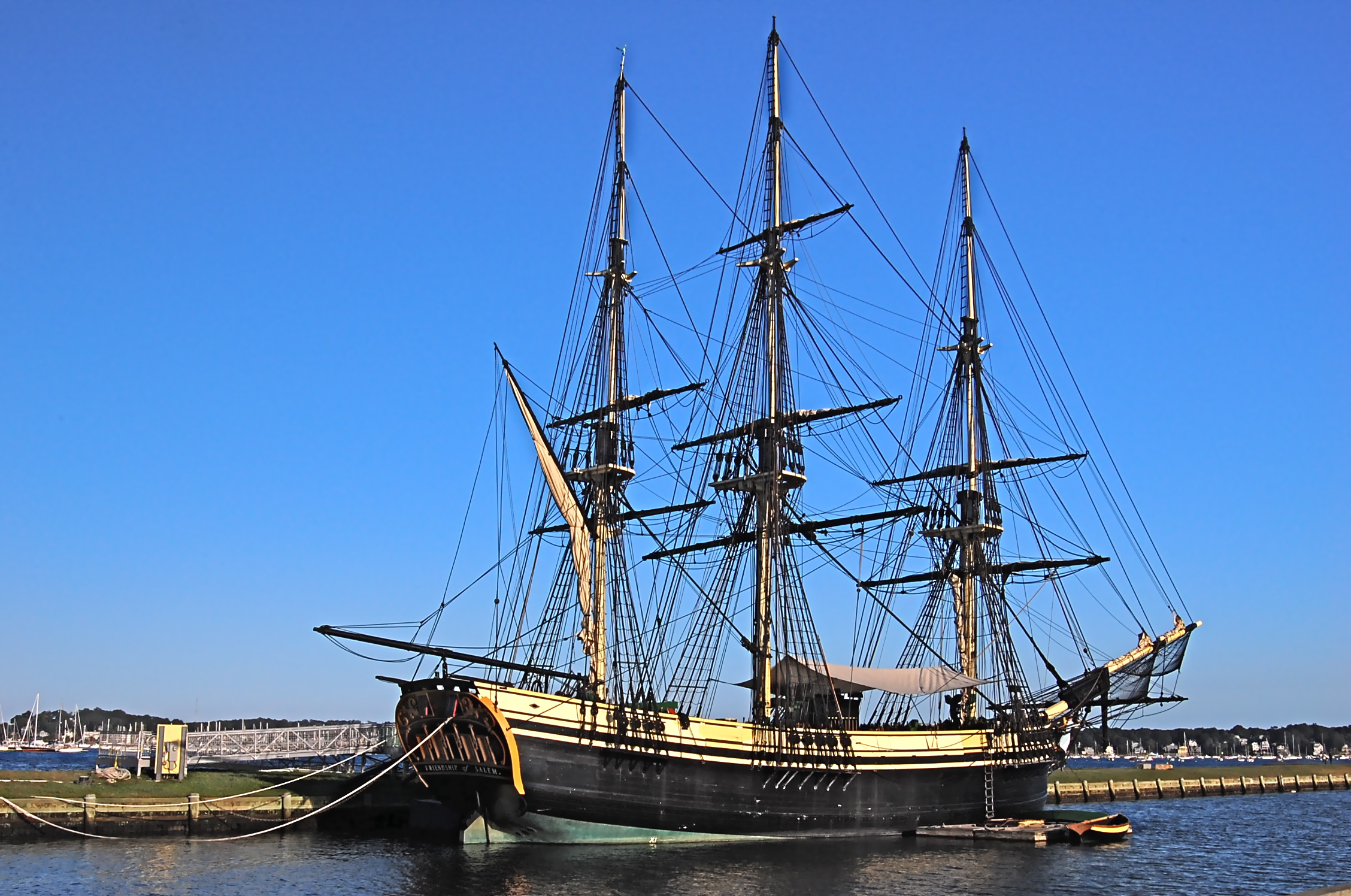
Friendship of Salem at the Salem Maritime National Historic Site.

- 2001
  - Pickering Wharf Marina opens as a full-service marina in Salem Harbor.
  - Salem Water Taxi is founded in Salem Harbor.
- 2002
  - Bridge Street Neck Historic District was added to the National Register of Historic Places.
- 2003
  - The National Park Service acquired the Pedrick Store House from the town of Marblehead, this 1770 warehouse was built in Marblehead, just across the harbor from Salem, in 1770 by Thomas Pedrick, a successful member of the merchant community in pre-Revolutionary War Marblehead.
  - The original Fame was a fast Chebacco fishing schooner that was reborn as a privateer when war broke out in the summer of 1812. She was arguably the first American privateer to bring home a prize, and she made 20 more captures before being wrecked in the Bay of Fundy in 1814. The new Fame is a full-scale replica of this famous schooner. Framed and planked of white oak and trunnel-fastened in the traditional manner, the replica of Fame was launched in 2003. She is now based at the Salem Maritime National Historic Site at Pickering Wharf Marina, where she takes the paying public for cruises on historic Salem Sound.
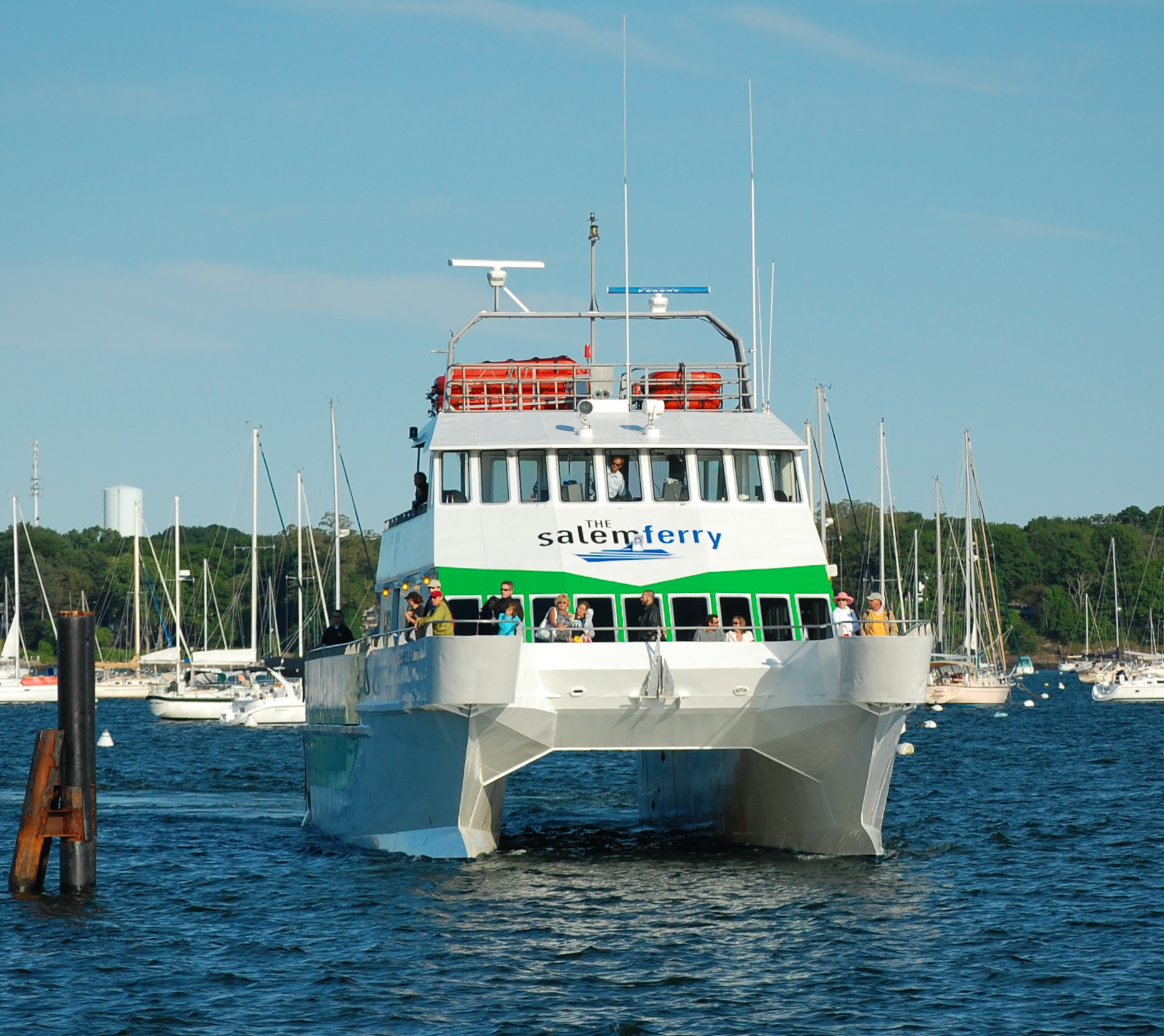
    In celebration of Nathaniel Bowditch and his work writing the New American Practical Navigator, first published in 1802, is still carried on board every commissioned U.S. Naval vessel., in his hometown of Salem, Massachusetts there is the Salem Ferry, named after Bowditch, a high speed catamaran takes people to Boston and is pictured as it is approaching its dock off Blaney Street, Salem Maritime National Historic Site.
  - Pioneer Village underwent a major renovation from 2003 until Spring 2008 when Gordon College (Massachusetts) took over its management along with Old Town Hall An Immersive Salem Witch Trials Experience.

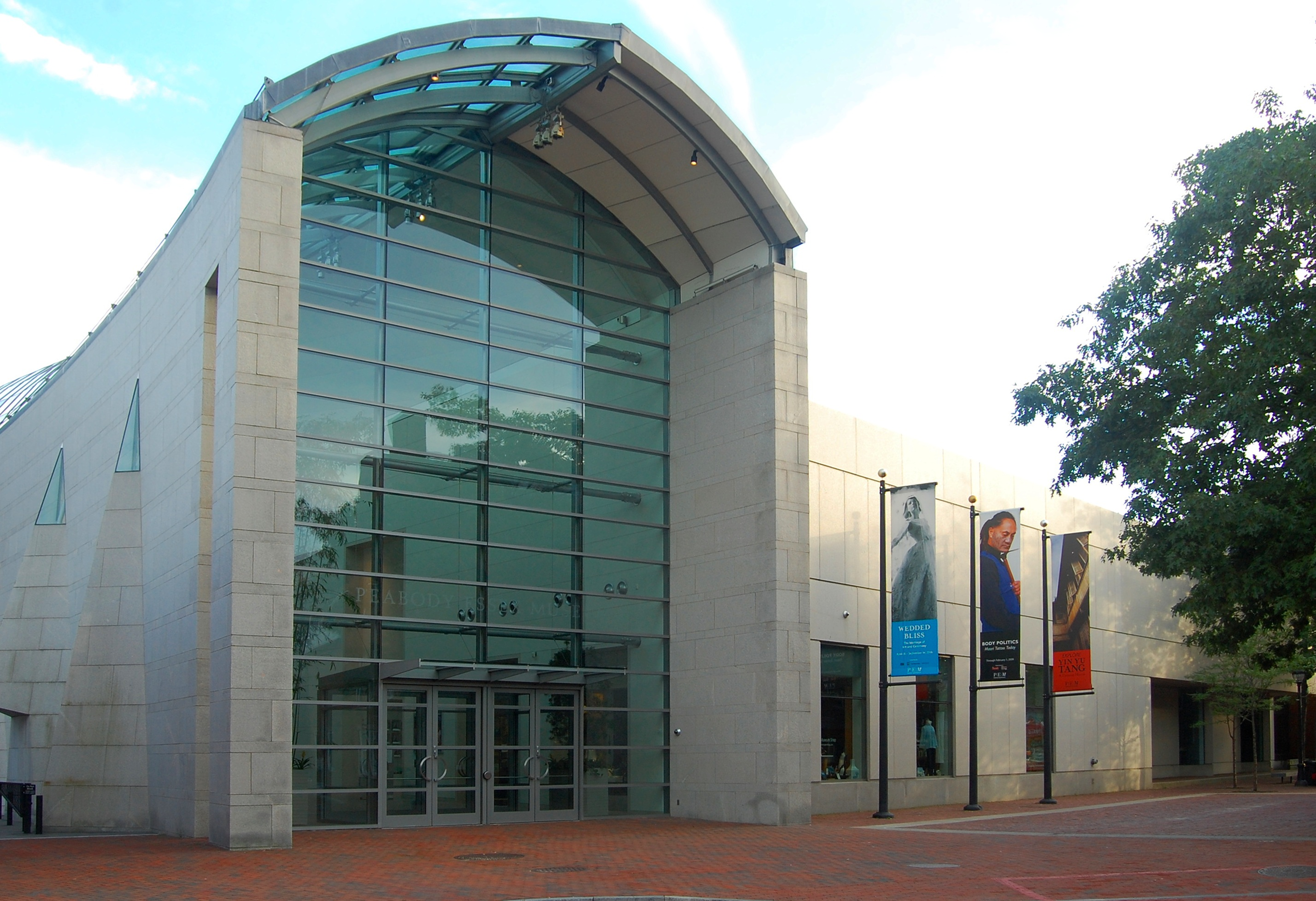
The Peabody Essex Museum

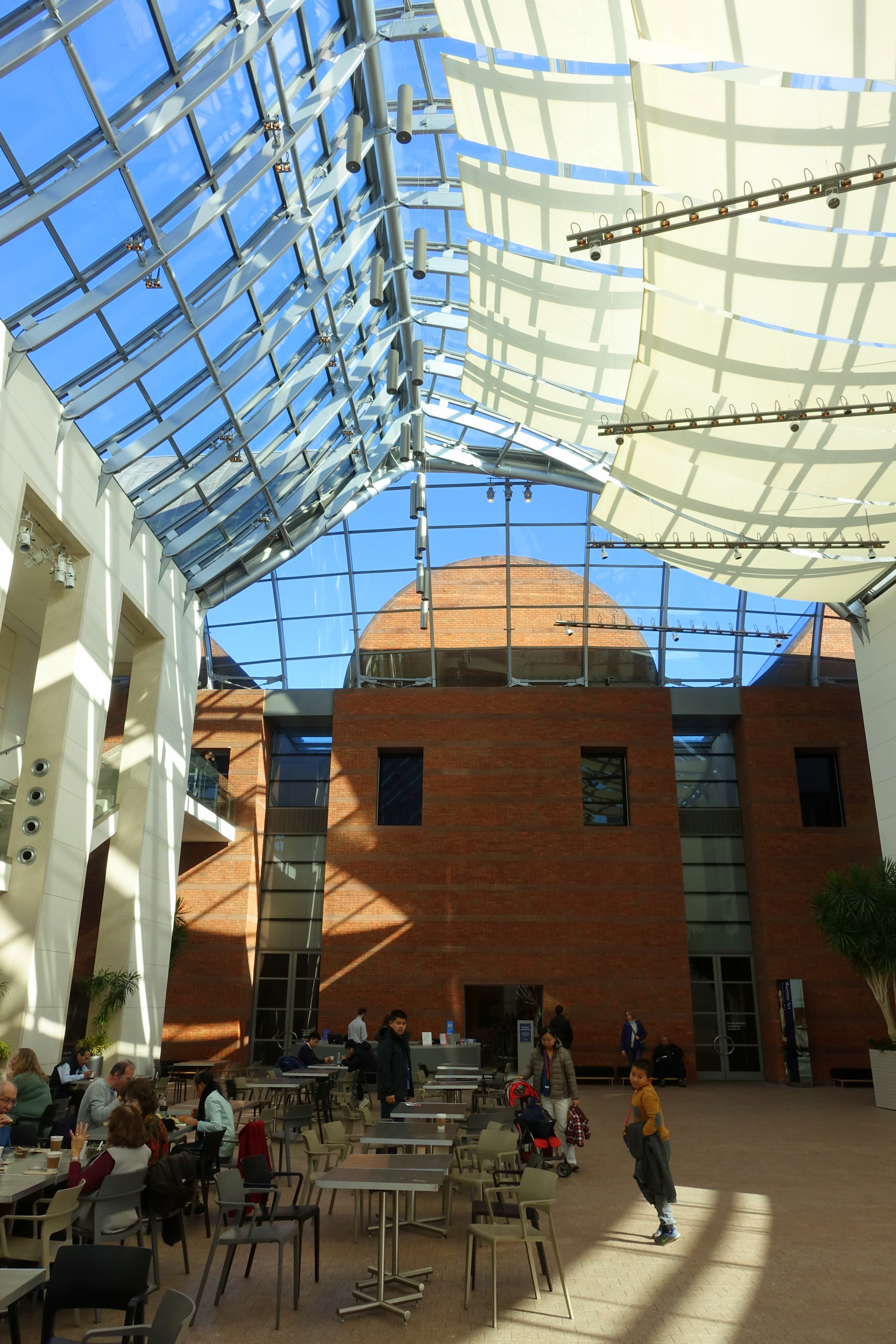
Interior Atrium (architecture) PEM

  - The Peabody Essex Museum completed a massive $100 million renovation and expansion resulting in the opening a new wing designed by Moshe Safdie, more than doubling the gallery space to 250,000 square feet (23,000 m^{2}); this allowed the display of many items from its extensive holdings, which had previously been unknown to the public due to lack of capability to show them. At this time, the museum also opened to the public the Yin Yu Tang House, an early 19th-century Chinese house from Anhui that had been removed from its original village and reconstructed in Salem.
  - Yin Yu Tang House Yin Yu Tang, was built around 1800 in China. Over 200 years after construction the Yin Yu Tang House was disassembled in China, shipped to America and then reassembled in 2003 inside the Peabody Essex Museum.
- 2005
  - A homeless shelter opens in downtown Salem, operated by a NGO Lifebridge. as a result of the Catholic Archdiocese of Boston sex abuse scandal, a church is sold off and turned into a homeless shelter. The Archdiocese of Boston closed the parish in 2003, according to Historic Salem Inc. "In 2005, the Salem Mission bought the closed St. Mary's Italian Church on Margin Street from the Archdiocese of Boston,"
- 2006
  - Kimberley Driscoll becomes mayor.
  - The Salem Ferry a 92-foot (28 m) high-speed catamaran that travels from Salem to Boston in 50 minutes from May to October and had its maiden voyage on June 22, 2006.
  - Waterfront redevelopment – The first step in the redevelopment was in 2006, when the State of Massachusetts gave Salem $1,000,000. The bulk of the money – $750,000 – was earmarked for acquisition of the Blaney Street landing, the private, 2-acre (8,100 m^{2}) site off Derby Street used by the ferry. Another $200,000 was approved for the design of the new Salem wharf, a large pier planned for the landing, which officials said could be used by small cruise ships, commercial vessels and fishing boats.
- 2007
  - Salem Arts Association incorporated.
  - Doyle Sailmakers expanded into a new 31,000 square foot loft in Salem, Massachusetts
  - The City of Salem launched the Haunted Passport program which offers visitors discounts and benefits from local tourist attractions and retailers from October to April.
  - On March 29, 2007, the House of the Seven Gables Historic District was designated a National Historic Landmark.
  - Pedrick Store House, a three-story building, constructed around 1770, is a historic rigging and sail loft, which the Park Service relocated from Marblehead to Salem in 2007 & construction began in the rebuilding of the Pedrick Store House, which had been in storage for many years disassembled – current location is Derby Wharf at the Salem Maritime National Historic Site.
- 2008
  - Joseph Fenno House-Woman's Friend Society was listed on the National Register of Historic Places on September 17, 2008.
- 2009
  - Start of the Salem Farmers Market, taking place every Thursday – starting in June and going thru to October at Derby Square on Front Street Salem Farmers' Market
- 2010
  - The City of Salem's plans call for a total build-out of the current Blaney Street pier, known as the Salem Wharf project. When finished, the Blaney Street pier will be home to small to medium-sized cruise ships, commercial vessels and the Salem Ferry. This project is fully engineered and permitted.
  - Brewer Yacht Yard Group announced it acquired Hawthorne Cove Marina Salem Harbor Salem resident Russ Vickers has divested ownership of the renowned marina after a tremendous 15 year run, selling the property, along with its associated operations, was acquired by the Brewer Yacht Yard Group for a transaction value exceeding $2.3 million.
  - On July 28, 2010, Governor of Massachusetts Deval Patrick signed into law today a bill that transforms Salem State College into Salem State University. Salem and eight other Massachusetts state colleges have collectively formed a new Massachusetts state university system.
  - Salem Harborwalk opened in July 2010 to celebrate the rebirth of the Salem waterfront as a source of recreation for visitors as well as the local community. The 1,100-foot (340 m) walkway extends from the area of the Salem Fire Station to the Salem Waterfront Hotel.
  - The $57.5 million, 525-student residence hall on Central Campus at Salem State University opened.
- 2011
  - Opening of the $109 million J. Michael Ruane Judicial Centerin Salem, located at 56 Federal Street.
  - A bike program called Salem Spins, that offers bicycles, free of charge, with a fleet of 20 bicycles, split between two hubs, at Salem State University and downtown, near the Hawthorne Hotel.
  - Waterfront redevelopment – construction crews were building a long seawall at the Blaney Street landing, which runs from the edge of the ferry dock back toward Derby Street and along an inner harbor. This is one of the early and key pieces of the Salem Pier, which the city hopes to have completed by 2014 and is the key to eventually bring cruise ships to Salem.
  - A master plan was developed for Winter Island in Salem, with help from the planning and design firm The Cecil Group of Boston and Bioengineering Group of Salem, and the City of Salem paid $45,000 in federal money. In the long term the projected cost to rehabilitate just the barracks is $1.5 million. But in the short term, there are multiple lower-cost items like a proposed $15,000 for a kayak dock or $50,000 to relocate and improve the bathhouse. This is a very important project since Fort Pickering guarded Salem Harbor as far back as the 17th century.
  - In 2011, a mahogany side chair with carving done by Samuel McIntire sold at auction for $662,500. The price set a world record for Federal furniture. McIntyre was one of the first architects in the United States, and his work represents a prime example of early Federal-style architecture. Elias Hasket Derby, Salem's wealthiest merchant and thought to be America's first millionaire, and his wife, Elizabeth Crowninshield, purchased the set of eight chairs from McIntire. Samuel McIntyre's house and workshop were located at 31 Summer Street in what is now the Samuel McIntire Historic District.
- 2012
  - Waterfront redevelopment – In June 2012, the $1.75 million was awarded by the state of Massachusetts and will launch a first phase of dredging and construction of a 100-foot (30 m) extension of the pier; a harborwalk to improve pedestrian access; and other lighting, landscaping and paving improvements. Dredging will allow the city to attract other ferries, excursion vessels and cruise ships of up to 250 feet (76 m).
  - The District, superior courthouses have was emptied and remained so since 2019 when the building was demolished.

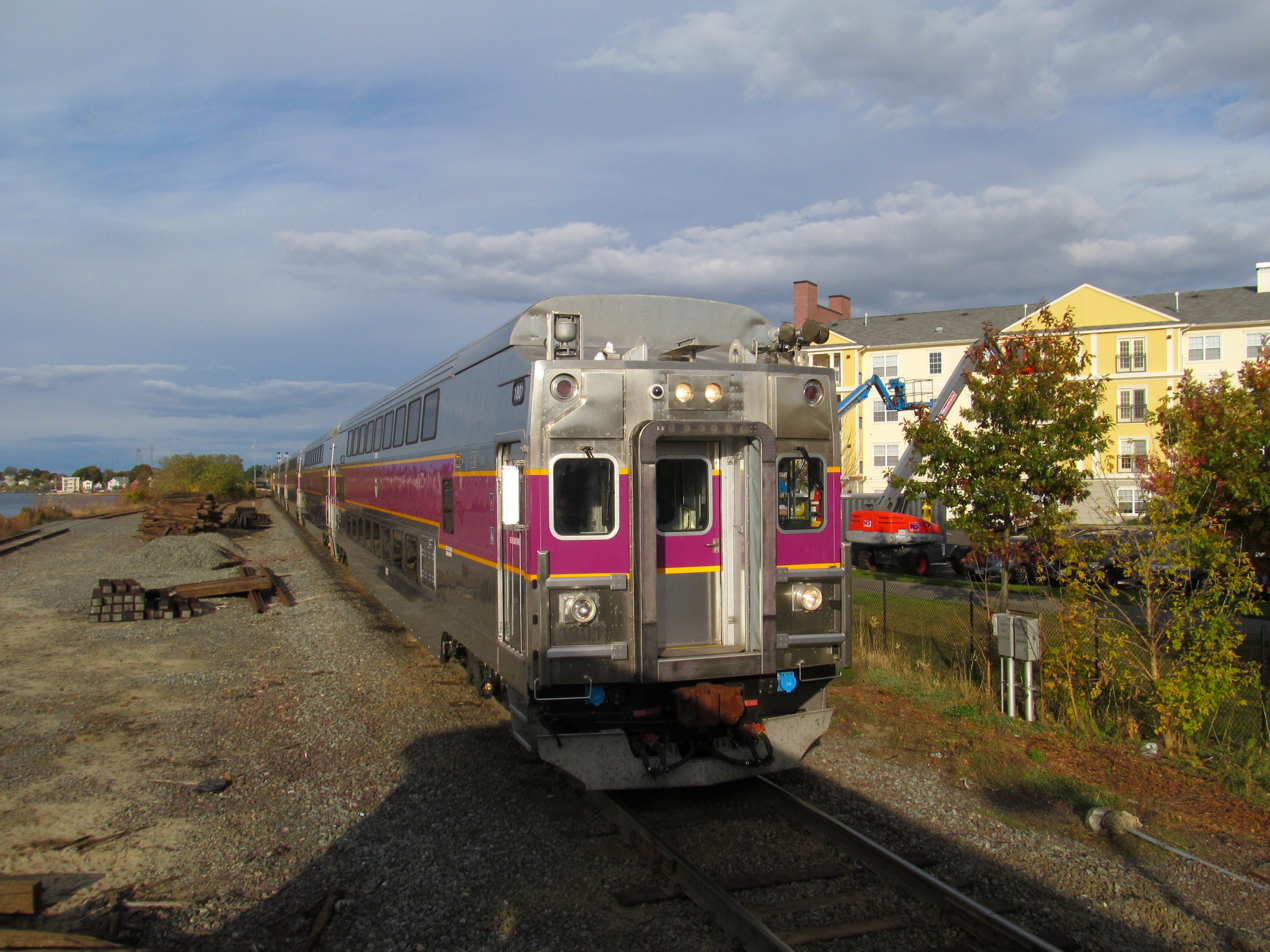
Massachusetts Bay Transportation Authority Bilevel rail car approaching Salem

- 2013
  - President of the United States Barack Obama signed executive order HR1339 "which designates the City of Salem, Massachusetts, as the birthplace of the U.S. National Guard.
  - Salem has eight stations where drivers can charge their electric cars. Four are located at the Museum Place Mall near the Peabody Essex Museum and the other four are in the South Harbor garage across the street from the Salem Waterfront Hotel. The program started in January 2013 and will be free of charge for two years, allowing people to charge their electric cars and other electric vehicles for up to six hours. This program was paid for by a grant from the state of Massachusetts due to Salem's status as a Massachusetts Green Community.
  - Dominick Pangallo was the Salem Chief of Staff for Salem from 2013 until 2023.
  - Salem State University campus – $74 million, 122,000-square-foot library at. The new library will have more than 150 public computers and 1,000 seats of study space, from tables and desks to lounge chairs scattered throughout the building.
  - Salem State University campus – $15 million 40,000-square-foot, two-story, glass-walled facility at the existing athletic O’Keefe Center complex. The new fitness facility will provide—in addition to more exercise equipment, two basketball courts, a yoga studio, and a conference/lecture hall that can accommodate an audience of 1000—a place where students can gather, connect and find a bit of respite from the rigors of their academic studies.
  - Salem State University campus – Construction announcement of a $36 to $42 million Dorn for 350 to 400 students. A construction start in the spring of 2014 is the goal and to have the new residence hall open in 2015.
  - Salem will be getting a new state-of-the-art, 20,000-square-foot Senior Center. In March 2013, The Salem Senior Center was finalized in March 2013 by the Mayor of Salem & the Salem city councilors it is official with a $4.9 million bond – the final OK needed to build a community/senior center as part of a private/public development at Boston and Bridge streets. The Salem Senior Center will include parking for 374 automobiles.
  - Restoration of the deteriorating brick facade, sealed masonry cracks, and repaired historic custom window sashes to safeguard the 145-year-old landmark North Street Fire Station (built 1881)
- 2014
  - The Coal-Fired Power Plant is Decommissioned, paving the way for a total transformation of the harbor in Salem. A key driver was the Obama administration’s environmental policies, particularly the EPA’s Transport Rule (2015–2017), which imposed strict ozone and pollution controls, rendering coal plants like Salem Harbor uneconomical without costly upgrades.
  - In October 2014, the much anticipated Salem MBTA Parking Garage opened."This project has been 20 years in the making," said Mayor Kim Driscoll. "I was an intern in the planning department, this would've been 1988 ... people were talking about it then. Seriously, that long ago. That's a long time ago." The 714-space garage, built on a former MBTA parking lot, is just one part of the $44 million project to remake the station that began in July 2013. The 714-space garage, built on a former MBTA parking lot, is just one part of the $44 million project to remake the station that began in July 2013 "This project has been 20 years in the making," said Mayor Kim Driscoll. "I was an intern in the planning department, this would've been late 1988.

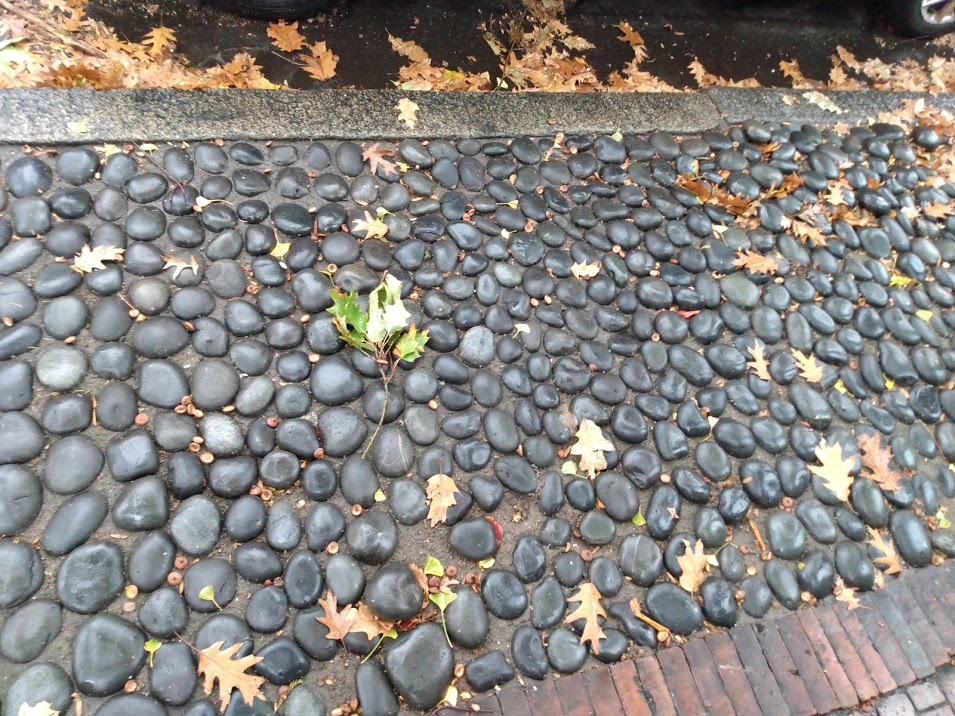
(river stones with the brick sidewalk) Chestnut Street, In 1981 the City of Salem named its largest historic district after Samuel McIntire. Encompassing Broad, Chestnut, Essex, Federal and connecting streets. Chestnut Street is one of the oldest planned streets in America. Initially laid out in 1796, and then widened in 1803 to 80-feet

- 2015
  - Footprint Power cleared the last major hurdle on its way to building a $1 billion natural gas-fired plant on Salem Harbor.
  - In June, officials hold groundbreaking for Salem's $1B Footprint power plant.
  - Tourists from all over the world make up the over one million people visit Salem annually, and bring in over $100 million annually in tourism spending.
  - Joshua Ward House, a historic Federal style brick house, built in 1784 and interior woodwoork was done by noted Salem builder and woodworker Samuel McIntire is turned into an 11-room boutique Hotel. The building is owned by Salem residents Kimberly and Todd Waller.

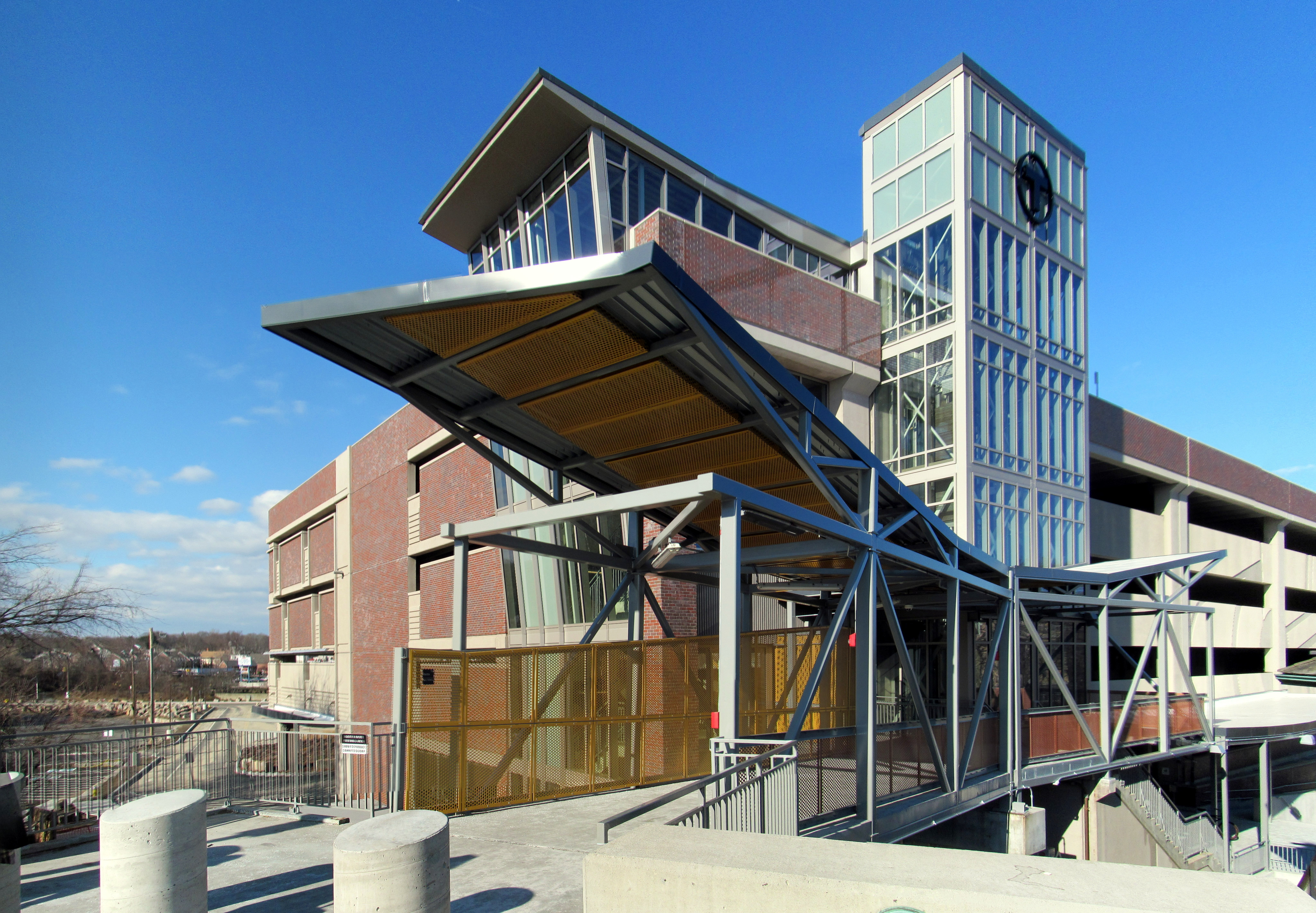
Main entrance to Salem station, January 2016

- 2016
  - Peabody Essex Museum's $49 million expansion proposal got critical support from the Design Review Board Wednesday night as the project draws closer to breaking ground.
  - Salem Harbor has four stops for 2016 new Salem Water Shuttle: Blaney Street, Congress Street, Salem Willows and Winter Island.
- 2017
  - The Registry of Deeds is proposed to be moved to the old Superior Court and County Commissioner buildings downtown. But the proposal has opposition.
  - After decades as being known as The Plummer Home will change its name to Plummer Youth Promise after decades of being The Plummer Home For Boys.
  - A Boutique 44-room hotel opened on the Essex Street pedestrian mall in downtown, fitted with a gigantic roofdeck restaurant. A street level café opening to Essex street with a ground-floor coffee shop off the hotel's lobby. Even bowling alley is located in this new Boutique Hotel.
  - Salem State University will open its $18 million Sophia Gordon Center for the Creative and Performing Arts on April 2.
  - John Legend was honored by Salem State University with an Advocate For Social Justice Award. Based on his extensive efforts to make a difference in the lives of others, Legend will be the inaugural recipient of the Salem Advocate for Social Justice award, presented by Salem Award Foundation for Human Rights and Social Justice.
  - The City of Salem launched a new and improved bike sharing program with Zagster.
- 2018
  - The City of Salem received a federal grant for $3,400,000 for a second ferry to operate out of Salem Harbor. The grant was provided by the United States Department of Transportation
  - A$50 million development project on the corner of Washington and Dodge Streets to build a 110-Room Hampton Inn City officials estimate a $200,000 boost in new hotel occupancy tax revenues from the project with City Planning Director Tom Daniel said Maine Course Hospitality Group is seeking foundation and building permits for the project, which is being built on property bordering Dodge and Washington streets.
- 2019
  - The comedy film Hubie Halloween was filmed in Salem for Netflix starring Adam Sandler, & directed by Steven Brill. Hubie Halloween filmed in multiple towns on Massachusetts' North Shore, shooting scenes in Beverly, Danvers & Marblehead.) The original screenplay was written by Adam Sandler and Tim Herlihy.
  - Opening of the Peabody Essex Museum's $200 million‘Gallery Expansion Project.’ the PEM opened the 40,000-sq-ft Wing and 13 New Galleries and Exhibitions in September 2019, allocated from the museum's ambitious $650 million Advancement Campaign, launched in 2011.
  - Urban Spaces/Diamond Sinacori Break Ground on Salem Condo Complex is a $20 million project titles 'BRIX' will have 61 Residences and a mix of Retail to Former Courthouse location at 65 Washington Street, a few minute walk to the Salem Commuter Rail Station with train and bus service to Boston.

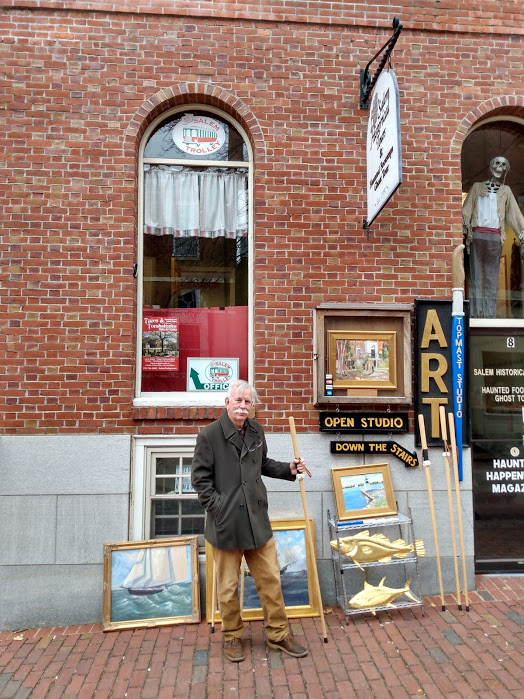
Topmast Studio at the Custom House in Downtown Salem off Essex Street (built, 1805). En plein air artist, Gold leaf & Wood carver John Pydynkowski at his studio

- 2020
  - The City of Salem launches a microtransit network called the Salem Skipper in December 2020. It is an on-demand transit network operated by Via allowing riders to share the same vehicle for approximately the same price as a MBTA bus ticket. Passengers can hail a ride on their mobile device with the Salem Skipper app, or by calling a dispatcher.
- 2021
  - Renovations to Salem's historic courthouse and commissioner's building, as well as plans to add 110 units of housing in an 8-story building next to the Salem MBTA Commuter Rail station were announced. Winn won a bid awarded by the Salem Redevelopment Authority to revitalize and incorporate Salem's historic courthouse buildings in the redevelopment project. Recent documents submitted to the Community Preservation Committee show the entire project – the court buildings, crescent lot, and everything between – will cost more than $63 million to build.
- 2022
  - The Governor of Massachusetts, Charlie Baker, made a statement that $30 million will go to Salem State University to redesign the campus and modernize areas.
  - The House of Seven Gables on Turner Street received a Massachusetts State grant on a coastal resilience plan thanks to the Governor of Massachusetts Charlie Baker. This $509,919 grant "Preserving History: Assessments and Climate Adaptations at the House of Seven Gables".
  - In October 2022 42 acres on the Salem waterfront is sold for $30 million. This is latest milestone toward the development of the state's second major offshore wind port terminal. The Salem Harbor Wind Terminal is a public-private partnership between Crowley and the City of Salem, with AVANGRID serving as the port's anchor tenant for Offshore wind power construction. Commonwealth Wind and Park City Wind projects are the main companies.
  - In November Kim Driscoll the Mayor of Salem won a desk on Beacon Hill as Massachusetts Brand New Lieutenant Governor of Massachusetts. Gov.-elect Maura Healey and Lt. Gov.-elect Kim Driscoll had their inaugural celebration at TD Garden on the evening of January 5, 2023.
- 2023
  - Robert McCarthy, a seasoned leader and three-time City Council president, stepped into the role of acting Mayor of Salem following the resignation of Kim Driscoll. Driscoll vacated the mayoral position to assume her new role as Lieutenant Governor of Massachusetts. Salem Mayor Robert McCarthy was the 51st mayor. Dominick Pangallo was voted in, as 52nd Mayor of Salem on May 16, 2023.
  - Salem welcomed 1.3 million visitors between mid-September and October.
- 2024
  - South Salem station obtained two million dollars in funding to move forward. A pre construction estimate to design & construct is estimated at 25 million for a 2nd station in Salem on the Newburyport/Rockport Line. Situated between Canal Street and Jefferson Avenue with close proximity to Salem State University & Mass General Brigham Salem Hospital. This location is critical because of the 30 acres of underused property that can support transit-oriented development.
  - The City of Salem took up a new anti-camping ordinance aimed at addressing a homeless encampment in the city with a downtown homeless encampment that has been the subject of concern and controversy for the last year has been removed by the city and its police with the Massachusetts State Police.
  - In August, a groundbreaking took place for an offshore wind port on Salem Harbor, the 2nd for the State of Massachusetts. Governor Maura Healey stated "the site will be critical for creating jobs.
  - The Charlotte Forten statue dedication ceremony took place at Charlotte Forten Park, 289 Derby Street. Charlotte Forten Park is dedicated in Downtown Salem., a graduate of the Salem Normal School For Teachers & later in 1856, a teacher at the Epes Grammar School in Salem. The Epes School stands off Aborn St as the oldest wood grammar school building still standing, still occupied. Today it is a modest 4-unit apartment building.
  - State and local leaders cut the ribbon on the newly constructed, at a cost of five million dollars, Salem Willows Fishing Pier on December 2, 2024. Originally constructed in 1894, the pier stood for over 100 years before it was demolished due to deterioration, storm damage, and sea-level rise impacts. The newly rebuilt Salem Willows Fishing Pier will provide access to anglers looking to tangle with striped bass, bluefish, flounder and squid.
- 2025
  - The city has recently secured a prestigious $150,000 state grant, which will facilitate the cultivation of 99 new trees in some of Salem's most vibrant and heavily frequented public spaces.
  - On April 15, 2025, the Salem City Council made substantial strides in tackling homelessness & bolstering public safety. The City Council approved a pivotal revision to regulations governing camping on public property. Designed to elevate health and safety standards while establishing clearer enforcement protocols wigh an ordinance permitting city officials to clear campsites posing public health or safety risks after giving occupants 24 hours' notice, shortening the prior 72-hour notice period to address urgent hazards. The police, health, and building departments will jointly assess campsite safety for a coordinated response.
  - Plummer Youth Promise was awarded 25 million dollars for a new facility to be built at the ( Plummer Home For Boys ). Construction will take place behind the existing structure and will house up to 22 foster youth in single-occupancy bedrooms with private bathrooms. The new building will also include separate spaces for administrative staff, offices, and family visiting accommodations.
- 2026
  - Salem voters approved a $447 million project on May 5, 2026, to fund a new Salem High School building. The funding combines a $208 million state grant from the Massachusetts School Building Authority with a locally approved $232 million debt-exclusion tax override.
- In July 2026, the station closed for a two-month, fast-tracked infrastructure renovation under city contract IFB #26-26-FIR. The project officially concluded with the station's reopening on September 2, 2026. Selective demolition to widen the historic front garage bay doors, enabling modern, larger 21st-century fire apparatus to clear the exterior masonry safely. A complete interior remodel of the living quarters, including new flooring, drop ceilings, updated paint, and energy-efficient climate systems. A big use on volunteer labor with Active Salem firefighters with backgrounds in the building trades volunteered to install epoxy bay flooring, rebuild inner doorways, and fit new kitchen cabinetry to maximize the municipal budget. This followed a previous $130,000 exterior preservation in 2013, which was split equally between city funds and a historic preservation grant to seal masonry cracks and restore custom, historic window sashes.

== See also ==
- Salem history
- List of mayors of Salem, Massachusetts
- Timeline of the Salem witch trials
- Timelines of other municipalities in Essex County, Massachusetts: Gloucester, Haverhill, Lawrence, Lynn, Newburyport

== Bibliography ==
=== Published in the 19th century ===
- Rees, Abraham (1819), "Salem", The Cyclopaedia, London: Longman, Hurst, Rees, Orme & Brown
- Anne Newport Royall (1826). "Salem". Sketches of History, Life, and Manners, in the United States. New Haven: New Haven, Printed for the author. p. 356+.
- Brewster, David, ed. (1830). "Salem". Edinburgh Encyclopædia. Edinburgh: William Blackwood.
- Salem Directory and City Register. Salem, Massachusetts: Henry Whipple. 1842.
- Salem Directory and City Register. Salem, Massachusetts: Henry Whipple. 1846.
- Hayward, John (1849). "Salem". Gazetteer of Massachusetts. Boston: J.P. Jewett & Co. hdl:2027/mdp.39015078325076.
- Adams, George (1857), The Salem directory, Salem, Massachusetts: H. Whipple & Son, OCLC 36779111, OL 23331213M
- "Historical Events of Salem, from its Early Settlements to the Present Time". Historical Collections of the Essex Institute. 15. Salem: Essex Institute. 1878. hdl:2027/nyp.33433081909636.
- T.F. Hunt (1880), Visitor's Guide to Salem, Salem, Massachusetts: H.P. Ives, OCLC 10361879, OL 6931666M
- Pocket Guide to Salem, Massachusetts. Salem: H.P. Ives. 1885.
- Salem Directory. Boston: Sampson, Murdock & Co. 1886.
- Whipple, George M. (1886). "A sketch of the musical societies of Salem". Essex Institute Historical Collections. 23.

=== Published in the 20th century ===
- "Salem". Chambers's Encyclopaedia. London. 1901.
- Arrington, Benjamin F., ed. (1922). "City of Salem". Municipal History of Essex County in Massachusetts. Vol. 1. New York: Lewis Historical Publishing Company. hdl:2027/uva.x000924219.
- James Duncan Phillips (1929), The life and times of Richard Derby, merchant of Salem, 1712–1783, Cambridge: Riverside Press, OCLC 3187955
- James Duncan Phillips (1933), Salem in the seventeenth century, Boston: Houghton Mifflin Company
- Federal Writers' Project (1937), "Salem", Massachusetts: a Guide to its Places and People, American Guide Series, Boston: Houghton Mifflin, hdl:2027/mdp.39015014440781 + Chronology
- James Duncan Phillips (1937). Salem in the nineties and some of the people who lived there. Boston: Thomas Todd company. (fulltext via HathiTrust)
- James Duncan Phillips (1937), Salem in the eighteenth century, Boston: Houghton Mifflin Company
- James Duncan Phillips (1947), Salem and the Indies: the story of the great commercial era of the city, Boston: Houghton Mifflin Co., OCLC 535834
- Trudy Ring; Robert M. Salkin, eds. (1995). "Salem". Americas. International Dictionary of Historic Places. Routledge. p. 577+. ISBN 978-1-134-25930-4.

=== Published in the 21st century ===
- Dane Anthony Morrison and Nancy Lusignan Schultz, eds., Salem: Place, Myth, Memory (Boston: Northeastern University Press, 2004)
- "Washington Mazurkerwitz and Veronica Ryewhiskey: Recollections of the Polish Community in Salem". Object of the Month. Massachusetts Historical Society. March 2013.
