= Shepard Block =

- U.S. National Register of Historic Places
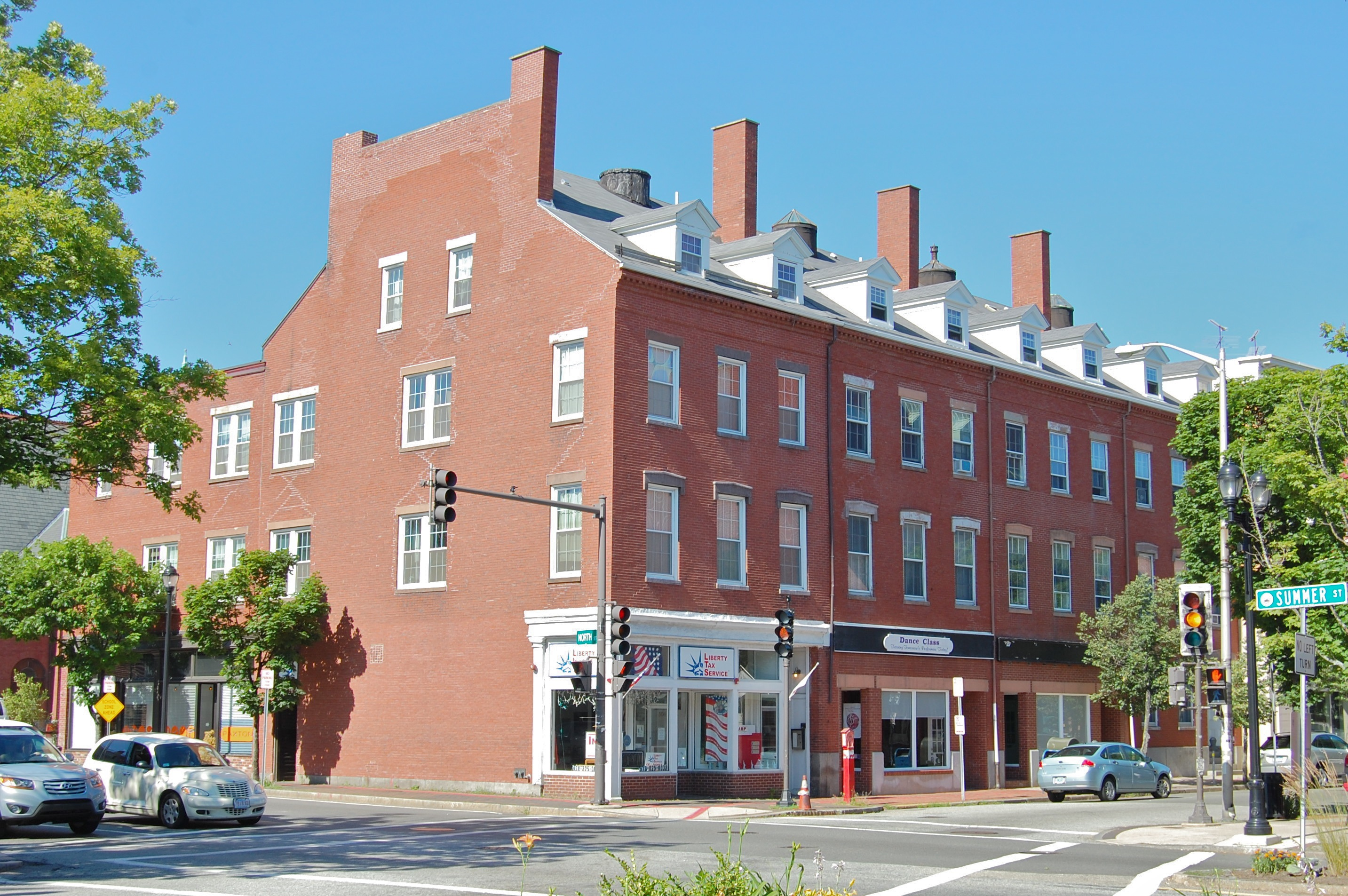
- Shepard Block at the corner of Essex and Summer Streets

- Location within Massachusetts Location within the United States
- Location: Salem, Massachusetts
- Coordinates: 42°31′17.7″N 70°53′54.3″W
- Built: 1851
- Architectural style: Greek Revival
- MPS: Downtown Salem MRA
- NRHP reference No.: 83000584
- Added to NRHP: July 29, 1983

The Shepard Block is a historic rowhouse at 298–304 Essex Street in Salem, Massachusetts. It consists of a row of four brick residences, which were built in 1851 by Michael Shepard as an investment. Each unit is three bays wide and 3.5 stories high; windows on the second and third floors feature granite lintels, while the ground floor of each was modified in the 19th century to accommodate retail storefronts. The roofline of each unit is punctured by two clapboarded gable end dormers, and there are slender rectangular brick chimneys that rise between the units, and on the end facing Summer Street.

The building was listed on the National Register of Historic Places in 1983.

== See also ==
- West Cogswell House, a similar rowhouse nearby at 5-9 Summer Street
- National Register of Historic Places listings in Salem, Massachusetts
- National Register of Historic Places listings in Essex County, Massachusetts
- List of historic houses in Massachusetts
