= William Stone (attorney) =

American politician

Attorney General of South Carolina
- In office 1876

Personal details
- Born: September 4, 1842 East Machias, Maine, US
- Died: May 22, 1897 (aged 54) New York, New York, US
- Resting place: Longwood Cemetery
- Party: Republican
- Children: 2, inc. Herbert L. Stone
- Parent(s): Thomas Treadwell Stone; Laura Poor Stone
- Occupation: Soldier, lawyer

William Stone (September 4, 1842 – May 22, 1897) was a Union army officer, Freedmen's Bureau agent, abolitionist, and attorney who briefly served as Attorney General of South Carolina during the Reconstruction era.

== Parentage ==
William Stone was born on September 4, 1842, in East Machias, Maine. He was the son of Laura Poor Stone and Thomas Treadwell Stone, a prominent Unitarian pastor, fiery abolitionist, and Transcendentalist. William's great grandfather, Thomas Treadwell, fought as a minuteman at the Battle of Bunker Hill. His maternal uncle, Henry Varnum Poor, was one of the founders of the financial rating firm, Standard and Poor's.

== Early life ==
William spent his early boyhood in Salem, Massachusetts, and later in Bolton, Massachusetts, to which his family relocated after his father's militant anti-slavery sermons led his Salem parishioners to reject him.

The Stone family finances were largely exhausted by Harvard University educations for William's two older brothers, so William never attended college. During this period he adopted strong anti-slavery views of his own. He became a consummate diarist beginning with a boyhood diary in 1858, continuing with a detailed wartime diary 1861 through 1865, and concluding with a comprehensive journal of his key role in reconstruction of the post-war South 1866-1868.

In late 1860, he wrote a letter to his father in which he predicted Abraham Lincoln's election as president. Less accurately, he also predicted that the "fire eaters of South Carolina" would never follow through on their threat to secede if Lincoln were elected.

== Civil War service ==
Confederate cannons fired on Fort Sumter in Charleston Harbor on April 12, 1861, and William Stone's boyhood diary records that on May 8 he signed up as an 18-year-old volunteer to subdue the Rebellion. After seven weeks of drilling with other volunteers, he "went into camp" on June 28, 1861, as a private in the 19th Massachusetts Infantry Regiment.

Stone fought in major Civil War battles at Savage Station, Antietam, Chancellorsville, and Gettysburg. After sustaining a severe wound at Antietam, he was commissioned a Second Lieutenant. Following his third wound at Gettysburg, he was posted to an administrative position in Philadelphia.

== Freedmen's Bureau service ==
At the close of the war in 1865, Stone elected to stay in the army. In early 1866, now a brevet Major, he was assigned to the newly created Freedmen's Bureau. Designed by Congress to bridge the gap between slavery and citizenship for some four million largely illiterate African Americans, the Bureau represented America's first great social engineering project. As an agent of the Bureau in South Carolina, Stone struggled (against the violent resistance of the planter class and the Ku Klux Klan) to achieve the Bureau's objectives of education, equality in the courts, and fair labor standards for the newly freed slaves. He frequently presided over provost courts to ensure fair treatment of freedmen in legal disputes, and was instrumental in establishing schools for children of former slaves in his part of South Carolina.

== Marriage and children ==
In 1869, Major Stone married Mary Taylor, a Quaker from Pennsylvania who had been assigned by the Society of Friends to teach black children in South Carolina. They proceeded to have two sons, Alfred and Herbert. Herbert went on to become editor and publisher of Yachting and was instrumental in reestablishing the Bermuda Yacht Races.

== Legal and political career ==
In 1870, Stone resigned from the army to practice law in South Carolina. Following a successful law career in Charleston, he became active in state politics and, in 1876, was appointed by Governor Daniel Henry Chamberlain as Attorney General for South Carolina.

== Later life ==
When Governor Chamberlain's reelection was overturned by Wade Hampton in 1877, Stone returned with his family to the North, and established a highly successful career as an attorney in New York City. He died in New York City in 1897, and is buried next to his wife in the Quaker Cemetery in Longwood Gardens, Pennsylvania.

== Notes ==
Legal offices
| Preceded by Samuel Wickliff Melton | Attorney General of South Carolina; 1876 | Succeeded by Robert Brown Elliott |
