= Crombie Street District =

- U.S. National Register of Historic Places
- U.S. Historic district
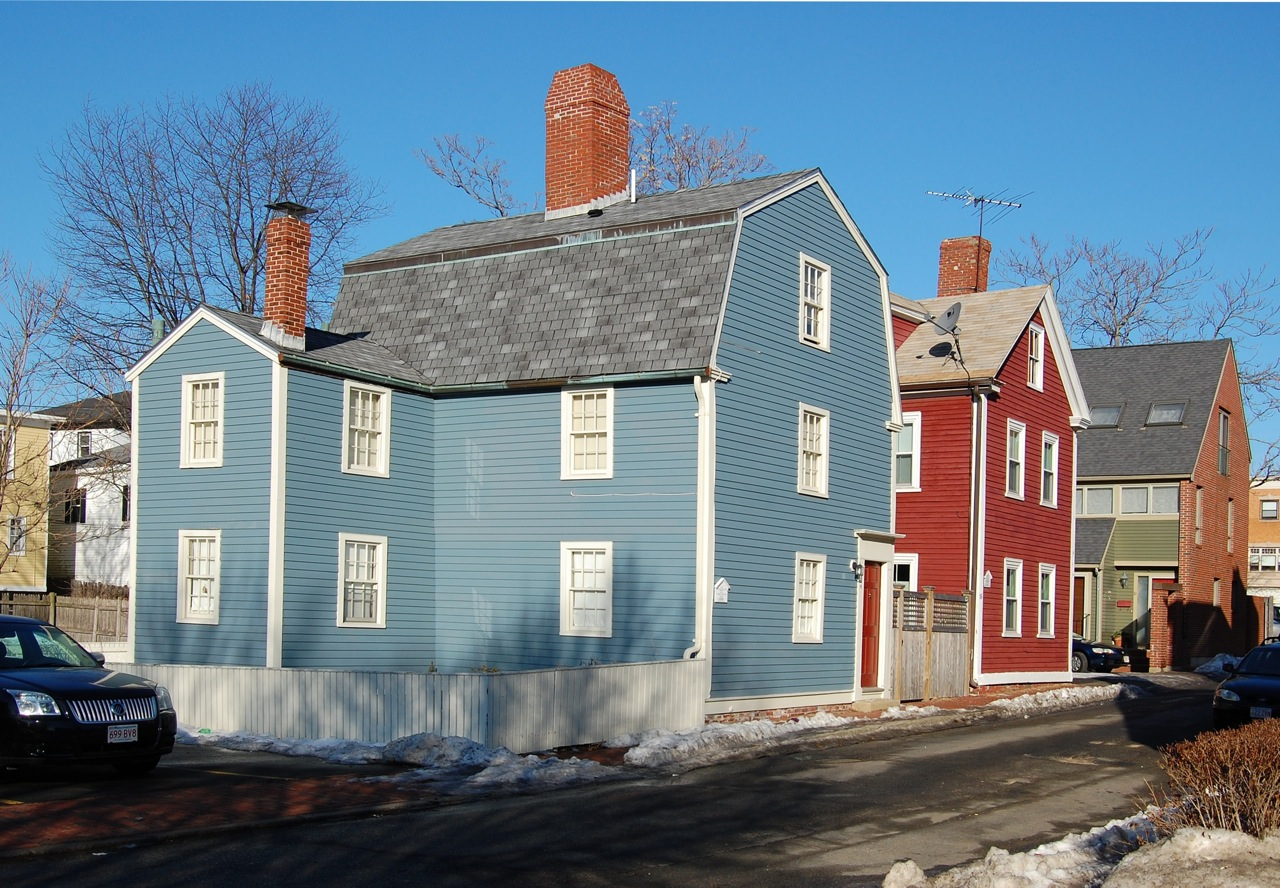
- Crombie Street house of William Pike, friend of Nathaniel Hawthorne.

- Location within Massachusetts Location within the United States
- Location: Salem, Massachusetts
- Coordinates: 42°31′14″N 70°53′52″W
- Architectural style: Italianate, Georgian, Federal
- MPS: Downtown Salem MRA
- NRHP reference No.: 83000575
- Added to NRHP: September 16, 1983

The Crombie Street District in Salem, Massachusetts encompasses a small residential enclave in a now urbanized part of central Salem. It consists of seven houses and one church, located at 7-15 and 16-18 Crombie St., and 13 Barton Street. The district was listed on the National Register of Historic Places in 1983.

Crombie Street was laid out in 1805 by Benjamin Crombie, who owned a tavern on nearby Essex Street. He sold off all of that property by 1819, at which time only two of the surviving houses (#9 and #15 Crombie) had been built. The house at #9 was built by Crombie c. 1809, and was occupied and eventually purchased by Joel Bowker, a leading Salem merchant and developer (one of Bowker's properties survives on Essex Street near the Peabody Essex Museum). The house is an elegant brick Federalist that was altered in the 1860s with the addition of Italianate styling. The house at #15 is a 2 1/2-story wood-frame building that has retained its Federal styling.

The William Pike house, at 18 Crombie Street, is a c. 1770 house that was moved to Crombie Street in 1830. It is a 2 1/2-story Georgian house with a gambrel roof. William Pike was an abolitionist and an associate of Nathaniel Hawthorne, who played an important role in the Underground Railroad.

== See also ==
- List of historic houses in Massachusetts
- National Register of Historic Places listings in Salem, Massachusetts
- National Register of Historic Places listings in Essex County, Massachusetts

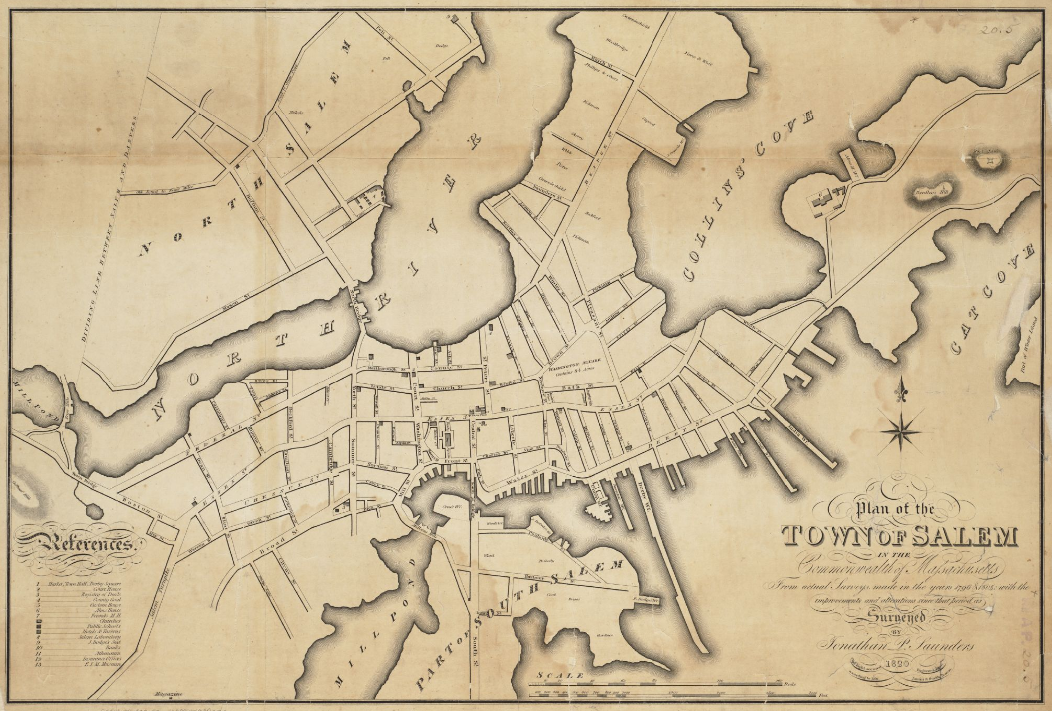
Salem - 1820
