= Herbert L. Stone =

American magazine editor and yacht racer (1871–1955)

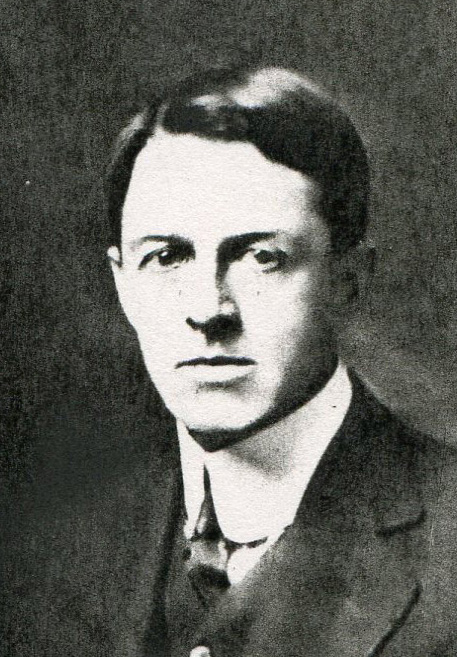
- Herbert L. Stone, 1909
- Born: January 18, 1871 Charleston, South Carolina, US
- Died: September 27, 1955 New York, New York, US
- Occupation: Magazine editor, publisher

Herbert Lawrence Stone (January 18, 1871 – September 27, 1955) was an American magazine editor and publisher, and a renowned sailor. He was the editor of Yachting from 1908 until 1952.

== Early life ==
Herbert Lawrence Stone was born in 1871 in Charleston, South Carolina, to William and Mary (Taylor) Stone. His father William was a successful New York attorney, after serving for a short time as South Carolina Attorney General. Herbert's paternal grandfather Thomas Treadwell Stone was a prominent New England minister and Transcendentalist. Herbert spent much of his childhood in New York, but spent many summers in Plymouth, Massachusetts, learning to sail in Cape Cod bays.

After being diagnosed with a lung condition that was expected to significantly shorten his life, Stone went to sea at the age of 17. He made several voyages on the schooner Hattie Weston under the command of Captain Josiah Morton. Stone subsequently went to work as assistant paymaster for the New York Central Railroad. In 1898 Herbert married Redelia Gilchrist in Iowa City, Iowa, and had two sons, William and James.

== Career with Yachting magazine ==
On January 1, 1907, publisher Oswald Garrison Villard released the first issue of Yachting. A year later Villard appointed his "schoolmate and lifelong friend", 37-year-old Herbert Stone, as the magazine's second editor. Stone continued as the editor through a series of ownership changes, except for a brief two-year period during World War I when he went to war and left William Atkin in charge of Yachting.

In 1920 Herbert Stone, Albert Britt, and William A. Miles purchased the magazine from Villard, selling it to John Clarke Kennedy a few years later. In 1938 Stone assembled the Yachting Publishing Company and took on the role of president, publisher, and editor. In the years that followed, he wrote many articles for the magazine, both under a variety of pen names as well as his own. Stone also wrote and edited a number of books, including ABC of Boat Sailing and America's Cup Races. He served as the editor and guiding spirit of the magazine until his retirement in 1952. He remained as publisher and president of the corporation until his death in 1955.

== World War I ==
Stone joined the U.S. Navy when World War I started, and was the commanding officer of USS Submarine Chaser No. 1, sailing out of Hampton Roads and off the Virginia Capes. Later as a lieutenant and navigating officer of the USS Pastores supply ship, he served on trans-Atlantic troop transport duty. When the war ended Stone and a few friends bought some cargo schooners and formed Mercator Navigation Company, operating in coastal and foreign trade. But that business soon closed as steam was replacing sail on the seas, and the operation of those schooners became economically impracticable.

== Boating and racing ==
In 1909 Herbert was one of the organizers of a sailing race around Long Island and won the Brooklyn Challenge Cup in Waialua the following year. In 1922 Stone helped to organize and became one of the 33 charter members of the Cruising Club of America and served as its second commodore in 1923. His influence helped steer that club to a preeminent position in the national and even global yachting picture. Although primarily a sailor, Stone won a race around Long Island in 1916 in the power cruiser Cero.

In the early 1920s Stone and a few others decided to revive Bermuda racing. By "diligent and enthusiastic promotion" they convinced 22 yacht owners to take part in the Bermuda Race, an event that started in New London, Connecticut, and finished in Bermuda. The race gained national interest and had grown to 84 entries in 1954. Stone sailed in the early Bermuda Races but stopped racing in that event in the 1930s.

Stone died on September 27, 1955, and his ashes were scattered in Long Island Sound. The Royal Bermuda Yacht Club flew its flag at half staff on the day of his funeral, the first time in the 111-year history of that club it was done for a non-member. A few months before his death friends of Stone provided a perpetual trophy in his name to go to the first yacht to finish the Bermuda Race Cruiser Division each year it is held. "The Skipper" did not live to make the first presentation of the Herbert L. Stone Memorial Trophy.

Stone was inducted into the National Sailing Hall of Fame on November 9, 2019.

== Publications ==
- The Yachtsman's Handbook on the Practical Equipping, Care and Handling of Boats, Stone, Herbert L., Outing Publishing Company, New York, 1912.
- Ice-boating; the latest opinions of the foremost authorities in America, Stone, Herbert L., Outing Publishing Company, New York, 1913.
- The America's Cup Races, Stone, Herbert L., Outing Publishing Company, New York, 1914.
- Millions for Defense; a pictorial history of the races for the America's Cup, Stone, Herbert L. and Alfred Fullerton Loomis. The Derrydale Press, New York, 1934.
- ABC of Boat Sailing, Stone, Herbert L., Dodd, Mead & Company, 1946.
- The America's Cup Races, Stone, Herbert L., and William H. Taylor and William W. Robinson, W.W. Norton & Company, New York, 1958. ISBN 0-393-03167-5
