= William Murray House =

Historic house in Massachusetts, United States

- U.S. National Register of Historic Places
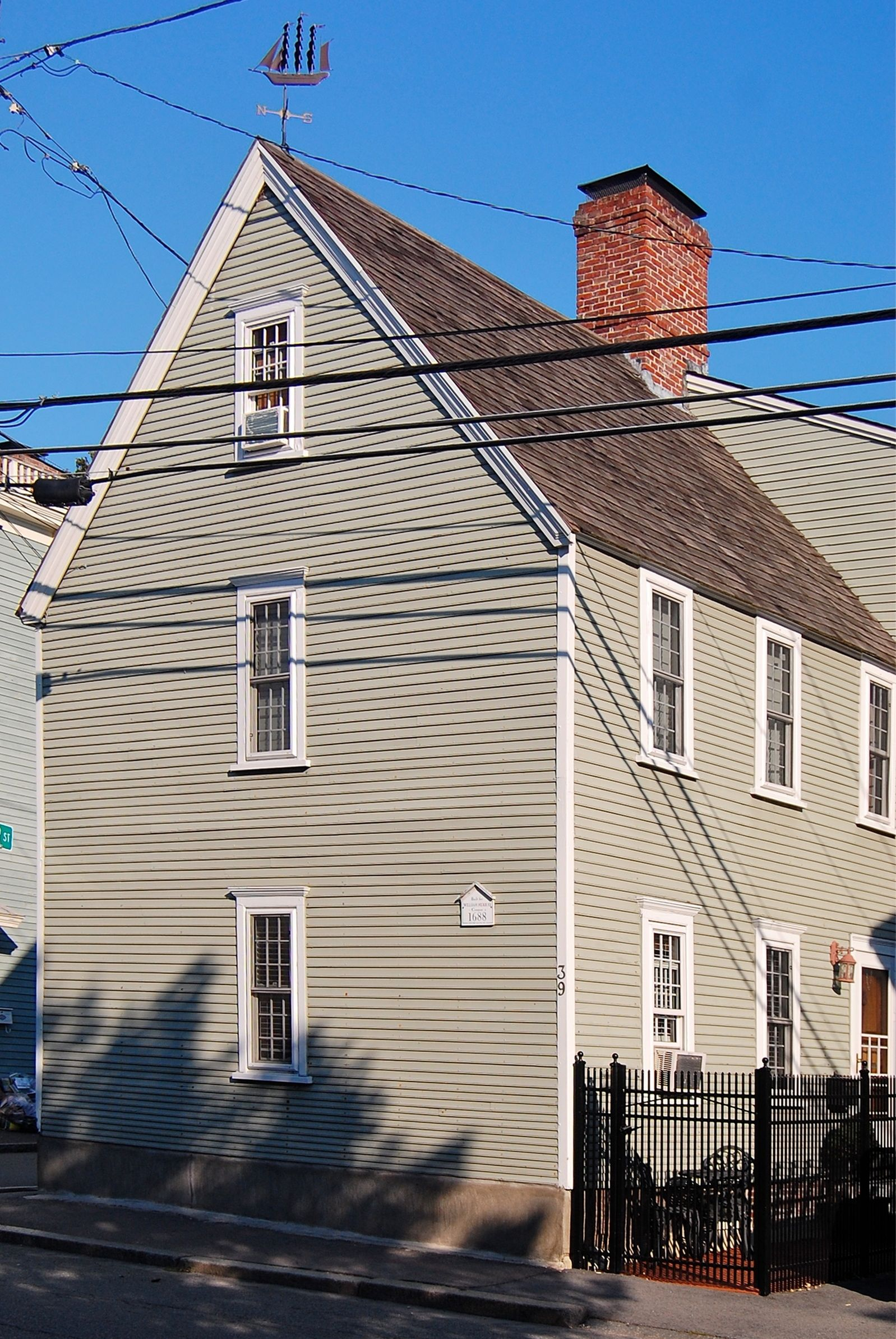
- The western part of the house

- Location within Massachusetts Location within the United States
- Location: 39 Essex Street, Salem, Massachusetts
- Coordinates: 42°31′25.5″N 70°53′7.4″W
- Built: 1688
- Architectural style: Colonial
- MPS: First Period Buildings of Eastern Massachusetts TR
- NRHP reference No.: 90000257
- Added to NRHP: March 9, 1990

The William Murray House is a historic First Period house on the east side of Salem, Massachusetts. It is a two-story wood-frame house that consists of two distinct sections that have not always been treated as a single unit. Its construction history provides a window into 17th and 18th century building methods. The westernmost section was built c. 1688, and is three window bays wide and a single room in depth. The eastern section, also three bays wide and one room deep, was added in the late 17th or early 18th century. The western portion originally had an overhanging section of the second floor; this was altered in the early 18th century, when the roof was raised to a flatter pitch and the overhanging section was concealed by construction of a flush wall.

The two parts of the house were under separate ownership from 1759 until the mid-19th century. As a result, each section has its own staircase, one of them fashioned with Second Period (mid-18th century) turned woodwork. The house underwent restoration in 1780 by a skilled local woodworker, who documented many of its First Period features, and retained portions of original decorations.

The house was listed on the National Register of Historic Places in 1990.

== See also ==
- List of historic houses in Massachusetts
- List of the oldest buildings in Massachusetts
- List of the oldest buildings in the United States
- National Register of Historic Places listings in Salem, Massachusetts
- National Register of Historic Places listings in Essex County, Massachusetts
