= Bakers Island Light =

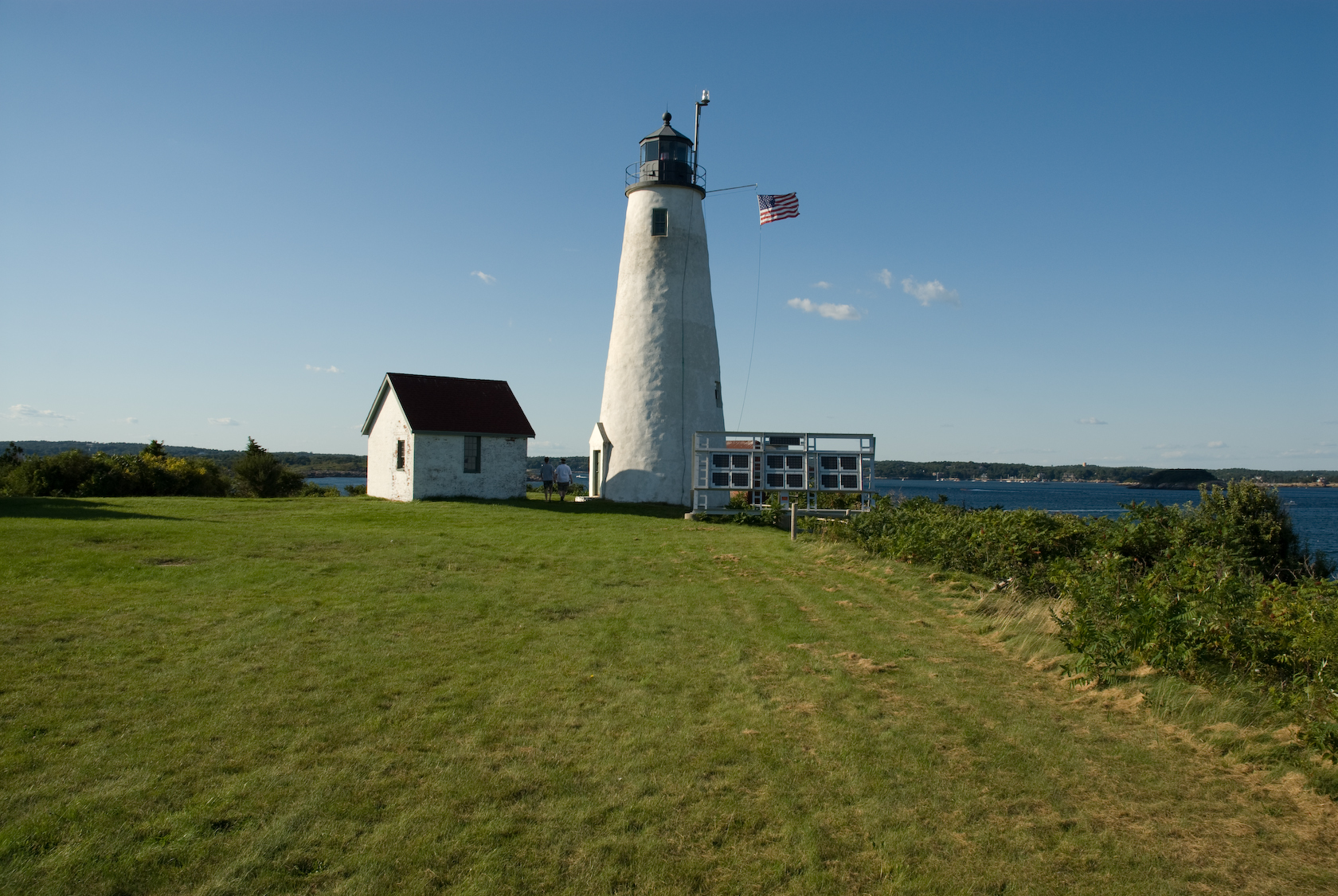
- Location: E of Salem on Bakers Island, Salem, Massachusetts
- Coordinates: 42°32′11.2″N 70°47′9.3″W

Tower
- Constructed: 1791
- Foundation: Granite
- Construction: Granite and concrete
- Automated: 1972
- Height: 59 feet (18 m)
- Shape: Conical
- Markings: White with black lantern
- Heritage: National Register of Historic Places listed place
- Fog signal: Horn: 1 every 30s

Light
- First lit: 1821 (current tower)
- Focal height: 111 feet (34 m)
- Lens: 4th order Fresnel lens (original), 7.5 inches (190 mm) (current)
- Range: White 16 nautical miles (30 km; 18 mi); Red 14 nautical miles (26 km; 16 mi)
- Characteristic: Alternating White and Red 20s
- Baker's Island Light Station
- U.S. National Register of Historic Places
- Area: 11.5 acres (4.7 ha)
- Built: 1821
- MPS: Lighthouses of Massachusetts TR (AD)
- NRHP reference No.: 76000289
- Added to NRHP: November 21, 1976

Bakers Island Light is a historic lighthouse on Bakers Island in Salem, Massachusetts. The station was originally established in 1791, with a daymark. This was replaced in 1798 by two lights atop a keeper's house, one at each end. After storm damage in 1815, an octagonal stone tower was constructed. The current round stone tower was added in 1820. The 1820 tower was taller, leading to the names "Ma" and "Pa". The two remained in service until 1926, when the older, shorter tower was removed.

The light was added to the National Register of Historic Places as Baker's Island Light Station in 1976.

== Nomenclature ==
The City of Salem, the Coast Guard, and NOAA spell the name without an apostrophe, but the National Register of Historic Places includes it. The name is always written with the "s".

A USCG photo circa 1925	Bakers Island Lighthouse 2020

== See also ==
- National Register of Historic Places listings in Salem, Massachusetts
- List of lighthouses in the United States, Massachusetts
