= United States Post Office–Salem Main =

- US Post Office–Salem Main
- U.S. National Register of Historic Places
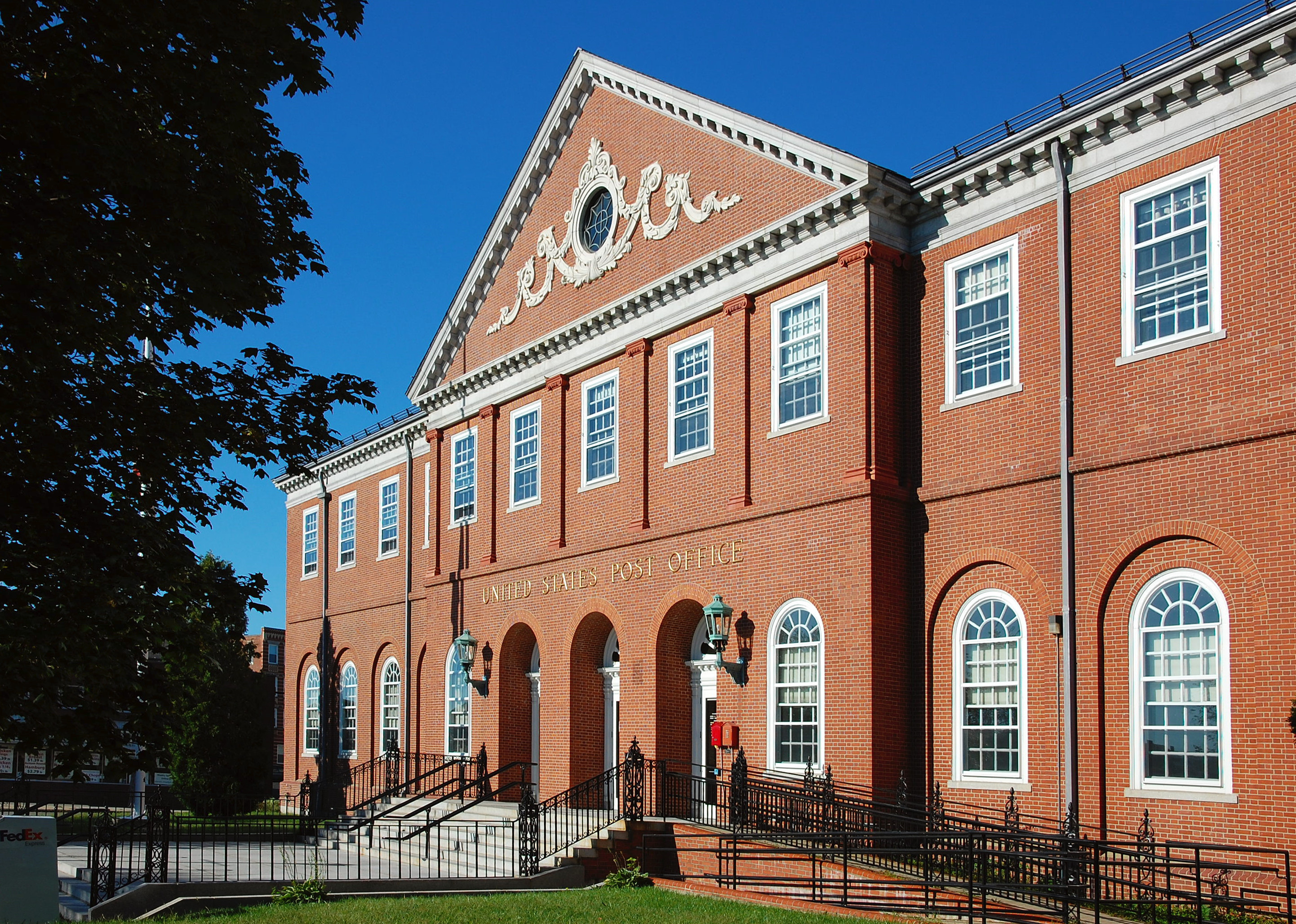
- Salem Post Office

- Location within Massachusetts Location within the United States
- Location: Salem, Massachusetts
- Coordinates: 42°31′10.56″N 70°53′47.54″W
- Built: 1932
- Architect: Smith & Walker; Hadley, Robert W.
- Architectural style: Colonial Revival
- NRHP reference No.: 86001211
- Added to NRHP: June 4, 1986

The US Post Office—Salem Main is a historic post office building at 2 Margin Street in Salem, Massachusetts. It is one of Salem's finest civic Colonial Revival buildings. The two story brick building was built in 1932 to a design by Wenham-based architect Philip Horton Smith of Smith & Walker. Its roof follows a cross-gable plan, with its main entry on the long side of the building, topped by a decorated pedimented gable. First floor windows are round-arched and slightly recessed, while those on the second floor are rectangular. A line of granite marks the transition to the cornice at the top of the facade; the cornice, along with the gable elements, features heavy dentil molding.

The building was listed on the National Register of Historic Places in 1986; it continues to serve as Salem's primary post office.

== See also ==
- National Register of Historic Places listings in Salem, Massachusetts
- National Register of Historic Places listings in Essex County, Massachusetts
- List of United States post offices
