= Point Neighborhood Historic District =

Historic district in Massachusetts, United States

- U.S. National Register of Historic Places
- U.S. Historic district
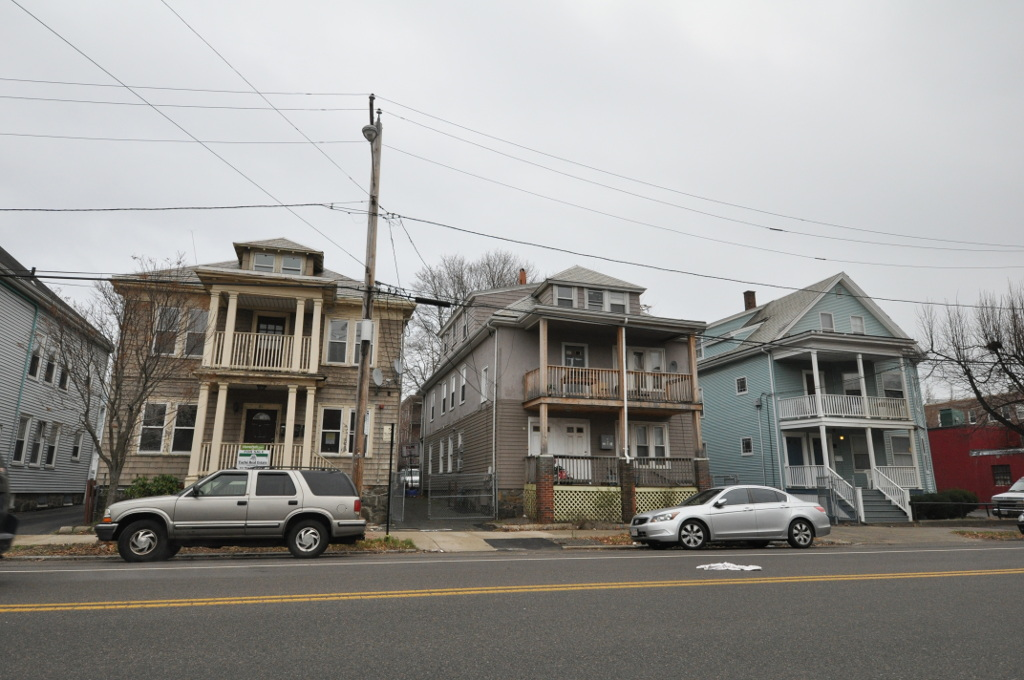
- Congress Street scene

- Location within Massachusetts Location within the United States
- Location: Salem, Massachusetts
- Coordinates: 42°31′0″N 70°53′29″W
- NRHP reference No.: 14000972
- Added to NRHP: December 2, 2014

The Point Neighborhood Historic District, also known as Stage Point, is a predominantly residential historic district just south of downtown Salem, Massachusetts. It is a densely built, roughly rectangular grid of streets east of Lafayette Street, south of the South River, west of Congress Street, and north of Chase and Leavitt Streets. This area was the target of a major redevelopment effort undertaken by the city after a fire swept through in 1914. With many multiunit residential buildings constructed in just three years, the architecture of the area is remarkably cohesive. Commercial development is generally restricted to the fringes of the area, on Lafayette Street (a major local thoroughfare) and Congress Street.

The district was listed on the National Register of Historic Places in 2014.

== See also ==
- National Register of Historic Places listings in Salem, Massachusetts
- National Register of Historic Places listings in Essex County, Massachusetts
