= John P. Peabody House =

Historic house in Massachusetts, United States

- U.S. National Register of Historic Places
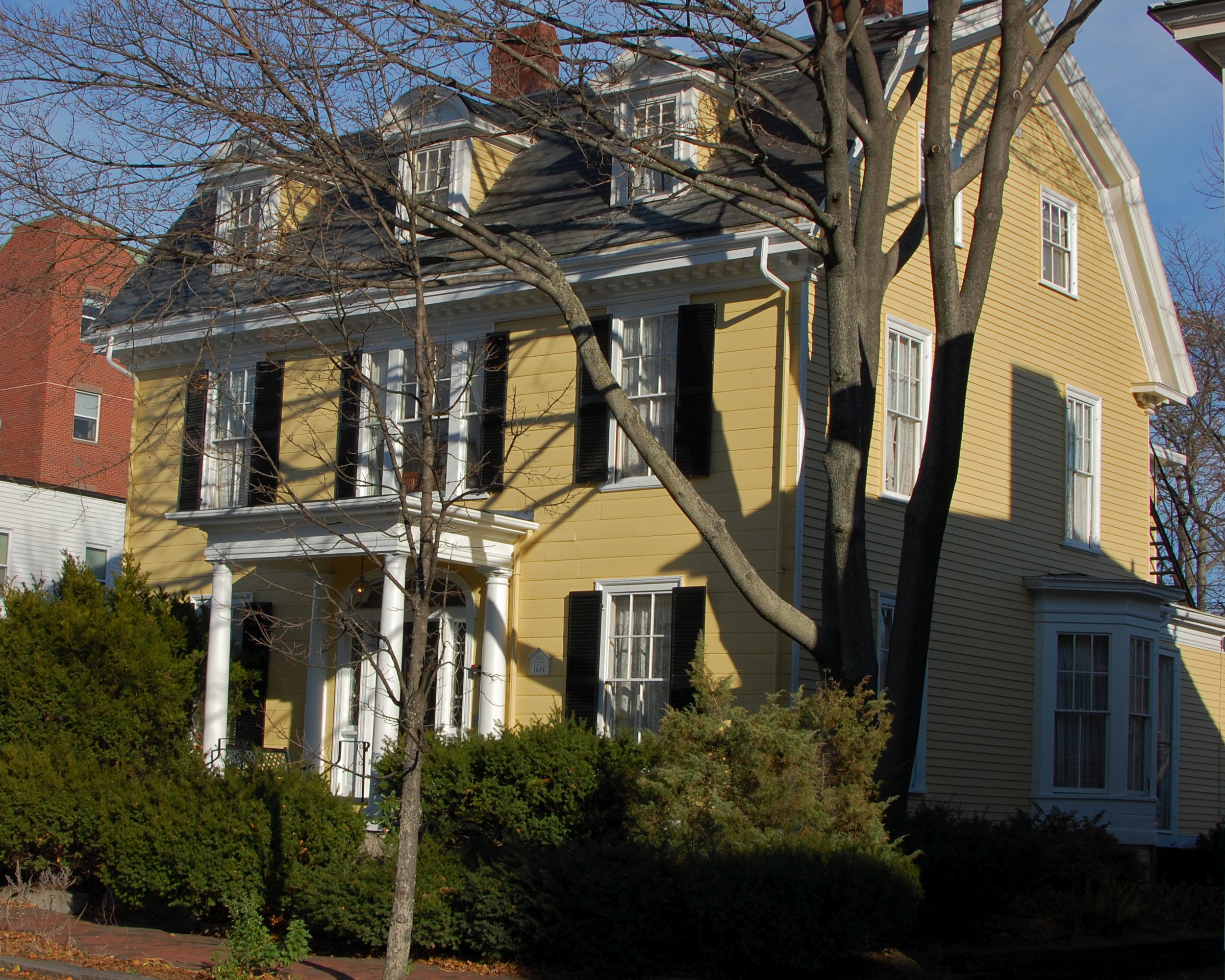
- John Peabody House

- Location within Massachusetts Location within the United States
- Location: Salem, Massachusetts
- Coordinates: 42°31′13″N 70°53′56″W
- Built: 1867
- Architectural style: Colonial Revival
- MPS: Downtown Salem MRA
- NRHP reference No.: 83000581
- Added to NRHP: July 29, 1983

The John P. Peabody House is a historic house at 15 Summer Street in Salem, Massachusetts. Built in 1868 by Salem merchant John P. Peabody, it is a rare early example of Colonial Revival architecture. The two story wood-frame house is three bays wide, with a slate gambrel roof. The centered front door is sheltered by a portico supported by Doric columns. The second story center window reinforces focus, being enlarged slightly by sidelights as compared to the other windows on the facade. The roof is pierced by three dormers, the outer ones with pointed gables and the central one with a rounded pediment reminiscent of the then-fashionable Second Empire style.

The house was listed on the National Register of Historic Places in 1983. It is now owned by the Salem Inn, which also owns the nearby West Cogswell House.

== See also ==
- List of historic houses in Massachusetts
- National Register of Historic Places listings in Salem, Massachusetts
- National Register of Historic Places listings in Essex County, Massachusetts
