= Bakers Island =

Island in Massachusetts, United States

Coordinates: 42.533°N 70.787°W

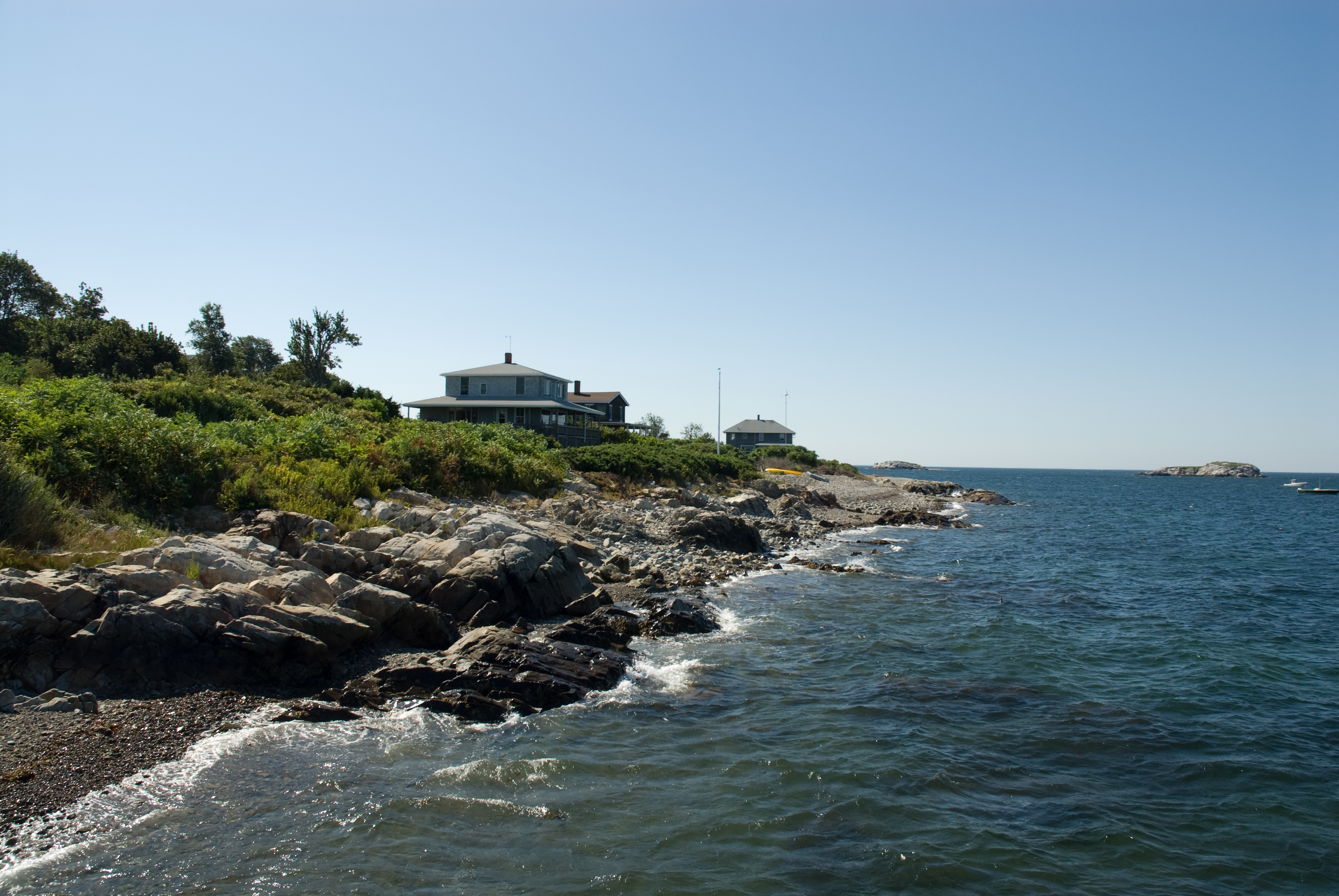
Bakers Island shoreline, pictured in 2008.

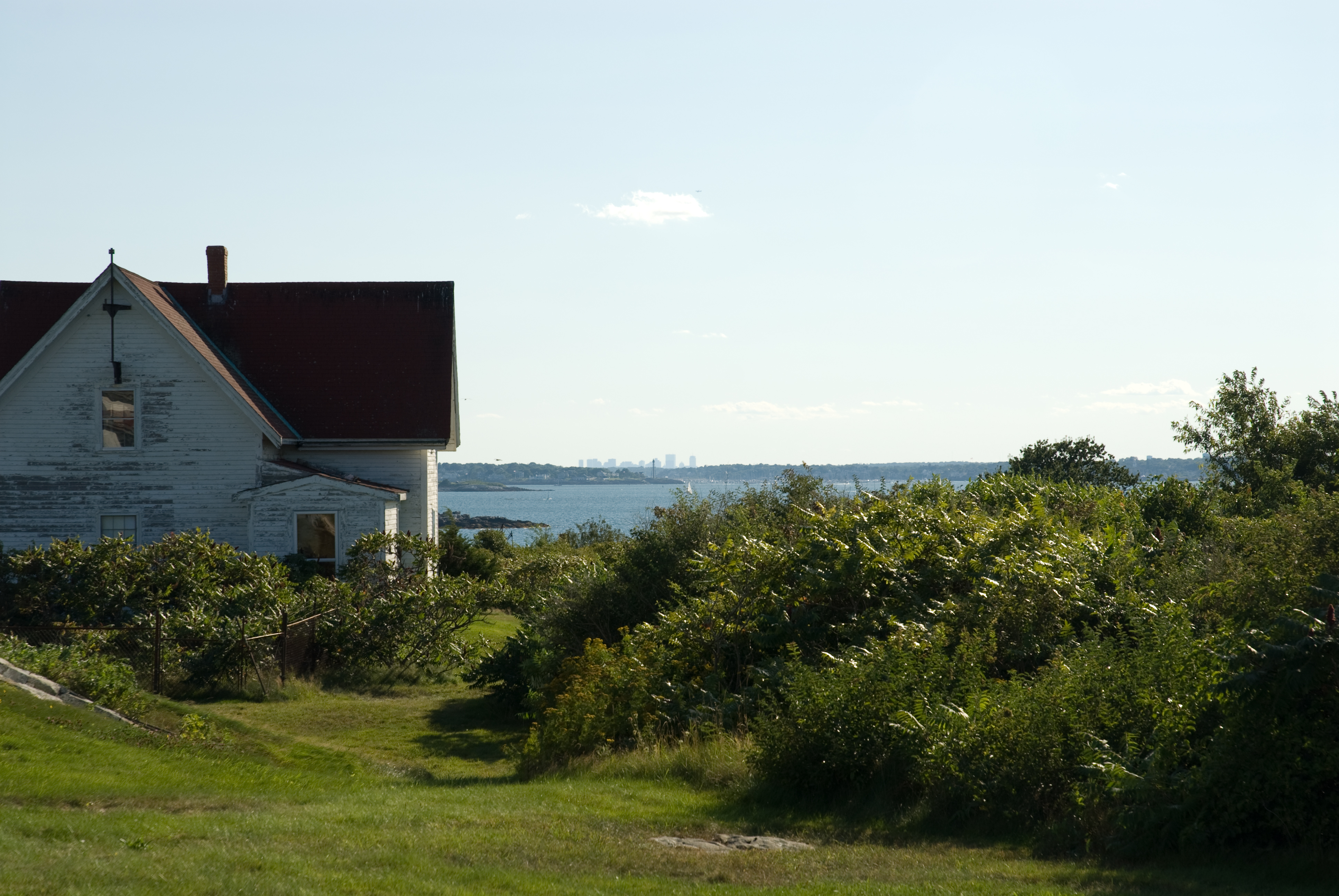
The Boston skyline as seen from the island.

Bakers Island is a small, residential island in Massachusetts Bay, in Salem, Massachusetts.

== Geography ==
Bakers Island is located southeast of Great Misery Island & Little Misery Island, northeast of North Gooseberry Island and South Gooseberry Island, and far northeast of Children's Island. It is the outermost island on the main shipping channel into Salem Harbor. Bakers Island Light, located on the island's northern side, is used for navigation.

The island is pear-shaped. Most of its coast is rocky ledges, except for its western coast. There are three small landlocked ponds located near one another at the center. Vegetation on the island is trees and scrub. There is a private pier on the west side. Most of the buildings are concentrated in the western and southern portions of the island. The island also has a store, volunteer fire house, and the Sherman C. Burnham meeting hall which also provides church services. The island has no public roads, water pipes, sewers, street lights, sidewalks, schools, or municipal buildings.

The City of Salem, the Coast Guard, and NOAA spell the name without an apostrophe, but the National Register of Historic Places includes an apostrophe.

== History ==
The approximately 55-acre (220,000 m^{2}) island was known as Bakers Island as early as the 1630s. Originally owned by the Massachusetts Bay Colony, it was granted to the town of Salem in 1660. John Turner was the first private owner of the island. The island once housed a hotel, but it burned down in 1906. The island houses a summer colony of cottages with about 100 residents. While the island is part of Salem, there was no official public access until the light station land was awarded to the Essex National Heritage Commission of Salem in 2005 as part of an excess property declaration by the government in 2002. The residents appealed this transfer and lost an appeal 2006 by a federal judge, and were denied by the Department of Environmental Protection in 2010.

== Light station ==
The Essex National Heritage Commission owns approximately 11 acres (45,000 m^{2}) of land at the northwest end of the island where Bakers Island Light and its accompanying buildings sit. The light station has been owned and operated by the federal government since 1798. The Salem Marine Society erected an unlit beacon on the island in 1791. The original configuration was twin lights on a single house, first lit on January 3, 1798. A storm severely damaged the twin lights in 1815. Two towers were built, one in 1816 and a taller one in 1820. The shorter tower was demolished in 1926. The Coast Guard undertook a $1.6 million lead paint remediation project in 2012 for the lighthouse and five outbuildings. Access to the lighthouse and grounds is via ferry in the summer season.

In 2023 the HGTV television show, Farmhouse Fixer did an episode where they restored the Assistant Keeper's House at the light station.

== Sources ==
Wise, DeWitt E., "Now, Then: Baker's Island," Baker's Island Association (1964). Unauthored, "The Baker's Island Chronicle 1964-1988," Baker's Island Association (1989).
