= Salem Laundry =

- Salem Landry (sic)
- U.S. National Register of Historic Places
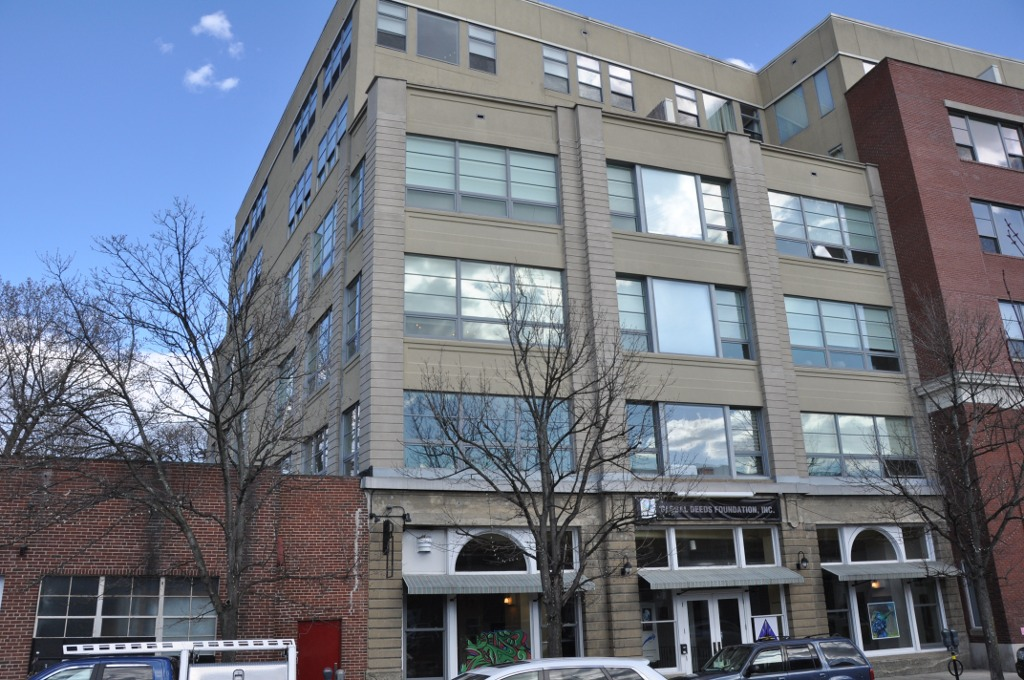

- Location within Massachusetts Location within the United States
- Location: Salem, Massachusetts
- Coordinates: 42°31′12″N 70°53′38″W
- Built: 1906
- MPS: Downtown Salem MRA
- NRHP reference No.: 83000583
- Added to NRHP: July 29, 1983

The Salem Laundry is a historic laundry building at 55 Lafayette Street in Salem, Massachusetts, United States. It is listed on the National Register of Historic Places as "Salem Landry". The building was erected in 1906 and is the first concrete building to be constructed in Salem. The four-story building is divided into three wide bays, with the central bay projecting slightly. The bays have broad windows divided by ashlar-tooled concrete blocks, a styling that became fashionable in the following decade before unadorned concrete became more widely used. The building was built by, and has remained in the hands of, the Hooper family. In 2003, building was converted to condos. who established a commercial laundry in Salem in 1806. It was listed on the National Register in 1983.

== Oldest pizza shop in Salem ==
Engine House Pizza is located on the Street leve & has been serving pizza since 1977.

== See also ==
- National Register of Historic Places listings in Salem, Massachusetts
- National Register of Historic Places listings in Essex County, Massachusetts
