= YMCA (Salem, Massachusetts) =

- U.S. National Register of Historic Places
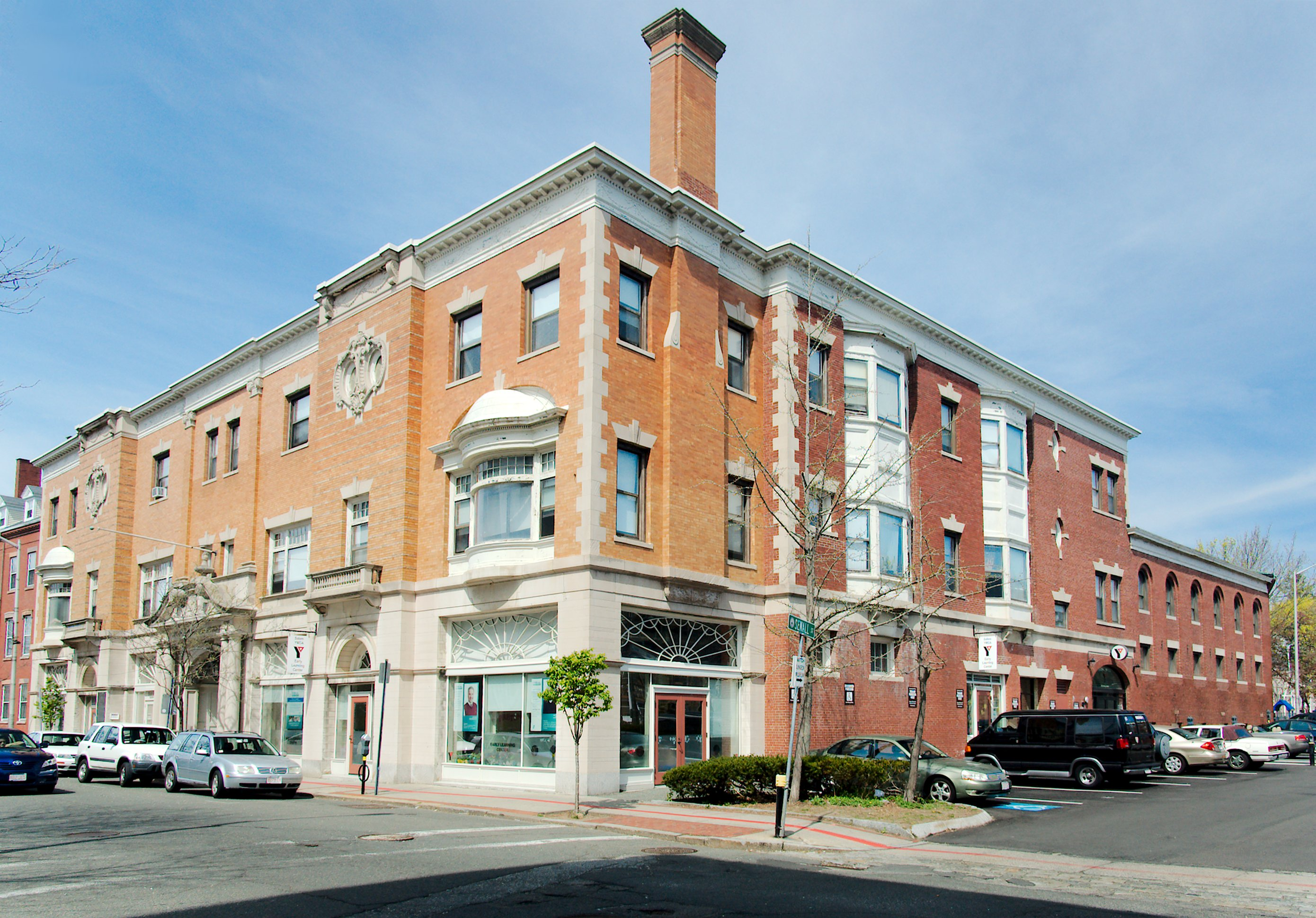
- The Salem YMCA building, est. 1898

- Location within Massachusetts Location within the United States
- Location: 284-296 Essex St., Salem, Massachusetts
- Coordinates: 42°31′17″N 70°53′55″W
- Area: 0.8 acres (0.32 ha)
- Built: 1898
- Architect: Paine, Walter J.
- Architectural style: Classical Revival
- MPS: Downtown Salem MRA
- NRHP reference No.: 83000590
- Added to NRHP: July 29, 1983

The Salem YMCA is a historic YMCA building at 284-296 Essex Street in the Downtown Salem District in Salem, Massachusetts. Its large building is an anchor of the western end of Salem's business district, of which Essex Street is a major component, and is one of the finest Classical Revival buildings in Salem. The Salem YMCA was first organized in 1858, and it commissioned the construction of this building in 1898. The three-story brick-and-limestone building was designed by Walter J. Paine, and has retained most of its exterior styling. The ground floor was designed to house primarily retail establishments, with the YMCA entrance highlighted by an ornate entablature supported by twin columns on either side. Entrances to the retail establishments are also indicated by building bays that project out less prominently than the main entrance. The ground floor is built in limestone, while the upper floors are predominantly brick. The building originally had a loggia on top of the roof, but that was removed in the 1950s.

Faced with declining enrollments through the 1970s, the YMCA sold part of the second and third floors to the Salem Housing Authority, which converted that area to senior housing. The building was listed on the National Register of Historic Places in 1983.

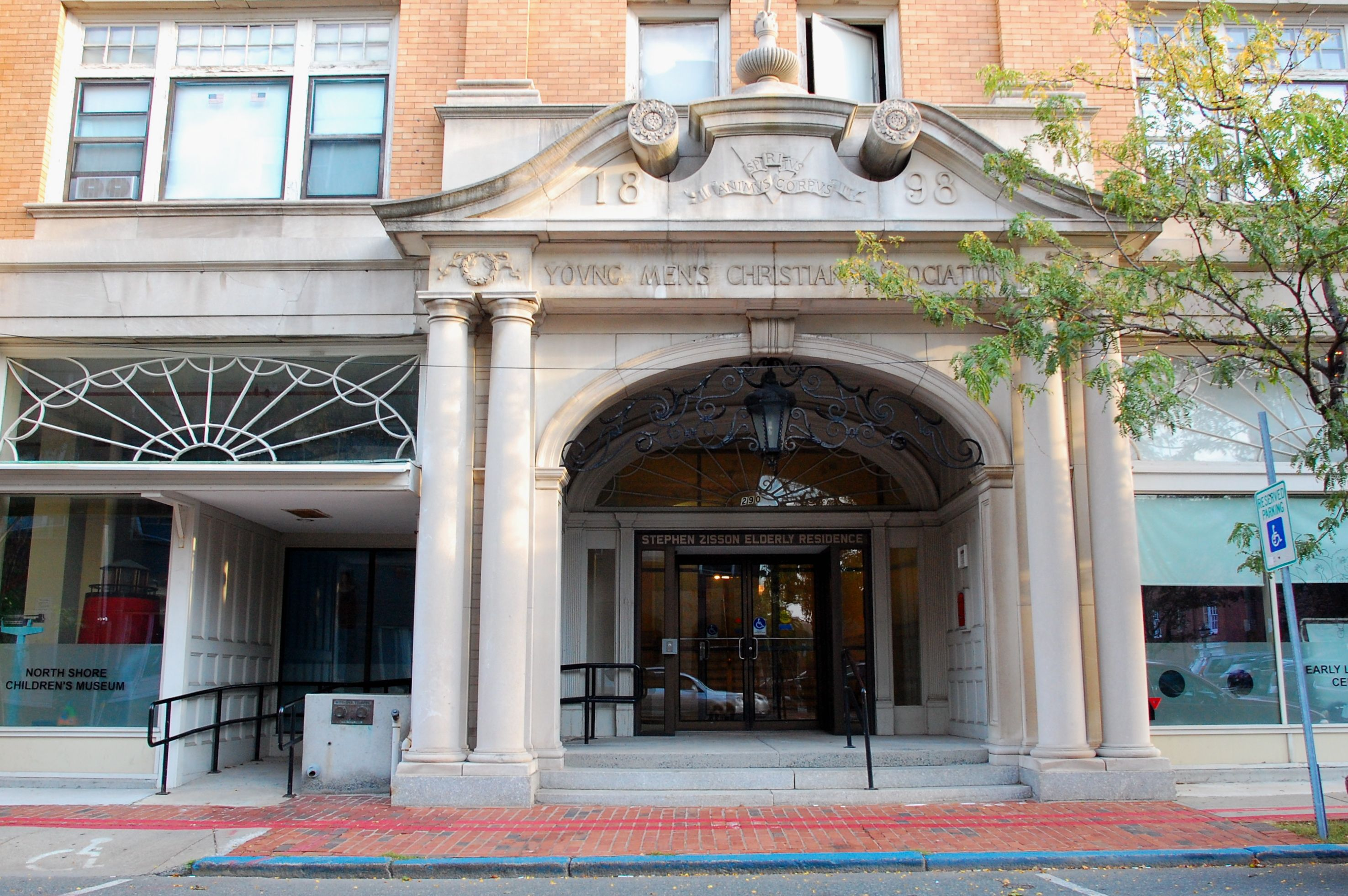
View of the entrance

== See also ==
- National Register of Historic Places listings in Salem, Massachusetts
