= Bridge Street Neck Historic District =

Historic district in Massachusetts, United States

- U.S. National Register of Historic Places
- U.S. Historic district
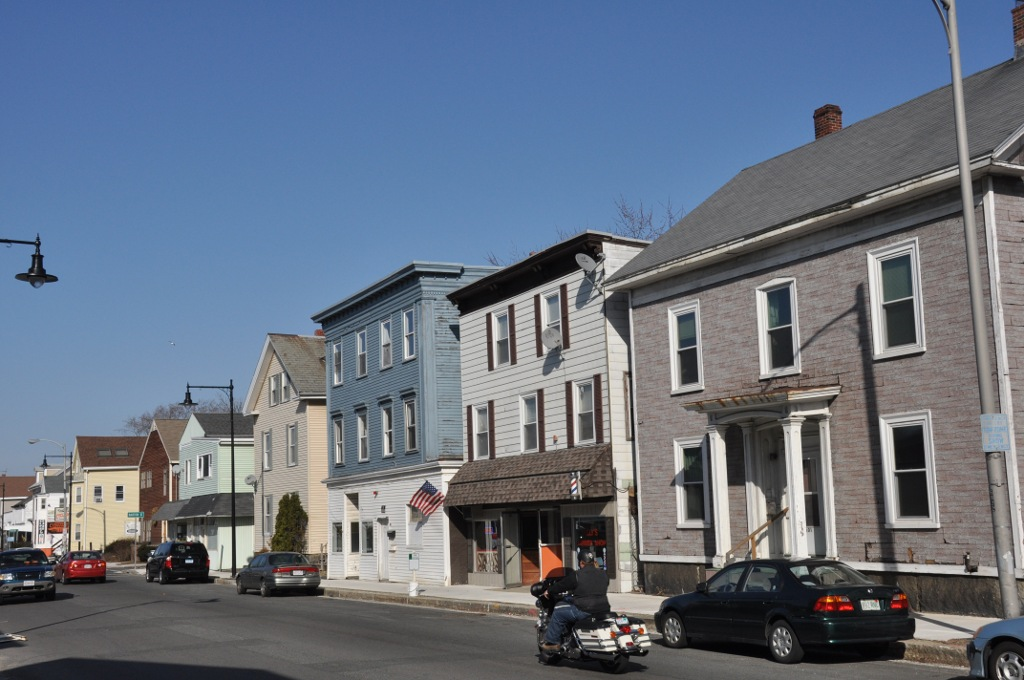
- Bridge Street

- Location within Massachusetts Location within the United States
- Location: Salem, Massachusetts
- Coordinates: 42°31′48″N 70°53′19″W
- Architectural style: Georgian, Greek Revival
- NRHP reference No.: 02000790
- Added to NRHP: July 19, 2002

The Bridge Street Neck Historic District is a predominantly residential historic district in Salem, Massachusetts. It encompasses most of a peninsula of land northeast of downtown Salem, on the route connecting Salem to Beverly, which has been the scene of residential, commercial, and industrial development since the early settlement of Salem in the 1630s. Bridge Street, the spine of the district is a thoroughfare connecting Salem to the bridge leading to Beverly. The district is roughly bounded by railroad tracks to its west, the shore of the peninsula to the east, On the north it is bounded by modern (post-1952) developments, and on the south it abuts the Salem Common Historic District. In addition to properties on Bridge Street, the district includes properties on side streets between March/Osgood Streets, and Howard/Webb Streets. It was listed on the National Register of Historic Places in 2002.

The City of Salem has approximately 19,000 total residences, of which 6% or about 1,200 units are located in the Bridge Street Neck neighborhood.

Historically, the Bridge Street Neck grew as a gateway district organized along the main road and bridge that connects Salem to the cities of Beverly and Danvers (Bridge Street/Route 1A). Land use along the road has traditionally been focused on retail and commercial services that cater to residents of Salem and the surrounding communities, and depend on automobile access. Single- and two-family homes are nestled behind commercial properties on both sides of Bridge Street, extending throughout the neck and all the way to the water.

In August 2008, a new bridge and bypass road (named Sgt. James Ayube Memorial Drive in 2011) opened in order to alleviate the bottleneck traffic on Bridge Street. This bypass connects Route 1A in Beverly directly to downtown Salem along the western coast of the Bridge Street Neck neighborhood, with access road entries located only at either end.

In March to August 2009, a study was completed to generate strategies for the revitalization of the Bridge Street Neck neighborhood, one of the oldest settlements in the City of Salem. The strategy's vision is aimed at maintaining the residential character and scale of the neighborhood, and attracting more business and visitors to its commercial areas. The historical character of the neighborhood shall be reflected in its well maintained buildings and streets.

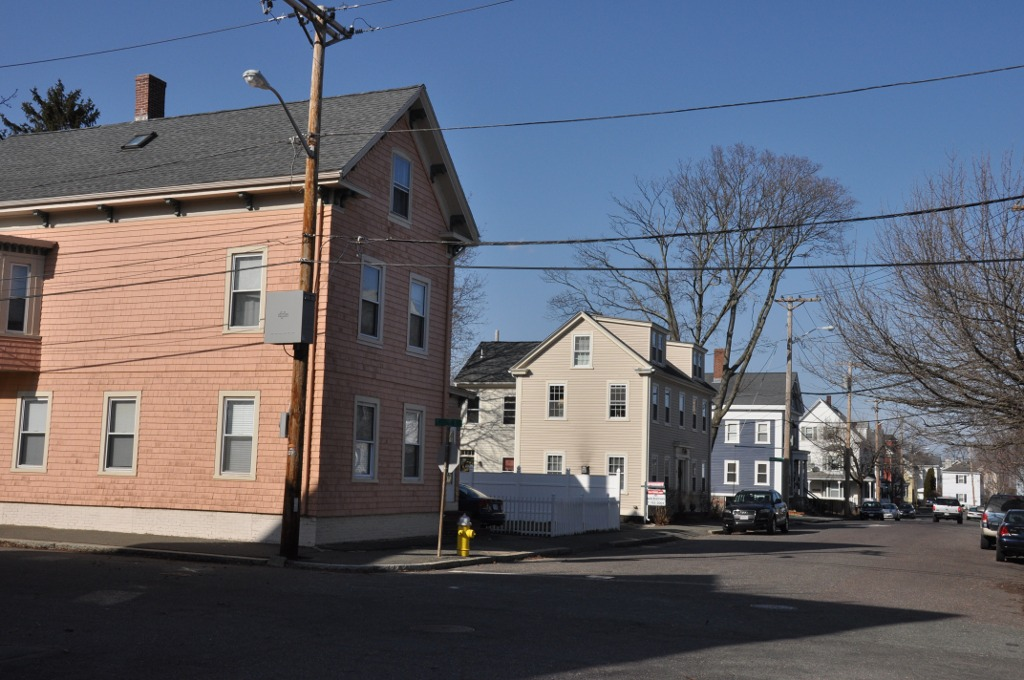
Cross Street, which parallels Bridge Street

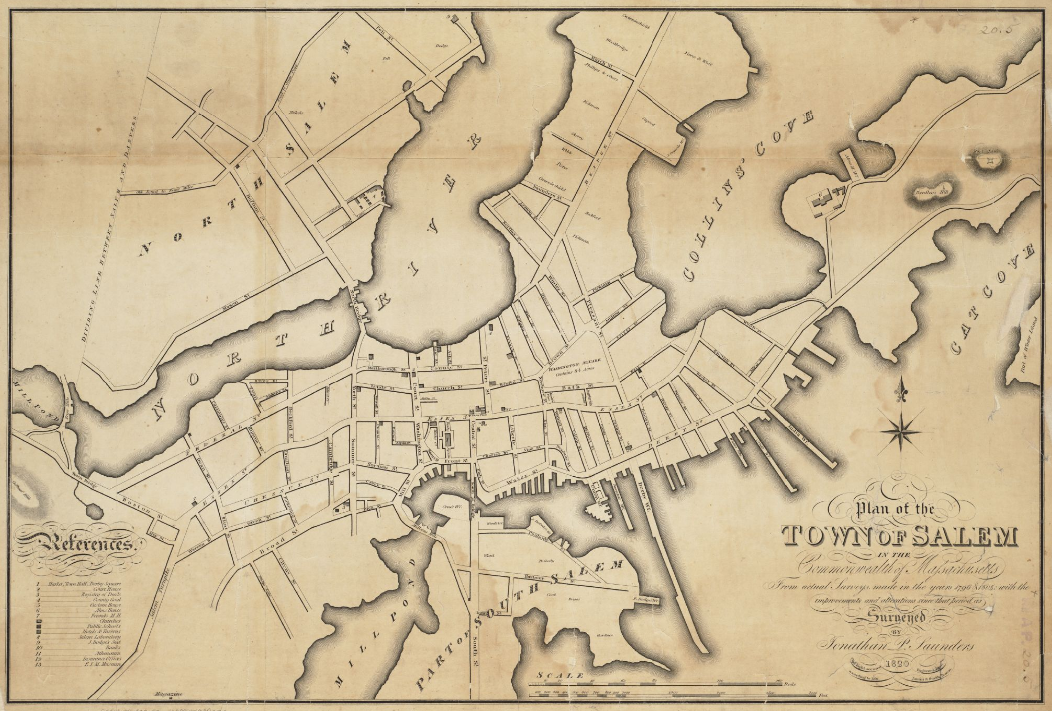
Salem - 1820

== See also ==
- Thomas March Woodbridge House, located just north of the district on Bridge Street
- National Register of Historic Places listings in Salem, Massachusetts
- National Register of Historic Places listings in Essex County, Massachusetts
