= Salem Diner =

- U.S. National Register of Historic Places
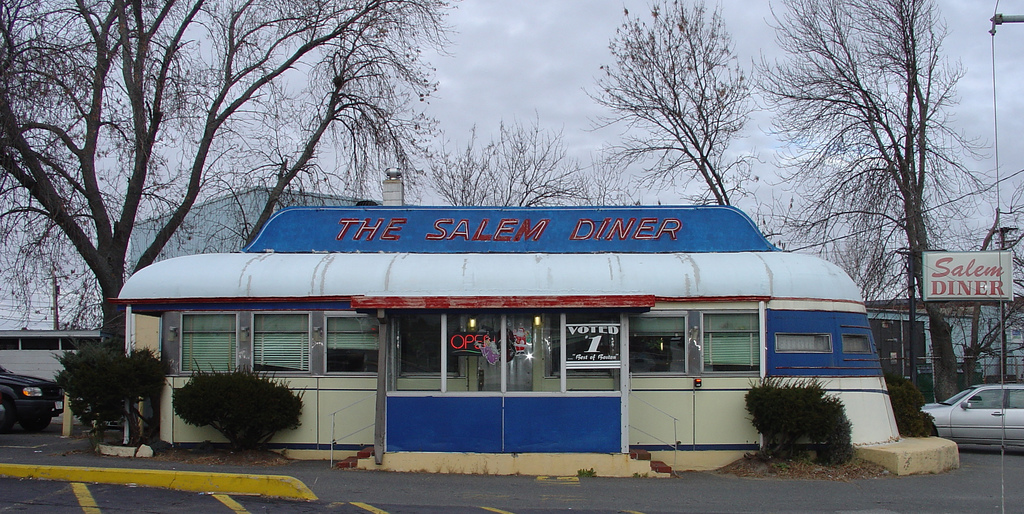

- Location within Massachusetts Location within the United States
- Location: 70 1/2 Loring Ave., Salem, Massachusetts
- Coordinates: 42°30′4″N 70°53′47″W
- Built: 1941
- Architect: Sterling Diners
- MPS: Diners of Massachusetts MPS
- NRHP reference No.: 99001118
- Added to NRHP: September 22, 1999

The Salem Diner is a historic diner in Salem, Massachusetts. It is one of two Sterling Streamliner diners left in Massachusetts, and still stands at its original location. Designated car #4106, it was also one of the last made by the Sterling Company before it closed its doors in 1942. The diner body features a wood frame and porcelain enamel exterior. It has a metal hipped barrel roof, and its eastern end features a characteristic shovel nose. The roofline is decorated by a fin shape that serves as a backdrop for the diner's neon signage. It is mounted on a foundation that is predominantly concrete blocks, with some glass blocks interspersed. Its main entrance is centered on the long side, and is now sheltered by a modern glass vestibule added c. 1960.

The Salem Diner was listed on the National Register of Historic Places in 1999.

The Salem Diner closed Friday, May 31, 2019. In October of that year, plans were announced to relocate the diner and expand with a roof deck.

== See also ==
- National Register of Historic Places listings in Salem, Massachusetts
- National Register of Historic Places listings in Essex County, Massachusetts
