= First Universalist Church (Salem, Massachusetts) =

Historic church in Massachusetts, United States

- U.S. National Register of Historic Places
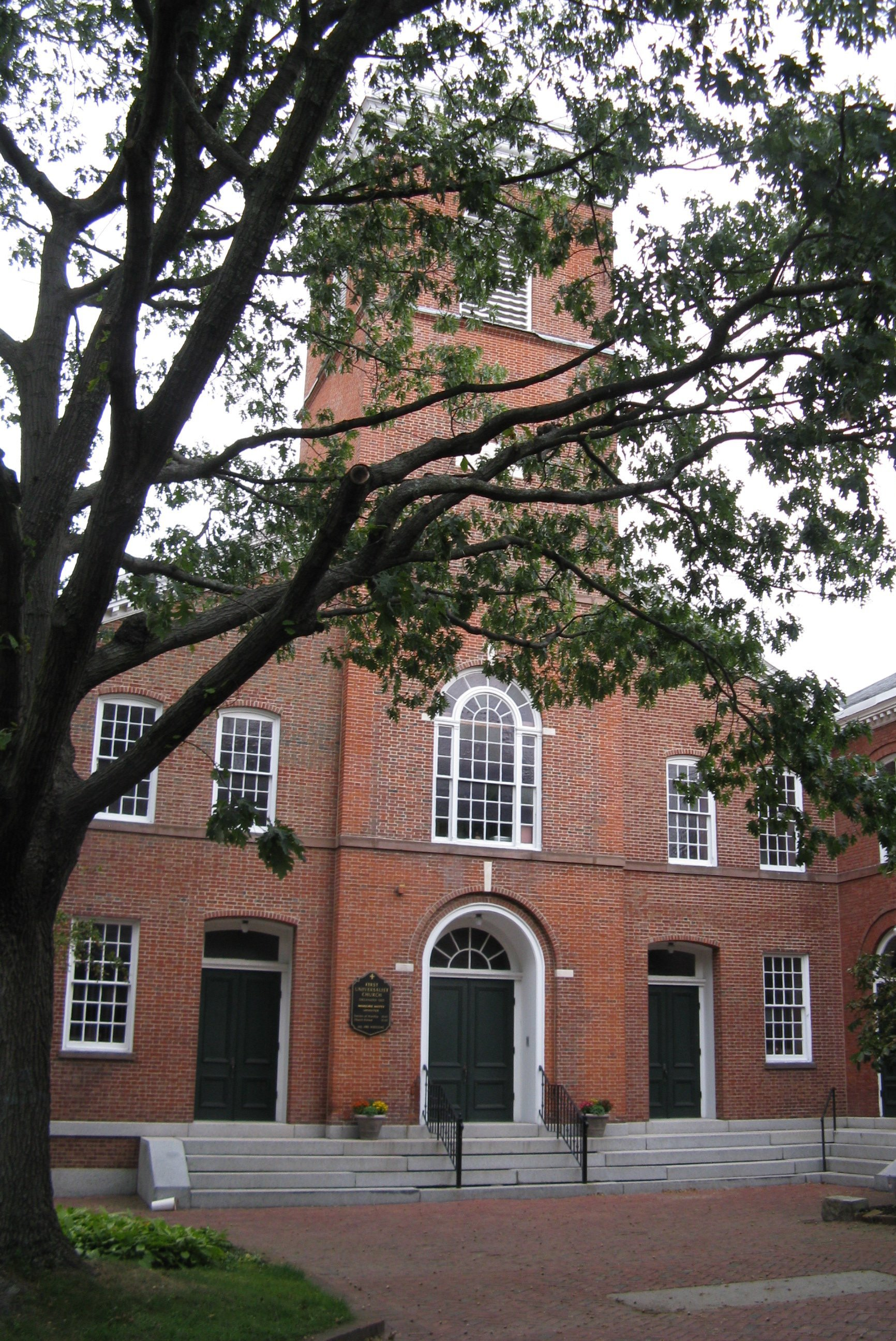
- First Universalist Church

- Location within Massachusetts Location within the United States
- Location: Salem, Massachusetts
- Coordinates: 42°31′26″N 70°53′44″W
- Built: 1808
- Architect: Putnam, William
- Architectural style: Federal
- MPS: Downtown Salem MRA
- NRHP reference No.: 83000577
- Added to NRHP: July 29, 1983

The First Universalist Society of Salem is a historic Universalist former church building at 211 Bridge Street in Salem, Massachusetts.

== History ==
The congregation was founded in 1805 after seven local people with an interest in Universalism attended a lecture by Rev. John Murray, a founder of Universalism. The current church building was constructed in 1808 with Rev. Hosea Ballou, a founder of the Universalist Church, laying the cornerstone of the Federal style building. Inside the building, the Hutchings organ was constructed in 1888 with 1,200 pipes. The church was added to the National Register of Historic Places in 1983. The church closed in 2016, merging with First Parish, UU, in Beverly, MA.

== See also ==
- Bessie Monroe House, located behind the church
- First Church in Salem
- National Register of Historic Places listings in Salem, Massachusetts
- National Register of Historic Places listings in Essex County, Massachusetts
