= North Street Fire Station =

- U.S. National Register of Historic Places
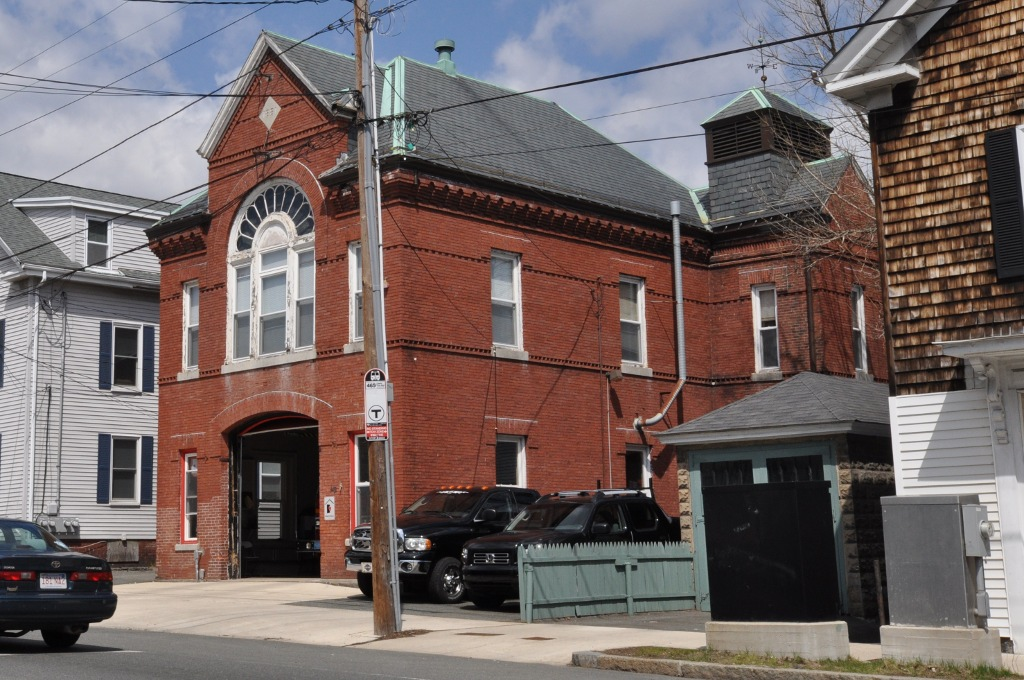

- Location within Massachusetts Location within the United States
- Location: Salem, Massachusetts
- Coordinates: 42°31′42″N 70°54′10″W
- Built: 1881
- Architect: Dennis, William
- Architectural style: Queen Anne
- NRHP reference No.: 13000050
- Added to NRHP: March 6, 2013

The North Street Fire Station is a historic fire station at 142 North Street on the north side of Salem, Massachusetts, and one of the oldest active service fire stations in the United States. The brick Queen Anne structure was built in 1881 to a design by local architect William Dennis, and is the oldest active fire station in the city. It was the second brick fire station built by the city, its design similar to the first one, built for ward 5 in 1880 and destroyed in the Great Salem Fire of 1914. The building as designed had a single bay to house a steamer, with space for stabling horses in the rear. The upper level included a wardroom, which made the station a center for social and civic functions, such as political meetings and elections.

The building was listed on the National Register of Historic Places in 2013.

== See also ==
- Central Fire Station (Taunton, Massachusetts), built 1867
- Peabody Central Fire Station, built 1873
- National Register of Historic Places listings in Salem, Massachusetts
- National Register of Historic Places listings in Essex County, Massachusetts
