= Thomas March Woodbridge House =

Historic house in Massachusetts, United States

- U.S. National Register of Historic Places
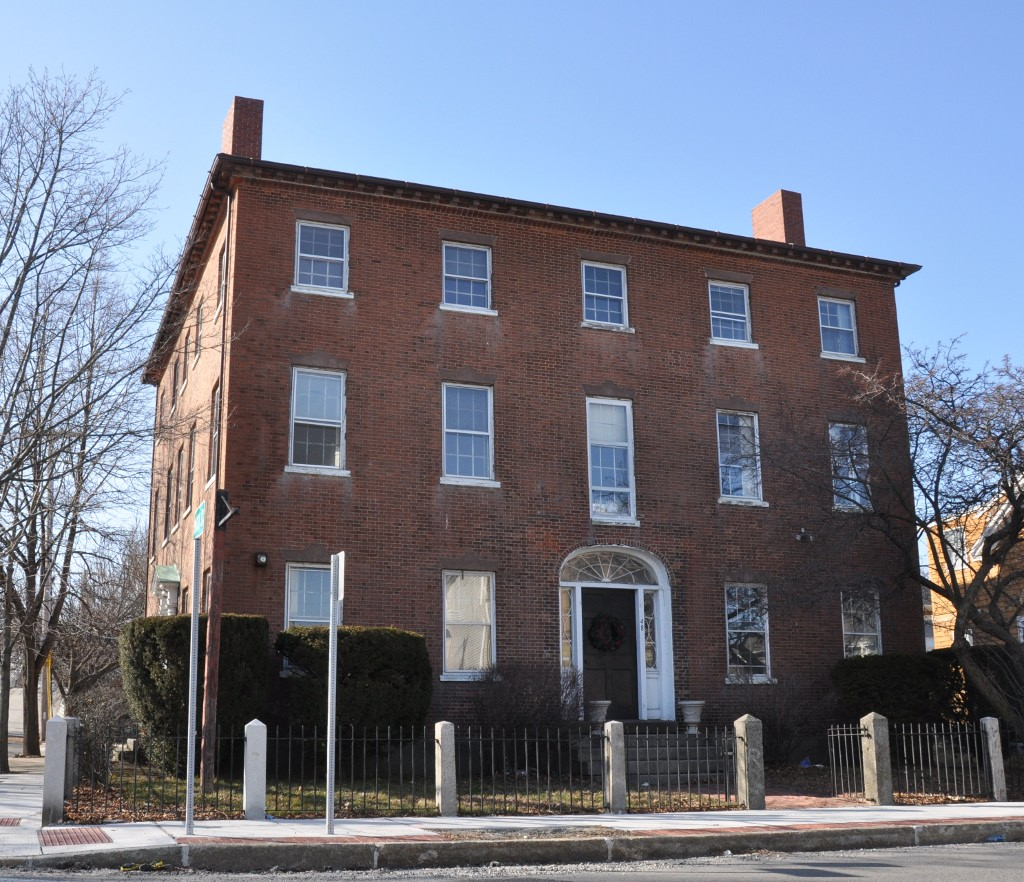

- Location within Massachusetts Location within the United States
- Location: Salem, Massachusetts
- Coordinates: 42°31′58″N 70°53′21″W
- Built: 1809
- Architect: McIntire, Samuel
- Architectural style: Federal
- NRHP reference No.: 75000304
- Added to NRHP: March 31, 1975

Thomas March Woodbridge House is a historic house at 48 Bridge Street in Salem, Massachusetts.

== Description and history ==
The three-story brick house was built in 1809 for Thomas March Woodbridge, owner of a local tannery. Its construction has been attributed to noted Salem builder Samuel McIntire, based on its similarity to other McIntire works. It is square, with five bays on each side. The front door is centered on the main facade topped by a semi-elliptical fanlight and flanked by sidelight windows. Entrances on the side elevations are sheltered by broken pediments supported by Doric columns.

Woodbridge died in 1822, after which the house went through a succession of owners. It was briefly owned by the Society for the Preservation of New England Antiquities (now Historic New England) before it was bought by Children's Friend and Family Service Society of the North Shore, Inc. in 1955. The building was listed on the National Register of Historic Places in 1975. The house stands just outside the Bridge Street Neck Historic District.

== See also ==
- List of historic houses in Massachusetts
- National Register of Historic Places listings in Salem, Massachusetts
