= Wesley Methodist Church (Salem, Massachusetts) =

Historic church in Massachusetts, United States

- U.S. National Register of Historic Places
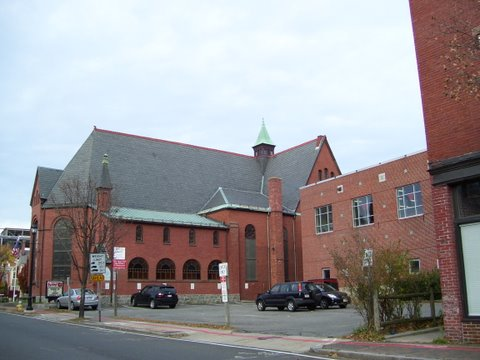

- Location within Massachusetts Location within the United States
- Location: Salem, Massachusetts
- Coordinates: 42°31′19″N 70°53′56″W
- Built: 1889
- Architect: Robert B. Valk, Robert G. Norton
- Architectural style: Romanesque
- MPS: Downtown Salem MRA
- NRHP reference No.: 83000588
- Added to NRHP: July 29, 1983

Wesley Methodist Church is a historic Methodist church at 8 North Street in Salem, Massachusetts. It is currently affiliated with the United Methodist denomination.

== History ==
According to the church:

Circuit Rider Jessie Lee came preaching the Gospel in Salem in the early 1800s. A small gathering of early Christians met in a storefront and sat on boxes to hear Jesus Christ proclaimed. They purchased the Harbor Street building and met for years until growth multipled the congregation. Wesley was built at 8 North street where 800 members worshiped regularly under the excellent ministry of outstanding pastors. In 1910 Lafayette St UMC moved to their new home at 296 Lafayette street until the 1994 merger [of Wesley Methodist Church and Lafayette Street United Methodist Church].

The current Romanesque church meeting house was completed in 1889. The building was added to the National Register of Historic Places in 1983.

== Visiting today ==
Today "Worship opportunities on Sunday morning include a half-hour communion service at 8 am and an hour-and-a-half, blended (traditional & contemporary) service at 9:45 am, all to the glory of God! The Praise Team gathers for a circle of prayer and rehearsal at 9 am, and scripture is read at 9:35 am to prepare hearts for worship."

== See also ==
- National Register of Historic Places listings in Salem, Massachusetts
- National Register of Historic Places listings in Essex County, Massachusetts
