= St. Nicholas Orthodox Church and Rectory =

Historic church in Massachusetts, United States

- U.S. National Register of Historic Places
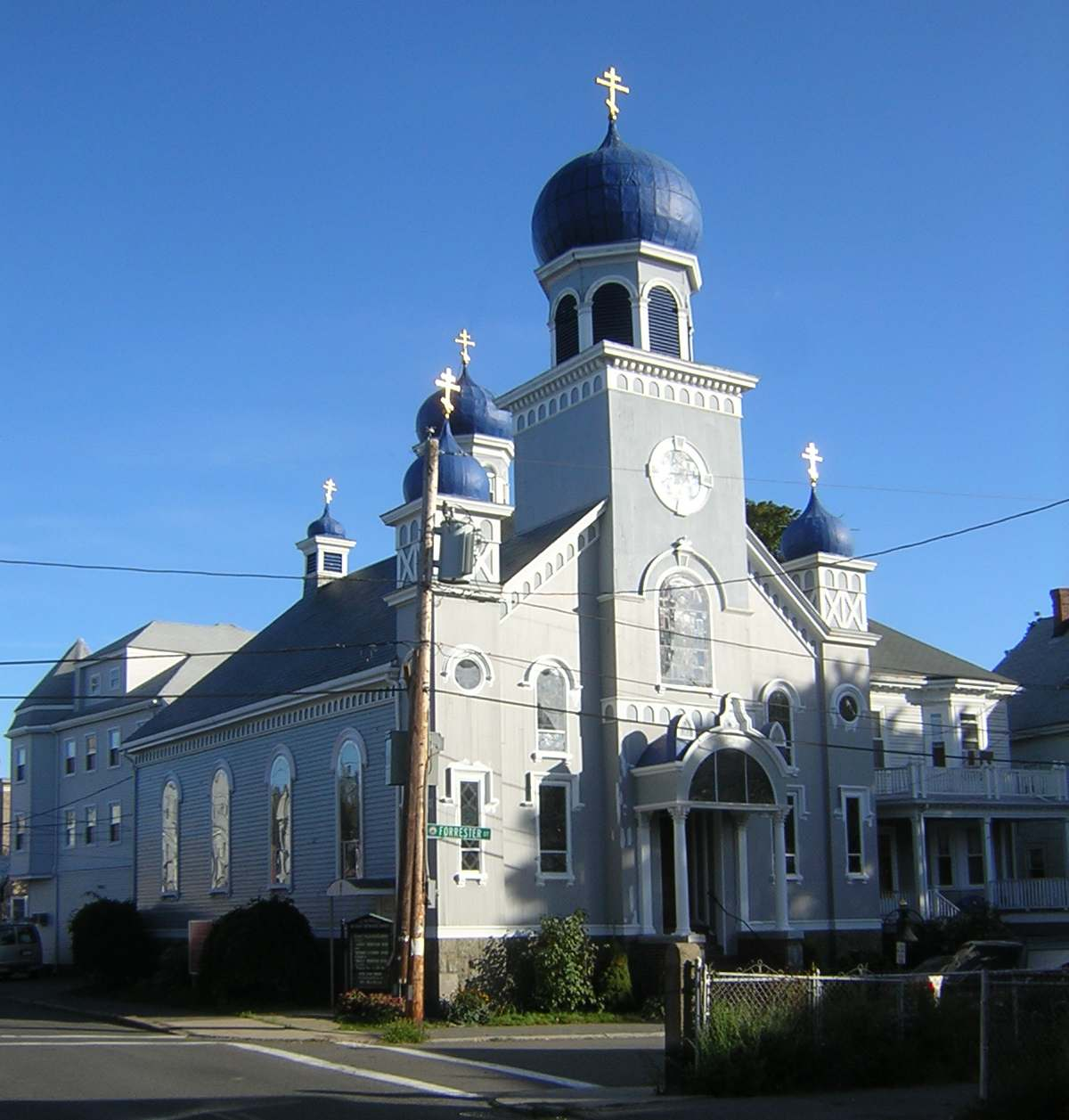

- Location within Massachusetts Location within the United States
- Location: Salem, Massachusetts
- Coordinates: 42°31′32″N 70°53′7″W
- Architect: William Devereaux Dennis
- Architectural style: Classical Revival, Late 19th And 20th Century Revivals
- NRHP reference No.: 93000346
- Added to NRHP: February 18, 1994

St. Nicholas Orthodox Church and Rectory is a historic church at 64-66 Forrester Street in Salem, Massachusetts. The parish now is under Diocese of New England of the Orthodox Church in America.

The church was built in 1908 for a congregation of immigrants from Galicia in Eastern Europe (now part of Western Ukraine and Poland) that had been established in 1901. The wood-frame building was designed by local architect William Devereaux Dennis. Its main facade is finished with flushboard siding, while the other elevations are sheathed in clapboards. The center of main facade is dominated by a tower that is initially square, but is topped by an octagonal belfry section and an onion dome with a cross-shaped spire. The facade is flanked by small square towers topped by onion domes. Behind the church stands a Colonial Revival rectory building that was built several years after the church.

The church was added to the National Register of Historic Places in 1994.

== See also ==
- National Register of Historic Places listings in Salem, Massachusetts
- National Register of Historic Places listings in Essex County, Massachusetts
