= Joseph Fenno House =

- Joseph Fenno House–Woman's Friend Society
- U.S. National Register of Historic Places
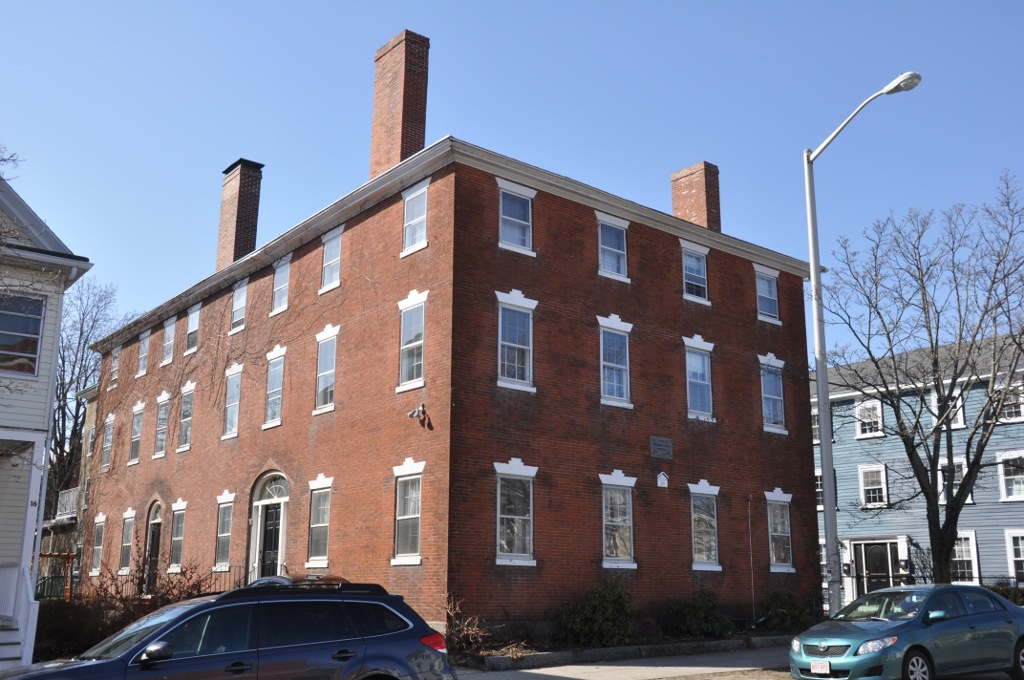

- Location within Massachusetts Location within the United States
- Location: 12–14 Hawthorne Blvd., Salem, Massachusetts
- Coordinates: 42°31′18″N 70°53′25″W
- Area: less than one acre
- Built: 1811
- Architect: Samuel Field McIntire
- Architectural style: Federal
- NRHP reference No.: 08000906
- Added to NRHP: September 17, 2008

The Joseph Fenno House–Woman's Friend Society is a historic building at 12–14 Hawthorne Boulevard in Salem, Massachusetts. The building was probably designed by Samuel Field McIntire, son of noted Salem building Samuel McIntire, and built 1811–12 for Joseph Fenno, a feltmaker turned merchant. The house was designed as a double house, although the reasons why Fenno wanted such a house are not known. He sold the property to his son in 1814 after moving to Columbia, Maine, and the two units were sold out of the family in 1822 and 1832.

Each half of the house then went through a succession of owners. The most notable of these was John Bertram, a wealthy merchant, railroad investor and philanthropist, who purchased the northern unit in 1879, and immediately arranged for its eventual donation to the Woman's Friend Society on behalf of his daughter, Jennie Emmerton. The society acquired full ownership of that unit in 1884, and purchased the southern unit in 1894. The property remains in the society's possession, and is used by it in the provision of its services.

The building was listed on the National Register of Historic Places on September 17, 2008.

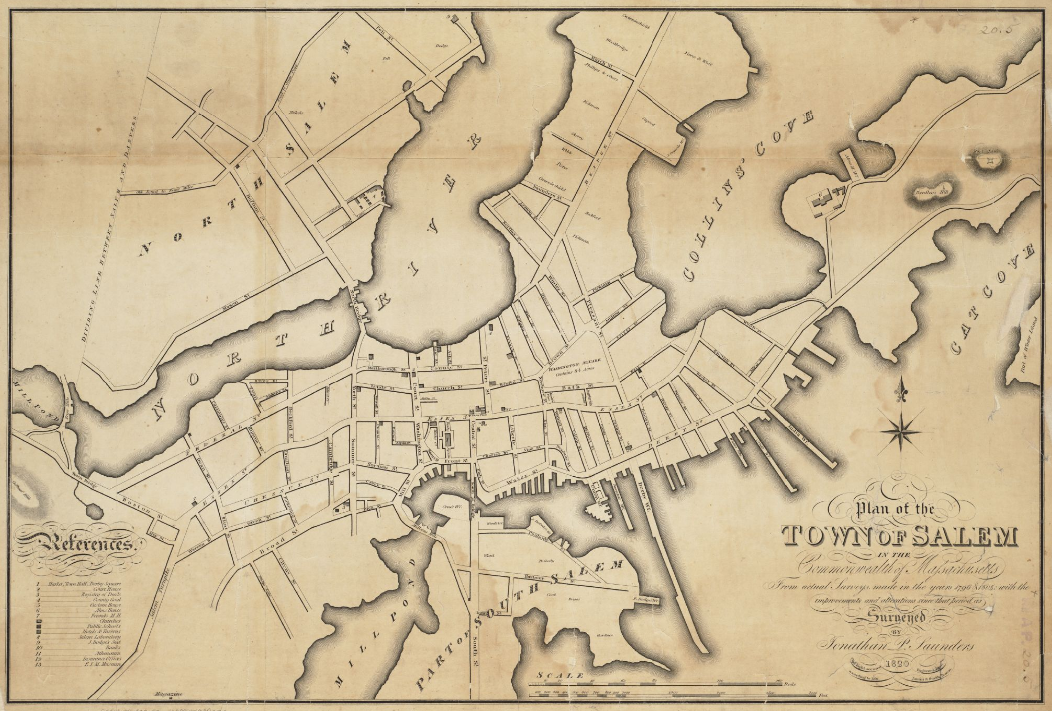
Salem, 1820

== See also ==
- List of historic houses in Massachusetts
- National Register of Historic Places listings in Salem, Massachusetts
- National Register of Historic Places listings in Essex County, Massachusetts
