= Bessie Monroe House =

Historic house in Massachusetts, United States

- U.S. National Register of Historic Places
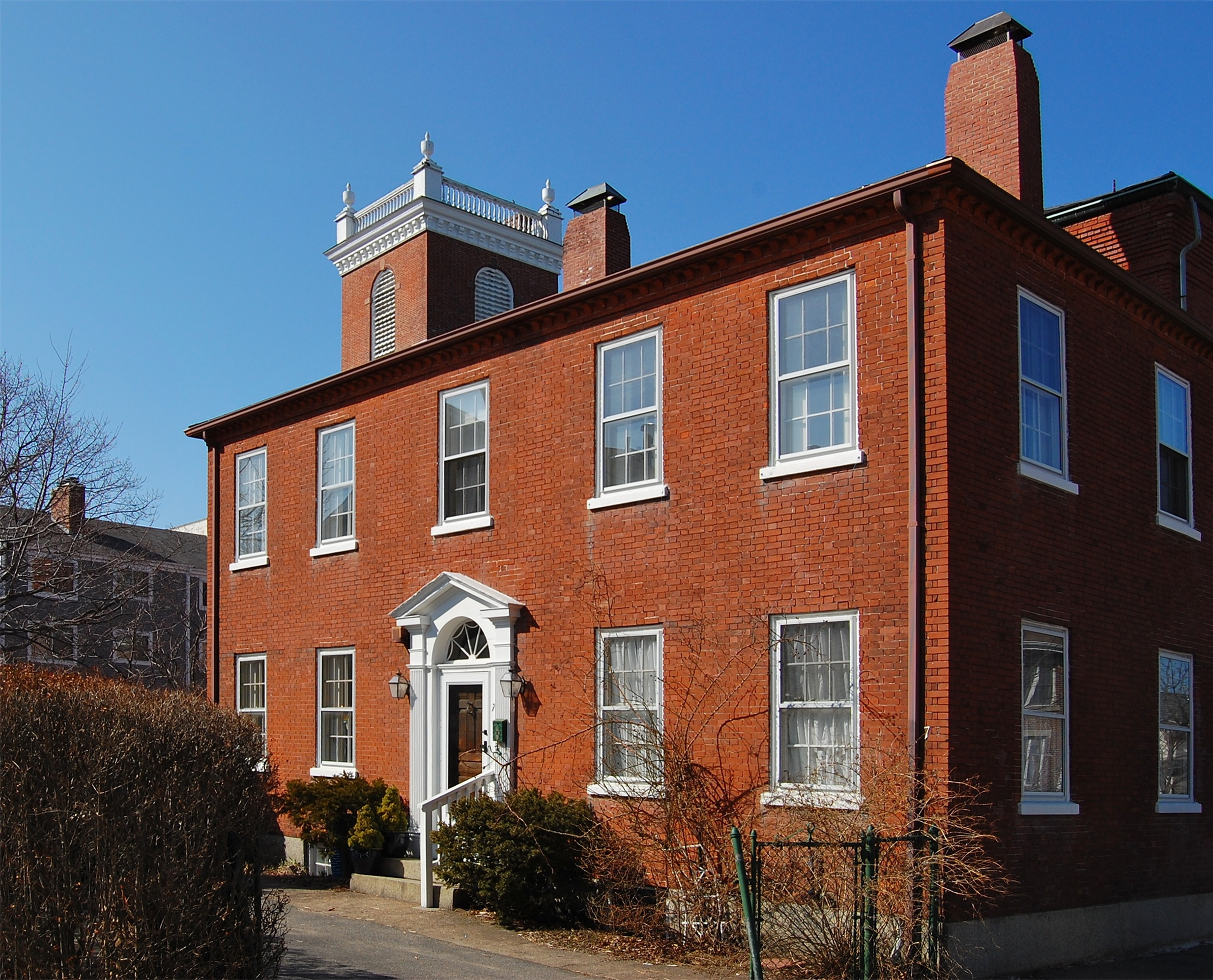
- Bessie Monroe House, with steeple of the First Universalist Church visible in background

- Location within Massachusetts Location within the United States
- Location: Salem, Massachusetts
- Coordinates: 42°31′25″N 70°53′43″W
- Built: 1811
- Architectural style: Federal
- MPS: Downtown Salem MRA
- NRHP reference No.: 83000580
- Added to NRHP: July 29, 1983

The Bessie Monroe House (also ''Munroe'') is a historic house at 7 Ash Street in Salem, Massachusetts. It is notable as a good example of a Federal style house, and for its survival from planned demolition during Salem's urban renewal of the area in the 1970s. The house, a modest two story brick house located just north of Salem's downtown, was built in 1811 for Thomas Perkins, a local merchant whose brother was its first occupant. When the city began urban renewal planning for the area in the 1960s, the building was occupied by an elderly lady named Bessie Monroe. Out of concerns for her health the city allowed her to remain in the property after its taking, and proceeded with plans that included the demolition of many surrounding properties. However, the delay occasioned by her occupation until her death in 1971 was accompanied by a shift in attitude in the city toward restoring such properties, and it was eventually sold to owners prepared to rehabilitate the property.

The house was listed on the National Register of Historic Places in 1983.

== See also ==
- National Register of Historic Places listings in Salem, Massachusetts
- National Register of Historic Places listings in Essex County, Massachusetts
- List of historic houses in Massachusetts
- Greenlawn Cemetery
