= National Register of Historic Places listings in Salem, Massachusetts =

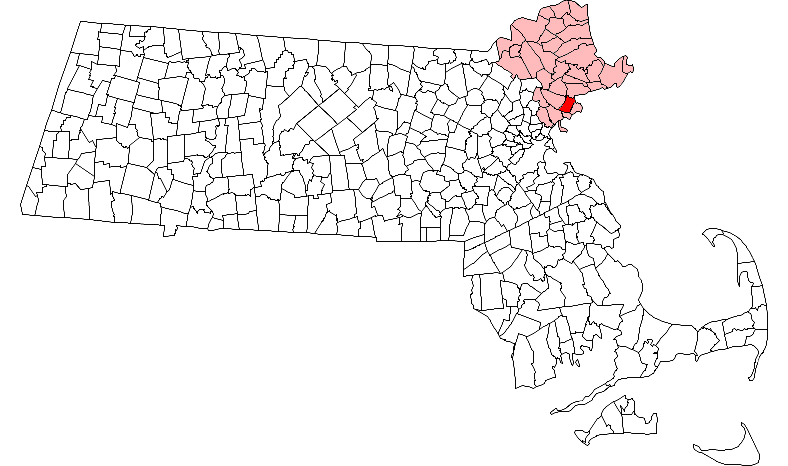
Location of Salem in Massachusetts

This is a list of the National Register of Historic Places listings in Salem, Massachusetts.

This is intended to be a complete list of the properties and districts on the National Register of Historic Places in Salem, Massachusetts, United States. The locations of National Register properties and districts for which the latitude and longitude coordinates are included below, may be seen in an online map.

Essex County, of which Salem is a part, is the location of more than 450 properties and districts listed on the National Register, including 25 National Historic Landmarks. Salem itself is the location of 46 of these properties and districts, including 8 National Historic Landmarks.

This National Park Service list is complete through NPS recent listings posted May 1, 2026.

== Current listings ==
	Name on the Register	Image	Date listed	Location	Description
1	Baker's Island Light Station	Baker's Island Light Station	November 21, 1976 (#76000289)	East of Salem on Baker's Island; 42°32′11″N 70°47′11″W	
2	Nathaniel Bowditch House	Nathaniel Bowditch House	October 15, 1966 (#66000135)	North St. 42°31′18″N 70°53′58″W	
3	Bowker Place	Bowker Place	July 29, 1983 (#83000573)	144-156 Essex St. 42°31′19″N 70°53′35″W	
4	Bridge Street Neck Historic District	Bridge Street Neck Historic District	July 19, 2002 (#02000790)	Bridge St. and side streets between March/Osgood Sts., and Howard/Webb Sts. 42°31′48″N 70°53′19″W	
5	Charter Street Historic District	Charter Street Historic District	March 10, 1975 (#75000294)	Bounded by Liberty, Derby, Central, and Charter Sts. 42°31′13″N 70°53′34″W	
6	Chestnut Street District	Chestnut Street District	August 28, 1973 (#73000312)	Bounded roughly by Broad, Flint, Federal, and Summer Sts.; also roughly bounded by Bridge, Lynn, Beckford, and River Sts. 42°31′13″N 70°54′08″W	Second set of addresses represent a boundary increase approved October 4, 1978.
7	Rufus Choate House	Rufus Choate House	November 12, 1982 (#82000481)	14 Lynde St. 42°31′21″N 70°53′48″W	
8	City Hall	City Hall	April 3, 1973 (#73000316)	93 Washington St. 42°31′19″N 70°53′45″W	
9	Crombie Street District	Crombie Street District	September 16, 1983 (#83000575)	7-15 and 16-18 Crombie St., and 13 Barton St. 42°31′14″N 70°53′52″W	
10	Derby Waterfront District	Derby Waterfront District	May 17, 1976 (#76000297)	Derby St. from Herbert St. to Block House Sq., waterfront streets between Kosciusko and Blaney Sts. 42°31′18″N 70°53′06″W	
11	Derby Wharf Light Station	Derby Wharf Light Station	June 15, 1987 (#87001466)	Derby Wharf; 42°30′52″N 70°53′04″W	
12	Downtown Salem District	Downtown Salem District	December 4, 1972 (#72000149)	Derby Sq. and 215-231 Essex, 121-145 Washington, and 6-34 Front Sts.; also roughly bounded by Church, Central, New Derby, and Washington Sts. 42°31′16″N 70°53′45″W	Originally listed as the Old Town Hall Historic District; new name and boundaries represent a boundary increase of October 18, 1983
13	Essex Institute Historic District	Essex Institute Historic District	June 22, 1972 (#72000147)	134-132, 128, 126 Essex St. and 13 Washington Sq., W. 42°31′20″N 70°53′33″W	
14	Federal Street District	Federal Street District	May 17, 1976 (#76000299)	32 Federal St.; also roughly bounded by Bridge, Washington, Federal, and Summer Sts. 42°31′22″N 70°53′52″W	Originally listed as the Essex County Court Buildings; new name and boundaries represent a boundary increase of September 16, 1983
15	Joseph Fenno House-Woman's Friend Society	Joseph Fenno House-Woman's Friend Society	September 17, 2008 (#08000906)	12-14 Hawthorne Boulevard; 42°31′18″N 70°53′25″W	
16	First Universalist Church	First Universalist Church	July 29, 1983 (#83000577)	6 Rust St. 42°31′26″N 70°53′44″W	
17	Fort Lee	Fort Lee	April 14, 1994 (#94000285)	Fort Ave. 42°31′55″N 70°52′28″W	
18	Fort Pickering	Fort Pickering	February 8, 1973 (#73000320)	Winter Island; 42°31′36″N 70°54′02″W	
19	Gardiner-Pingree House	Gardiner-Pingree House	December 30, 1970 (#70000541)	128 Essex St. 42°31′21″N 70°53′31″W	
20	Gedney and Cox Houses	Gedney and Cox Houses	October 1, 1974 (#74000389)	21 High St. 42°31′06″N 70°53′53″W	
21	Greenlawn Cemetery	Greenlawn Cemetery	July 27, 2015 (#15000467)	57 Orne St. 42°31′58″N 70°54′15″W	
22	Hamilton Hall	Hamilton Hall	December 30, 1970 (#70000543)	9 Cambridge St. 42°31′10″N 70°53′58″W	
23	House of the Seven Gables Historic District	House of the Seven Gables Historic District	May 8, 1973 (#73000323)	54 Turner St. at Derby and Hardy Sts. 42°31′18″N 70°53′22″W	
24	Bessie Monroe House	Bessie Monroe House	July 29, 1983 (#83000580)	7 Ash St. 42°31′25″N 70°53′43″W	
25	William Murray House	William Murray House	March 9, 1990 (#90000257)	39 Essex St. 42°31′24″N 70°53′10″W	
26	North Street Fire Station	North Street Fire Station	March 6, 2013 (#13000050)	142 North St. 42°31′42″N 70°54′10″W	In 1881, the North Street Fire Station was built..
27	Peabody Museum of Salem	Peabody Museum of Salem	October 15, 1966 (#66000783)	161 Essex St. 42°31′18″N 70°53′36″W	This listing is for the East India Marine Hall, now a portion of the Peabody Essex Museum.
28	John P. Peabody House	John P. Peabody House	July 29, 1983 (#83000581)	15 Summer St. 42°31′13″N 70°53′56″W	
29	Peirce-Nichols House	Peirce-Nichols House	November 24, 1968 (#68000041)	80 Federal St. 42°31′22″N 70°54′00″W	Owned by the Peabody Essex Museum.
30	Point Neighborhood Historic District	Point Neighborhood Historic District	December 2, 2014 (#14000972)	Roughly bounded by Peabody, Congress, Chase & Lafayette Sts. 42°31′00″N 70°53′29″W	
31	St. Nicholas Orthodox Church and Rectory	St. Nicholas Orthodox Church and Rectory	February 18, 1994 (#93000346)	64-66 Forrester St. 42°31′32″N 70°53′07″W	
32	Salem Common Historic District	Salem Common Historic District	May 12, 1976 (#76000303)	Bounded roughly by St. Peter's, Bridge, and Derby Sts. and Collins Cove; 42°31′22″N 70°53′28″W	
33	Salem Diner	Salem Diner	September 22, 1999 (#99001118)	70½ Loring Ave. 42°30′04″N 70°53′47″W	
34	Salem Laundry	Salem Laundry	July 29, 1983 (#83000583)	55 Lafayette St. 42°31′12″N 70°53′38″W	Misspelled as "Landry" on the National Register
35	Salem Maritime National Historic Site	Salem Maritime National Historic Site	October 15, 1966 (#66000048)	Derby St. 42°31′09″N 70°53′10″W	
36	Salem Willows Historic District	Salem Willows Historic District	March 25, 1994 (#94000265)	Roughly Columbus, Bay View, Beach and Fort Aves. 42°31′57″N 70°52′06″W	
37	Shepard Block	Shepard Block	July 29, 1983 (#83000584)	298-304 Essex St. 42°31′17″N 70°53′57″W	
38	Joseph Story House	Joseph Story House	November 7, 1973 (#73001952)	26 Winter St. 42°31′29″N 70°53′27″W	
39	US Post Office-Salem Main	US Post Office-Salem Main	June 4, 1986 (#86001211)	2 Margin St. 42°31′10″N 70°53′47″W	
40	John Ward House	John Ward House	November 24, 1968 (#68000045)	132 Essex St. 42°31′22″N 70°53′36″W	
41	Joshua Ward House	Joshua Ward House	February 8, 1978 (#78000481)	148 Washington St. 42°31′13″N 70°53′48″W	
42	Wesley Methodist Church	Wesley Methodist Church	July 29, 1983 (#83000588)	8 North St. 42°31′19″N 70°53′56″W	
43	West Cogswell House	West Cogswell House	July 29, 1983 (#83000589)	5-9 Summer St. 42°31′15″N 70°53′56″W	
44	Winter Island Historic District and Archeological District	Winter Island Historic District and Archeological District	April 14, 1994 (#94000335)	Winter Island; 42°31′42″N 70°52′09″W	
45	Thomas March Woodbridge House	Thomas March Woodbridge House	March 31, 1975 (#75000304)	48 Bridge St. 42°31′58″N 70°53′21″W	
46	YMCA	YMCA	July 29, 1983 (#83000590)	284-296 Essex St. 42°31′17″N 70°53′55″W	

== See also ==
- List of National Historic Landmarks in Massachusetts
- National Register of Historic Places listings in Essex County, Massachusetts
- National Register of Historic Places listings in Massachusetts
