= First Church in Salem =

- First Church in Salem, Unitarian
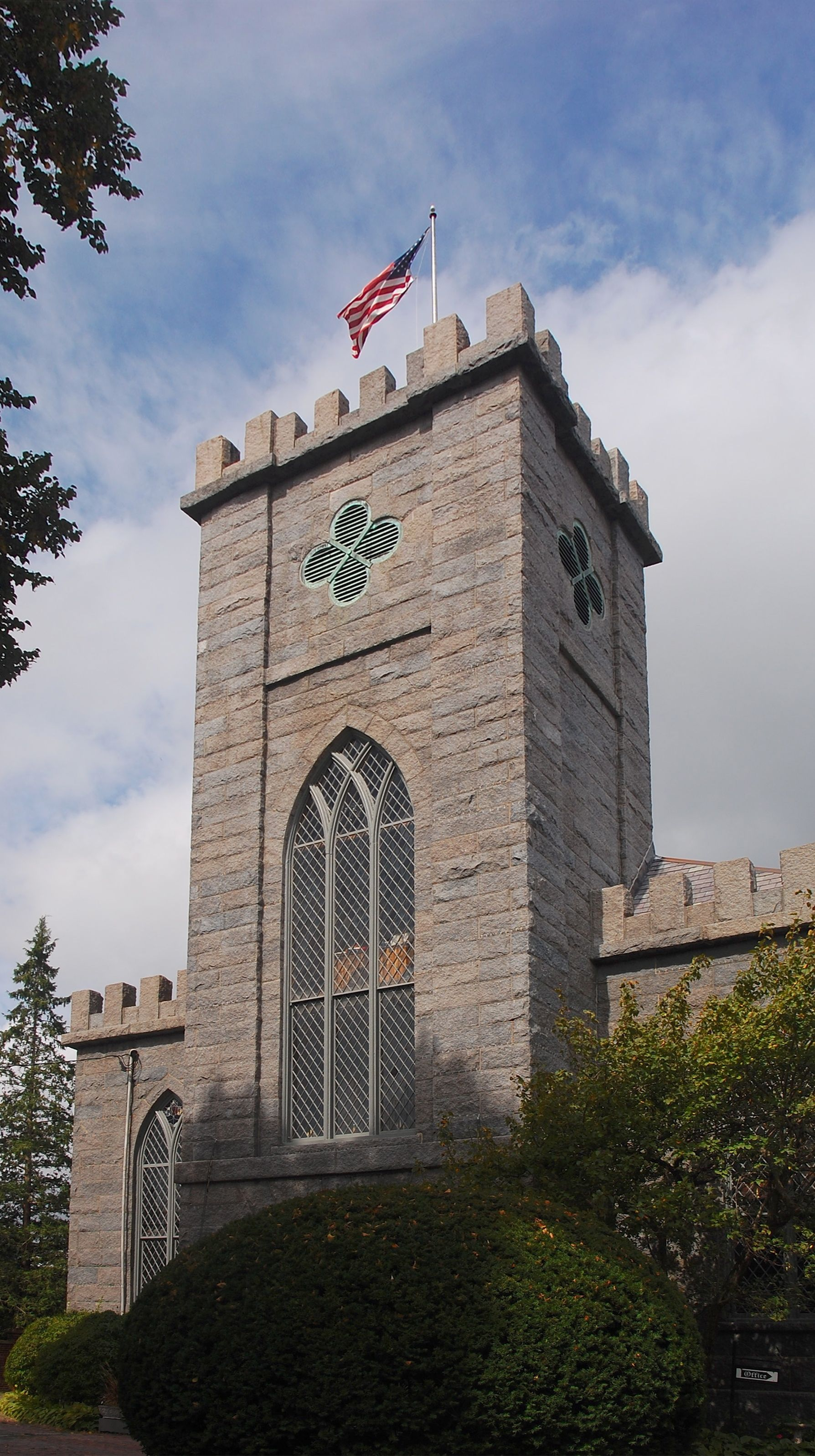
- Pictured in 2010
- First Church in Salem
- 42.5215°N 70.8994°W
- Location: Salem, Massachusetts
- Country: United States
- Denomination: Unitarian Universalism
- Previous denomination: Puritanism
- Website: Official website

Architecture
- Architect: Solomon Willard
- Architectural type: Gothic Revival
- Completed: 1836

First Church in Salem (officially known as the First Church in Salem, Unitarian Universalist) is a Unitarian Universalist church in Salem, Massachusetts that was designed by Solomon Willard and built in 1836.

== History ==
Before the church was built, around 1635, its members had to gather in houses or a building near the Town House Square. The congregation claims to be "one of the oldest continuing Protestant churches in North America and the first to be governed by congregational polity, a central feature of Unitarian Universalism".

The values of the Puritans who founded the First Church in Salem stated that they were on a pilgrimage to the city of God. This made them want to perfect their world and community. It also made some of their members such as third minister Roger Williams, activists in the community. He specifically argued that Native Americans should be compensated for their land and that the colonial government should not have power over the church.

Thomas Treadwell Stone became minister of the church on July 12, 1846. In December 1851, the Salem Female Anti-Slavery Society held their annual general meeting at the church. For twelve years, Charles Wentworth Upham was minister of the church. Grace Parker commissioned a stained-glass window for the church in dedication to her late husband, George Swinnerton Parker of Parker Brothers fame, and their two sons.

== See also ==
- First Universalist Church (Salem, Massachusetts)
