= Bowker Place =

- U.S. National Register of Historic Places
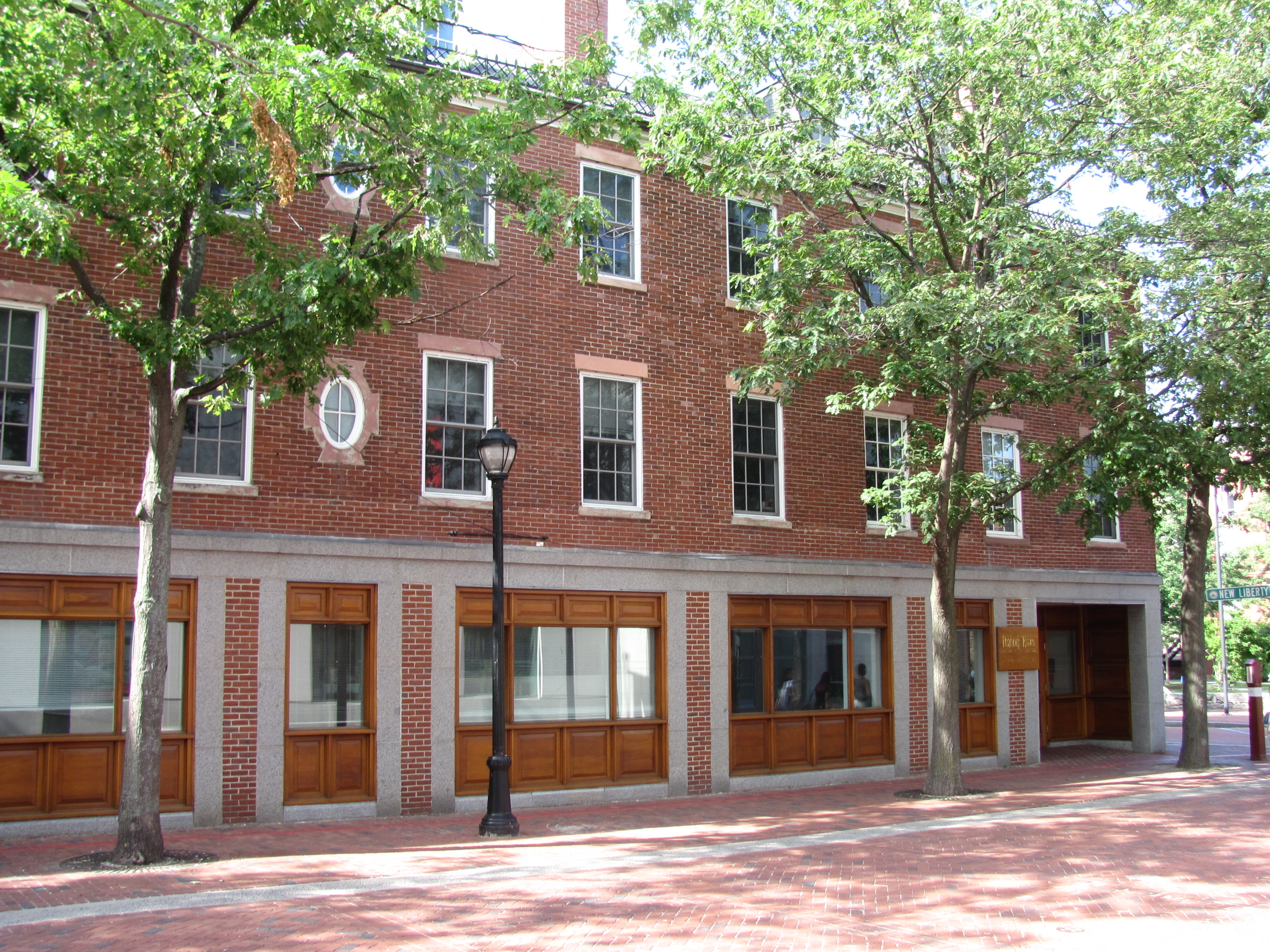
- Bowker Place

- Location within Massachusetts Location within the United States
- Location: Salem, Massachusetts
- Coordinates: 42°31′19″N 70°53′35″W
- Built: 1830
- Architectural style: Greek Revival
- MPS: Downtown Salem MRA
- NRHP reference No.: 83000573
- Added to NRHP: July 29, 1983

Bowker Place is a historic commercial building at 144–156 Essex Street in Salem, Massachusetts. Built in 1830 by William Manning, this handsome two-story Greek Revival brick building has had a significant role in the civic and economic history of Salem. It was acquired by Joel Bowker in 1844 after Manning went bankrupt. Its tenants have included banks, insurance companies, and the Salem Police Court. One prominent retailer who began operations in this building was William Filene, founder of the Filene's department store chain.

The building was listed on the National Register of Historic Places in 1983. It is immediately adjacent to portions of the Downtown Salem District.

== See also ==
- National Register of Historic Places listings in Salem, Massachusetts
- National Register of Historic Places listings in Essex County, Massachusetts
