= Thomas Treadwell Stone =

American minister and abolitionist (1801–1895)

- Born: February 9, 1801; Waterford, Maine, US
- Died: November 13, 1895 (aged 94); Bolton, Massachusetts, US
- Resting place: Harmony Grove Cemetery, Salem, Massachusetts
- Education: Bowdoin College
- Occupation: Minister
- Children: 12, inc. Alfred and William

Thomas Treadwell Stone (February 9, 1801 – November 13, 1895) was an American Unitarian pastor, abolitionist, and Transcendentalist. He preached notable anti-slavery sermons at parishes in Maine and Massachusetts, including at First Church in Salem.

== Life and work ==
Thomas Treadwell Stone was born on February 9, 1801, in Waterford, Maine, to Solomon Stone and Hepzibah Treadwell Stone. His maternal grandfather, Thomas Treadwell, served with the Minutemen and was at the battle of Bunker Hill with Colonel William Prescott's regiment. At that time Waterford was an area of new and sparsely populated farmland, and Solomon Stone made his living as a farmer.

Thomas attended Bridgton Academy and graduated from Bowdoin College in 1820.

== Early career and marriage ==
Thomas married Laura Elizabeth Poor in January 1825 in Andover, Maine. Laura's brother Henry Varnum Poor was a financial analyst and founder of H.V. and H.W. Poor Co., which later evolved into Standard & Poor's. Thomas and Laura's marriage produced 7 sons (Thomas, Walter, Henry, Lincoln, Alfred, George, and William) and five daughters (two Lauras, Mary, Martha, and Elizabeth).

After studying theology and performing missionary work in Oxford County, Maine, Stone was ordained and settled at the Orthodox Congregational Church in Andover, a traditional Congregational church. In this most northwesterly town then organized in Maine, he served under a Dr. Tappan from 1824 to 1830. From 1830 to 1832 he headed Bridgton Academy in Maine. Among his students was John Albion Andrew, a radical abolitionist who went on to serve as Governor of Massachusetts during the Civil War years.

== Ministry and anti-slavery beliefs ==
From 1832 to 1846 Stone and his family resided in East Machias, Maine, where he was pastor of the Union Church. As evident from his writing and lectures during this time, Stone became an early convert to abolitionism. As early as the 1830s, he was exhorting his congregation that slavery was a national problem. "It was the duty of all Christians," Stone proclaimed, "to do our utmost in resisting [slavery], through the Spirit of Christ." East Machias was home to many intellectuals at that time, and his church members included many who later took on theological leadership positions in New England educational institutions. Among them were Samuel Harris (president of Bowdoin College and professor of theology at Yale Divinity School), Roswell Dwight Hitchcock (president of Union Theological Seminary), Ezra Abbot (Harvard Divinity School), George Harris (Andover Theological School), and Arlo Bates (professor at MIT). Stone lectured for the New England Anti-Slavery Society, and was a delegate to the 1839 annual meeting of that group.

Stone's sermon The Martyr of Freedom, a discourse delivered at East Machias, in 1837, condemned the killing of Elijah Lovejoy, a Presbyterian minister who edited anti-slavery newspapers in Missouri until mobs smashed his presses. Lovejoy was killed during an attempt to burn his office in Alton, Illinois. In his sermon Stone urged his listeners to "proclaim the truth of slavery, not only to peers, but to the slaveholder." Slavery, he stated, not only destroys those who witness truth but the nation and slaveholder as well.

These strong abolitionist viewpoints led to Stone's ousting as a Congregationalist minister in 1844. In 1846 he moved his family from Maine to Massachusetts to become pastor of the Unitarian First Church of Salem, where he served until 1852. During this period, he continued to demonstrate anti-slavery beliefs, as evidenced by frequent visits by the elite of the movement, including Amos Bronson Alcott, Ralph Waldo Emerson, John Greenleaf Whittier, William Lloyd Garrison, and Wendell Phillips.

Reactions among many New Englanders to the passage of the Fugitive Slave Act of 1850 was mixed, but to those who opposed slavery it was fierce. Discontent among Stone's parishioners at First Church in Salem rose as he became more involved with the fugitive slave issue. In August 1851, Stone was formally terminated. His fate was similar to other New England theologians, many who resigned or were dismissed for supporting the anti-slavery cause.

In December 1851 Stone addressed the Salem Female Anti-Slavery Society, of which his wife, Laura Poor Stone, was a member. An abolition quilt she created there is owned by the Peabody Essex Museum. During this last recorded public address, he emphasized that slavery was irreconcilable with man being created in God's image, and urged his listeners to know the effects of slavery and pray for its end. During this speech he acknowledged the sadness and pains suffered by the anti-slavery community by being rejected, denounced and ridiculed by friends, family and church, and thanked them for standing firm for the cause. Stone and his family moved to Bolton, Massachusetts in November 1852 where he became the 7th minister of the First Parish of Bolton. In 1859 Stone and his wife Laura moved to Brooklyn, Connecticut, where he became pastor of the Unitarian Universalist Church in 1860.

== Transcendentalism ==
Although he was lesser-known than other New England Transcendentalists, Stone "had religious, literary, and reform connections to nearly all of the major Transcendentalists and contributed to The Dial magazine during the early 1840s." Stone's essay "Man and the Ages" was included in the January 1841 issue, and his "Calvinist's Letter" was published a year later. Amos Bronson Alcott recorded him as a member of the Transcendental Club, but it is unknown which meetings he may have attended.

== Final years ==
In 1866 Stone received a Doctor of Divinity degree from Bowdoin, his alma mater. During his later years he preached and lectured at lyceums occasionally. Stone returned to Bolton in 1871 where he spent his final years writing. He died in Bolton in November 1895. The funeral was held at the First Church of Salem, and he and his wife are buried in Harmony Grove Cemetery in Salem.

== Family ==
During the American Civil War, four of Stone's sons enlisted in the Army of the Potomac, three at the war's outset and one later. His son William was wounded at Antietam in September 1862, and again at Gettysburg in 1863 as a soldier with the 19th Massachusetts. After the war, William was appointed to the Freedmen's Bureau in March 1866, "probably because of his whole-hearted commitment to black rights". William also served briefly as the Attorney General for South Carolina. Thomas's son Lincoln Ripley Stone, served a surgeon in the 54th Massachusetts Infantry Regiment, the nation's first Black army regiment. He later practiced medicine in Newton, Massachusetts. Son George Herbert Stone served as a private in Co. I, 38th Regiment Massachusetts Volunteer Infantry, and died in service in Baton Rouge, Louisiana, in 1863. Son Henry served as 2nd lieutenant in the 1st Wisconsin Volunteers and later as lieutenant colonel of the 100th U.S. Colored Troops. His son Alfred was a noted architect in Providence, Rhode Island.

== Works/sermons (partial list) ==
- Stone, Thomas Treadwell; H. King (1831). An Address on the Introduction of Historical Studies into the Course of Common Education : Delivered before Oxford County Lyceum. Paris, Maine: H. King. OCLC 20902179.
- Stone, Thomas Treadwell (1837). Christianity Fitted for Universal Diffusion : a Sermon, Delivered in North Yarmouth, June 28, 1837, before the Maine Missionary Society, at Its Thirtieth Anniversary. Portland, Maine: Merrill and Byram. OCLC 10579951.
- Stone, Thomas Treadwell (1829). Influence of Intemperance on the Moral Sensibility: An Address Delivered at the Organization of the Oxford Temperance Society, Norway, July 1, 1829. Norway, Maine: Goodnow & Phelps. OCLC 3408615.
- Stone, Thomas Treadwell (1856). The Rod and the Staff. Boston. OCLC 191063884.
- Stone, Thomas Treadwell (1838). The Martyr of Freedom: a discourse delivered at East Machias, November 30, and at Machias, December 7, 1837. Boston: Isaac Knapp.
- Stone, Thomas Treadwell (1872). Roger Williams, the prophetic legislator, a paper read before the Rhode Island historical society, November 8, 1871. Providence: A. C. Greene.
