= West Cogswell House =

Historic house in Massachusetts, United States

- U.S. National Register of Historic Places
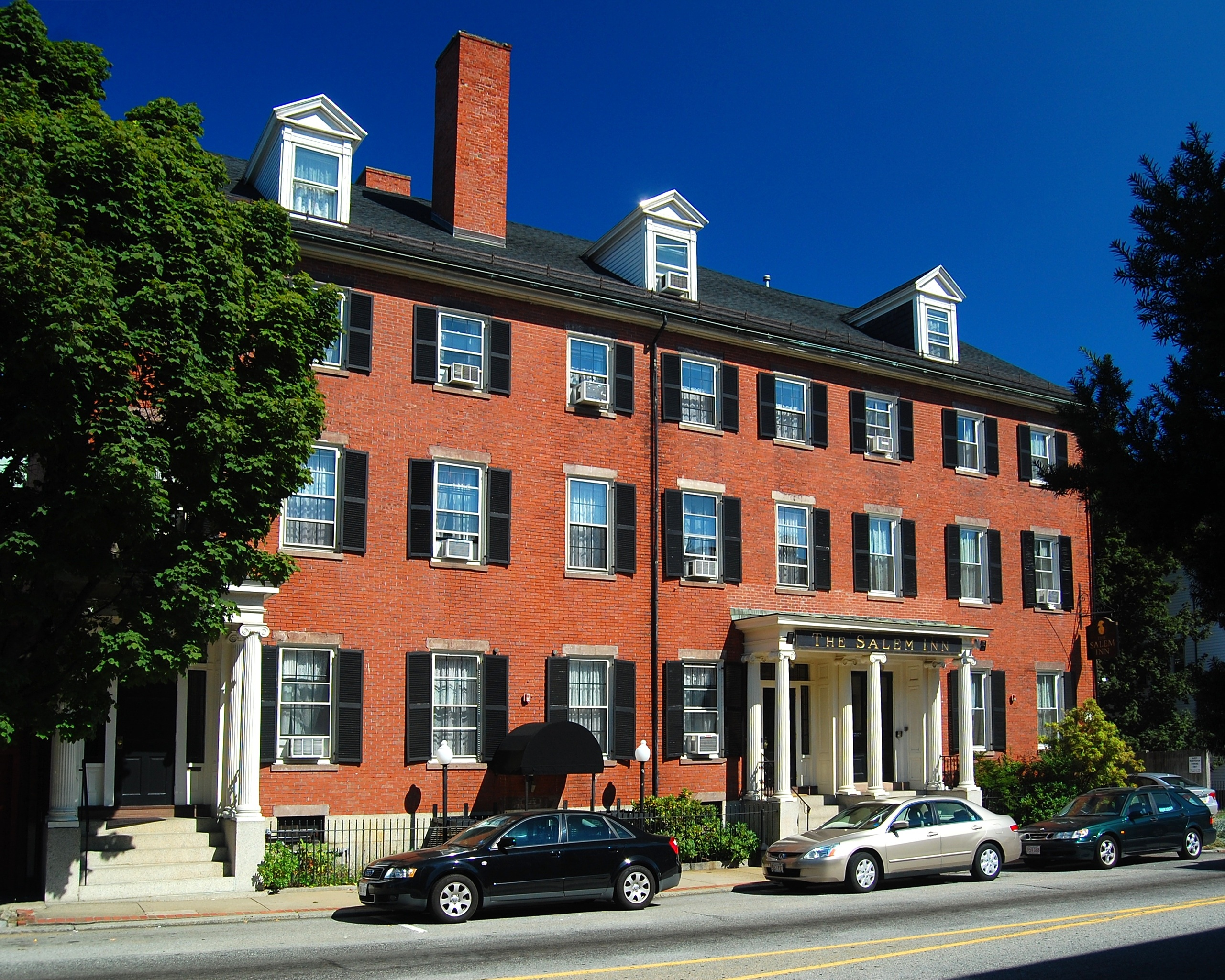
- The duplex Federal style buildings are now owned by the Salem Inn

- Location within Massachusetts Location within the United States
- Location: Salem, Massachusetts
- Coordinates: 42°31′15″N 70°53′56″W
- Built: 1834
- Architectural style: Greek Revival
- MPS: Downtown Salem MRA
- NRHP reference No.: 83000589
- Added to NRHP: July 29, 1983

The West Cogswell House is a historic house at 5-9 Summer Street in Salem, Massachusetts. It is an example of the Greek Revival style of architecture that was common in 19th century Salem.

The house is a group of three brick Greek Revival rowhouses that were built in 1834 by Nathaniel West, one of Salem's leading sea captains and merchants. Each building is three window bays wide, with a recessed side entry framed by a wooden portico; the right two unit entries are adjacent, and sheltered by a single portico. The buildings were at one time the home of American Civil War general, and later Mayor of Salem William Cogswell.

The building was added to the National Register of Historic Places in 1983. It is now operated as a hotel called the Salem Inn, which also owns the nearby John P. Peabody House.

== See also ==
- List of historic houses in Massachusetts
- National Register of Historic Places listings in Salem, Massachusetts
- National Register of Historic Places listings in Essex County, Massachusetts

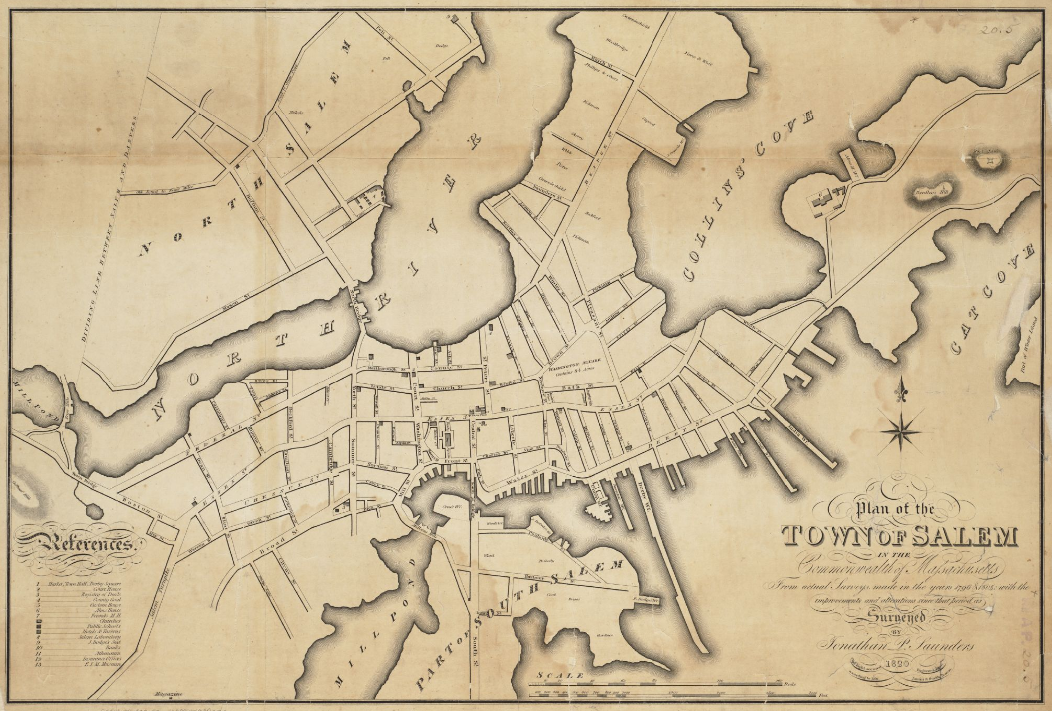
Salem - 1820
