= Yachting (magazine) =

English-language magazine

- Cover of issue 1402
- Editor: Patrick Sciacca
- Frequency: Monthly
- Publisher: David Carr
- Total circulation: 121,453 (December 2012)
- Founder: Oswald Garrison Villard
- Founded: 1907
- Company: Firecrown
- Country: United States
- Based in: New York City
- Language: English
- Website: www.yachtingmagazine.com
- ISSN: 0043-9940

Yachting is a monthly English-language magazine published since 1907. It was founded by Oswald Garrison Villard, publisher of the New York Evening Post and The Nation.

== Early history ==
On January 1, 1907, publisher Oswald Garrison Villard released the first issue of Yachting. A year later he appointed his “schoolmate and lifelong friend”, 37-year-old Herbert L. Stone, as the magazine's second editor. Stone continued as the editor through a series of ownership changes, except for a brief period during World War I when Stone went to war and Wililam Atkin took over.

In 1920 Herbert Stone, Albert Britt and William A. Miles purchased the magazine from Mr. Villard, and sold it to John Clarke Kennedy a few years later. In 1938 Stone and some friends assembled the Yachting Publishing Company, and took on the role of president, publisher, and editor. He served as editor until his retirement in 1952, and remained as publisher and president of the corporation until his death in 1955.

== Content ==
Yachting features articles on sailing and powerboating. Most of the editorial content covers new marine products and developments, a calendar of races and lists of yacht brokerages.

The magazine is published by Firecrown. The editorial offices are in New York, NY, USA.

== Publishers ==
Dates	Publisher
1938 – 1977	Yachting Publishing Corporation
1977 – 1985	Ziff Davis
1985 – 1987	CBS Magazines
1987	Diamandis Communications
1987 – 2000	Times Mirror Company
2000 – 2007	Time Inc.
2007 – 2023	Bonnier
2023 – present	Firecrown
