= Mansion =

Large and expensive dwelling house

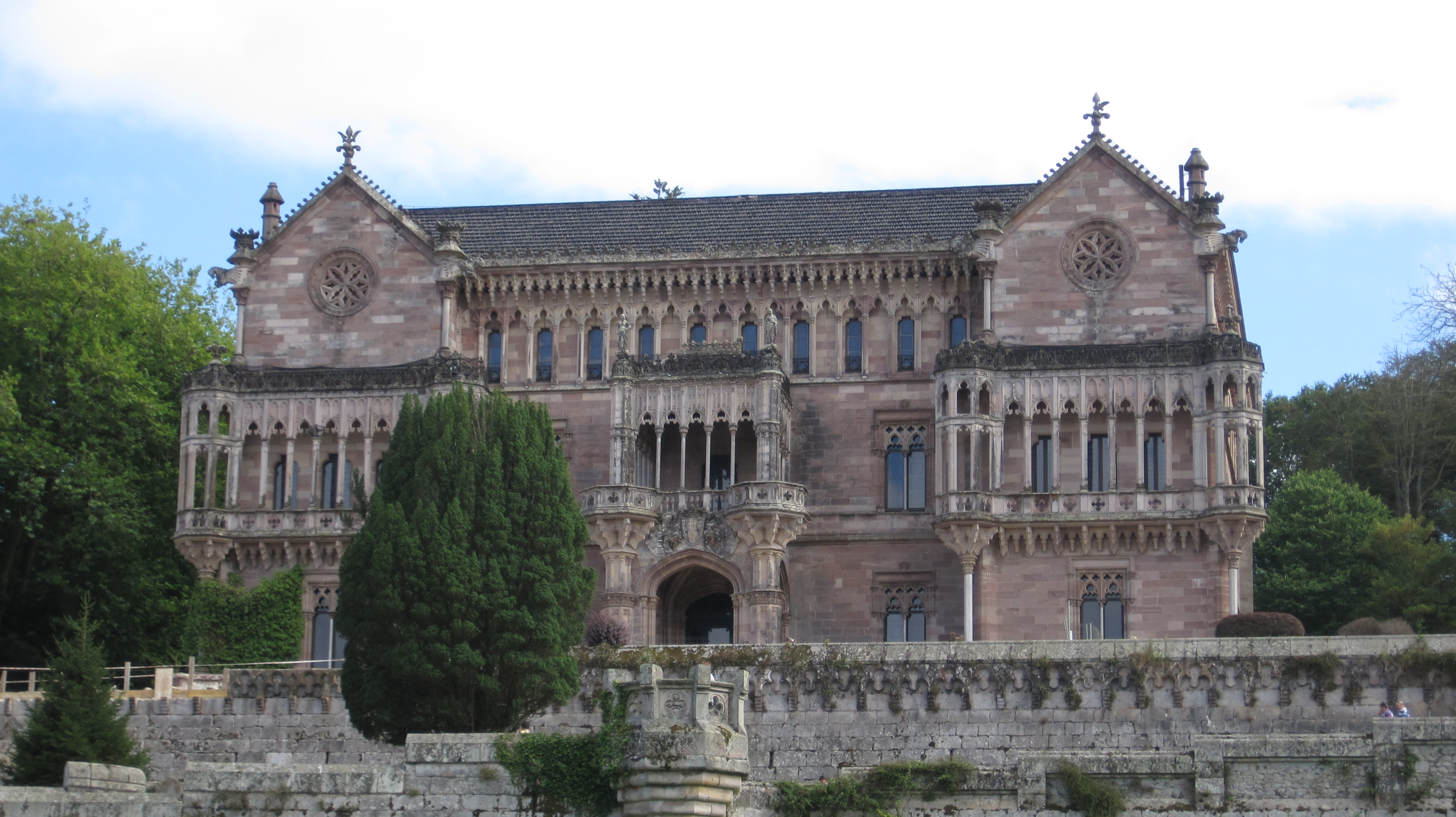
A Neo-Gothic mansion in Comillas (Cantabria), Spain

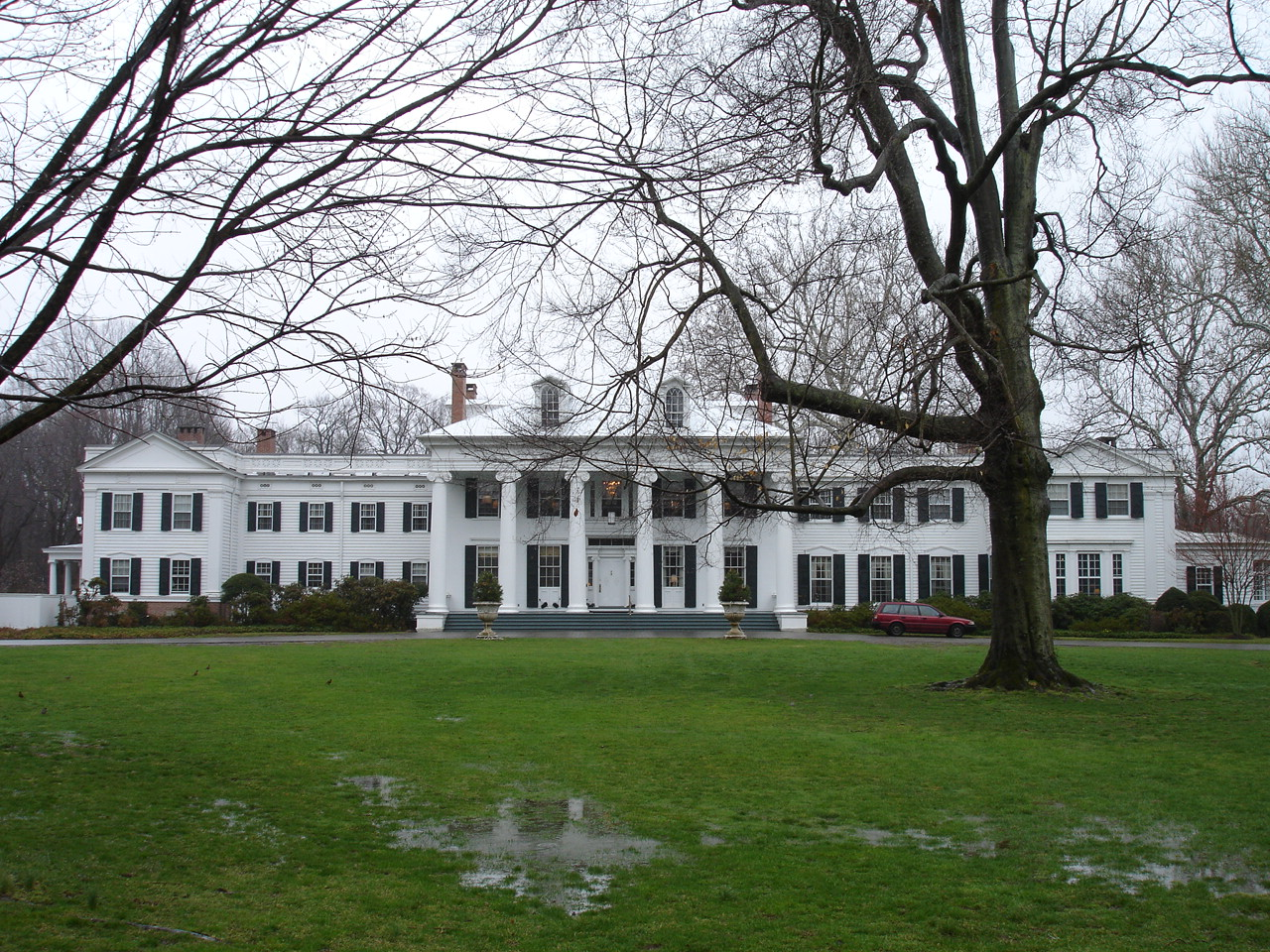
Drumthwacket, the official mansion of residence for the governor of New Jersey

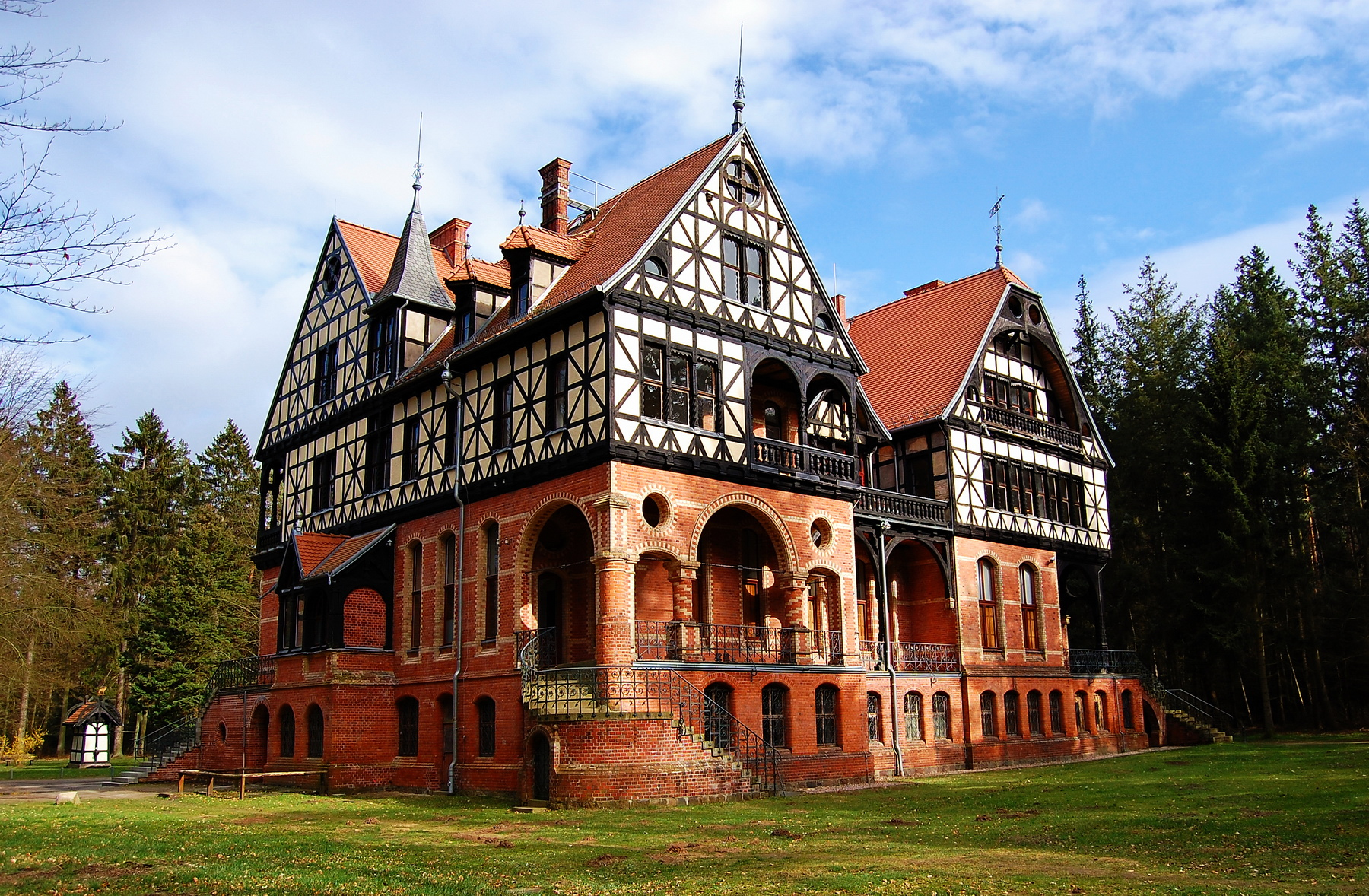
Gelbensande Manor, an 1885 Gründerzeit style mansion built for hunting, near Rostock, Germany

A mansion is a large dwelling house. The word itself derives through Old French from the Latin word mansio "dwelling", an abstract noun derived from the verb manere "to dwell". The English word manse originally defined a property large enough for the parish priest to maintain himself, but a mansion is usually no longer self-sustaining in this way (compare a Roman or medieval villa). Manor comes from the same root—territorial holdings granted to a lord who would "remain" there. Following the fall of Rome, the practice of building unfortified villas ceased. Today, the oldest inhabited mansions around the world usually began their existence as fortified houses in the Middle Ages. As social conditions slowly changed and stabilized, fortifications were able to be reduced and over the centuries gave way to comfort. It became fashionable and possible for homes to be beautiful rather than grim and forbidding allowing for the development of the modern mansion.

In British English, a mansion block refers to a block of flats or apartments designed for the appearance of grandeur. In many parts of Asia, including Hong Kong and Japan, the word mansion also refers to a block of apartments. In modern Japan, a "manshon" (Japanese: マンション), stemming from the English word "mansion", is used to refer to a multi-unit apartment complex or condominium.

== History ==
=== 15th to 18th-century development ===
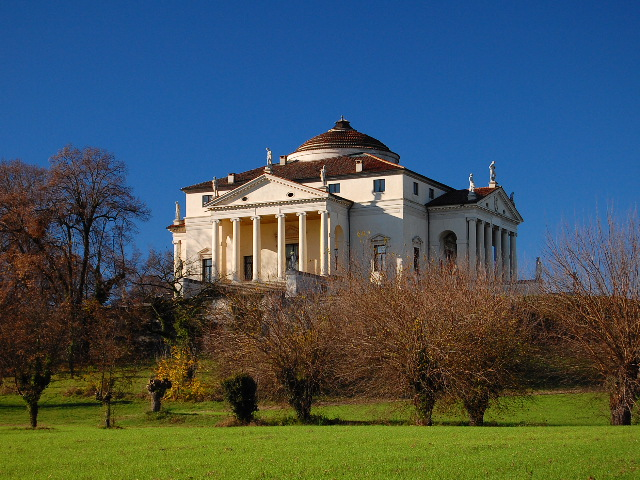
Renaissance villas such as Villa Rotonda near Vicenza, Italy were an inspiration for many later mansions, especially during the industrialization.

In Europe, from the 15th century onwards, a combination of politics and advances in weaponry negated the need for the aristocracy to live in fortified castles. As a result, many were transformed into mansions without defences or demolished and rebuilt in a more modern, undefended style. Due to intermarriage and primogeniture inheritance amongst the aristocracy, it became common for one noble to often own several country houses. These would be visited rotationally throughout the year as their owner pursued the social and sporting circuit from country home to country home.

Many owners of a country house would also own a town mansion in their country's capital city. These town mansions were referred to as 'houses' in London, 'hôtels particuliers' in Paris, and 'palaces' in most European cities elsewhere. It might be noted that sometimes the house of a clergyman was called a "mansion house" (e.g., by the Revd. James Blair, Commissary in Virginia for the Bishop of London, 1689–1745, a term related to the word "manse" commonly used in the Church of Scotland and in Non-Conformist churches. H.G. Herklots, The Church of England and the American Episcopal Church).

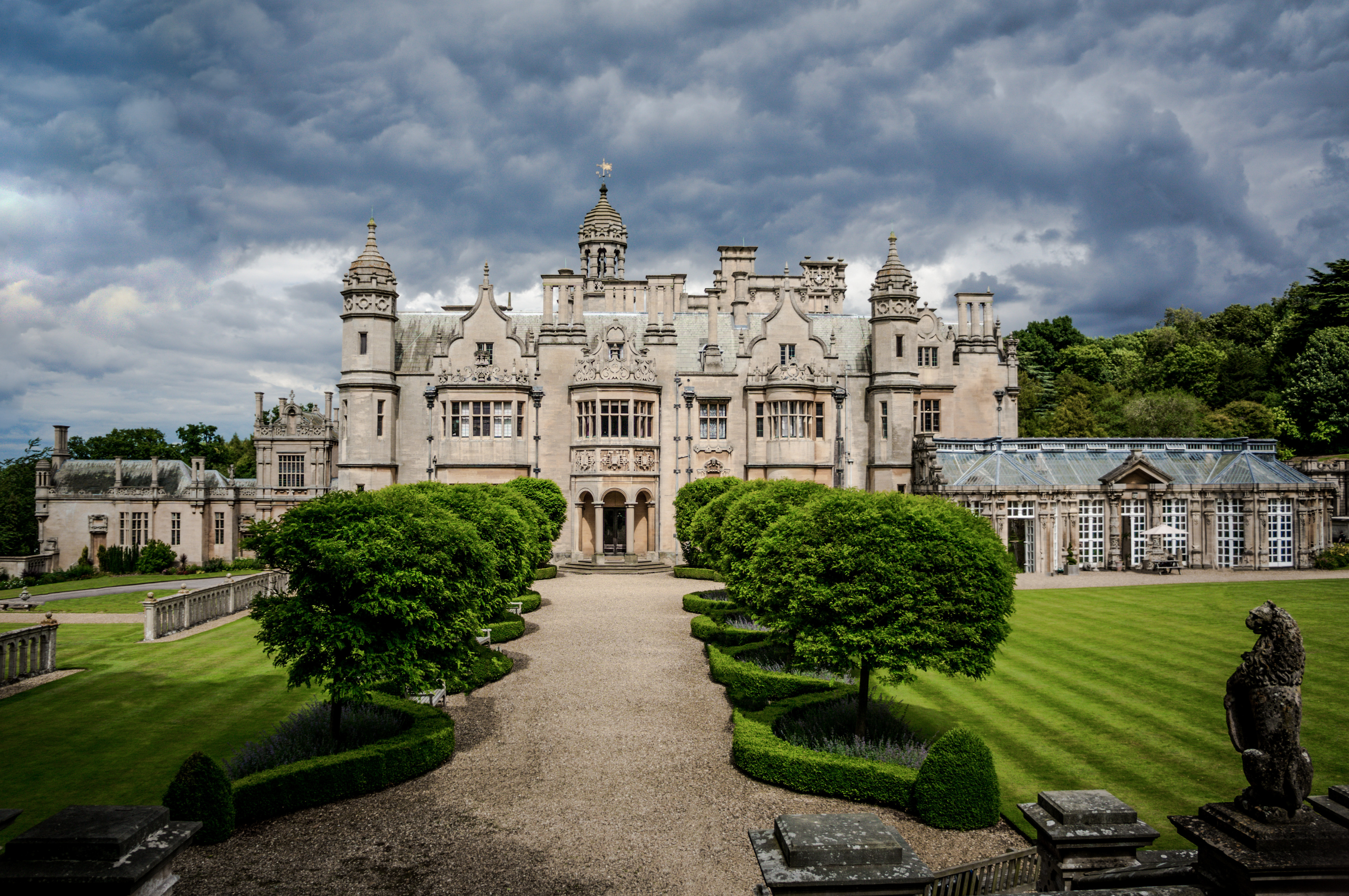
Harlaxton Manor, England, a 19th-century meeting of Renaissance, Tudor and Gothic architecture produced Jacobethan – a popular form of historicist mansion architecture.

As the 16th century progressed and the Renaissance style slowly spread across Europe, the last vestiges of castle architecture and life changed; the central points of these great houses became redundant as owners wished to live separately from their servants, and no longer ate with them in a Great hall. All evidence and odours of cooking and staff were banished from the principal parts of the house into distant wings, while the owners began to live in airy rooms, above the ground floor, with privacy from their servants, who were now confined, unless required, to their specifically delegated areas—often the ground and uppermost attic floors. This was a period of great social change, as the educated prided themselves on enlightenment.

The uses of these edifices paralleled that of the Roman villas. It was vital for powerful people and families to keep in social contact with each other as they were the primary moulders of society. The rounds of visits and entertainments were an essential part of the societal process, as described in the novels of Jane Austen. State business was often discussed and determined in informal settings. Times of revolution reversed this value. During July/August 1789, a significant number of French country mansions (chateaux) were destroyed by the rural population as part of the Great Fear—a symbolic rejection of the feudal rights and restraints in effect under the Ancien Régime.

Until World War I it was not unusual for a moderately sized mansion in England such as Cliveden to have an indoor staff of 20 and an outside staff of the same size, and in ducal mansions such as Chatsworth House the numbers could be far higher. In the great houses of Italy, the number of retainers was often even greater than in England; whole families plus extended relations would often inhabit warrens of rooms in basements and attics. Most European mansions were also the hub of vast estates.

=== 19th-century development ===
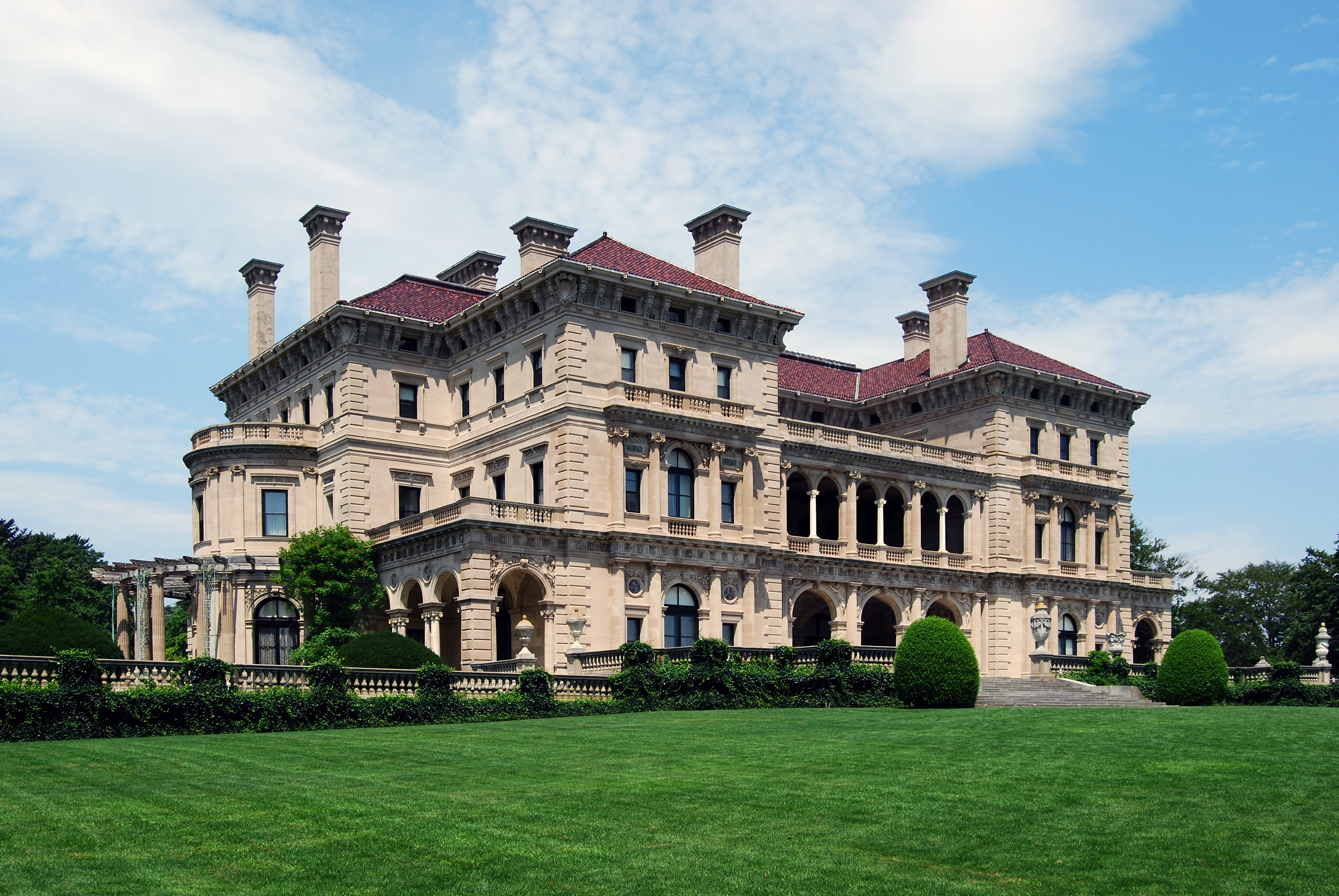
Built in Renaissance Revival style, The Breakers in Newport, Rhode Island, is one of the best known 19th-century mansions in the United States.

The 19th century saw the continuation of the building of mansions in the United States and Europe. These mansions were often smaller than those built by the old European aristocracy. The new builders of mansions at the time explored new styles other than the Gothic tastes in architecture which were used often. They experimented with 19th-century versions of older Renaissance and Tudoresque styles; The Breakers in Rhode Island is an example of American Renaissance revivalism.

During the 19th century, along with other streets in major cities, Fifth Avenue in New York City had many mansions. Many of these were designed by the leading architects of the day, often in European Gothic Revival style, and were built by families who were making their fortunes. However, nearly all of these have now been demolished. Whitemarsh Hall, a countryside estate in the U.S. was demolished in 1980, along with its extensive gardens, to make way for suburban developments. In Paris, London or Rome, many large mansions and palazzi built or remodeled during the era still survive.

Grand Federal style mansions designed by Samuel McIntire inhabit an area that, in 2012, is the largest collection of 17th- and 18th-century structures in the United States of America. This district in Salem, Massachusetts, is called the McIntire Historic District with the center being Chestnut Street. McIntire's training came from his father and from books. He and his brothers, Joseph and Angler, began their careers as housewrights and carpenters while in their teens but, early on, Samuel's work caught the eye of Salem's pre-eminent merchant, Elias Hasket Derby. Over the next quarter century, McIntire built or remodelled a number of homes for Derby and members of his extended family. McIntire also worked occasionally on Derby's vessels, and would fix a wagon or build a birdhouse if his patron desired. Hamilton Hall is a National Historic Landmark at 9 Chestnut Street in Salem, Massachusetts. Hamilton Hall was built in 1805 by Samuel McIntire and added to the National Register of Historic Places in 1970. "King" Derby's stamp of approval opened many other doors for McIntire, who went on to design and build mansions for John Gardner, Jerethmiel Peirce, Simon Forrester, and other wealthy Salem shipowners. He also built on Chestnut Street a function hall (named for Alexander Hamilton) and a church for the town's merchant class. McIntire also designed the former Salem Court House and Registry of Deeds.

After 1793, Samuel McIntire worked exclusively in the architectural style developed by Robert Adam in Great Britain and brought to America by the great Boston architect, Charles Bulfinch. The delicate Adam style, which emphasized decorative elements and ornamentation, was preferred for McIntire, who was efficient in design and proportions and had skill as a woodcarver. Swags, rosettes, garlands, and his signature sheaths of wheat were carved in wood surfaces in McIntire homes built between 1793 and his death in 1811.

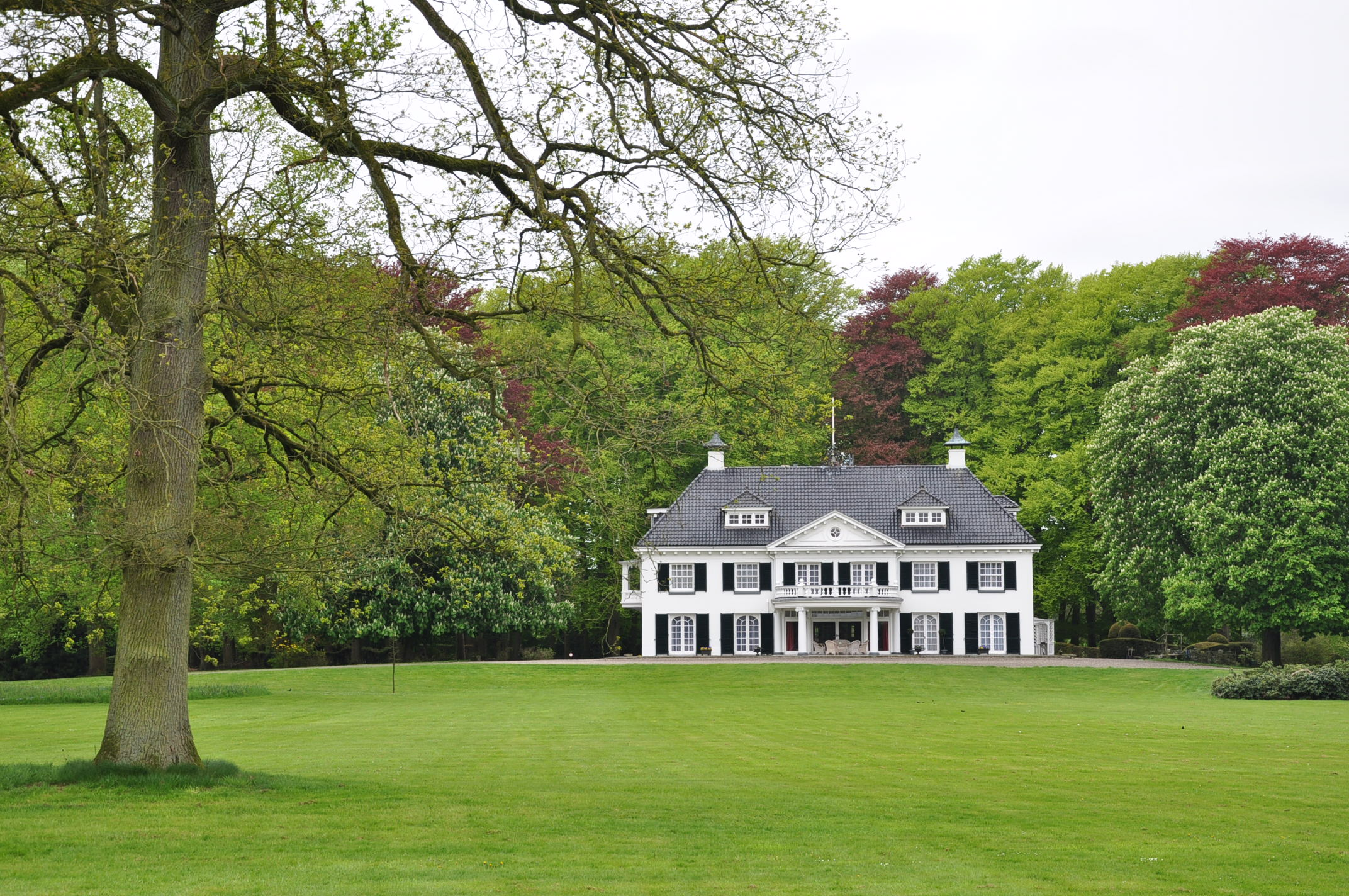
The Palladian inspired Zonnebeek (1907), Enschede, Netherlands

In Europe, some 19th-century mansions were often built as replicas of older houses; the Château de Ferrières in France was inspired by Mentmore Towers, which in turn is a copy of Wollaton Hall. Other mansions were built in the new and innovative styles of the new era such as the arts and crafts style: The Breakers is a pastiche of an Italian Renaissance palazzo; Waddesdon Manor in Buckinghamshire is a mixture of various French châteaux. One of the most enduring and most frequently copied styles for a mansion is the Palladian – particularly so in the 18th century. However, the Gothic style was probably the most popular choice of design in the 19th century. The most bizarre example of this was probably Fonthill Abbey which actually set out to imitate the mansions which had truly evolved from medieval Gothic abbeys following the Dissolution of the Monasteries in the 16th century.

Mansions built during and after the 19th century were not supported by the large estates of their predecessors. These new mansions were often built as the week-end retreats of businessmen who commuted to their offices by the new railways, which enabled them to leave the city more easily.

== Latin America ==
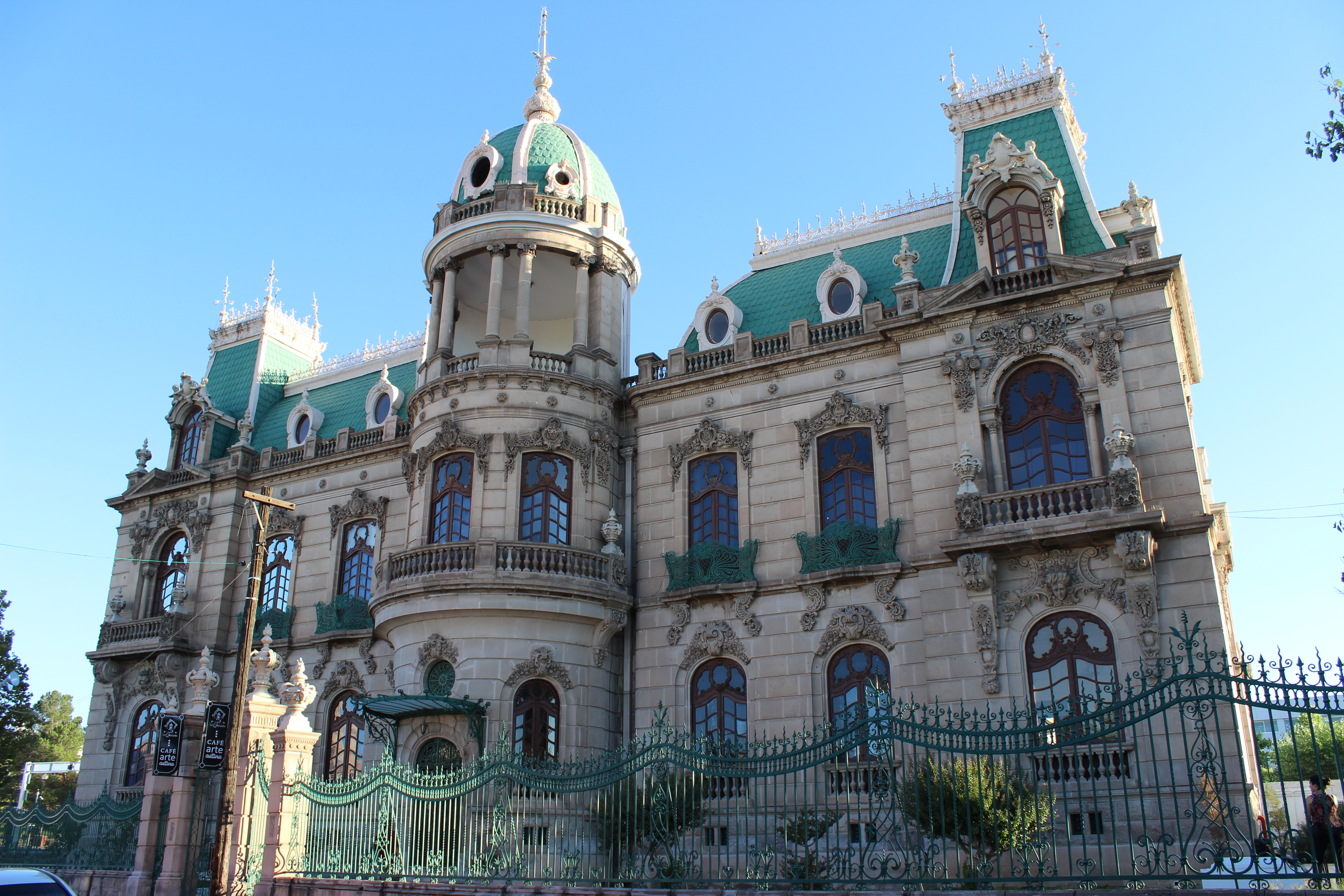
The Quinta Gameros is a Porfirian-era mansion located in Chihuahua, Mexico. The building, designed in a French style, is testimony to an era when France asserted greater soft power in the region than either Spain or Portugal.

In Latin America, the grand rural estate, the Hacienda, Estancia, in Portuguese speaking Brazil Fazenda or Estância, with the mansion as its stately center, is a characteristic feature.

Mansions tended to follow European architectural styles. Whereas until the second half of the 19th century, Portugal and Spain as the colonial (or former colonial) powers were the eminent models for architecture and upper-class lifestyle, towards the end of the 19th century they were sometimes replaced by then more dominant powers like France or England.

In comparably developed, densely populated countries like Mexico, feudal estates and their mansions were as grand and stately as in the Mediterranean old world, whereas where estates were founded in the sparsely populated remote areas like the Pampa of Argentina or Uruguay, where iron pillars, doors, windows, and furniture had to be brought from Europe by ship and afterwards ox cart, buildings were smaller, but normally still aspiring to evoke a stately impression, often featuring, like their earlier Italian counterparts, a morador.

In Venezuela, the traditional Spanish mansions with a garden in the center of the property are usually referred as "Quinta".

== Size ==
Some realtors in the US term mansions as houses that have a minimum of 8,000-square-foot (740 m^{2}) of floor space. Others say a viable minimum could instead be 5,000-square-foot (460 m^{2}) of floor space, especially in a city environment.

== See also ==
- McMansion – Large mass-produced dwelling
- Townhouse – Individual urban house in a terrace or row
- Palace
- Castle
- Pazo – Traditional Spanish manor house
- Ansitz – Type of stately home in the Germanic region
- List of Gilded Age mansions
- List of largest houses in the Los Angeles metropolitan area
- List of largest houses in the United States
- Mansion tax – Type of annual property tax
- Mansionization – Urban studies and planning term
