= Thomas Symonds House =

Historic house in Massachusetts, United States

- U.S. National Register of Historic Places
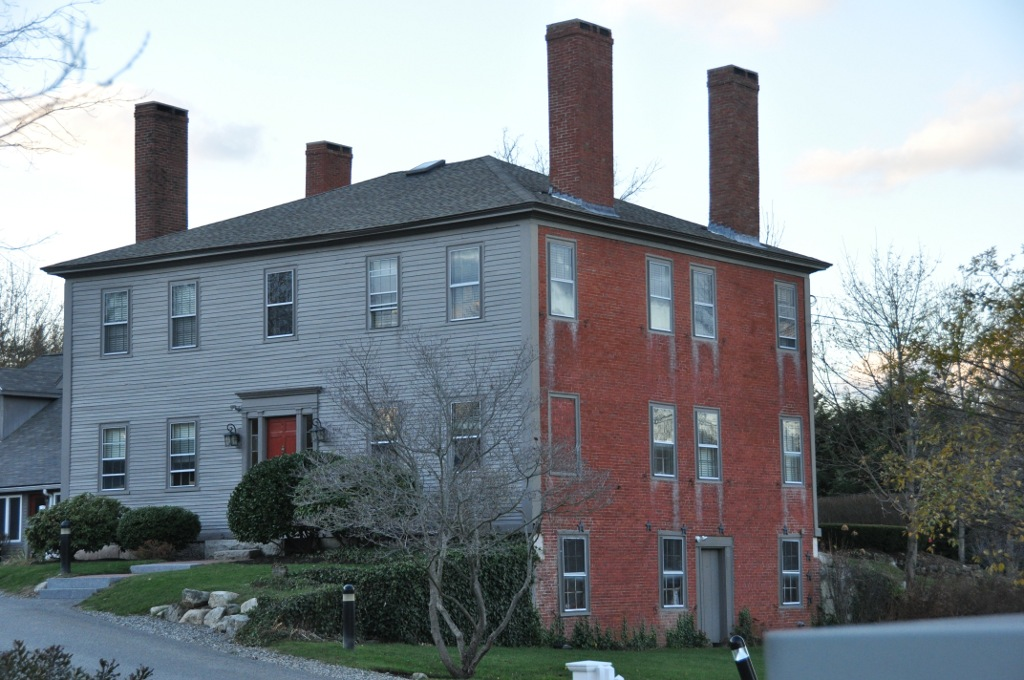

- Location within Massachusetts Location within the United States
- Location: Reading, Massachusetts
- Coordinates: 42°32′25″N 71°5′22″W
- Built: 1785
- Architect: Bancroft, Daniel
- Architectural style: Federal
- MPS: Reading MRA
- NRHP reference No.: 84002833
- Added to NRHP: July 19, 1984

The Thomas Symonds House is a historic house at 320 Haverhill Street in Reading, Massachusetts. Built sometime between 1775 and 1836 by Thomas Symonds, Jr., it is the only Federal period brick-ended house in the town, and is unusually architecturally sophisticated for the period in the town. The house was listed on the National Register of Historic Places in 1984.

== Description and history ==
The Symonds House is set opposite Symonds Way on the west side of Haverhill Street, one of Reading's oldest north–south roads, and an early settlement area. Facing south, it is a large 2 1/2-story wood-frame structure, with a hip roof and four interior chimneys. Its end walls are brick, and the front and rear walls are finished in clapboards. Its front door surround is a conjectured 20th century replacement for an earlier surround. The entry on the north side has narrow pilasters, and is topped by a four-pane transom and an entablature with an elaborate cornice.

The house was built sometime between 1783 and 1836 by Thomas Symonds, Jr., whose father had made by 1750 accumulated significant land in the area. The relatively high Federal style of the house is unusual for Reading, and may have been the result of the influence of Salem builder Samuel McIntire, who was related to Symonds (also a Salem native) by marriage. The use of brick was probably a fashion statement, since Symonds owned a local sawmill, and lumber was readily available. The property now houses a hospice facility.

== See also ==
- National Register of Historic Places listings in Reading, Massachusetts
- National Register of Historic Places listings in Middlesex County, Massachusetts
