= Peirce–Nichols House =

Historic house in Massachusetts, United States

- U.S. National Register of Historic Places
- U.S. National Historic Landmark
- U.S. Historic district – Contributing property
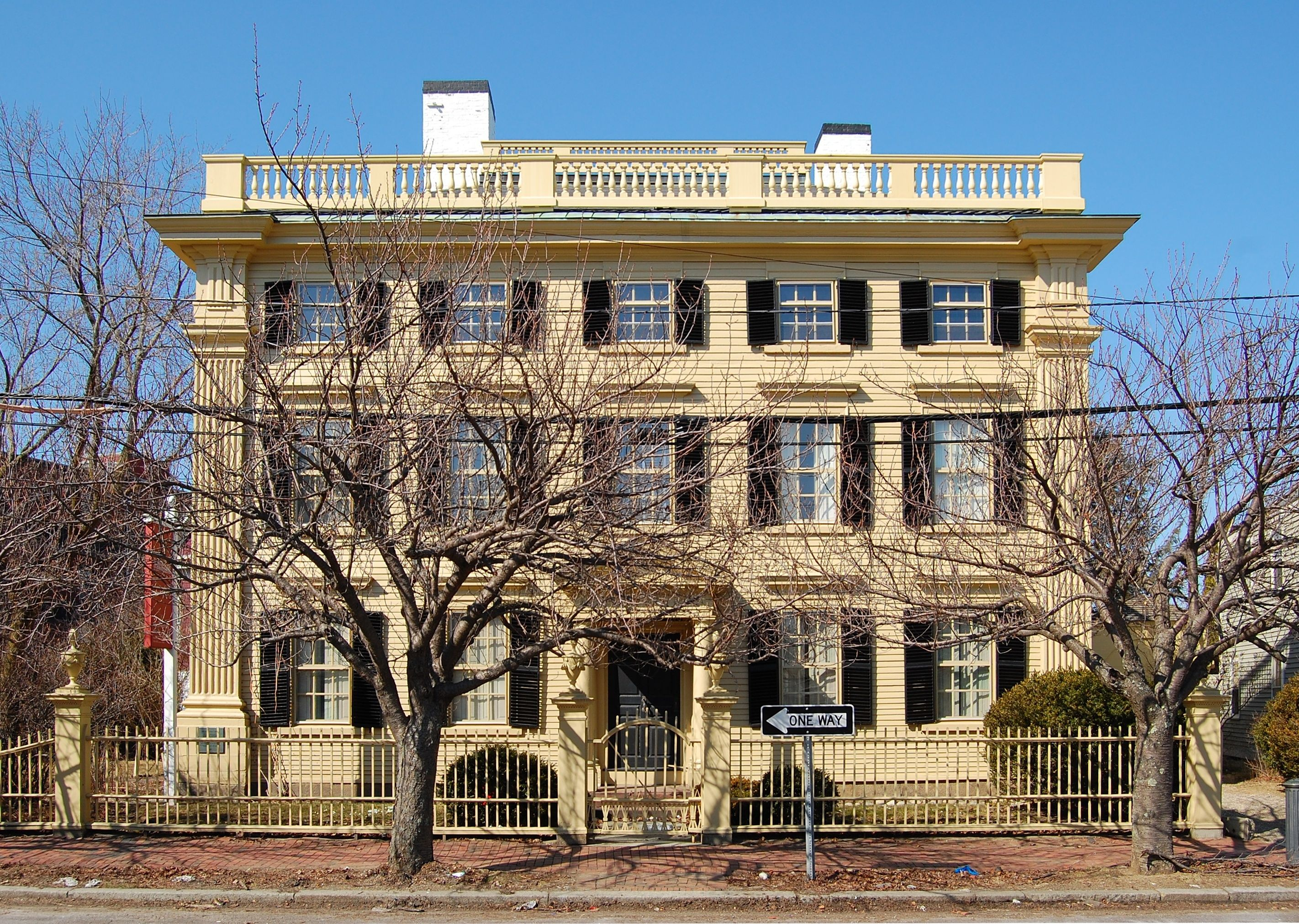

- Location within Massachusetts Location within the United States
- Location: Salem, Massachusetts
- Coordinates: 42°31′22″N 70°54′0″W
- Built: 1782
- Architect: McIntire, Samuel
- Architectural style: Georgian, Federalist
- Part of: Chestnut Street District (ID73000312)
- NRHP reference No.: 68000041

Significant dates
- Added to NRHP: November 24, 1968
- Designated NHL: November 24, 1968
- Designated CP: August 28, 1973

The Peirce–Nichols House is a historic house museum located at 80 Federal Street in Salem, Massachusetts. Designed early in the career of noted Salem builder Samuel McIntire (1757–1811), and modified later by him, the building gives a unique view into the methods and styles of McIntire. It was designated a National Historic Landmark in 1973 for its significance as an early masterwork of one of the country's first recognized master builders. It is now owned by the Peabody Essex Museum.

== History ==
Jerathmiel Peirce (1747–1827), began his career as a leather dresser. In about 1778, he formed a partnership with Aaron Waite, and purchased a two-gun schooner, the Greyhound, to serve as a privateer against British merchant vessels in the Revolutionary War. The partnership prospered, and over the next half a century, purchased/built at least 10 vessels, sending them to ports around the world. In 2000, the National Park Service had a full-scale replica of one of the Waite & Peirce ships built, the Friendship of Salem, which is the centerpiece of Salem Maritime National Historic Site. Waite and Peirce were also major investors in the newly incorporated Beverly Bank, and were members of Salem's merchant aristocracy. Salem was a major center of trade in the early 1800s, and as a result of this, was the home of America's first millionaire, and on a per-capita basis, was the richest city in America. Peirce went from humble beginnings to owning one of the finest homes in Salem.

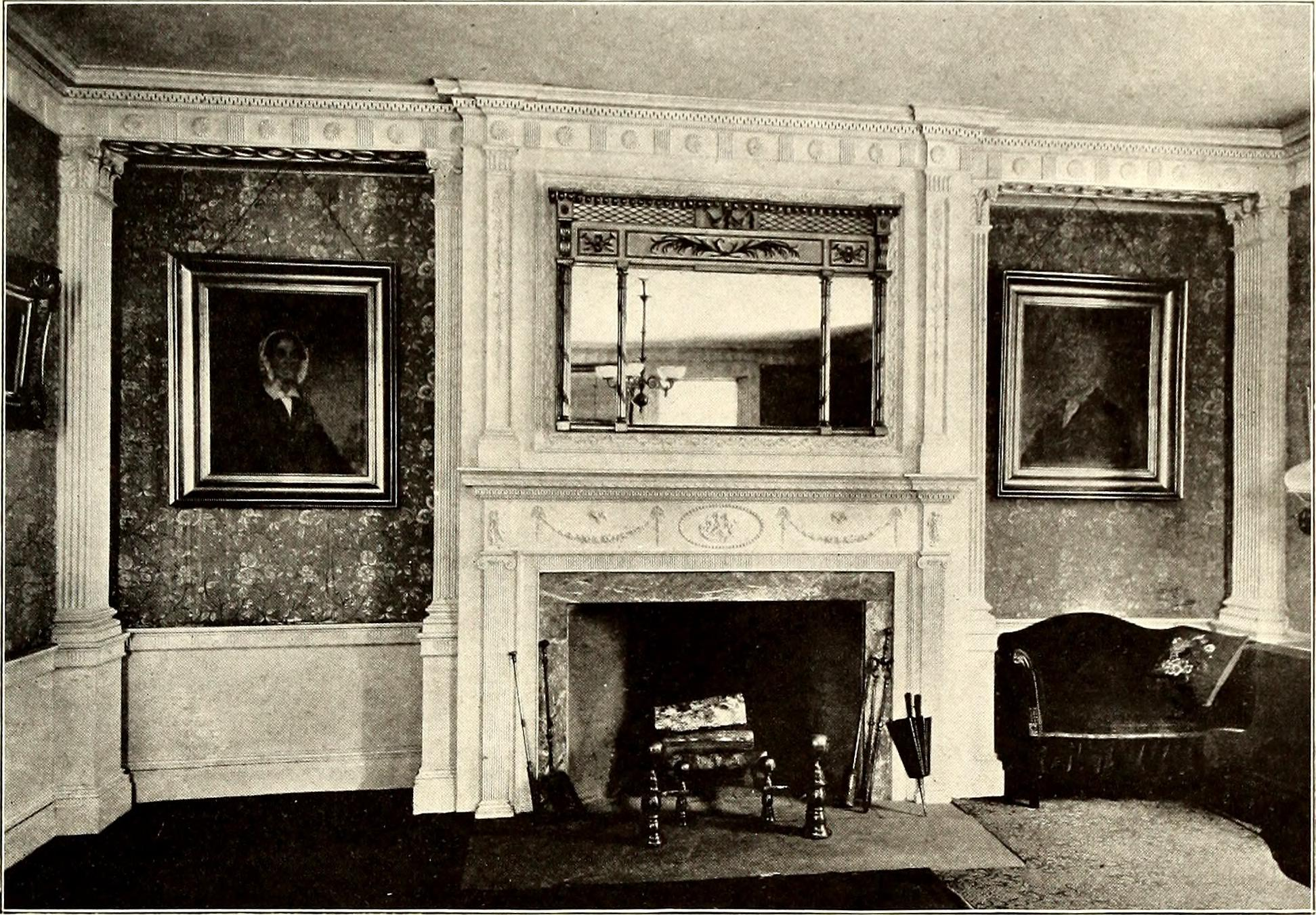
Interior of the Peirce–Nichols House. McIntire did many of the fine woodworking details himself.

In 1779, Peirce purchased a large lot in Salem, and in about 1782, he engaged Samuel McIntire to design and build his home there. The property he owned went all the way to the banks of the North River, where his ships tied up and he had a counting house. The house is known to have been completed by 1784, when city tax records show Peirce being assessed for a completed house. Peirce later suffered financial misfortune and was forced to sell the house. It was purchased by friends, who willed it to the children of George and Sally (Peirce) Nichols. The house remained in the Nichols family until 1917, when it was sold to the Essex Institute, predecessor to the Peabody Essex Museum. It was opened to the public in the late 1930s after the last of the Nichols owners died.

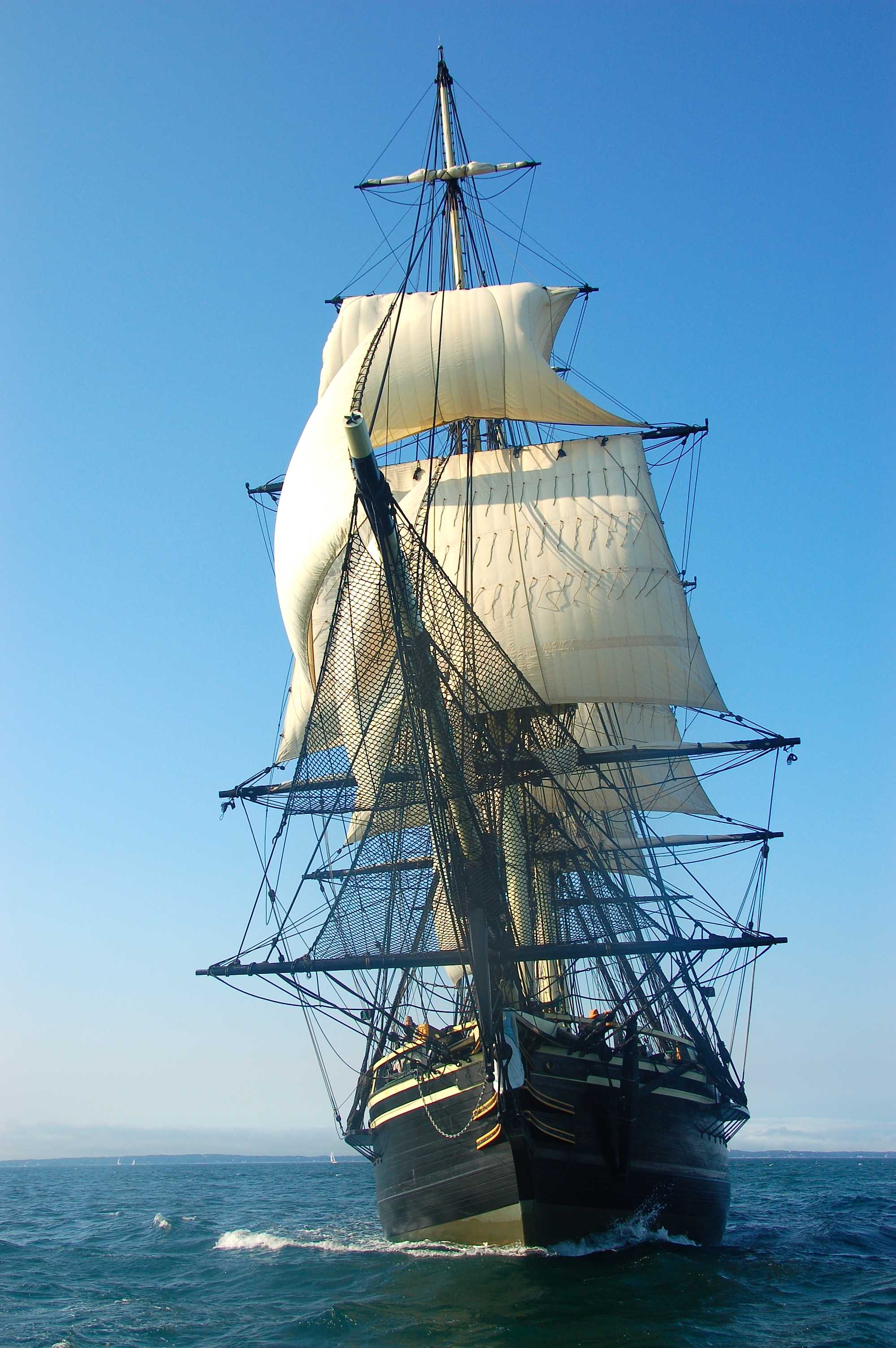
The Friendship of Salem

McIntire patterned the design of the house fairly closely on patterns found in the Builder's Treasury of Batty Langley, published in 1740. As a result, the house has late Georgian styling. This was altered in some portions in 1801, when Peirce again hired McIntire to redo the hallway east parlor in preparation for the wedding of his daughter Sally to George Nichols. This area features the lighter Federal styling that was being popularized by architect Charles Bulfinch.

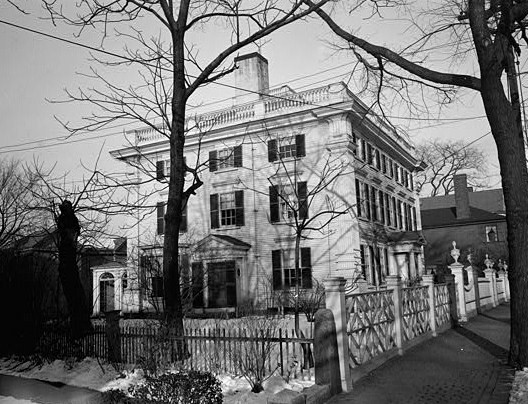
View from the side (HABS photo, 1940)

The house property was declared a National Historic Landmark in 1968, cited as a particularly elegant example of late Georgian craftsmanship, and for its association with McIntire. It is also a contributing element of Salem's Chestnut Street District.

== Description ==
The Peirce–Nichols House is a three-story wood-frame building sheathed in clapboards. It has a low pitch hipped roof that is encircled by a low balustrade at the cornice, which further has a central flat section that functions as a roof deck and is also surrounded by a balustrade. The corners of the building are decorated by fluted Doric pilasters rising the height of the building. The front entry is in the center bay (of five), and is sheltered by a pedimented porch supported by Doric columns set on a brownstone step. Large twin chimneys rise through the interior of the house. The windows on the first two floors feature 6 over 6 sashes, while the third floor has typical foreshortened 3 over 6 sashes.

Behind the house is a carriage house which is thought to date from the same time as the house. Its symmetrical front facade is divided into three sections, the center one featuring a projecting triangular pediment. The flanking sections are also pedimented, and are punctuated by round arched openings topped by keystones.

== See also ==
- List of historic houses in Massachusetts
- List of National Historic Landmarks in Massachusetts
- National Register of Historic Places listings in Salem, Massachusetts
- National Register of Historic Places listings in Essex County, Massachusetts
