= Pickering House (Salem, Massachusetts) =

Historic house in Massachusetts, United States

Coordinates: 42°31′06.23″N 70°54′00.07″W

- U.S. Historic district – Contributing property
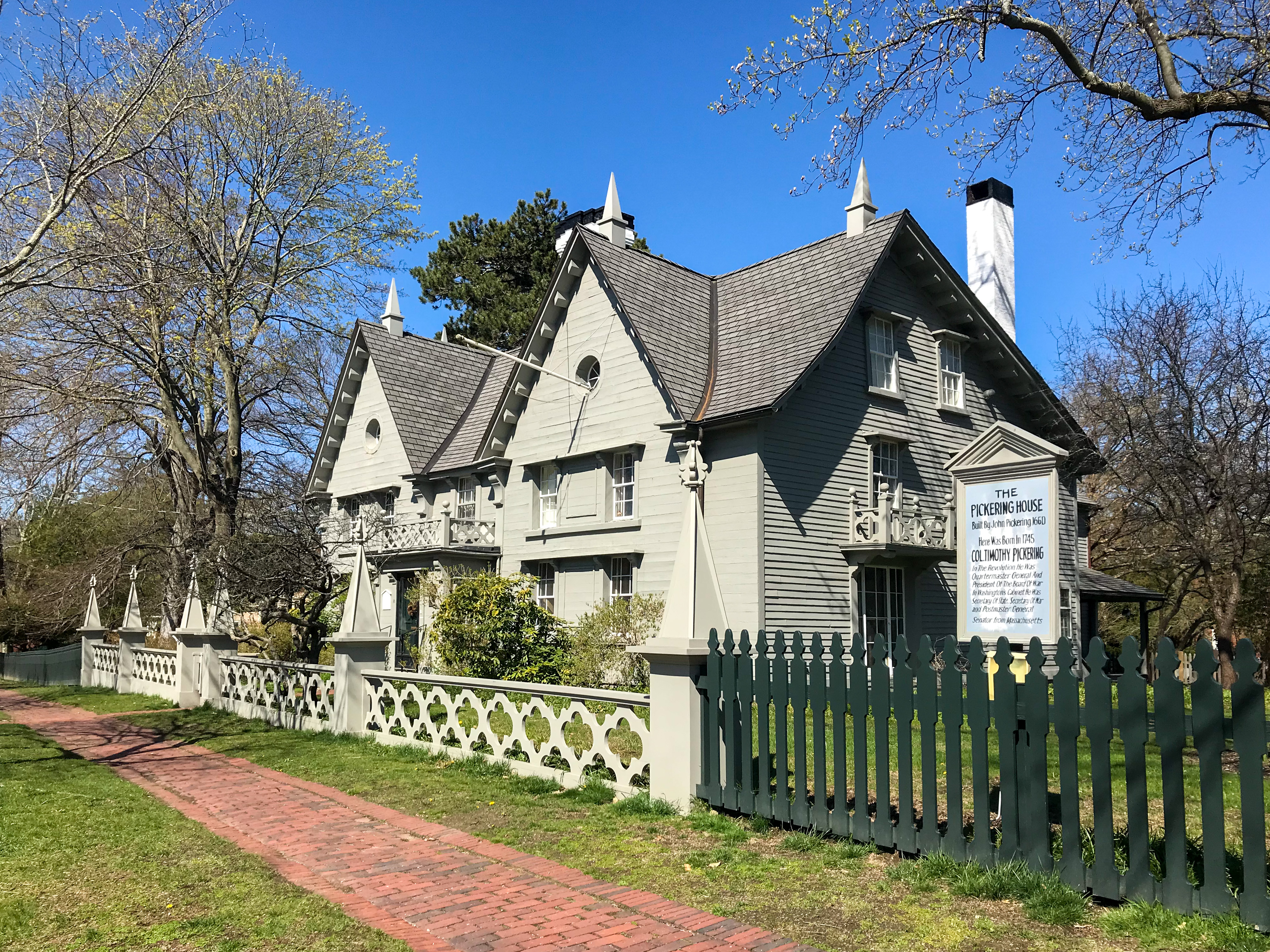
- Built: c. 1664
- Part of: Chestnut Street District

The Pickering House (circa 1664) is a First Period Colonial house at 18 Broad Street, in Salem, Massachusetts' McIntire Historic District. Located in downtown Salem between Cambridge & Summer Street. Ten successive generations of the Pickering family including Colonel Timothy Pickering have owned and lived in this grand home. This house is believed to have been the oldest house in the United States continuously occupied by one family. However, in 1998, the Goodhue family moved into the house, with Albert Goodhue as the primary caretaker. It is located at 18 Broad Street, Salem, Massachusetts and is open to the public under the auspices of the nonprofit Pickering Foundation. Across the street is the Broad Street Cemetery, one of the three oldest in Salem.

== History ==
Although the core house is in the First Period style, it has evolved considerably over the years. The original house was two stories tall, with a single room on each floor, and an entry bay. The left side was then added circa 1682 by his son, John Pickering II. In 1751, Deacon Timothy Pickering raised a rear lean-to up to a full two stories, which is how the house exists today.

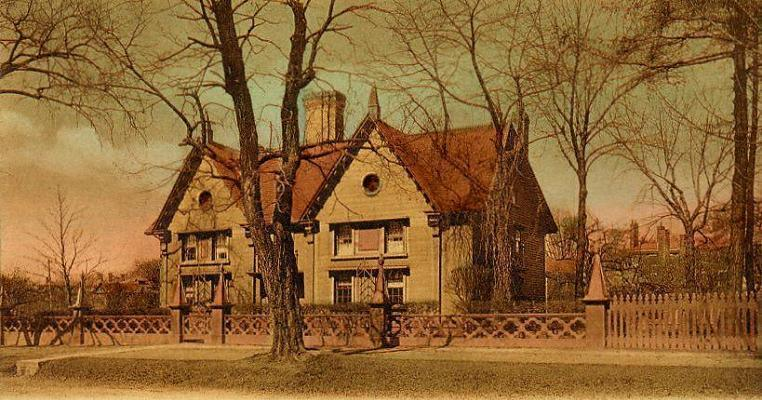
Pickering House in c. 1905

In 1841 the front facade was reworked in the Gothic Revival style, with the facade gables probably dating from this time. Many of the house's external features date from this alteration, including the roof finials, round windows in the gables, cornice brackets, and exterior entry porch. Family records also suggest that a passageway was cut through the chimney stack at this time, and that the exterior chimney was remodeled to today's columnar style at this time. The Gothic-style fence with its cut-outs and obelisk finials was also added in this renovation. In 1904 a two-story ell was added to the rear. In 1948, Boston architect Gordon Robb carried out interior restoration work to reintroduce more Colonial Revival features.

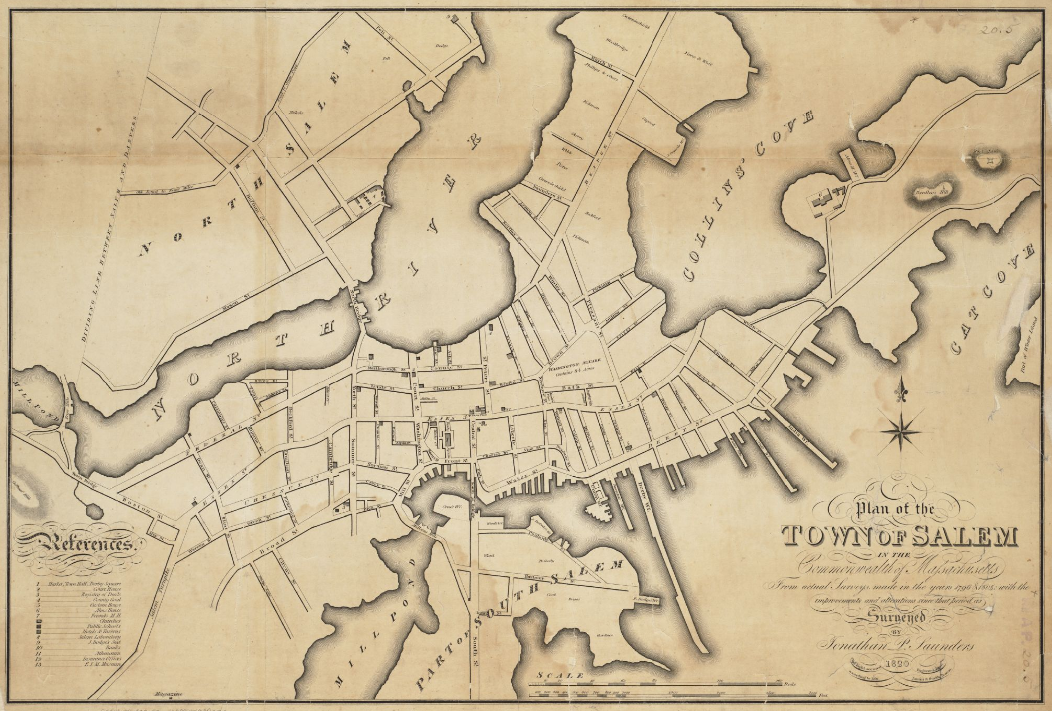
Salem, 1820

== See also ==
- List of historic houses in Massachusetts
- Timothy Pickering
- List of the oldest buildings in Massachusetts
- List of the oldest buildings in the United States
