= Federal architecture =

Architectural style in the US (1780–1830)

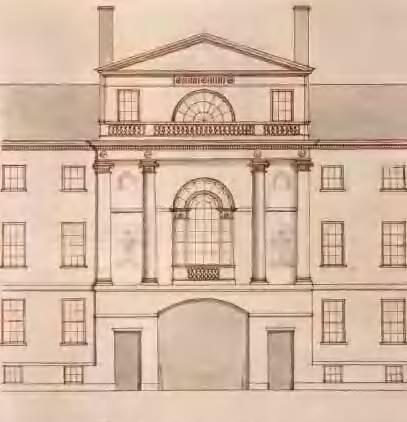
Central Pavilion at Tontine Crescent in Boston, built in 1793–94

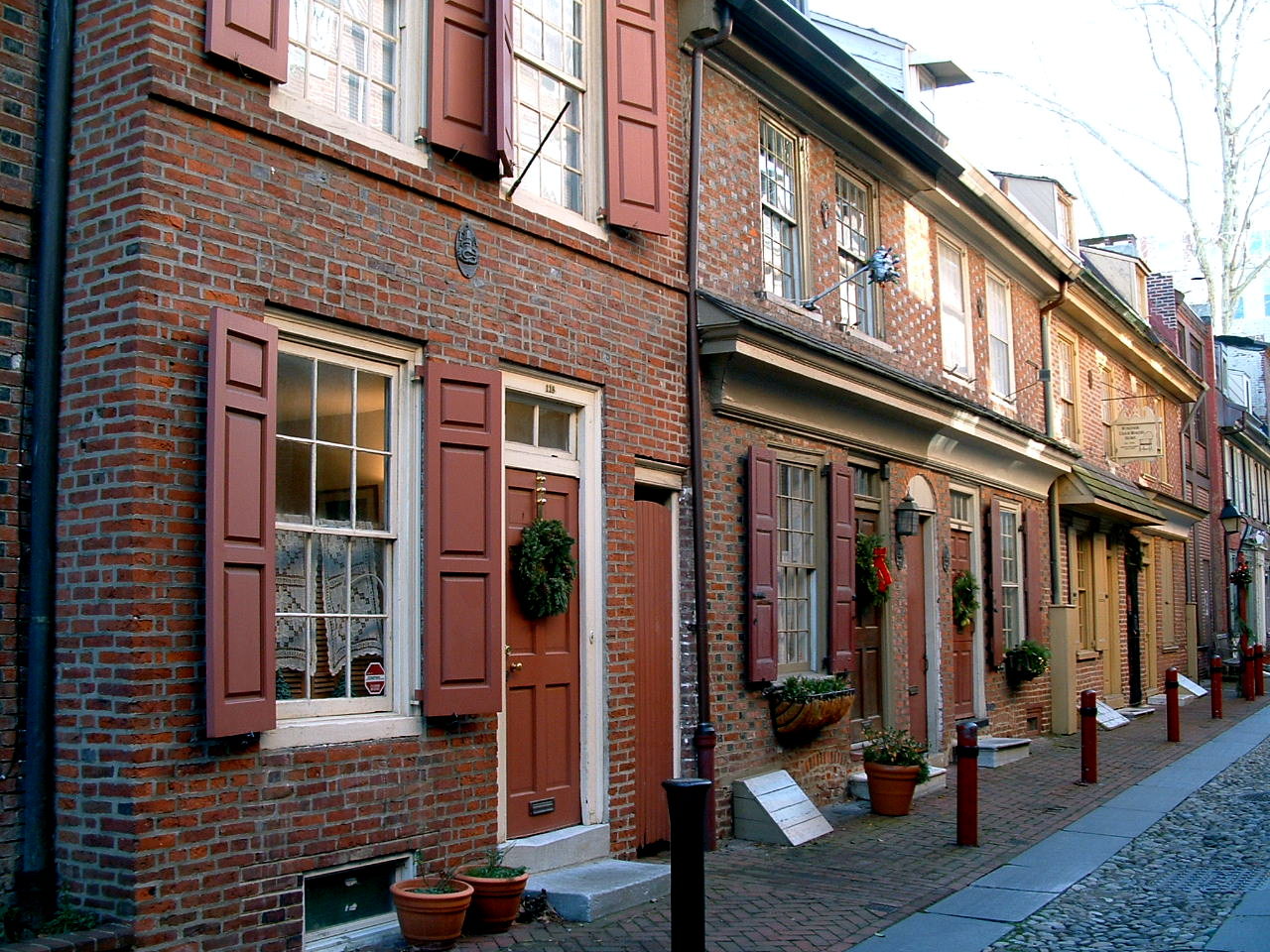
Elfreth's Alley in Philadelphia, featuring Colonial and Federal-style homes, is believed to be the nation's oldest residential street.

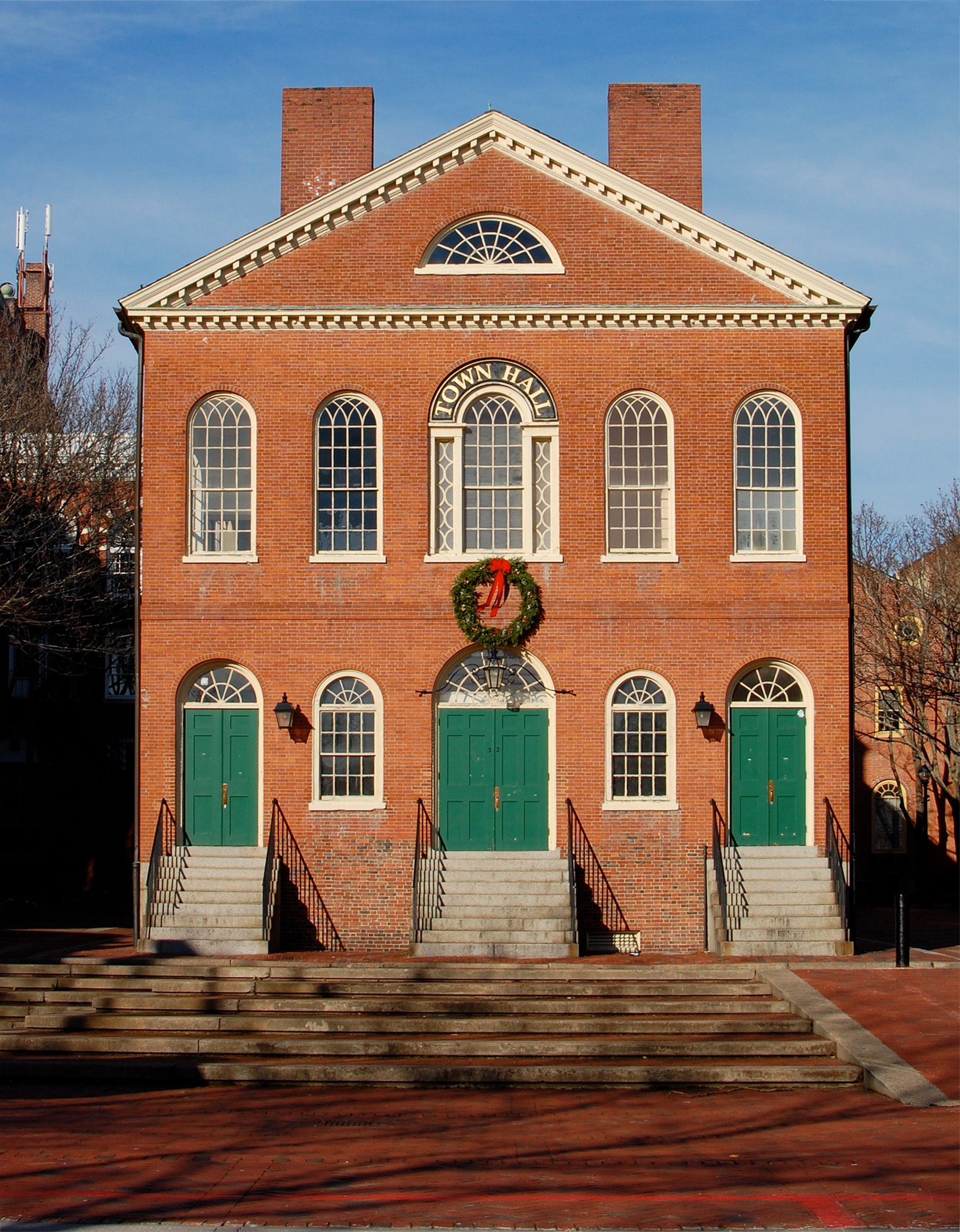
Old Town Hall in Salem, Massachusetts, built in 1816–17

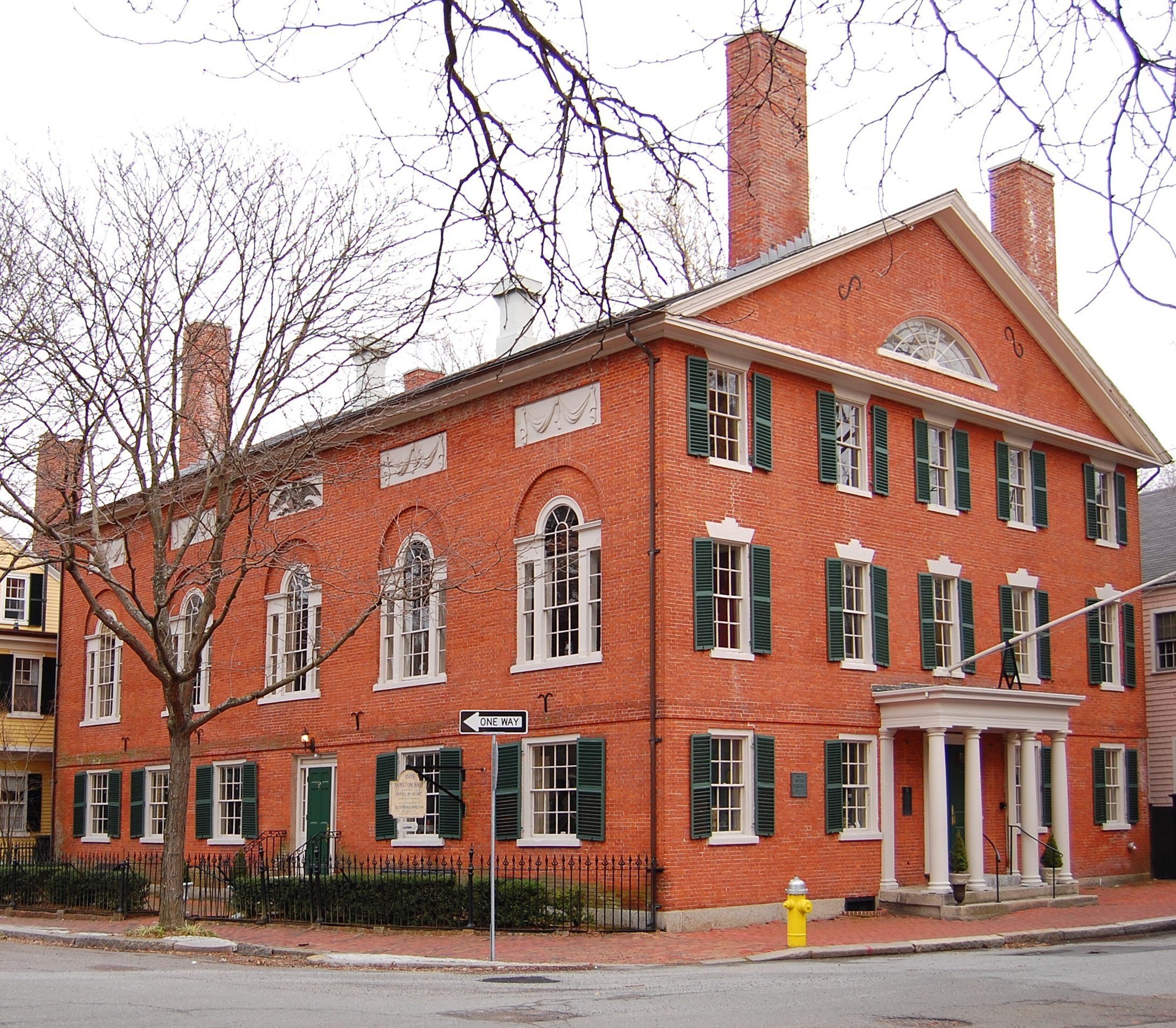
Hamilton Hall, built in 1805 by Samuel McIntire in Salem, Massachusetts

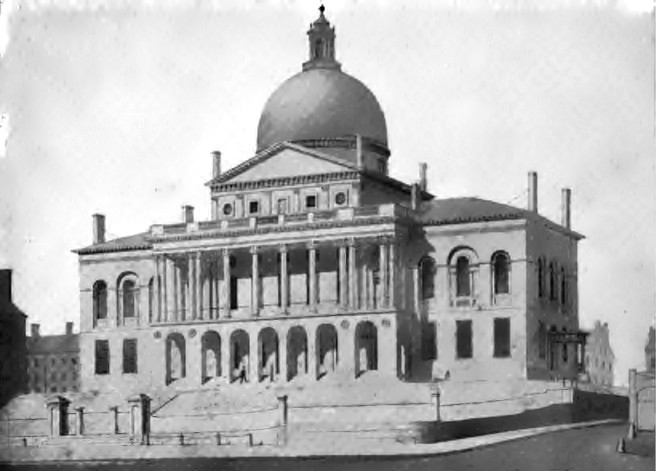
An 1827 illustration by Alexander Jackson Davis of Massachusetts State House in Boston, built in 1798

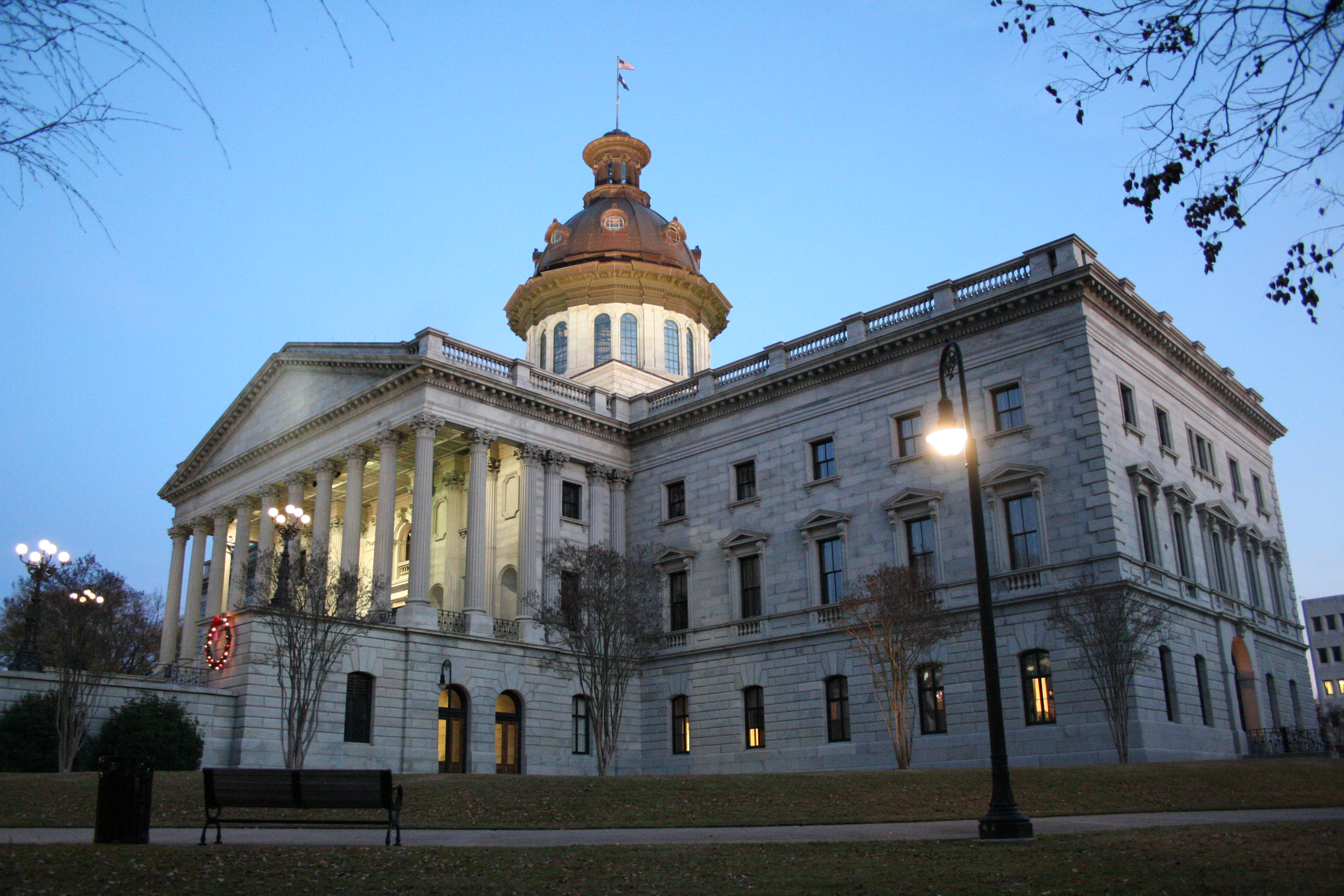
South Carolina State House in Columbia, South Carolina, an example of American Federal style of architecture

Federal-style architecture is the classical architecture built in the United States following the American Revolution between c. 1780 and 1830, and particularly from 1785 to 1815, which was influenced heavily by the works of Andrea Palladio with several innovations on Palladian architecture by Thomas Jefferson and his contemporaries. Jefferson's Monticello estate and several federal government buildings, including the White House, are among the most prominent examples of buildings constructed in Federal style.

Federal style is also used in association with furniture design in the United States of the same time period. The style broadly corresponds to the classicism of Biedermeier style in the German-speaking lands, Regency architecture in Britain, and the French Empire style. It may also be termed Adamesque architecture. The White House and Monticello were setting stones for what Federal architecture has become.

In the early United States, the founding generation consciously chose to associate the nation with the ancient democracies of Greece and the republican values of Rome. Grecian aspirations informed the Greek Revival, lasting into the 1850s. Using Roman architectural vocabulary, the Federal style applied to the balanced and symmetrical version of Georgian architecture that had been practiced in the American colonies' new motifs of neoclassical architecture as it was epitomized in Britain by Robert Adam, who published his designs in 1792.

== Characteristics ==
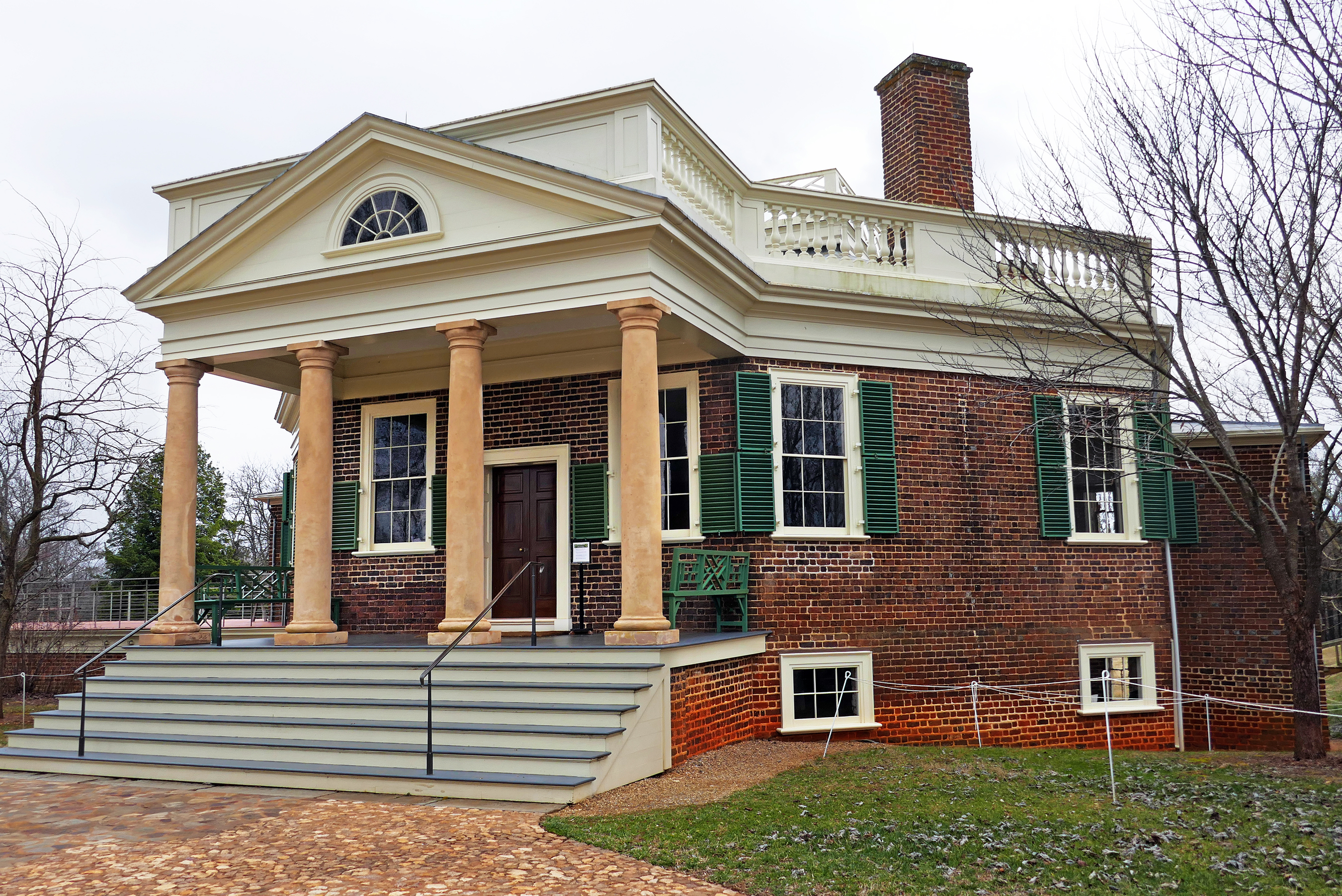
Poplar Forest, Thomas Jefferson's country retreat home in Bedford County, Virginia.

American Federal architecture typically uses plain surfaces with attenuated detail, usually isolated in panels, tablets, and friezes. It also had a flatter, smoother façade and rarely used pilasters. It was most influenced by the interpretation of ancient Roman architecture, fashionable after the unearthing of Pompeii and Herculaneum. The bald eagle was a common symbol used in this style, with the ellipse a frequent architectural motif.

The classicizing manner of constructions and town planning undertaken by the federal government was expressed in early federal projects of lighthouses, harbor buildings, universities, and hospitals. It can be seen in the rationalizing, urbanistic layout of L'Enfant Plan of Washington and in the Commissioners' Plan of 1811 in New York. The historic eastern part of Bleecker Street in New York, between Broadway and the Bowery, is home to Federal-style row houses at 7 to 13 and 21 to 25 Bleecker Street. The classicizing style of Federal architecture can especially be seen in the quintessential New England meeting house, with their lofty and complex towers by architects such as Lavius Fillmore and Asher Benjamin.

This American neoclassical high style was the idiom of America's first professional architects, such as Charles Bulfinch and Minard Lafever. Robert Adam and James Adam were leading influences through their books.

== Legacy of Federal architecture in Salem, Massachusetts ==
In Salem, Massachusetts, there are numerous examples of American colonial architecture and Federal architecture in two historic districts: Chestnut Street District, which is part of the Samuel McIntire Historic District containing 407 buildings, and the Salem Maritime National Historic Site, consisting of 12 historic structures and about 9 acres (4 ha) of land along the waterfront.

== Architects of the Federal period ==
- Asher Benjamin
- Charles Bulfinch
- John Holden Greene
- James Hoban
- Thomas Jefferson
- Minard Lafever
- Benjamin Latrobe
- Pierre L'Enfant
- John McComb Jr.
- Samuel McIntire
- Robert Mills
- Alexander Parris
- William Strickland
- Martin E. Thompson
- William Thornton
- Ithiel Town
- Ammi B. Young

Modern reassessment of the American architecture of the Federal period began with Fiske Kimball.

== See also ==
- Adam style
- Boscobel (Garrison, New York)
- Hamilton Grange National Memorial
- Hinchman House
- List of houses in Fairmount Park
- Lyre arm
- Manasseh Cutler Hall
- Morris–Jumel Mansion
