= Hamilton Hall (Salem, Massachusetts) =

- U.S. National Register of Historic Places
- U.S. National Historic Landmark
- U.S. Historic district – Contributing property
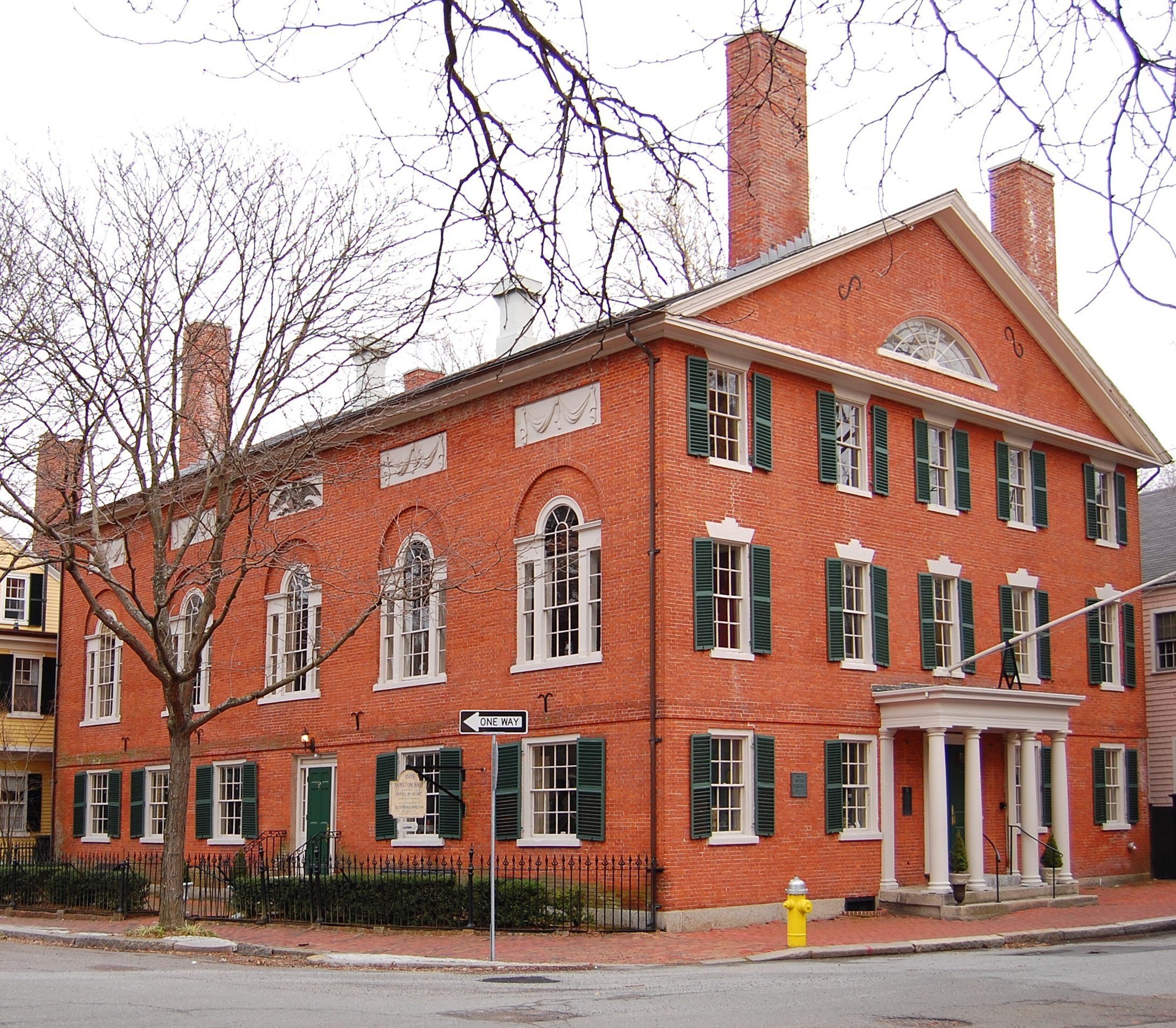
- Hamilton Hall

- Location within Massachusetts Location within the United States
- Location: 9 Chestnut St., Salem, Massachusetts
- Coordinates: 42°31′10″N 70°53′58″W
- Built: 1805
- Architect: Samuel McIntire
- Architectural style: Federal
- Website: www.hamiltonhall.org
- Part of: Chestnut Street District (ID73000312)
- NRHP reference No.: 70000543

Significant dates
- Added to NRHP: December 30, 1970
- Designated CP: August 28, 1973

Hamilton Hall is a National Historic Landmark at 9 Chestnut Street in Salem, Massachusetts. Designed by noted Salem architect and builder Samuel McIntire and built in 1805–1807, it is a beautiful example of Federal style architecture. It was built as a social space for the leading families of Salem, and was named for Founding Father and Federalist Party leader Alexander Hamilton. It continues to function as a social hall today, used for balls, weddings, private functions, and meetings.

The Hall is also home to the Lecture Series on World Affairs, a series of eight lectures by recognized experts in their fields every Thursday in February and March. The series began to foster opportunities for community conversations and lifelong learning, and as a fundraiser for the preservation of the Hall. It continues to be planned and run by a dedicated group of local women volunteers who form the Lecture Series Committee.

== Architecture ==
Hamilton Hall is a three-story brick structure at the corner of Chestnut and Cambridge Streets, with its gable end front facing Cambridge Street. The brick is laid in a Flemish bond pattern. The entrance facade is five bays wide, with a center entry consisting of double doors sheltered by a Greek Revival porch added c. 1845. This rectangular portico has a flat roof, supported at each corner by two Doric columns. The first floor of the long side (facing Chestnut Street) consists of six bays, of which five are windows and one is a door. The upper level (equal in height to the upper two levels on the front facade) consists of five large Palladian windows set in a slightly recessed arch.

Above each arch is a panel with decorations carved by McIntire. The outer four have a swag design, while the central one features an eagle and shield. The original wooden eagle was removed from the exterior of the building in 2014 to clean and preserve it. It currently hangs above the fireplace in the first-floor Pickering Room, named for Timothy Pickering.

== History ==
Construction of the hall was funded in 1805 by a group of Salem's Federalist merchant families, and cost $22,000. Originally, retail spaces at the entrance on the ground floor housed vendors who sold goods for use in the events held in the upstairs function space. The second level ballroom features an unusual curved balcony and one of the oldest and largest sprung floors in the country.

Beginning around 1807 John Remond became the caretaker of the Hall and with his wife Nancy Lenox Remond built a multi-decade successful catering business. Free black Americans, the Remonds expanded their businesses throughout downtown Salem, as did many of their children. Son Charles Lenox Remond and daughter Sarah Parker Remond became internationally-known speakers and activists for the causes of abolition and women's suffrage.

Hamilton Hall was declared a National Historic Landmark and listed on the National Register of Historic Places in 1970. It is a contributing property to the Chestnut Street District, and part of the local McIntire Historic District, in which a high concentration of McIntire's architectural works are found. In June 2022, the Hall received a historic marker from the National Votes for Women Heritage Trail honoring the activist work of the Remond family, and particularly Sarah Parker Remond.

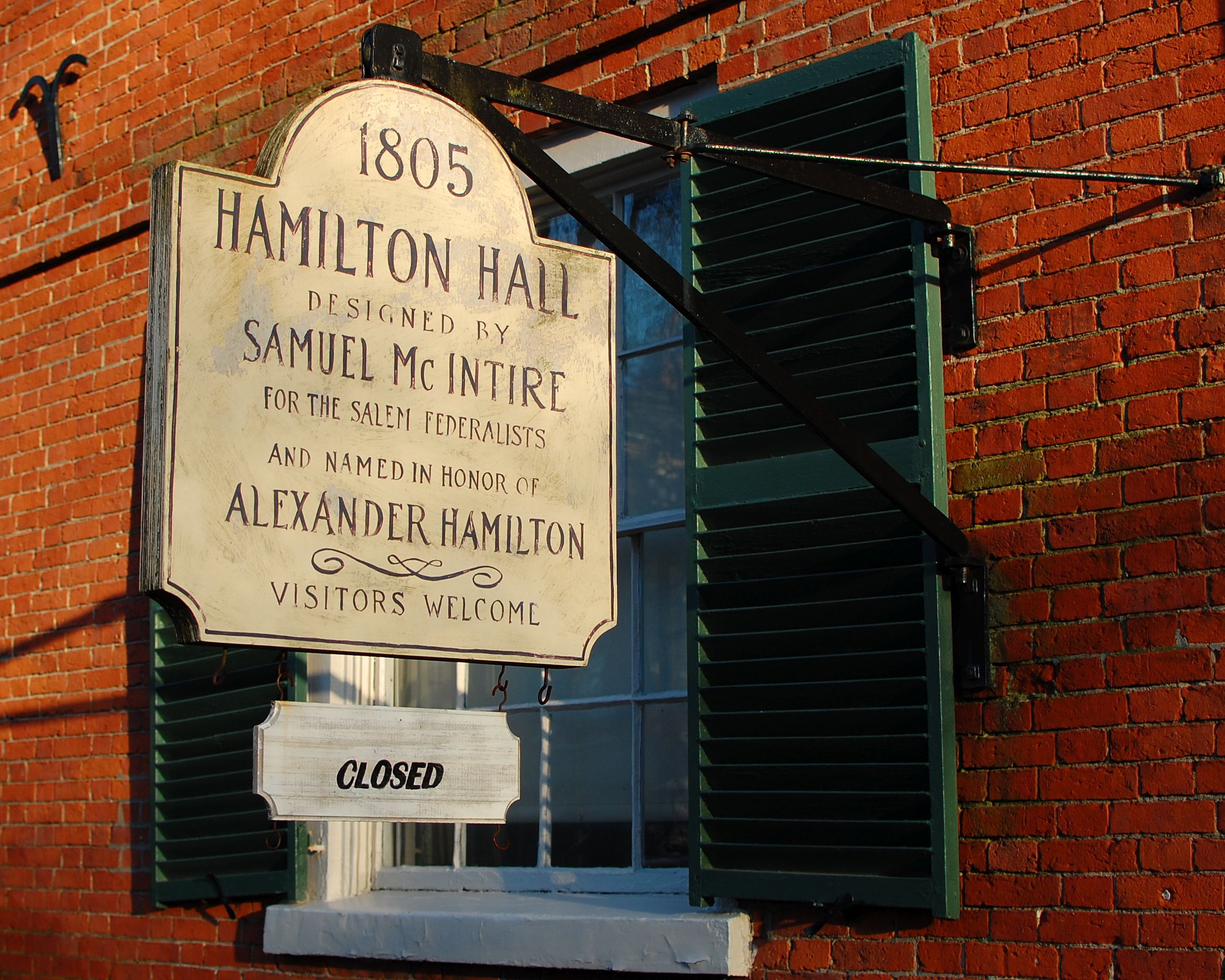
Sign on northern facade noting architect and date

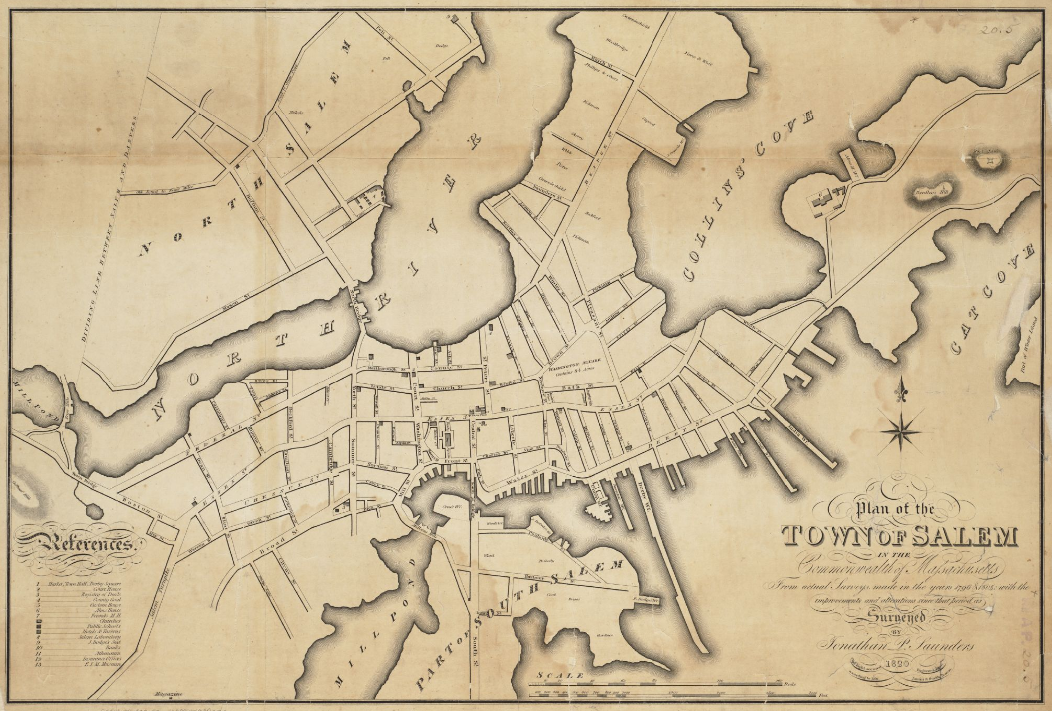
Salem in 1820

== See also ==
- List of National Historic Landmarks in Massachusetts
- National Register of Historic Places listings in Salem, Massachusetts
- National Register of Historic Places listings in Essex County, Massachusetts
