= Samuel McIntire =

American architect and craftsman (1757–1811)

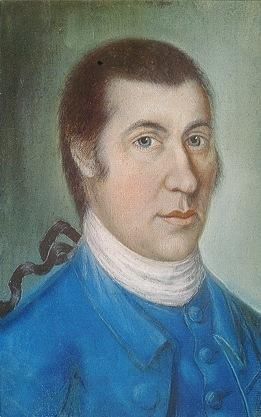
Samuel McIntire, c. 1786, pastel portrait attributed to Benjamin Blyth

Samuel McIntire (January 16, 1757 – February 6, 1811) was an American architect and craftsman, best known for his work in the Chestnut Street District, a classic example of Federal style architecture.

== Life and career ==
Born in Salem, Massachusetts to housewright Joseph McIntire and Sarah (Ruck), he was a woodcarver by trade who grew into the practice of architecture. He married Elizabeth Field on October 10, 1778, and had one son. He built a simple home and workshop on Summer Street in 1786.

Starting about 1780, McIntire was hired by Salem's pre-eminent merchant and America's first millionaire, Elias Hasket Derby, for whose extended family he built or remodeled a series of houses. McIntire taught himself the Palladian style of architecture from books, and soon had a reputation among the city's elite for designing elegant homes. In 1792, he entered a proposal in the competition for the United States Capitol.

After 1797, McIntire worked in the style of Boston architect Charles Bulfinch, who had made fashionable here the neoclassical manner of Scottish architect Robert Adam. Unlike Bulfinch, however, whose designs were featured across the East Coast, McIntire built almost exclusively in New England. His wooden or brick houses were typically 3 stories tall, each with 4 rooms around a central hall. In 1799, he went into business with his brothers, Joseph and Angier McIntire, who erected the structures, while at the workshop he oversaw various ornamentations, including the swags, rosettes, garlands and sheaves of wheat which dominate the interior wooden surfaces. McIntire's Salem works include Peirce-Nichols, Peabody-Silsbee, Gardner-White-Pingree, and the Elias Haskett Derby residences. His public buildings, all in Salem, are Assembly Hall, Hamilton Hall, Washington Hall and the courthouse (the latter two have been demolished). He also designed the 24-room Federal style mansion on the Lyman Estate, completed in 1798.

Since McIntire was a self taught architect who would follow books and other architects within the area of Salem, He used his background of wood carving to create his pieces of work. The Cook-Oliver house was no exception to this, the owner Captain Cook loved what he saw within the Elias Haskett Derby House, he wanted to reuse the wood work and design from it. The Elias Haskett Deby House was very elegant and very detailed throughout the whole building. On the other hand, the Cook-Oliver house was a lot more simpler than Derby house but still had some of the same details since pieces were being reused, the facade was proportional with the building and everything was symmetrical due to the proportions. McIntire would not see this house complete, as well as Captain Cook.

He was a skilled artisan, especially in furniture, and his skill extended to sculpting. Among his works are busts of Voltaire and John Winthrop, the first governor of Massachusetts; both are now owned by the American Antiquarian Society in Worcester, Massachusetts. The woodcarver talent was passed down through the McIntire family. The wood sculptures were very finely detailed which made them resemble marble sculptures. McIntire's work within architecture was closely resembled Rococo of Europe within the ornaments of doorways and rooms within the Federal style1. Even though McIntire would repeat his pieces which caused him to fix any issues within the design to make the piece the way he wanted it to look. Between him and his predecessor Richard Munday, McIntire had more personal talent.

The details within the McIntire's wood work were very detailed, proportional, rhythmic and poetic. He was able to use a lot of different shapes within his designs. One of his best pieces of work was within the Pingree House where he used rectangles throughout the designs for the interior space with a lot of different ornament ascent within. This design was described as elegant since the pieces went together within the interior space. On the facade of the building, the same elegance was used for the entryway. McIntire kept everything proportional to the whole building as well as the details. His style was different from the Adams Style of England due to the simplicity of the work.

"In Memory of Mr. Samuel McIntire who died Feb. 6, 1811, Æt. 54. He was distinguished for Genius in Architecture, Sculpture, and Musick: Modest and sweet Manners rendered him pleasing: Industry, and Integrity respectable: He professed the Religion of Jesus in his entrance on manly life; and proved its excellence by virtuous Principle and unblemished conduct."

== McIntire Chair ==
The McIntire Chair is a vase-back chair, originally part of a large set, was made for Elias Hasket Derby. The chair's overall design is based on plate 2 of George Hepplewhite's Cabinet-Maker and Upholsterer's Guide (London, 1788), but enriched considerably by the addition of relief carving to parts of the back and the front legs. The carved grape clusters in the lunette at the base of the splat and suspended from bowknots at the top of each leg are a motif which is associated with McIntire.

== Samuel McIntire Historic District ==
The Samuel McIntire Historic District was established in 1981, incorporating two previously established districts, Chestnut Street Historic District (1971) and Federal Street Area Historic District (1976) and adding some 249 structures on upper Essex, Broad, and Warren Streets, Dalton Parkway, and various streets in between. The District is named for Salem's celebrated architect-carver, Samuel McIntire, who lived and worked at 31 Summer Street.

McIntire's first major commission, the Peirce-Nichols House (1782), and several of his mature works, including Hamilton Hall (1805), are preserved within the district. Chestnut Street, where there are many Federal Era townhouses designed by McIntire, stands as a monument to the mercantile and maritime ascendancy of Salem in the latter 18th and early 19th centuries.

The District is considered to represent the greatest concentration of 17th and 18th century domestic structures anywhere in America and is one of the greatest concentrations of notable pre-1900 domestic structures extant in the U.S. With few exceptions, the major architectural styles common to the region during the 1640-1940 period are represented. Also included in the District are the Witch House or Jonathan Corwin House (circa 1642), churches, Broad Street Burial Ground (1655), several monuments, and the first Salem State Normal School Building (1854).

== World Record for Federal furniture ==
In 2011, a mahogany side chair with carving attributed to Samuel McIntire sold at auction for $662,500, setting a world record for Federal furniture. The handmade and hand-carved chair made in the late 1790s was one of a set of eight originally purchased by Elizabeth (Crowninshield) and Elias Hasket Derby.

== Gallery ==
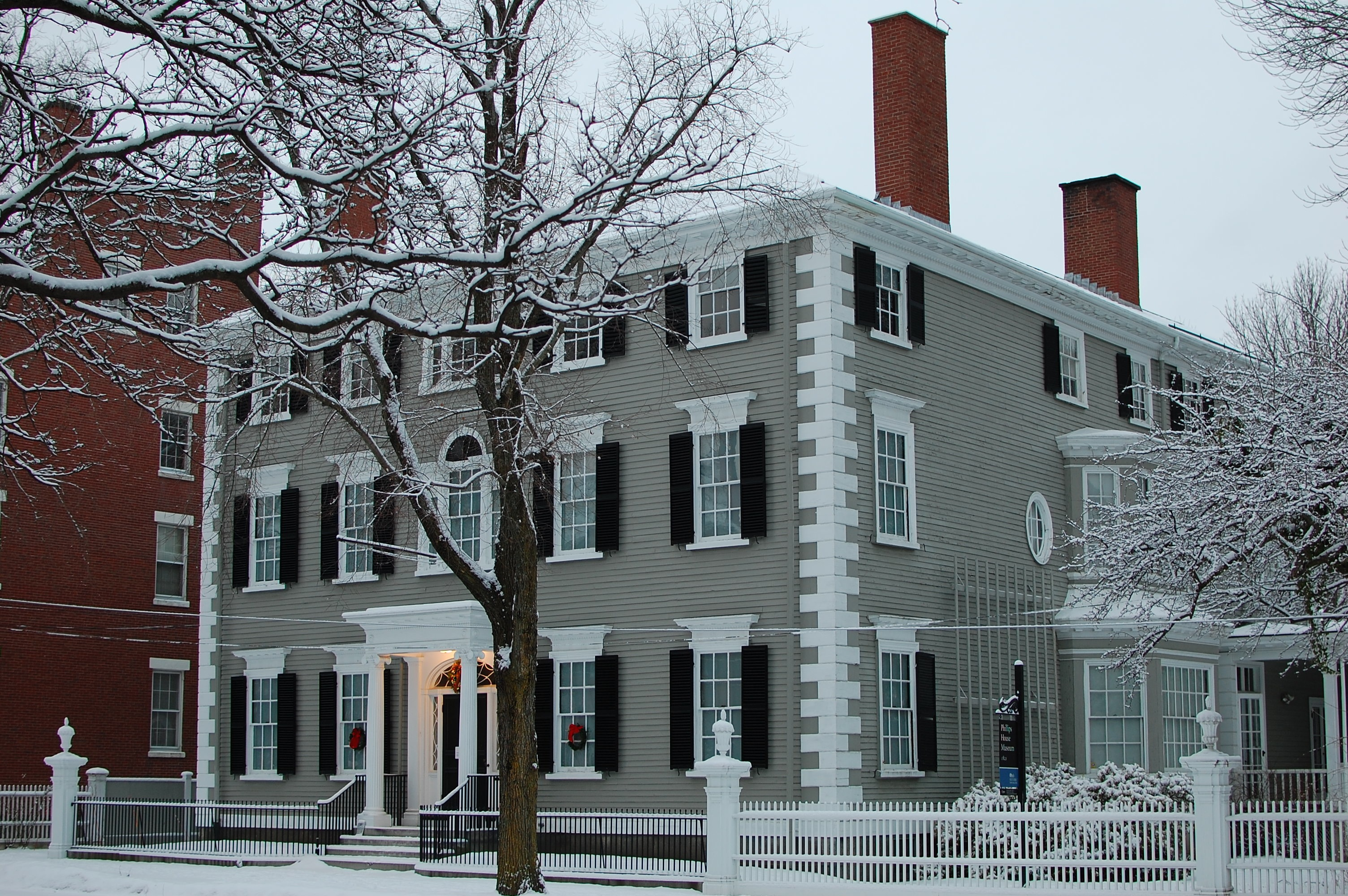
Stephen Phillips House (1800) 34 Chestnut Street Salem, Massachusetts

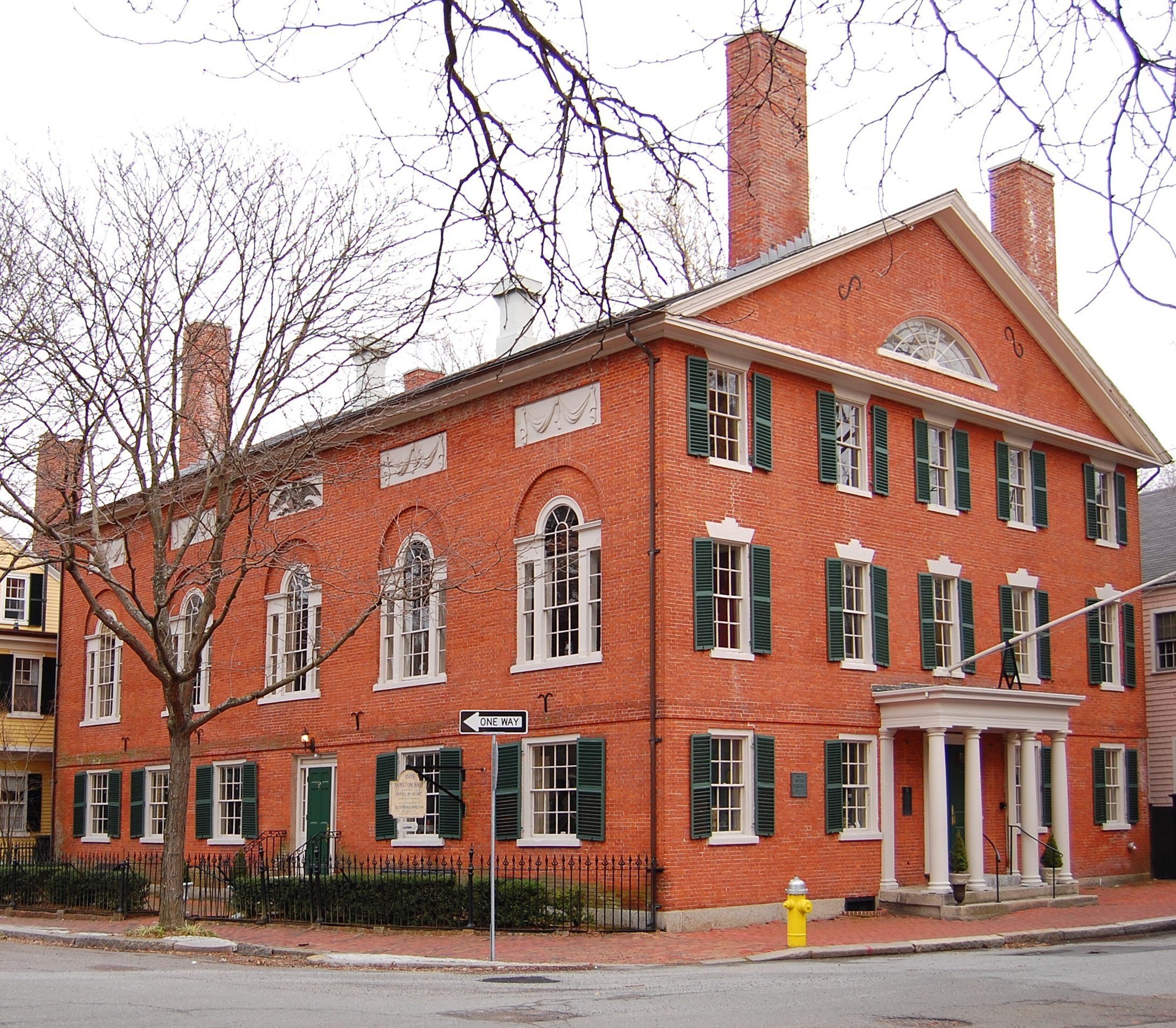
Hamilton Hall (1805) 9 Chestnut Street Salem, Massachusetts

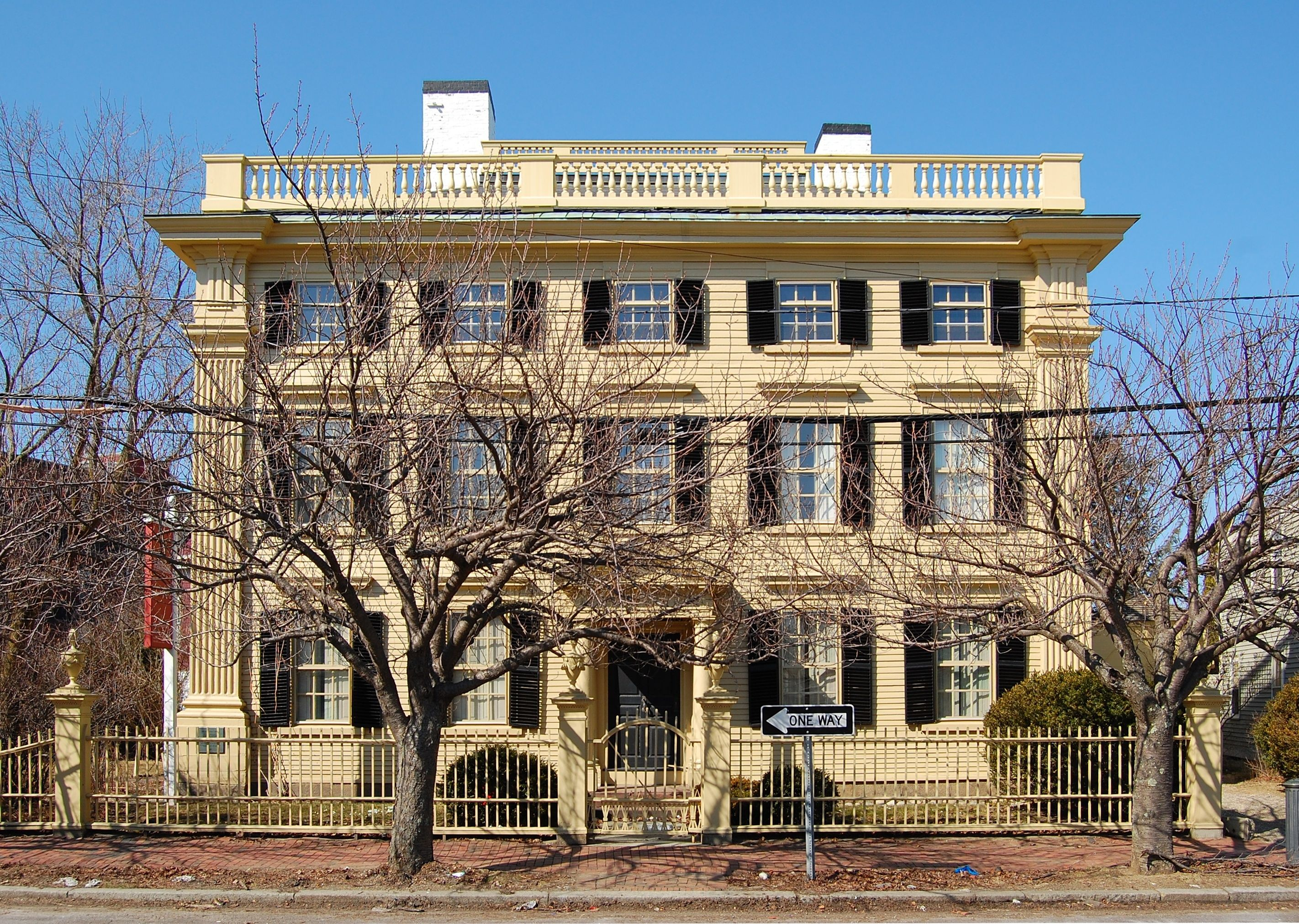
Peirce-Nichols House (1782) 80 Federal Street Salem, Massachusetts; owned by the Peabody Essex Museum, tours available.

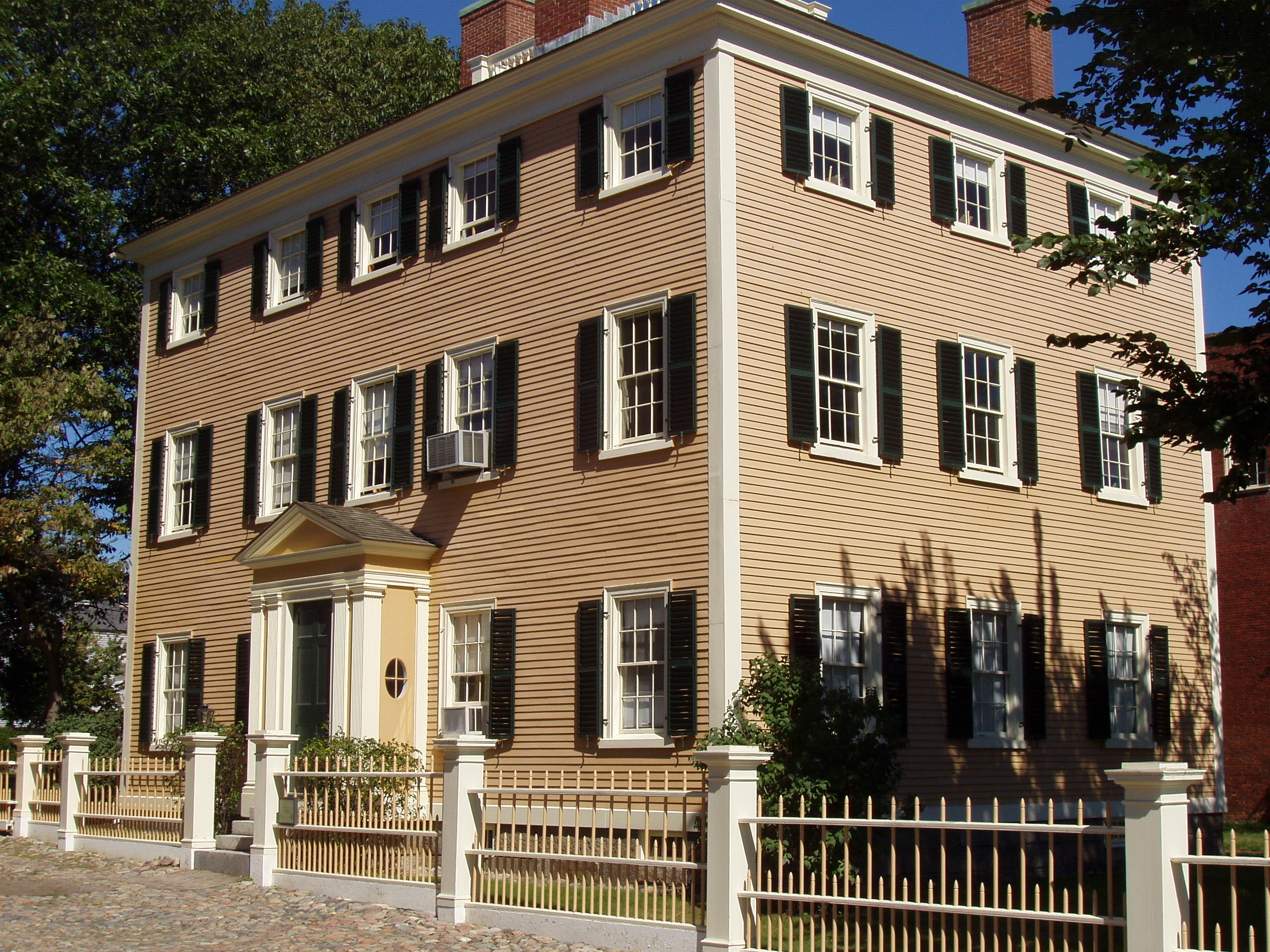
Benjamin Hawkes House (1780, 1800) Derby Wharf Salem, Massachusetts
