= Chestnut Street District =

Historic district in Salem, Massachusetts, US

- U.S. National Register of Historic Places
- U.S. Historic district
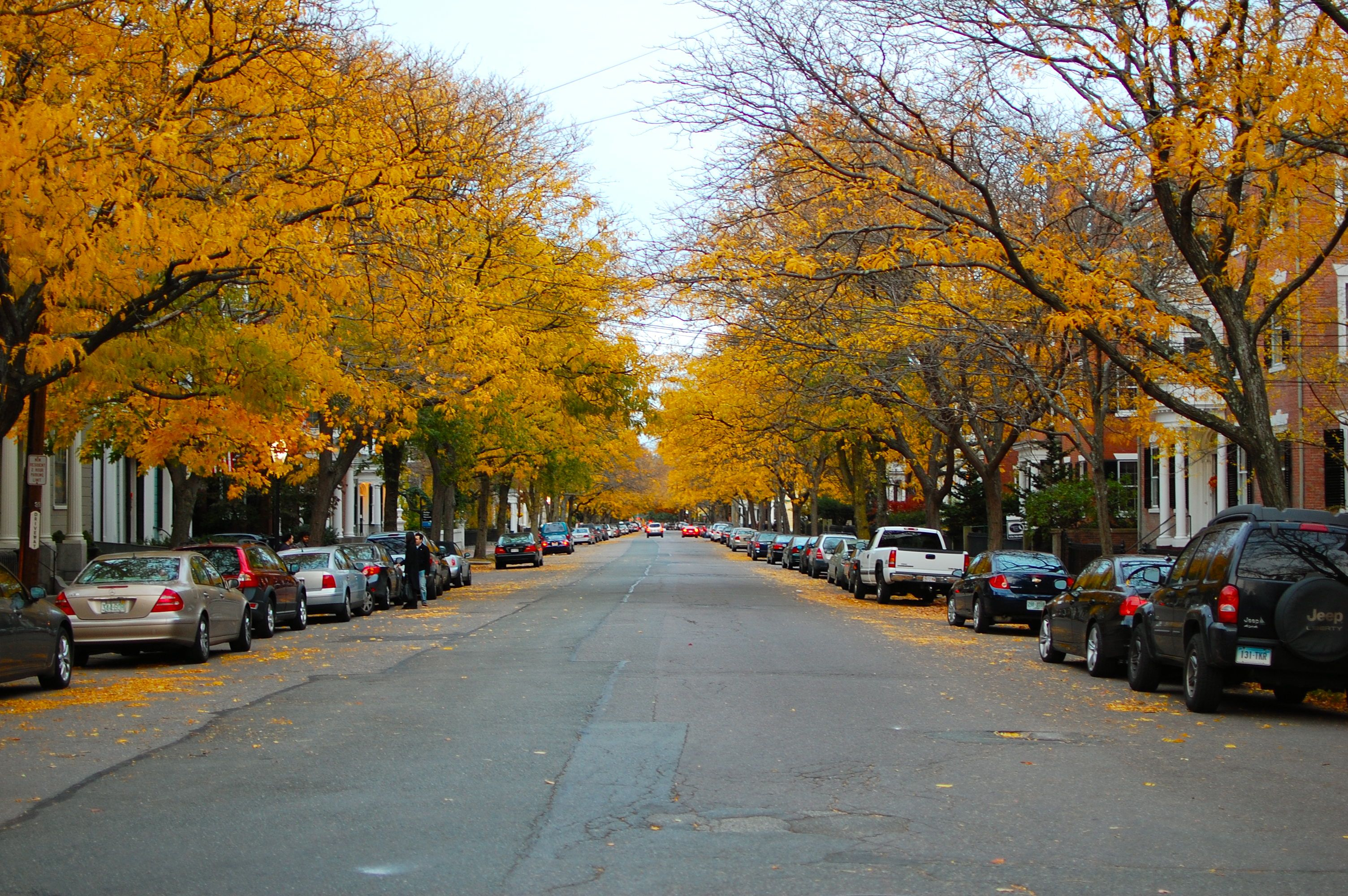
- Looking east on Chestnut Street in the fall

- Location within Massachusetts Location within the United States
- Location: Roughly bounded by Bridge, Lynn, Beckford, and River Sts., Salem, Massachusetts
- Coordinates: 42°31′13″N 70°54′8″W
- Area: 45 acres (18 ha) (original size); 2.5 acres (1.0 ha) (size of 1978 increase)
- Built: 1651
- Architect: Multiple
- Architectural style: Mid 19th Century Revival, Colonial, Federal
- NRHP reference No.: 73000312 (original); 78000468 (increase)

Significant dates
- Added to NRHP: August 28, 1973
- Boundary increase: October 4, 1978

The Chestnut Street District is a historic district bounded roughly by Bridge, Lynn, Beckford, and River Streets in Salem, Massachusetts. It was added to the National Register of Historic Places in 1973 and enlarged slightly in 1978. The district contains a number of architecturally significant works of Samuel McIntire, a builder and woodworker who had a house and workshop at 31 Summer Street, and who designed and built a number of these houses, and others that display the profits made in the Old China Trade by Salem's merchants. The district is a subset of a larger locally designated McIntire Historic District.

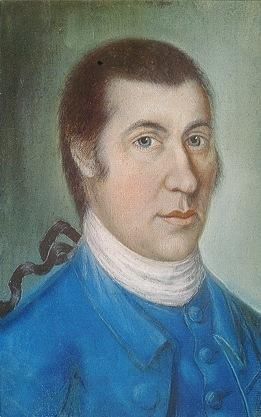
Samuel McIntire, 1786 painting by Benjamin Blyth

== Saunders House ==
The first of the great brick Federal houses to be constructed was the Thomas Saunders House at number 39 Chestnut, built in 1805 and later remodeled by Arthur Little (1893). Saunders also built the famous McIntire-designed double house next door at numbers 41-43, in 1810, as a wedding present for his daughters Mary Elizabeth and Caroline, who married brothers Leverett and Nathaniel Saltonstall. Leverett Saltonstall I was Salem's first elected mayor.

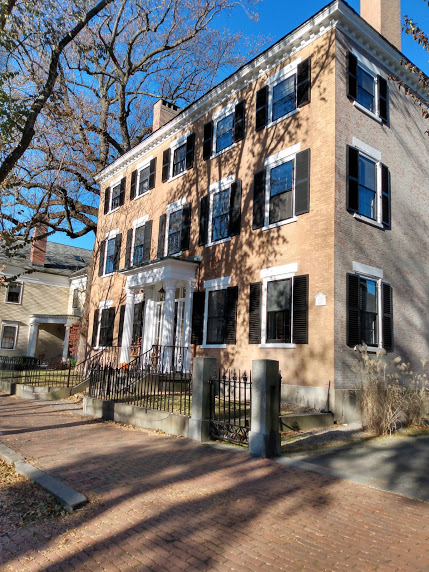
12 Chestnut Street in 2019

== Hamilton Hall ==
Hamilton Hall is a National Historic Landmark at 9 Chestnut Street in Salem, Massachusetts. Hamilton Hall was built in 1805 by Samuel McIntire and added separately to the National Register of Historic Places in 1970.

== Ropes Mansion ==
The Ropes Mansion (late 1720s), also called Ropes Memorial, is a Georgian Colonial mansion located at 318 Essex Street. It is now operated by the Peabody Essex Museum and open to the public.

== Peirce-Nichols House ==
The Peirce-Nichols House (c. 1782) is an elegant example of late-Georgian craftsmanship. It is located at 80 Federal Street, and was built for Jerathmiel Peirce, partner in the shipping firm of Waite & Peirce, owners of the Friendship and several other ships. Designed early in the career of Samuel McIntire (1757–1811), and modified later by him, the building gives a unique view into his methods and styles. It was designated a National Historic Landmark in 1973, and is now owned by the Peabody Essex Museum, which offers guided tours.

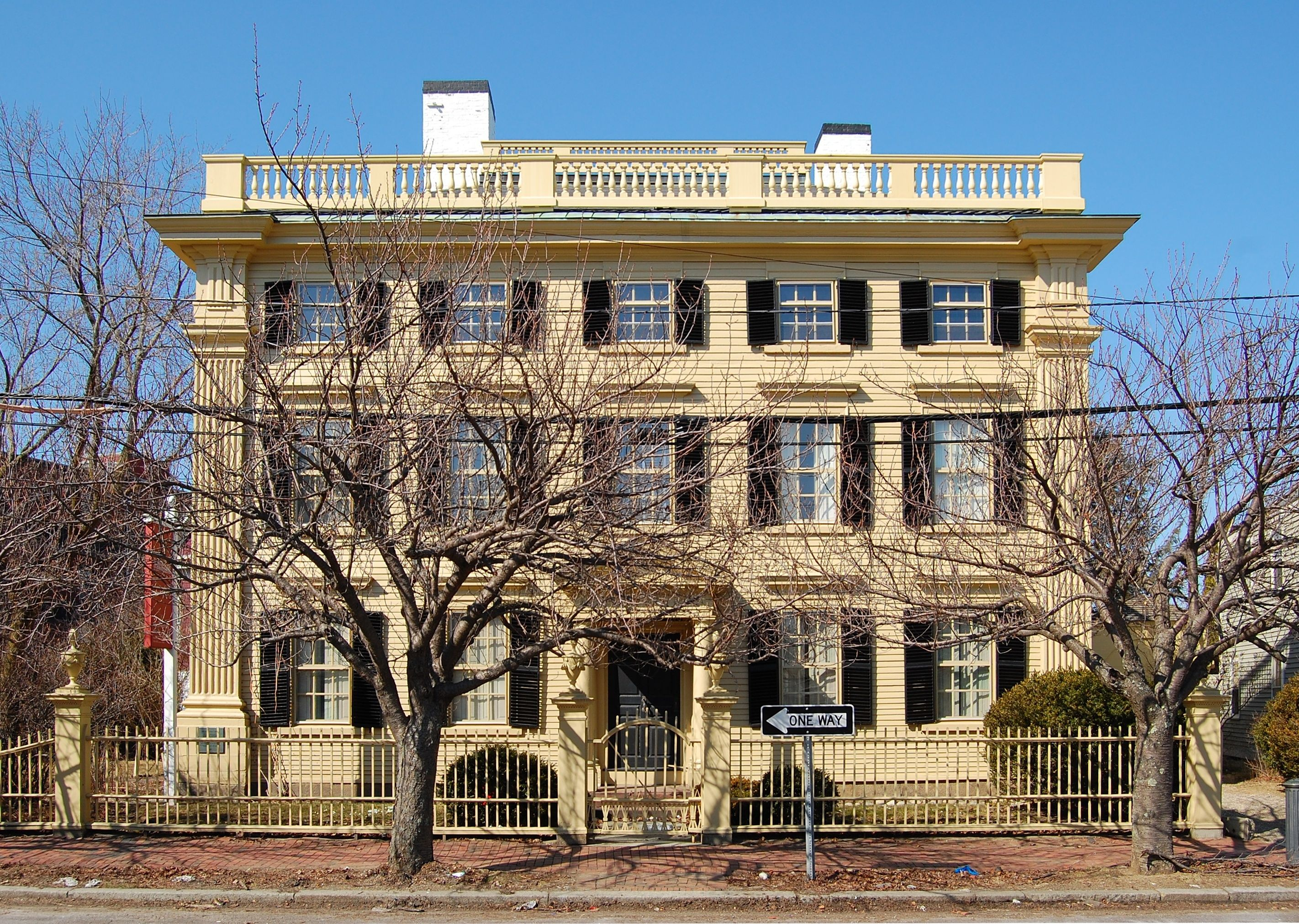
Peirce-Nichols House, 80 Federal Street, Salem, Massachusetts

== Stephen Phillips House ==
The Stephen Phillips House is located at 34 Chestnut Street. A classic car show is held every year at The Stephen Phillips House. The Phillips House is now owned and operated as a historic house museum by Historic New England and is open for public tours.

== Pickering House ==
The Pickering House (c. 1651) is a Colonial house, owned and occupied by ten successive generations of the Pickering family including Colonel Timothy Pickering. This house is believed to be the oldest house in the United States continuously occupied by one family. It is located at 18 Broad Street, Salem, Massachusetts and is open to the public under the auspices of the nonprofit Pickering Foundation.

== The Witch House, Jonathan Corwin House ==
The Witch House (also called the Jonathan Corwin House), was the home of Judge Jonathan Corwin and is the only structure still standing in Salem, Massachusetts, with direct ties to the Salem Witch Trials of 1692.

== The Salem Athenaeum ==
The Salem Athenaeum was founded in 1810 and is one of the oldest private library organizations in the United States. The Athenaeum is located at 337 Essex Street. In 1905, the Athenæum sold the building at 132 Essex Street to the Essex Institute (now the Peabody Essex Museum), and with the proceeds constructed the building it currently occupies, at 337 Essex Street. Dedicated in 1907

== Francis Cox House ==
The Francis Cox House was built in 1846 and is situated at the corner of Chestnut and Summer street.

== John Bertram Mansion ==
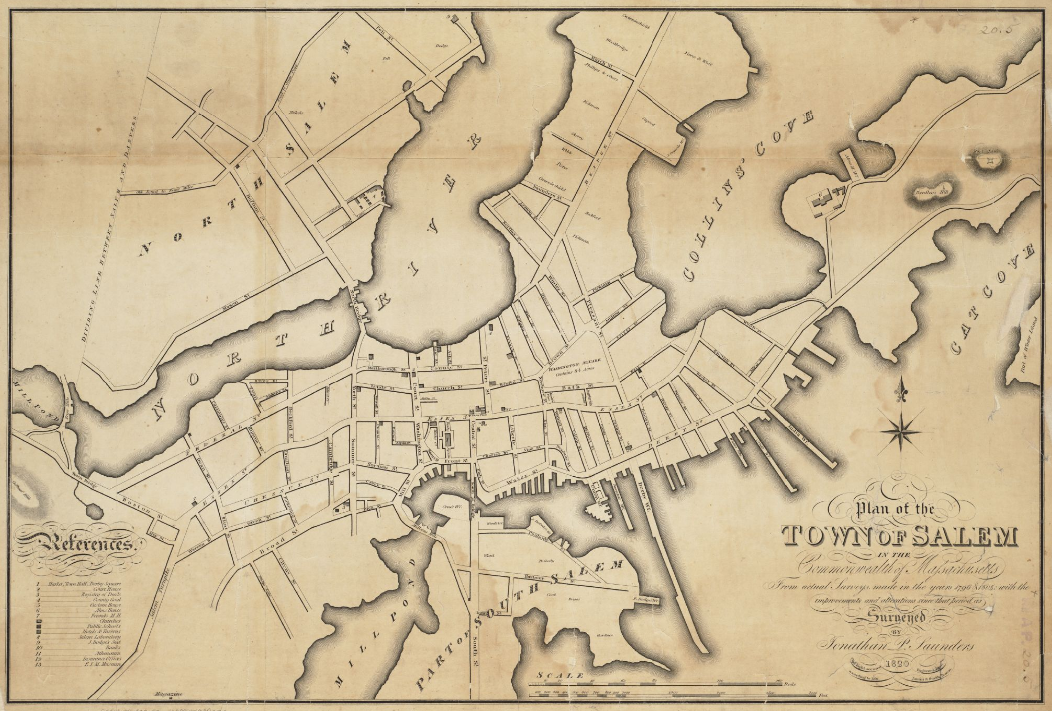
Salem, 1820

This High Style Italianate brick and brownstone mansion was built at 370 Essex Street in 1855 for Captain John Bertram When Captain John Bertram died in March 1882, his widow donated their home (The John Bertram Mansion) and this became the Salem Public Library. The Salem Public Library opened its doors on July 8, 1889.

== See also ==
- List of the oldest buildings in Massachusetts
- List of the oldest buildings in the United States
- List of historic houses in Massachusetts
- National Register of Historic Places listings in Salem, Massachusetts
- National Register of Historic Places listings in Essex County, Massachusetts
