= Salem Willows Historic District =

Historic district in Massachusetts, United States

- U.S. National Register of Historic Places
- U.S. Historic district
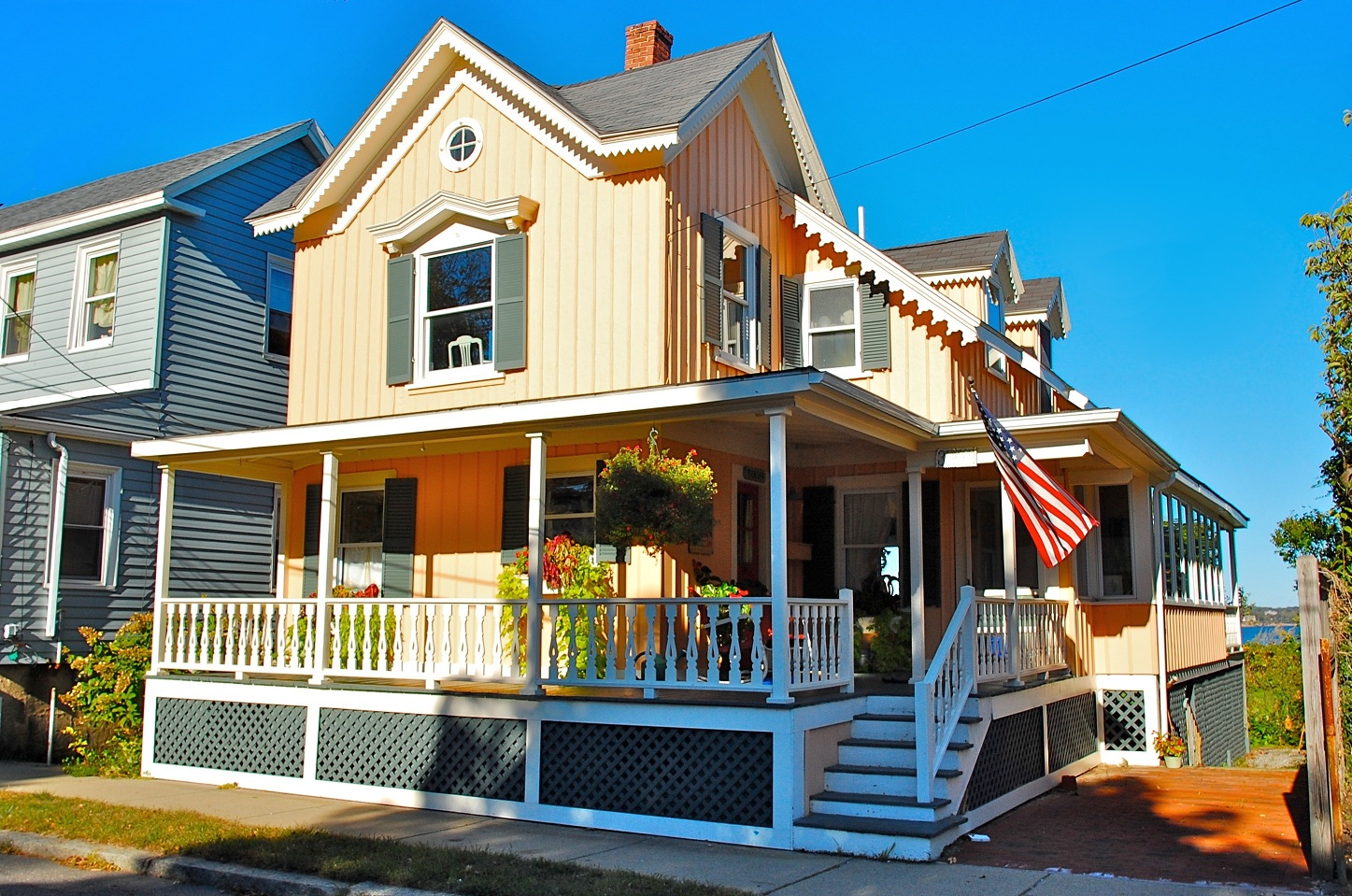
- An oceanfront home on Beach Ave with a view toward Salem Sound.

- Location within Massachusetts Location within the United States
- Location: Salem, Massachusetts
- Coordinates: 42°31′57″N 70°52′6″W
- NRHP reference No.: 94000265
- Added to NRHP: March 25, 1994

The Salem Willows Historic District of eastern Salem, Massachusetts encompasses a now residential area that had its origins as a 19th-century summer resort community. Development of the area began in 1875, after Daniel Gardner purchased land at Juniper Point he had been leasing with the intent of developing it. There is evidence from an 1874 map that he may have begun development as early as 1874, even though he did not have permission to erect permanent structures on the land then. This development grew, and a significant number of modest cottage-style houses were built between then and the early 20th century. Alongside this development, the Salem Willows Park, just to its north, began to take shape, with a casino located at Bay View and Fort Avenues, and a large pavilion at Fort and Island Avenues, visible on an 1897 map. The area became popular with day visitors, and hotels catering to tourists were built, although only one, the Central House at 1 High Avenue, has survived but as a private residence. The park is owned by the city, and continues to be used as a recreational area.

The Salem Willows Historic District was listed on the National Register of Historic Places in 1994.

== See also ==
- Salem Willows
- Winter Island
- Fort Pickering
- Fort Lee (Salem, Massachusetts)
- National Register of Historic Places listings in Salem, Massachusetts
- National Register of Historic Places listings in Essex County, Massachusetts
