= Salem Harbor =

Harbor in Massachusetts, United States

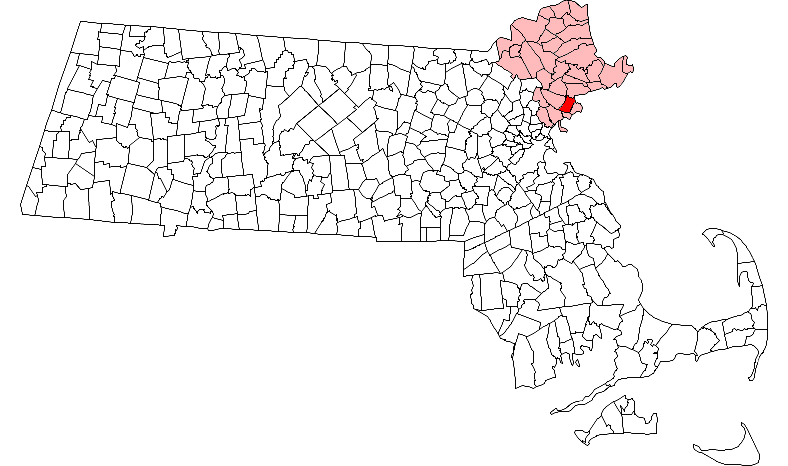
Map highlighting Salem, Massachusetts

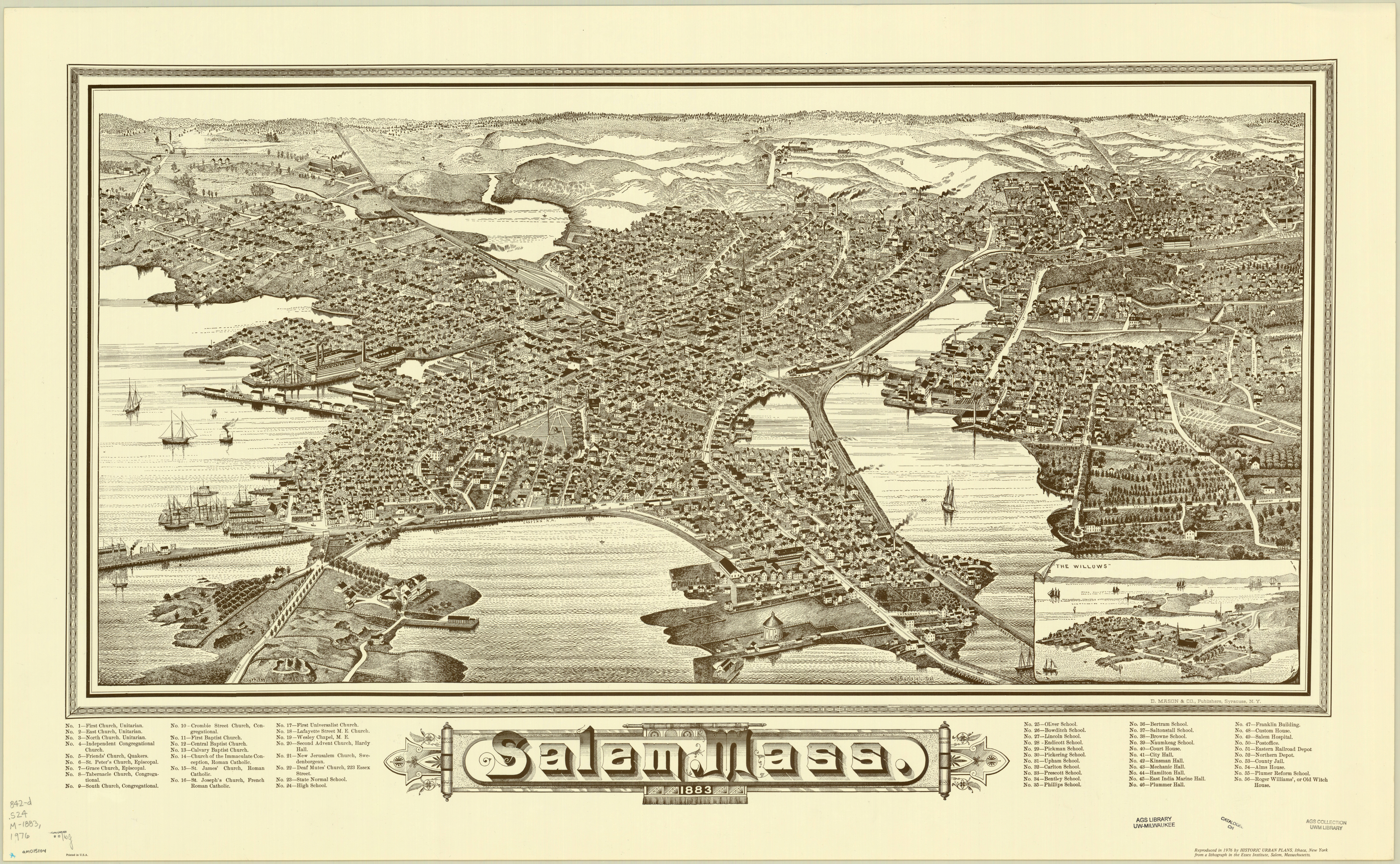
Map of Salem, Massachusetts and Harbor, 1883

Salem Harbor is a harbor in northeastern Massachusetts spanning an area north and south of Salem. Historically the Salem Harbor was the site of one of the major international ports in the colonies. During the American Revolutionary War, merchant ships were enlisted as privateers, an important role to augment the ill-prepared Continental Navy. In 1790, Salem Harbor was a world-famous seaport and sixth-largest in the United States of America. Now the harbor is used for commercial and recreational purposes and the Salem Maritime National Historic Site is very popular with tourists from around the world.

== History ==
The harbor was defended by Fort Miller in Marblehead from 1632 to 1865, and by Fort Pickering on Winter Island from 1643 to 1865.

Salem merchants defended the colonies during the American Revolutionary War through privateering. When the 13 colonies declared independence, the Continental Navy had only 31 ships. To support their efforts Letters of Marque were issued to private merchant ships to authorize them to attack enemy merchant ships. George Washington's Army numbered 11,000 men; there were 11,000 privateers at sea in the Atlantic, Caribbean, and between Ireland and England. One of the goals was to obtain gunpowder, outlawed for import by the British. Over 2 million pounds of gunpowder and saltpeter were brought in by the privateers and merchantmen. They also captured British soldiers and over 10,000 seamen from the British Royal Navy, for the Continental Navy the total was 16,000 captured British.

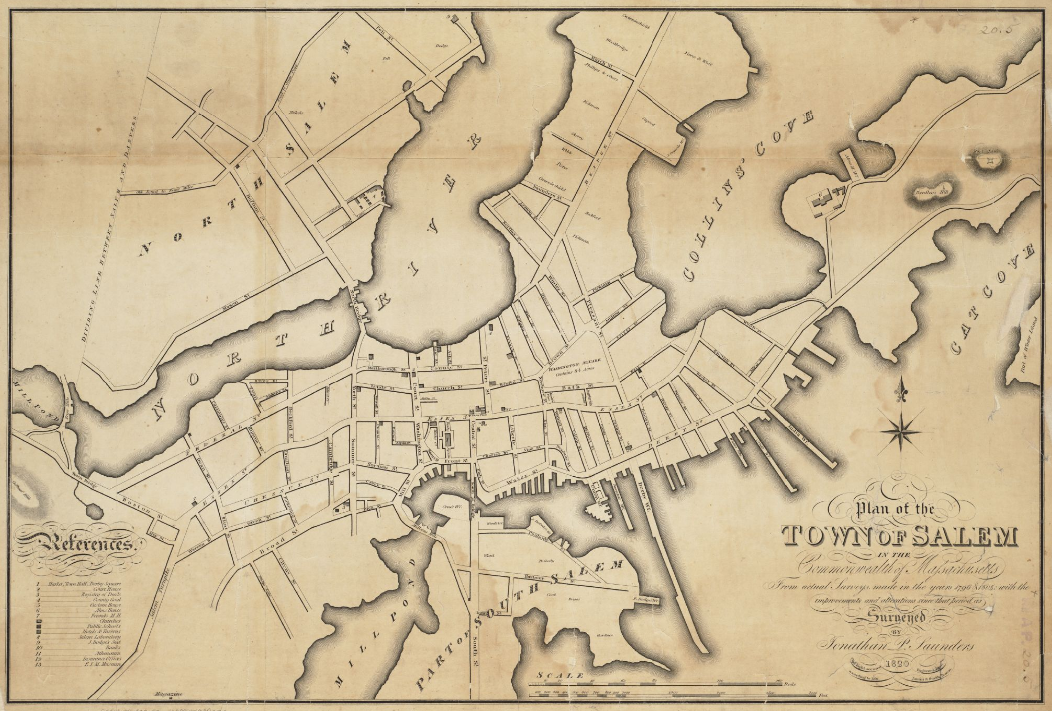
Map of Salem, Massachusetts circa 1820

Titus, a man enslaved by Mrs. John Cabot of Salem, established a business and successfully recruited Black people as privateers during the war. Captain Jonathan Haraden was considered one of the best privateers, simultaneously fighting three armed British ships. His efforts resulted in the capture of 10,000 cannons.

During the late 18th and early 19th centuries, international trade was conducted in Salem from the Atlantic coast "to the farthest ports of the rich east." Salem was one of the leading international ports by the end of the 18th century, importing ceramics, furniture, decorative arts, artificial flowers, textiles, spices and dye.

== Air Station Salem at Salem Harbor ==
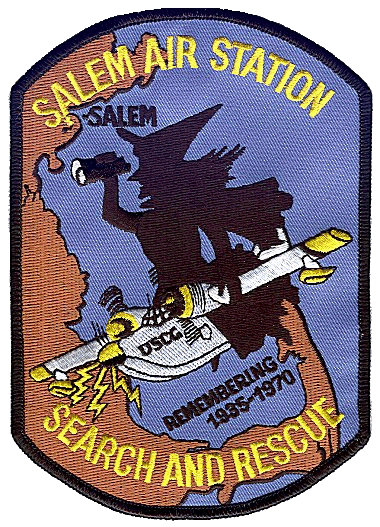
Coast Guard Air Station Salem patch

On 15 February 1935 the U.S. Coast Guard established a new seaplane facility at Salem because there was no space to expand the Gloucester Air Station at Ten Pound Island. Coast Guard Air Station Salem was located at Winter Island, an extension of Salem Neck which juts out into Salem Harbor. Search and rescue, hunting for derelicts and medical evacuations were the Station's primary areas of responsibility. During the first year of operation, Salem crews performed 26 med-evac missions. They flew in all kinds of weather and the radio direction capabilities of the aircraft were of significant value in locating vessels in distress.

During World War II, air crews from Salem flew neutrality patrols along the coast and the Air Station roster grew to 37 aircraft. Anti-submarine patrols were flown on a regular basis. In October 1944, Air Station Salem was officially designated as the first Air-Sea Rescue station on the eastern seaboard. The Martin PBM Mariner, a hold-over from the war, became the primary rescue aircraft. In the mid-1950s helicopters came as did Grumman HU-16 Albatross amphibious flying boats (UFs). Salem Harbor was deep enough to host a seadrome with three sea lanes, offering a variety of take-off headings irrespective of wind direction unless there was a strong steady wind from the east. This produced large waves that swept into the mouth of the harbor making water operations difficult. When the seadrome was too rough, returning amphibian aircraft would use Naval Auxiliary Air Facility Beverly. Salem Air Station moved to Cape Cod in 1970.

In 2011 The City of Salem made it official the plans for the tip of the 30-acre Winter Island Park and squared off against residents who are against bringing two power generating windmills to the tip of Winter Island. The Renewable Energy Task Force, along with Energy and Sustainability Manager Paul Marquis, have recommended the construction of a 1.5-megawatt power turbine at the tip of Winter Island, which is the furthest point from residences and where the winds are the strongest. The results of the City of Salem wind tests can be viewed.

The nearly 30-acre park has been open to the public since the early 1970s. In 2011 a master plan was developed with help from the planning and design firm The Cecil Group of Boston and Bioengineering Group of Salem and the City of Salem paid $45,000 in federal money. In the long term the projected cost to rehabilitate just the barracks is $1.5 million. But in the short term, there are multiple lower-cost items like a proposed $15,000 for a kayak dock or $50,000 to relocate and improve the bathhouse. This is a very important project since Fort Pickering guarded Salem Harbor as far back as the 17th century.

== Closing of the Salem Coal Plant and redevelopment of the 63-acre waterfront site ==
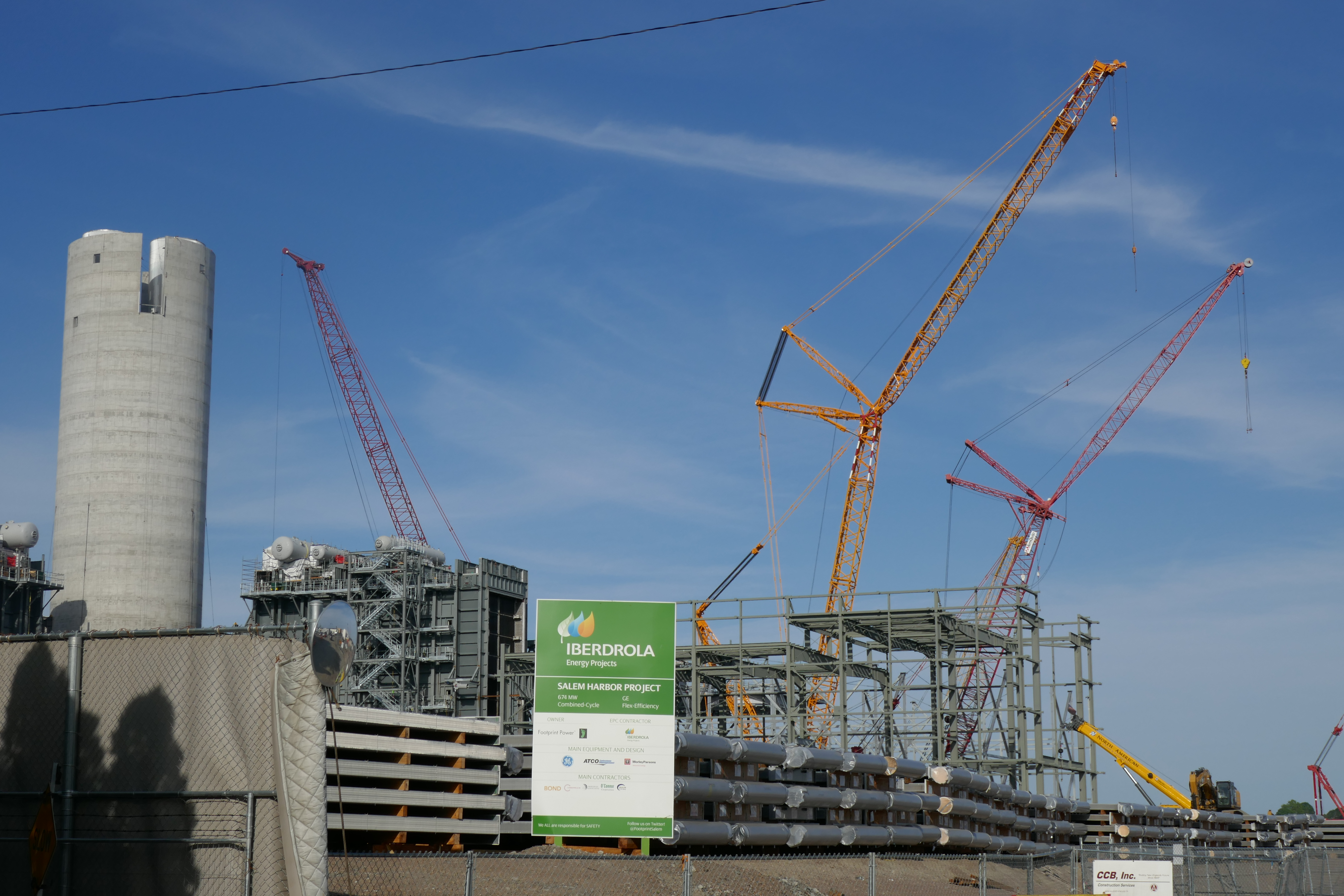
Construction of the Salem Harbor Station

In May 2011 and after years of legal battles, protests and one recent fatal accident has led the owner of the Salem Harbor Power Station to announce it will close down the facility permanently. Salem Harbor Station is a 60-year-old coal- and oil-burning power plant that is owned by Dominion of Virginia and have said with the approval of ISO New England, the 60-year-old coal and oil-fired plant will close for good in June 2014. The City of Salem was awarded a $200,000 grant from the Clean Energy Center prior to the closure of the plant and with the closure scheduled for June 2014, this grant money is being used to plan for the eventual re-use of this property. That study is underway and we are working with engineers and land use planners on re-use options. The City of Salem has been reaching out to state and federal officials to ask for their cooperation and assistance in planning for the future and money to clean up The Salem Harbor Power Plant 62 Acre Site.

Footprint Power, a startup New Jersey–based energy company, announced on the 29th of June 2012 that it has signed an agreement to acquire Salem Harbor Station power plant from Dominion Energy of Virginia. Footprint said it plans to “remediate” a 63-acre waterfront site that has towering smokestacks, a coal pile and oil tanks. A city study estimated cleanup costs at more than $50 million. The plan is to develop a natural gas plant on one-third of the property, reportedly a site along Fort Avenue near the city’s ferry landing. The remainder of the waterfront property eventually will be used for commercial and industrial redevelopment, the company said. “The transition will not only stabilize our property tax base, but also provide cleaner, more efficient and reliable energy. Footprint said its plans are consistent with the recommendations of a city study completed earlier this year on the future use of the power plant site. The City of Salem will require Footprint to demolish the existing plant and stacks, we will restore some 30 to 40 acres of our waterfront to its vibrant and prosperous past.” Mayor Kim Driscoll said she has not had “detailed” talks yet with Footprint but is encouraged by discussions so far. As of December 2013, there were many appeals under way from various groups who do not want the plant built. The main opponent fighting in court was the Conservation Law Foundation, a leading environmental advocacy group intent on blocking the plant from being built. State Rep. Lori Ehrlich is the State Representative for the Massachusetts 8th Essex District and is a vocal opponent of a new power plant being constructed in Salem. It was announced in December 2013 that the Massachusetts Supreme Judicial Court will hear the case on whether not to build or build the new plant in March 2014.

The new Salem Harbor Power Station went online in May 2018.

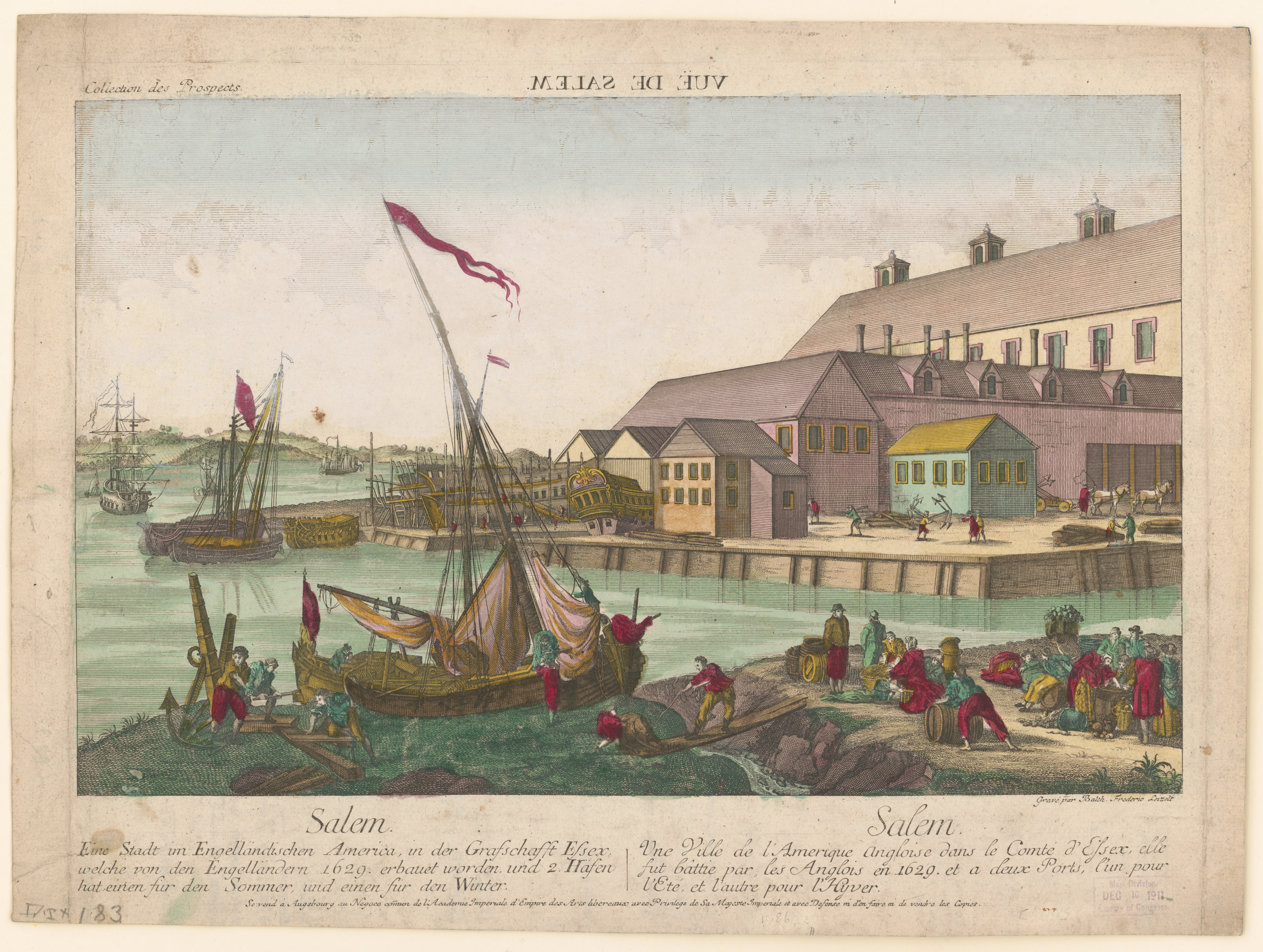
Salem Harbor and its shipping industry, 1770s

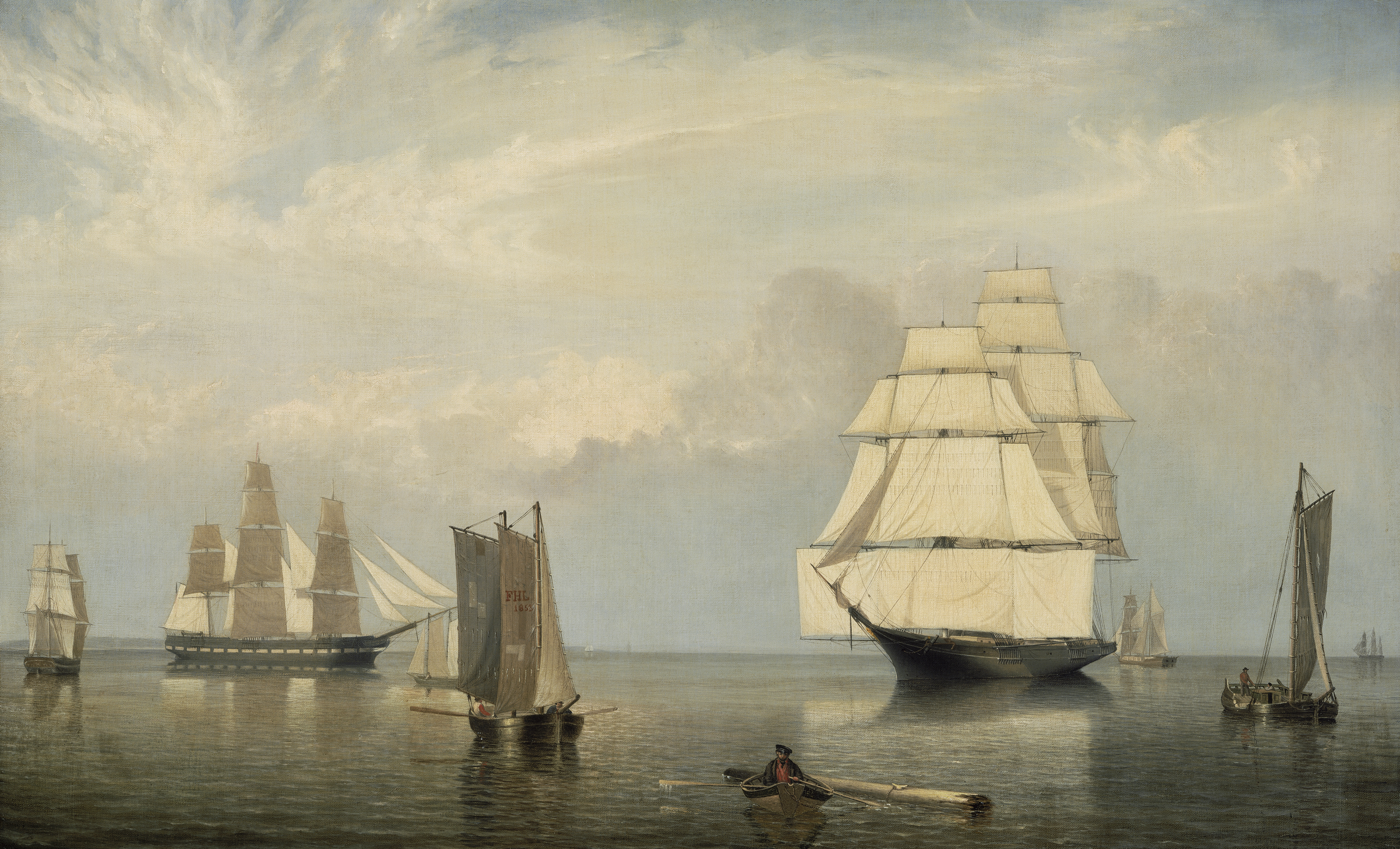
Salem Harbor, oil on canvas, Fitz Henry Lane, 1853. Museum of Fine Arts, Boston

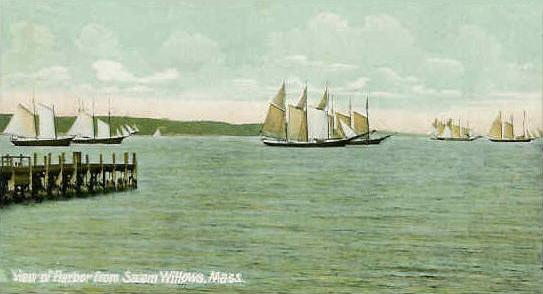
Salem Harbor, 1907

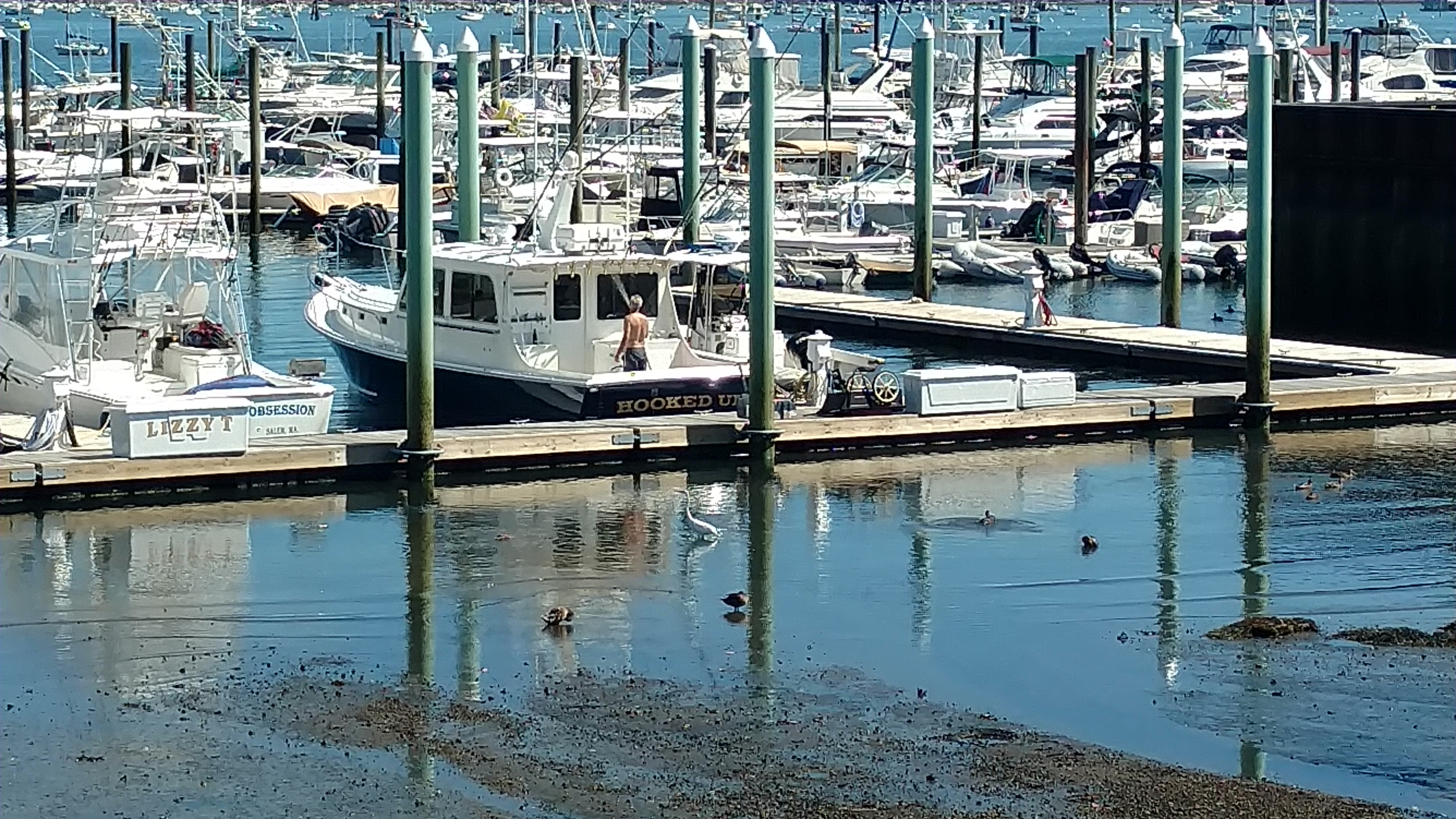
Boats moored in the harbor, 2018

=== The Salem Ferry ===
The “Nathaniel Bowditch”, is a 92-foot-high speed catamaran that travels from Salem to Boston in 50 minutes from May to October and had its maiden voyage on June 22, 2006. The Salem Ferry is named after Nathaniel Bowditch, who was from Salem and wrote the American Practical Navigator. Since 2006 ridership increased every year, and peaked in 2010 with 89,000, but in 2011 service was cut back because of the dramatic rise in fuel prices.

The ferry was purchased by the current mayor of Salem, Kim Driscoll, with the use of grant money that covered 90 percent of the $2.1 million purchase price. Because of the cutback in service during the 2011 season, Mayor Kim Driscoll is now seeking a new operator who can run the ferry seven days a week from May to October.

For the 2012 Season Boston Harbor Cruises will be taking over the running of the Salem Ferry with seven-day service and a Monday-to-Friday 7 a.m. commuter ferry to Boston. The Salem Ferry will be running seven days a week for the 2012 season from Memorial Day to Halloween.

Still running strong and for the 2017 Season Boston Harbor Cruises will once again be running the Salem Ferry to Boston.

=== Salem Waterfront, cruise ships, and the Blaney Street pier renovation ===
The first step in the redevelopment was in 2006, when the State of Massachusetts gave Salem $1,000,000. The bulk of the money – $750,000 – is earmarked for acquisition of the Blaney Street landing, the private, 2-acre site off Derby Street used by the ferry. Another $200,000 was approved for the design of the new Salem wharf, a large pier planned for the landing, which officials said could be used by small cruise ships, commercial vessels and fishing boats.

In October 2010, Mayor Kimberley Driscoll announced that the city will formally acquire the Blaney Street parcel from Dominion Energy, paving the way for the Salem Wharf project. The City of Salem secured $1.25 million from the Massachusetts Seaport Advisory Council and $2.5 million in federal grant dollars to move forward with the construction of the project. The City acquired the parcel with the help of a $1.7 million grant received from the Seaport Advisory Council.

The City of Salem's plans call for a total build-out of the current Blaney Street pier, known as the Salem Wharf project. When finished, The Blaney Street pier will be home to small to medium-sized cruise ships, commercial vessels and The Salem Ferry. This project is fully engineered and permitted. In 2010, examples of work to be finished in this early phase that will be complete for the 2011 Season, a contractor is running underground utility cables and erecting an interim terminal building that will be used by the Salem Ferry, replacing the current trailer. The building will have an indoor bathroom – a first at the ferry landing – along with a waiting room and possibly an outdoor area with awnings. Also new for 2011 is a paved lot with about 140 parking spaces replacing the existing dirt parking lot.

Also in 2011, construction crews have been building a long seawall at the Blaney Street landing, which runs from the edge of the ferry dock back toward Derby Street and along an inner harbor. This is one of the early and key pieces of the Salem Pier, which the city hopes to have completed by 2014 and is the key to eventually bring cruise ships to Salem.

At the end of the 2011 season of the Salem Ferry, In the late fall of 2011, after the ferry season ends, contractors will start building the first section of the T-shaped, 350-foot pier. Work on that phase was scheduled to be completed by the fall of 2012. As of April 2011, The City Of Salem has secured half of the $20 million and still needs to secure about $10 million in state and federal funds to complete this waterfront pier.

In November 2013, The City of Salem received $4,000,000 from the Massachusetts Seaport Advisory Council to build an extension to Salem Wharf & other improvements that will eventually accommodate Cruise ships to Salem Harbor.

Salem Maritime National Historic Site is run by the National Park Service who manages all U.S. national parks, many American national monuments, and other conservation and historical properties with various title designations. It was created on August 25, 1916, by Congress through the National Park Service Organic Act.

In 2024 it was announced that Derby Wharf will be having millions pumped in to stabilize of Central wharves & Derby Wharf from future erosion. The objective is to provide more protection against future erosion and is scheduled to begin on the 28th of May 2024.

== Geography ==
Salem Harbor is located at 42°31′25″N 70°51′58″W According to the United States Census Bureau, the city of Salem has a total area of 18.1 square miles (46.8 km²), of which, 8.1 square miles (21.0 km²) of it is land and 9.9 square miles (25.8 km²) of it (55.09%) is water.

Salem Harbor divides the city from much of neighboring Marblehead to the southeast, and Beverly Harbor and divides the city from Beverly along with the Danvers River, which feeds into the harbor. Between the two harbors lies Salem Neck and Winter Island, which are divided from each other by Cat Cove, Smith Pool (located between the two land causeways to Winter Island) and Juniper Cove.

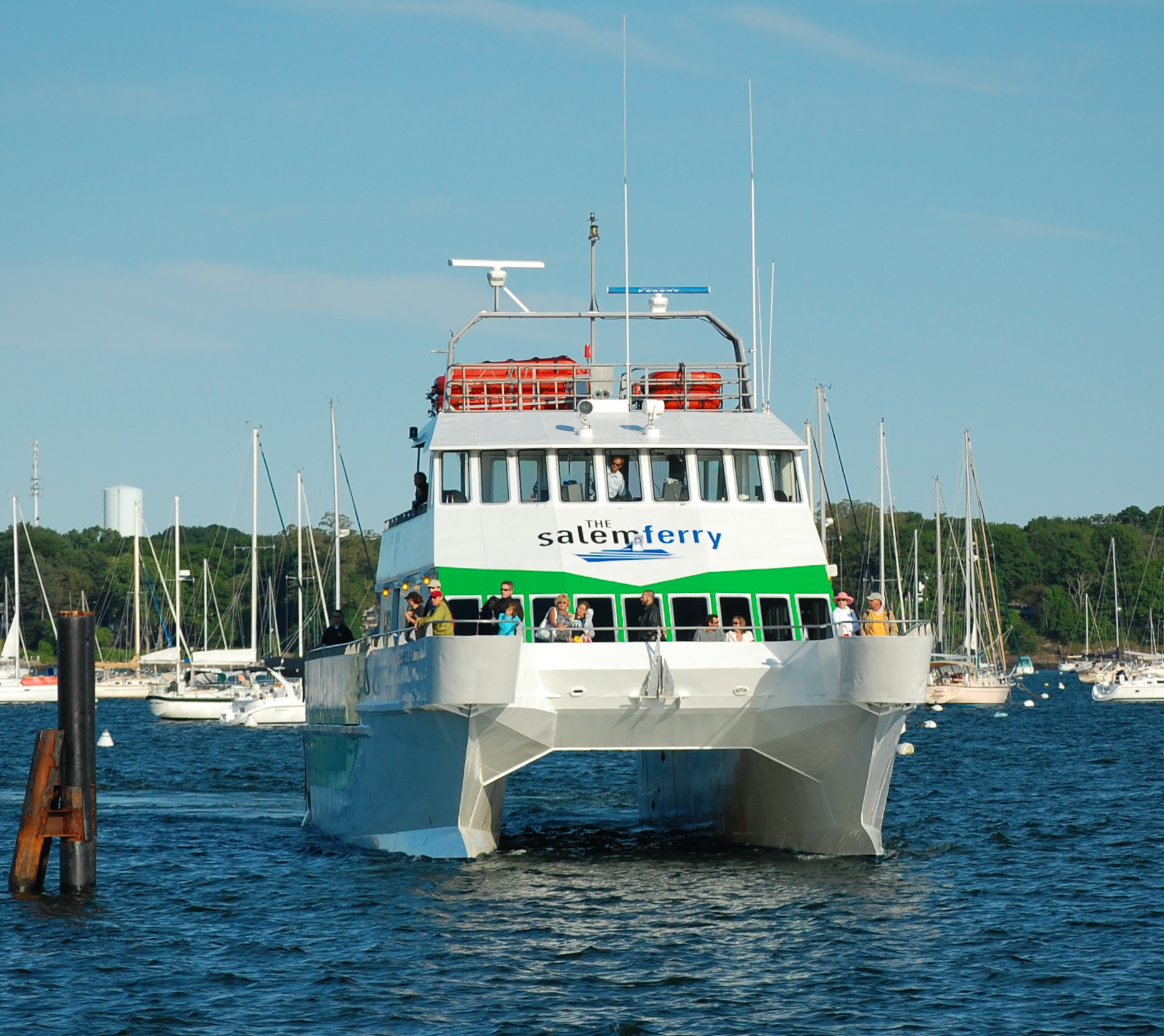
The Salem Ferry, Salem Harbor, Massachusetts

In celebration of Nathaniel Bowditch and his work writing the New American Practical Navigator, first published in 1802, is still carried on board every commissioned U.S. Naval vessel., in his hometown of Salem, Massachusetts there is The Salem Ferry, named after Bowditch, a High Speed Catamaran takes people to Boston and is pictured as it is approaching its dock off Blaney Street, Salem Maritime National Historic Site.

Salem is the second deepest of the five ports in Massachusetts. Within its harbor are commercial and recreational vessels. There are over 1,600 permitted recreational boats in Salem waters and an estimated 8,000 moored or slipped recreational boats using the waters of Salem Sound. Inside the harbor, the electric power plant receives shipments of coal and oil from around the world. Mid-size cruise ships navigate and drop anchor in the harbor.

The Harbormaster Department operates 24 hours a day. It has its own separate city department under the control of the Mayor of Salem and is also a sub-division of the Police Department.

== The Salem Maritime National Historic Site at Salem Harbor ==
The Salem Maritime National Historic Site is a National Historic Site consisting of 12 historic structures, one replica tall-ship, and about 9 acres (36,000 m^{2}) of land along the waterfront of Salem Harbor in Salem, Massachusetts. Salem Maritime is the first National Historic Site established in the United States (March 17, 1938). It interprets the Triangle Trade during the colonial period, in cotton, rum, sugar and slaves; the actions of privateers during the American Revolution; and global maritime trade with the Far East, after independence. The National Park Service manages both the National Historic Site and a Regional Visitor Center in downtown Salem. The National Park Service (NPS) is an agency of the United States Department of the Interior.

In 2014, the National Park Service, which runs the Salem Maritime National Historic Site, released figures and statistics for 2012: there were 756,038 visitors to Salem who spent an estimated $40,000,000. The National Park Service is celebrating its 100th anniversary in 2016.

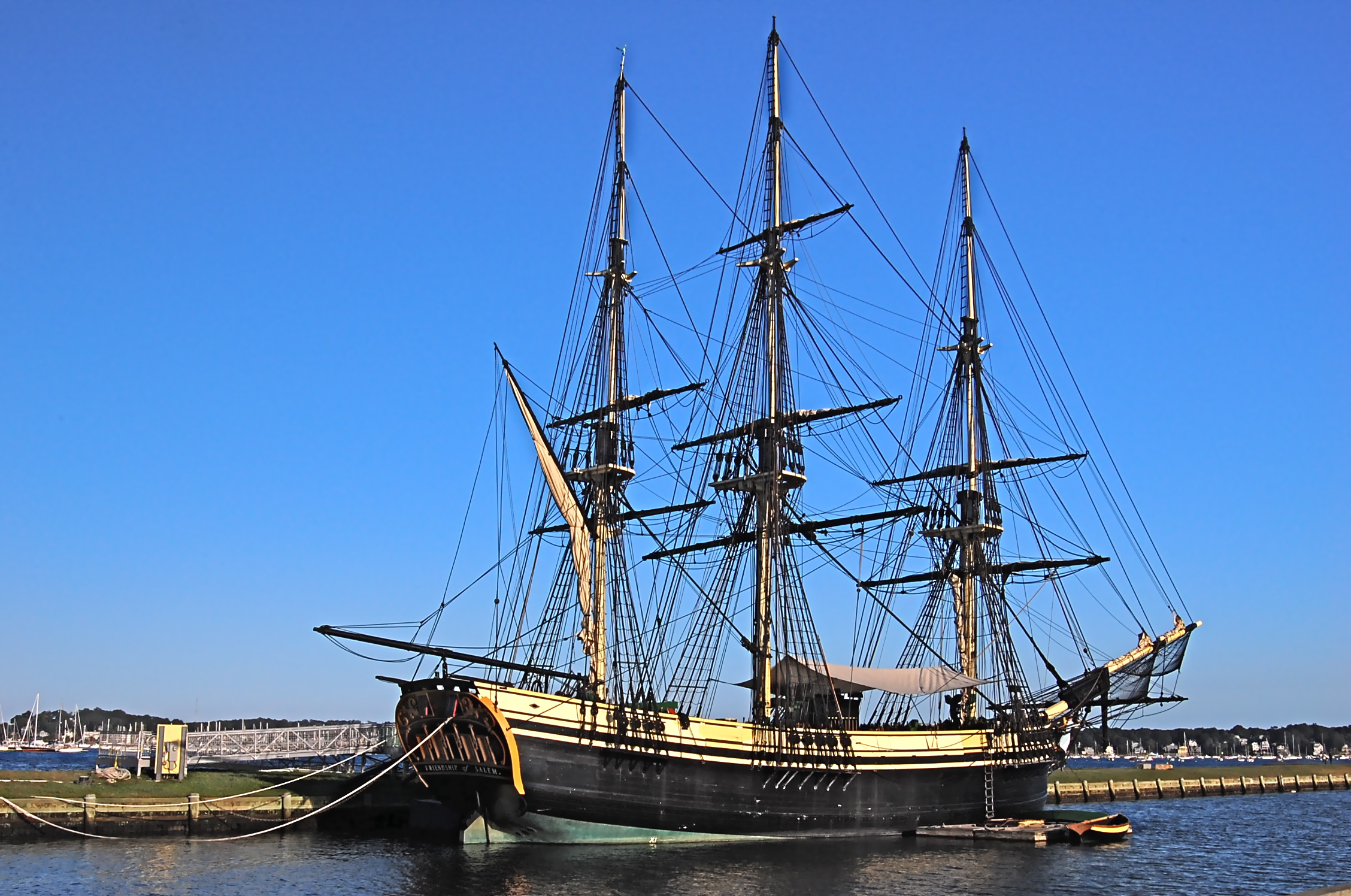
The Friendship replica docked off Derby Street

== Marinas, yachts and docks ==
The following organizations are located in or near the Salem Harbor:

Marinas

- Pickering Wharf Marina with transient dockage
- Hawthorne Cove Marina with transient dockage and moorings
- Nearby Port Marina in Beverly offers gas and diesel service.

Yacht Clubs

- The Salem Willows Yacht Club which sells non-diesel fuel to the public in season.
- Palmers Cove Yacht Club, located inside the inner harbor.
- Dions Yacht Yard
- Hawthorne Cove Marina
- Winter Island Yacht Yard

Public docks

- Winter Island Recreational Park at the mouth of the harbor
- Kernwood Marina, located up the Danvers river
- Salem Willows Park pier
- At the Congress Street bridge, next to Pickering wharf

== Mooring fields ==
Within the harbor, there are six mooring fields:

Location	Designated Area	Comments
From the Kernwood Bridge to the Beverly Bridge in the Danvers River	S	There is a long waiting list and very little turnover.
From the Beverly Bridge to Monument Bar	A	There is very little space here and poor access from shore. This area is predominantly used by two Yacht Clubs, the Jubilee and Salem Willows.
From Monument Bar to Winter Island Light	L	There is space available but poor access and exposure to severe weather.
From the Power Plant Jetty to Derby Wharf Light	E	There is very little available space and poor public access here.
From Derby Light to Forest River	M	There is room in this area but the water is shallow and access poor.
From Winter Island Light to the Power Plant Jetty	WI	There is available space and good access from Winter Island Park.
