= Smith Pool =

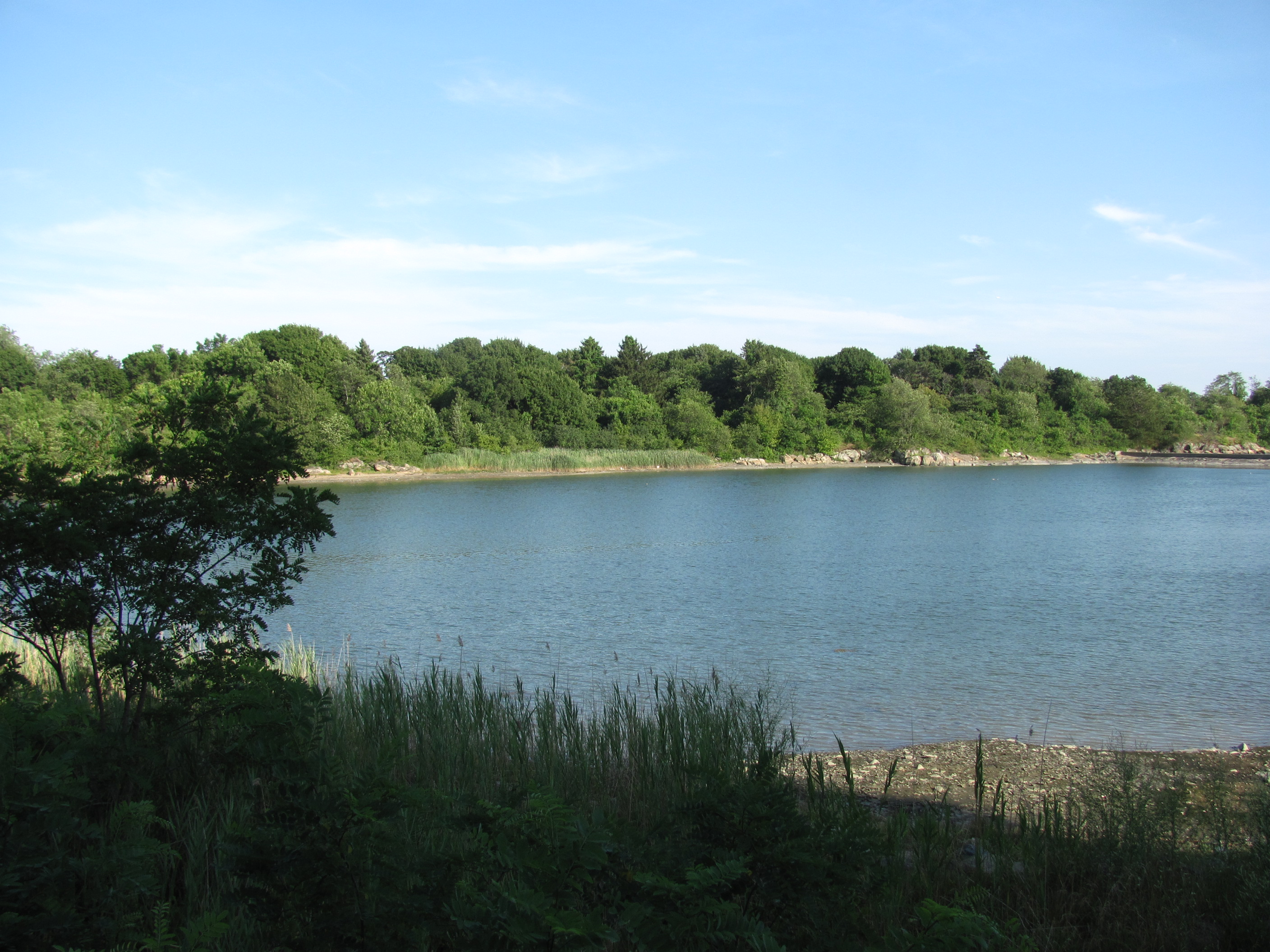
- Smith Pool

- Location within Massachusetts
- Location: Salem Neck, Salem, Massachusetts, United States
- Coordinates: 42°31′48.9″N 70°52′15.1″W
- Type: reservoir

Smith Pool is a small body of water located between Salem Neck, Winter Island, and Cat Cove in Salem, Massachusetts, United States. It used to be the city's reservoir, and a public swimming area, having been established in 1934 as part of a Public Works Project. It was called the Smith pool as a result of Salemite Ida Smith who donated $20,000 in the memory of her late husband, J.C.B. Smith.

It is easily accessible from Winter Island Road on Winter Island. The area is currently maintained by the Massachusetts Division of Marine Fisheries, and the old dam still separates it from Cat Cove. The dam has a tide gate to allow circulation between Cat Cove and Smith Pool and to allow manipulation of the water depth in Smith Pool. The intake pipes for the Cat Cove Marine Lab seawater system are in Smith Pool.
