= Fort Pickering Light =

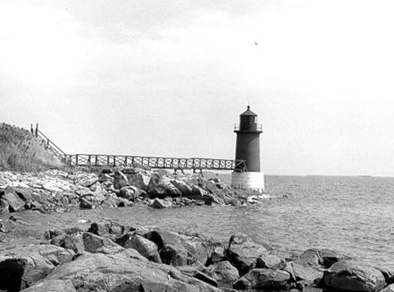
- US Coast Guard photo
- Location: Salem, Massachusetts
- Coordinates: 42°31′35.3″N 70°51′59.3″W

Tower
- Constructed: 1871
- Foundation: Concrete
- Construction: Cast iron and brick
- Automated: solar 1995
- Shape: Conical tower
- Markings: White
- Heritage: National Register of Historic Places contributing property

Light
- First lit: 1983
- Deactivated: 1969-1983
- Focal height: 28 feet (8.5 m)
- Characteristic: Fl W 4s
- Fort Pickering Light
- U.S. Historic district – Contributing property
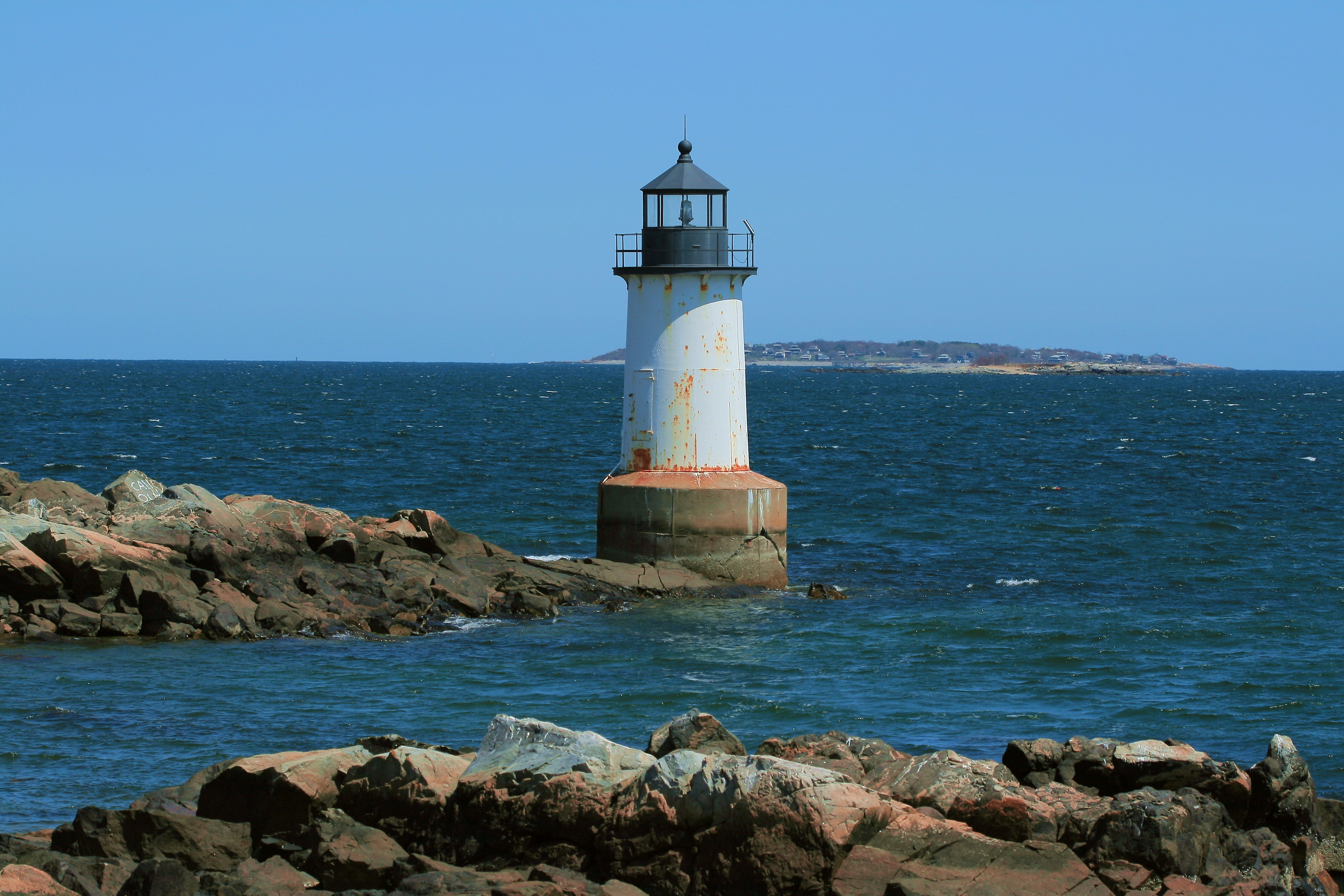
- 2008
- Location: Salem, Massachusetts
- Area: 45 acres (18 ha)
- Architectural style: Multiple
- Part of: Winter Island Historic District and Archeological District (ID94000335)
- Designated CP: April 14, 1994

Fort Pickering Light, also known as Winter Island Light, is a lighthouse built in 1871 and discontinued by the Coast Guard in 1969. It was relit as a private aid to navigation by the City of Salem in 1983.

Winter Island Light is a constituent part of the Winter Island Historic District and Archeological District, which was added to the National Register of Historic Places on April 14, 1994.

== See also ==
- National Register of Historic Places listings in Salem, Massachusetts
- List of lighthouses in the United States, Massachusetts
- Fort Pickering
