= Juniper Cove =

Cove in Salem, Massachusetts

Coordinates: 42°31′55″N 70°52′08″W

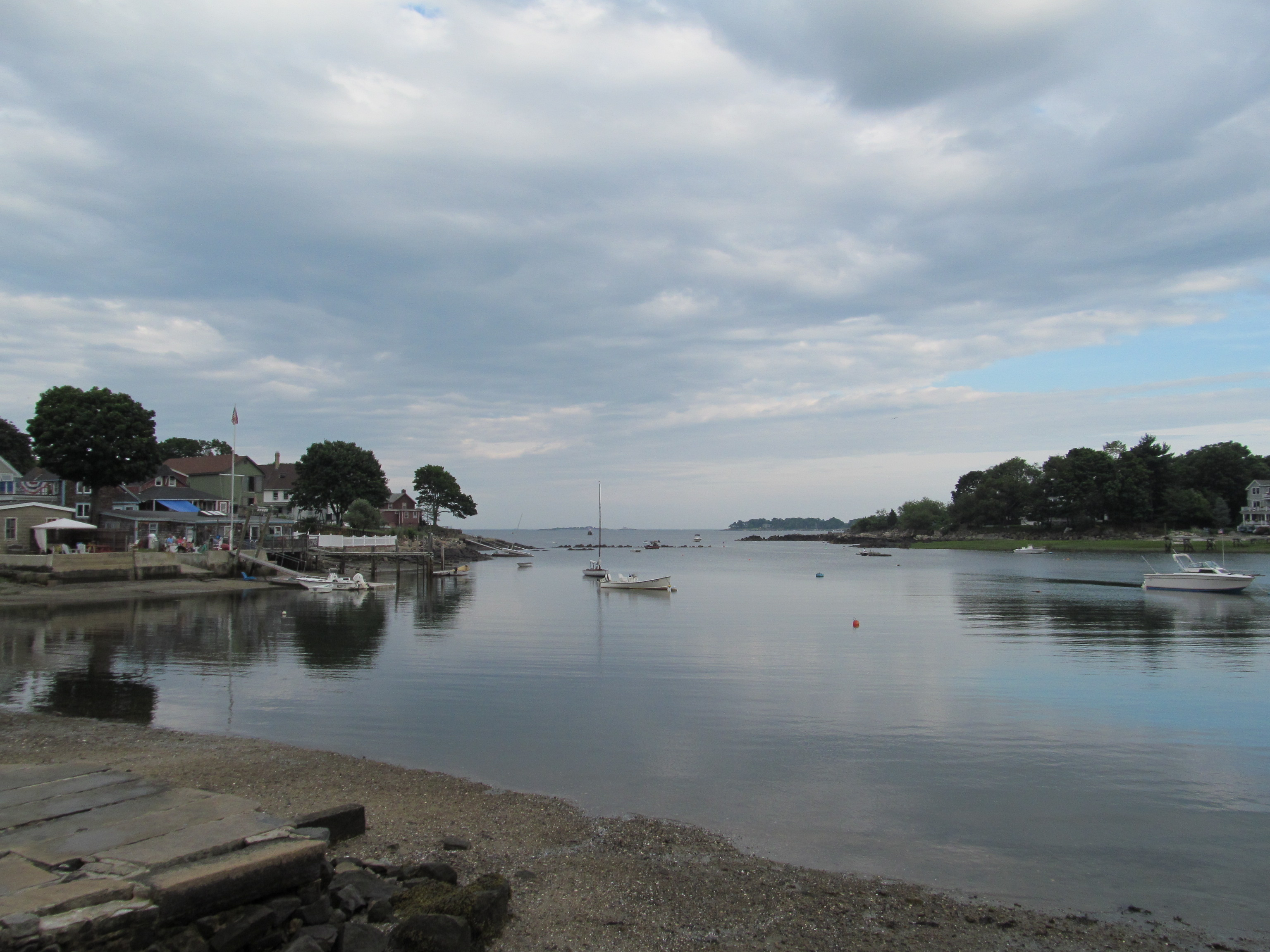
Juniper Cove

Juniper Cove is a cove in the Salem Channel, within the city limits of Salem, Massachusetts, USA. The Salem Neck coast that borders Juniper Cove is mostly residential areas.
