= Cat Cove =

Cove in Massachusetts, United States

Coordinates: 42.5278°N 70.8726°W

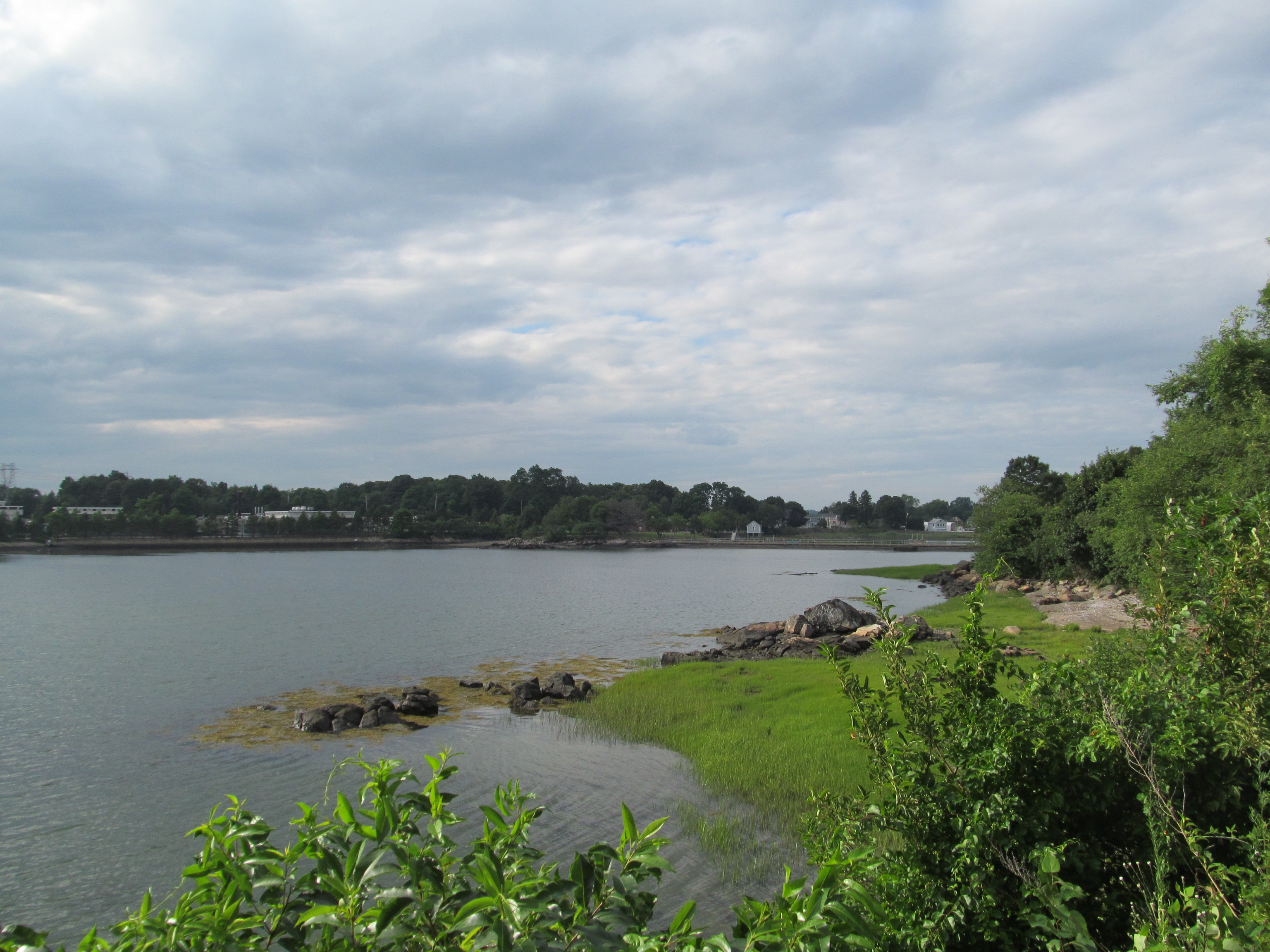
Cat Cove

Cat Cove is a cove in the northwestern portion of Salem Harbor in Salem, Massachusetts. The cove is located between Winter Island and Salem Neck. There is a powerplant located on the coast of Salem Neck bordering the southwestern edge of Cat Cove, as well as a marine laboratory.
