= Coast Guard Air Station Salem =

Former US Coast Guard base in Salem, Massachusetts

- Winter Island, Salem, Massachusetts
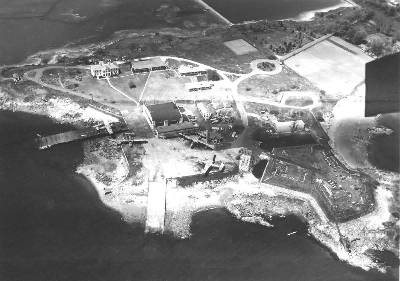
- Aerial view of CGAS Salem, 1952

Site information
- Type: Seaplane base
- Owner: City of Salem
- Open to the public: partly

Location
- Location in Massachusetts Coast Guard Air Station Salem (the United States)
- Coordinates: 42°31′35″N 70°52′07″W

Site history
- Built: 1935
- Built by: US Coast Guard
- In use: 1935–1970
- Battles/wars: World War II; Cold War

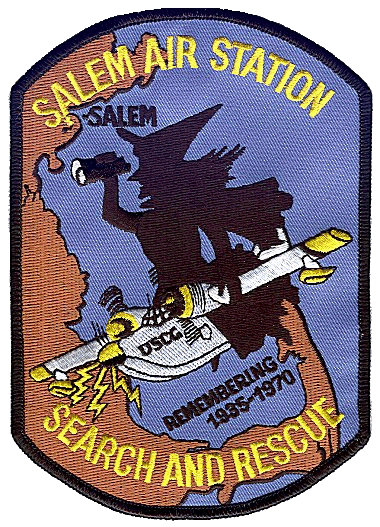
Coast Guard Air Station Salem Patch

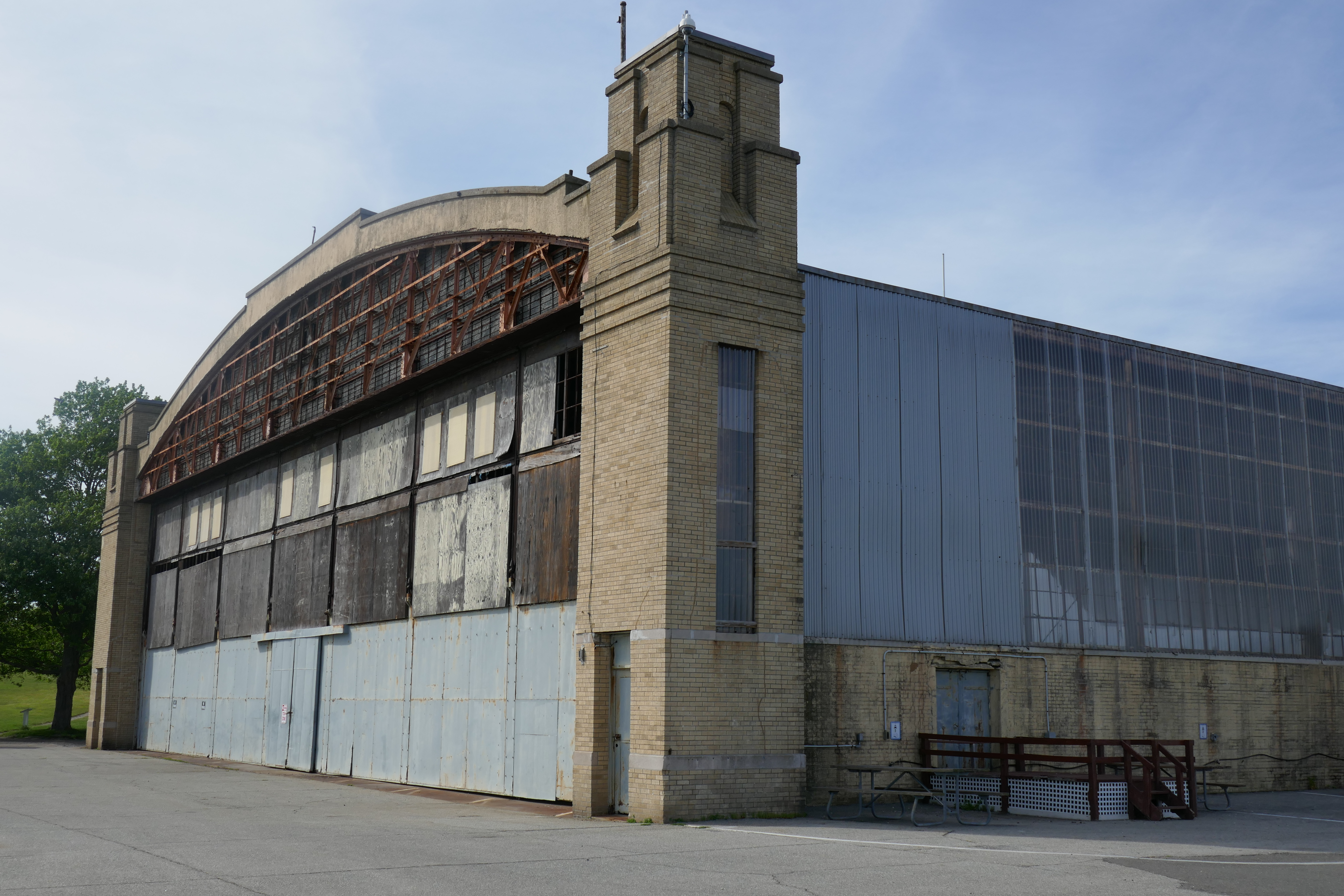
Abandoned seaplane hangar at former CGAS Salem, 2016

Coast Guard Air Station Salem was a United States Coast Guard air station located in Salem, Massachusetts from 1935 to 1970. Its area of coverage extended from New York City to the Canada–United States border.

== Mission ==
The air station's missions included search and rescue, law enforcement, counting migratory waterfowl for the U.S. Biological Survey, and assisting icebound islands by delivering provisions. During World War II anti-submarine patrols were also conducted from the air station.

== History ==
With little room to expand at Coast Guard Aviation Station Ten Pound Island in Gloucester, a new air station was established at Salem in 1935. CGAS Salem was built with a barracks, hangar, a radio shack, an apron, and a seaplane ramp; it never had facilities for fixed-wing landplanes. The station was built on Winter Island, on land adjacent to the War of 1812 vintage Fort Pickering, and on or near the site of the construction of the sail frigate USS Essex by one of Enos Briggs' shipyards in 1799. The station performed 26 medevac missions in its first year of operation. During World War II anti-submarine patrols were conducted from the air station. In October 1944 the station was the first on the eastern seaboard to be designated as part of the Air-Sea Rescue Service.

In 1950, Air Detachment Quonset Point, Rhode Island was established as a sub unit of Air Station Salem. During the 1950s, helicopters were introduced with a great deal of success as a rescue platform.

With the development circa 1960 of the Sikorsky HH-52A, an amphibious helicopter, the need for flying boats was lessened. The US Navy retired its last seaplane, the P5M Marlin, in 1967. Therefore, air stations having only water landing capabilities, such as Salem, were phased out. It was replaced by Coast Guard Air Station Cape Cod in 1970, and CGAS Salem closed that year. The station's surviving facilities are part of Salem's Winter Island Marine Park, and the radio shack was converted to the office of the Salem Harbormaster Department.

== Aircraft ==
Over its history from 1935 to 1970 CGAS Salem operated numerous types of seaplanes and helicopters. Seaplanes included the Vought UO-4, General Aviation PJ-1, J4F Widgeon, Curtiss SOC-4, Grumman JRF Goose, Vought OS2U Kingfisher, Martin PBM-5, Consolidated PBY, and the Grumman HU-16 Albatross. Helicopters included the Sikorsky HO3S, HH-52A Seaguard, Piasecki HUP Army Mule, and the Piasecki HRP-1. An indoor Link Trainer was also at the air station for pilot proficiency.

== See also ==
- List of military installations in Massachusetts
