= Winter Island =

- Winter Island Historic District and Archeological District
- U.S. National Register of Historic Places
- U.S. Historic district
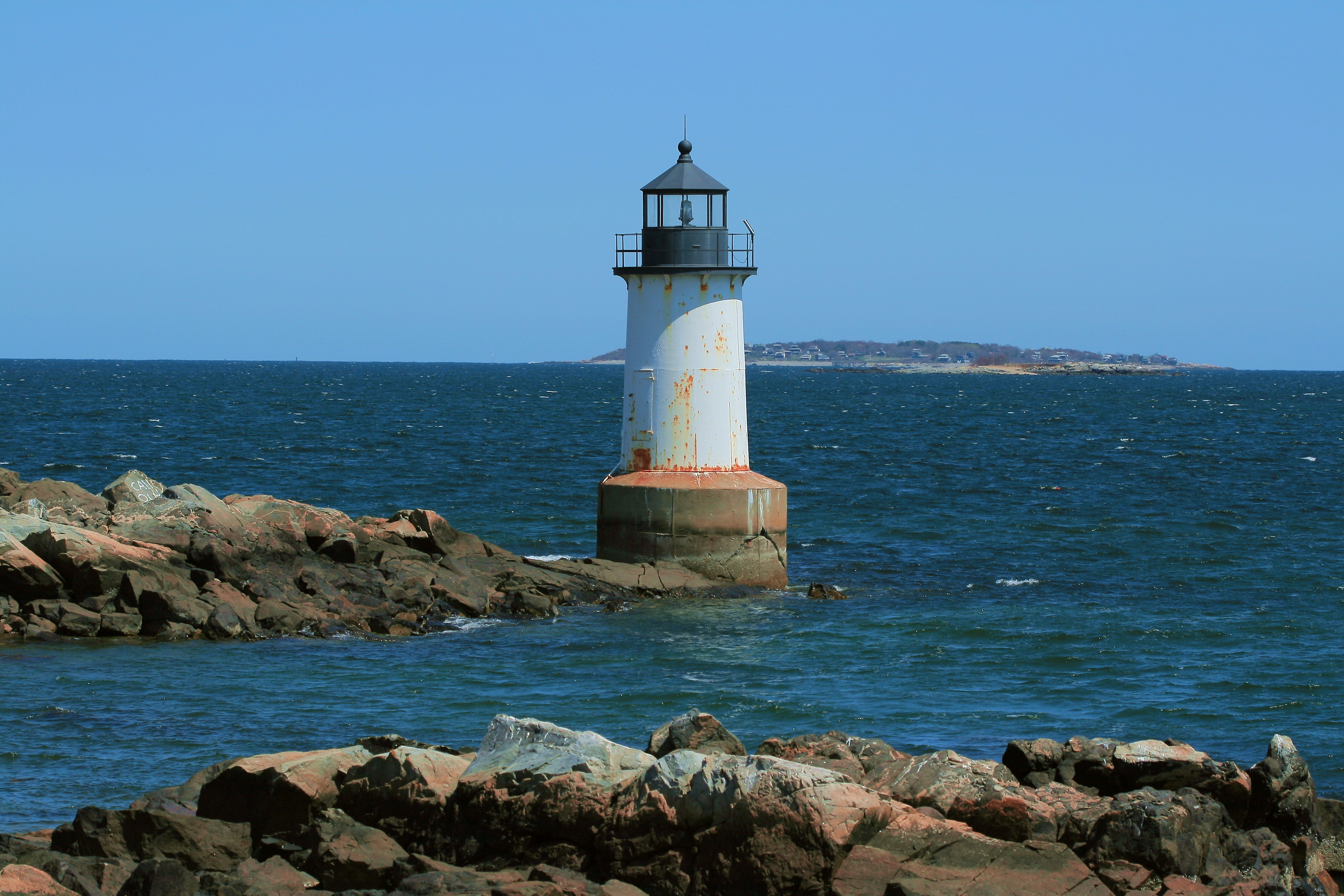
- Fort Pickering Light

- Location within Massachusetts Location within the United States
- Location: Salem, Massachusetts
- Coordinates: 42.5285°N 70.8692°W
- Area: 45 acres (18 ha)
- NRHP reference No.: 94000335
- Added to NRHP: April 14, 1994

Winter Island is an island connected by a causeway to Salem Neck in Salem, Massachusetts. It is about 45 acres (18 ha) in size, and is bounded by Smith Pool to the northwest, Cat Cove to the west, Salem Channel to the south and east, and Juniper Cove to the north. The island has about a dozen residences at the north end and one road, Winter Island Road. The Plummer Home for Boys (now Plummer Youth Promise) sits on 18 acres (7.3 ha) of land on the northeastern shore. The balance of the island is Winter Island Marine Park. The entire island was added to the National Register of Historic Places as Winter Island Historic District and Archeological District in 1994.

== Attractions ==
Winter Island Marine Park is located on the former site of the Coast Guard Air Station Salem. It's a marine recreational park open to the public. The park takes up the southern portion of the peninsula. The main attractions of the park are the historic Fort Pickering, the Fort Pickering Lighthouse, Salem Harbor, a boat launching ramp, and the former Coast Guard seaplane hangar and barracks. Fort Pickering is listed separately on the National Register of Historic Places.

In 2011, a master plan was developed for Winter Island, with help from the planning and design firm The Cecil Group of Boston and Bioengineering Group of Salem, with the City of Salem paying $45,000 in federal funds.

== History ==
Winter Island has seen use since the early settlement of Salem in the 1620s. It was first used as a fish drying and shipbuilding area by early colonial settlers, and was since the mid-17th century considered a strategic defensive point for Salem, which was by then on its way to becoming an economically important port. Fort Pickering was first built in 1643, rebuilt during Queen Anne's War and the American Revolutionary War, and continued to be fortified through the American Civil War. The frigate USS Essex was built at one of Enos Briggs' shipyards on the island in 1799. Fort Pickering Light was built in 1871, and the military use of the island was eventually transformed into a Coast Guard air station. This use was discontinued in the 20th century and the island was turned over to the city, which established Winter Island Marine Park.

== See also ==
- National Register of Historic Places listings in Salem, Massachusetts
- National Register of Historic Places listings in Essex County, Massachusetts
