= Coast Guard Air Station Cape Cod =

U.S. Coast Guard base in Sandwich, Massachusetts

- Unit Patch CGAS Cape Cod
- Active: 1970-present
- Country: United States
- Branch: United States Coast Guard
- Type: Air Station
- Role: To patrol the Northeast coast from Canada to New York City
- Garrison/HQ: Otis Air National Guard Base
- Engagements: Cold War; September 11, 2001 attacks
- Decorations: (2 stars, Operational Distinguishing Device) (4 stars) (2 stars)
- Website: Official website

Commanders
- Commanding Officer: Captain Scott E. Langum

Aircraft flown
- Helicopter: MH-60 Jayhawk
- Patrol: HC-144A Ocean Sentry

Coast Guard Air Station Cape Cod is a United States Coast Guard Air Station located at Otis Air National Guard Base in Mashpee, Massachusetts and serves the Northeast U.S. from Canada to New York. It was established in 1970.

== Missions ==
The missions of CGAS Cape Cod include search and rescue (SAR), maritime law enforcement, International Ice Patrol, aids to navigation support (such as operating lighthouses), and marine environmental protection (such as responding to oil spills). Currently, CGAS Cape Cod maintains and operates the HC-144 Ocean Sentry aircraft, along with HH-60 Jayhawk helicopters. CGAS Cape Cod is located in part within the town of Sandwich, Massachusetts.

== History ==
=== Beginnings ===
In the 1950s, helicopters began to be incorporated into the United States Coast Guard. One such helicopter, the H-25A Army Mule was built with amphibious capabilities. Float planes were no longer needed because of this development. Therefore, places like Coast Guard Air Station Salem were slowly being phased out. In the 1960s, the Coast Guard began searching for a replacement facility for Coast Guard Air Station Salem, that was in service from 1935 to 1970. Salem was not able to expand, and the Coast Guard needed a space that could grow as needed and accommodate modern aircraft.

=== 1970–1980 ===
In 1968, the Department of Defense agreed to allow the Coast Guard to utilize Otis Air Force Base on Cape Cod for a new Coast Guard air station. Air Station Cape Cod was officially established/commissioned on August 29, 1970. The HH-3F Pelicans and HU-16E Albatrosses were transferred from CGAS Salem and CGAD Quonset Point Rhode Island (NAS) to Cape Cod in the summer of 1970.

==== Crash of Helo CG-1432 ====
The CG-1432 crash was a United States Coast Guard aviation accident which involved five crewmembers aboard a helicopter responding to a distress call from the Japanese fishing vessel Kaisei Maru #18.

On the morning of February 18, 1979, Kaisei Maru #18 sent a distress call. The call indicated that a 47-year-old crewmember was in distress and needed to be airlifted off the ship, which was operating in the North Atlantic Ocean. The U.S. Coast Guard Sikorsky HH-3F Pelican helicopter CG-1432 from Coast Guard Air Station Cape Cod was alerted and sent out to the vessel.

The weather that morning was stormy and conditions were not ideal for flight. On the way to Kasei Maru #18, the helicopter (which was designed to be amphibious) was forced to ditch into the sea after losing power. It remained stable for a brief time before the heavy seas flipped it. This most likely caused the death of four crew members: Canadian Armed Forces Captain G. Richard Burge (exchange copilot), and U.S. Coast Guard personnel Lieutenant Commander James Stiles (Aircraft Commander), Petty Officer Second Class John Tait (Avionicsman/Navigator), and Petty Officer Second Class Bruce Kaehler (Hospital Corpsman). The lone survivor, Petty Officer Second Class Mark Torr (Flight Mechanic/Hoist Operator), remembers the flipping of the helicopter and swimming out, holding onto the nose wheel to stay near the aircraft.

The first vessel to the rescue was Kaisei Maru #18, which rescued Torr and circled the ditched helicopter for 15 hours, looking for survivors and eventually recovering the bodies of the four dead crewmembers.

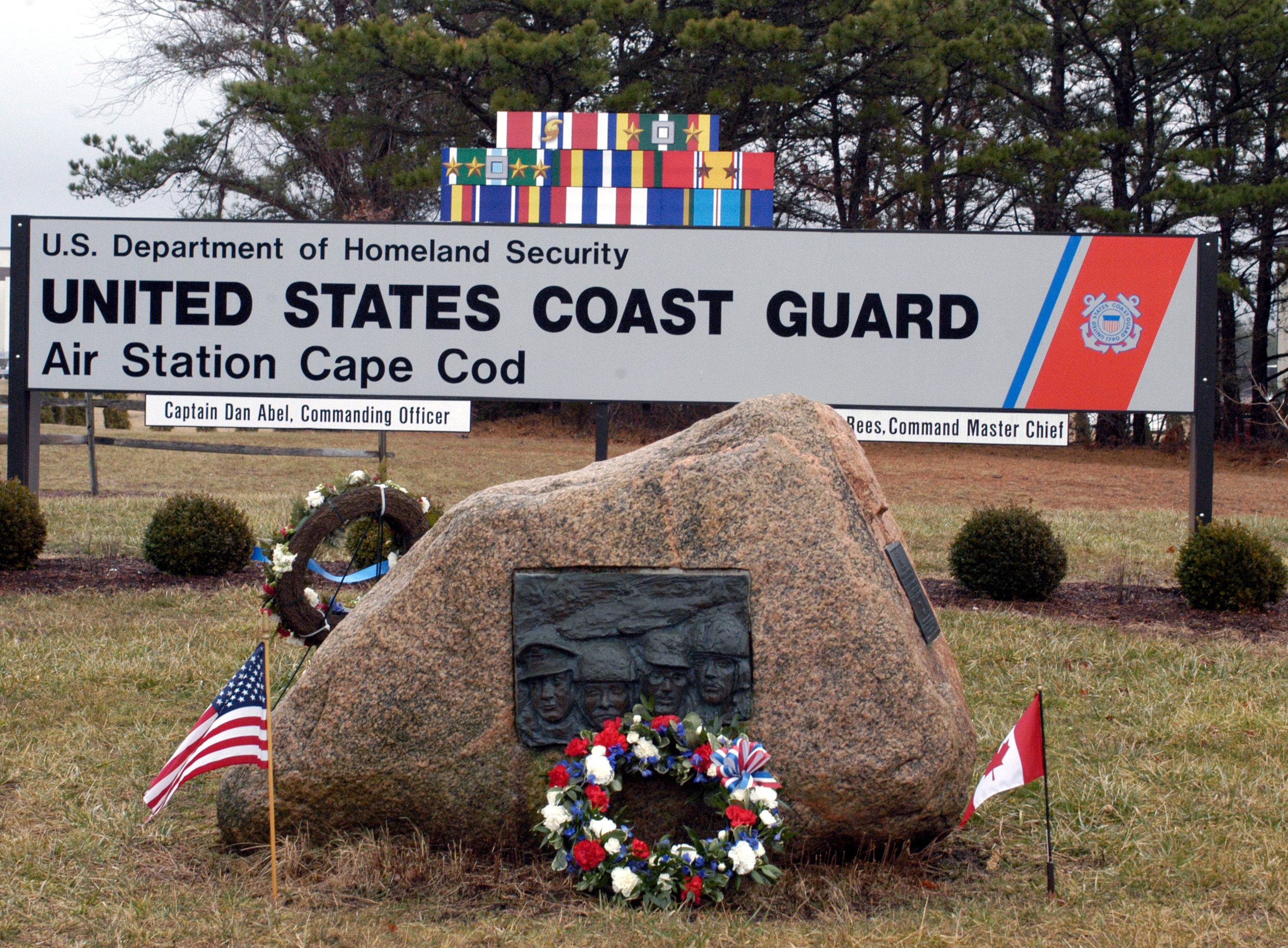
A memorial to the fallen sits at the entrance to CGAS Cape Cod

In an article in the Cape Cod Times that ran on February 22, 1979, the air station's commanding officer, Captain Arthur Wagner, said, "They will never be forgotten. They set down a high standard for all of us to follow." A legacy was set in which a reunion would be held every year so that the men would not be forgotten.

A memorial was erected in 1980 at the entrance to Coast Guard Air Station Cape Cod.

At the 2009 reunion, Rear Admiral John Currier, who was stationed at Coast Guard Air Station Cape Cod in 1979, recalled telling pilot James Stiles to "fly safe." It was the last time that he ever said that to a pilot. Also at service, crash survivor Mark Torr dropped a wreath in memory of his fellow airmen from a hovering helicopter into the surf off Cape Cod, Massachusetts.

=== 1980-1995 ===
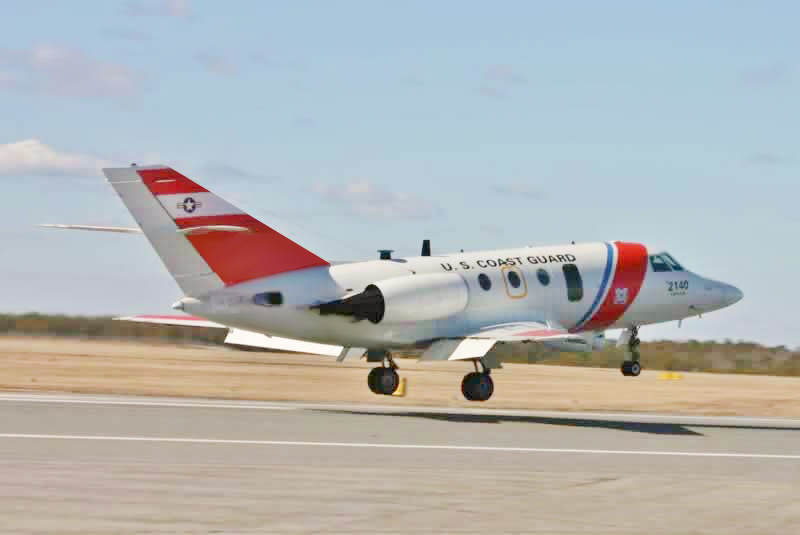
A HU-25 lands at Otis

The HH-3F Pelican continued in service until replaced by the HH-60 Jayhawk in the 90s The last HH-52A Seaguard helicopters were transferred from CGAD Salem to CGAS Cape Cod in late 1970 and were phased out prior to the Jayhawk coming on board. The HU-25 Guardians arrived at CGAS Cape Cod, in 1982, replacing the HU-16E Albatross. The last Albatross, CGNR 7250, was retired on March 10, 1983 and is on display outside the entrance to the air station. CG 7250/NC 7250 was not only the last Coast Guard Albatross, but the last fixed-wing amphibious aircraft in U.S. inventory.

=== 1995–present ===
The air station has participated in rescues of sailors from Canada to New York. The Coast Guard has replaced the HU-25 with the HC-144 Ocean Sentry.

== Notable persons ==
- Daniel C. Burbank - former helicopter pilot, now a NASA astronaut

== See also ==
- List of military installations in Massachusetts
