= Salem Channel =

Coordinates: 42°32′38.4″N 70°50′27.2″W

Salem Channel is the main channel in the Salem Sound that stretches from Winter Island in the city of Salem to Misery Shoal in the city limits of Beverly. It is a dangerous harbor hazard because it is shallow, leading to many shipwrecks and mayday calls. In addition, many ledges and rocks stick out from the water.
