= Enos Briggs =

American shipbuilder (1746–1819)

- Born: July 20, 1746; Pembroke, Massachusetts
- Died: 1819 (aged 72–73); Salem, Massachusetts
- Occupation: shipbuilder

Enos Briggs (1746–1819) was an American shipbuilder.

== Life ==
He was born on July 20, 1746, in Pembroke, Massachusetts.

He was the son of Seth Briggs, another shipbuilder.

He died in Salem, Massachusetts in 1819.

== Career ==
He is most famous for being the builder of the warship USS Essex on Winter Island in Salem, which was captured by the British in the War of 1812.

Other notable ships built by him include the Grand Turk and the Friendship.

Some of his well-known customers were Elias Derby, Joseph Peabody, Simon Forrester and George Crowninshield.

== Legacy ==
Shipbuilder and merchant Thatcher Magoun worked for Enos Briggs for five years as a young man.
