= Fort Lee (Salem, Massachusetts) =

Coordinates: 42°31′55″N 70°52′28″W

- U.S. National Register of Historic Places
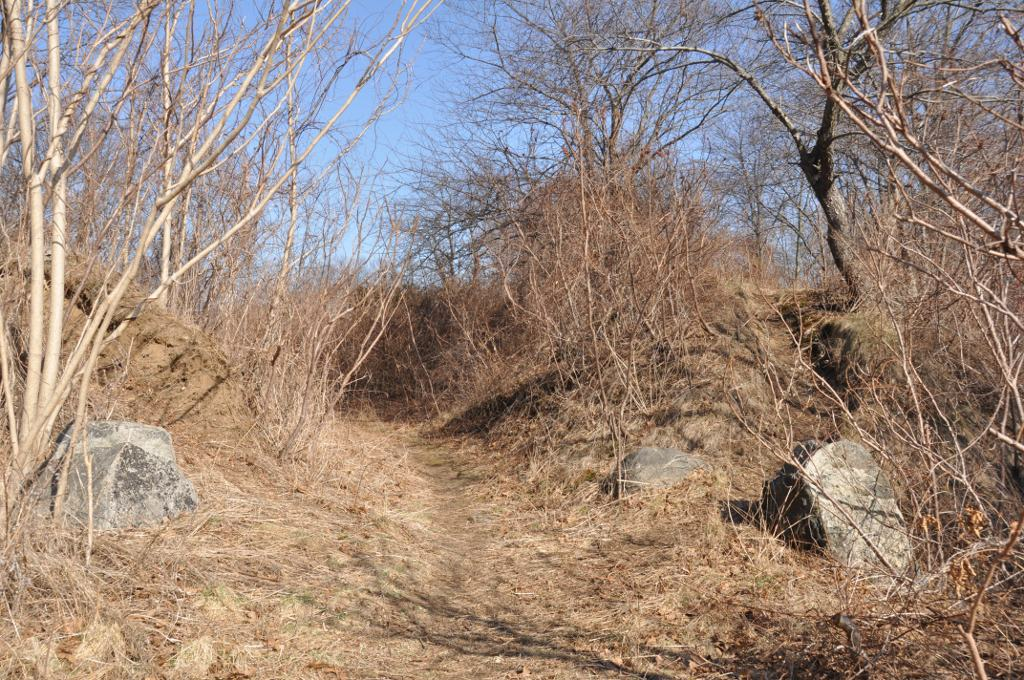
- Overgrown earthworks of the fort

- Location within Massachusetts Location within the United States
- Nearest city: Salem, Massachusetts
- Built: 1776
- NRHP reference No.: 94000285
- Added to NRHP: April 14, 1994

Fort Lee is a historic American Revolutionary War fort in Salem, Massachusetts. The site, located at a high point next to Fort Avenue on Salem Neck, is a relatively rare fortification from that period whose remains are relatively unaltered. It is an irregular 5-pointed star fort. Although there is some documentary evidence that the Neck was fortified as early as the 17th century, the earthworks built in 1776 are the first clear evidence of the site's military use. Reportedly, the fort had a garrison of 3 officers and 100 artillerymen with 16 guns. The site, of which only overgrown earthworks and a stone magazine survive, was repaired in the 1790s, and rebuilt for the American Civil War. A state cultural resource document states that the fort has not been much modified since the Revolution, and has not been built over. It was garrisoned by the Massachusetts militia in the War of 1812, abandoned afterwards, and rebuilt with four 8-inch columbiads in the Civil War. An Army engineer drawing dated 1872 depicts the fort's five-pointed trace and the four Civil War gun positions. It was also garrisoned during the Spanish–American War.

The property was federalized in 1867, and transferred to the City of Salem in 1922. The site was briefly rehabilitated at the time of the United States bicentennial in 1976, with trails and interpretive signs, but these were later removed, and the site has again become overgrown. Earthworks and a stone magazine remain. The fort site was listed on the National Register of Historic Places in 1994.

== See also ==
- Fort Pickering
- National Register of Historic Places listings in Salem, Massachusetts
- National Register of Historic Places listings in Essex County, Massachusetts
- List of military installations in Massachusetts
