= Salem Willows =

Oceanfront park in Salem, Massachusetts

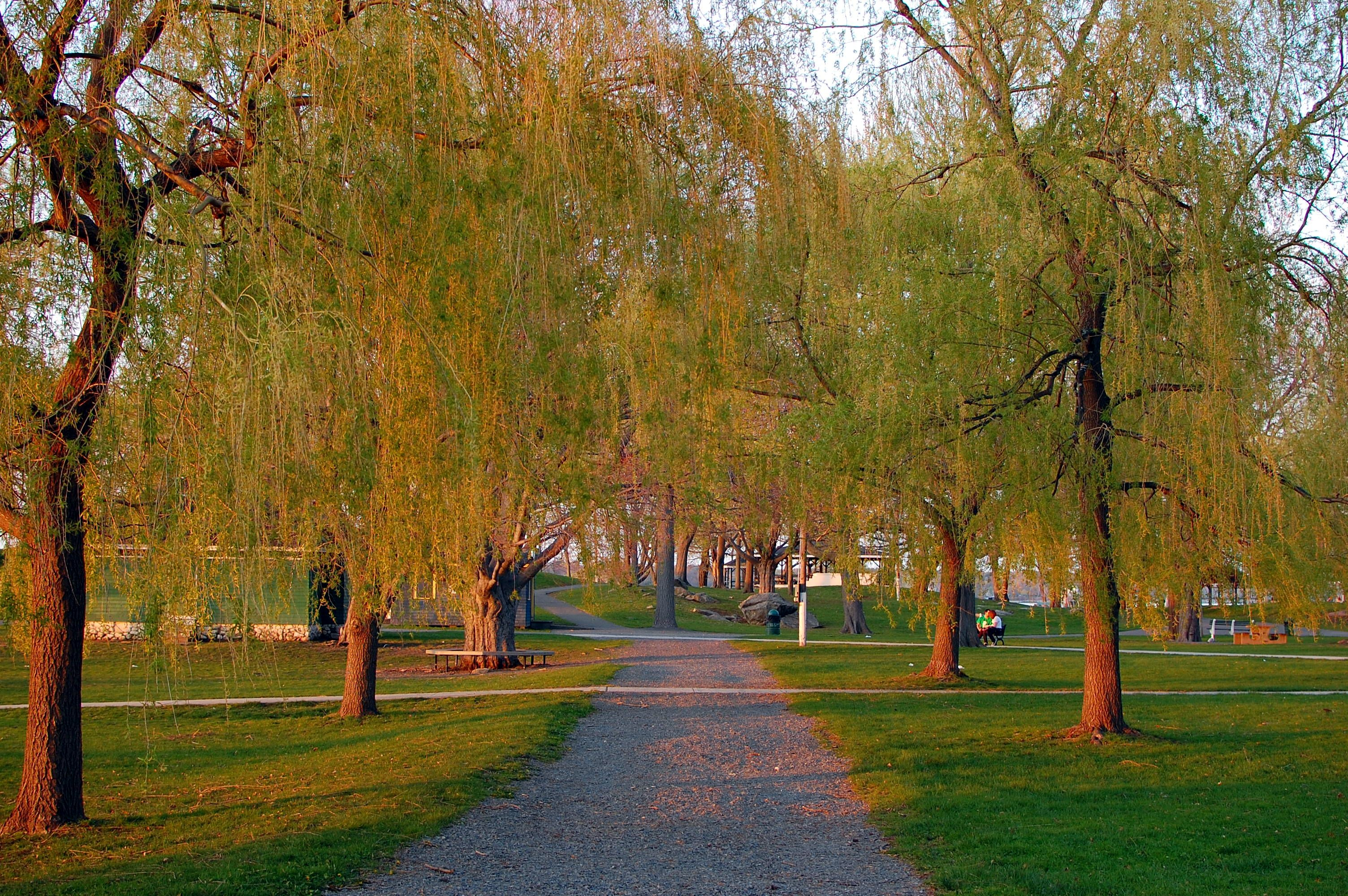
- A path at the Salem Willows featuring Willow trees
- Interactive map of Salem Willows
- Type: Urban park
- Location: Salem, Massachusetts, United States
- Coordinates: 42°32′6″N 70°52′10″W
- Area: 35 acres (0.14 km^{2}; 0.055 mi^{2})
- Created: 1858
- Owner: Salem, MA
- Operator: Salem Park, Recreation & Community Services Department

Salem Willows is an oceanfront park in Salem, Massachusetts. It is named for the European white willow trees planted there in 1801 to form a shaded walk for patients convalescing at a nearby smallpox hospital. The area became a public park in 1858, and became a summer destination for residents of Boston's North Shore, many of whom escaped the heat of the city on newly popular streetcars. Construction on the amusement park began in the summer of 1877 by the Naumkeag Street Railway Company which had extended its horsecar system to the park. On June 10, 1880 the park opened with many amusement park additions. By 1911, electric streetcar service had been increased to include two tracks from Derby Street along Fort Ave. to the end of the line at what is now the parking lot at the arcade.

The park covers over 35 acres and includes beaches, a pier, a yacht club, and a boardwalk with an arcade as well as take-out restaurants. There are many areas for recreational activities including social gatherings and picnicking. There are gazebos, a small stage area, and tennis and basketball courts. There is an amusement park called Kiddieland with a carousel that survives to this day with a few other rides that are for children only, as well as a miniature golf course. There are two small beaches located on the Willows which is a common place for tourists to go and see the surrounding cities and towns. The beaches are also a common place to watch the 4th of July fireworks since you can see three sets of fireworks; Salem, Beverly, and Marblehead. The Salem Trolley stops at the park.

Many establishments on Restaurant Row, the park's north side, served fresh seafood, while a carousel with carved flying horses was another special attraction. The park is near the Juniper Point neighborhood, most likely named for its juniper trees. Many of the houses there were originally occupied only during the summer, but they are now year round homes."

In 2012, then mayor Kim Driscoll first petitioned the state to have the park's historic fishing pier — originally permitted in 1894 — rebuilt. After many years in the making, the new pier was constructed, and opened on November 3rd, 2024, with an official ribbon-cutting ceremony later taking place on December 2nd of that same year.

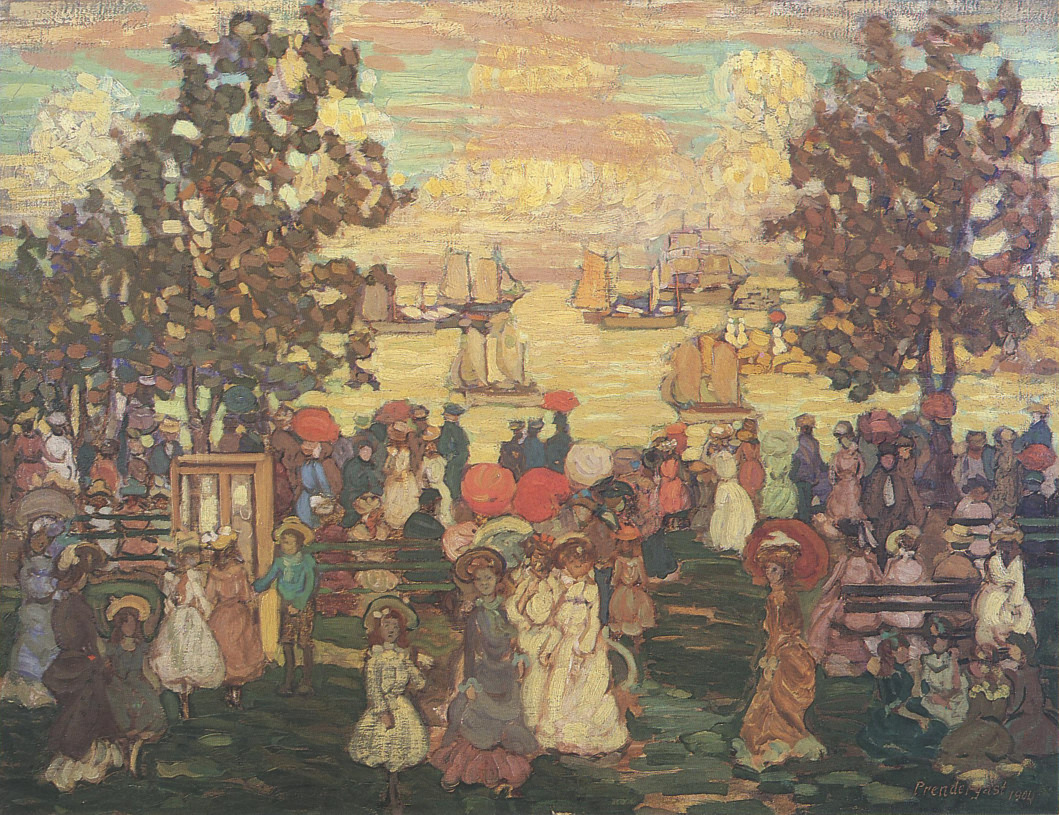
Artist Maurice Prendergast drew inspiration from the scenic Salem Willows Park for his 1904 painting "Salem Willows".

== Negro Election Day ==
Negro Election Day, formerly called, Salem Black Picnic Day, (until 2019) and the “Colored People’s Picnic” (until 1968), "Church Picnic" and "Sunday Picnic" is a celebration of historical significance; "The First Black Voting System" and in 2022, it will celebrate its 282nd anniversary. Salem was one of a few Massachusetts towns in which Black people voted to elect a Black Governor who would serve as a judge, mediator, and liaison for the Black community. Negro Election Day's first celebration was in 1741 and its first elected King/Governor was Black King Pompey. He resided in Lynn on the Saugus River, which eventually became the Town of Saugus. 26 enslaved people gathering to present Black King Pompey and celebrate this daylong coronation.

Negro Election Day moved to Salem Willows around 1858, today it occurs on the third Saturday of July. In 2019 Senators Joan Lovely and Bruce Tarr sponsored a bill to establish the third Saturday in July as Negro Election Day. The Bill passed favorable in the House and the Senate In March, 2022. Since World War II, the celebration has been held on a Saturday since that was the only time many African Americans who worked in factories had time to celebrate. The activities of Negro Election Day was cancelled during the COVID-19 pandemic in 2020 and returned in 2022.

The overarching theme of the day is to Black History Matters. The celebration consists of a families barbecuing and eating together, a parade, vendors, free entertainment, Community speeches and awards, music, dancing, sporting contests, and voter registration. Attendance ranges from 2,500 to 5,000 people. Popular food at the event include spare ribs, collard greens, and potato salad. One year the National Park Service supplied an Election Day Cake, made by Ziggy & Sons’ Donuts in Salem from an 18th-century recipe.

Negro Election Day was practiced during the War of 1812 to protect Black POW's from the hardship and cruelty practiced at Dartmoor Prison, Great Britain. The most famous Black King during that time period was called Black King Dick. When the POW's were freed in 1815, he was released and returned to Massachusetts becoming an auxiliary Police Office in Boston.

In recent years there has been more interest in the history of this event. Some historic documents that mention the event include:

- Benjamin Lynde (Salem attorney) diary from 1741, which states “Election; Negro’s hallowday here at Salem.”
- "Diary of William Bentley" (Salem minister) from 1817

Since 2015 the Salem United, Inc, led by Doreen Wade, has organized the event. The Salem United Board came together, to maintain the historic importance of the Negro Election Day. Also in 2015 Governor Charlie Baker signed a decree recognizing the Black Picnic as a historical event.

== Events and Music ==
The Willows provides a conducive outdoor location for many annual and special events. Some of these special events include fireworks displays, parades, and music and theater programs.

=== Willows Casino and Charleshurst Ballroom ===
The Charleshurst Ballroom opened in the 1920s. It was the base of operations for owner Charlie Schribman, who operated many ballrooms throughout New England. Schribman handled bookings for Duke Ellington and other bands which led to Ellington playing at the Charleshurst Ballroom nine times during the summer of 1927.

=== Salem Jazz and Soul Festival ===
Salem residents, Henley Douglas Jr. and Jonathan and Jennifer Reardon, started discussing a concert series in 2003. By 2006 they had a board of directors and a group of area musicians behind the idea. The first Salem Jazz and Soul Festival (SJSF) was held in on April 21, 2007. The year after it was held in August as it has since.

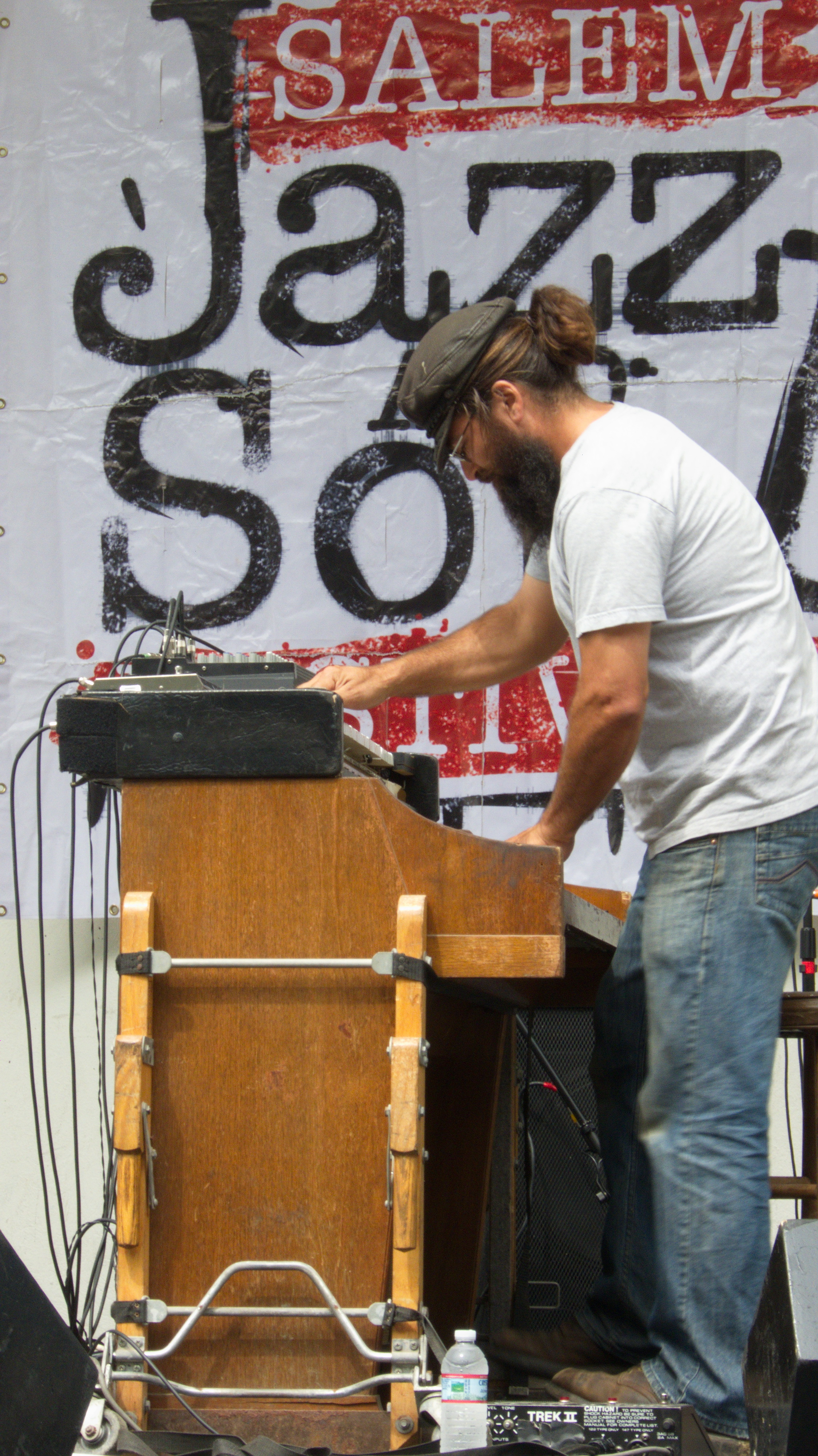
Salem Jazz and Soul Festival 2012

=== The Robert F. Hayes Band Stand ===
Robert "Bob" Hayes was 92 when the band stand was renamed for him. From the plaque, "For his commitment to perpetuating free concerts for several generations of Salem residents. Since 1939, the only concert seasons he missed were during World War II while serving in the U.S. Navy. Assigned to the USS Essex, musician 2nd class "Bob" Hayes performed ceremonial music and entertained his shipmates daily while patrolling the South Pacific. He was also engaged in combat during damage control during several 'kamikaze' attacks. This bandstand is dedicated in his honor this day, June 25, 2013, by his family, fellow North Shore concert band musicians and the Salem Veterans Council."

=== Horribles Parade ===
The Horribles Parade happens July 4th and is organized by residents from the Juniper Point neighborhood which adjoins Willow Park. This tradition has been happening since the late 1940s and also happens in other Massachusetts towns such as Needham, Danvers, Beverly, Peabody, and Gloucester. The theme of the parade is a mix of patriotism and parody.

== Food and Restaurants ==
Multiple restaurants have had their place at the Willows. The Chase Willow House opened in 1874 and was one of the most famous. It burned down quickly around midnight on July 15, 1952. Other restaurants that existed in the past were Ebsen's, Downing's seafood restaurant, Swenbeck's, and “Blind Pat” Kenneally's double-jointed peanut stand.

Today there are fewer food options, but Hobbs' popcorn and ice cream stand is open seasonally and is known for their homemade ice cream and popcorn. Everett Hobbs and Wilbur Eaton sold popcorn at the Willows in the mid 1880s and bought a building to set up shop in 1897. Today the fourth generation of Hobbs' continue the tradition.

=== Salem Lowe and the Chop Suey sandwich ===
The Salem Lowe Co. restaurant can be dated back to at least 1912 and was originally located at 228 Essex Street in downtown Salem. It was originally a sit down restaurant serving Chinese and American food, which were separated on the menu.
