= Fort Pickering =

- U.S. National Register of Historic Places
- U.S. Historic district – Contributing property
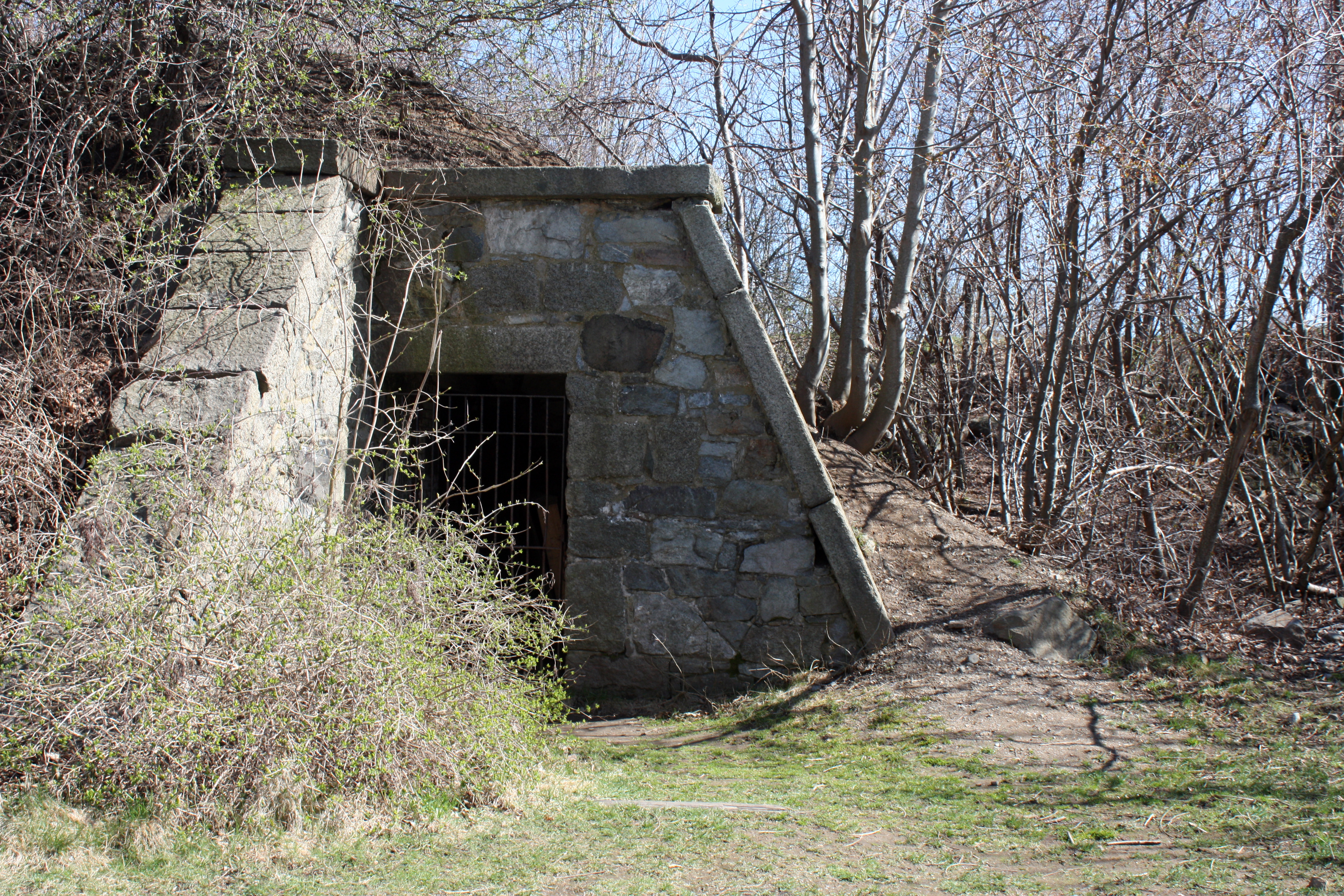

- Location within Massachusetts Location within the United States
- Location: Winter Island, Salem, Massachusetts
- Coordinates: 42°31′37″N 70°52′2″W
- Area: 2 acres (0.81 ha)
- Built: 1643
- Part of: Winter Island Historic District and Archeological District
- NRHP reference No.: 73000320
- Added to NRHP: February 8, 1973

Fort Pickering is a 17th-century historic fort site on Winter Island in Salem, Massachusetts. Fort Pickering operated as a strategic coastal defense and military barracks for Salem Harbor during a variety of periods, serving as a fortification from the Anglo-Dutch Wars through World War II. Construction of the original fort began in 1643 and it saw use as a military installation into the 20th century. Fort Miller (Fort Darby prior to the Civil War) in Marblehead also defended Salem's harbor from the 1630s through the American Civil War. Fort Pickering is a First System fortification named for Colonel Timothy Pickering, born in Salem, adjutant general of the Continental Army and secretary of war in 1795. Today, the remains of the fort are open to the public as part of the Winter Island Maritime Park, operated by the City of Salem.

== 17th century ==
Winter Island at the time of English settlement in the early 17th century was an island separated from the mainland, held as common land by the Proprietors and used as a fortification and for fishing activities. In 1643 Fort William was begun on the island.

== 18th century ==
Circa 1702, during Queen Anne's War, Fort William was renamed Fort Anne (for then Queen Anne), and was rebuilt around 1706 under the direction of the Royal Engineers, who were earlier sent by King William III to fortify the colonies. It is unclear how much was accomplished, as a debate on whether the town or the province should fund the rebuilding lasted past 1711, when the war ended for the American colonies. In 1735 the Massachusetts General Court provided 600 pounds to rebuild the fort to hold 15 guns. It was rebuilt again by the town and known as Fort Number Two in Patriot hands during the American Revolutionary War.

In 1794, the City of Salem ceded the fort to the federal government and a new fort was constructed in its place, part of the first system of U.S. fortifications. The 1794 U.S. Army report on fortifications called for the fort to have eight artillery pieces, a blockhouse, and a magazine. The fort's garrison was proposed to consist of one officer and 22 enlisted men.

Major repairs to the fort were conducted in 1796 and a restoration in 1799. Later in 1799 it was renamed Fort Pickering in honor of Timothy Pickering, then Secretary of State of the U.S.

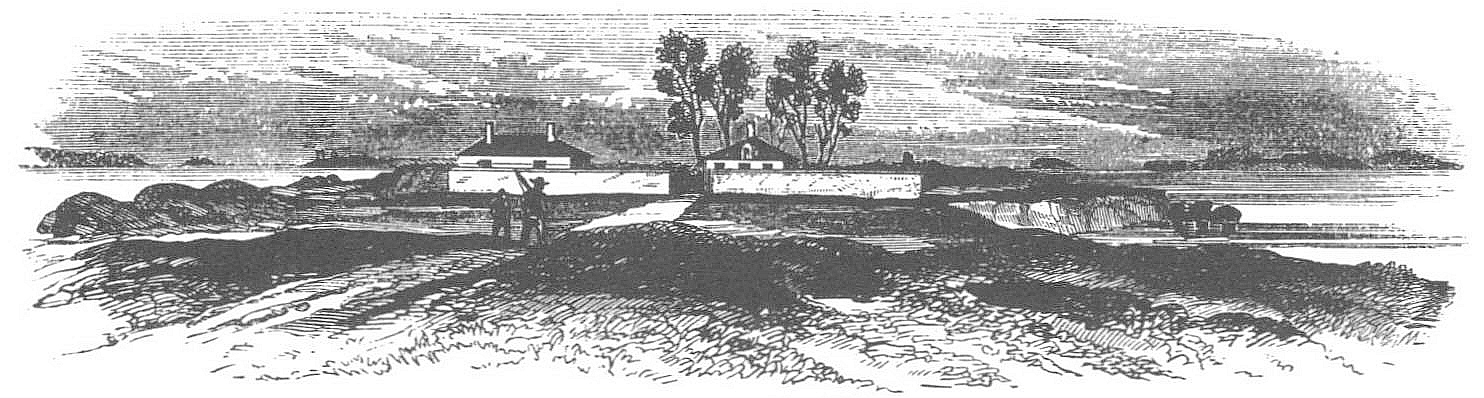
Hand-drawn picture of Fort Pickering from the Pictorial Fieldbook of the War of 1812 by Benson Lossing (1869)

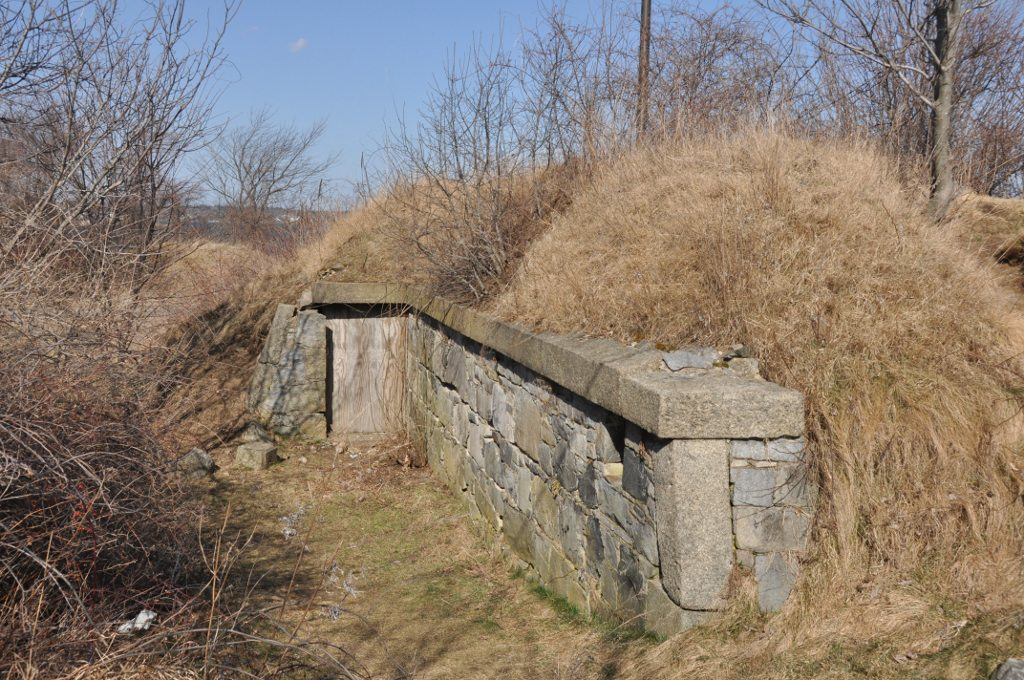
One of three 19th-century ammunition bunkers

== 19th century ==
The fort was rebuilt in 1800 and 1808 to mount six guns as part of the second system of U.S. fortifications. In a report on the conditions of fortifications of the United States submitted to Congress by President Jefferson on January 6, 1809, the following is stated regarding Fort Pickering - "The fort and block house, ... with a magazine under it, have been repaired and a new barrack erected." Another report in December 1811 stated the fort was "an enclosed work of brick and sods, mounting six heavy guns, covered by a block house".

Regular Army commanders of the fort (combined with Fort Sewall in Marblehead) from 1800 to 1812 included Capt. Alexander D. Pope 1800–1802, a detachment of Capt. Nehemiah Freeman's company 1802–1803, no federal garrison 1804–1808, and Capt. Stephen Ranney 1809–1812.

Massachusetts militia camps on Winter Island in the 1850s and 1860s included Camp Sutton (1853, 1855), Camp Edmunds (1856), Camp Banks (1858), and Camp Gardner (1860s). Camp Sutton existed in 1853 and 1855. The camp was named for general William Sutton and was occupied by the 2nd Division. Camp Edmunds existed in 1856. The camp was named for Major General B.F. Edmunds and was occupied by the 4th Brigade. Camp Banks existed in 1858. The camp was named for Major General Nathaniel P. Banks and was occupied by the 2nd Division.

The fort received another military restoration in the War of 1812. In 1820 it had a capacity of 11 guns. During the 19th century, the island was used primarily for fortification and in 1864 the City of Salem again ceded the island to the federal government in support of the Civil War efforts. Although the capacity remained at 11 guns, the area of the fort was increased, with earthwork parapets built outside the stone fort and gun embrasures added for improved protection. The magazine was also increased in size. To defend against land attack, the gorge at the rear of the fort was guarded by two curtain walls and a wet moat. The walls were part of a bombproof shelter with loopholes for small arms. Facilities outside the fort included a guard house, hospital/commissary, barracks/mess hall, stable, sink, and well. An armament report by Major Charles E. Blunt dated January 31, 1865 shows the fort had six 24-pounder smoothbore guns, three 32-pounder rifles, and two 24-pounder rifles. It was also called Salem Barracks in that war. From May 1864 to June 1865 Fort Pickering was garrisoned successively by the 3rd and 17th Unattached Companies Massachusetts Volunteer Militia.

== 20th century ==
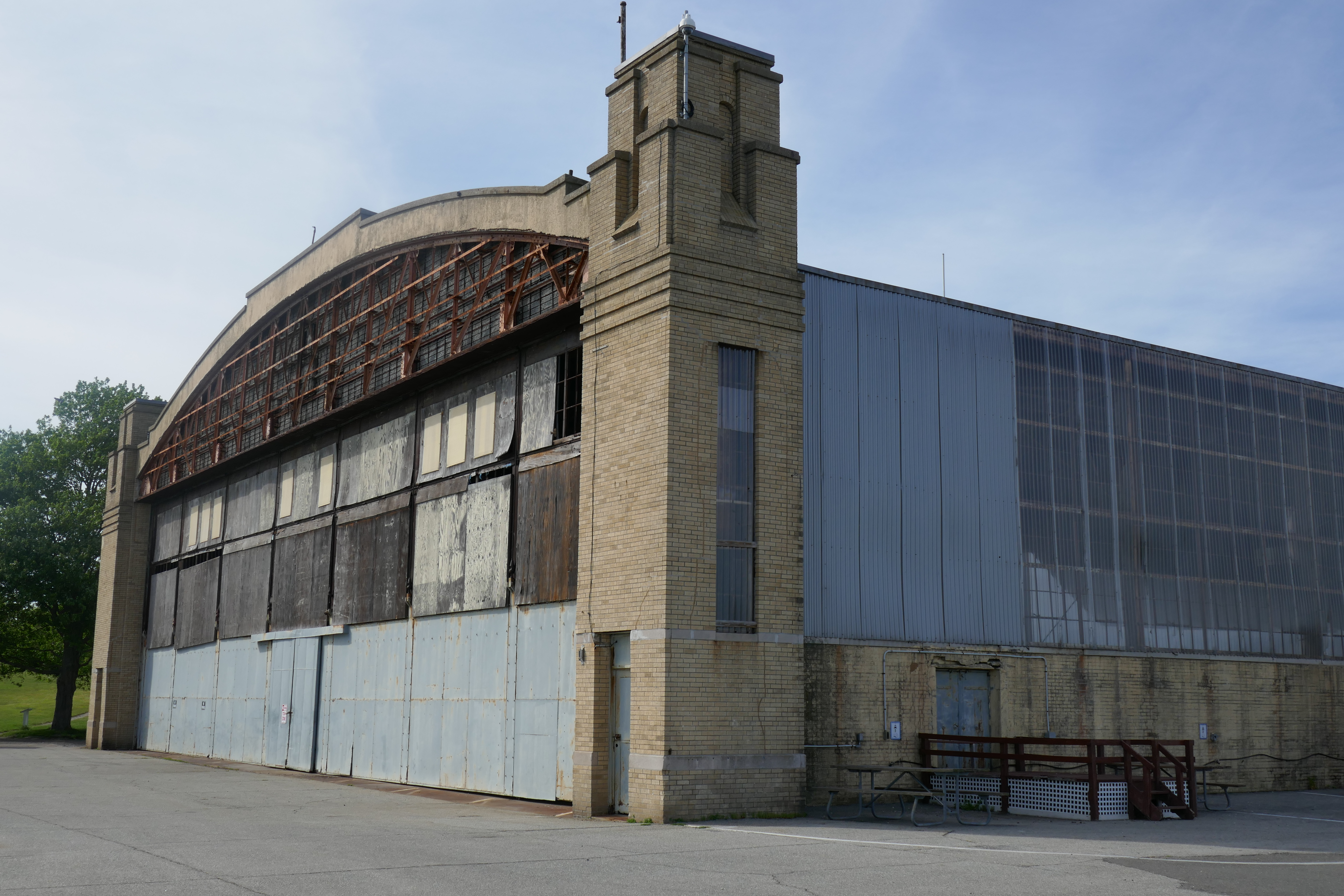
Abandoned seaplane hangar at former Fort Pickering, 2016

In 1935 most of the land on Winter Island became the newly established Coast Guard Air Station Salem. The air station had a hangar and ramp for seaplanes. Aircraft from the station conducted anti-submarine patrols during World War II and search and rescue missions until it was closed in 1971.

The site was added to the National Register of Historic Places in 1973. In 1994, the National Register designated the entire collection of cultural resources at Winter Island and Fort Pickering as the Winter Island Historic District and Archaeological District. Portions of the Civil War fort remain.

== See also ==
- Fort Lee (Salem, Massachusetts)
- Seacoast defense in the United States
- List of coastal fortifications of the United States
- National Register of Historic Places listings in Salem, Massachusetts
- National Register of Historic Places listings in Essex County, Massachusetts
- List of military installations in Massachusetts
