= Salem Neck (Massachusetts) =

Coordinates: 42°31′50″N 70°52′28″W

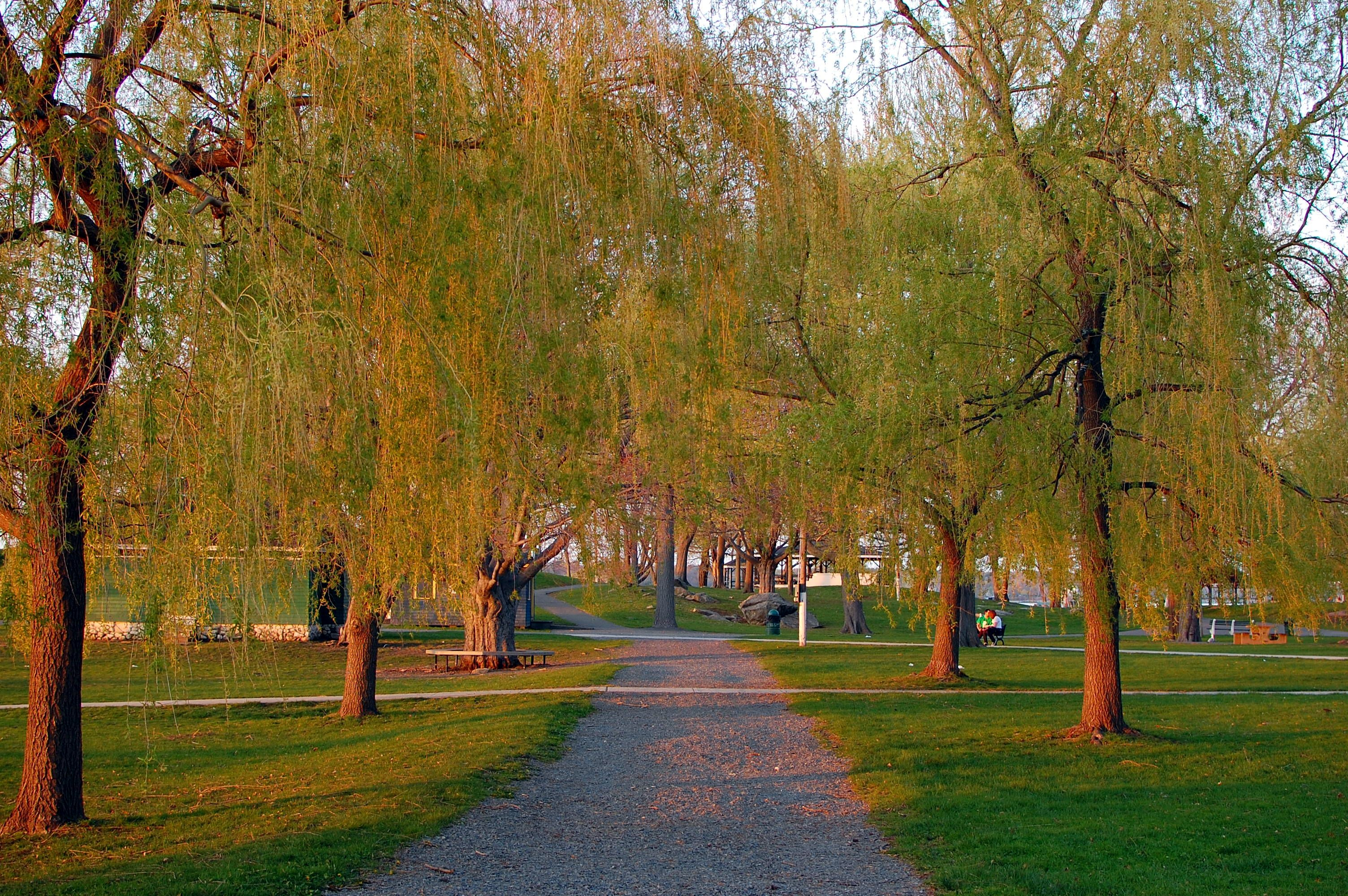
Salem Willows Park

Salem Neck is a peninsula in northeastern Salem, Massachusetts, in the United States. It stretches from Salem's powerplant on Salem Harbor to Juniper Point on Salem Neck. The peninsula is populated primarily by residential and recreational areas. Winter Island is an island connected to its mid-western coast by a causeway.
