= Salem =

Salem may refer to:

== Places ==
=== Canada ===
- Salem, Ontario (disambiguation), various places

=== Germany ===
- Salem, Baden-Württemberg, a municipality in the Bodensee district
  - Salem Abbey (Reichskloster Salem), a monastery
- Salem, Schleswig-Holstein

=== Israel ===
- Salem, Ma'ale Iron
- Salem (Bible), an ancient town mentioned in the Bible

=== India ===
- Salem, Tamil Nadu
  - Salem City Municipal Corporation
  - Salem metropolitan area (India)
  - Salem district, Tamil Nadu
  - Salem railway division
- Salem (Lok Sabha constituency), a parliamentary constituency in Tamil Nadu

=== Palestine ===
- Salim, Nablus, or Salem

=== Sweden ===
- Salem Municipality, a municipality in Stockholm County
  - Salem, Sweden, the seat of Salem Municipality

=== United Kingdom ===
- Salem, Cornwall, England
- Salem, an area of Oldham, England
- Salem, Ceredigion, Wales
- Salem, village near Llandeilo, Wales

=== United States ===
- Salem, Alabama
- Salem, Fulton County, Arkansas, a city
- Salem, Saline County, Arkansas, a census-designated place
- Salem, Connecticut
- Salem, Florida
- Salem, Georgia, in Upson County
- Salem, Oconee County, Georgia
- Salem, Illinois
- Salem, Indiana, county seat of Washington County
- Salem, Adams County, Indiana, unincorporated place
- Salem, Jay County, Indiana, unincorporated place
- Salem, Union County, Indiana, unincorporated place
- Salem, Iowa
- Salem, Kentucky
- Salem, Massachusetts, where the 1692 witch trials were held
  - Salem Harbor
  - Salem Channel, a part of the Salem Sound
- Salem Township, Allegan County, Michigan
- Salem Township, Washtenaw County, Michigan
  - Salem, Michigan, an unincorporated community
- Salem, Missouri, county seat of Dent County
- Salem, Lewis County, Missouri
- Salem, Nebraska
- Salem, New Hampshire
- Salem County, New Jersey
  - Salem, New Jersey, county seat of Salem County
  - Salem Nuclear Power Plant
  - Salem River, a tributary of the Delaware River
  - Port of Salem
- Salem, New Mexico
- Salem, New York, town in Washington County
  - Salem (hamlet), New York, within the town of Salem
- Salem, an earlier name of Brocton, New York, in Chautauqua County
- Salem, North Carolina, census-designated place in Burke County
- Winston-Salem, North Carolina, in Forsyth County formed from merger of Salem and Winston
- Salem, Ohio
- Salem, Oklahoma
- Salem, Oregon, the state capital and largest U.S. city named Salem
  - Salem Metropolitan Statistical Area, consisting of Marion and Polk counties
- Salem, South Carolina, in Oconee County
- Salem, South Dakota, county seat of McCook County
- Salem, Tennessee, an unincorporated community
- Salem, Cherokee County, Texas, an unincorporated community
- Salem, Smith County, Texas, an unincorporated community
- Salem, Utah, a city
- Salem, Virginia, an independent city
- Salem, Virginia Beach, Virginia, a neighborhood
- Salem, West Virginia, a city in Harrison County
- Salem, Fayette County, West Virginia, an unincorporated community
- Salem, Wisconsin (disambiguation), several places
- Salem Township (disambiguation)

=== Elsewhere ===
- Salem, Brebes, a subdistrict in Central Java, Indonesia
- Salem, Myanmar
- Salem, Montserrat
- Salem, Eastern Cape, South Africa
- Salem, Valencia, Spain

== Arts, entertainment, and media ==
=== Fictional characters ===
- Salem, the main antagonist from the web series RWBY
- Salem Saberhagen, a cat in the comic book and television series Sabrina, the Teenage Witch
- Salem Vishnu, Indian film character played by Thiagarajan in New Delhi and Salem Vishnu

=== Music ===
- Salem (American band), an electronic music band
- Salem (British rock band)
- Salem (British punk band)
- Salem (Israeli band), an extreme metal band
- Salem (record label), a 1960s New Zealand music publisher

=== Television ===
- Salem (Days of Our Lives), the setting of the American soap opera Days of our Lives
- Salem (TV series), a 2014 horror drama

=== Other uses in arts, entertainment, and media ===
- Salem (comics) or Salem: Queen of Thorns, US, 2008
- Salem (video game), a Java-based MMORPG
- Town of Salem (video game), a social deduction game
- Salem (painting), 1908, by Sydney Curnow Vosper
- Salem Weekly, an alternative newspaper, Oregon

== Brands and enterprises ==
- Salem (cigarette), an American brand
- Salem Media Group, an American Christian-based radio broadcaster, internet content provider, and publisher

== Educational institutions ==
- Salem Academy, North Carolina
- Salem College, North Carolina
- Salem High School (disambiguation), several in the US
- Salem State University, Massachusetts
- Salem University, West Virginia
- Schule Schloss Salem (Salem Castle School or Salem College), Germany

== Mathematics ==
- Salem number, a real algebraic integer with certain properties
- Salem Prize, an award for young mathematicians

== Religious institutions ==
- Salem Chapel (disambiguation), several chapels worldwide
- Salem International, a German Christian charity
- Salem Methodist Church Complex (Cincinnati, Ohio)
- South Asian Lutheran Evangelical Mission, a church organization in Hong Kong

== Sports ==
- Salem RidgeYaks, a minor league baseball team in Salem, Virginia
- Salem Soldiers, a former semi-professional basketball team from Salem, Oregon team
- Salem Spartans, a cricket team representing Salem District, Tamil Nadu, India
- Salem Witches (baseball), a former minor league baseball team of the New England League

== Transportation ==
- Salem Airport (disambiguation)
- Salem station (MBTA), a commuter rail station in Salem, Massachusetts
- Salem station (Oregon), a railroad station in Salem, Oregon
- Salem (supertanker), an oil carrier involved in maritime insurance fraud

== Other uses ==
- Salem (name), people with the name
- Salem, a cultivar of rosemary
- USS Salem, three ships of the US Navy

== See also ==
- Salem witch trials, 1692–93, Massachusetts
- Salem witchcraft trial (1878) or second Salem witch trial
  - Salem Maritime National Historic Site
- New Salem (disambiguation)
- South Salem (disambiguation)
- West Salem (disambiguation)
- Salem Creek (disambiguation), various streams
- Salim (disambiguation)
