= Salem, New York (disambiguation) =

Salem, New York is the name of two locations in Washington County, New York in the United States:

- Salem (hamlet), New York
- Salem (town), New York

== See also ==
- Brocton, New York (formerly named Salem)
- Salem (disambiguation)
