= Hockley Valley Resort =

Coordinates: 43.9779°N 80.0471°W

- Location within Southern Ontario
- Location: Mono, Ontario, Canada
- Nearest city: Orangeville
- Vertical: 114 m (374 ft)
- Skiable area: 12 hectares (30 acres)
- Trails: 15
- Longest run: 579 m (1,900 ft)
- Lift system: 4 (2 quad chairlifts, 1 handle tow, 1 magic carpet)
- Lift capacity: 1,200 per hour
- Snowfall: 2.5 m (98 in)
- Snowmaking: 100%
- Night skiing: Yes (Tue-Sat, 5pm-9pm)
- Website: www.hockley.com

The Hockley Valley Resort is a ski retreat, an 18-hole championship golf course, and a conference centre in Canada. It has 15 runs and four ski lifts.

The town of Mono also features the Hockley Valley Provincial Nature Reserve. The resort, initially a small hotel and ski retreat, was purchased by Nancy Adamo in 1985. In 1986, it underwent a $250 million revamp to become a resort, spa, and conference centre. By 2000, it employed 250 staff.

The property was previously Hockley Hills Resort. Later, it became Heritage Village Canada, affiliated with Jim Bakker's Heritage USA. Plans were abandoned, and it ran independently shortly afterward. Eventually, it became Hockley Valley Resort.
