= Salem metropolitan area =

Salem metropolitan area may refer to:

- Salem, Oregon metropolitan area, United States
- Salem, Ohio micropolitan area, United States
- Salem metropolitan area (India), Tamil Nadu

== See also ==
- Salem (disambiguation)
