= Salem, Ontario =

Salem may refer to one of seven places with that name in Ontario, Canada:

- Bruce County
  - Salem, Arran–Elderslie, Ontario, in the municipality of Arran–Elderslie
  - Salem, South Bruce, Ontario, in the municipality of South Bruce
- Salem, Dufferin County, Ontario, part of the Town of Mono
- Salem, Durham Regional Municipality, Ontario, in the municipality of Clarington
- Salem, Frontenac County, Ontario, in the municipality of South Frontenac
- Salem, Northumberland County, Ontario, in the municipality of Cramahe
- Salem, Wellington County, Ontario, in the municipality of Centre Wellington

== See also ==
- Salem (disambiguation)
- Salem Corners in the municipality of Kawartha Lakes
- Salem Creek (Ontario), a stream that flows past Salem, Northumberland County to Lake Ontario
- Mount Salem, Ontario, a community in the municipal township of Malahide, Elgin County
