= Derby Waterfront District =

Historic district in Massachusetts, United States

- Historic Derby Street Neighborhood
- U.S. National Register of Historic Places
- U.S. Historic district
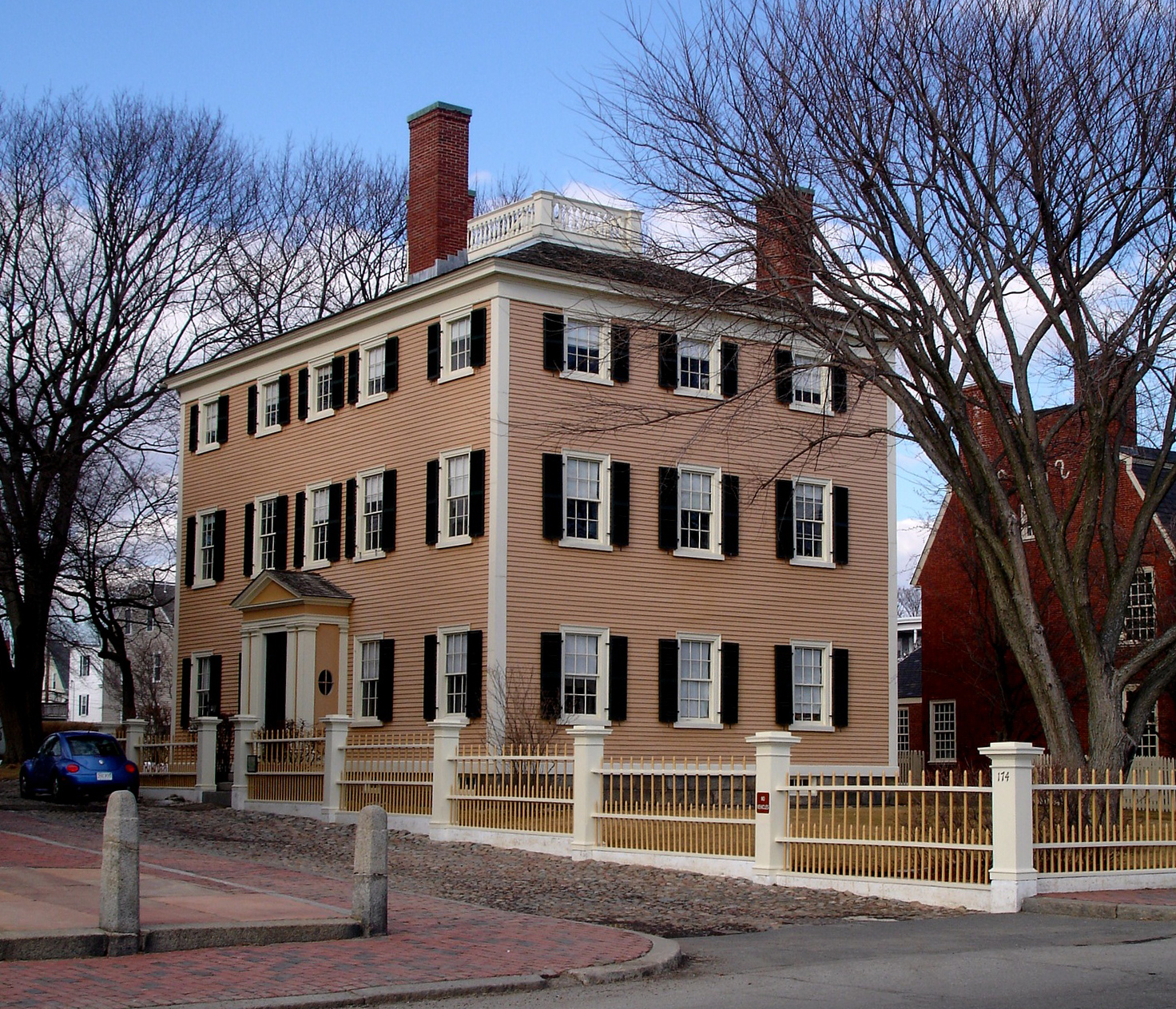
- Hawkes House

- Location within Massachusetts Location within the United States
- Location: Salem, Massachusetts
- Coordinates: 42°31′18″N 70°53′6″W
- Built: 1735
- Architectural style: Federal
- NRHP reference No.: 76000297
- Added to NRHP: May 17, 1976

The Historic Derby Street Neighborhood, also known as the Derby Waterfront District in Salem, Massachusetts encompasses a historically significant portion of the waterfront area of the city. It encompasses properties along Derby Street, which parallels the waterfront, eastward from the Salem Maritime National Historic Site to its junction with Fort Avenue, and includes properties on the side streets between Derby and the waterfront. In addition to the National Historic Site, it includes the House of Seven Gables, a National Historic Landmark District.

The district features Federal architecture and was added to the National Register of Historic Places in 1976.

== Gallery ==
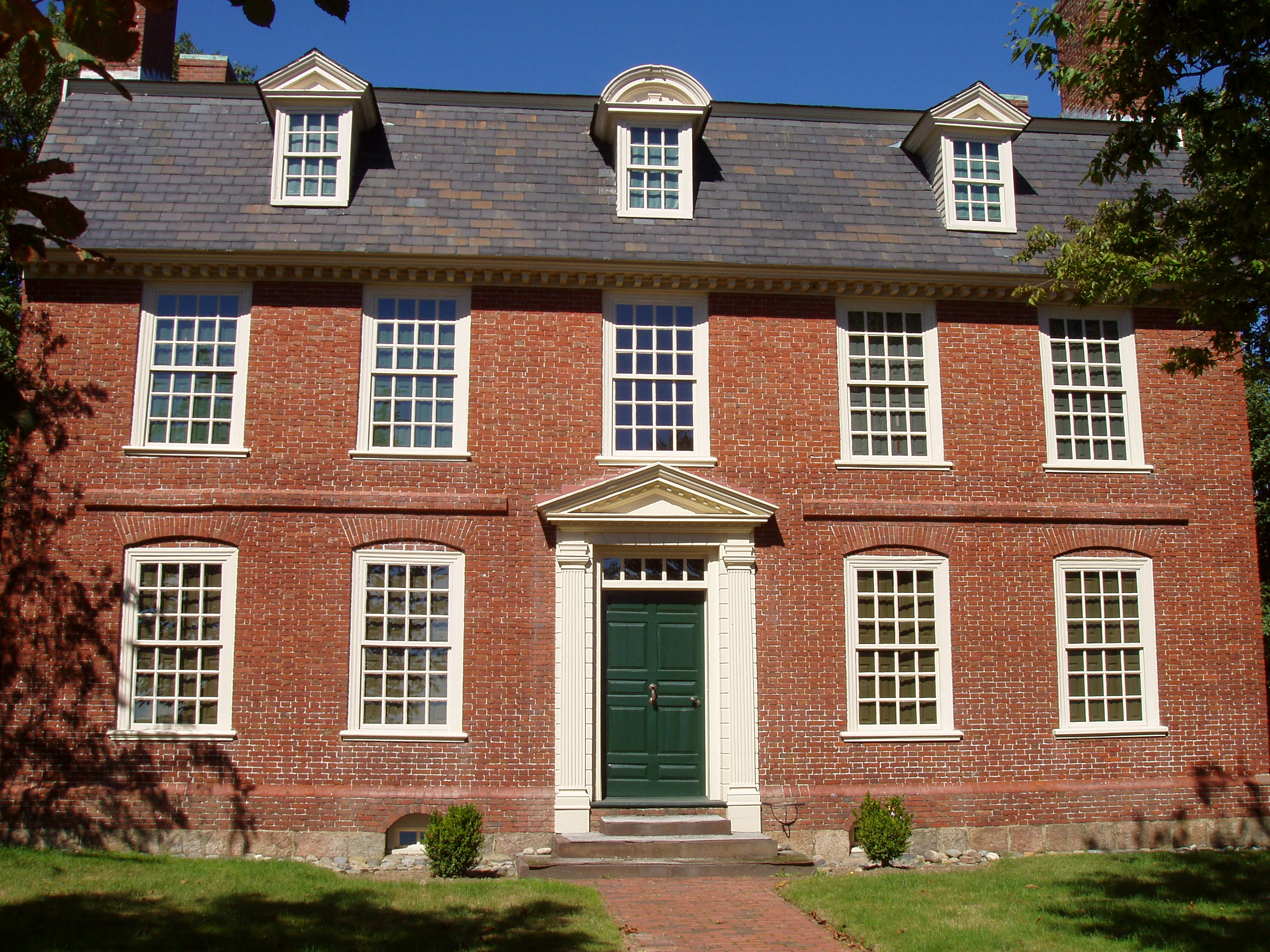
Derby House - circa 1762

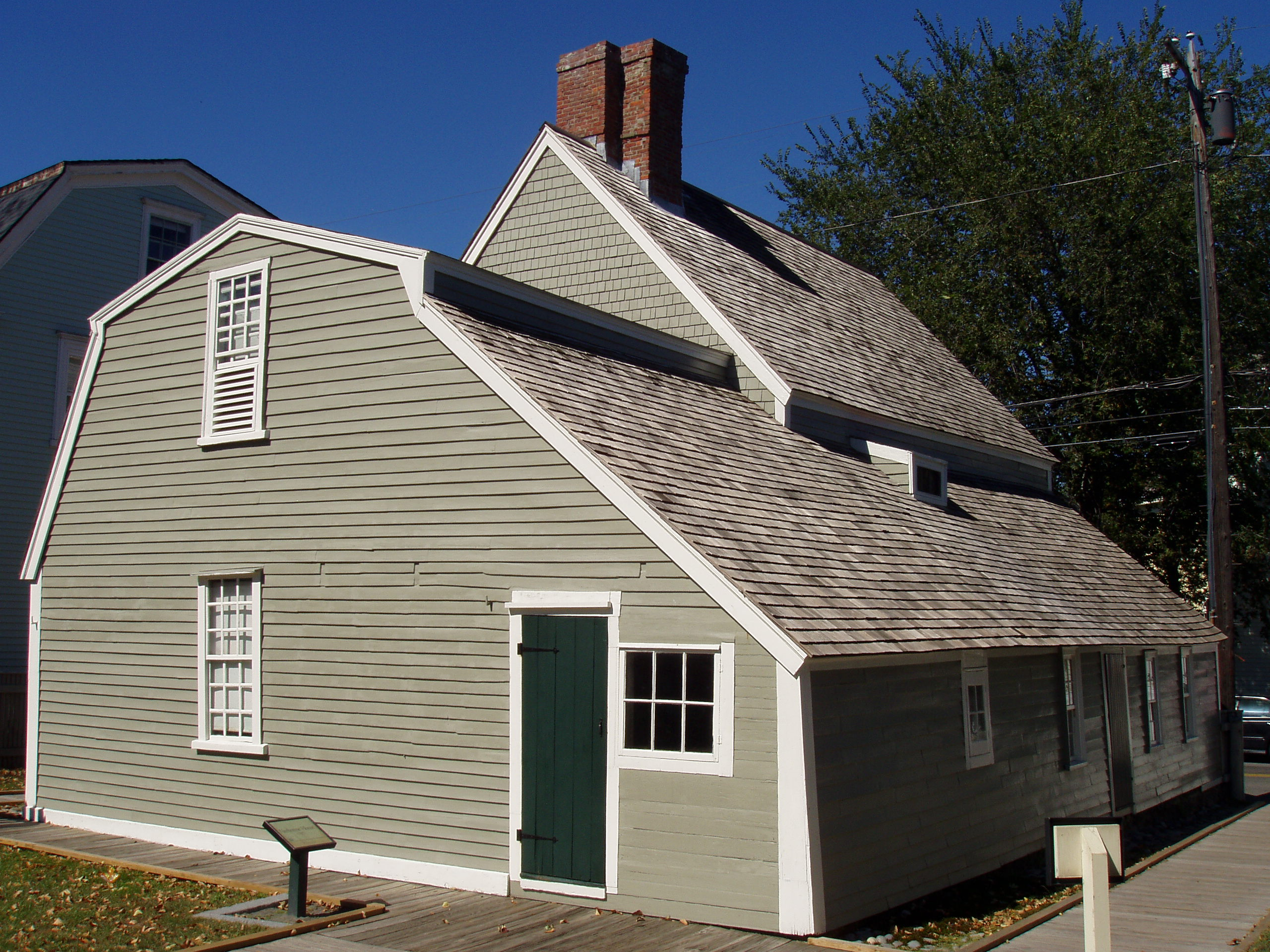
Narbonne House - circa 1675

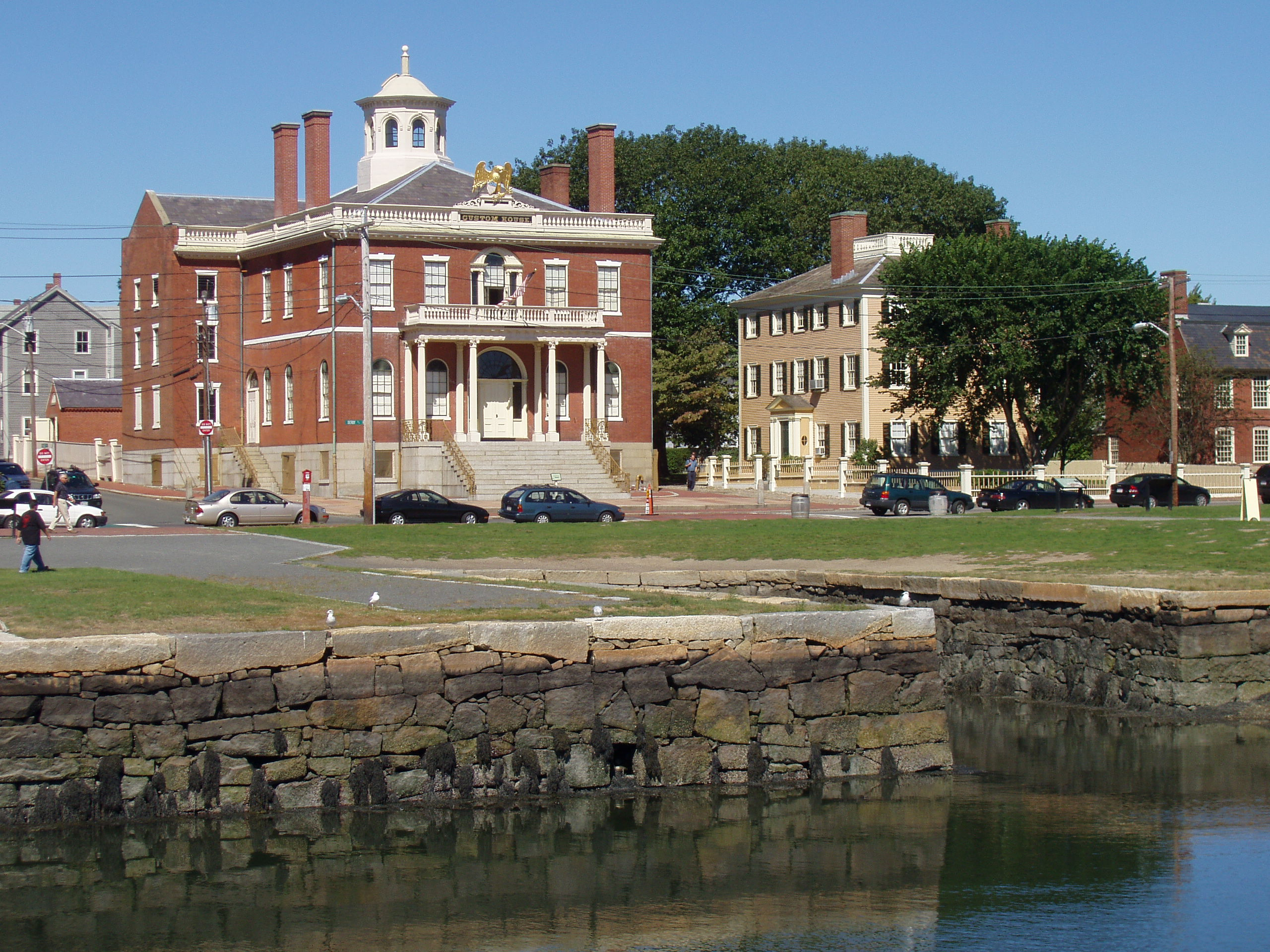
Salem Customs House - circa 1819

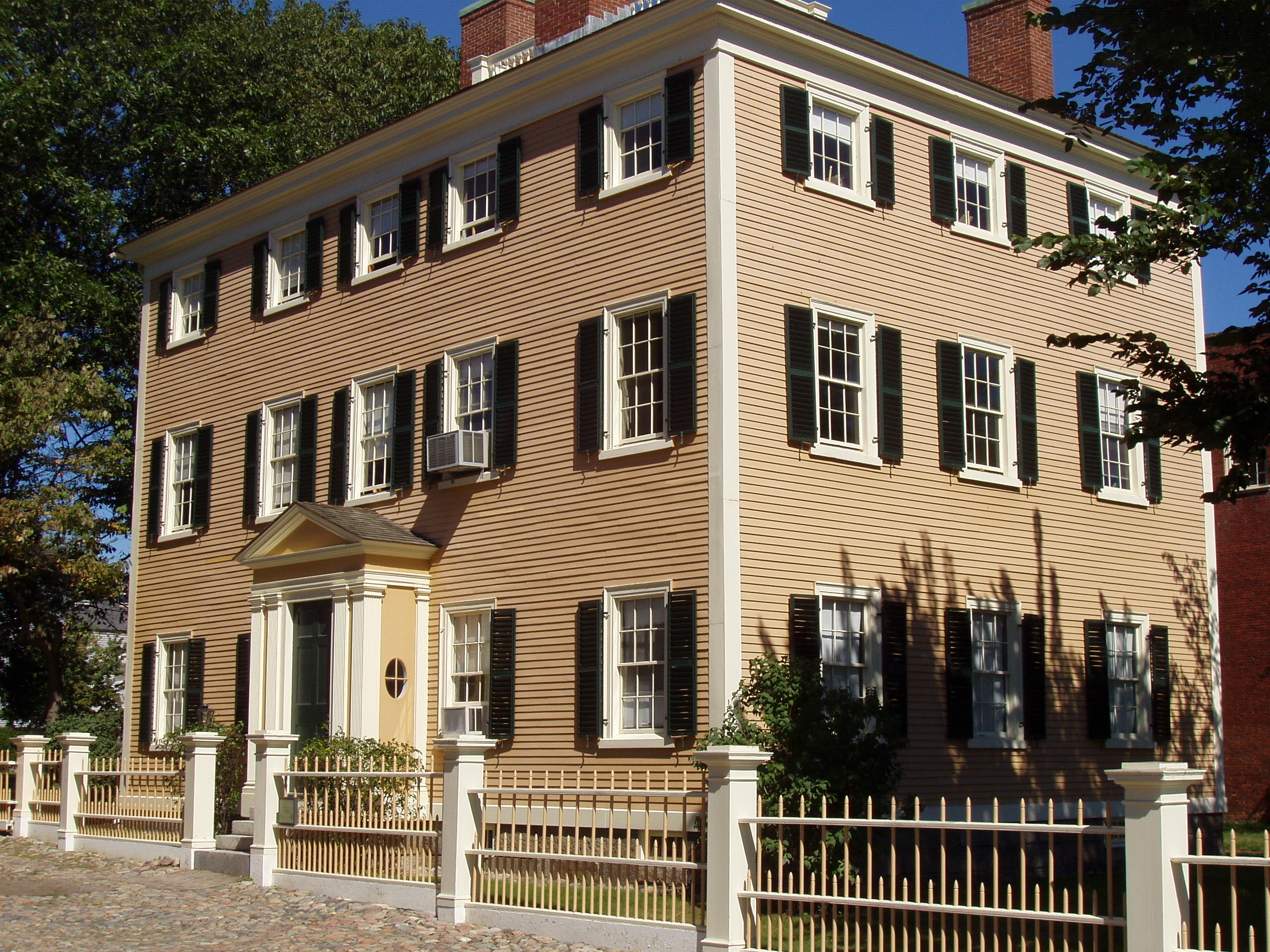
Hawkes House - circa 1780, 1800

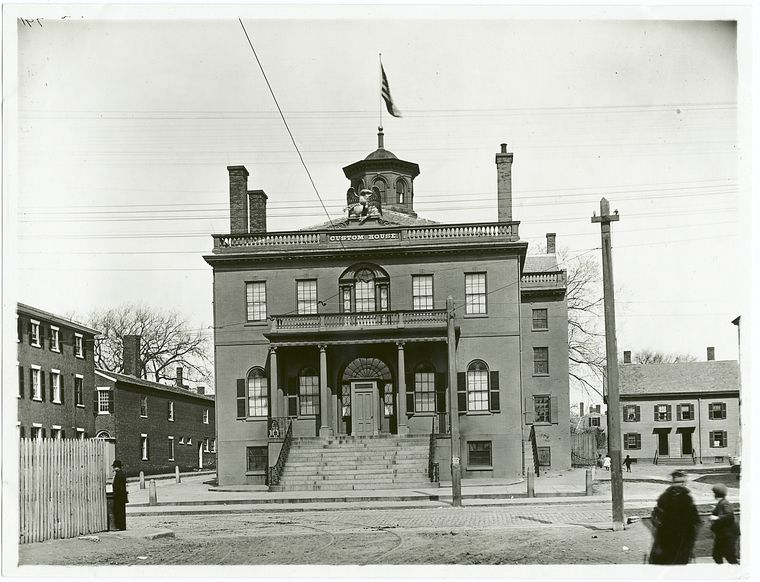
Custom House, ca. 1880

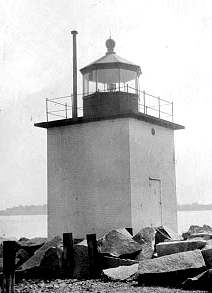
Derby Wharf Light

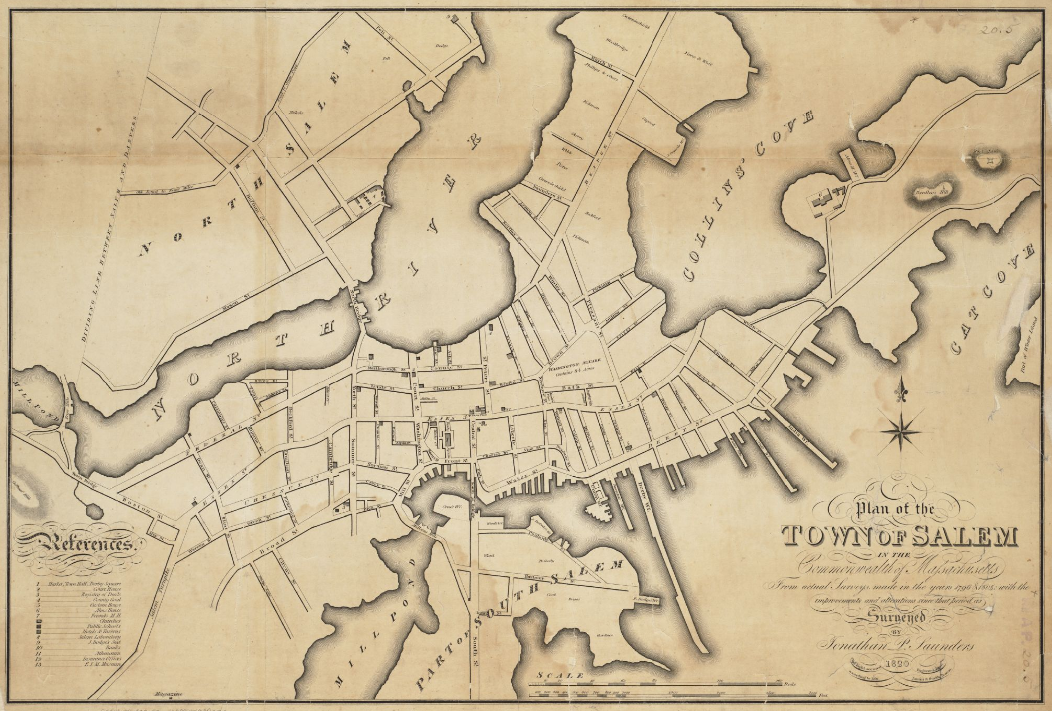
Salem - 1820

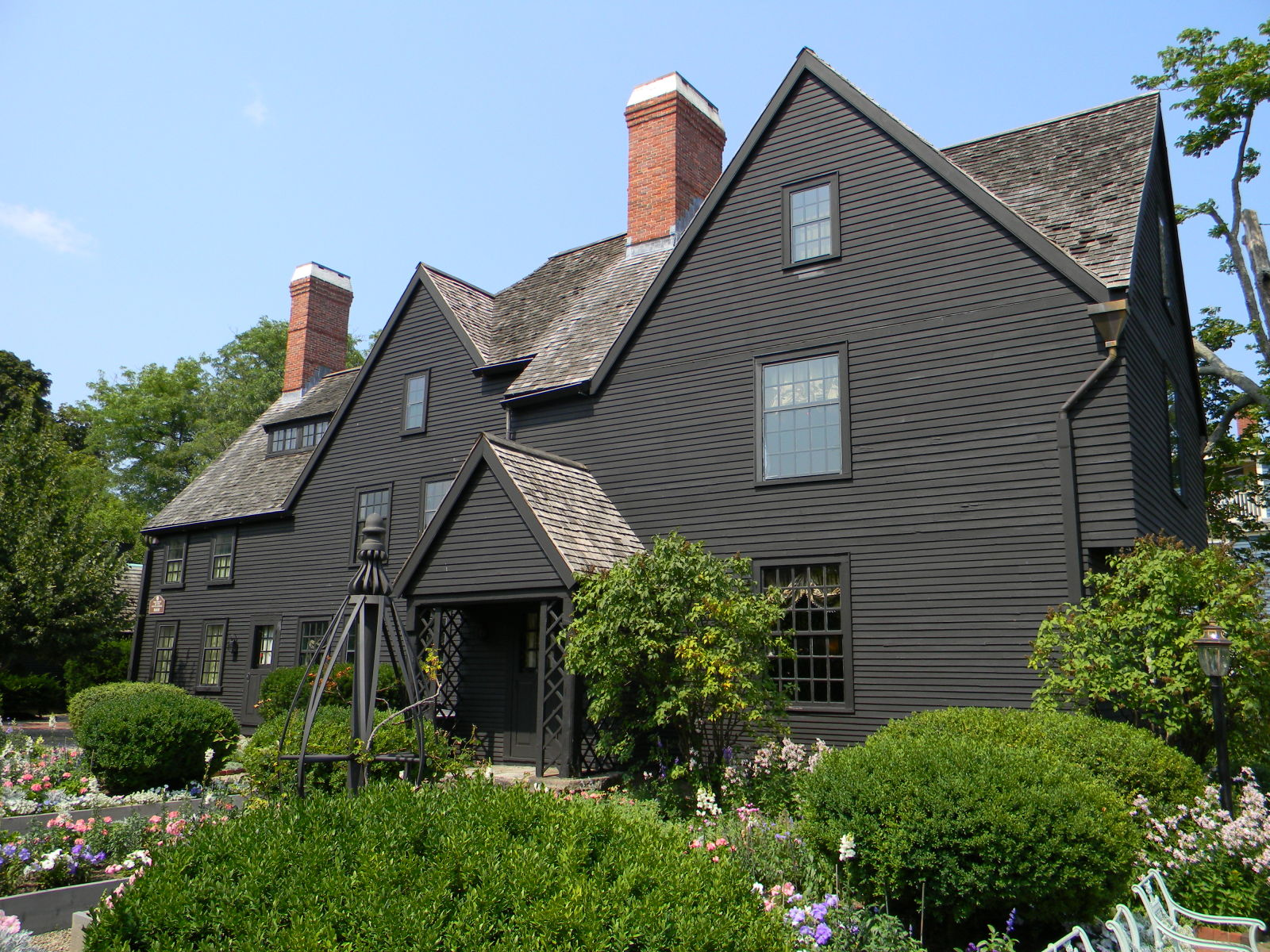
House of Seven Gables, 2015

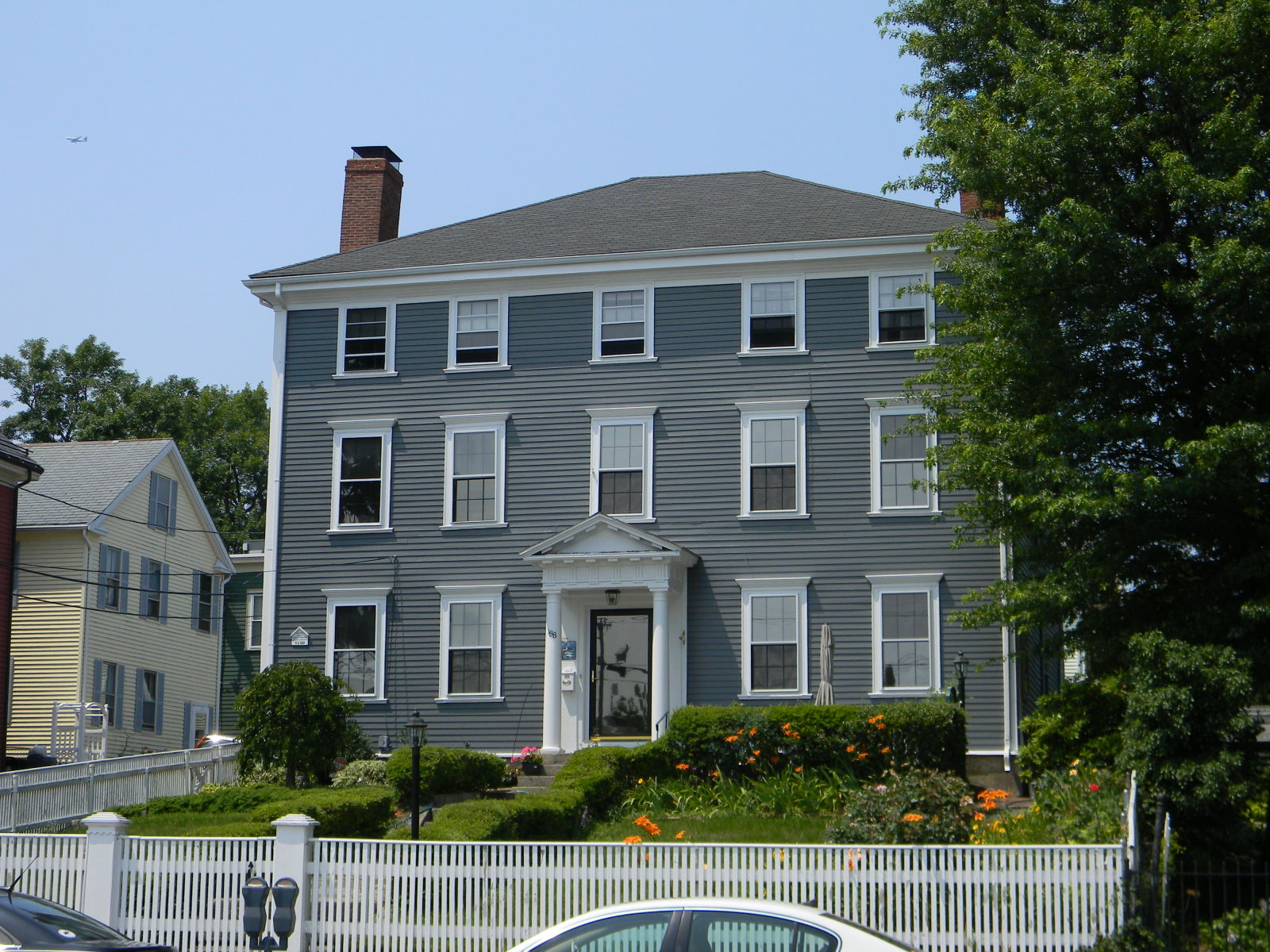
Brookhouse Home, 2015

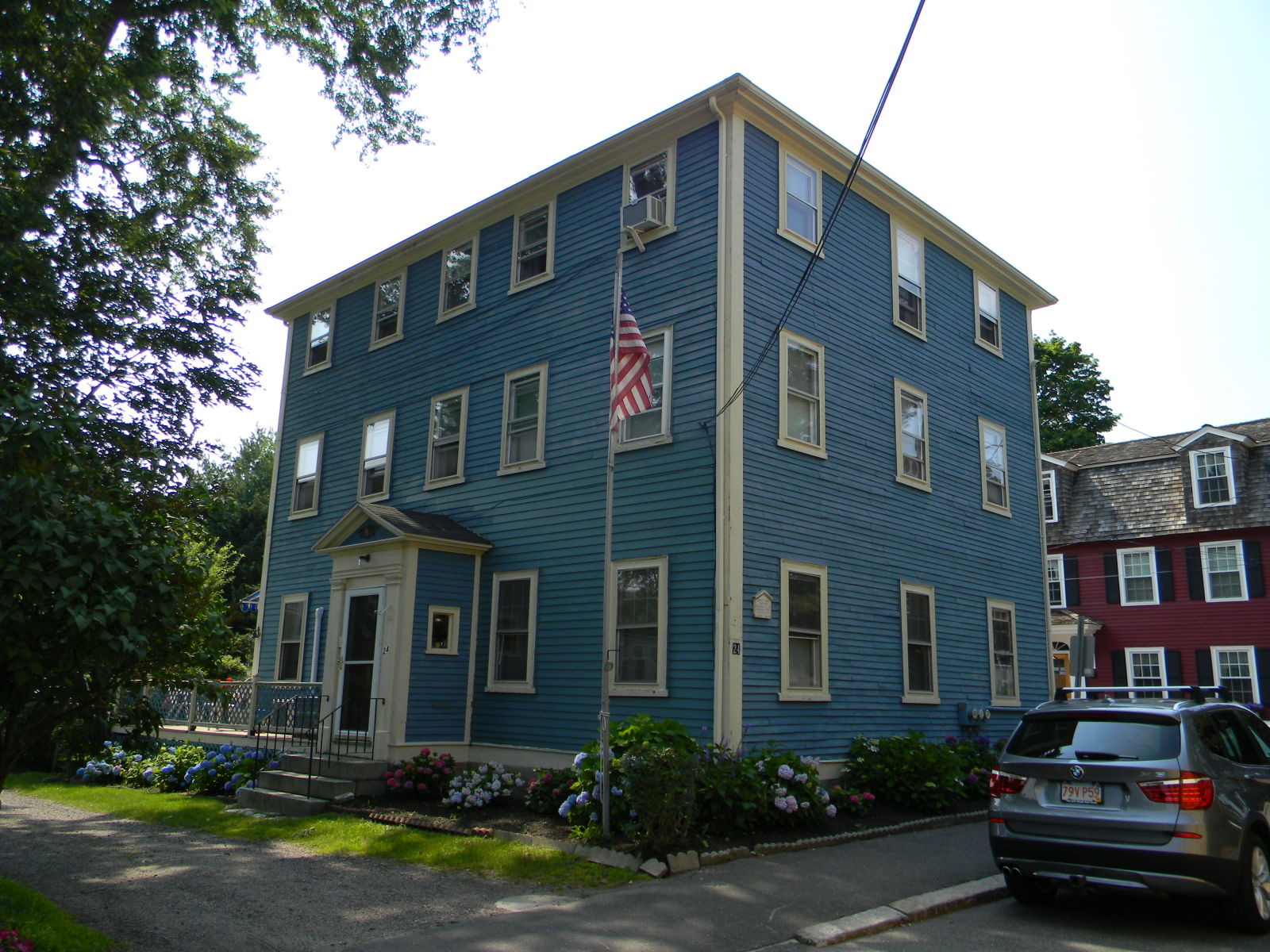
Captain William Allen House, 2015

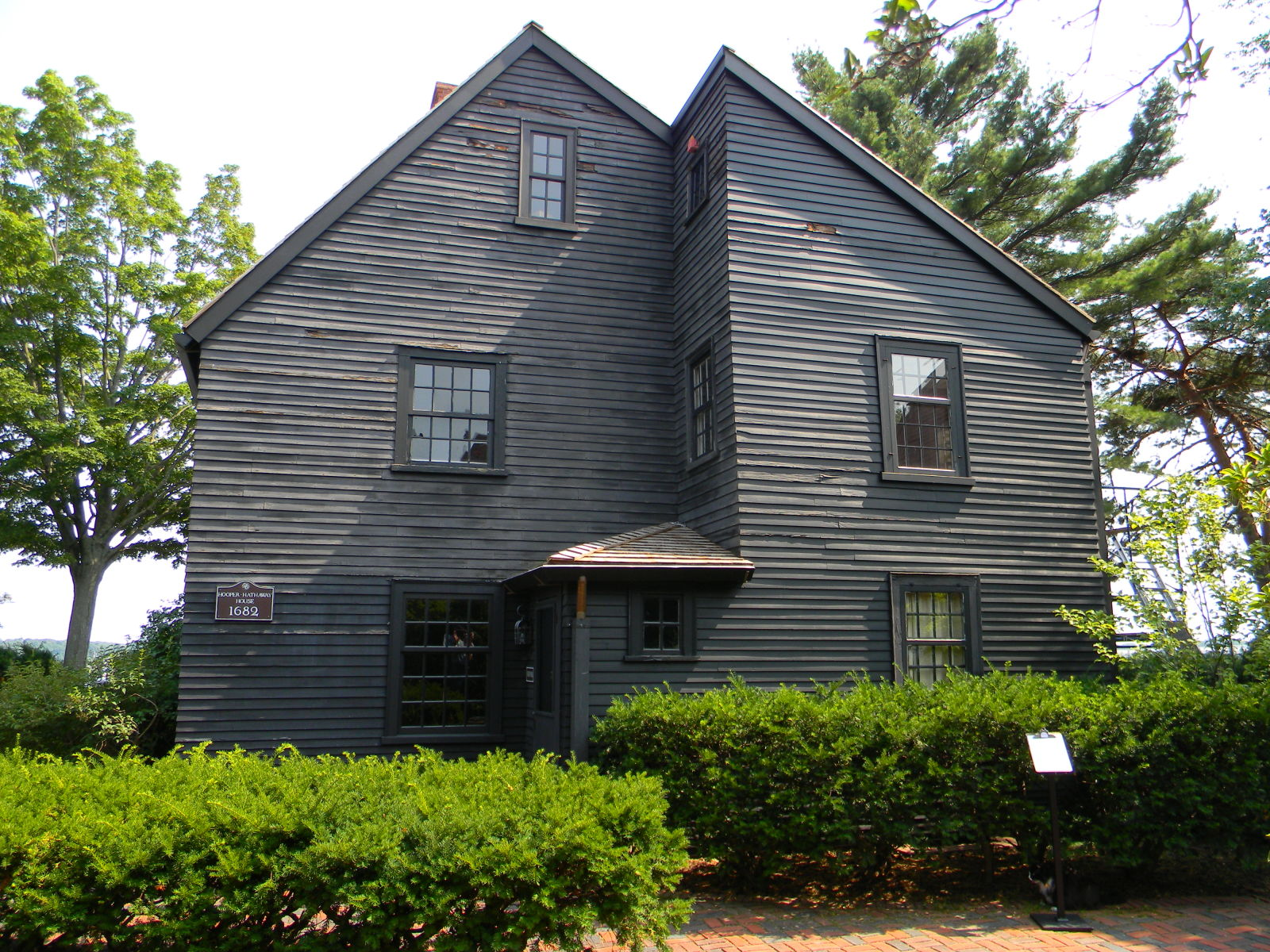
Hooper-Hathaway House, 2015

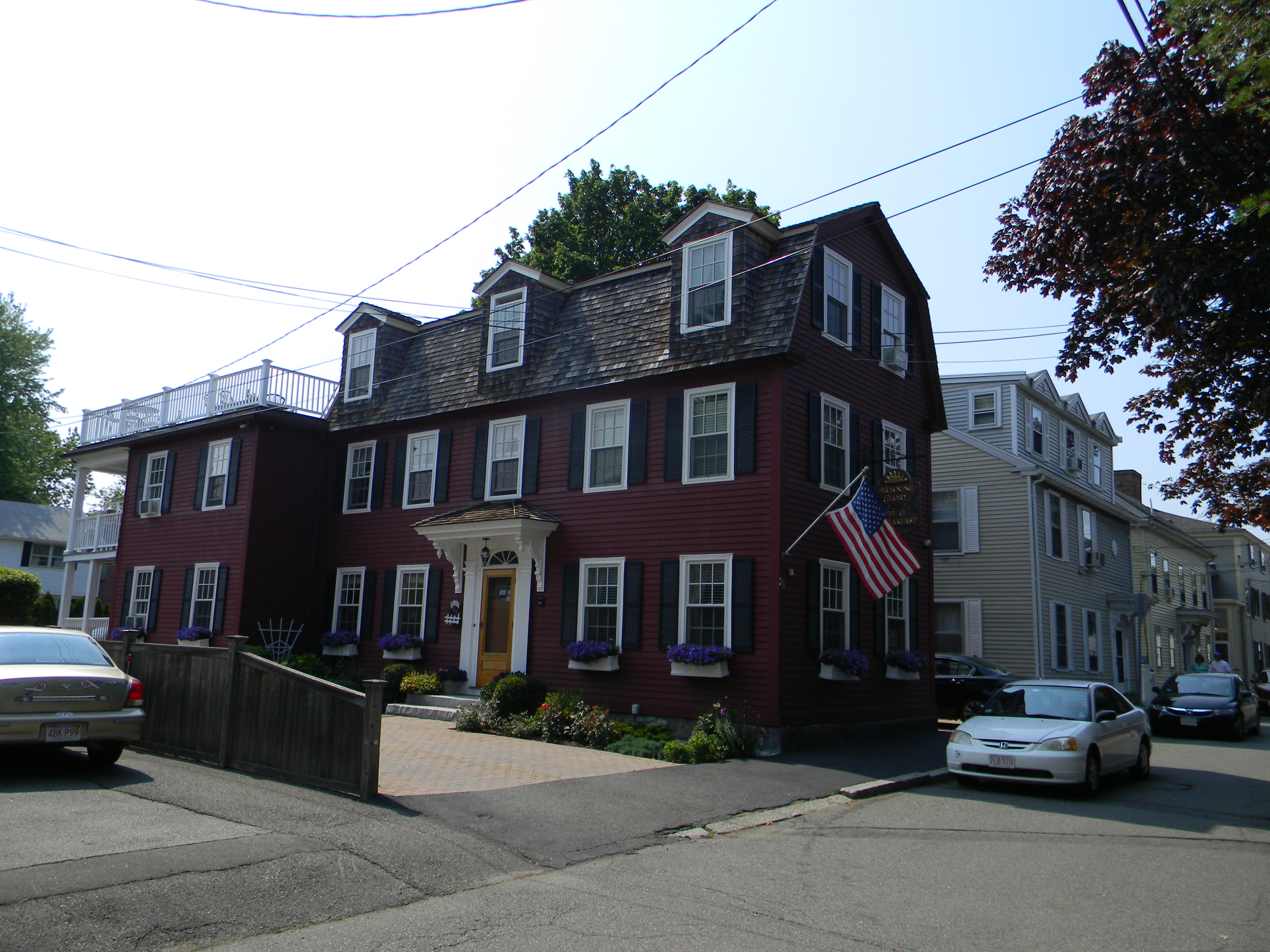
Morning Glory Bed and Breakfast, 2015

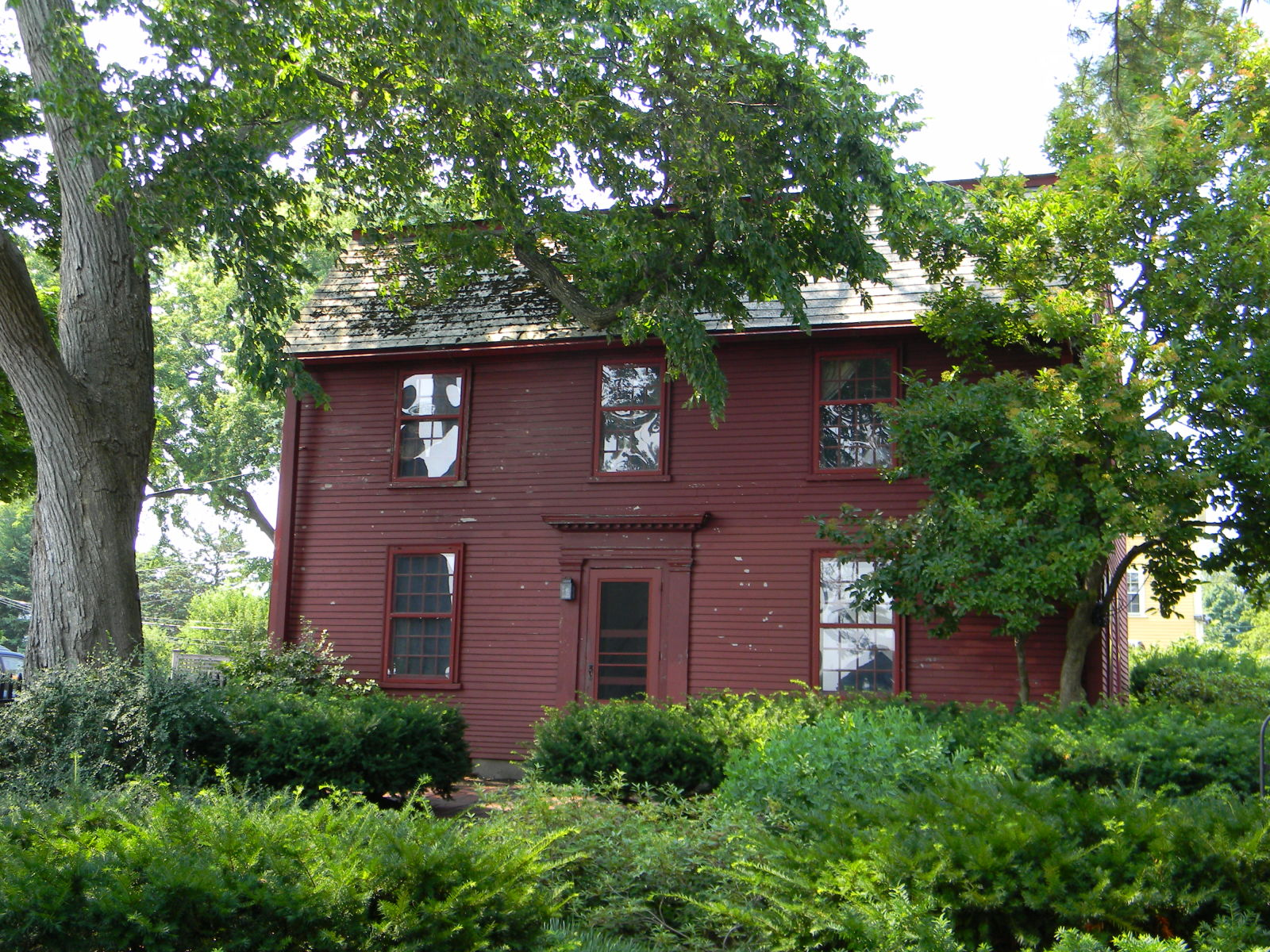
Nathaniel Hawthorne's Birthplace, 2015

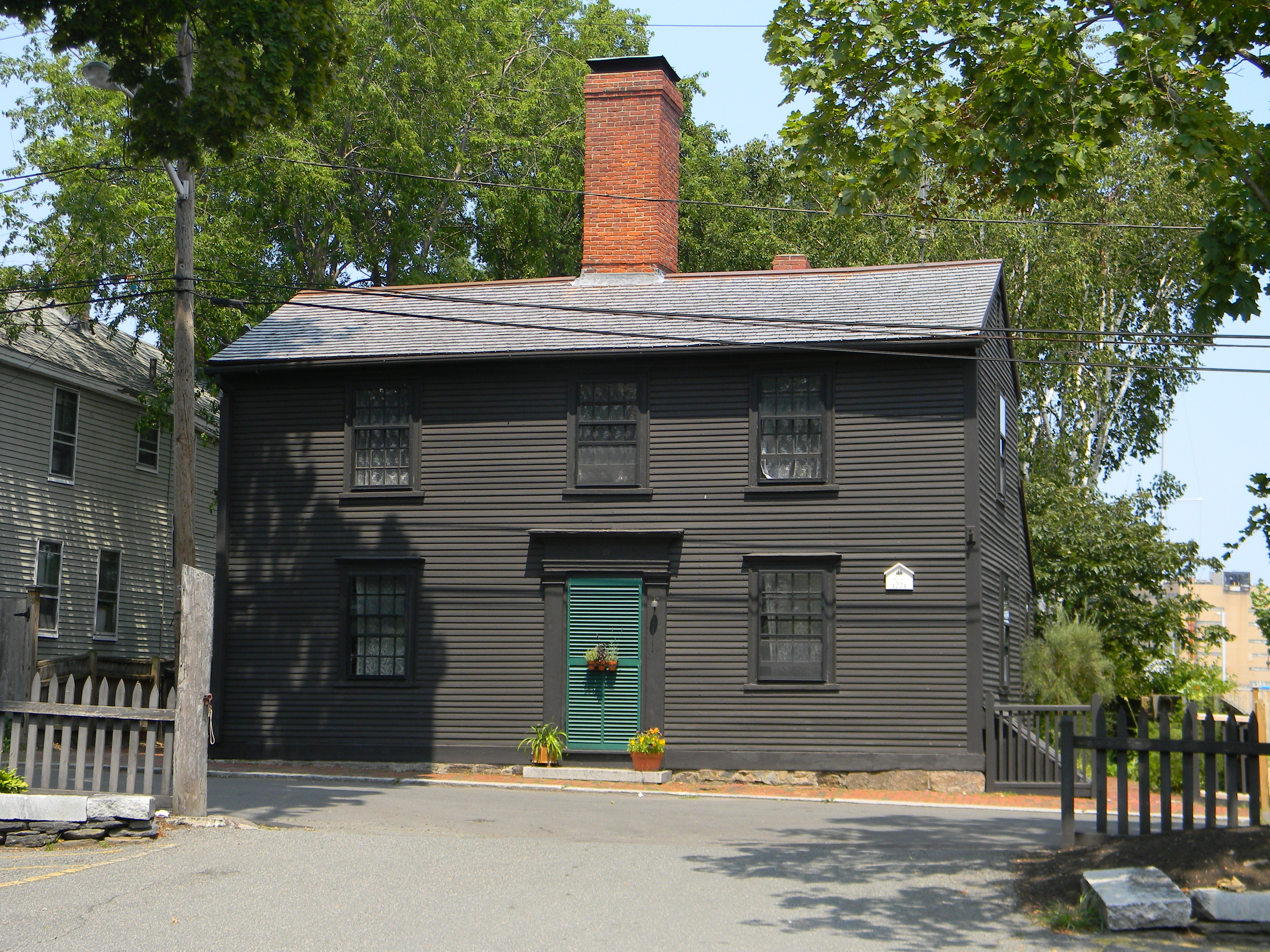
Penn Townsend House, 2015

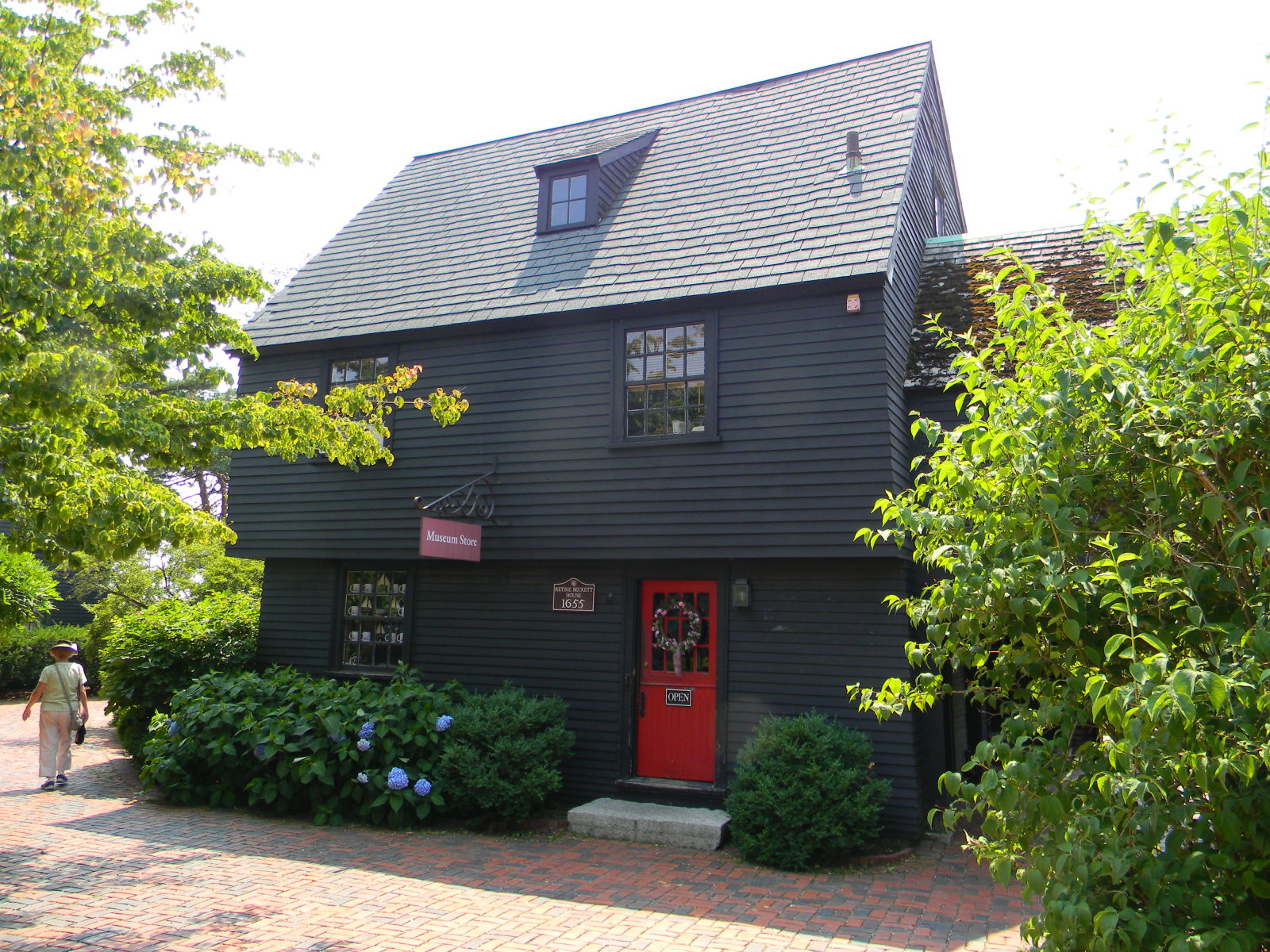
Retire Beckett House, 2015

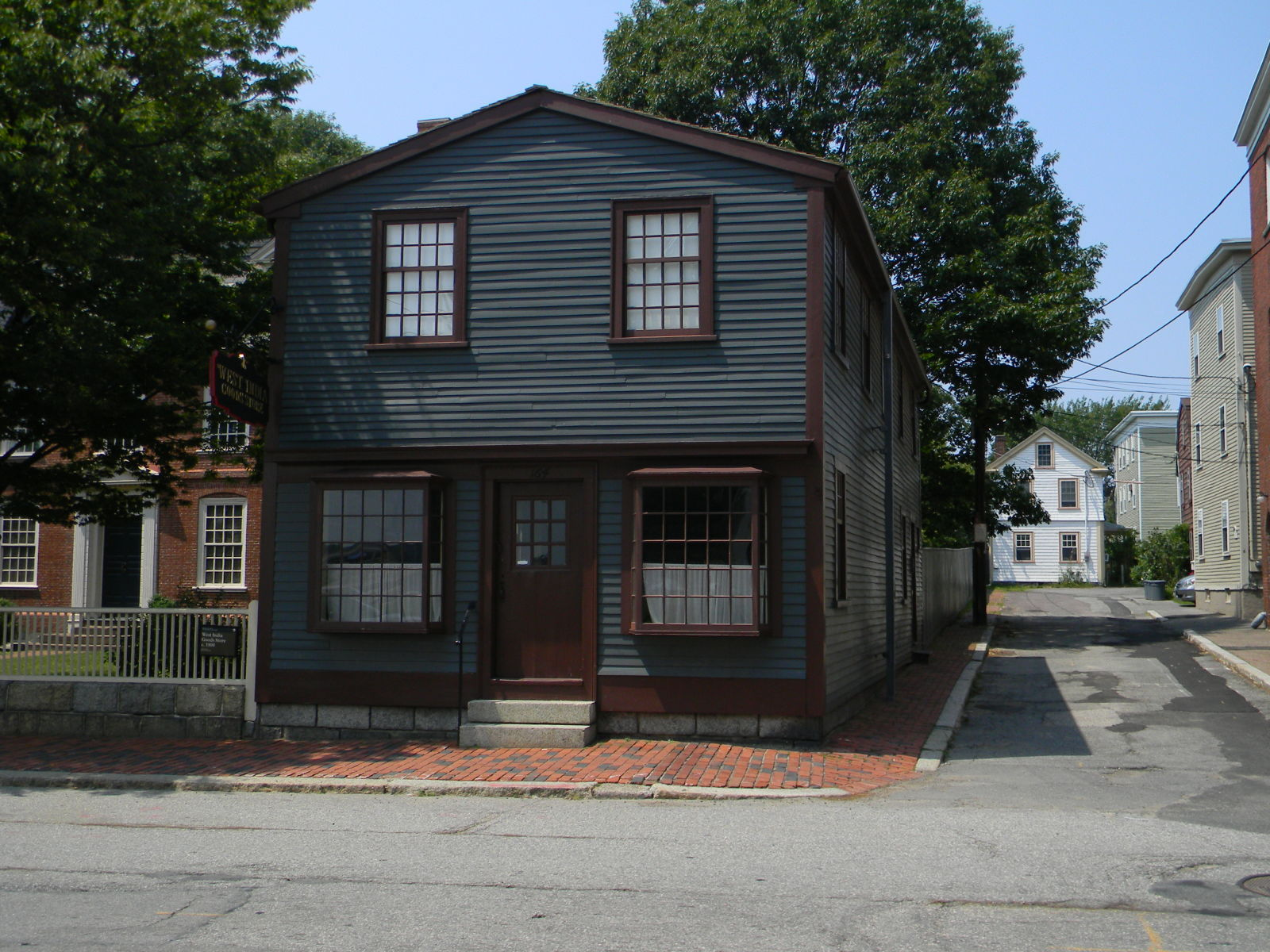
West India Goods Store, 2015

== See also ==
- List of the oldest buildings in Massachusetts
- List of the oldest buildings in the United States
- List of historic houses in Massachusetts
- National Register of Historic Places listings in Salem, Massachusetts
- National Register of Historic Places listings in Essex County, Massachusetts
