= New Salem =

New Salem is the name of several places:

In Canada:

- New Salem, Nova Scotia

In the United States:

- Lincoln's New Salem, a recreated former frontier village in Menard County, Illinois
- New Salem, Pike County, Illinois
- New Salem Township, McDonough County, Illinois
- New Salem Township, Pike County, Illinois
- New Salem, Rush County, Indiana
- New Salem, Washington County, Indiana
- New Salem, Kansas
- New Salem, Massachusetts
- New Salem, Michigan
- New Salem, New York
- New Salem, North Dakota
- New Salem, Ohio
- New Salem, Pennsylvania, a borough in York County
- New Salem, Armstrong County, Pennsylvania
- New Salem-Buffington, Pennsylvania
- New Salem, Fayette County, Pennsylvania, a census-designated place
- New Salem, Texas

== See also ==
- West Salem (disambiguation)
- Salem (disambiguation)
