= Derby Wharf Light =

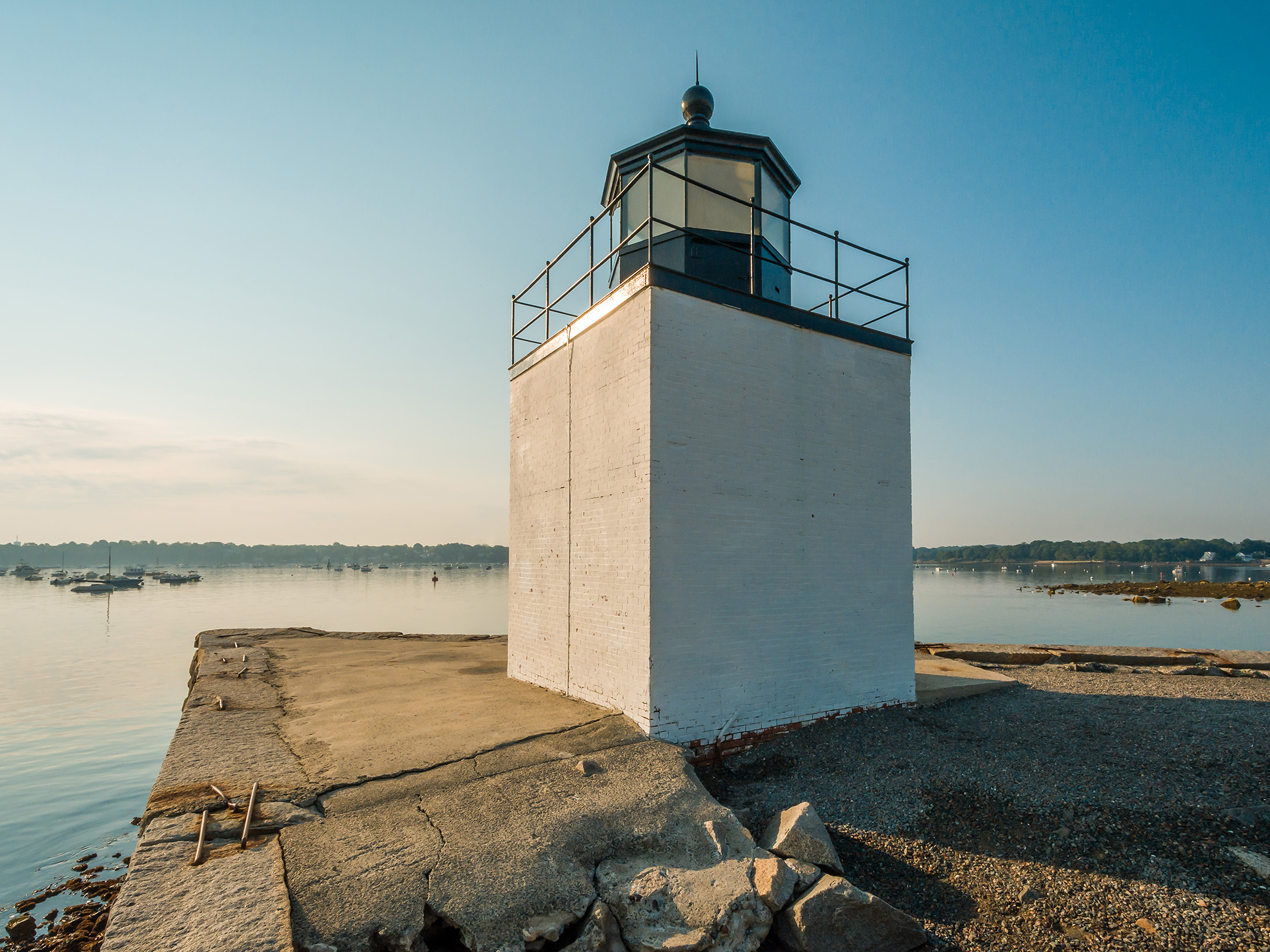
- Location: Salem, Massachusetts
- Coordinates: 42°30′59.6″N 70°53′0.9″W

Tower
- Constructed: 1871
- Construction: Brick
- Automated: 1970s
- Height: 4 m (13 ft)
- Shape: Square
- Markings: White Black
- Heritage: National Register of Historic Places listed place
- Fog signal: none

Light
- First lit: 1871
- Deactivated: 1977–1983
- Focal height: 25 feet (7.6 m)
- Lens: 5th order Fresnel lens 1871-1906; 4th order 1906-1910; 6th order 1910-1970s Solar-powered optic (current)
- Range: 4 nautical miles (7.4 km; 4.6 mi)
- Characteristic: Fl R 6sec
- Derby Wharf Light Station
- U.S. National Register of Historic Places
- MPS: Lighthouses of Massachusetts TR
- NRHP reference No.: 87001466
- Added to NRHP: June 15, 1987

Derby Wharf Light Station is a historic lighthouse on Derby Wharf in Salem, Massachusetts that is within the Salem Maritime National Historic Site.

It was built in 1871 and added to the National Register of Historic Places in 1987. The United States Coast Guard Light List description is "White square tower. Maintained by the U.S. Park Service". The actual light is 25 feet (7.6 m) above Mean High Water. Its red light is visible for 4 nautical miles (7.4 km; 4.6 mi).

== History ==
The Light Station was originally built in 1871 and used an oil lamp shining through a Fresnel lens. For many years, Derby Wharf Light had one of only 17 sixth-order Fresnel lenses in the United States. Today, the light is solar powered, and the light is a red flash every six seconds.

== See also ==
- Derby Waterfront District
- National Register of Historic Places listings in Salem, Massachusetts
- National Register of Historic Places listings in Essex County, Massachusetts
