= Salem Chapel =

Salem Chapel may refer to:

== Chapels ==
=== Canada ===
- British Methodist Episcopal Church, Salem Chapel, St. Catharines, Ontario, Canada

=== United Kingdom ===
==== England ====
- Salem Chapel, East Budleigh, Devon
- Salem Chapel, Leeds, West Yorkshire

==== Scotland ====
- Salem Chapel, Dundee

==== Wales ====
- Capel Salem, Llanbedr, Gwynedd
- Salem Independent Chapel, Llandovery, Carmarthenshire
- Capel Salem, Pwllheli, Gwynedd
- Salem Chapel, Robertstown, Rhondda Cynon Taf

== Other ==
- Salem Chapel Township, Forsyth County, North Carolina, United States

== See also ==
- Salem Church (disambiguation)
