= Mono, Ontario =

Mono
- Town (lower-tier)
- Town of Mono
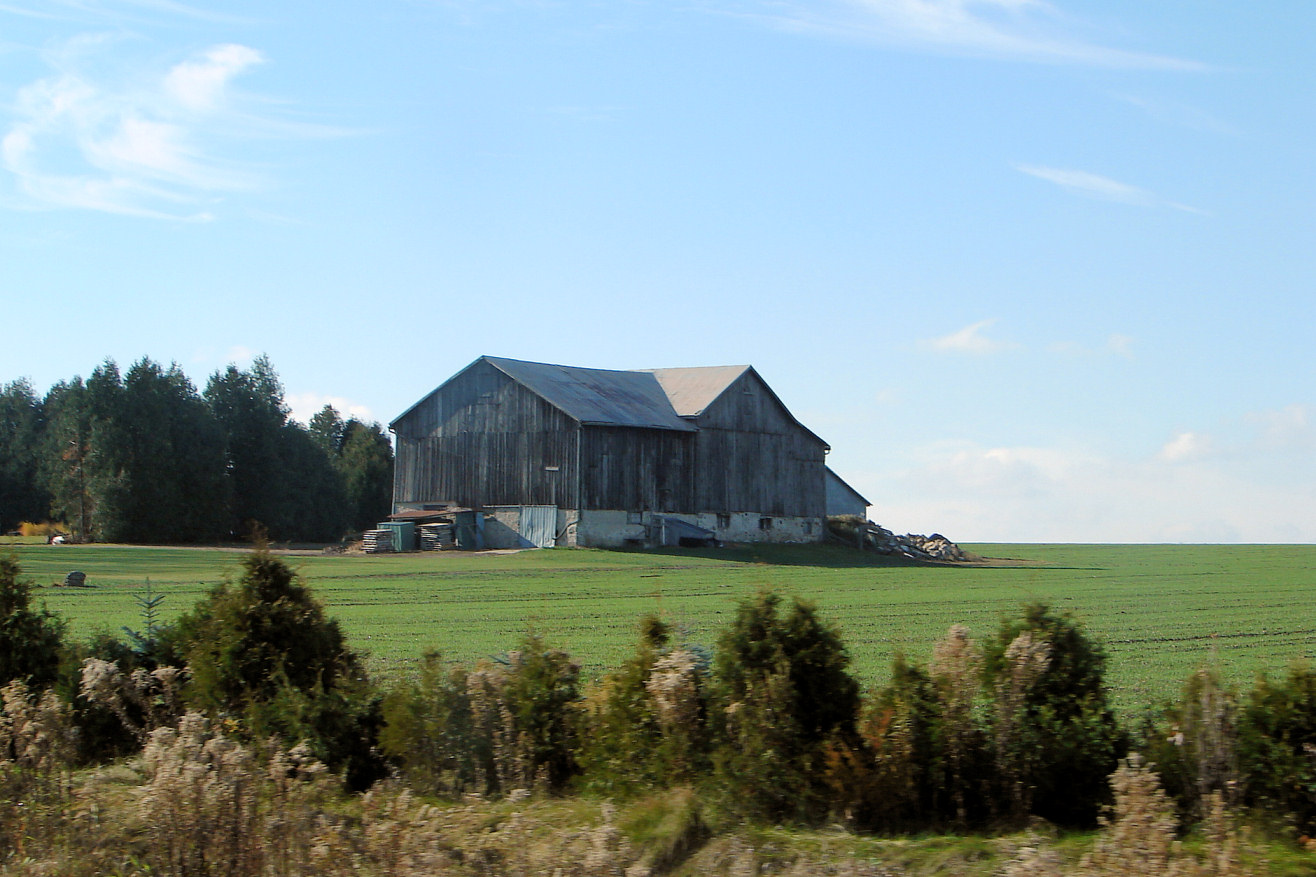

- Coat of arms

- Location of Mono within Dufferin County.

- Location of Mono within southern Ontario
- Coordinates: 44°01′N 80°04′W
- Country: Canada
- Province: Ontario
- County: Dufferin
- Incorporated: January 1, 1850 (township)
- Incorporated: June 1, 1999 (town)

Government
  - Type: Town
  - Mayor: John Creelman
  - Governing Body: Town of Mono Council
  - MP: Kyle Seeback (CPC)
  - MPP: Sylvia Jones (OPC)

Area
  - Land: 278.37 km^{2} (107.48 sq mi)

Population (2021)
  - Total: 9,421
  - Density: 33.8/km^{2} (88/sq mi)
- Time zone: UTC-5 (EST)
  - Summer (DST): UTC-4 (EDT)
- Postal code FSA: L9V & L9W
- Area code: 519
- Website: townofmono.com

Mono is a town situated in south-central Ontario, Canada, at the south-east corner of Dufferin County. It stretches from Highway 9 along its southern border to Highway 89 along its northern border. Its border to the west is with the Township of Amaranth and in the east, it is bordered by the Township of Adjala-Tosorontio.

Mono's residents live on farms, rural estates, and in small settlements. Mono Centre, Hockley Village, and Camilla are among the small communities that lie within the Town of Mono.

Mono's population represents many different backgrounds, including a farming community, local businesses, numerous artists and artisans, commuters who work in neighboring towns and cities, and weekend escapees from the urban bustle.

The origins of the name is believed to be from Sir Peregrine Maitland from Spanish for monkey.

== History ==
The Town of Mono as it currently is organized is the result of governmental changes that were made as the population grew and land uses change.

When "Simcoe District" was formed in 1843 by the Legislative Assembly of Upper Canada, it contained 19 original townships. Simcoe District was restructured in 1845, changing its composition to 24 townships including the Township of Mono. Effective January 1, 1850, An Act for abolishing the Territorial Divisions of Upper Canada into Districts abolished Simcoe "District" in favour of the Simcoe "County", still composed of the Townships noted in the Act of 1845.

The "Provisional County of Dufferin" was initially organized as authorized by the Legislative Assembly of Ontario in 1875 and the actual formation taking effect in 1881, from parts of the counties of Grey, Simcoe and Wellington Counties. The Township of Mulmur and the Township of Mono were transferred from Simcoe to Dufferin in 1881.

To better coordinate common services provided to the communities and consolidate governance within the township, the township reorganized as the Town of Mono on 1 June 1999.

== Geography ==
Mono is a rural community in both geography and character. It has a wide variation in topography, being composed of mostly rolling, tree-covered hills. It holds many streams and creeks which form the headwaters of three rivers - the Humber River, Nottawasaga River and Credit River and most of the town is located on high land relative to the rest of Southern Ontario. This leads to its current slogan of 'the heart of the headwaters'.

=== Communities ===
The town of Mono comprises a number of villages and hamlets, including the following communities:

- Blount
- Camilla
- Cardwell
- Elba
- Elder
- Glen Cross
- Granger
- Hockley (partially)
- Lucille
- Mono Centre
- Primrose (partially)
- Relessey
- Salem
- Woodside
- Coopertown
- Coulterville
- Glenoe
- Gooseville
- Lavertyville
- Lorraine (partially)
- Mono College
- Mono Mills (partially)
- Purple Hill
- Rocktown
- Sheldon (partially)
- Springbrook
- White's Corners
- Cardinal Woods
- Leathertown (partially)
- Mulmur Corners (partially)
- Rosemont (partially)
- Starrview Acres (partially)
- Violet Hill (partially)

== Demographics ==
In the 2021 Census of Population conducted by Statistics Canada, Mono had a population of 9,421 living in 3,131 of its 3,327 total private dwellings, a change of 9.4% from its 2016 population of 8,609. With a land area of 278.37 km^{2} (107.48 sq mi), it had a population density of 33.8/km^{2} (87.7/sq mi) in 2021.

Historical census populations – Mono, Ontario

Year	Pop.	±%
1871	3,980	—
1881	4,097	+2.9%
1891	3,518	−14.1%
1901	3,111	−11.6%
1911	2,677	−14.0%
1921	2,124	−20.7%
1931	2,017	−5.0%
1941	1,903	−5.7%

Year	Pop.	±%
1951	1,895	−0.4%
1956	2,157	+13.8%
1961	2,138	−0.9%
1966	2,133	−0.2%
1971	2,735	+28.2%
1976	3,681	+34.6%
1981	4,110	+11.7%
1986	4,270	+3.9%

Year	Pop.	±%
1991	5,782	+35.4%
1996	6,552	+13.3%
2001	6,922	+5.6%
2006	7,071	+2.2%
2011	7,546	+6.7%
2016	8,609	+14.1%
2021	9,421	+9.4%

Population counts are not adjusted for boundary changes.
Source: Statistics Canada

== Recreation and tourism ==
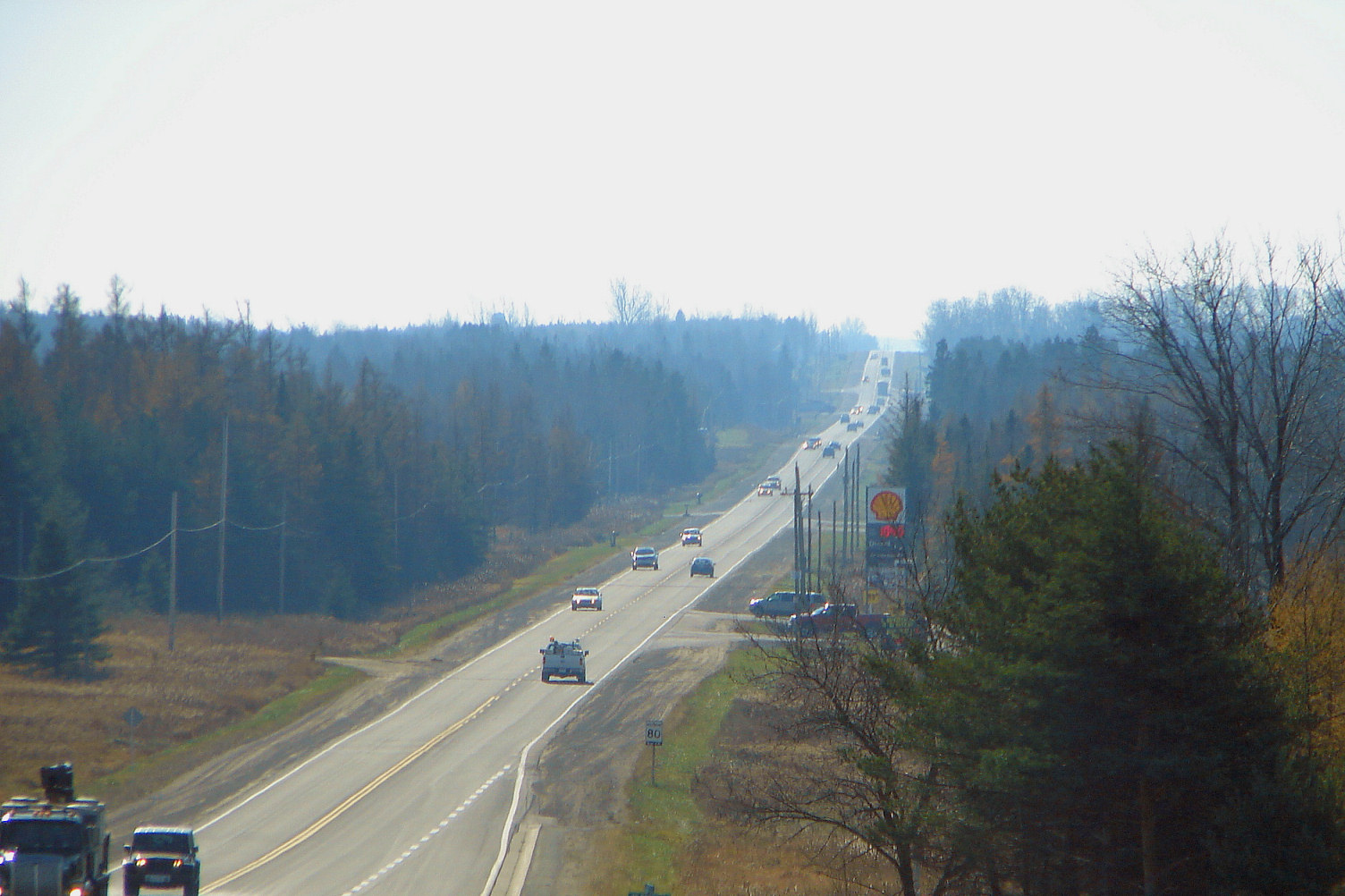
Ontario Highway 10 through Mono

Mono Cliffs Provincial Park is one place where the Niagara Escarpment puts out a dramatic appearance. The dominant features of the park are three Escarpment outcrops known as the Mono Rocks. The Toronto District School Board operates an outdoor education and conference centre located within the park. Also, the Bruce Trail goes through this area, linking it to the nearby Hockley Valley Provincial Nature Reserve.

The Hockley Valley itself is a popular destination for tourists in the fall wishing to take in the changing colors of the leaves in autumn. Outside of the Bruce Trail, there are several parks and the Niagara Escarpment is a UNESCO protected Biosphere reserve, one of only 12 in Canada.

There are several recreational attractions in the region as well. The Hockley Valley Resort is located on the 3rd Line of Mono. The Resort has both a golf course for activities in the summer and a popular ski resort for winter get-aways. There are also cross country skiing trails at Monora Park. There is much debate between residents and non residents as to the correct way to pronounce the name Mono, the correct way is mow-no. The Indigenous name Mahnoo, means "let it be so." The original name was Monadh (Irish pronounced it Monaah and later residents, Mowna) named by the Irish potato farmers who came to these higher elevations to get early crops.

There are several historic hamlets or villages in the Town of Mono. They include Camilla, Elba, Relessey, Mono Centre, Glen Cross, Granger, Hockley and Blount. The first woman lawyer in Canada, Clara Brett Martin, received her elementary education at Perry's School built in 1866, located in the Hamlet of Blount in South Mono. The Hamlet's post office was established in 1888 and the first postmaster was William Woods. Mono Cliff Inn in Mono Centre was Baker's General Store.

== References in popular culture ==
James Cameron, the director of the 1997 film Titanic, spent time in his childhood in the Caledon region to the south and still has family there. As a tribute to his youth, he named the villain in Titanic, Caledon Hockley, after both Caledon and the Hockley Valley area.

The Wingfield Series of plays is set in a fictional small town in Ontario called Persephone Township. Many of the jokes and personalities are taken from, among other sources, Mono Township. For example, the debate over the pronunciation of Persephone reflects the debate over the pronunciation of Mono. Playwright Dan Needles created the character while working in Shelburne, Ontario.

Portions of the TV series Schitt's Creek are filmed at a motel located in Mono.

== See also ==
- List of townships in Ontario
