= West Salem =

West Salem is the name of several places in the United States:

- West Salem, Illinois
- West Salem, Ohio
- West Salem, Salem, Oregon, the Polk County portion of Salem
- West Salem, Wisconsin
- West Salem Township, Pennsylvania

== See also ==
- Salem West Assembly constituency, Tamil Nadu, India
- Salem (disambiguation)
- New Salem (disambiguation)
