= Salem Maritime National Historical Park =

National Historical Park of the United States

- U.S. National Register of Historic Places
- U.S. National Historical Park
- U.S. Historic district
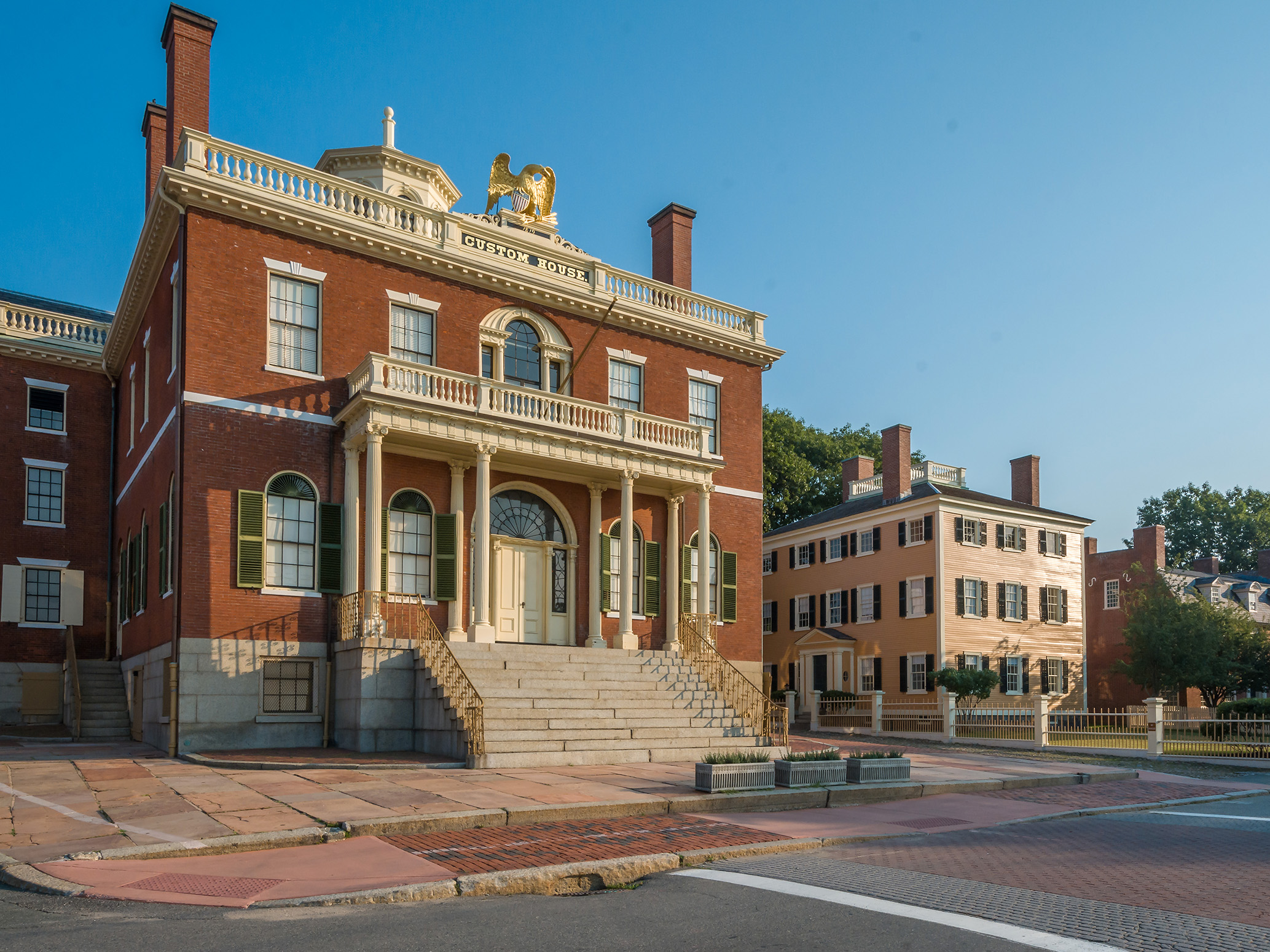
- Salem Custom House (1819)

- Location within Massachusetts Location within the United States
- Location: Essex County, Massachusetts, US
- Nearest city: Salem, Massachusetts
- Coordinates: 42°31′14″N 70°53′14″W
- Area: 9 acres (0.036 km^{2})
- Visitation: 569,839 (2025)
- Website: Salem Maritime National Historic Site
- NRHP reference No.: 66000048

Significant dates
- Added to NRHP: September 1, 1976
- Designated NHP: March 17, 1938

The Salem Maritime National Historical Park is a national historical park consisting of 12 historic structures, one replica tall-ship, and about 9 acres (36,000 m^{2}) of land along the waterfront of Salem Harbor in Salem, Massachusetts, United States.

The park was created on March 17, 1938 as Salem Maritime National Historic Site, the first to be established in the United States. It interprets the Triangle Trade during the colonial period, in cotton, rum, sugar and slaves; the actions of privateers during the American Revolution; and global maritime trade with the Far East, after independence. The National Park Service manages both the National Historical Park and a Regional Visitor Center in downtown Salem. The National Park Service (NPS) is an agency of the United States Department of the Interior.

In 2014, the National Park Service, which runs the Salem Maritime National Historic Site, released figures and statistics for 2012: there were 756,038 visitors to Salem who spent an estimated $40,000,000. The National Park Service celebrated its 100th anniversary in 2016.

On July 16, 2025, the park was redesignated as a national historical park.

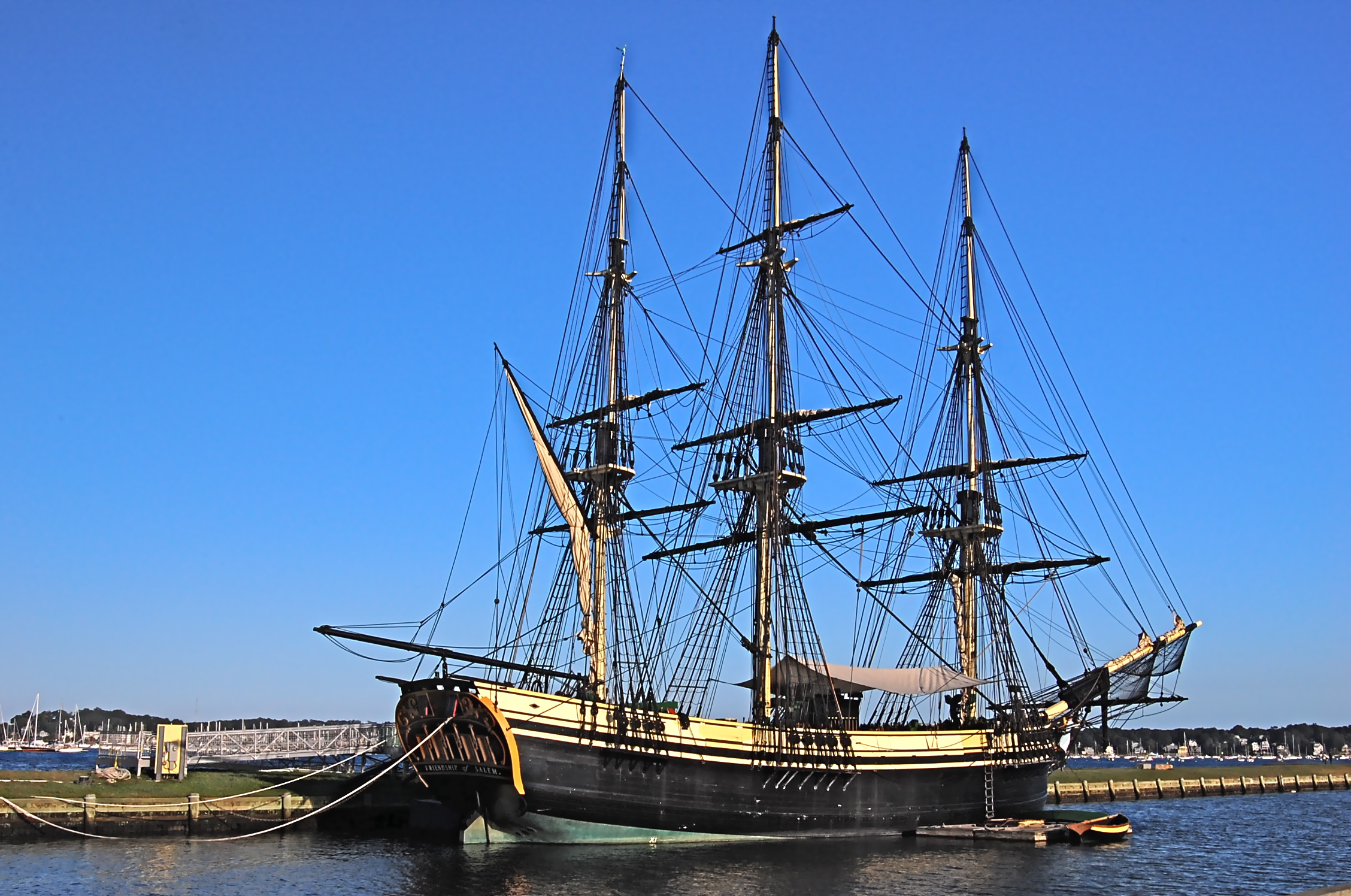
The Friendship replica docked off Derby Street

== Properties ==
The site preserves and interprets numerous maritime resources in the form of artifacts, collections and structures, including:

- Derby House (1762) – built in 1762 by Captain Richard Derby as a wedding gift for his son Elias Hasket Derby; it is a fine example of Georgian architecture. The younger Derby became one of the wealthiest men in the United States after independence.
- Derby Wharf (1762, extended 1806) – Owned by the Derby family business, this was Salem's longest wharf (nearly 1/2 mile). When in active use, it was lined with warehouses of goods from around the world. The Derby Wharf Light (1871) remains at the end of the wharf.
- Friendship of Salem – a replica of a 1797 East Indiaman. The replica ship was built in the Scarano Brothers Shipyard in Albany, New York, in 1997. It is operated as a museum ship. The original Friendship made 15 voyages during her career: to Batavia, India, China, South America, the Caribbean, England, Germany, the Mediterranean, and Russia. She was captured as a prize of the War of 1812 by the British in September 1812.
- Hawkes House (1780, 1800) – designed by famous Salem architect Samuel McIntire, building was begun in 1780. The unfinished building was purchased and completed around 1800 by Benjamin Hawkes.
- Narbonne House (1675) – The part of the house with the high peaked roof was built by butcher Thomas Ivesl. He later added a lean-to the south side and a kitchen lean-to at the back. Around 1740 the southern lean-to was replaced by a gambrel-roofed addition that still exists. From 1750 to 1780, the house was owned by Capt. Joseph Hodges. It was purchased in 1780 by tanner Jonathan Andrew. Descendants of the Andrew family lived there from 1780 to 1964, when the house was sold to the National Park Service.
- Pedrick Store House, a three-story building, constructed around 1770, is a historic rigging and sail loft. It was relocated to the Salem Maritime National Historic Site from Marblehead, Massachusetts in 2007.
- Salem Custom House (1819) – This is the 13th Customs House in Salem; the first was built in 1649. Taxes were collected on imported cargoes. Nathaniel Hawthorne wrote about the eagle on top of the Custom House in his novel The Scarlet Letter (1850). The eagle was carved by woodcarver and cabinetmaker Joseph True. Other works of his are in the Peabody Essex Museum in Salem.
- St. Joseph Hall (1909) – Original home of The St. Joseph Society (1897), a fraternal society established by late 19th century Polish immigrants. The first floor was retail space that could be rented out to provide an income for the support of the building. The large hall on the second floor was the site of hundreds of weddings, dances, plays, and other social events in the Polish community. It increased rapidly in the late 19th-early 20th-century immigration wave. On the top floor, the Society built several apartments to house new immigrants until they could get permanently settled. The building now serves as park headquarters.
- West India Goods Store (1804) – Built by Captain Henry Prince about 1804, it was likely first used as a warehouse. Prince stored goods that he imported from the East Indies, such as pepper, coffee, water buffalo hides, and tortoise shells.

By 1836, Charles Dexter had a shop in this building. It was one of many that served Salem households by selling candles, oils, clothing, tin, and glassware. Besides stocking general groceries such as grain, cheese, dried beans and rum, the store attracted customers with many foreign imported goods and luxuries from Europe, Asia and Africa. The store continued to operate as a retail space throughout the nineteenth century. Later occupants included painters, a tobacconist, and a wine and liquor merchant.

== Gallery ==
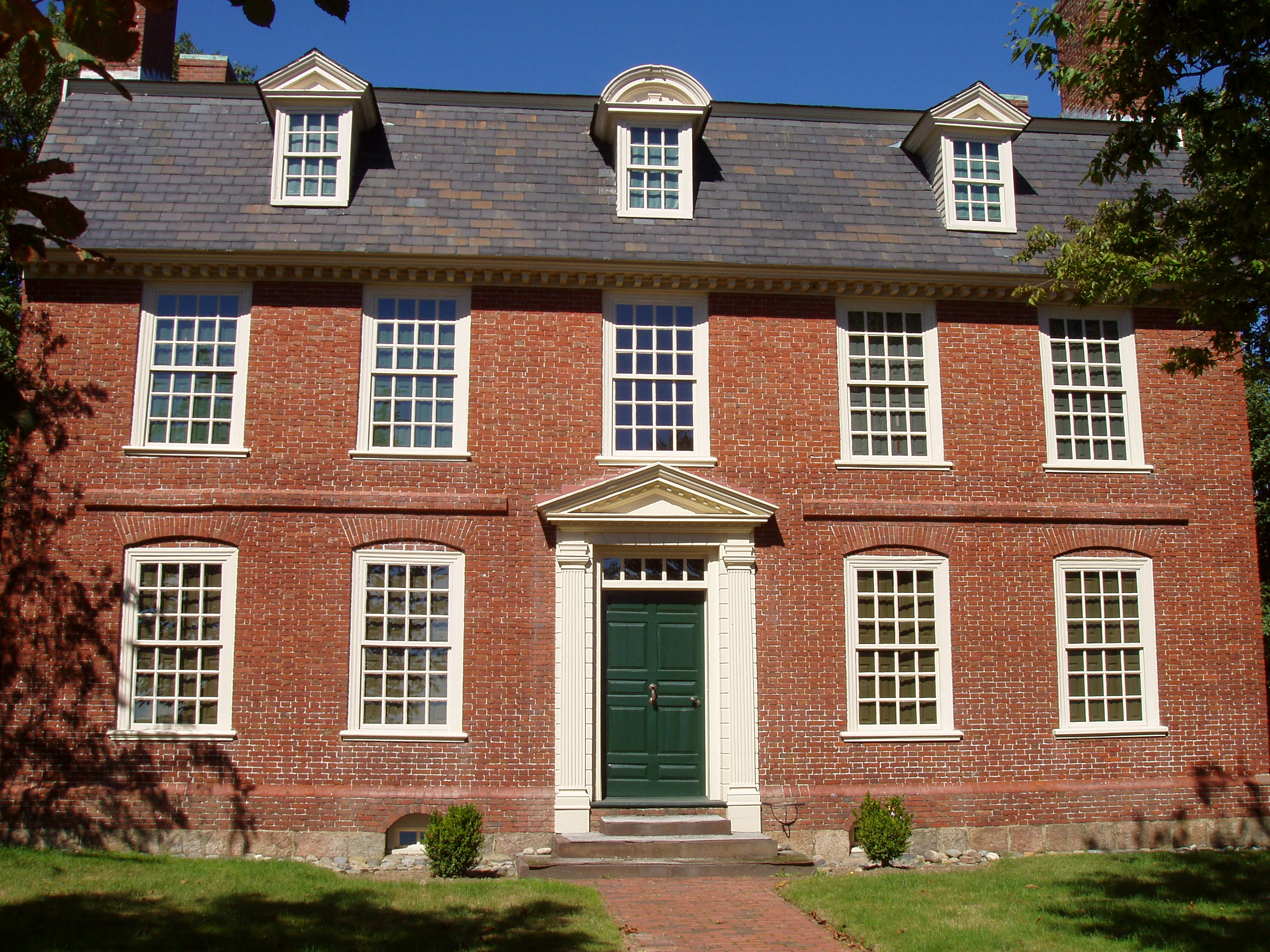
Derby House

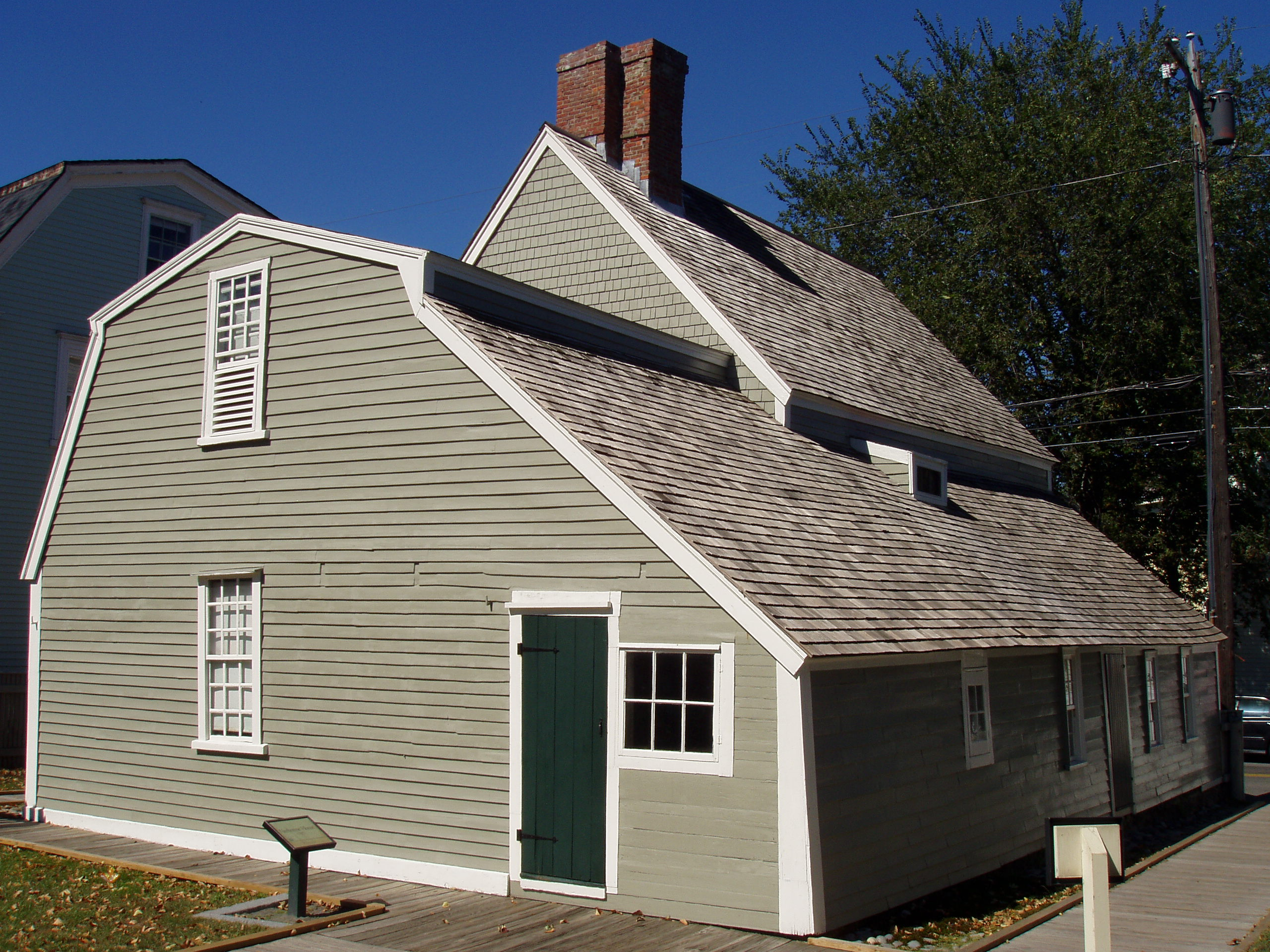
Narbonne House

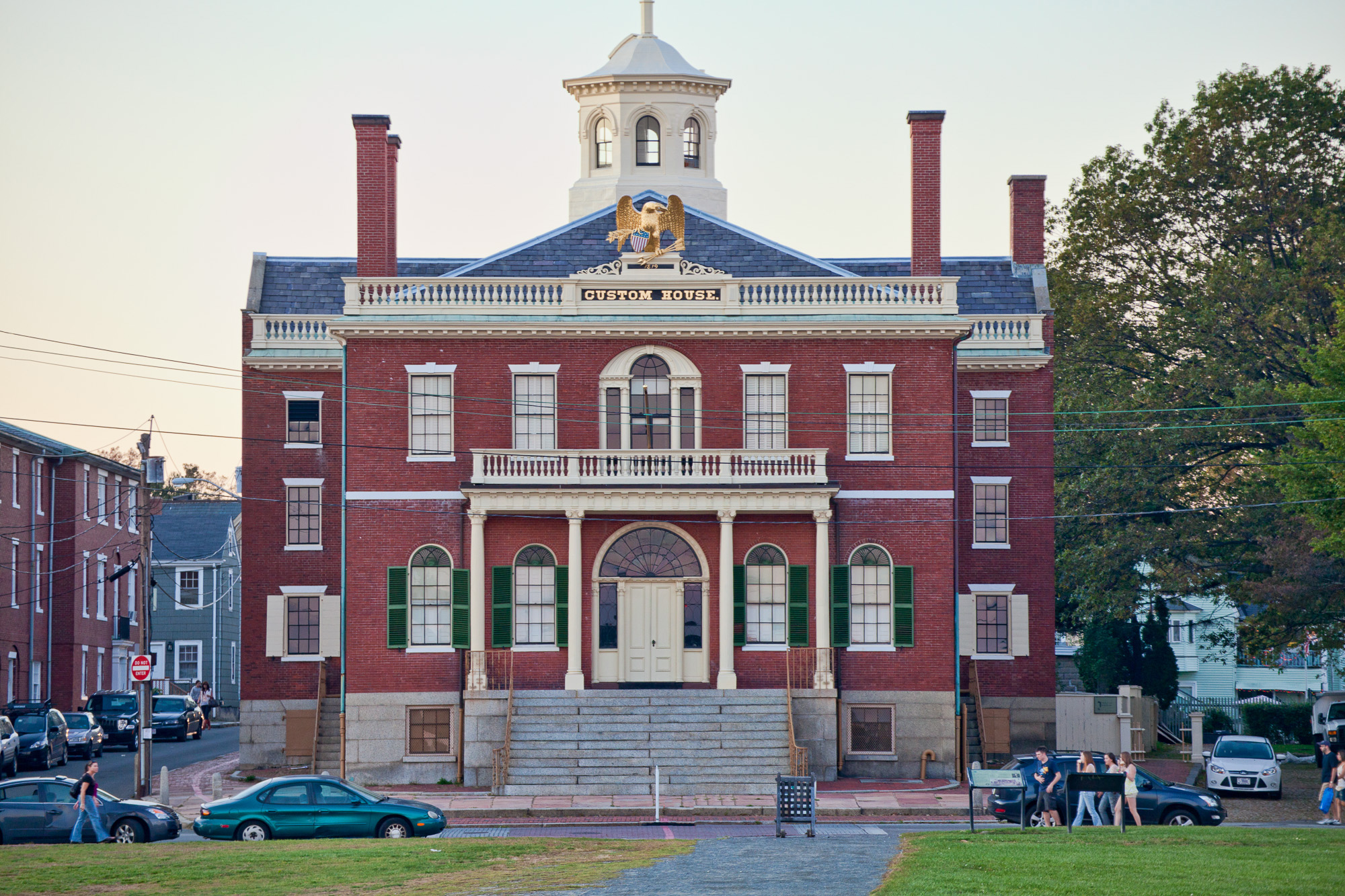
Custom House

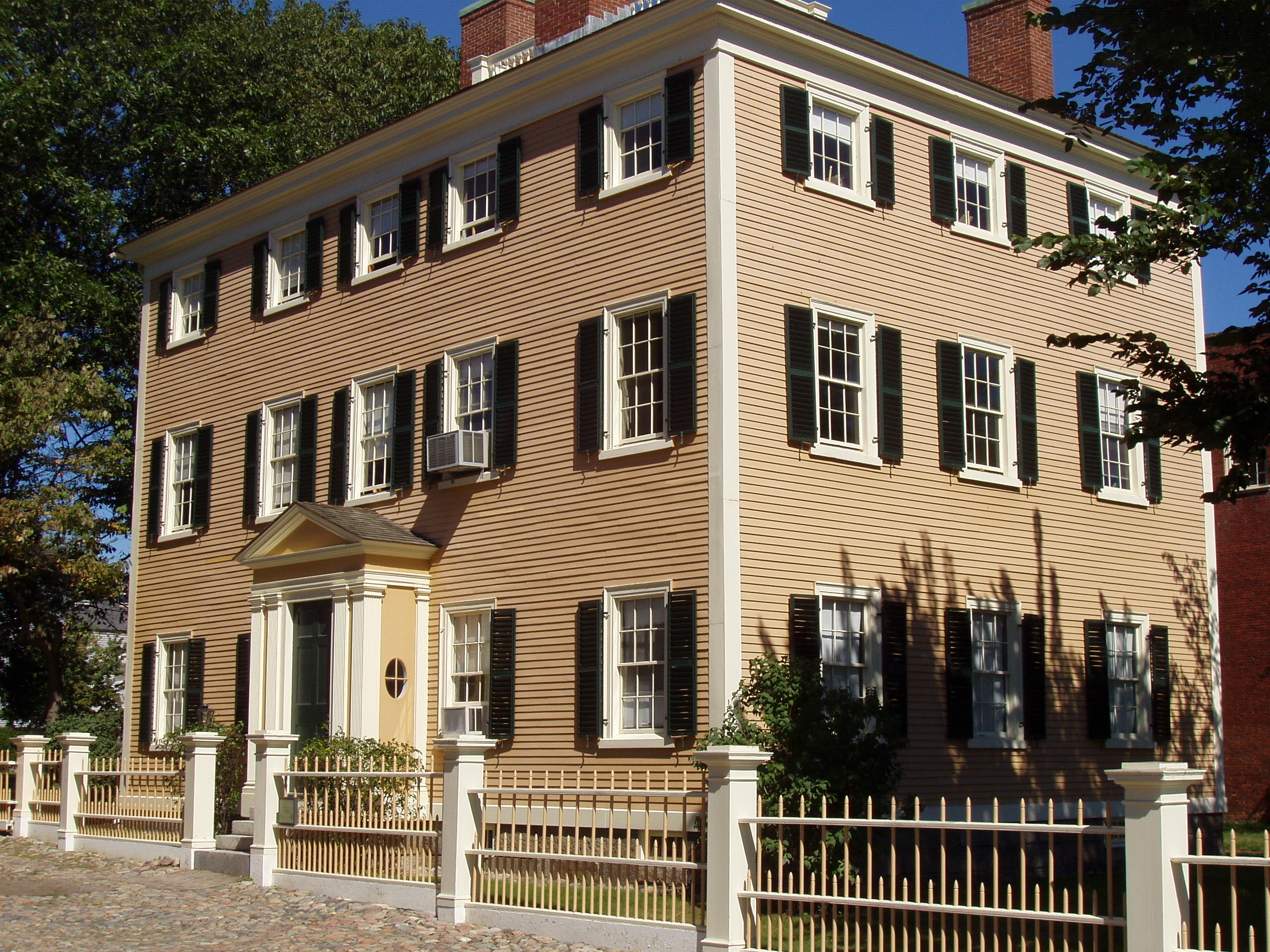
Hawkes House

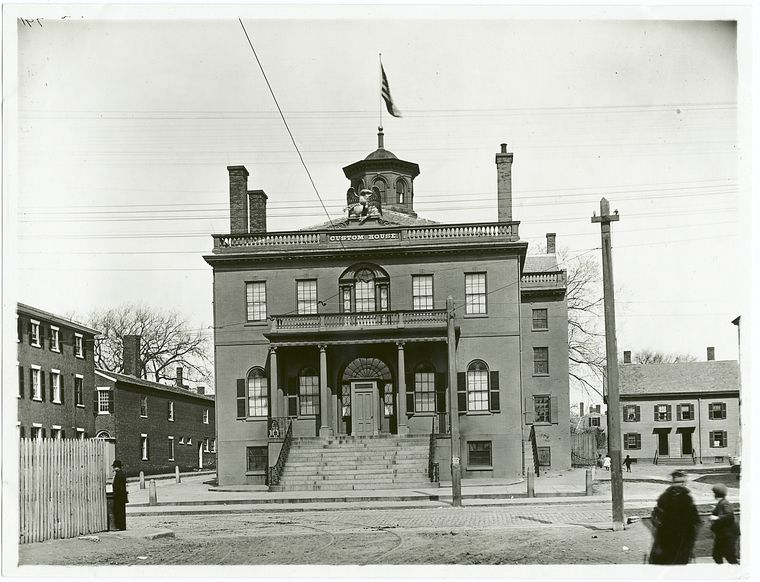
Custom House, c. 1880

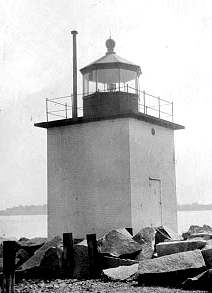
Derby Wharf Light

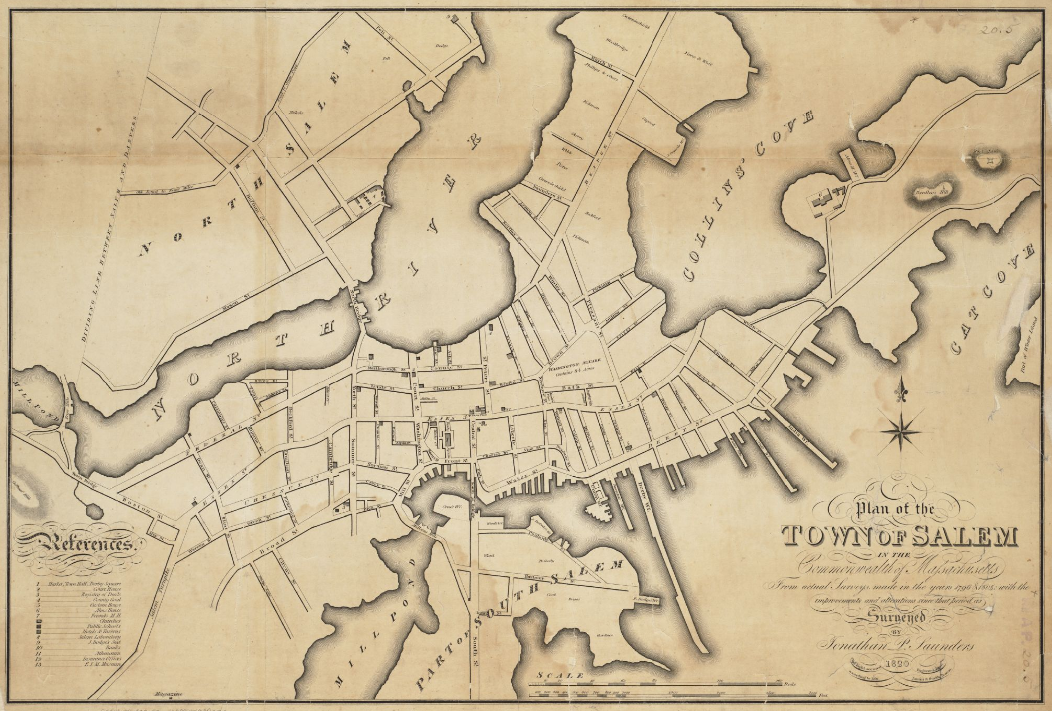
Salem - 1820

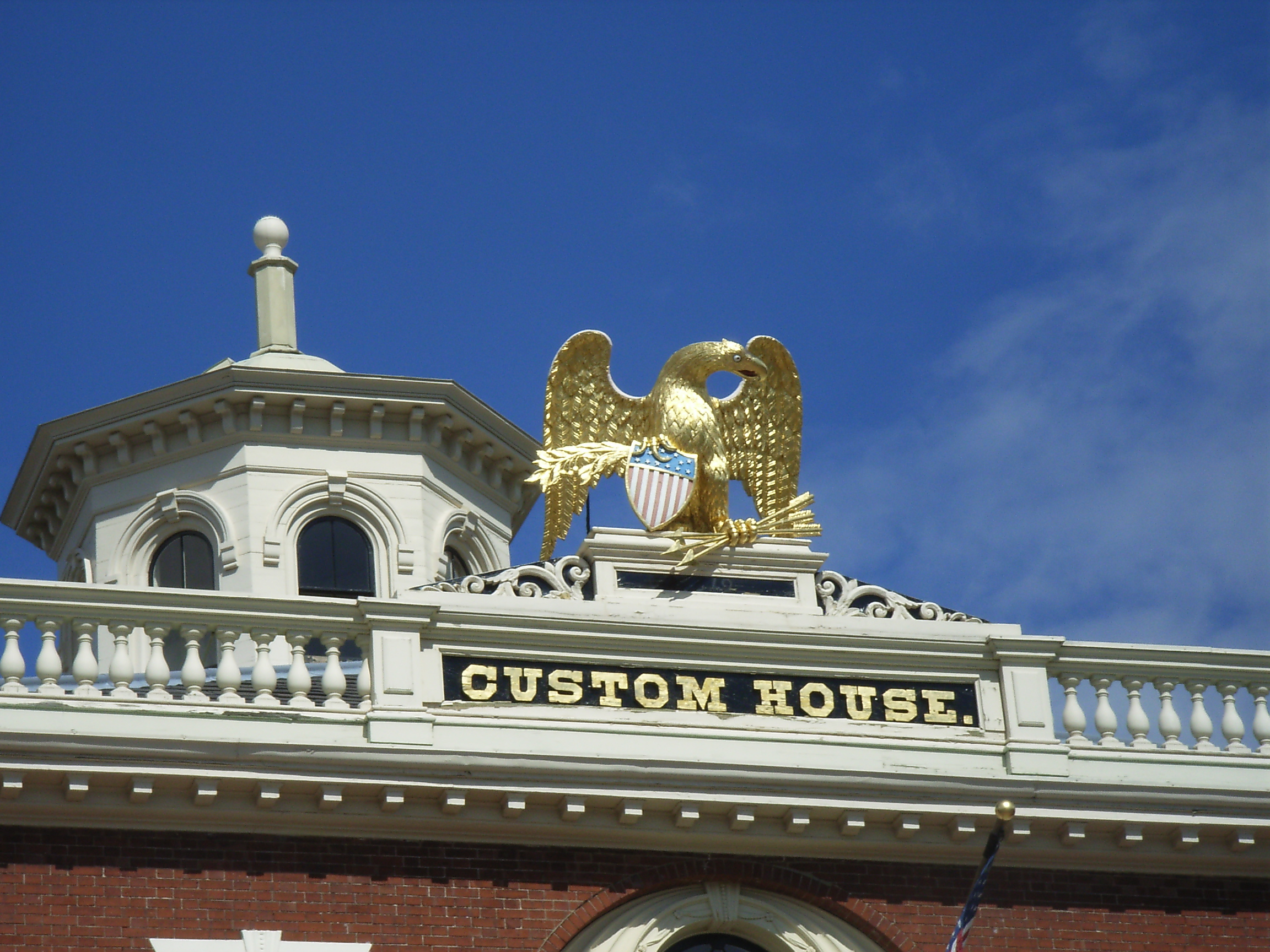
Eagle atop the Custom House

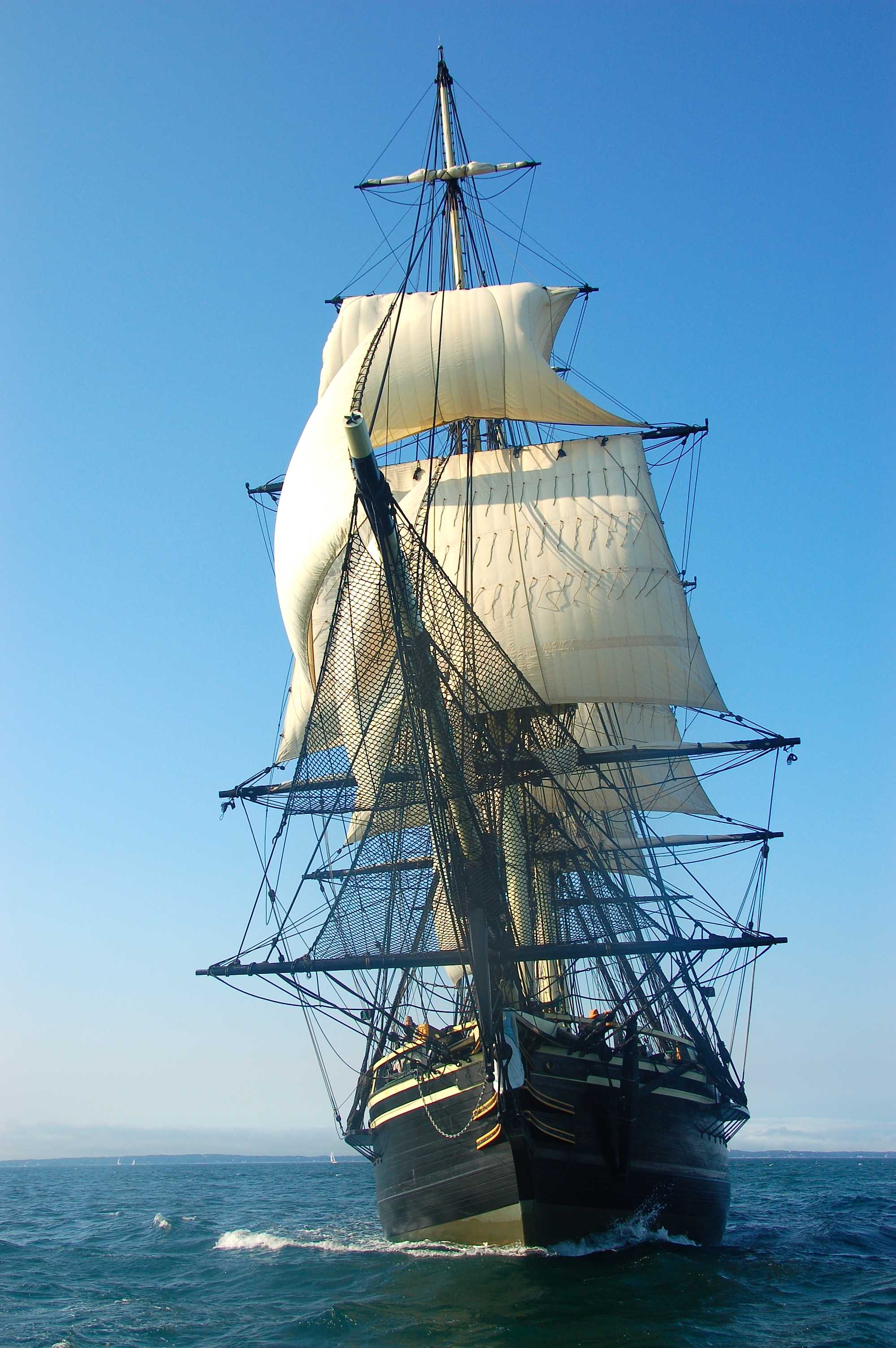
Friendship of Salem

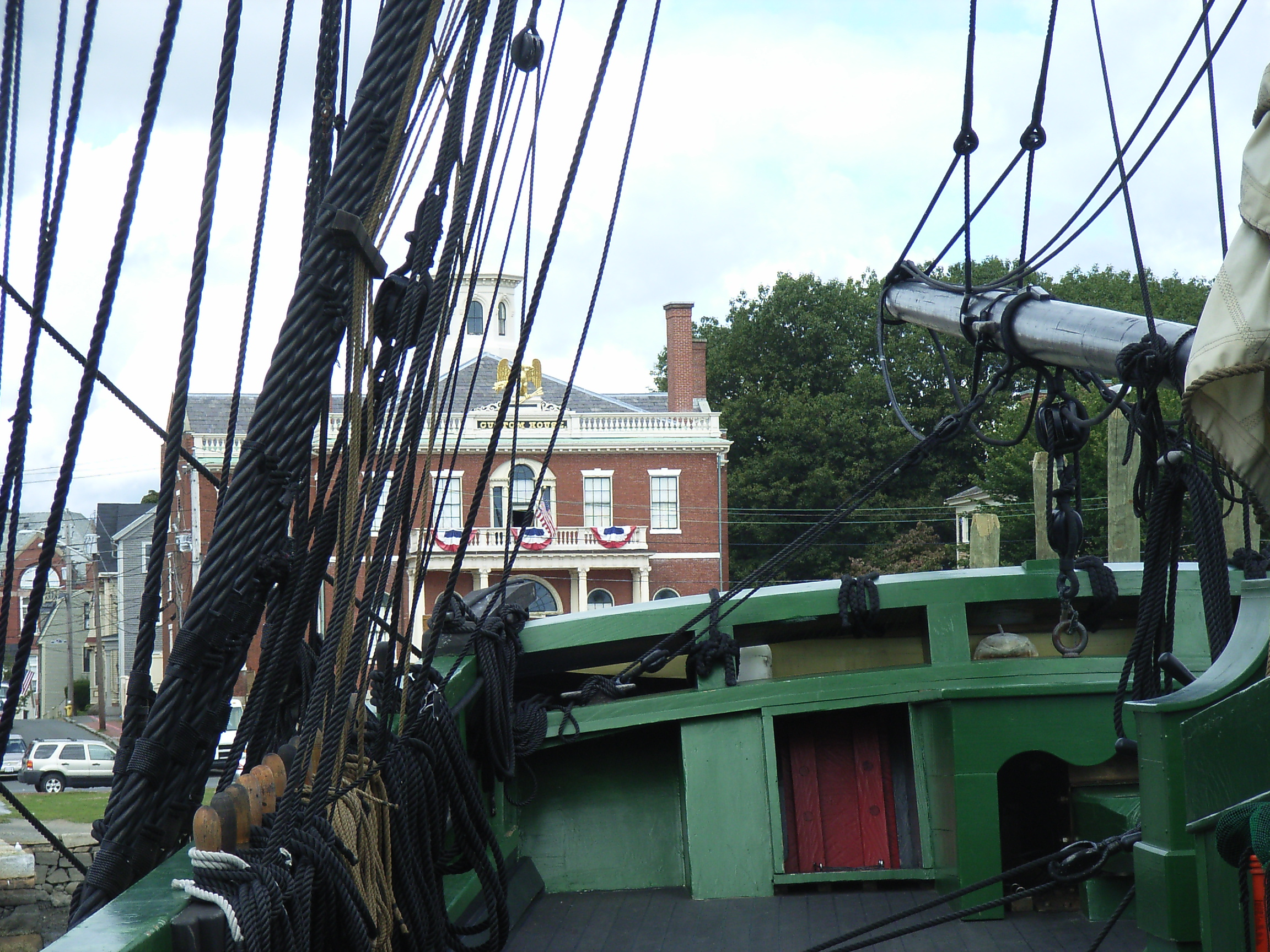
Custom House seen from the deck of the Friendship of Salem

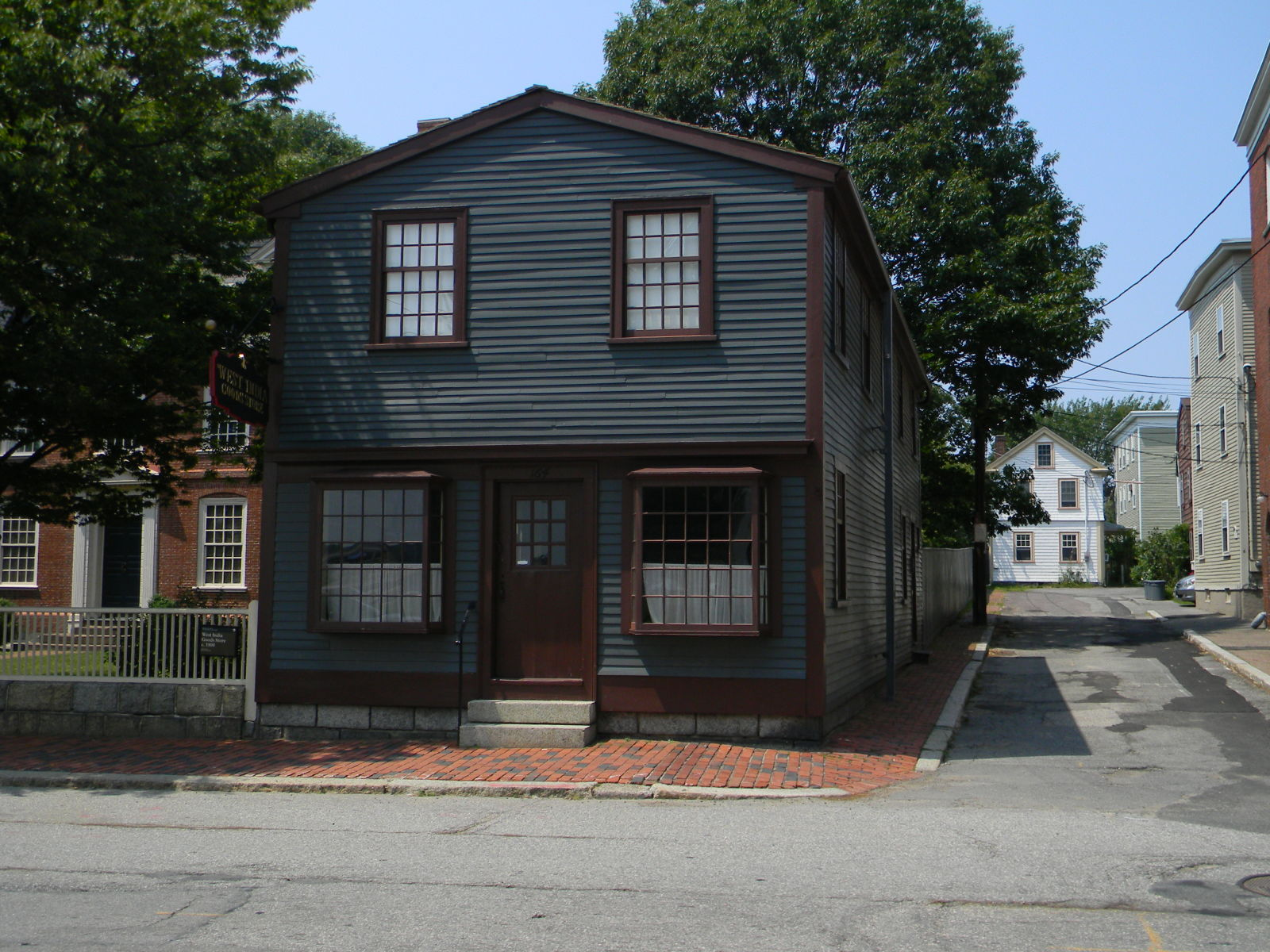
West India Goods Store, 2015

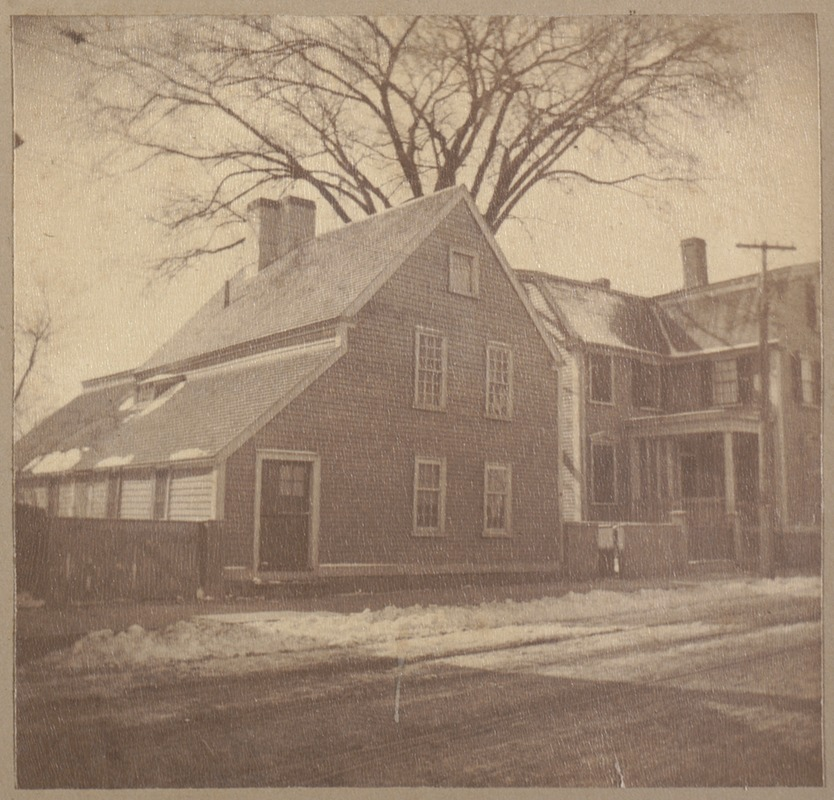
Salem, Narbonne House, built about 1680., ca. 1895-1905. Archive of Photographic Documentation of Early Massachusetts Architecture, Boston Public Library.

== Adjacent historic areas ==
A short walk from the Salem Maritime National Historical Park are the Chestnut Street District, Federal Street District, Downtown Salem District, Bridge Street Neck Historic District, Charter Street Historic District, Crombie Street District, Derby Waterfront District, Essex Institute Historic District, Salem Willows Historic District and the Salem Common Historic District.

== See also ==
Salem Maritime National Historic Site is managed by the National Park Service, which also administers U.S. national parks. The agency was created on August 25, 1916, by Congress through the National Park Service Organic Act.

- List of maritime museums in the United States
- List of museum ships of the United States military
- National Register of Historic Places listings in Salem, Massachusetts
- National Register of Historic Places listings in Essex County, Massachusetts
- List of lighthouses in the United States § Massachusetts
- List of the oldest buildings in Massachusetts
- List of historic houses in Massachusetts
- List of the oldest buildings in the United States
