= Salem, Dufferin County, Ontario =

Salem
- Dispersed Rural Community
- Location in southern Ontario
- Coordinates: 43°57′23″N 80°03′17″W
- Country: Canada
- Province: Ontario
- County: Dufferin
- Municipality: Mono
- Elevation: 423 m (1,388 ft)
- Time zone: UTC-5 (Eastern Time Zone)
  - Summer (DST): UTC-4 (Eastern Time Zone)
- Postal Code FSA: L9W
- Area codes: 519, 226, 548

Salem is a Dispersed Rural Community and unincorporated place in the municipality of Mono, Dufferin County in southwestern Ontario, Canada. The community is located at the intersection of 2nd Line EHS and Sideroad 5, 5.3 kilometres (3.3 mi) northeast of the town of Orangeville.
