= Hockley Valley Provincial Nature Reserve =

Nature reserve at Mono, Ontario, Canada

- IUCN category Ia (strict nature reserve)
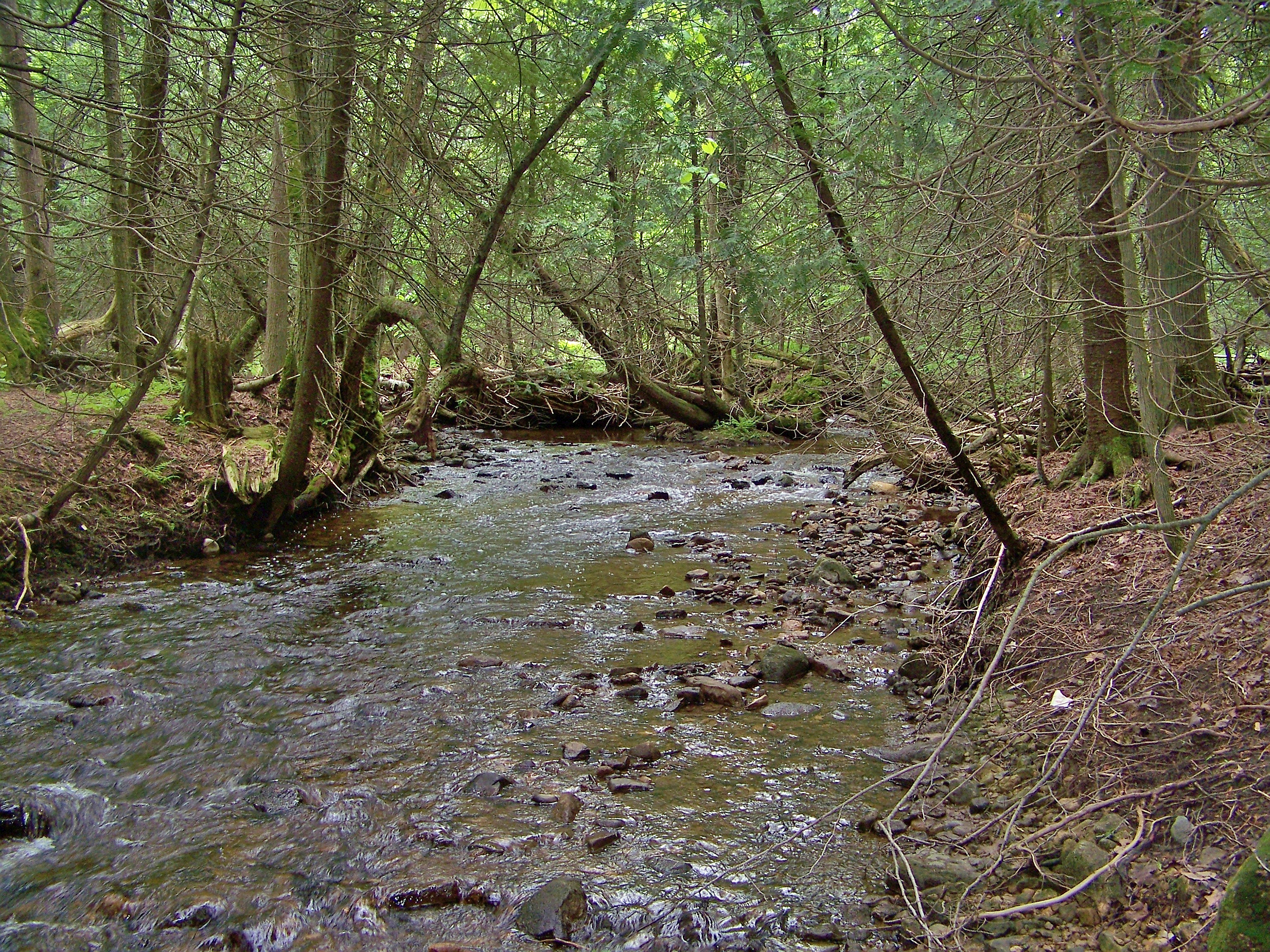
- A Nottawasaga River tributary within the reserve.

- Location within Southern Ontario
- Interactive map of Hockley Valley Provincial Nature Reserve
- Location: Ontario, Canada
- Nearest city: Mono
- Coordinates: 43°59′6″N 80°3′44″W
- Area: 3.78 km^{2} (1.46 sq mi)
- Established: 1989
- Governing body: Ontario Parks
- Website: www.ontarioparks.com/park/hockleyvalley

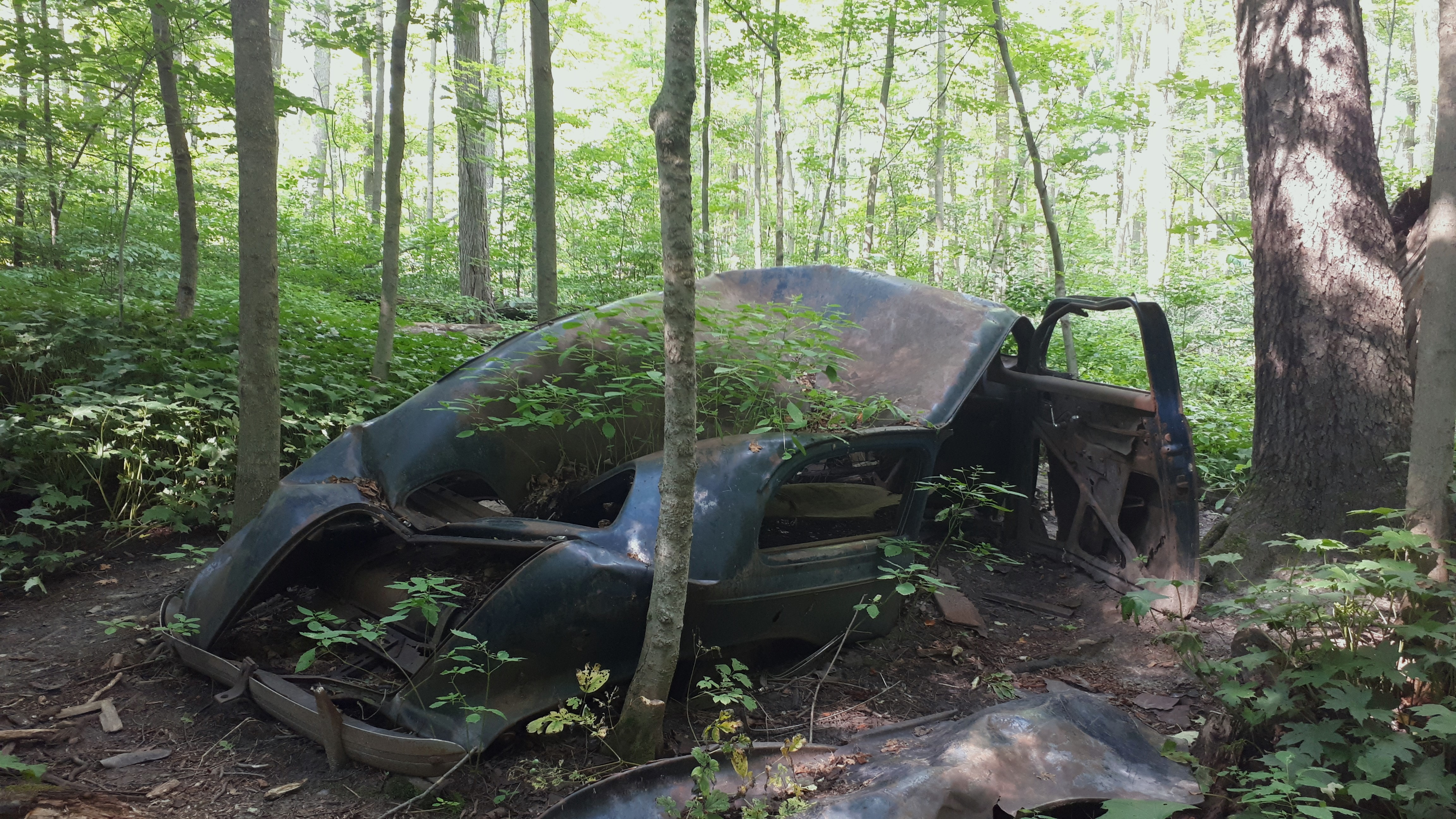
The remains of a 1939 Chevy Sedan on the Main Bruce Trail

Hockley Valley Provincial Nature Reserve is a nature reserve located on the Niagara Escarpment within the township of Mono, Ontario, Canada. It is managed by Ontario Parks. Approximately 80% of the Cannings Falls Area of Natural and Scientific Interest is within the borders of the park; land acquisitions are planned to encompass it entirely. The Bruce Trail links the reserve to other protected areas of the Niagara Escarpment.

== Landform ==
The topography of the area was greatly influenced by glacial processes, followed by fluvial erosion. The reserve is characterized by a till moraine and other glacial features, such as kames and kettles. A deeply cut tributary valley to the Nottawasaga River bisects the reserve through its centre. The Niagara Escarpment's dolomite caprock (the Amabel Formation) can be seen in the upper parts of the gorge; rapids and waterfalls expose stratigraphic succession down to the Queenston Shale.

== Flora and fauna ==
Within the reserve, 417 species of vascular plants, many of which are rare, have been identified. This includes the regionally rare cuckoo flower and the sand violet, as well as the nationally endangered butternut, population of which has dwindled due to the butternut canker disease. Fauna includes the locally rare northern long-eared bat, the nationally vulnerable Louisiana waterthrush and the northern brook lamprey, as well as the nationally threatened Jefferson salamander.

== Activities ==
Recreation in the park is limited. Due to the park's designation as a nature reserve, permitted activities are limited to hiking, and snowshoeing; no visitor facilities are present or planned.
