= South Salem =

South Salem is the name of several places in the United States:

- South Salem, Indiana
- Salem South (state assembly constituency), Tamil Nadu, India
- South Salem Township, Kansas
- South Salem, New York, a hamlet in Westchester County
- South Salem, Ohio, a village in Ross County
