= Salem Independent Chapel, Llandovery =

Church in Carmarthenshire, Wales

Coordinates: 51°59′41″N 3°47′37″W

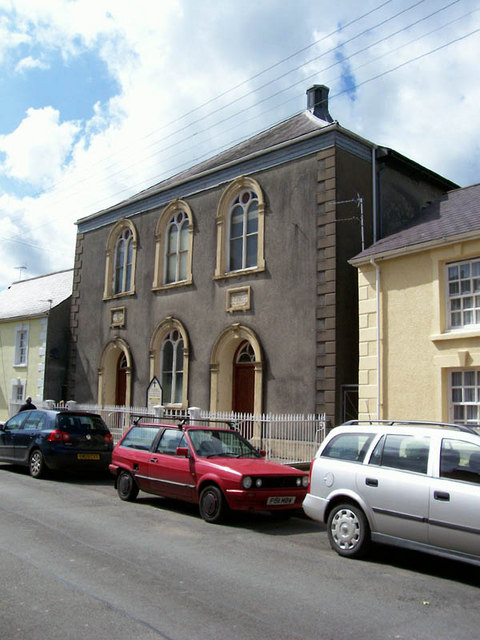
- Salem Independent Chapel, Llandovery
- Location: Orchard Street, Llandovery
- Country: Wales
- Denomination: Independent chapel

History
- Founded: 1836

Architecture
- Heritage designation: Grade II
- Designated: 26 February 1981
- Architectural type: Chapel

Salem Independent Chapel is an Independent chapel in the town of Llandovery, Carmarthenshire, Wales. The present building dates from between 1829 and 1830 and is located at Orchard Street, Llandovery. It was designated as a Grade II listed building on 26 February 1981.

Salem Independent Chapel was built between 1829 and 1830 and underwent considerable alterations in the 1870s. The two-storey facade has a raised plinth and quoins, three bays and a pyramidal hipped roof with a truncated front edge. The windows are pilastered and have arched surrounds. There are three windows on the upper storey while the lower storey has a central window and two doors on either side. The interior of the chapel is rectangular in plan and has a single gallery with pilasters dividing up the long panels. This and the pulpit, with its sweeping stair, date to about 1870 and are in the style of the architect Thomas Thomas. The organ gallery dates from 1937, the organ being by the organ-makers Conacher.

Salem Independent Chapel was designated as a Grade II listed building on 26 February 1981, being a fine example of "a substantial pyramid-roofed chapel of 1829 with external and internal detail of 1870s". The Royal Commission on the Ancient and Historical Monuments of Wales curates the archaeological, architectural and historic records for this chapel. These include digital photographs, a collection of old postcards, a Victorian Society South Wales Group Tour Guide and a descriptive account by A.J. Parkinson, dated 18 March 1994.
