= Salem Airport =

Salem Airport may refer to:

- Salem Airport (Arkansas) in Salem, Arkansas, United States (FAA: 7M9)
- Salem Airport (India) in Tamil Nadu, India (IATA: SXV)
- Salem Airpark in Salem, Ohio, United States (FAA: 38D)
- Salem-Leckrone Airport in Salem, Illinois, United States (FAA/IATA: SLO)
- Salem Memorial Airport in Salem, Missouri, United States (FAA: K33)

Salem Municipal Airport may refer to:

- Salem Municipal Airport (Indiana) in Salem, Indiana, United States (FAA: I83)
- Salem Municipal Airport (Oregon), also known as McNary Field, in Salem, Oregon, United States (FAA/IATA: SLE)

Airports in places named Salem:

- Koons Airport in Salem, Ohio, United States (FAA: 8G8)
