= USS Salem =

Three ships of the United States Navy have been named USS Salem:

- USS Salem (CL-3) was a scout cruiser in service from 1908 to 1921
- USS Salem (CM-11) was the civilian vessel Joseph R. Parrott, used as a minelayer from 1942 to 1945
- USS Salem (CA-139) is a heavy cruiser and museum ship in service from 1949 to 1959
