= Salem Creek =

Salem Creek may refer to:

- Salem Creek (Missouri), a stream
- Salem Creek (Richardson Creek tributary), a stream in Union County, North Carolina
- Salem Creek (Ontario)
- Salem Creek (Pennsylvania), a tributary of the Susquehanna River
