= Gardner–Pingree House =

Historic house in Massachusetts, United States

- U.S. National Register of Historic Places
- U.S. National Historic Landmark
- U.S. Historic district – Contributing property
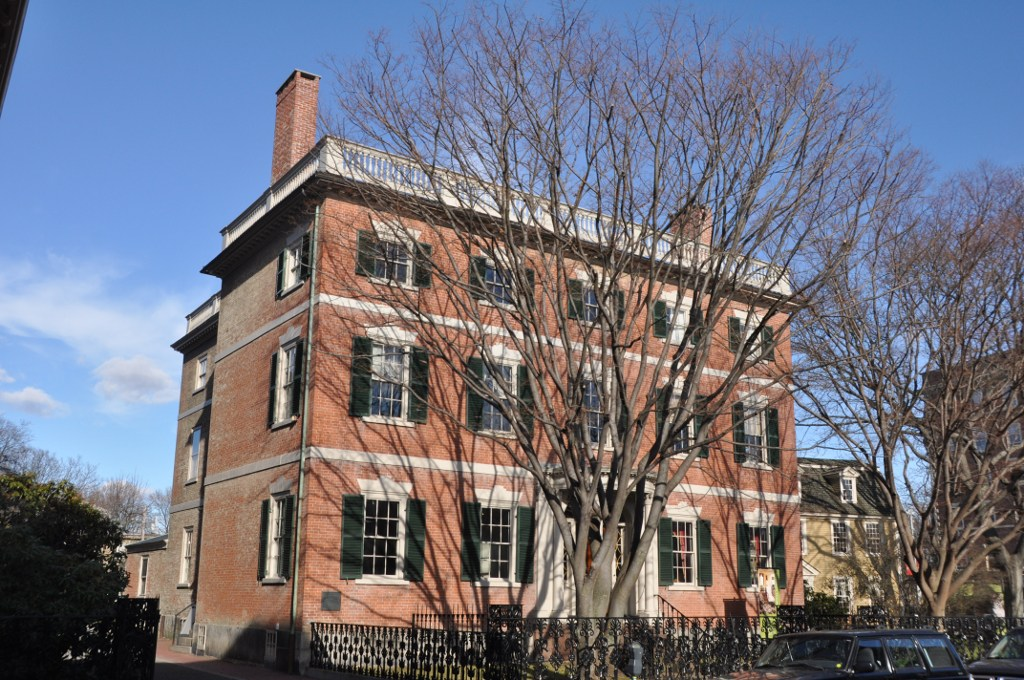

- Location within Massachusetts Location within the United States
- Location: Salem, Massachusetts
- Coordinates: 42°31′21″N 70°53′31″W
- Area: less than one acre
- Built: 1804
- Architect: Samuel McIntire
- Architectural style: Federal
- Part of: Essex Institute Historic District (#72000147); Salem Common Historic District (#76000303)
- NRHP reference No.: 70000541

Significant dates
- Added to NRHP: December 30, 1970
- Designated CP: June 22, 1972; May 12, 1976

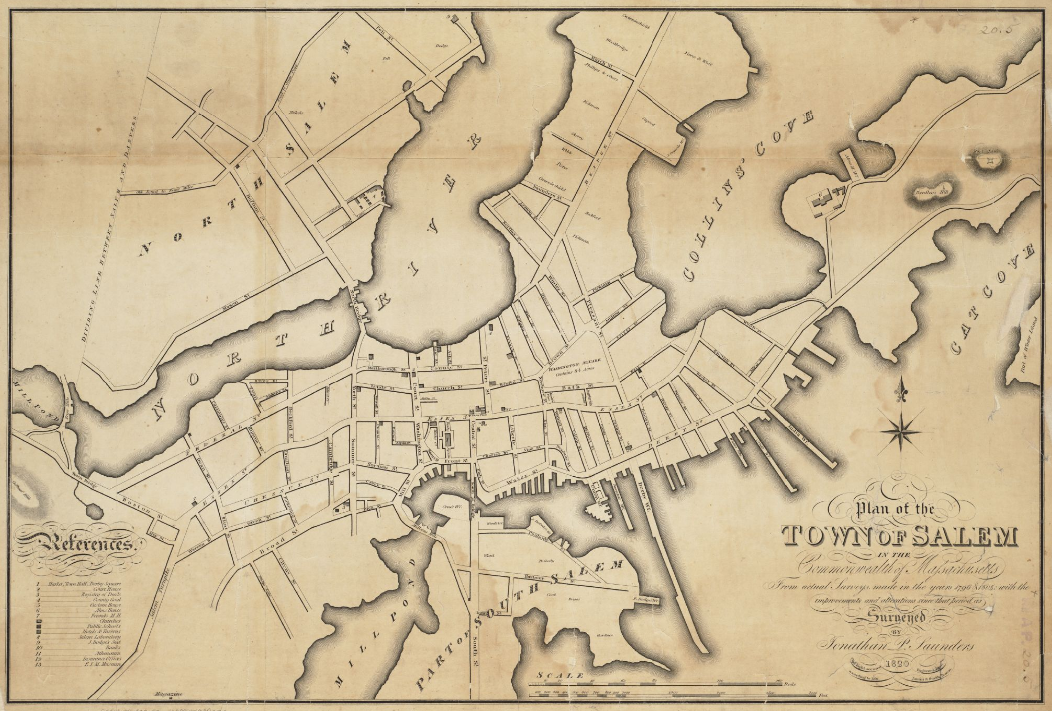
Salem, 1820

The Gardner–Pingree House is a historic house museum at 128 Essex Street in Salem, Massachusetts. It is judged to be a masterpiece of Federal architecture by the noted Salem builder Samuel McIntire, and was designated a National Historic Landmark in 1972 for its architectural significance. It is owned by the Peabody Essex Museum as part of its architectural collection.

== Description ==
The house is a three-story brick structure, rectangular in shape, with a three-story ell extending the rear. The brick is laid in Flemish bond, and the trim is white marble. The roof is surrounded by a low balustrade above a modillioned cornice, and is pierced by two interior brick chimneys. There are marble trim bands separating the floors, and the third floor windows are shortened. All windows have black shutters, and are topped by lintels with a keystone. The main entrance is sheltered by an elliptical portico supported by four Corinthian columns. The doorway is framed by sidelight windows and an elliptical fanlight, with pilasters rising to the base of the portico top. The house interior features lavishly carved woodwork in the public spaces on the first floor, including fireplace mantels, cornices, internal window shutters, and the stairway balustrades.

== History ==
The house was built in 1804 by Samuel McIntire in a Federal style for John and Sarah (West) Gardner. John bought the lot from his father (John Gardner, Sr) whose cousin (John Gardner III) was the grandfather of John Lowell Gardner I. John and Sarah sold the house to her brother, Nathaniel West, to cover shipping losses related to events leading up to the War of 1812. The house was sold, in 1814, to Capt. Joseph White. David Pingree bought the house in 1834. In 1933 descendants of David Pingree gave the house to the Essex Institute, which merged with the Peabody Museum of Salem to form the Peabody Essex Museum.

The house was the site of the notorious 1830 murder of Captain Joseph White, whose death prompted a famous trial prosecuted by Daniel Webster. The trial inspired Edgar Allan Poe and Nathaniel Hawthorne.

The house was one of the filming locations for the 1979 Merchant Ivory film adaptation of Henry James' novel The Europeans.

The house was listed on the National Register of Historic Places in 1970, and is a contributing property to both the Essex Institute Historic District and the Salem Common Historic District.

== See also ==
- List of historic houses in Massachusetts
- List of National Historic Landmarks in Massachusetts
- National Register of Historic Places listings in Salem, Massachusetts
- National Register of Historic Places listings in Essex County, Massachusetts
