= Crowninshield–Bentley House =

Colonial house in the Georgian style in Salem, Massachusetts

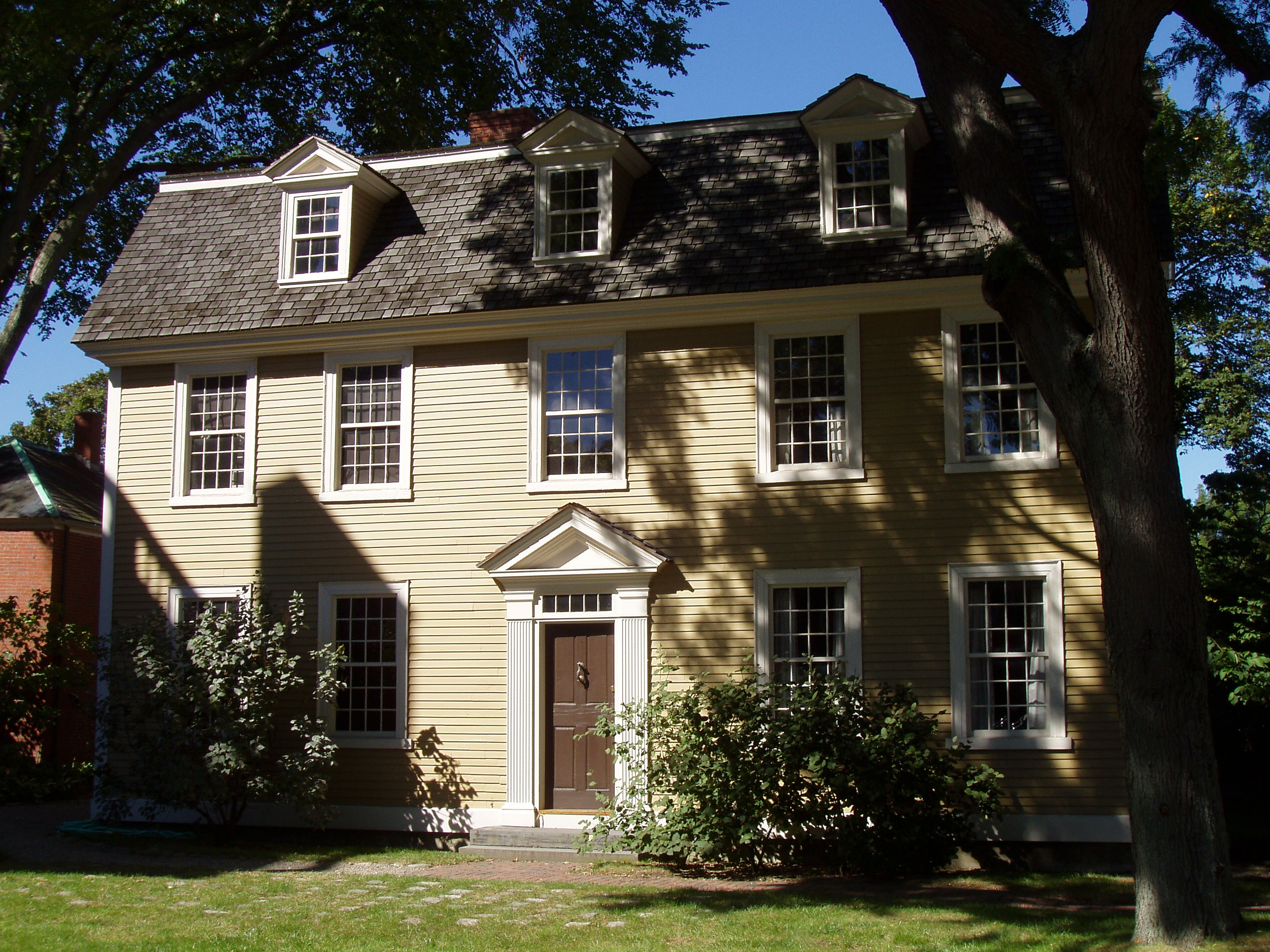
The Crowninshield–Bentley House, Salem, Massachusetts.

The Crowninshield–Bentley House (circa 1727–1730) is a Colonial house in the Georgian style, located at 126 Essex Street, Salem, Massachusetts in the Essex Institute Historic District. It is now owned by the Peabody Essex Museum and open for public tours from June to October.

The house was originally built for sea captain John Crowninshield at a site on 106 Essex Street. It is a symmetrical five-bay structure, clapboarded, two stories tall, with three small dormers through the roof, and a central entry door. Compare it with the architecture of the Ropes Mansion and the Peirce-Nichols House, also in Salem, and also owned by the Peabody Essex Museum. Some believe it may have started as a "half house" on the east side, and been expanded in 1761 and again in 1794. The building was moved to its present location in 1959–1960, at which time it was restored.

Four generations of Crowninshields lived in the house until 1832. Its main historical interest centers upon Reverend William Bentley, a boarder from 1791 to 1819.

It has been suggested (by whom?) that this house may be the model for "the old Crowninshield house" mentioned in the H. P. Lovecraft story "The Thing on the Doorstep"

== See also ==
- List of historic houses in Massachusetts

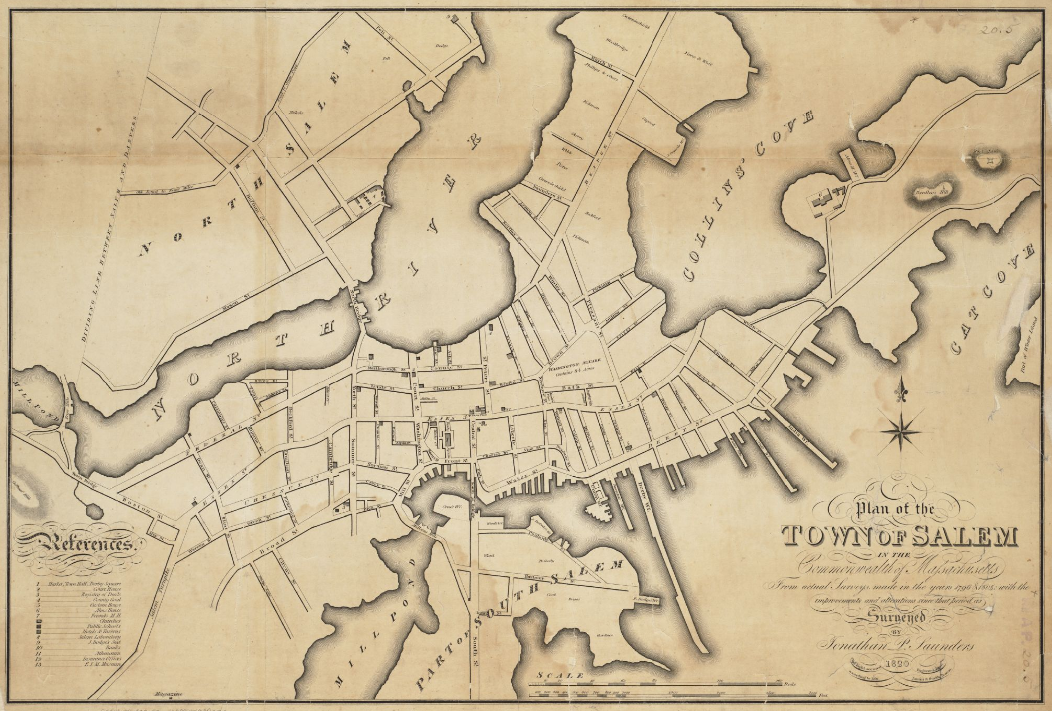
Salem, 1820
