= Charles Osgood (disambiguation) =

Charles Osgood (1933–2024) was an American writer and commentator.

Charles Osgood may also refer to:

- Charles E. Osgood (1916–1991), American psychologist
- Charles Osgood (artist) (1809–1890), American painter
- Charlie Osgood (1926–2014), Major League Baseball pitcher
