= Salem Common Historic District (Salem, Massachusetts) =

Historic district in Massachusetts, United States

- U.S. National Register of Historic Places
- U.S. Historic district
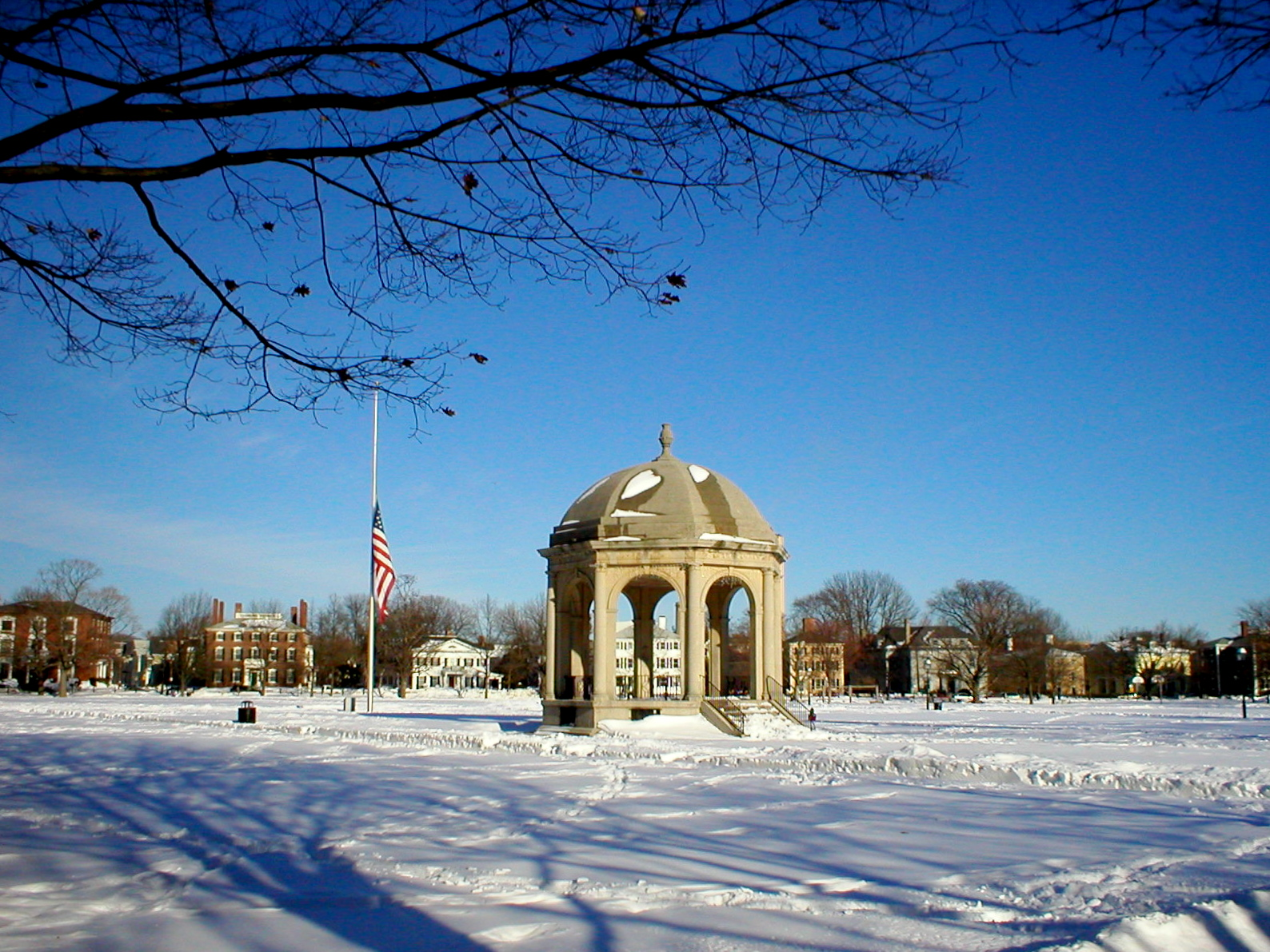
- Wintertime view of historic homes

- Location within Massachusetts Location within the United States
- Location: Salem, Massachusetts, U.S.
- Coordinates: 42°31′22″N 70°53′28″W
- Built: c. 1667
- Architectural style: Colonial Revival, Late Victorian, Federal
- NRHP reference No.: 76000303 (original); 02000694 (increase)

Significant dates
- Added to NRHP: May 12, 1976
- Boundary increase: June 27, 2002

Salem Common Historic District is a historic district bounded roughly by Bridge, Derby, and St. Peter's streets, as well as Collins Cove in Salem, Massachusetts, United States.

The Common was established in 1667, and during this period it was partially a swamp. Until 1802, there was no enclosing fence, allowing livestock to freely roam across it. In 1802 a subscription was put forth to beautify the park. The current wrought iron fence around the Common was built in 1850 and has undergone restoration.

The white archway that stands near the north entrance was originally a design by Samuel McIntire, but it had to be removed because of its condition. The current archway is a replica of the original that was made in 1976.

The district was added to the National Register of Historic Places on May 12, 1976, and further expanded on June 27, 2002. The district boundaries include the Essex Institute Historic District, a cluster of buildings along Essex and Brown streets owned by the Peabody Essex Museum.

== Joseph Story House ==
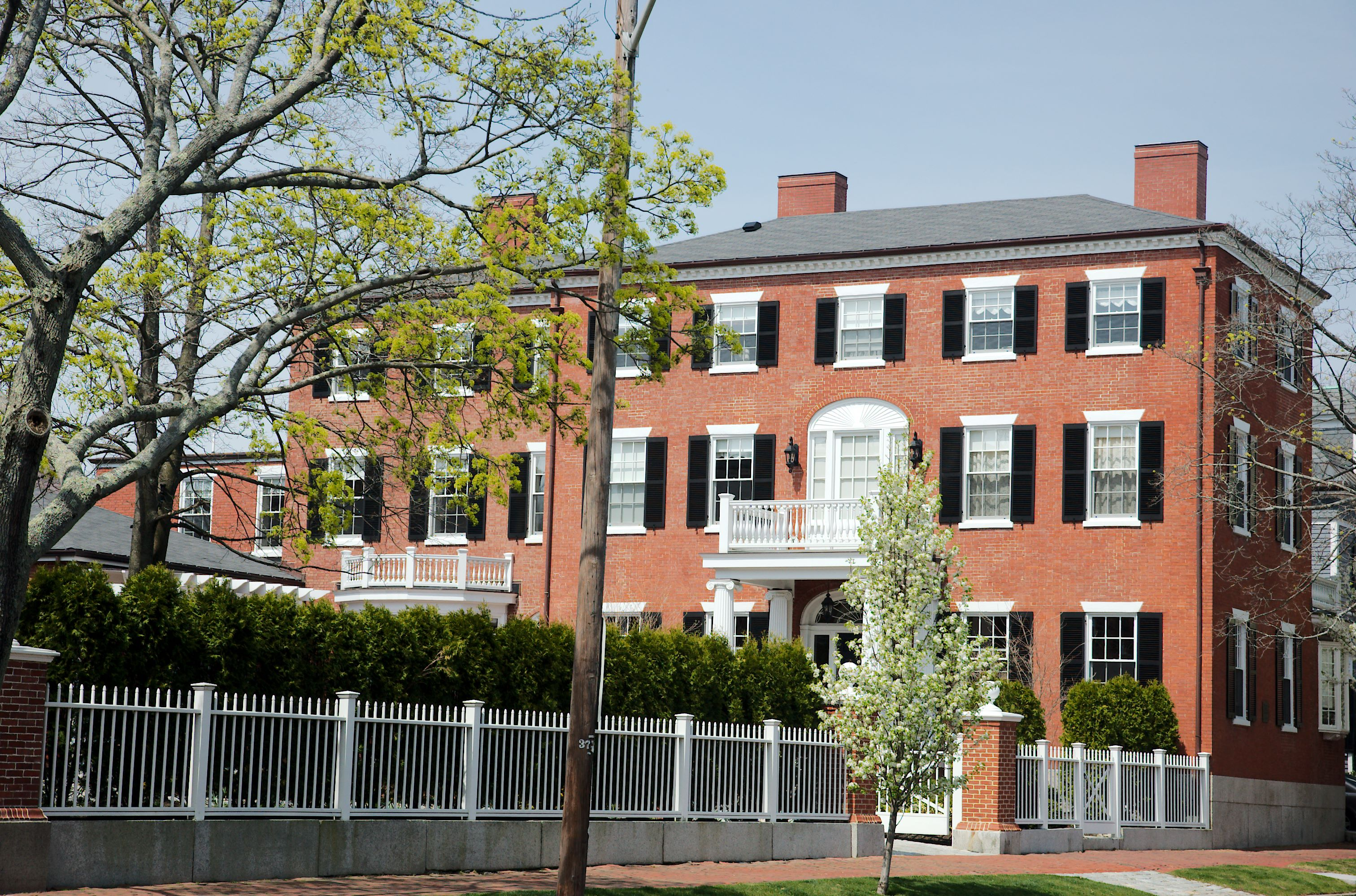
Joseph Story House

The Joseph Story House was built in 1811 for U.S. Supreme Court Justice Joseph Story. The house is located at 26 Winter Street and was added to the National Register of Historic Places in 1973.

== Andrew-Safford House ==
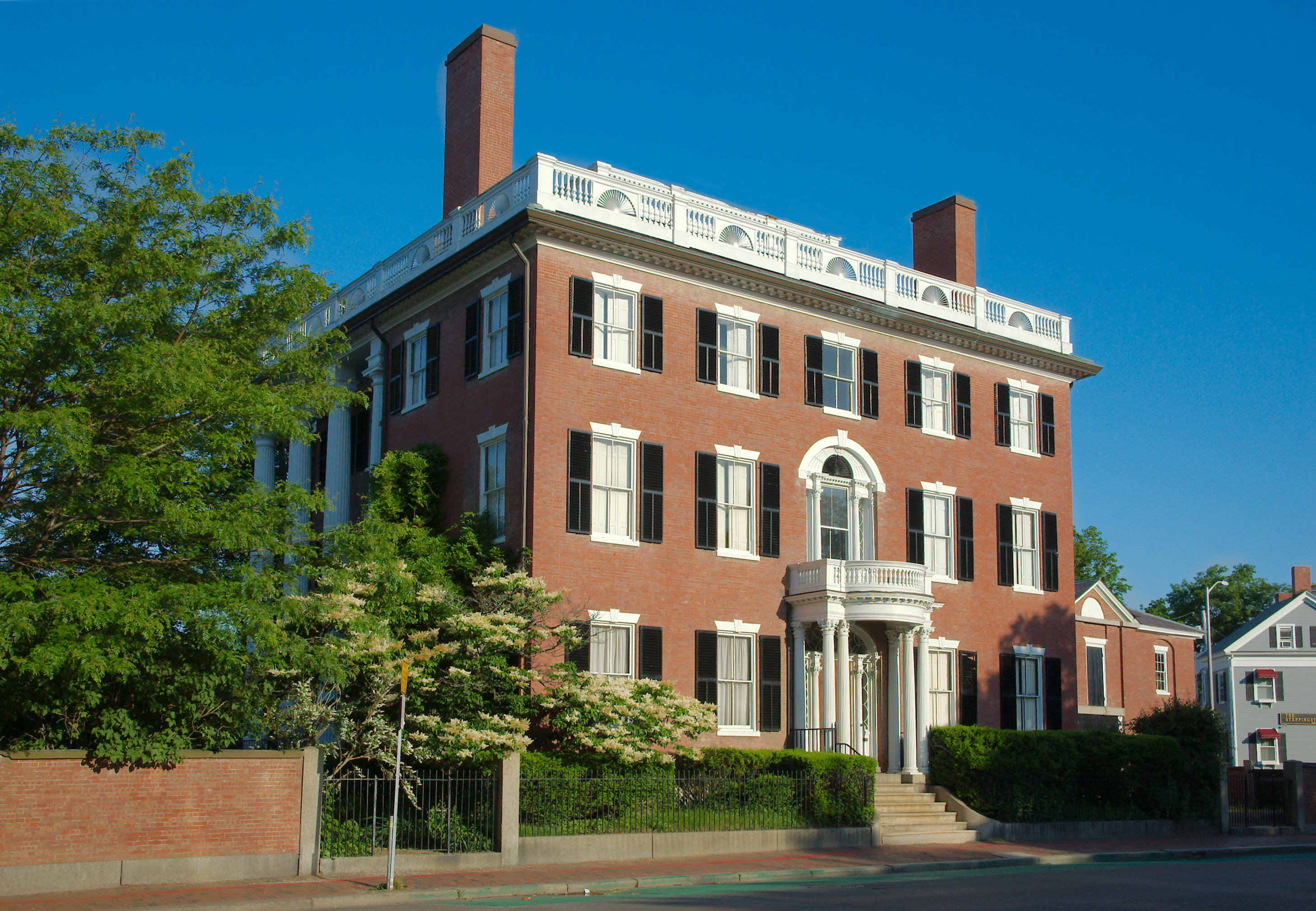
The Andrew-Safford House

The Andrew–Safford House was built in 1819 and was designed in the Federal style by an unknown architect for a wealthy Russian fur merchant. It is located at 13 Washington Square and is owned by the Peabody Essex Museum.

When under construction it was reputed to have been the most expensive house erected in the United States at the time. The massive vertical façade and the four large columns rising from the ground to the third story on the south side makes this one of the most impressive houses in Salem.

In addition to being listed in this district, the house is also part of the Essex Institute Historic District.

Andrew worked with Samuel Archer III to create the first commercial block on the location of the Hawthorne Hotel that has been known as Wakefied Place, Andrew's Corner, and the Franklin Building.

== John Bertram House ==
The John Bertram House was originally built for John Forrester in 1819. Forrester had married one of Joseph Story's sisters. Captain John Bertram purchased the Federal mansion from John Forrester and later sold it to Col. George Peabody.

Col. George Peabody lived in the mansion for about 60 years and while there he made the mansion larger by the addition of a one-story dining room.

Around 1930, the home was purchased by the estate of Captain John Bertram, and is now called the John Bertram House. It is currently a home for the elderly.

== Salem as the Birthplace of the National Guard ==
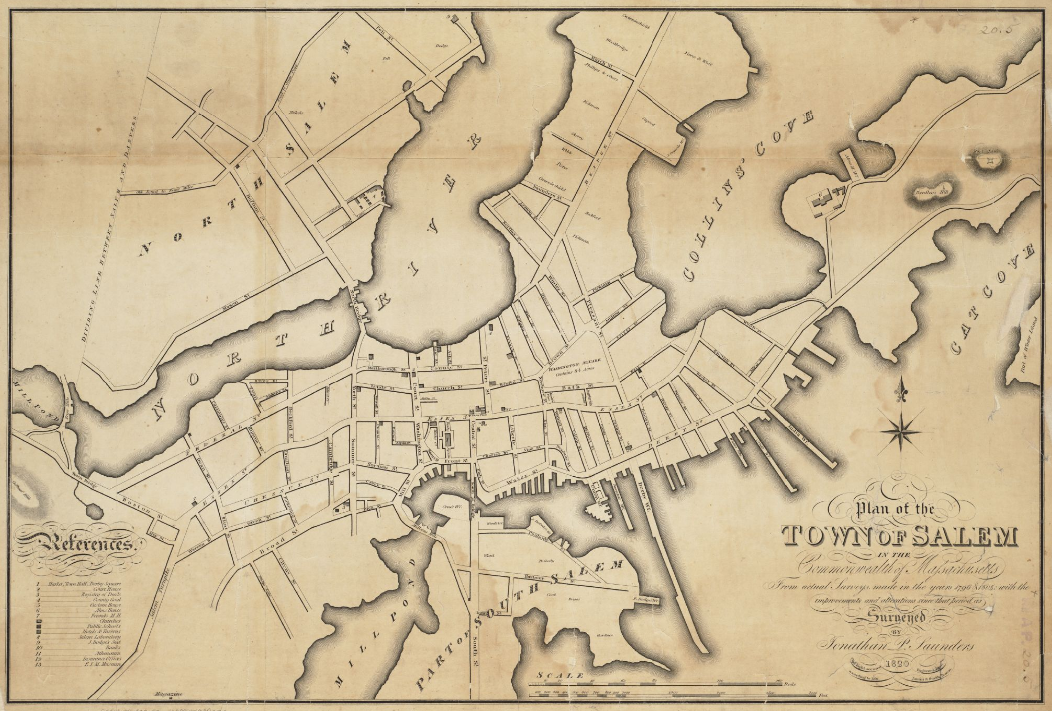
Map of Salem, Massachusetts in 1820.

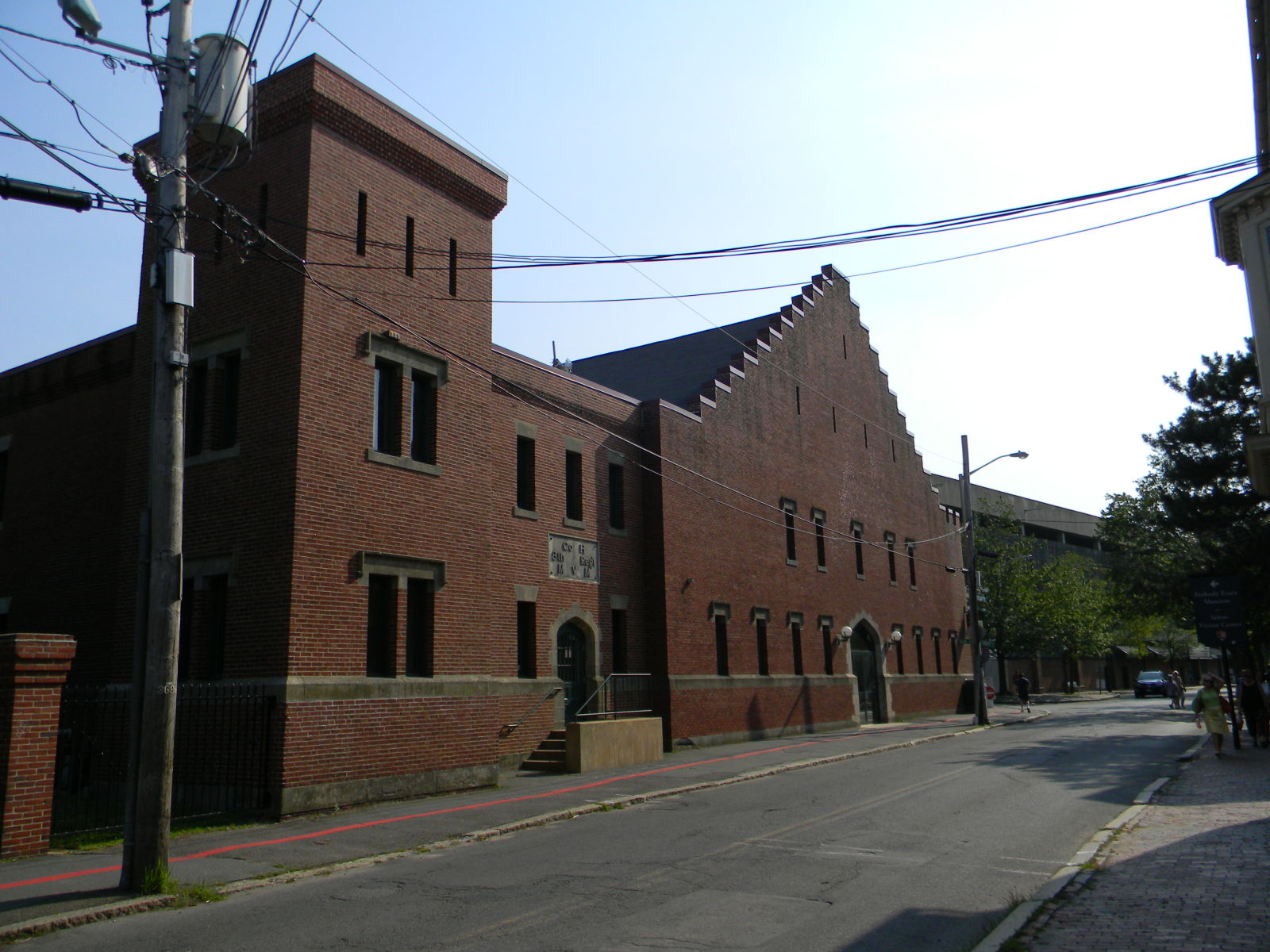
Old National Guard Armory, 2015

In 1637, the first muster on Salem Common took place where for the first time, a regiment of militia (the East Regiment) drilled for the common defense of a multi-community area, thus laying the foundation for what became the Army National Guard. In 1714 Salem decided that forever in front of Nathaniel Higginson's House on the Common there shall be a training Field for the militia.

On August 19, 2010, the Governor of Massachusetts, Deval Patrick, signed HB1145, "An Act Designating the City of Salem as the Birthplace of the National Guard." This is the first step and was later approved by the House in Washington in March 2012.

On January 10, 2013, President Barack Obama signed executive order HR1339 "which designates the City of Salem, Mass., as the birthplace of the U.S. National Guard."

Every year in April, the Second Corps of Cadets gather in front of St. Peter's Episcopal Church, where the body of their founder, Stephen Abbott, is buried. They lay a wreath, play Taps and fire a 21-gun salute.

In another annual commemoration, soldiers gather at Old Salem Armory to honor soldiers who were killed in the Battles of Lexington and Concord.

On April 14, 2012, Salem celebrated the 375th anniversary of the first muster on Salem Common with over more than 1,000 troops taking part in ceremonies and a parade.

== The Salem Common Improvement Fund ==
In 1802 Elias Hasket Derby Junior assumed command of the Second Corps of Cadets. He gave them the task of leveling the Common, taking down the 3 hills and filling in the 5 ponds and the river to the Cove, planting the trees, and erecting a wooden fence. A subscription of 159 people paid for this large public works project.

== Gallery ==
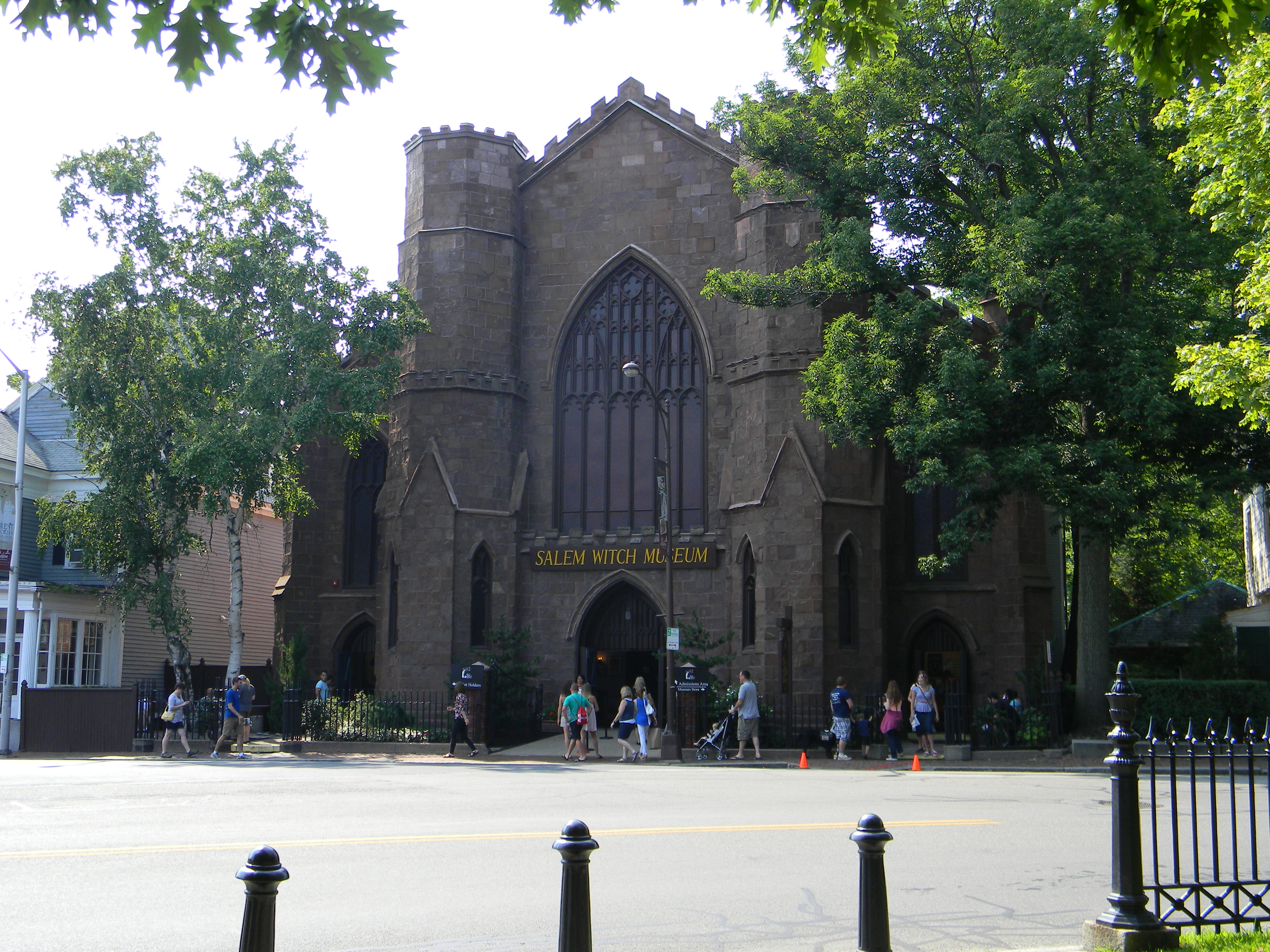
Salem Witch Museum, 2015

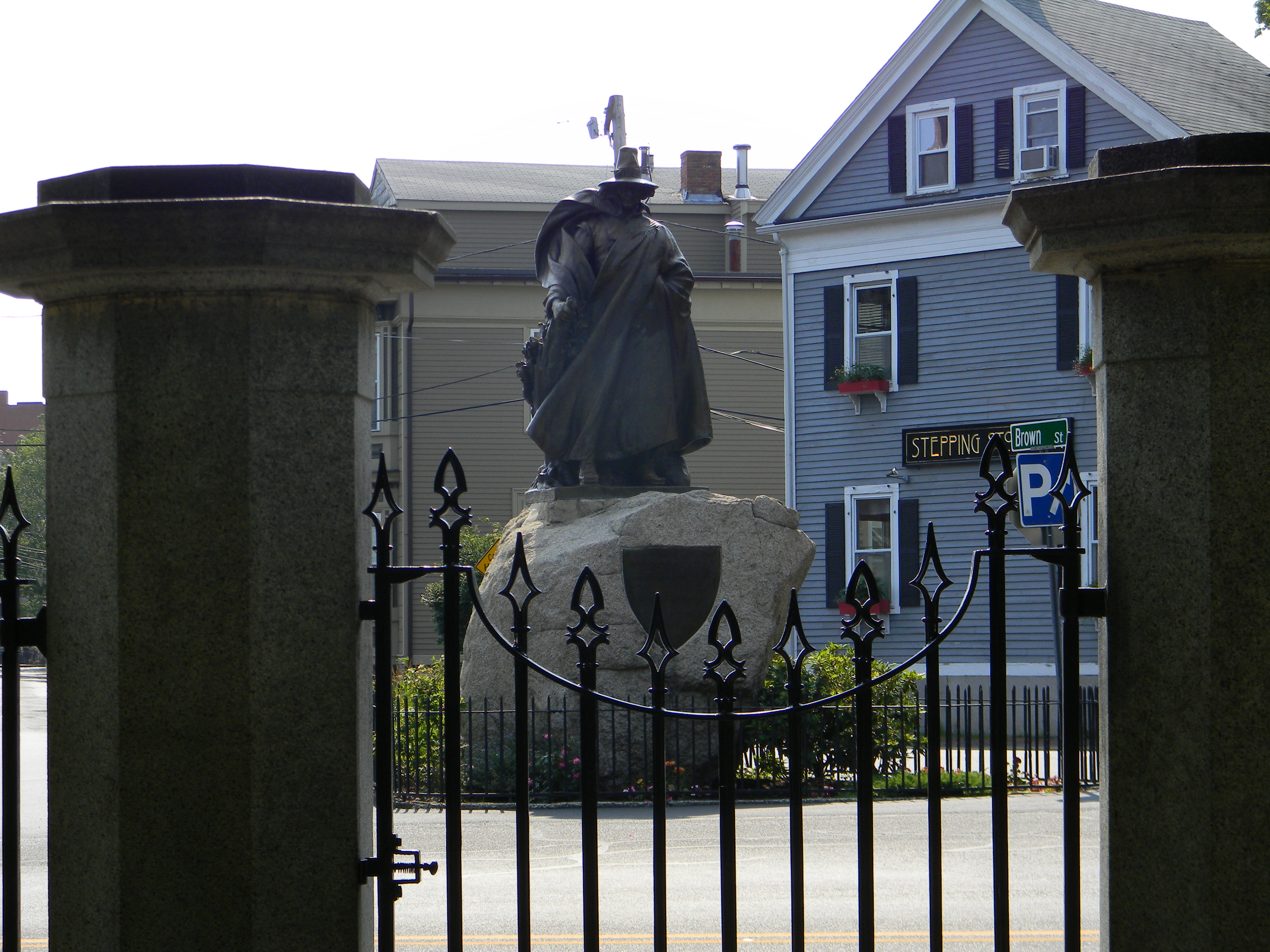
Roger Connet Statue, 2015

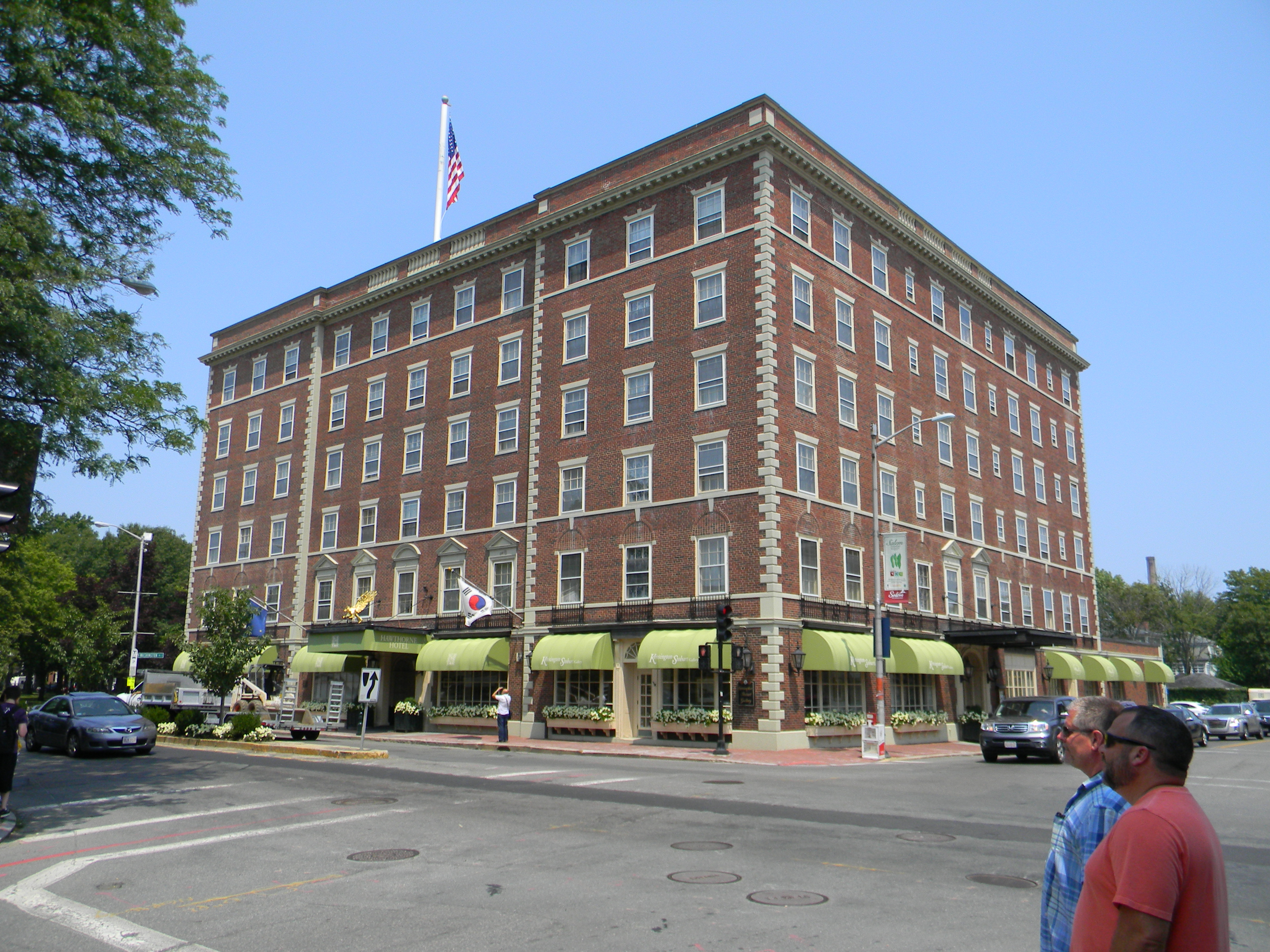
Hawthorne Hotel, 2015

== See also ==
- National Register of Historic Places listings in Salem, Massachusetts
- National Register of Historic Places listings in Essex County, Massachusetts
