= John Tucker Daland House =

Coordinates: 42°31′19.24″N 70°53′29.37″W

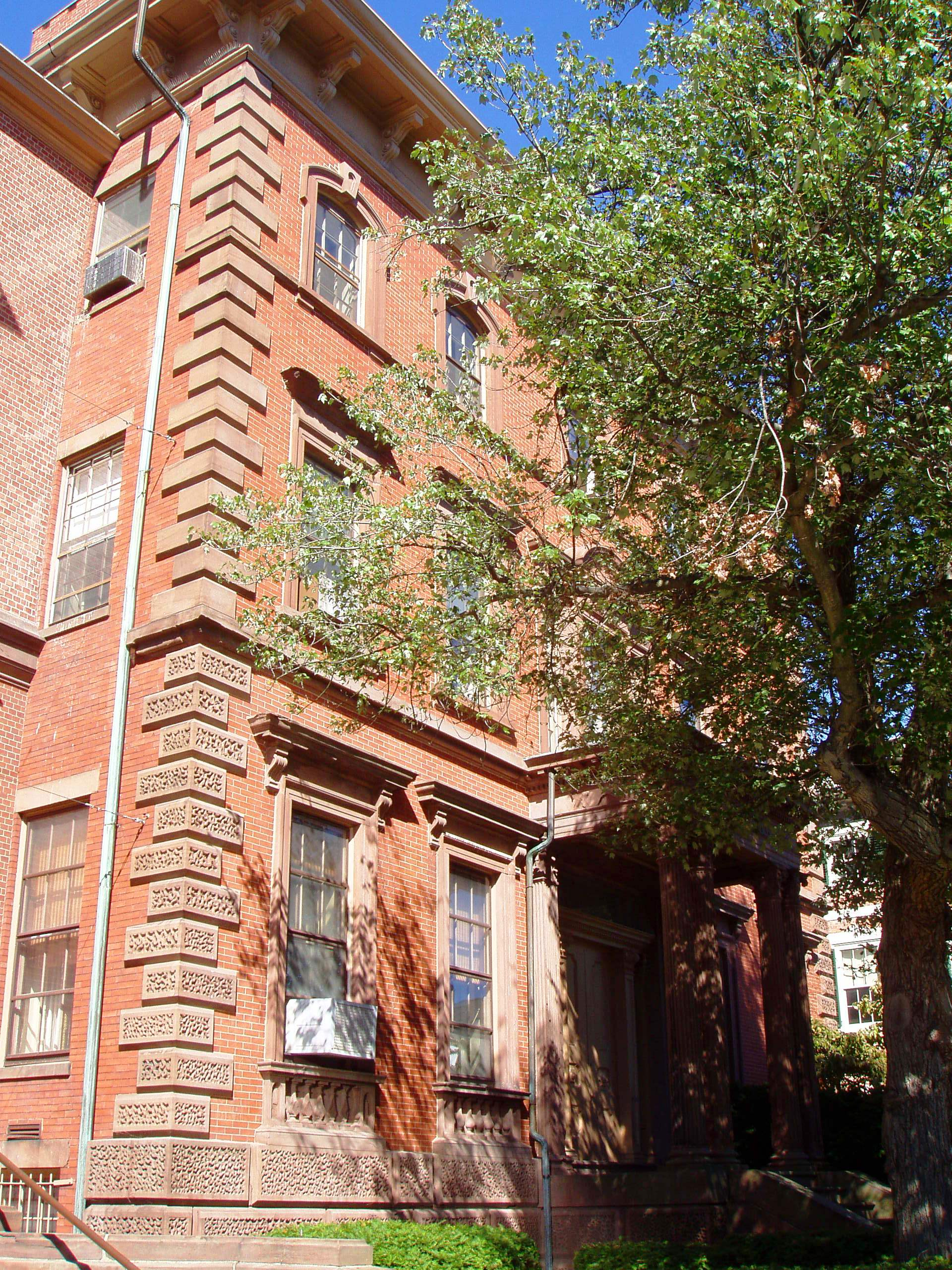
The John Tucker Daland House, Salem, Massachusetts.

The John Tucker Daland House (1851–1852) is an imposing, Italianate house designed by architect Gridley James Fox Bryant and is located at 132 Essex Street, Salem, Massachusetts, United States in the Essex Institute Historic District and now owned by the Peabody Essex Museum. The Italianate-style building is listed on the National Register of Historic Places and was built to house the Salem Athenaeum, a private library.

The three-story brick house was originally built for John Tucker Daland, a prosperous merchant. The Dalands lived in the house until 1885, when it was acquired by the Essex Institute. It was then remodeled as offices by architect William Devereux Dennis (1847–1913) and in 1907 connected to the adjacent Plummer Hall (former home to the Salem Athenaeum).

The house was among the last detached brick houses to be built in Salem. Features of interest include rusticated corner quoins and foundation, fine cornices, both arched and flat-entablatured windows, and an imposing front porch supported by Corinthian columns and topped with a Palladian window. At one time the house also featured roof and porch balustrades, as well as panelled brick chimneys.

== See also ==
- List of historic houses in Massachusetts
