= Essex Institute Historic District =

Historic district in Massachusetts, United States

- U.S. National Register of Historic Places
- U.S. Historic district
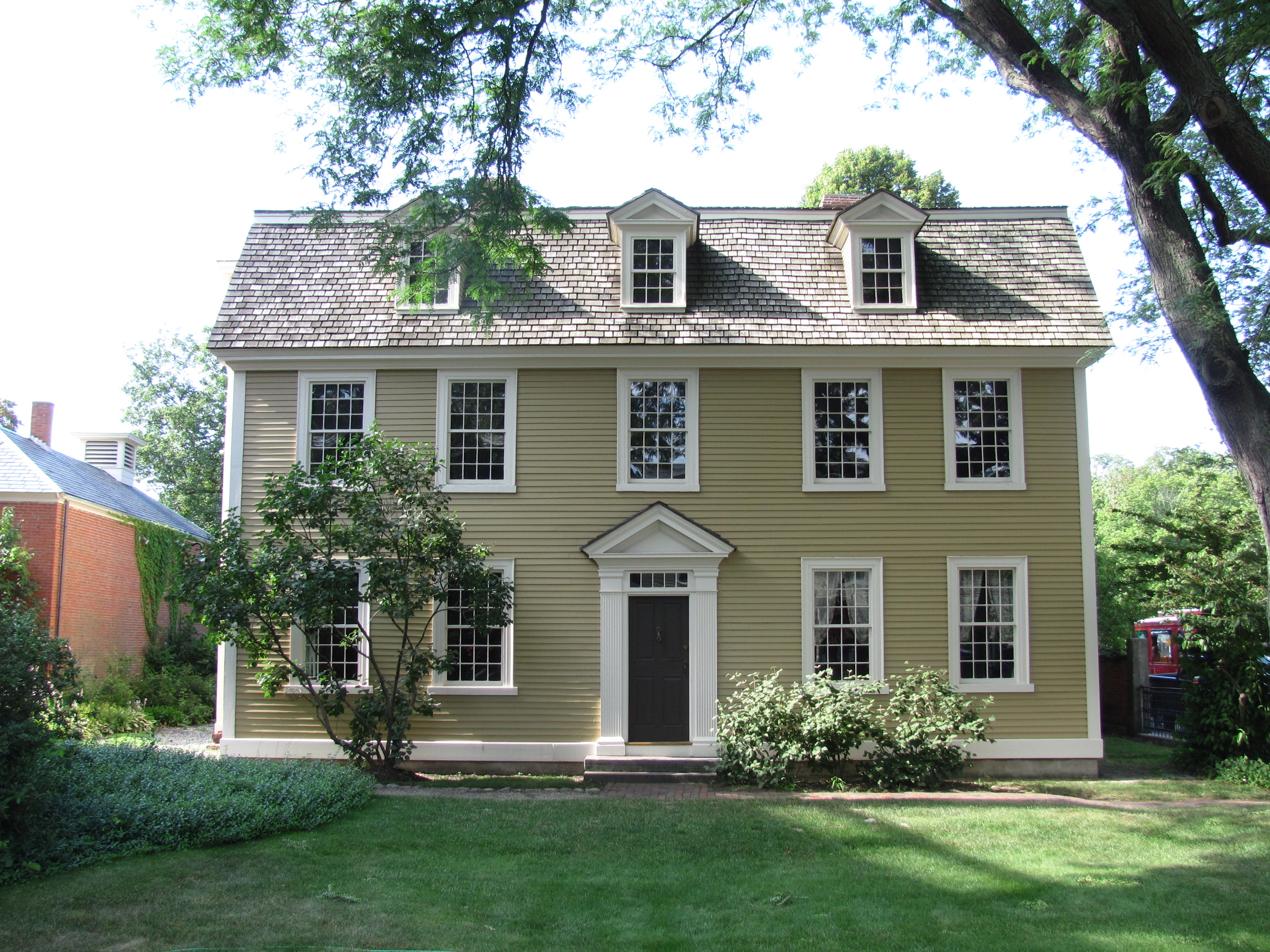
- Crowninshield-Bentley House

- Location within Massachusetts Location within the United States
- Location: Salem, Massachusetts
- Coordinates: 42°31′20″N 70°53′33″W
- Area: 2 acres (0.81 ha)
- Built: 1727
- Architect: McIntire, Samuel
- Architectural style: Renaissance, Italian Villa, Federal
- NRHP reference No.: 72000147
- Added to NRHP: June 22, 1972

The Essex Institute Historic District is a historic district at 134-132, 128, 126 Essex Street and 13 Washington Square West in Salem, Massachusetts. It consists of a compact group of properties associated with the Essex Institute, founded in 1848 and merged in 1992 into the Peabody Essex Museum. Listed by increasing street number, they are: the Crowninshield-Bentley House, the Gardner-Pingree House (a National Historic Landmark), the John Tucker Daland House, and the Phillips Library (the latter two are physically connected). The John Ward House, which fronts on Brown Street but shares the 132 Essex Street address, is another National Historic Landmark within the district. The Andrew Safford House at 13 Washington Square West, built in 1819, was said to be the most expensive home in New England at the time.

The principal buildings of the district are the Daland House and the Phillips Library, the latter of which was the main Essex Institute building. The Daland House was built in 1851, the Library in 1857, and the combination now serve as the library and research facility of the Peabody Essex Museum. The Library is a two-story building, although the second floor is two normal stories high (with suitably large windows), and originally served as exhibition space.

The area behind the Phillips Library and south of Brown Street is a garden area that includes two other historical structures: the Vaughan Doll House, a modest late 17th century one-room structure that may have been a Quaker meeting house, and the Lyle-Tapley Shoe Shop. They both stand near the John Ward House, which faces into the garden as well.

Just to the east of the Daland House stands the Gardner-Pingree House, an elegant Federal mansion built in 1804 by noted Salem architect Samuel McIntire. To its east, at the corner of Essex and Washington Square West, stands the Bentley-Crowninshield House, a c. 1727 Georgian house that was relocated from a site across Essex Street in 1860. The Andrew-Safford House is behind the Bentley-Crowninshield House, facing Salem Common.

The district was added to the National Register of Historic Places in 1972; all of the properties in the district were also included in the Salem Common Historic District in 1976.

On December 8, 2017, much to the dismay of Salem residents, Dan L. Monroe, PEM's Rose-Marie and Eijk van Otterloo Director and CEO, issued a press release announcing that the 42,000 linear feet of historical documents will be permanently relocated to Rowley, MA and Plummer Hall and Daland House, the two historic buildings which had housed the Phillips Library, will be utilized as office and meeting space.

== See also ==
- Downtown Salem District, just to the west
- Charter Street Historic District, on the far side of the main Peabody Essex Museum building
- List of historic houses in Massachusetts
- National Register of Historic Places listings in Salem, Massachusetts
- National Register of Historic Places listings in Essex County, Massachusetts
