= Joseph Story House =

Historic house in Massachusetts, United States

- U.S. National Register of Historic Places
- U.S. National Historic Landmark
- U.S. Historic district – Contributing property
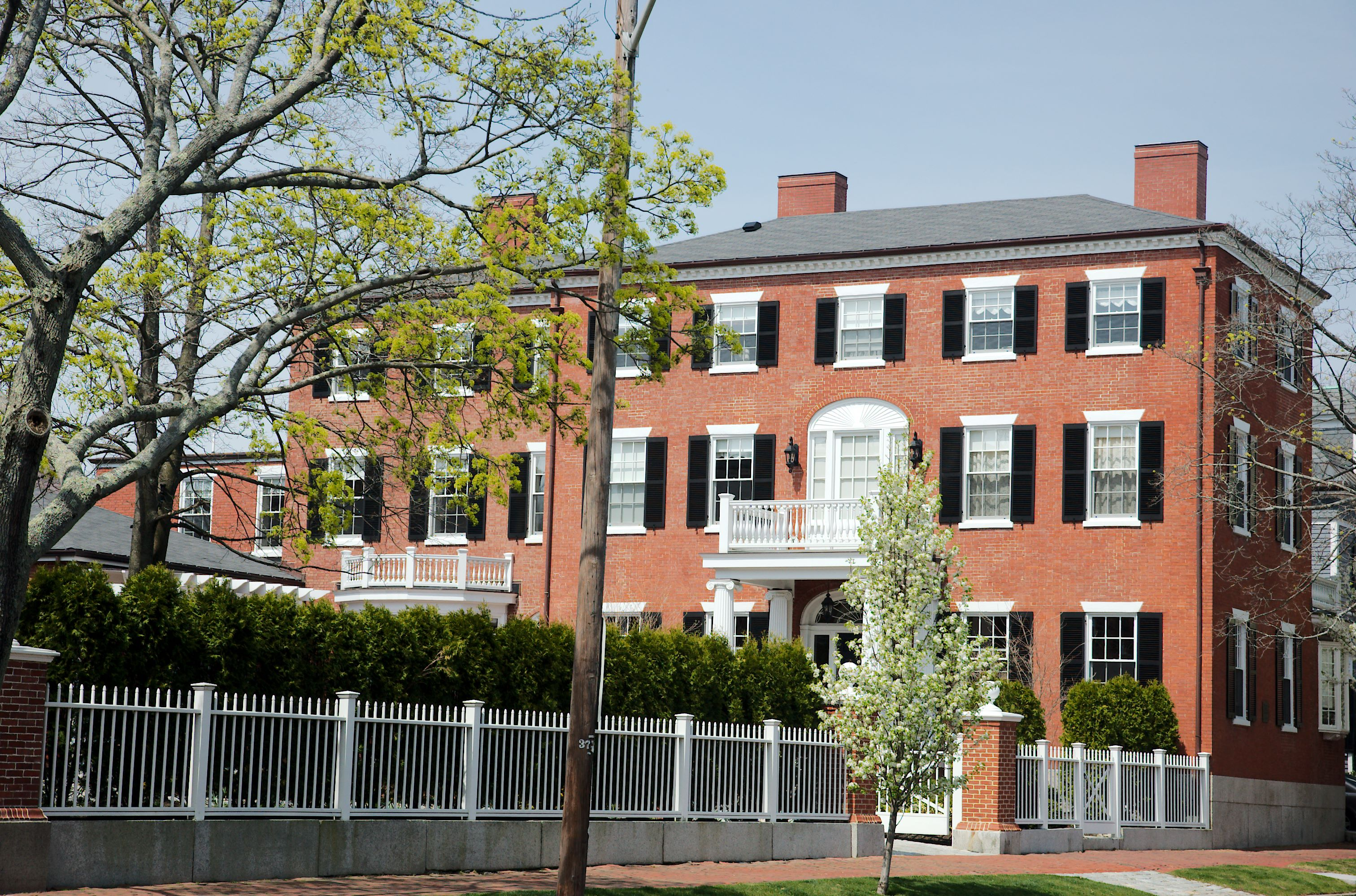

- Location within Massachusetts Location within the United States
- Location: 26 Winter Street, Salem, Massachusetts
- Coordinates: 42°31′29″N 70°53′27″W
- Area: 1.1 acres (0.45 ha)
- Built: 1811
- Architectural style: Federal
- Part of: Salem Common Historic District (ID76000303)
- NRHP reference No.: 73001952

Significant dates
- Added to NRHP: November 7, 1973
- Designated NHL: November 7, 1973
- Designated CP: May 12, 1976

The Joseph Story House is a historic house facing the Salem Common in Salem, Massachusetts. Built in 1811, this house was home from then until his death of United States Supreme Court Associate Justice Joseph Story (1779–1845), a leading jurist of the time, and an influential figure in the early years of Harvard Law School. A well-preserved example of Federal architecture executed in brick, it is a National Historic Landmark.

== Description and history ==
The Story House is a three-story brick structure with a hip roof and two interior chimneys. The walls are laid in Flemish bond, with granite trim above and below the windows. The windows are six-over-six sash windows, with those on the third floor shorter than those on the lower floors. A three-story addition, narrower in depth than the main block and set back, extends to the left. The main entrance, centered on the main block, is sheltered by a portico that is probably early 20th century. The front of the ell has a bay window of similar vintage and styling. The interior is very well preserved, retaining original woodwork, plasterwork, and other decorative elements.

The house was built in 1811 for Joseph Story, who was in that same year named an Associate Justice of the United States Supreme Court by President James Madison; just 32 at the time, he was its youngest-ever justice. During his distinguished career on the bench, he made groundbreaking jurisprudence, particularly in the area of admiralty law, and was known for his erudite and thoroughly-thought opinions. He also rendered opinions important in establishing and defining the relationship between the federal government and the states.

Story owned the house until his death in 1845. His most notable guests included James Madison (in 1817) and the Marquis de Lafayette. The house is also the birthplace in 1819 of Story's son William Wetmore Story, a well-known sculptor.

The house is located in the Salem Common Historic District (Salem, Massachusetts) and was designated a National Historic Landmark and listed on the National Register of Historic Places in 1973.

== See also ==
- National Register of Historic Places listings in Salem, Massachusetts
- National Register of Historic Places listings in Essex County, Massachusetts
- List of National Historic Landmarks in Massachusetts
- List of historic houses in Massachusetts
