= Peabody Essex Museum =

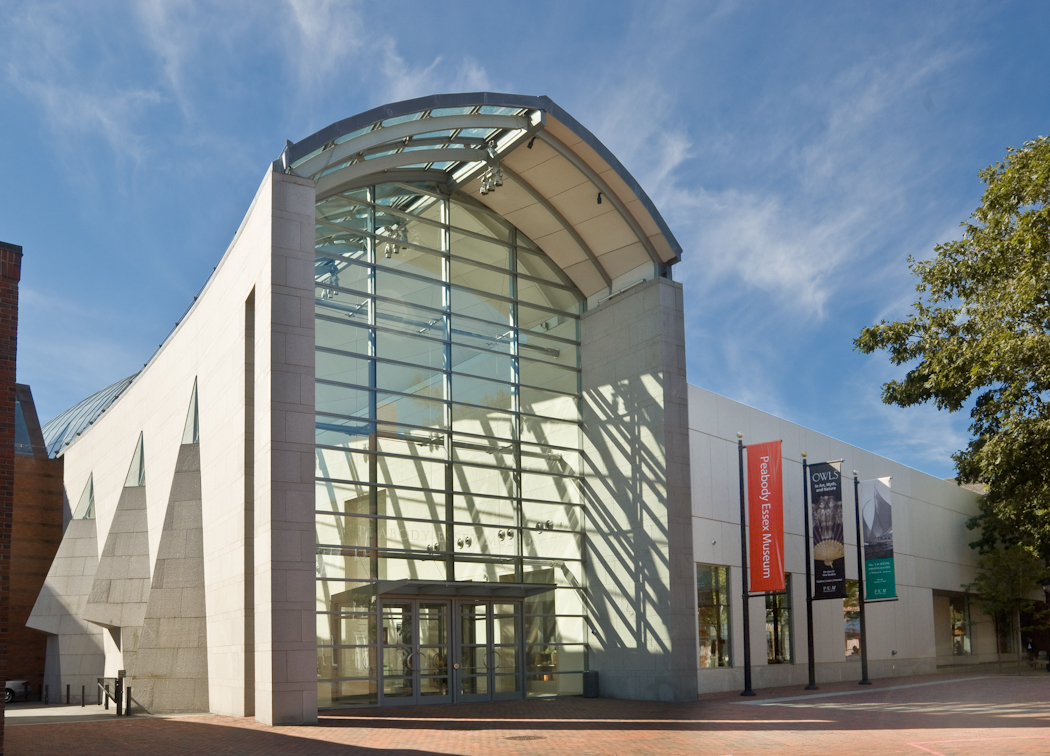
- The main entrance to the museum

- Location in Massachusetts Peabody Essex Museum (the United States)
- Established: 1799
- Location: 161 Essex Street; Salem, MA 01970
- Coordinates: 42°31′18″N 70°53′32″W
- Type: Art museum
- Accreditation: AAM, NARM
- Collections: American art, Asian art, maritime art
- Collection size: 1.3 million
- Director: Lynda Roscoe Hartigan
- Public transit access: Newburyport/Rockport Line Salem Station
- Website: pem.org

The Peabody Essex Museum (PEM) in Salem, Massachusetts, US, is a successor to the East India Marine Society, established in 1799. It combines the collections of the former Peabody Museum of Salem (which acquired the Society's collection) and the Essex Institute. PEM is one of the oldest continuously operating museums in the United States and holds one of the major collections of Asian art in the United States. Its total holdings include about 1.3 million pieces, as well as twenty-two historic buildings.

After opening newly expanded spaces in 2019, PEM now ranks in the top 10 North American art museums in terms of gallery square footage, operating budget and endowment. The PEM holds more than 840,000 works of historical and cultural art covering maritime, American, Asian, Oceanic and African art, Asian export art, and two large libraries with over 400,000 books and manuscripts.

== History ==
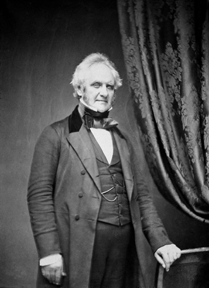
George Peabody, benefactor

The East India Marine Society built East India Marine Hall, a National Historic Landmark now embedded in the museum's facilities, in the 1820s to house its collection. This collection was acquired by the Peabody Academy of Science (later renamed the Peabody Museum of Salem) in 1867, along with the building, which continued to serve as a museum space through these mergers and acquisitions.

In 1984, the Museum of the American China Trade in Milton closed, and donated its collection of artifacts to the PEM.

In 1992, the Peabody Museum of Salem merged with the Essex Institute to form the Peabody Essex Museum. Included in the merger was the legacy of the East India Marine Society, established in 1799 by a group of Salem-based captains and supercargoes. Members of the Society were required by the society's charter to collect "natural and artificial curiosities" from beyond the Cape of Good Hope or Cape Horn. They were also required to personally circumnavigate the globe, and share navigational discoveries with other Society members, thereby increasing their chances of returning from their voyages safely. Due to the institution's age, the items they donated to the collections are significant for their rare combination of age and provenance.

Peabody Essex Museum origins

East India Marine Society est.1799
Peabody Academy of Science; 1868–1915	Essex Historical Society est.1821	Essex County Natural History Society; 1833–1848
Peabody Museum of Salem; 1915–1992	Essex Institute; 1848–1992
Peabody Essex Museum; 1992–present

=== 21st century ===
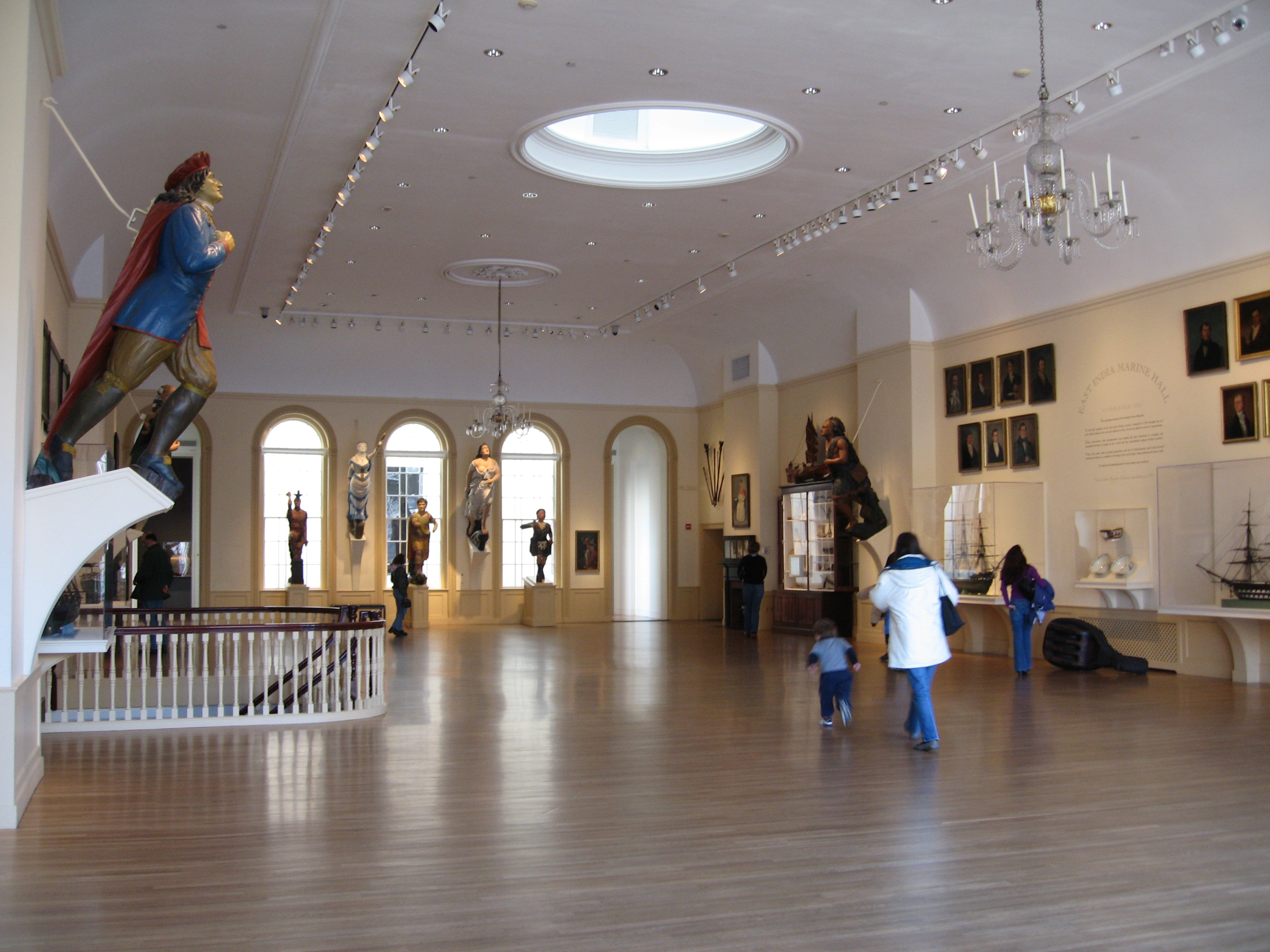
The 1825 East India Marine Hall, one of the oldest parts of the museum, is used for special events, and for temporary art installations

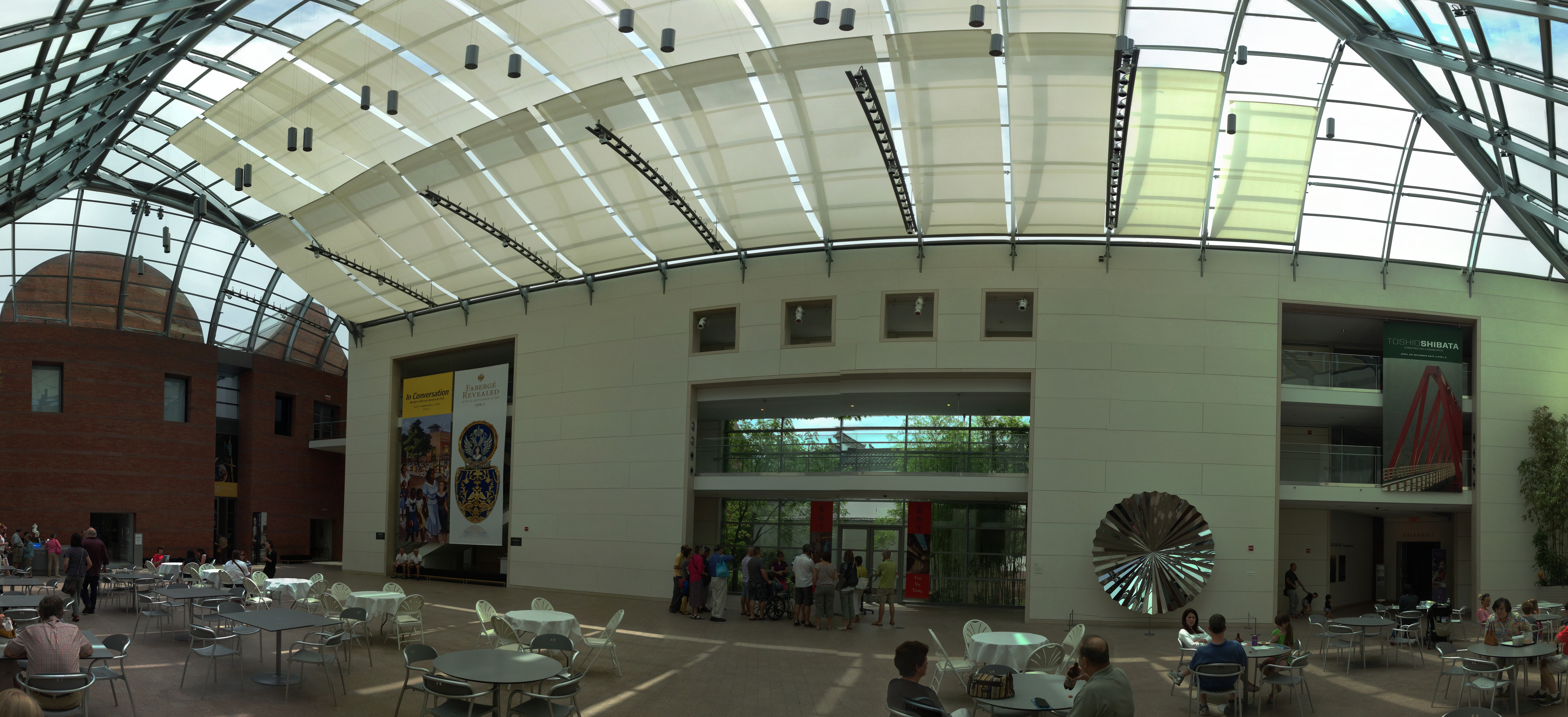
The spacious central atrium has movable solar shades (July 2013)

In 2003, the Peabody Essex Museum completed a massive $100 million renovation and expansion resulting in the opening of a new wing designed by Moshe Safdie. This more than doubled the gallery space to 250,000 square feet (23,000 m^{2}), which allowed the display of many items from its extensive holdings, previously unknown to the public due to lack of exhibition space. At this time, the museum also opened to the public the Yin Yu Tang House, an early 19th-century Chinese house from Anhui Province that had been disassembled in its original village and reconstructed on the museum grounds.

In 2011, the Peabody Essex Museum announced it had raised $550 million, with plans to raise an additional $100 million by 2016. The Boston Globe reported this was the largest capital campaign in the museum's history, vaulting the Peabody Essex into the top tier of major art museums. The PEM trustee co-chairs Sam Byrne and Sean Healey with board president Robert Shapiro led the campaign.$200 to $250 million will fund the museum's 175,000-square-foot (16,300 m^{2}) expansion bringing the total square footage to 425,000 square feet (39,500 m^{2}).

In May 2012, the PEM confirmed that its expansion would not be finished until 2019, due to the unexpected death of museum architect Rick Mather in April 2012 and the search for his replacement. The firm of Ennead Architects (New York) was chosen after successfully completing the first phase of the building project, which included master planning and the renovation of the museum's Dodge wing, which was scheduled to open in November 2013.

On September 28, 2019, the museum opened a new 40,000-square-foot (3,700 m^{2}) wing designed by Ennead Architects, adjacent to East India Marine Hall. This addition included 15,000 square feet (1,400 m^{2}) of Class A galleries as well as a 5,000-square-foot (460 m^{2}) landscaped garden designed by Nelson Byrd Woltz Landscape Architects.

== Leadership ==
In 2021, Lynda Roscoe Hartigan, PEM's former deputy director and Chief Curator, became the first woman to be the Rose-Marie and Eijk van Otterloo Director and CEO of PEM.

The director and CEO from 1993 to 2019 was Dan Monroe. He was succeeded on July 15, 2019, by Brian Kennedy, who previously directed the Toledo Museum of Art.

== Collections ==
=== African art ===
The Peabody Essex Museum's collection of African art includes approximately 3,600 objects as of 2014. The acquisition of these works began in the early 19th century, as members of the East India Marine Society collected objects from West and sub-Saharan Africa. These objects include ceremonial masks, pottery, woven baskets, and a significant collection of Ethiopian art—particularly Christian icons and metalwork, many of which are based in the traditions of Byzantine art. In 1812, Salem became the headquarters of the American Board of Commissioners for Foreign Missions, which went on to establish missions throughout the continent. These missions facilitated trade, particularly with the Zulu in South Africa, and contributed significantly to the growth of the collection.

=== American art ===
PEM's extensive collection of American art includes over 1,000 portraits, among them works by John Singer Sargent, Fitz Henry Lane, and James Bard. Furniture, folk art, and needlework are also prominent features of the collection. The museum's New England heritage has brought it an especially large array of decorative arts from the Northeastern United States. Many of these objects were initially collected by the Essex Institute, which was dedicated to preserving the cultural and physical history of Essex County.

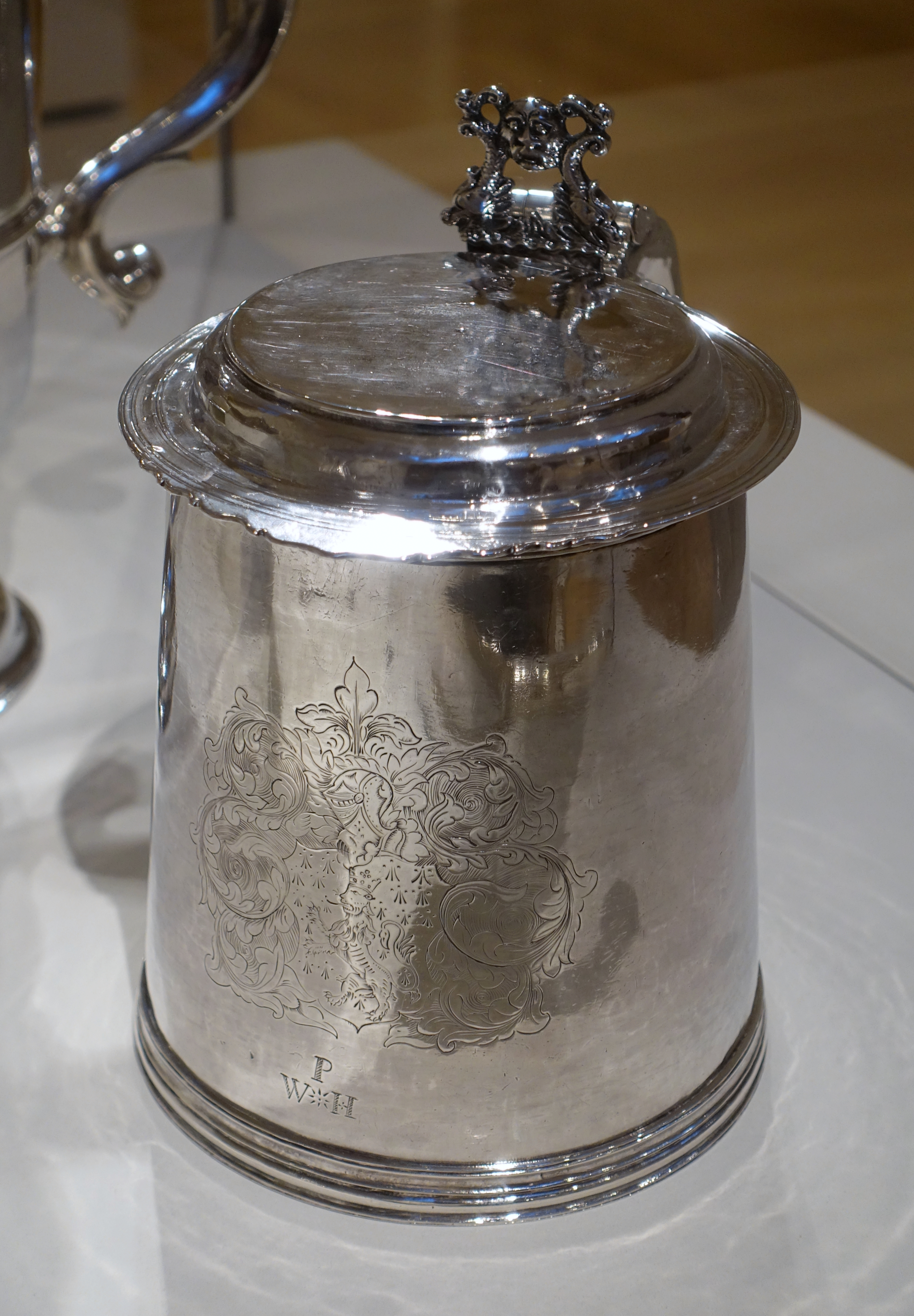
This silver tankard was made by Boston silversmith Edward Winslow in 1695.

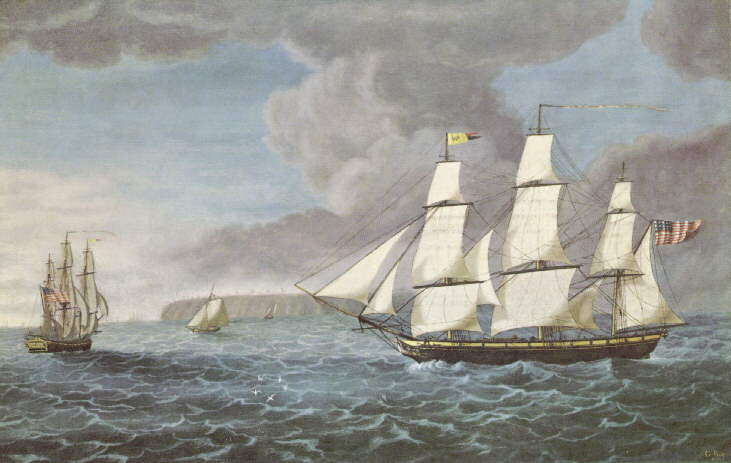
This painting, The "Friendship," Homeward Bound, which was painted by George Ropes, Jr. (who was mute), is in the museum's collection. He was the nephew of one of the ship's owners, Jerathmiel Peirce, whose house still stands and is also owned by the museum. A full-scale replica of the ship is at the Salem Maritime National Historic Site.

=== Chinese art ===
The museum's collection of Chinese art, which includes over 6,000 objects, features contemporary and ancient works as well as works by minority nationalities within China. Ceramics, textiles, and calligraphy form the bulk of the collection, which began in the 18th century with exports acquired by New England traders. Even before the founding of the East India Marine Society, missionaries such as Reverend William Bentley were collecting sculptures, fans, and other pieces that would form the foundation of the museum's collection. The largest piece at the museum is the Yin Yu Tang House, a late 18th century home from the Anhui province of China. This house, constructed during the Qing dynasty, was acquired by Nancy Berliner, at the time PEM's curator of Chinese art and culture, before being taken apart and reassembled in Salem.

=== Fashion and textiles ===
Among the most important in the United States, the museum's American clothing collection, with examples dating from the early 18th century to the present, represents many of New England's prominent families, including Salem's Crowninshields, who helped establish the city as a seafaring hub. Among its areas of strength are military uniforms, a collection established by the Essex Institute following the end of the American Civil War in 1865, and significant holdings representing the work of notable designers, dressmakers and milliners, including Alexander McQueen, Rei Kawakubo, Jamie Okuma, and hundreds of pieces from legendary fashion icon, Iris Apfel.

=== Indian art ===
The Peabody Essex Museum's collection of Indian art includes over 5,000 objects. It also possesses numerous works of Tibetan and Nepalese origins, along with perhaps the most important collection of contemporary Indian art outside of India. PEM's Herwitz Gallery, opened in 2003 and named to honor art collectors Chester and Davida Herwitz, is the first American museum gallery dedicated to modern Indian art. PEM's collection spans a wide array of eras and mediums, forming a detailed record of India's artistic transformations during colonial rule and its aftermath. As PEM's ex-curator of South Asia and Korean Art Susan S. Bean observed, "the global development of industrial production brought machine-woven textiles, printed images, and photography into competition with handlooms, sculpture, and painting", all of which are art forms well represented throughout PEM's collection.

=== Japanese art ===
Featuring approximately 18,300 objects, PEM's collection of Japanese art began with the museum's inception in 1799. Its collections of work from the Edo period and Meiji period are particularly robust, featuring armor, sculpture, painted scrolls, furniture, and more. Much of the collection has its origins in the travels of Edward S. Morse, the third director of the museum, who acquired many pieces over the course of three trips to Japan. Morse also helped raise interest in Japanese art in Massachusetts and New England: as Midori Oka states, Morse was "instrumental in influencing the area intellectuals and connoisseurs to turn their interests to Japanese art".

=== Korean art ===
The Peabody Essex Museum has approximately 1,800 pieces of Korean art in its collection, including ceramics, textiles, and painted screens. The collection began in 1883, as the result of a collaboration between museum director Edward Sylvester Morse and Korean scholar Yu Kil-chun, who was a member of the first official Korean delegation to the United States. Much of the collection consists of art of the Joseon dynasty, which occupied the transitional period between the traditional Korean empire and modernity. Many of the pieces in the collection, particularly those from the Joseon period, display the centrality of art in the habits, rituals, and ceremonies of everyday Korean life. As former PEM curator Susan S. Bean observes, art objects were "essential to the conduct of social life because they conveyed values, fulfilled wishes, provided access to deities and ancestors, taught lessons and conferred prestige".

=== Maritime art ===
By the end of the 18th century, coinciding with the museum's 1799 founding, Salem was one of the nation's most prosperous seaports, and extensive trading of furs, spices, dyes, and other goods brought much wealth to the region. This long legacy of trade contributed greatly to the foundation and growth of PEM's maritime art collection, which is among the finest of its kind in the country. The collection includes over 50,000 objects, including paintings, model ships, scrimshaw, and more. Many diverse styles and periods of maritime art are on display in the collection, from navigational tools such as sextants to modern marine art, which addresses "nostalgic themes" and represents "the seafaring life of previous times". One significant feature of the currently installed collection is a recreation of a room in Cleopatra's Barge, an opulent yacht which was built by Salem's Crowninshield family and eventually became the royal yacht of King Kamehameha II.

=== Native American art ===
PEM's collection of Native American art includes over 20,000 objects, spanning a wide variety of tribal affiliations and time periods. The collection includes masks, textiles, jewelry, clothing, sculpture, and more, along with many pieces by contemporary Native American artists such as Frank Day and Kay WalkingStick. The origins of PEM's collection can be traced to even before the museum's 1799 founding: the maritime fur trade, as well as the trading of iron to local tribes, made the exchange of art objects a frequent occurrence. As Richard Conn writes, "in some cases, objects of considerable importance were given by their native owners as gifts to their European trading partners. The intent here was probably to enhance the trading relationship and to insure that the Yankee or British ship would return next year with more iron."

=== Oceanic art ===
Featuring objects from over 36 different groups of islands in Polynesia, Melanesia, and Micronesia, the Peabody Essex Museum's collection of Oceanic art contains over 15,000 objects in total. These objects, consisting of sculptures, weapons, clothing, and more, include pieces made from traditional Oceanic materials such as porpoise teeth, abalone, and human hair. Also worth noting is the museum's particularly substantial collection of Hawaiian art, which includes over 5,000 objects. While Salem had little direct trade with Hawaii during the 18th and 19th centuries, regional trade and donations from prominent sea captains led to the acquisition of many significant pieces, including some associated with Kamehameha I and James Cook.

=== Photography ===
PEM's collection of photography is its largest single collection by number of objects, featuring over 850,000 images. The collection began in 1840, just one year after the invention of photography. It includes work by pioneering photographers such as William Henry Fox Talbot and Antoine Claudet. It also features a collection of rare Civil War photographs by Matthew Brady, one of the first American photographers. The collection has a vast variety of subjects and styles, from records of native life in the Philippines to photographs by Walker Evans which document the Great Depression.

=== Library ===
The museum has extensive collections of rare books, manuscripts, and ephemera in the Phillips Library. On December 8, 2017, Dan L. Monroe, PEM's director and CEO, issued a press release announcing that 42,000 feet (13,000 m) of historical documents would be permanently relocated to Rowley, Massachusetts; Plummer Hall and Daland House, the two historic buildings which had housed the Phillips Library, would be utilized as office and meeting space.

=== Architecture in the collection ===
The museum owns 24 historic structures and gardens, some of which are concentrated in the old Essex Institute grounds which now form the Essex Institute Historic District. Five of these buildings are National Historic Landmarks and eight others are listed on the National Register of Historic Places. Some are shown in the gallery below. The full set of buildings are: Daniel Bray House, Gilbert Chadwick House, Cotting-Smith Assembly House, Crowninshield-Bentley House, John Tucker Daland House, Derby-Beebe Summer House, East India Marine Hall (integrated into the main museum), Gardner-Pingree House and Gardner-Pingree Carriage House, Lyle-Tapley Shoe Shop, Dodge Wing of the Peabody Essex Museum, Asian Export Art Wing of the Peabody Essex Museum, Peirce-Nichols House, Samuel Pickman House, Plummer Hall, Quaker Meeting House, L. H. Rogers Building, Ropes Mansion, Andrew Safford House, Summer School Building, Vilate Young (Kinsman) House, and John Ward House. Some of these properties are open to guided tours.

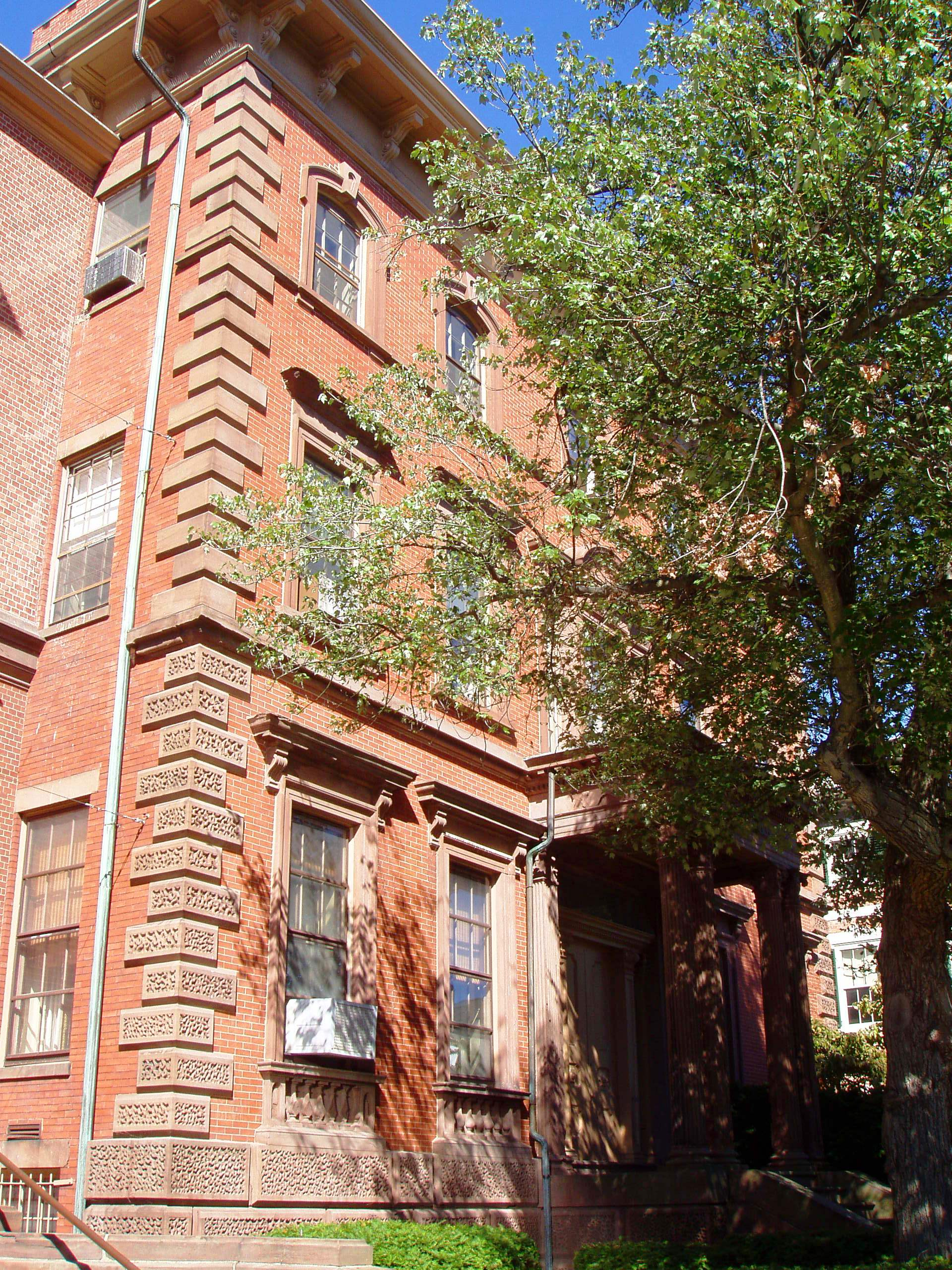
John Tucker Daland House

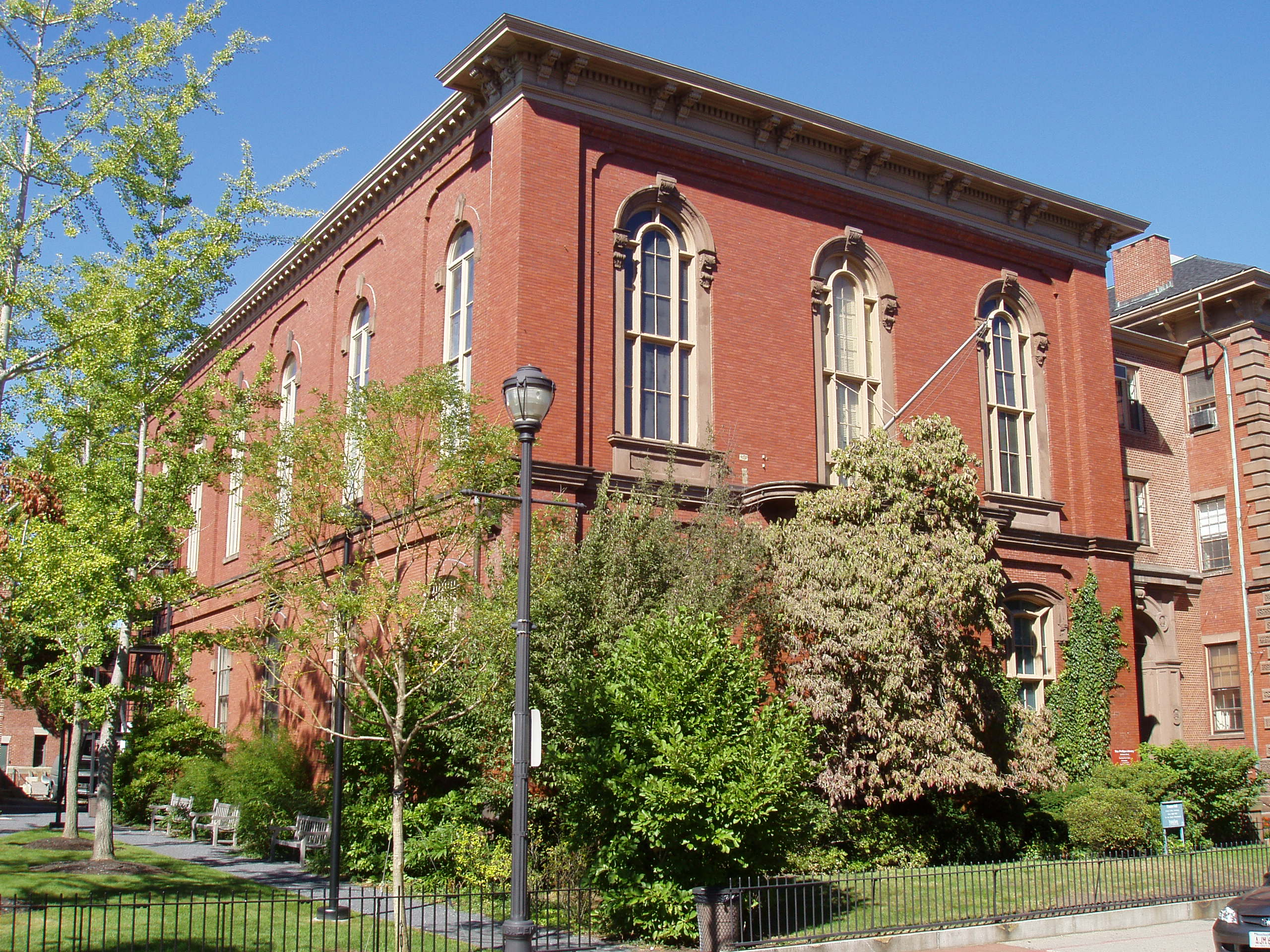
Plummer Hall (formerly Salem Athenaeum)

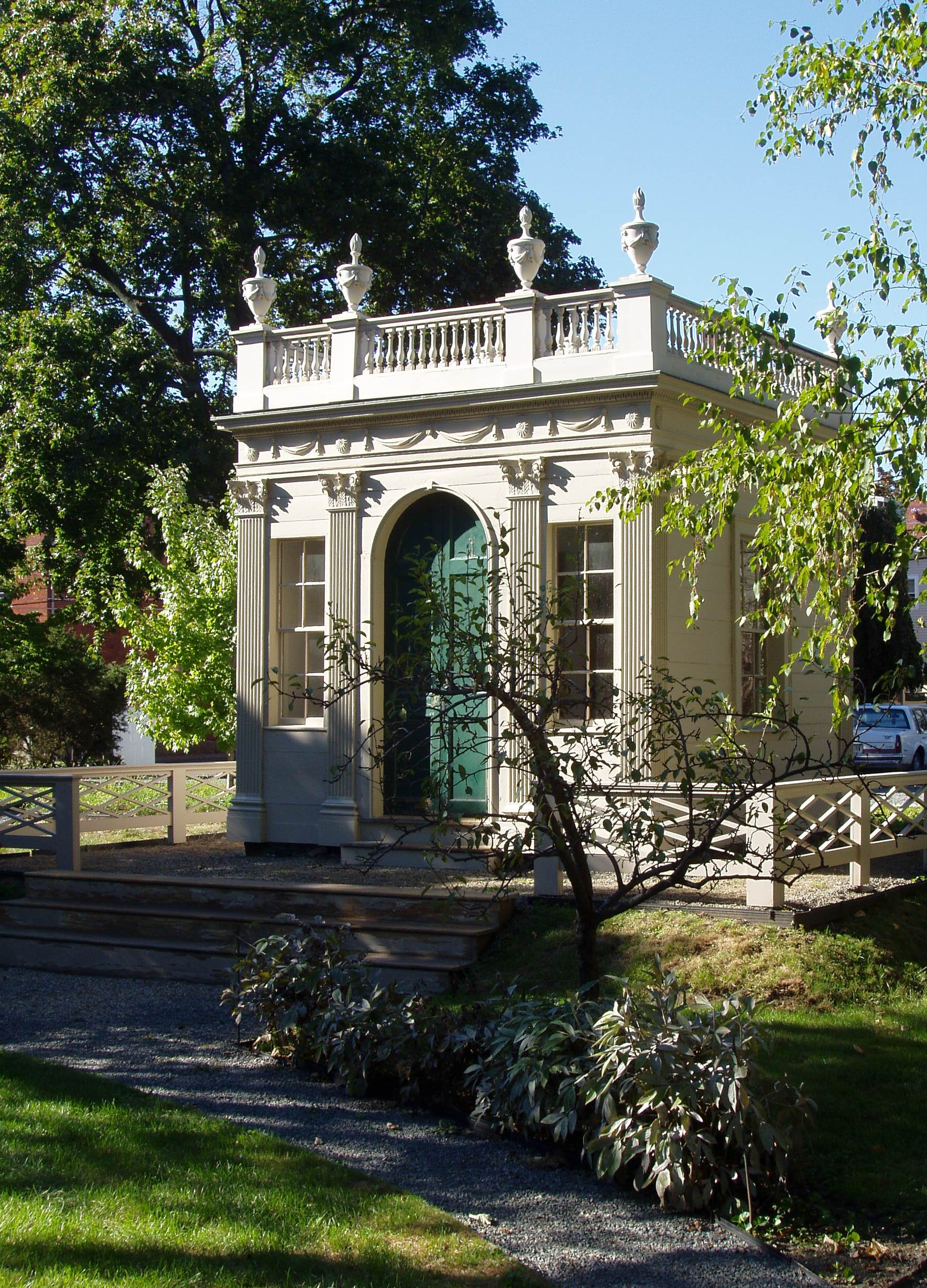
Derby-Beebe Summer House

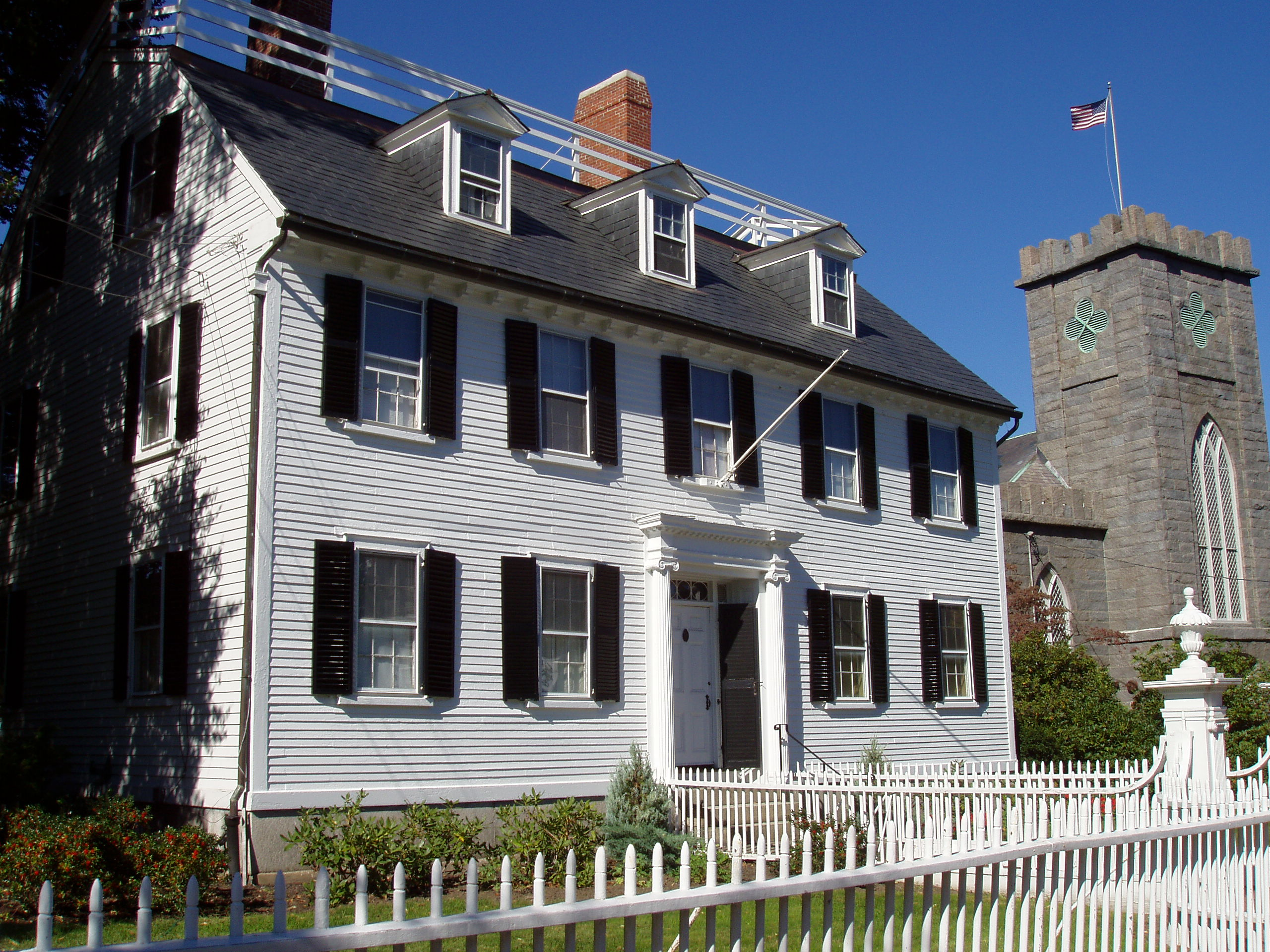
Ropes Mansion

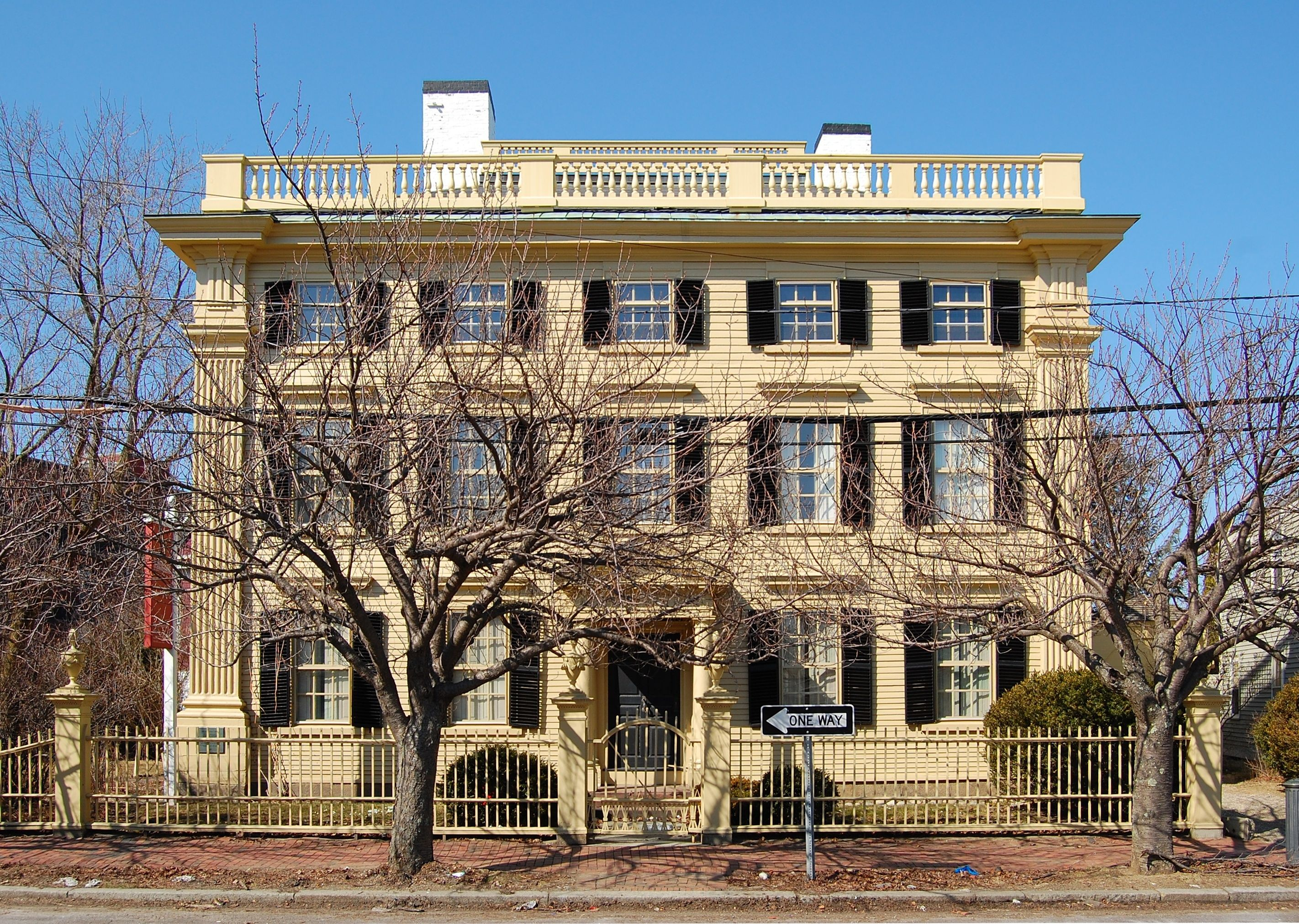
Peirce-Nichols House

=== American art ===
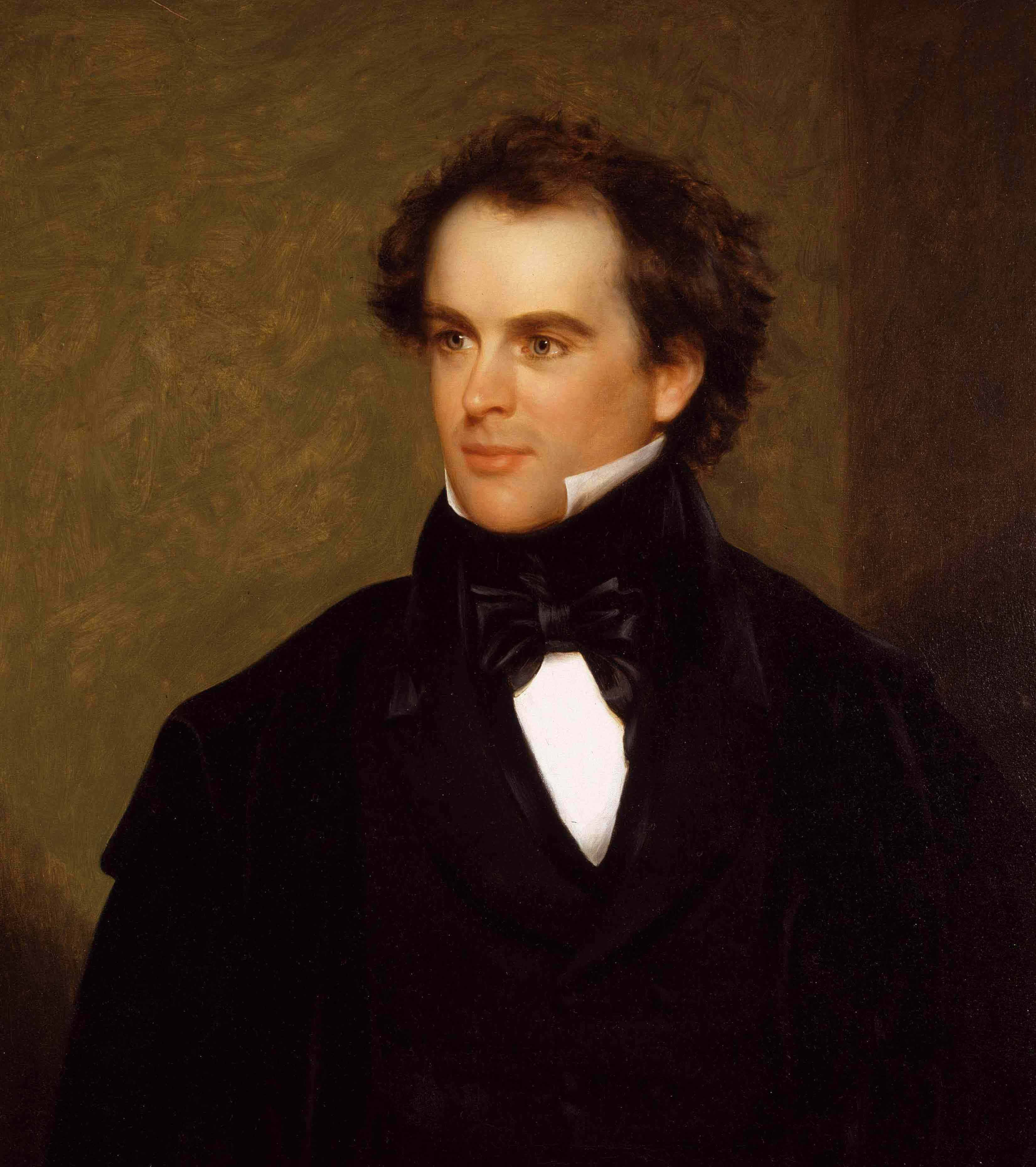
Nathaniel Hawthorne by Charles Osgood

Among the American artists represented in the museum's collection:

- Clifford Warren Ashley
- James Bard
- Frank Weston Benson
- John Prentiss Benson
- James E. Buttersworth
- John Singleton Copley
- Michele Felice Cornè
- George Washington Felt (1776–1847)
- Alvan Fisher
- Fitz Hugh Lane
- Charles Osgood
- Frederic Remington
- George Ropes, Jr. (1788–1819)
- Robert Salmon
- John Singer Sargent
- William Pierce Stubbs
- Wesley Webber
- Charles Wilkes

== Programs ==
The Peabody Essex Museum (PEM) maintains a diverse array of educational and public programs designed to foster creativity and cultural understanding through its "Learning & Community Engagement" initiative. Key offerings include intergenerational activities at the Dotty Brown Art & Nature Center, curator-led gallery talks, and the "PEMcast" podcast, which provides behind-the-scenes insights into the museum's collections. The museum hosts major civic celebrations throughout the year, such as Lunar New Year festivals and "Eerie Events" in October, alongside recurring series like "Music in the Atrium" and the "PEM Reads" book club. Specialized programs cater to specific audiences, including "PEM Pals" for preschoolers, sensory-friendly tours for visitors with diverse needs, and K-12 school tours aligned with state curriculum frameworks. Additionally, PEM integrates scientific inquiry into its programming through unique research initiatives that explore the intersection of neuroscience and art engagement.

== See also ==
- Huangshan District
- Essex Institute Historic District
- List of maritime museums in the United States
