= Ropes Mansion =

Georgian Colonial mansion in Salem, Massachusetts

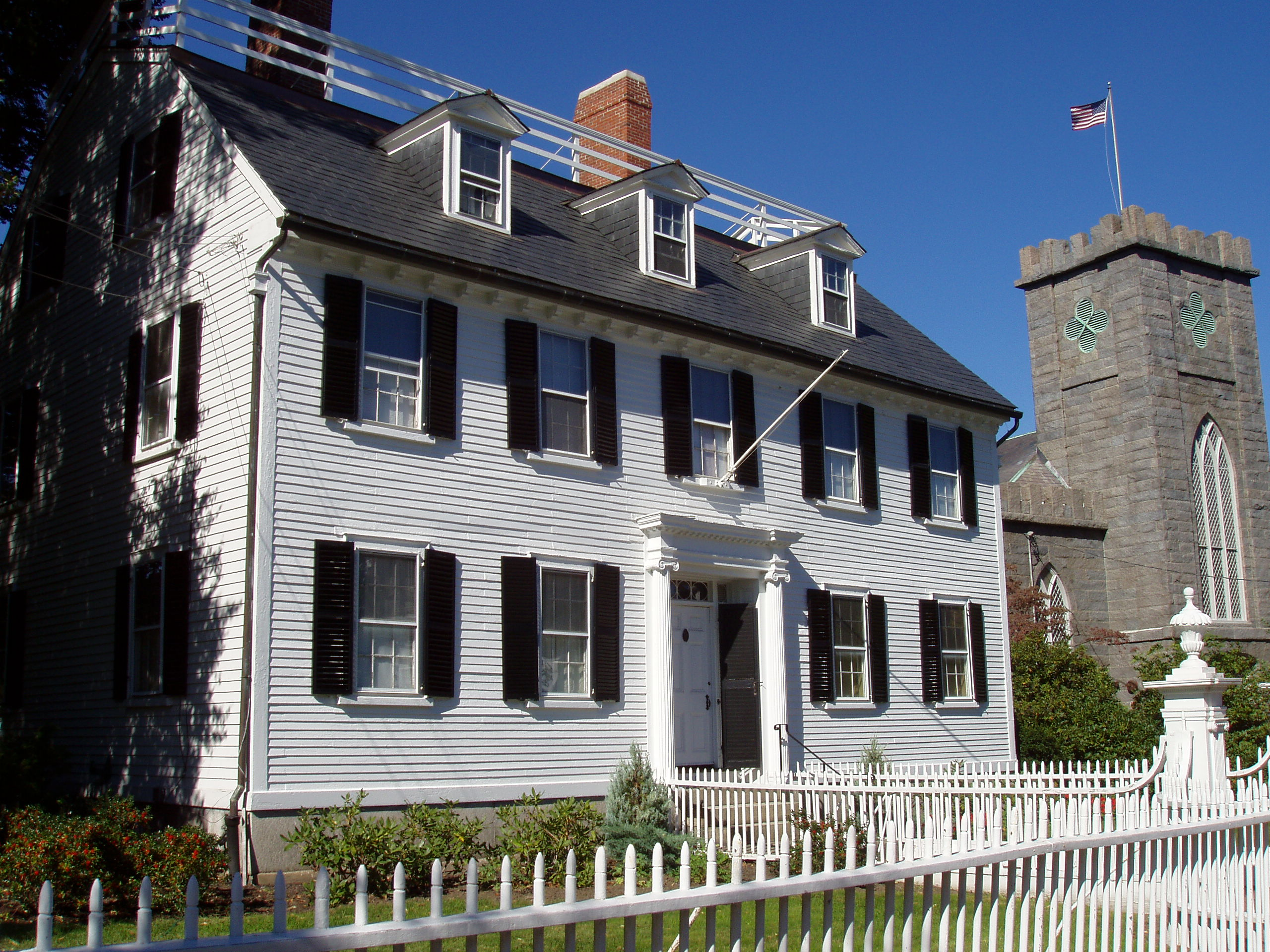
- The Ropes Mansion, with First Unitarian Church in the background

- Location within Massachusetts

General information
- Type: House
- Architectural style: Georgian
- Location: Salem, Massachusetts, 318 Essex Street
- Coordinates: 42.5212°N 70.8998°W
- Completed: c. 1727 (PEM) c. 1729 (MACRIS) (Note: This date is included in the 1997 NRHP nomination. Interestingly, this is also when the residence was owned by the Peabody Essex Museum.)

Website
- www.pem.org/historic-houses/ropes-mansion

The Nathaniel Ropes Mansion (commonly referred to as Ropes Mansion), is a Georgian Colonial mansion located at 318 Essex Street in Salem, Massachusetts. As no published dendrochronology study has been conducted, the exact build date of this home is up for debate. It is generally agreed upon by historians that the mansion dates to the late 1720s. Major alterations since then include the Ionic style entrance, and rear ell which were added during the 19th century. The residence was also moved back from Essex Street at this time due to possible road widening. In the early 20th century, the Ropes Mansion was given to the "Trustees of the Ropes Memorial", who built the garden in the rear of the house. The residence is now operated by the Peabody Essex Museum, which gives seasonal self-guided house tours.

== History ==
Now known as the "Ropes mansion", this house was first constructed in the late 1720s for merchant Samuel Barnard from Deerfield. As built, the house was sheathed in wood clapboards, consisted of 2.5 stories with 5 × 2-bay windows, and was capped by a slate-shingled, gambrel roof. Barnard was a survivor of an Indian raid which occurred in Deerfield on February 29, 1704 and lived there until 1720. With his wife and infant son since deceased, he moved to Salem and married his second wife Rachel, who was the widow of his cousin Thomas Barnard. Samuel Barnard prospered as a merchant in Salem and was a wealthy individual when the "Ropes mansion" was built for him. Barnard would up outliving 3 of his 4 wives when he died in 1762, and the house eventually fell out of the family when it was sold by his nephew to Judge Nathaniel Ropes in 1768.

Ropes graduated Harvard University in 1745 with a degree in law and started out as a lawyer. He was a representative of Salem in the colonial legislature in 1760 and 1761, and served on the Governor's Council from 1762 to 1768. He was also a judge on the Inferior Court of Common Pleas and a judge of probate until 1772, when he was appointed as a justice on the Superior Court of Judicature. Ropes was soon brought into controversy over how judges were paid at the time. Although he was acquainted with patriots such as John Adams, an issue remained where he still held loyalist views. Just before or during the Revolutionary War a mob is said to have raged outside of the house to protest his loyalist ties. In one of the traditional narratives, this event takes place in March 1774 when Ropes was on his deathbed with smallpox. The mob was supposedly a contributing factor as he died the following day. As the house subsequently passed through generations of the Ropes family the interior of the structure was extensively renovated in 1807. The central entrance with "fluted Ionic columns" also dates to sometime around 1830 when five interior rooms and the central hall were remodeled.

Major changes to the Ropes Mansion occurred in 1894 when an ell was added and the residence was moved back from Essex Street. Proposals for an addition can be traced back to 1881 and 1884 through two building permits, while the first is unspecified the latter mentions a two-story, 8' × 15' addition. When the house was enlarged towards the rear, a 2.5-story kitchen and service ell was added instead along with a large single story rear wing. Changes also included modernization of the house through electricity and plumbing, interior modifications made in the Colonial Revival style, and the exterior white wooden fence which now occupies the front yard. The Ropes family inhabited the house until 1907 with the death of the last of 3 sisters. In their will they bequeathed the house to the "Essex Institute" for "the purpose of establishing a free school of botany", and as a memorial to their family. A dirt path to the east of the house now leads to a latticed arbor and formal garden which was laid out in 1912. The "Essex Institute" eventually merged with the Peabody Essex Museum in 1992. At present, the Ropes Mansion is now a museum owned by the latter which gives seasonal self-guided house tours. These are capped by only allowing a certain number of people in the mansion at a given time.

== In popular culture ==
The Ropes Mansion was featured in the 1993 Disney film Hocus Pocus where one of the main characters named Allison lives. It has since been nicknamed "Alison's House" by fans of the film as a reference.

== See also ==
- The Witch House – also on Essex Street
- List of historic houses in Massachusetts
