= Andrew–Safford House =

Coordinates: 42°31′23″N 70°53′27″W

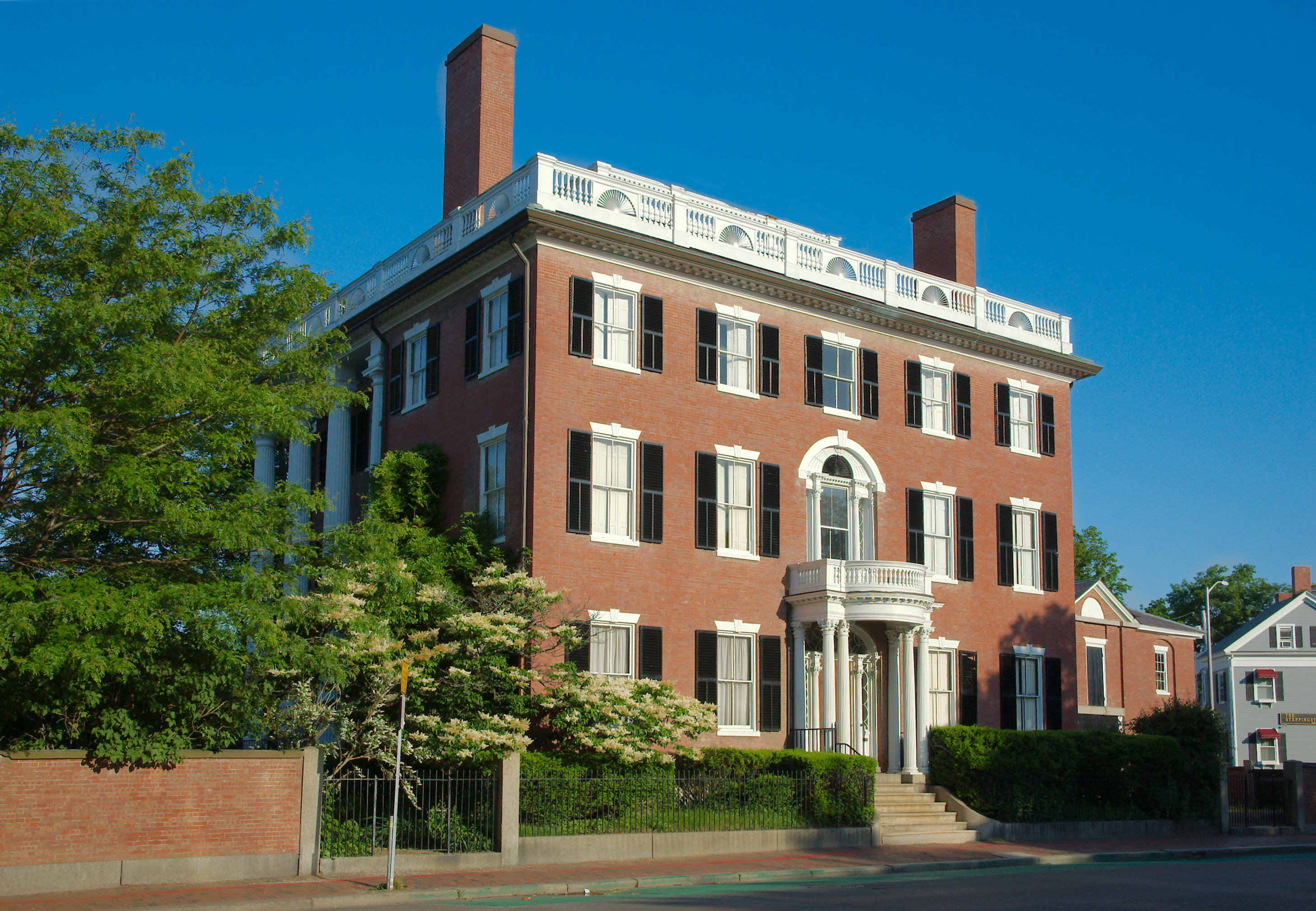
The Andrew-Safford House at 13 Washington Square

Owned by the Peabody Essex Museum, the Andrew–Safford House (13 Washington Square). Built in 1819 and was designed in the Federal style by an unknown architect for a wealthy Russian fur merchant. It is reputed to have been the most costly house erected in New England at the time. The massive vertical façade and the four large columns rising from the ground to the third story on the south side make this one of the most impressive houses in Salem. The house is a contributing property to the Essex Institute Historic District, listed in the National Register of Historic Places.

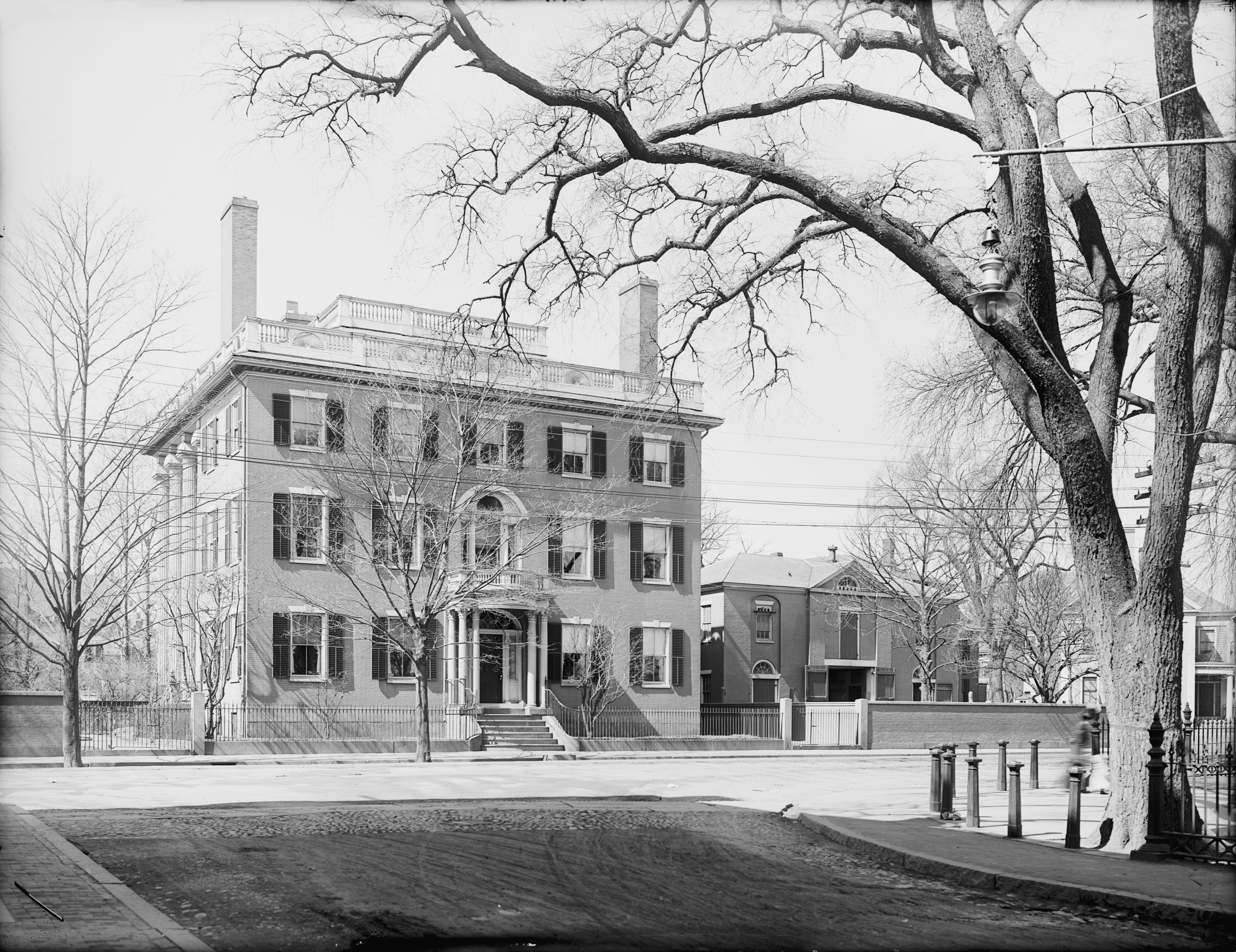
View of the house c. 1910

== See also ==
- List of historic houses in Massachusetts

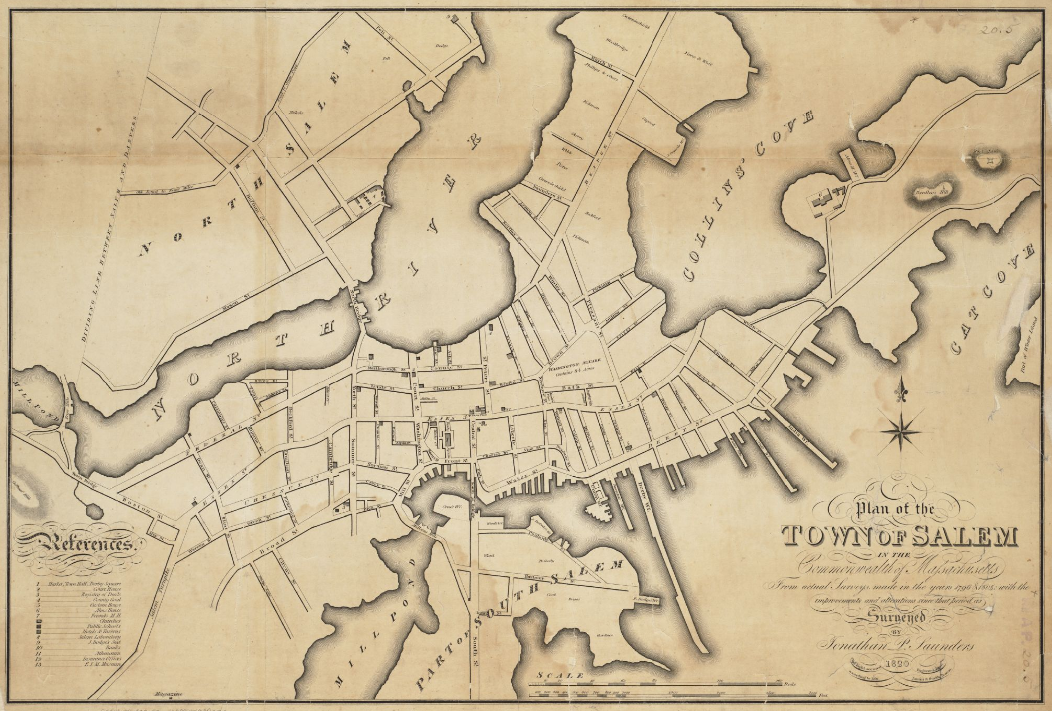
Salem - 1820
