= Charles Osgood (artist) =

American painter

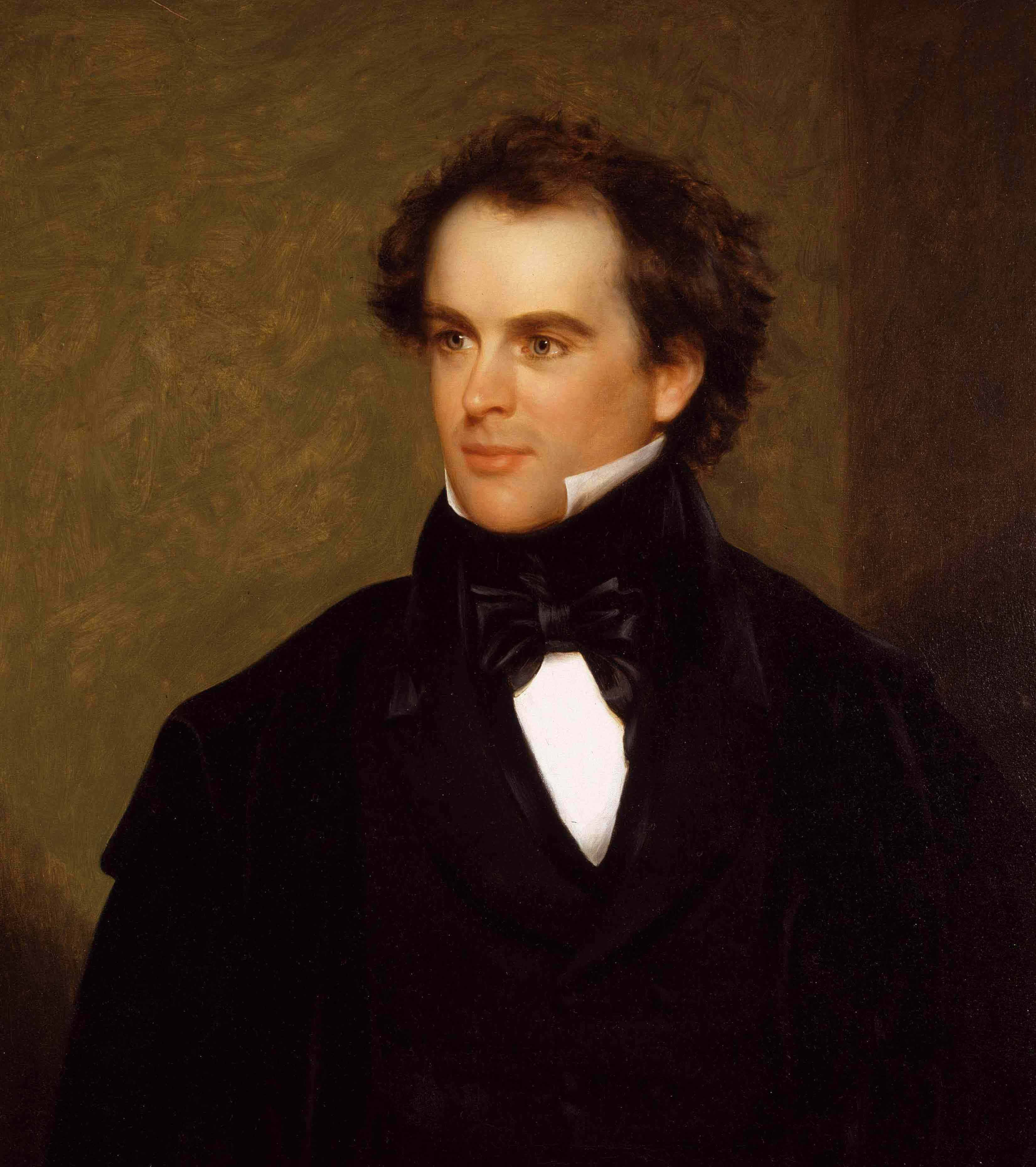
Portrait of Nathaniel Hawthorne by Charles Osgood, 1841 (Peabody Essex Museum)

Charles Osgood (1809–1890) was an American artist from Salem, Massachusetts, who also worked briefly in Boston and New York City. Examples of his work are in the American Antiquarian Society, Historic New England, Harvard University, Massachusetts Historical Society, and Peabody Essex Museum.
