= Count Orlok's Nightmare Gallery =

Horror movie museum in Salem, MA

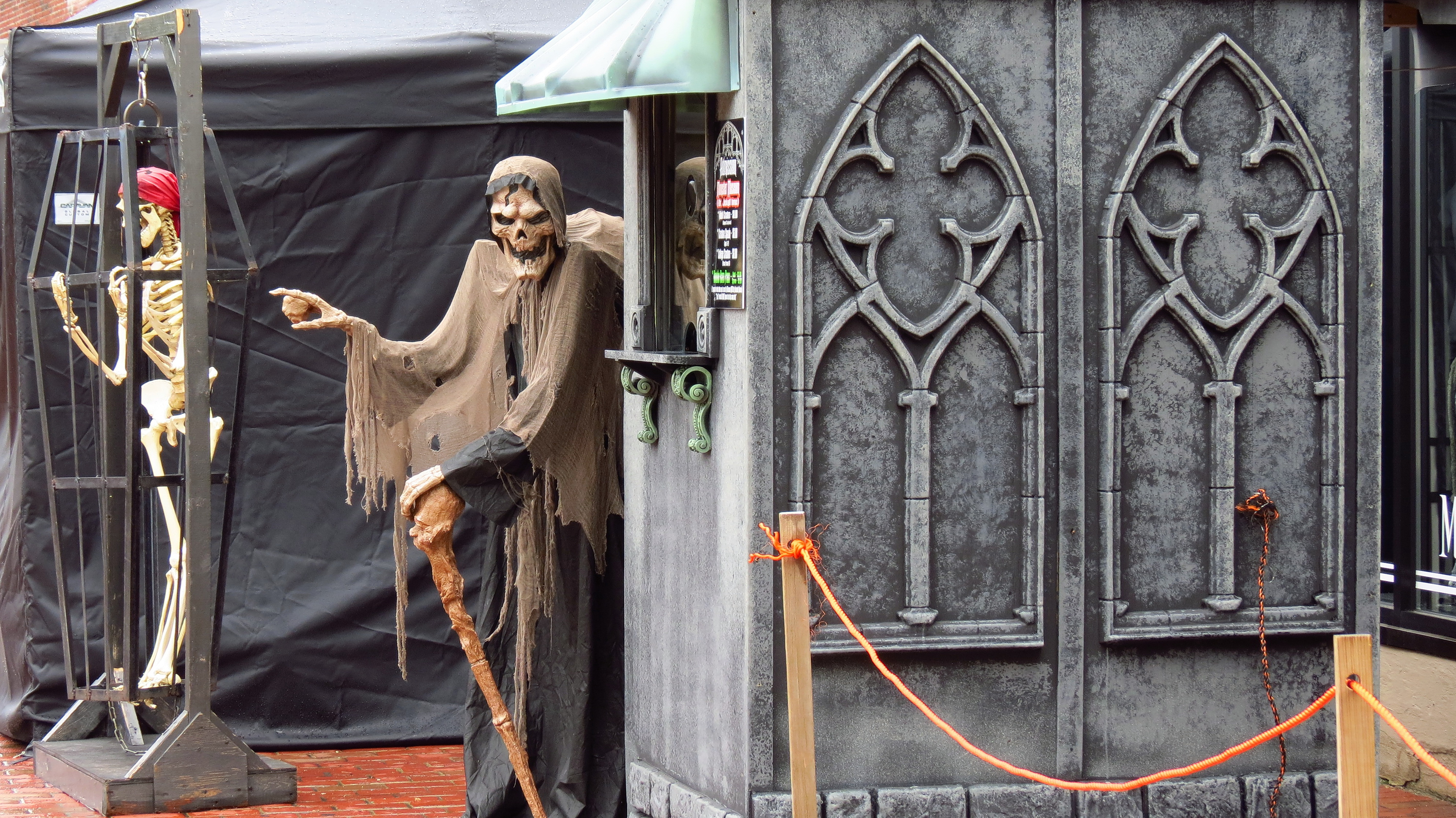
- The Nightmare Gallery at its previous location at 285 Derby St, Salem, MA
- Coordinates: 42.5213°N 70.8949°W
- Type: Horror film memorabilia and sculpture
- Website: www.nightmaregallery.com

Count Orlok's Nightmare Gallery is a horror film museum in Salem, Massachusetts. The collection is owned by James Lurgio and includes life-sized sculptures of several horror movie monsters, as well as movie props and life masks of various horror actors and directors.

== History ==
The museum opened in September 2007, with the collection previously being displayed at the Bayside Expo Center in 2005.

In 2015, two thefts occurred at the museum. An unidentified woman and man stole a metal hat and the hand of a mummy figurine, respectively, on two separate occasions.

Though initially hosted on Derby Street, the collection was moved to a new location on Essex Street in 2021.

== Collection ==
The gallery begins with a display themed around the titular Count Orlok of Nosferatu, before following the films featured in a rough chronological order. Character figurines range from Universal monsters to slasher movie villains. Life masks of actors such as Bela Lugosi and directors such as Alfred Hitchcock are also displayed.
