= Salem, Massachusetts =

- City
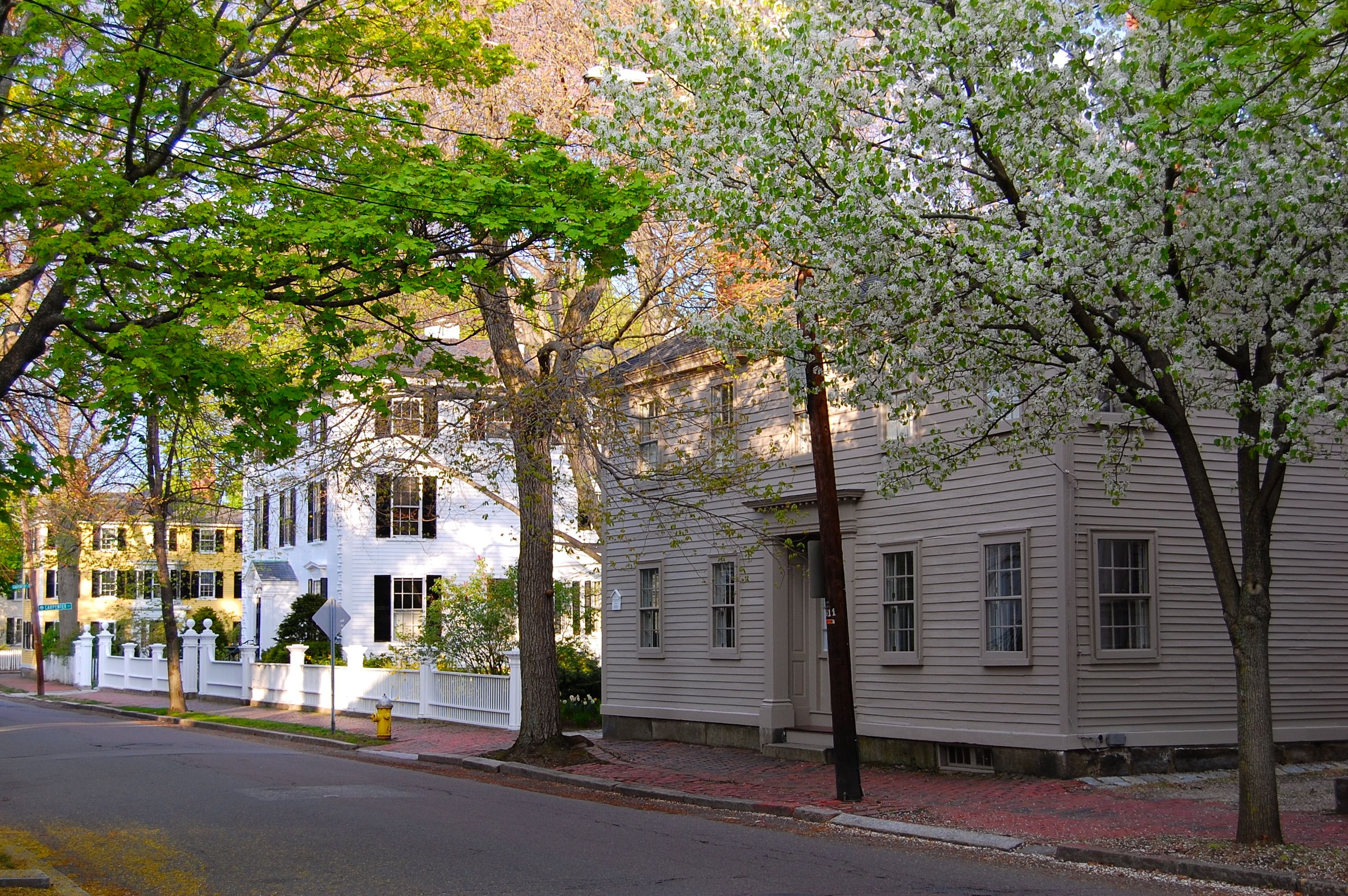
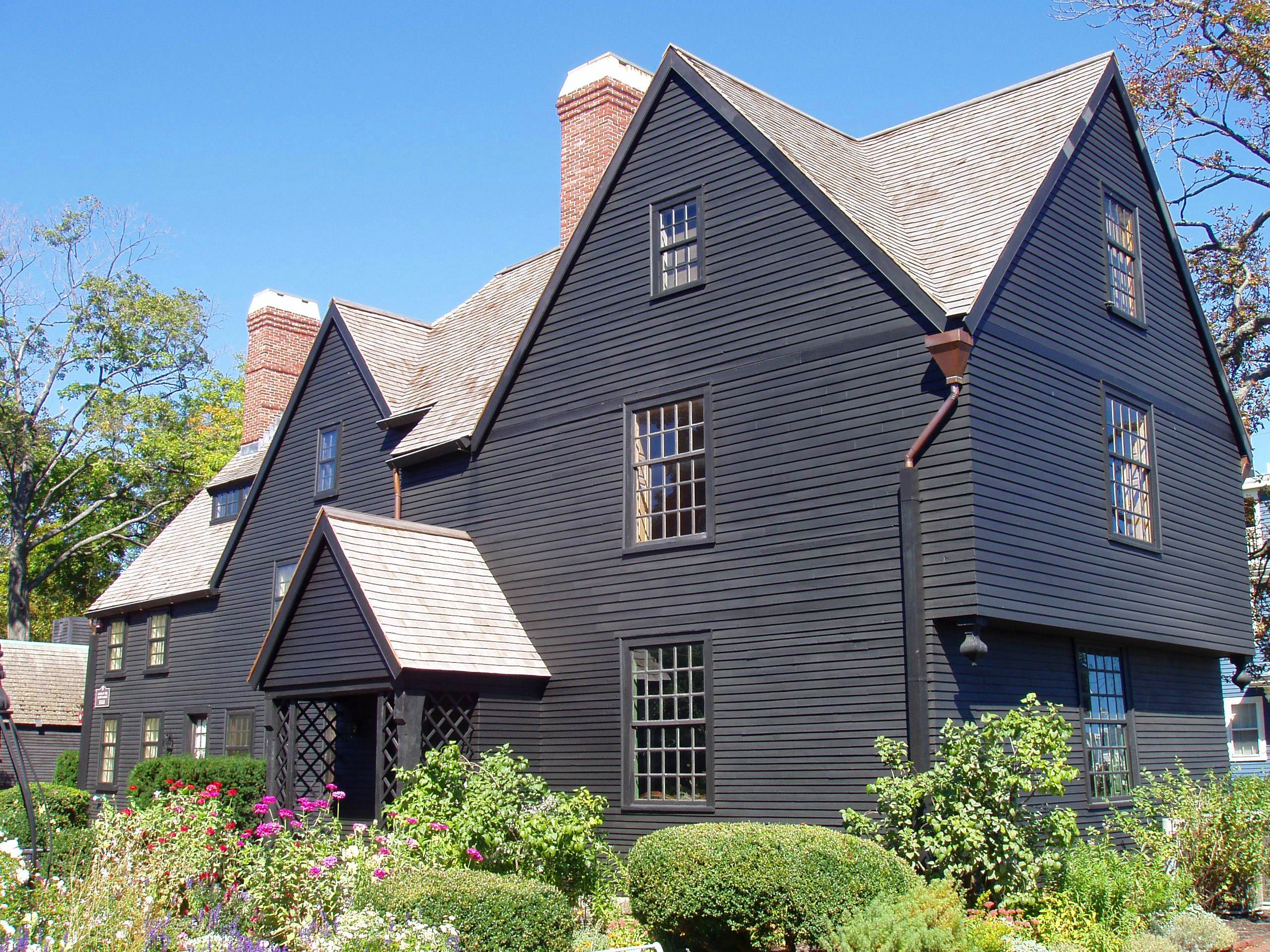
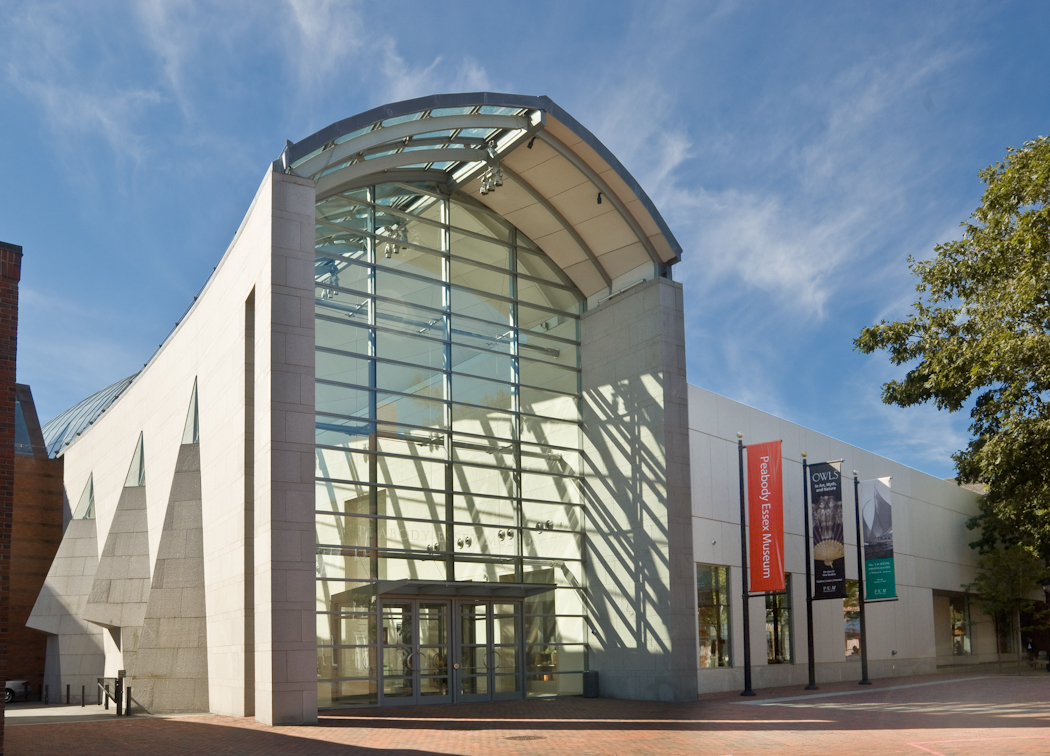
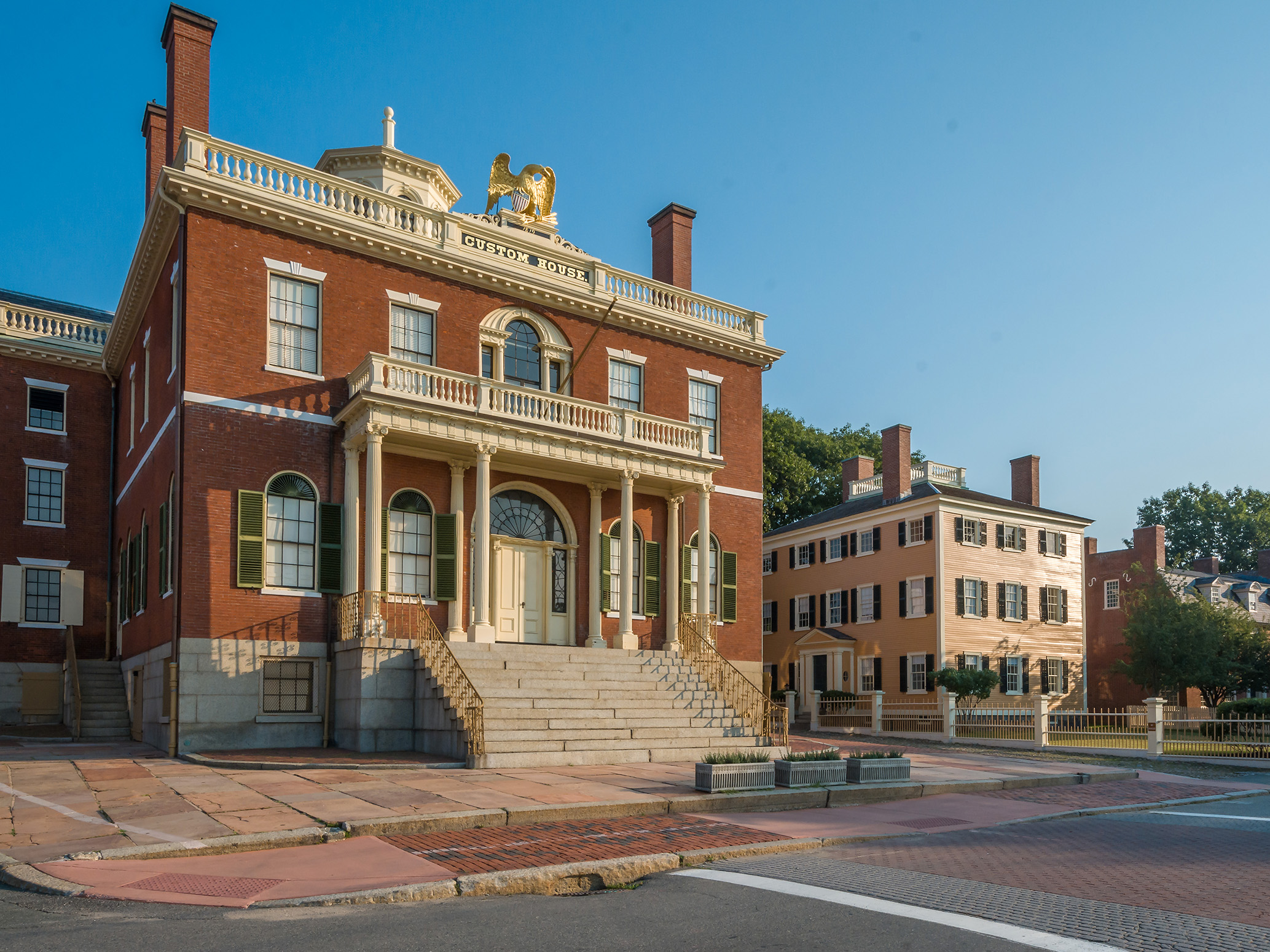
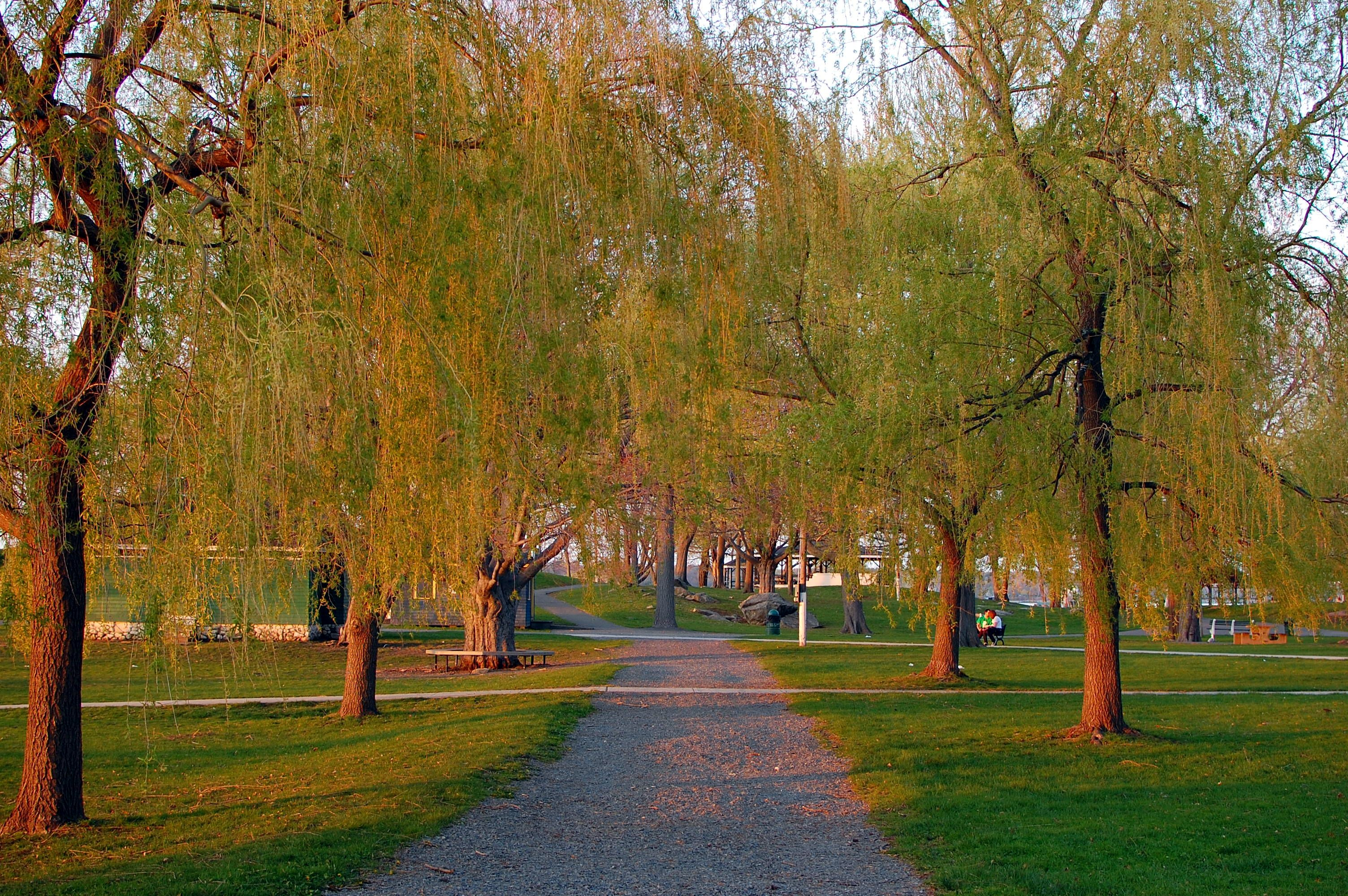
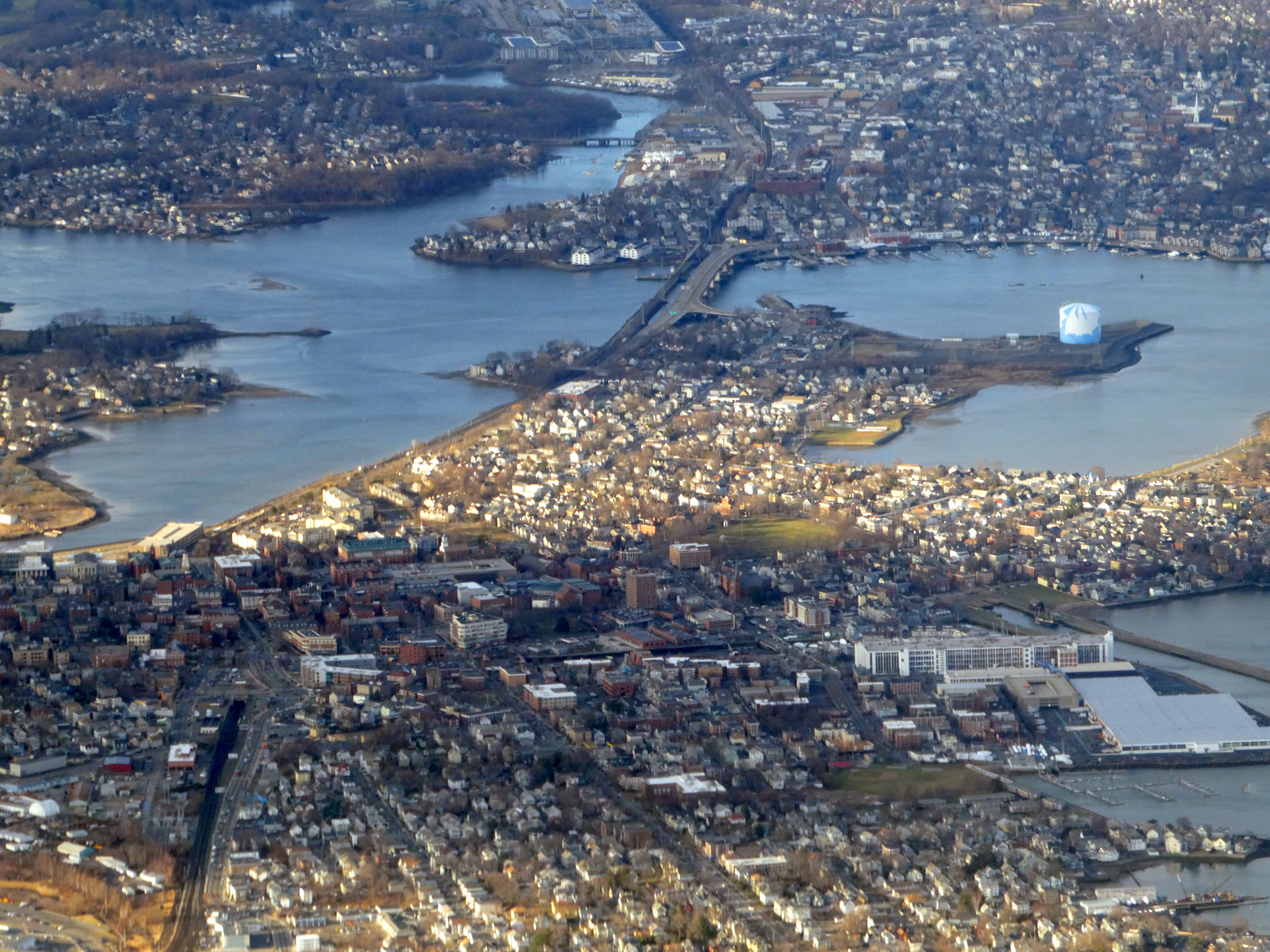
- Federal Street District House of the Seven Gables Peabody Essex Museum Salem Maritime National Historic Site Salem Willows Downtown Salem

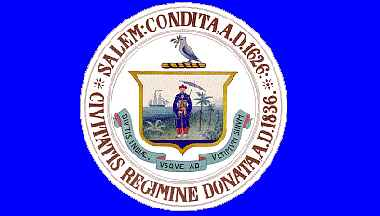
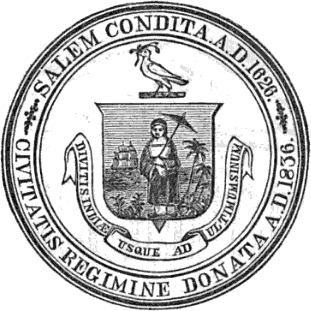
- Flag Seal
- Nicknames: The Witch City, The City of Witches, Pleasure City
- Motto: Divitis Indiae usque ad ultimum sinum (Latin: To the farthest port of the rich Indies)
- Interactive map of Salem, Massachusetts
- Location within Massachusetts Location within the United States
- Coordinates: 42°31′10″N 70°53′50″W
- Country: United States
- State: Massachusetts
- County: Essex
- Settled: 1626
- Incorporated: 1629
- City: 1836
- Founder: Roger Conant

Government
  - Type: Mayor-council city
  - Mayor: Dominick Pangallo (D)

Area
  - Total: 18.30 sq mi (47.40 km^{2})
  - Land: 8.29 sq mi (21.48 km^{2})
  - Water: 10.01 sq mi (25.92 km^{2})
- Elevation: 26 ft (8 m)

Population (2020)
  - Total: 44,480
  - Density: 5,363.0/sq mi (2,070.66/km^{2})
- Time zone: UTC−5 (Eastern)
  - Summer (DST): UTC−4 (Eastern)
- ZIP Code: 01970
- Area codes: 351, 978
- FIPS code: 25-59105
- GNIS feature ID: 0614337
- Website: salemma.gov

Salem (/ˈseɪ.ləm/, SAY-ləm) is a historic coastal city in Essex County, Massachusetts, United States, located on the North Shore of Greater Boston. Continuous settlement by Europeans began in 1626 with English colonists. Salem was one of the most significant seaports for trading commodities in early American history. Prior to the dissolution of county governments in Massachusetts in 1999, it served as one of two county seats for Essex County, alongside Lawrence.

Today, Salem is a residential and tourist area that is home to the House of Seven Gables, Salem State University, Pioneer Village, the Salem Maritime National Historic Site, Salem Willows Park, and the Peabody Essex Museum. It features historic residential neighborhoods in the Federal Street District and the Charter Street Historic District. The city's population was 44,480 at the 2020 census.

Salem is most well-known for the Salem witch trials of 1692, which strongly informs the city's cultural identity into the present. Some of Salem's police cars are adorned with witch logos, a public elementary school is known as Witchcraft Heights, and the Salem High School athletic teams are named the Witches. The top of Gallows Hill was believed to be the site of the executions during the Witch Trials, but in 2016 a site near the foot of the hill, called Proctor's Ledge, was identified as the site for the public hangings. Gallows Hill now serves as a city park and the Ledge was made a memorial. Salem is also the birthplace of the National Guard, which first mustered at the Salem Common in 1636. In the 19th century, the Salem area became the subject of American Literature, particularly in the writings of Nathaniel Hawthorne.

== History ==
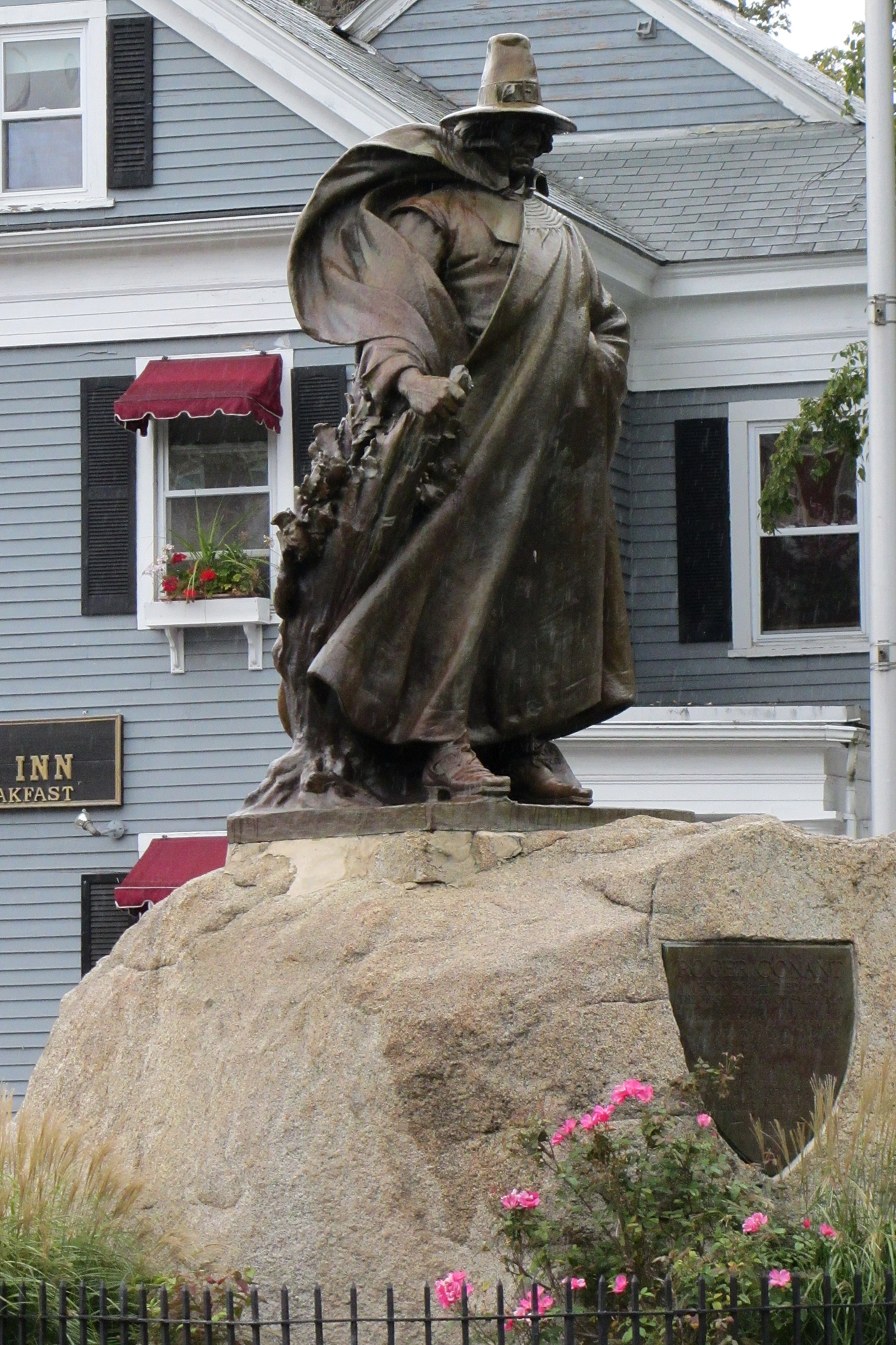
Statue of Roger Conant, founder of Salem

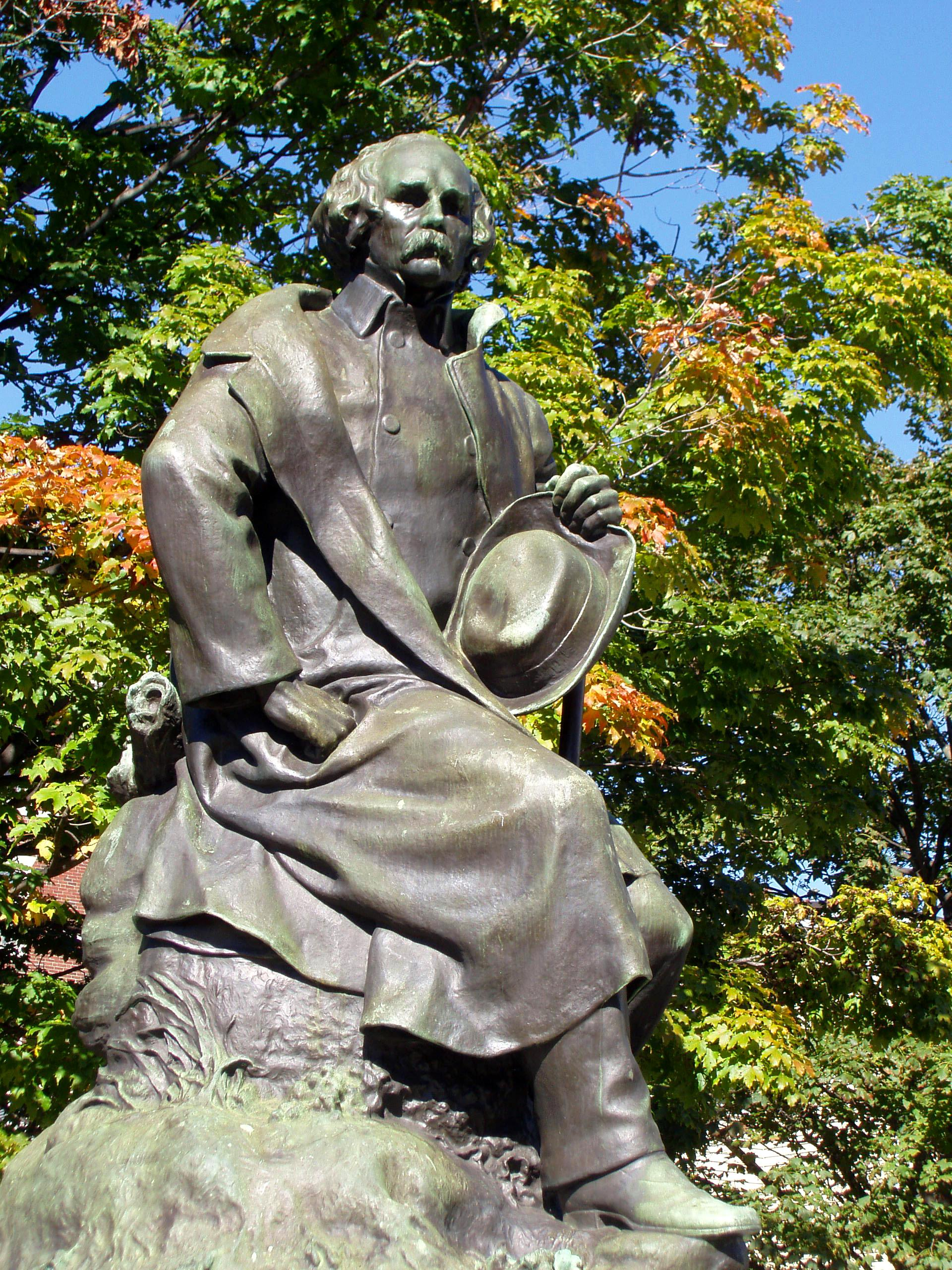
Nathaniel Hawthorne by Bela Pratt

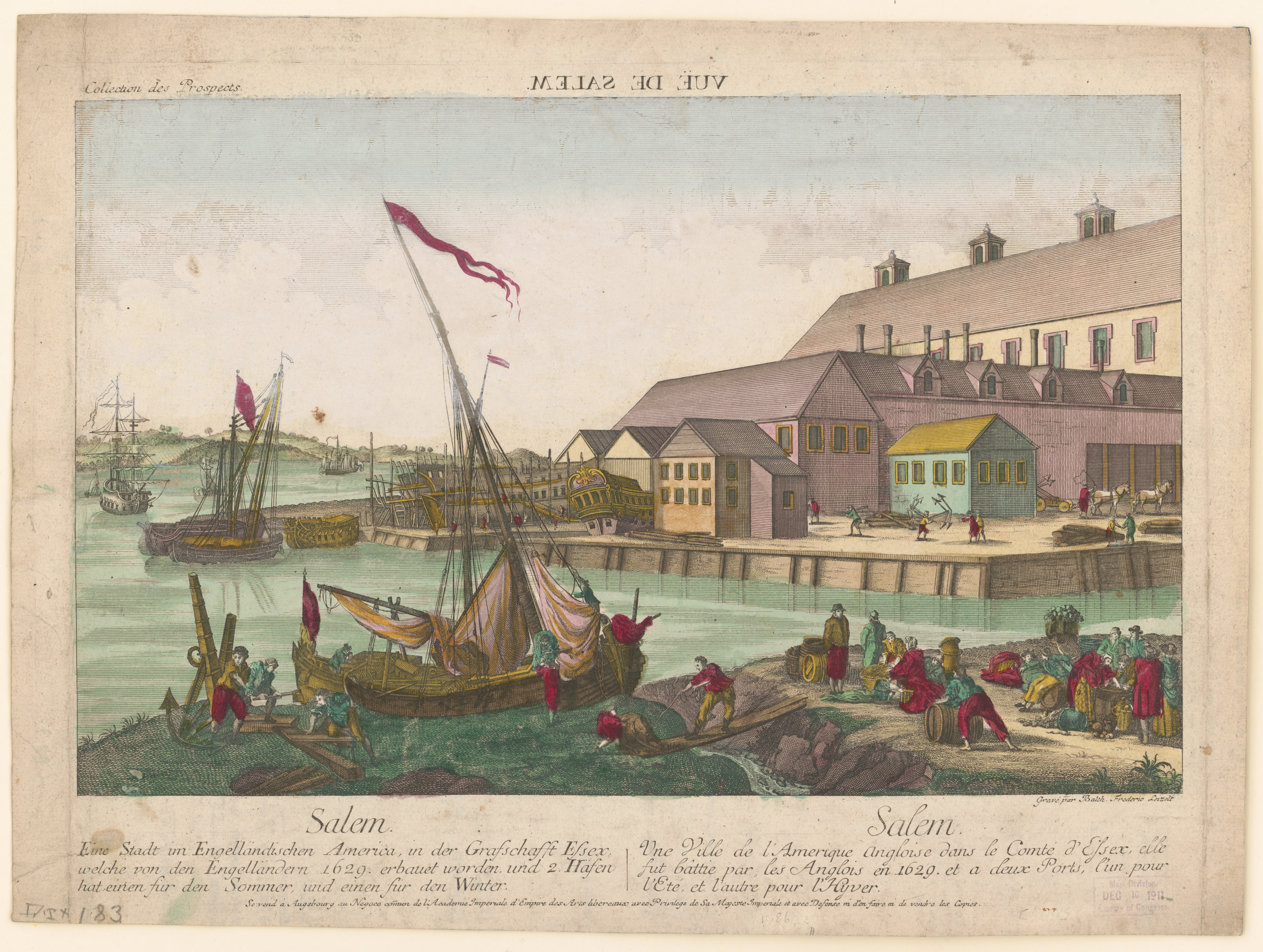
Scene along the Salem waterfront, c. 1770–1780

=== Naumkeag ===
Native Americans lived in northeastern Massachusetts for thousands of years prior to European colonization of the Americas. The peninsula that would become Salem was known as Naumkeag (alternate spellings Naemkeck, Nahumkek, Neumkeage) by the Native people who lived there at the time of contact in the early 1600s. Naumkeag was a major settlement for the Indigenous group that controlled territory from the Merrimack to the Mystic rivers. The English and other Europeans referred to them as the Naumkeag people. There are probable Indigenous settlement sites near the mouths of the North, South, and Forest rivers in Salem.

The contact period was a disastrous time for the Naumkeag. Many Naumkeag died in a war with the Tarrantine and as a result of a smallpox epidemic in 1617–1619, including their powerful sachem Nanepashemet. The disease had probably been contracted by members who came into contact with European fishermen or explorers. Their strength was reduced just prior to the arrival of English settlers in 1626 to what became modern-day Salem. In 1633, a second smallpox epidemic struck, killing two of Nanepashemet's successors, Montowompate and Wonohaquaham, and leaving his remaining heir Wenepoykin scarred. So it was that English settlers met little resistance on their arrival in Salem. Although Wenepoykin would join Metacomet in King Philip's War in 1675, the English settlers at this point had the numerical superiority to defeat Metacomet's Indigenous coalition.

It was not until 1686, when the Massachusetts Bay Colony Charter was recalled by King James II in the creation of the Dominion of New England that Wenepoykin's heirs pressed their claim to the land of Salem, for which they were paid twenty pounds.

=== English colonization ===
Colonists settled in Naumkeag in 1626 when a company of fishermen arrived from Cape Ann led by Roger Conant. Conant's leadership provided the stability for the settlers to survive the first two years, but John Endecott replaced him by order of the Massachusetts Bay Company. Conant stepped aside and was granted 200 acres (0.81 km^{2}) of land in compensation. These "New Planters" and the "Old Planters" agreed to cooperate because of the diplomacy of Conant and Endecott. To recognize this peaceful transition to the new government, the name of the settlement was changed to Salem, the hellenized name of Shalem (שָׁלֵם), the royal city of Melchizedek, which is identified with Jerusalem.

In 1628, Endecott ordered that the Great House be moved from Cape Ann, reassembling it on Washington Street north of Church Street. Francis Higginson wrote that "we found a faire house newly built for the Governor" which was remarkable for being two stories high. A year later, the Massachusetts Bay Charter was issued creating the Massachusetts Bay Colony with Matthew Craddock as its governor in London and Endecott as its governor in the colony. John Winthrop was elected Governor in late 1629, and arrived with the Winthrop Fleet in 1630, one of the many events that began the Puritan Great Migration.

In 1639, Endecott, among others, signed the building contract for enlarging the meeting house in Town House Square for the first church in Salem. This document remains part of the town records at City Hall. He was active in the affairs of the town throughout his life. Samuel Skelton was the first pastor of the First Church of Salem, which is the original Puritan church in America. Endecott already had a close relationship with Skelton, having been converted by him, and Endecott considered him as his spiritual father.

Salem's harbor was defended by Fort Miller in Marblehead from 1632 to 1865, and by Fort Pickering on Winter Island from 1643 to 1865. During the 17th and 18th centuries, Salem was involved in the Atlantic slave trade, surpassing Boston in terms of the town's engagement with the triangular trade. Beginning in 1701 there was a steady political and social effort in Massachusetts to end slavery and by 1770 the practice was all but eliminated, with many slaves winning their freedom.

In 1768, Samuel Hall established Salem's first print shop and founded The Essex Gazette Salem's first newspaper, and the third to emerge in Massachusetts.

=== Witchcraft Trials ===
One of the most widely known aspects of Salem is its history of witchcraft allegations, which started with Abigail Williams, Betty Parris, and their friends playing "with a Venus glase & an Egg" to learn "what trade their sweet harts should be of." The infamous Salem witch trials began in 1692, and 19 people were executed by hanging because of the false accusations; Giles Corey was pressed to death for refusing to plead innocent or guilty, thus avoiding the noose and instead dying an innocent man. Salem is also significant in legal history as the site of the Dorothy Talbye Trial, where a mentally ill woman was hanged for murdering her daughter because Massachusetts made no distinction at the time between insanity and criminal behavior.

William Hathorne was a prosperous entrepreneur in early Salem and became one of its leading citizens. He led troops to victory in King Philip's War, served as a magistrate on the highest court, and was chosen as the first speaker of the House of Deputies. He was a zealous advocate of the personal rights of freemen against royal emissaries and agents. His son Judge John Hathorne came to prominence in the late 17th century when witchcraft was a serious felony. Judge Hathorne is the best known of the witch trial judges, and he became known as the "Hanging Judge" for sentencing accused witches to death.

=== American Revolution ===
On February 26, 1775, patriots raised the drawbridge at the North River on North Street, preventing British Colonel Alexander Leslie and his 300 troops of the 64th Regiment of Foot from seizing stores and ammunition hidden in North Salem. Both parties came to an agreement and no blood was shed that day, but war broke out at Lexington and Concord soon after. A group of prominent merchants with ties to Salem published a statement retracting what some interpreted as Loyalist leanings and professing their dedication to the American cause, including Francis Cabot, William Pynchon, Thomas Barnard, E. A. Holyoke, and William Pickman.

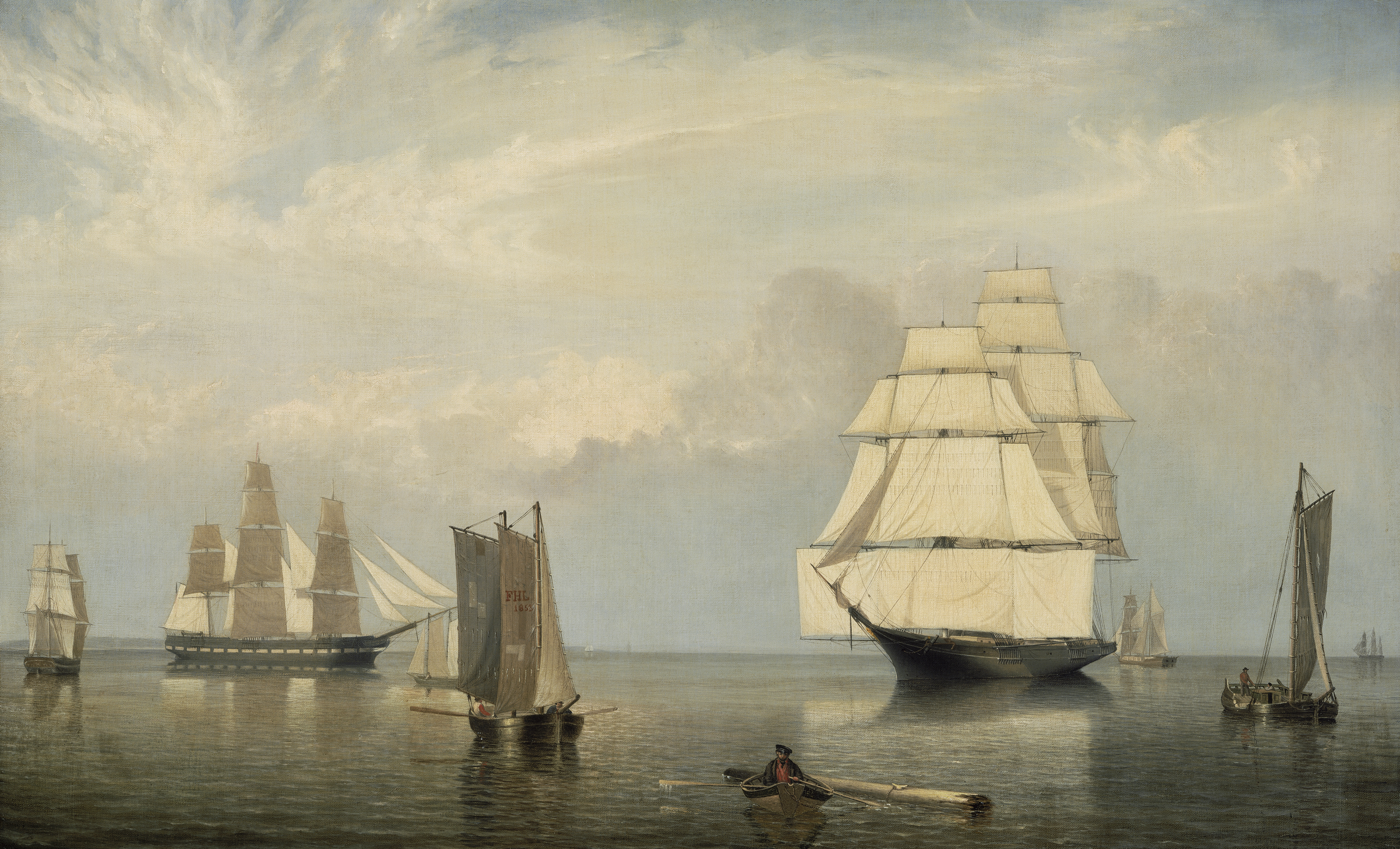
Salem Harbor, oil on canvas, Fitz Henry Lane, 1853, Museum of Fine Arts, Boston

Given the local port and shipping fleet, during the American Revolutionary War, the town became a center for privateering. The documentation is incomplete, but about 1,700 Letters of Marque were granted during that time, issued on a per-voyage basis. Nearly 800 vessels were commissioned as privateers and are credited with capturing or destroying about 600 British ships. Privateering resumed during the War of 1812.

=== Trade with the Pacific and Africa ===
Following the American Revolution, many ships used as privateers were too large for short voyages in the coasting trade, and their owners determined to open new avenues of trade to distant countries. The young men of the town, fresh from service on the armed ships of Salem, were eager to embark in such ventures. Captain Nathaniel Silsbee, his first mate Charles Derby, and second mate Richard J. Cleveland were not yet twenty years old when they set sail on a nineteen-month voyage that was perhaps the first from the newly independent America to the East Indies. In 1795, Captain Jonathan Carnes set sail for Sumatra in the Malay Archipelago on his secret voyage for pepper. Nothing was heard from him until eighteen months later, when he entered Salem harbor with a cargo of pepper in bulk, the first to be so imported into the country, and which sold at the extraordinary profit of seven hundred per cent. The Empress of China, formerly a privateer, was refitted as the first American ship to sail from New York to China.

By 1790, Salem had become the sixth-largest city in the country, and a world-famous seaport—particularly in the China Trade. It had a large cod fishing industry, conducted off the Newfoundland Banks. It exported codfish to Europe and the West Indies, imported sugar and molasses from the West Indies, tea from China, and products depicted on the city seal from the East Indies—in particular Sumatran pepper. Salem ships also visited Africa in the slave trade—Zanzibar in particular. They also traveled to Russia, Japan, and Australia.

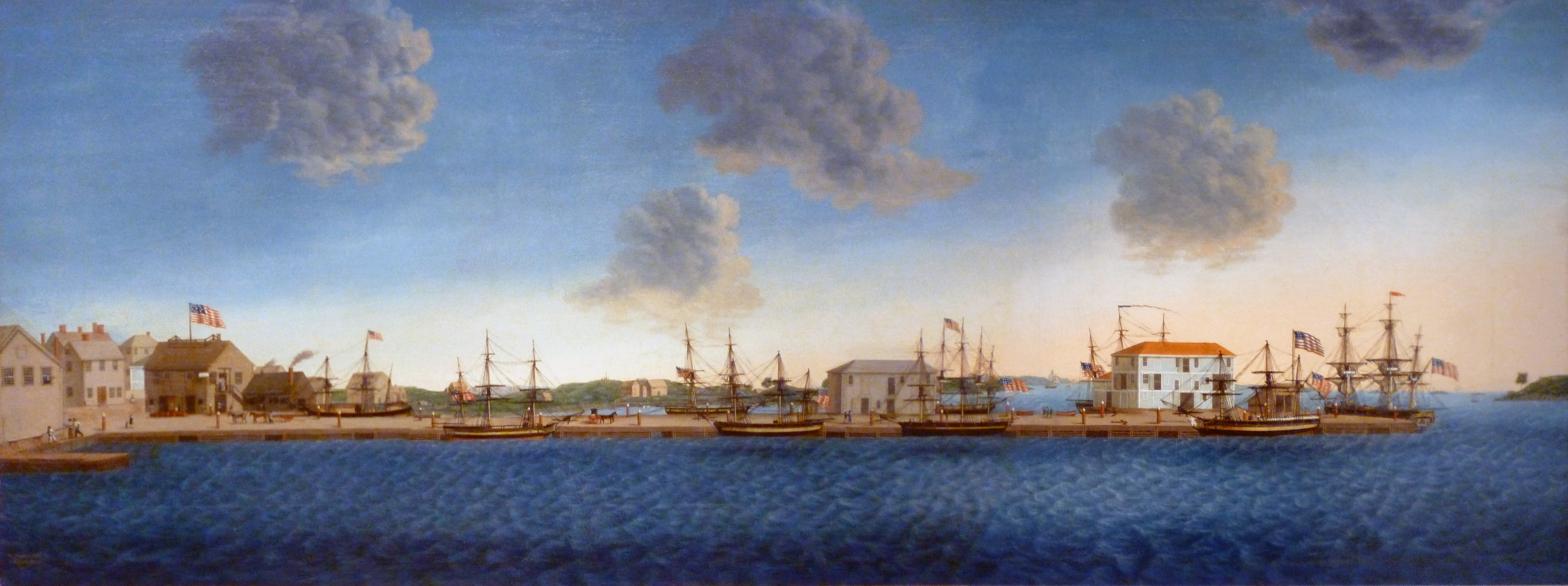
Crowninshield's Wharf at Salem, painting by George Ropes. Ropes, a mute, was the son of a sea captain and the nephew of prominent Salem ship owner Jerathmiel Peirce. This painting is in the collection of the Peabody Essex Museum.

The sail frigate USS Essex was built at one of Enos Briggs's shipyards on Winter Island in 1799.

The neutrality of the United States was tested during the Napoleonic Wars. After the Chesapeake–Leopard affair, Congress passed the Embargo Act of 1807. President Thomas Jefferson closed all ports, an economic blow to the seaport town of Salem. The embargo was the starting point on the path to the War of 1812. Both the United Kingdom and France imposed trade restrictions to weaken each other's economies. This disrupted American trade and tested the United States' neutrality. Royal Navy ships frequently interdicted U.S. merchant ships trading with France and seized their goods, and at times would impress American sailors.

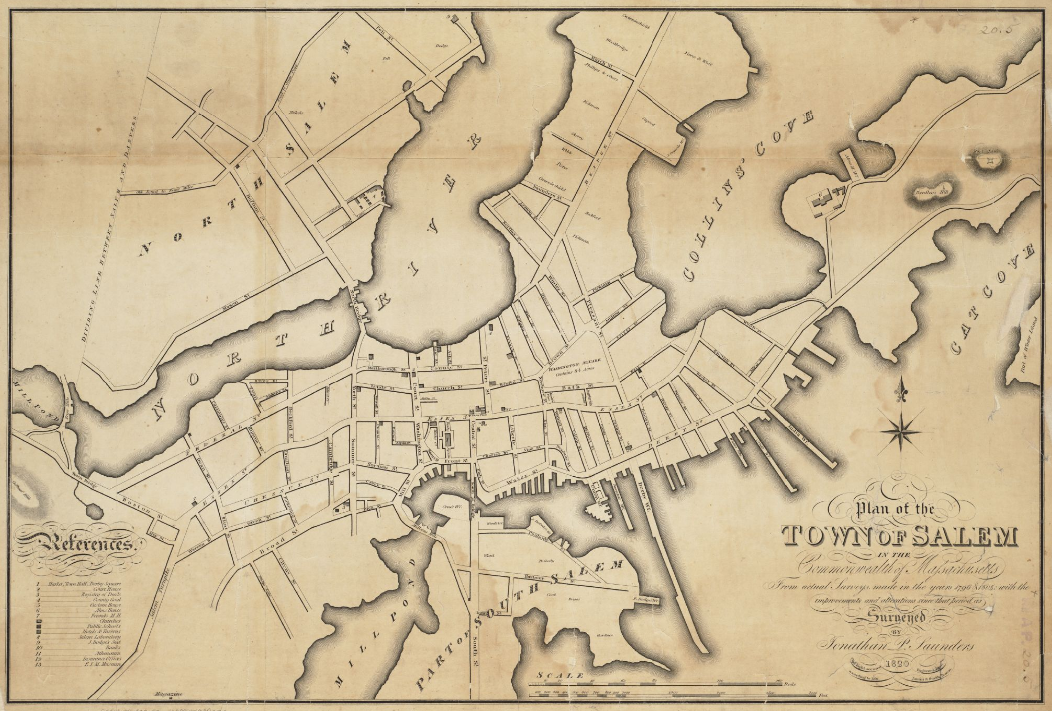
Map of Salem, c. 1820

The Federal period (1788–1845) marks the beginning of U.S. international relations. Salem had established trade relations with merchants in distant lands, which were a source of livelihood and prosperity for many. Charles Endicott, master of Salem merchantman Friendship, returned in 1831 to report native Sumatran people had plundered his ship, murdering the first officer and two crewmen. Following public outcry, President Andrew Jackson ordered the Potomac on the First Sumatran Expedition, which departed New York City on August 19, 1831.

In another direction, diplomat Edmund Roberts negotiated a treaty with Said bin Sultan, Sultan of Muscat and Oman on September 21, 1833. In 1837, the sultan moved his main place of residence to Zanzibar and welcomed Richard Waters, a resident of Salem, as a United States consul of the early years.

=== Legacy of the East Indies and Old China Trade ===
The Old China Trade left a significant mark in two historic districts, Chestnut Street District, part of the Samuel McIntire Historic District containing 407 buildings, and the Salem Maritime National Historic Site, comprising 12 historic structures and about 9 acres (36,000 m^{2}) of land along the waterfront in Salem. Elias Hasket Derby was among the wealthiest and most celebrated of post-Revolutionary merchants in Salem. Derby was also the owner of the Grand Turk, the first New England vessel to trade with China and the second, after the Empress of China, to sail from the United States. Thomas H. Perkins was his supercargo and established strong ties with the Chinese and garnered the Forbes fortune through his illegal opium sales.

Salem was incorporated as a city on March 23, 1836, and adopted a city seal in 1839 with the motto "Divitis Indiae usque ad ultimum sinum", Latin for "To the farthest point of the rich East." Nathaniel Hawthorne was overseer of Salem's port from 1846 until 1849. He worked in the U.S. Custom House across the street from the port near Pickering Wharf, his setting for the beginning of The Scarlet Letter. In 1858, an amusement park was established at Juniper Point, a peninsula jutting into the harbor. Prosperity left the city with a wealth of fine architecture, including Federal-style mansions designed by one of America's first architects, Samuel McIntire, for whom the city's largest historic district is named. These homes and mansions now make up the greatest concentrations of notable pre-1900 domestic structures in the United States.

Shipping declined throughout the 19th century. Boston and New York City eclipsed Salem and its silting harbor. Consequently, the city turned to manufacturing. Industries included tanneries, shoe factories, and the Naumkeag Steam Cotton Company. The Great Salem Fire of 1914 destroyed over 400 homes and left 3,500 families homeless but spared the historic concentration of Federal architecture on Chestnut Street. A memorial plaque on a drugstore building marks the former site of the Korn Leather Factory, which burned in the fire.

=== Air Station and the National Guard ===
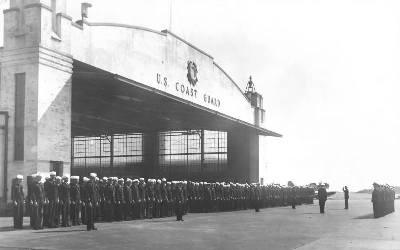
Coast Guard Air Station Salem, 1952

Coast Guard Air Station Salem was established on February 15, 1935, when the United States Coast Guard opened a new seaplane facility in Salem because there was no space to expand the Gloucester Air Station at Ten Pound Island. Coast Guard Air Station Salem was located on Winter Island, an extension of Salem Neck which juts out into Salem Harbor. Search and rescue, hunting for derelicts, and medical evacuations were the station's primary areas of responsibility. During its first year of operation, Salem crews performed 26 medical evacuations. They flew in all kinds of weather, and the radio direction capabilities of the aircraft were of significant value in locating vessels in distress.

During World War II (1939–1945), air crews from Salem flew neutrality patrols along the coast, and the Air Station roster grew to 37 aircraft. Anti-submarine patrols flew regularly. In October 1944, Air Station Salem was designated as the first Air-Sea Rescue station on the eastern seaboard. The Martin PBM Mariner, a hold-over from the war, became the primary rescue aircraft. In the mid-1950s, helicopters came, as did Grumman HU-16 Albatross amphibious flying boats (UFs).

The air station's missions included search and rescue, law enforcement, counting migratory waterfowl for the U.S. Biological Survey, and assisting icebound islands by delivering provisions.

The station's surviving facilities are part of Salem's Winter Island Marine Park. Salem Harbor was deep enough to host a seadrome with three sea lanes, offering a variety of take-off headings irrespective of wind direction unless there was a strong steady wind from the east. This produced enormous waves that swept into the mouth of the harbor and hampered water operations. When the seadrome was too rough, returning amphibian aircraft used the Naval Auxiliary Air Facility Beverly. Salem Air Station moved to Cape Cod in 1970.

In 2011, the City of Salem completed plans for the 30-acre (12 ha) Winter Island Park and squared off against residents who are against bringing two power-generating windmills to the tip of Winter Island. The Renewable Energy Task Force, along with the Energy and Sustainability Manager, Paul Marquis, have recommended the construction of a 1.5-megawatt power turbine at the tip of Winter Island, which is the furthest point from residences and where the winds are the strongest.

The 30-acre park has been open to the public since the early 1970s. In 2011, a master plan was developed with help from the planning and design firm, Cecil Group of Boston and Bioengineering Group of Salem. The City of Salem paid $45,000 in federal money. In the long term, the projected cost to rehabilitate just the barracks was $1.5 million. But in the short term, there are multiple lower-cost items, like a proposed $15,000 kayak dock or $50,000 to relocate and improve the bathhouse. This is a very important project since Fort Pickering guarded Salem Harbor as far back as the 17th century.

=== National Guard birthplace and architecture ===
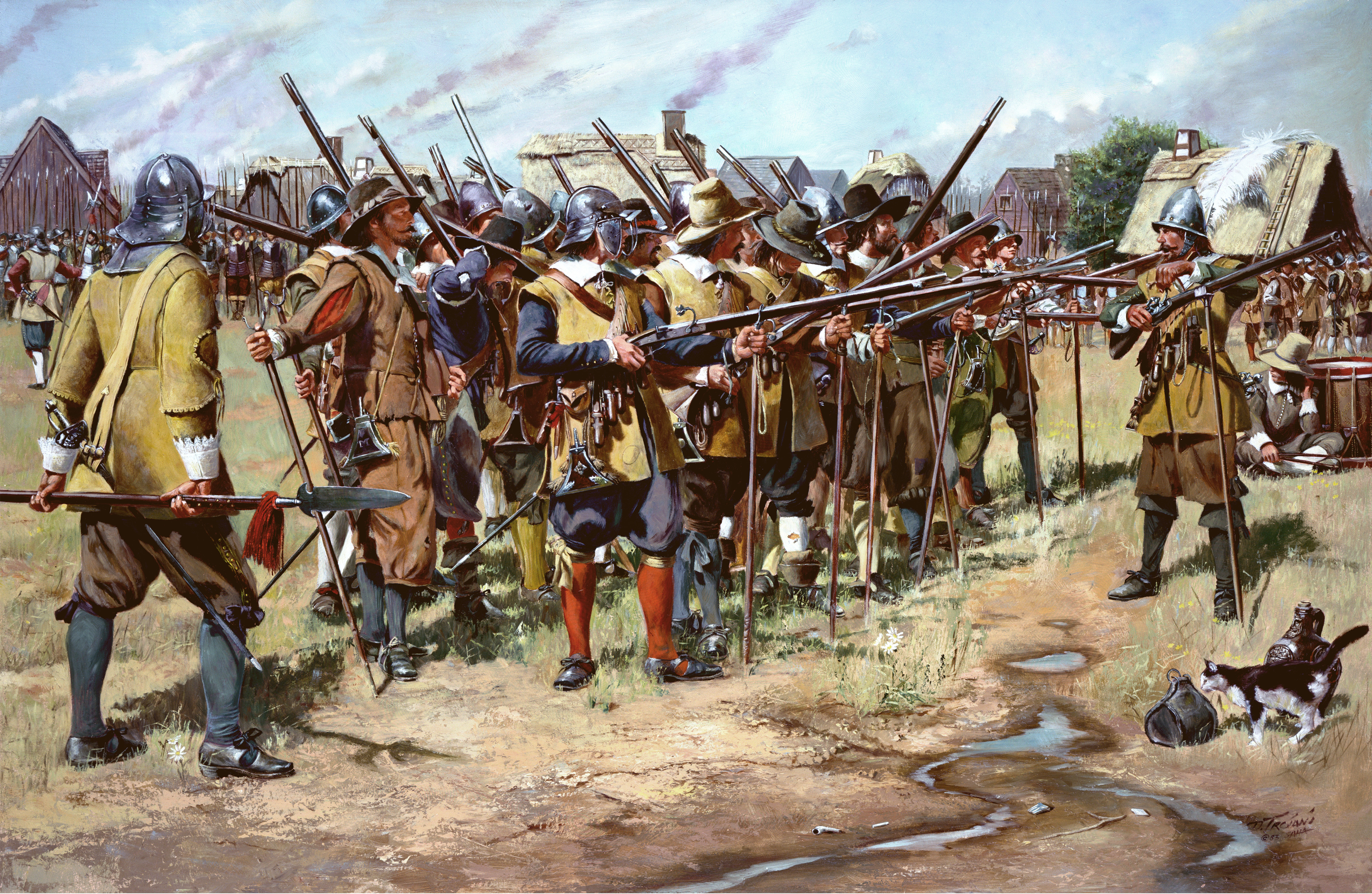
First Muster, Spring 1637, Massachusetts Bay Colony.

In 1637, the first muster was held on Salem Common, where for the first time a regiment of militia drilled for the common defense of a multi-community area, thus laying the foundation for what became the Army National Guard. In 1637, the General Court of the Massachusetts Bay Colony ordered the organization of the Colony's militia companies into the North, South and East Regiments. The colonists adopted the English militia system, which obligated men between the ages of 16 and 60 to own arms and take part in the community's defense.

Each April, the Second Corps of Cadets gather in front of St. Peter's Episcopal Church, where the body of their founder, Stephen Abbott, is buried. They lay a wreath, play "Taps" and fire a 21-gun salute. In another annual commemoration, soldiers gather at Old Salem Armory to honor soldiers who were killed in the Battles of Lexington and Concord. On April 14, 2012, Salem celebrated the 375th anniversary of the first muster on Salem Common, with more than 1,000 troops taking part in ceremonies and a parade.

Samuel McIntire was one of the first architects in the United States, and his work is a prime example of early Federal-style architecture. The Samuel McIntire Historic District is one of the largest concentrations of 17th and 18th century domestic structures in America. It includes McIntire commissions such as the Peirce-Nichols House and Hamilton Hall. The Witch House or Jonathan Corwin House (c. 1642) is also located in the district. Samuel McIntire's house and workshop were located at 31 Summer Street in what is now the Samuel McIntire Historic District.

== Geography ==
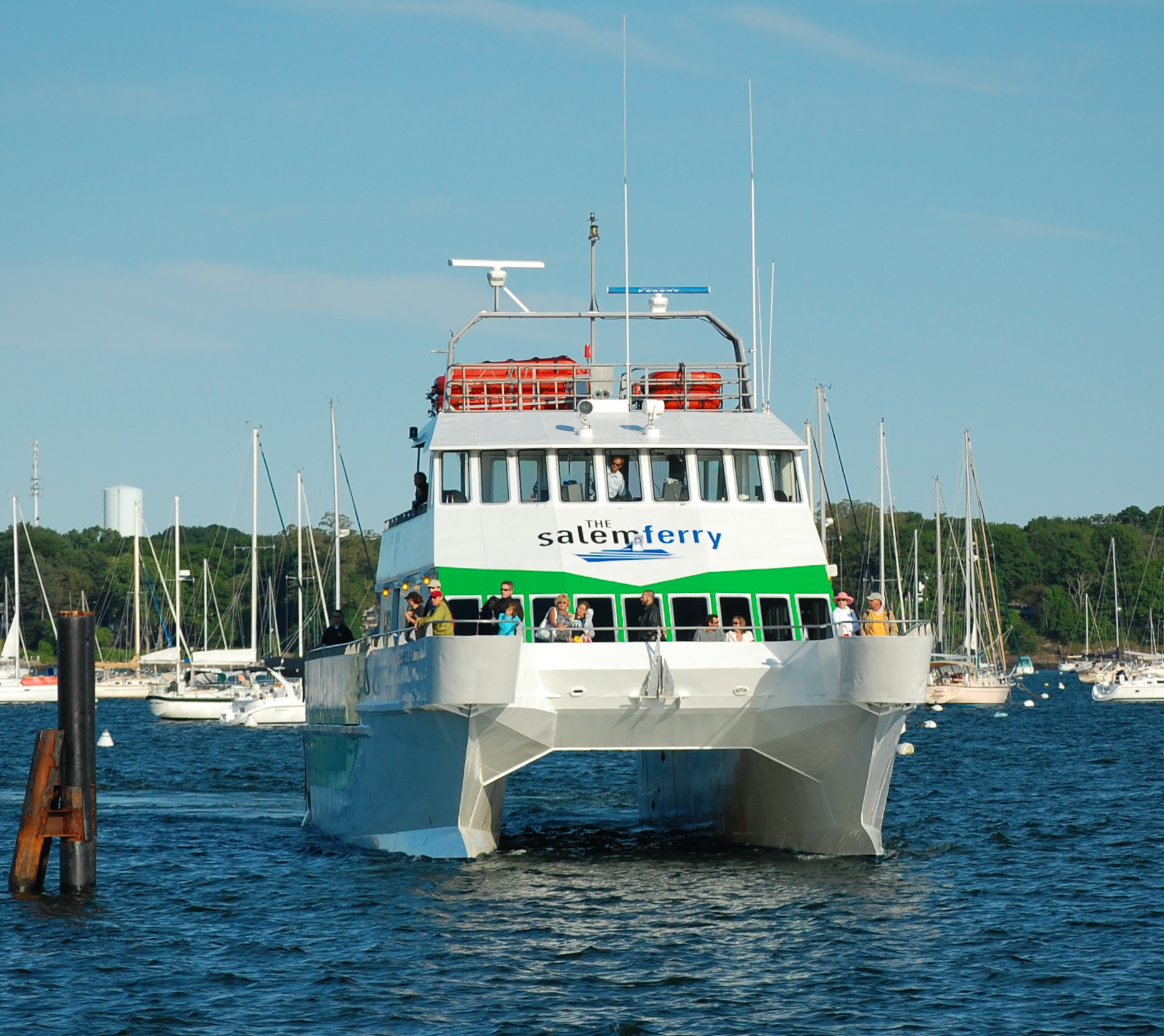
Salem Ferry approaching its dock

According to the United States Census Bureau, the city has a total area of 18.1 square miles (47 km^{2}), of which 8.1 square miles (21 km^{2}) is land and 9.9 square miles (26 km^{2}), or 55.09%, is water. Salem lies on Massachusetts Bay between Salem Harbor, which divides the city from much of neighboring Marblehead to the southeast, and Beverly Harbor, which divides the city from Beverly along with the Danvers River, which feeds into the harbor. Between the two harbors lies Salem Neck and Winter Island, which are divided from each other by Cat Cove, Smith Pool (located between the two land causeways to Winter Island), and Juniper Cove. The city is further divided by Collins Cove and the inlet to the North River. The Forest River flows through the southern end of town, along with Strong Water Brook, which feeds Spring Pond at the town's southwestern corner. The town has several parks, as well as conservation land along the Forest River and Camp Lion, which lies east of Spring Pond.

The city is divided by its natural features into several small neighborhoods. The Salem Neck neighborhood lies northeast of downtown, and North Salem lies to the west of it, on the other side of the North River. South Salem is south of the South River, lying mostly along the banks of Salem Harbor southward. Downtown Salem lies 15 miles (24 km) northeast of Boston, 16 miles (26 km) southwest of Gloucester and Cape Ann, and 19 miles (31 km) southeast of Lawrence, the other county seat of Essex County. Salem is bordered by Beverly to the north, Danvers to the northwest, Peabody to the west, Lynn to the south, Swampscott to the southeast, and Marblehead to the southeast. The town's water rights extend along a channel into Massachusetts Bay between the water rights of Marblehead and Beverly.

=== Climate ===
According to the Köppen climate classification, Salem has either a humid subtropical climate (abbreviated Cfa), or a hot-summer humid continental climate (abbreviated Dfa), depending on the isotherm used.

Climate data for Salem, 1991–2020 interpolated normals (20 ft elevation)
Month	Jan	Feb	Mar	Apr	May	Jun	Jul	Aug	Sep	Oct	Nov	Dec	Year
Mean daily maximum °F (°C)	36.7 (2.6)	38.8 (3.8)	45.0 (7.2)	54.7 (12.6)	64.2 (17.9)	73.6 (23.1)	79.3 (26.3)	78.4 (25.8)	72.3 (22.4)	61.7 (16.5)	51.6 (10.9)	42.1 (5.6)	58.2 (14.6)
Daily mean °F (°C)	28.6 (−1.9)	30.4 (−0.9)	36.9 (2.7)	46.6 (8.1)	56.1 (13.4)	65.7 (18.7)	71.6 (22.0)	70.5 (21.4)	63.9 (17.7)	53.2 (11.8)	43.5 (6.4)	34.3 (1.3)	50.1 (10.1)
Mean daily minimum °F (°C)	20.5 (−6.4)	22.1 (−5.5)	28.8 (−1.8)	38.3 (3.5)	48.0 (8.9)	57.7 (14.3)	63.7 (17.6)	62.4 (16.9)	55.4 (13.0)	44.6 (7.0)	35.4 (1.9)	26.8 (−2.9)	42.0 (5.5)
Average precipitation inches (mm)	3.62 (91.95)	3.43 (87.24)	4.60 (116.88)	4.12 (104.68)	3.47 (88.10)	4.01 (101.76)	3.52 (89.36)	3.32 (84.31)	3.57 (90.57)	4.75 (120.57)	3.98 (101.16)	4.66 (118.46)	47.05 (1,195.04)
Average dew point °F (°C)	18.5 (−7.5)	18.9 (−7.3)	24.4 (−4.2)	33.6 (0.9)	45.3 (7.4)	55.9 (13.3)	61.9 (16.6)	61.5 (16.4)	55.4 (13.0)	44.2 (6.8)	33.4 (0.8)	24.8 (−4.0)	39.8 (4.4)
Source: PRISM Climate Group

== Demographics ==
Historical population
Year	Pop.	±%
1635	900	—
1765	4,427	+391.9%
1776	5,337	+20.6%
1790	7,921	+48.4%
1800	9,457	+19.4%
1810	12,613	+33.4%
1820	12,731	+0.9%
1830	13,895	+9.1%
1840	15,082	+8.5%
1850	20,264	+34.4%
1860	22,252	+9.8%
1870	24,117	+8.4%
1880	27,563	+14.3%
1890	30,801	+11.7%
1900	35,956	+16.7%
1910	43,697	+21.5%
1920	42,529	−2.7%
1930	43,353	+1.9%
1940	41,213	−4.9%
1950	41,880	+1.6%
1960	39,211	−6.4%
1970	40,556	+3.4%
1980	38,220	−5.8%
1990	38,091	−0.3%
2000	40,407	+6.1%
2010	41,340	+2.3%
2020	44,480	+7.6%
2024	45,677	+2.7%
Source: United States census records and Population Estimates Program data. Source: U.S. Decennial Census

=== Racial and ethnic composition ===
Salem city, Massachusetts – Racial composition Note: the US Census treats Hispanic/Latino as an ethnic category. This table excludes Latinos from the racial categories and assigns them to a separate category. Hispanics/Latinos may be of any race.
Race (NH = Non-Hispanic)	% 2020	% 2010	% 2000	Pop 2020	Pop 2010	Pop 2000
White alone (NH)	68.5%	75.9%	82.4%	30,477	31,377	33,277
Black alone (NH)	4.1%	3.5%	2.4%	1,828	1,450	966
American Indian alone (NH)	0.1%	0.2%	0.1%	57	66	59
Asian alone (NH)	2.8%	2.6%	2%	1,255	1,083	797
Pacific Islander alone (NH)	0%	0%	0%	11	17	17
Other race alone (NH)	0.7%	0.4%	0.3%	330	166	132
Multiracial (NH)	3.9%	1.7%	1.5%	1,737	716	618
Hispanic/Latino (any race)	19.8%	15.6%	11.2%	8,785	6,465	4,541

=== 2020 census ===
As of the 2020 census, Salem had a population of 44,480. The median age was 38.6 years. 16.1% of residents were under the age of 18 and 16.9% of residents were 65 years of age or older. For every 100 females there were 85.4 males, and for every 100 females age 18 and over there were 82.4 males age 18 and over.

100.0% of residents lived in urban areas, while 0.0% lived in rural areas.

There were 19,313 households in Salem, of which 22.4% had children under the age of 18 living in them. Of all households, 35.5% were married-couple households, 20.4% were households with a male householder and no spouse or partner present, and 35.7% were households with a female householder and no spouse or partner present. About 35.3% of all households were made up of individuals and 13.1% had someone living alone who was 65 years of age or older.

There were 20,349 housing units, of which 5.1% were vacant. The homeowner vacancy rate was 1.1% and the rental vacancy rate was 3.8%.

Racial composition as of the 2020 census
Race	Number	Percent
White	31,787	71.5%
Black or African American	2,251	5.1%
American Indian and Alaska Native	137	0.3%
Asian	1,290	2.9%
Native Hawaiian and Other Pacific Islander	27	0.1%
Some other race	4,301	9.7%
Two or more races	4,687	10.5%
Hispanic or Latino (of any race)	8,785	19.8%

The most reported ancestries in 2020 were Irish (23.7%), English (14.3%), Italian (12%), Dominican (11.8%), French (7.2%), and German (7%).

Throughout the colonial period and thereafter, Salem was one of the largest municipalities in the United States; as late as the 1820 census, Salem was ranked in the top ten cities in the country by population, and would not drop out of the top 100 until the 20th century.

=== 2010 census ===
As of the census of 2010, there were 41,340 people, 19,130 households, and 9,708 families residing in the city. The population density was 4,986.0 inhabitants per square mile (1,925.1/km^{2}). There were 18,175 housing units at an average density of 2,242.7 per square mile (865.9/km^{2}). The racial makeup of the city was 81.5% White, 4.9% African American, 0.2% Native American, 2.6% Asian, 0.1% Pacific Islander, 6.7% from other races, and 2.5% from two or more races. Hispanic or Latino of any race were 15.6% of the population (9.1% Dominican, 2.9% Puerto Rican, 0.5% Mexican, 0.3% Guatemalan). Non-Hispanic Whites were 75.9% of the population in 2010, compared to 95.9% in 1980.

=== 2000 census ===
There were 17,492 households, out of which 24.2% had children under the age of 18 living with them, 38.8% were married couples living together, 13.3% had a female householder with no husband present, and 44.5% were non-families. Of all households 34.9% were made up of individuals, and 11.5% had someone living alone who was 65 years of age or older. The average household size was 2.24 and the average family size was 2.95.

In the city, the population was spread out, with 20.2% under the age of 18, 10.4% from 18 to 24, 33.4% from 25 to 44, 21.9% from 45 to 64, and 14.1% who were 65 years of age or older. The median age was 36 years. For every 100 females, there were 86.5 males. For every 100 females age 18 and over, there were 83.5 males.

The median income for a household in the city was $44,033, and the median income for a family was $55,635. Males had a median income of $38,563 versus $31,374 for females. The per capita income for the city was $23,857. About 6.3% of families and 9.7% of the population were below the poverty line, including 12.2% of those under age 18 and 7.9% of those age 65 or over.

== Arts and culture ==
=== Historic homes ===
The Pickman House, built c. 1664, abuts the Witch Memorial and Burying Point Cemetery, the second oldest burying ground in the United States.

The Gedney House is a historic house museum built c. 1665 and is the 2nd oldest house in Salem.

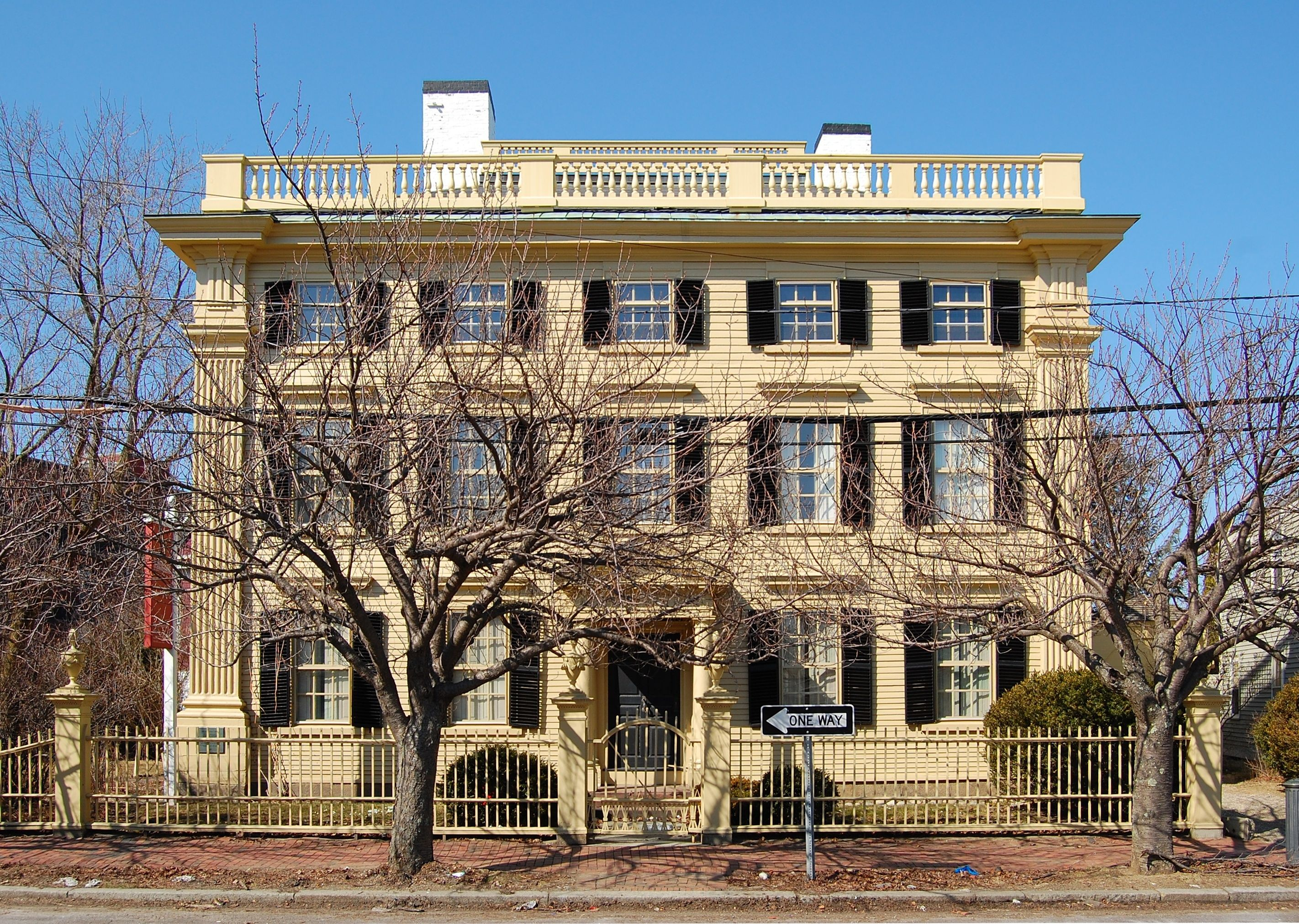
The Peirce-Nichols House, designed by Samuel McIntire, was owned by prominent ship owner Jerathmeil Peirce and is maintained as a museum by the Peabody Essex Museum.

One of the most popular houses in Salem is The Witch House, the only structure in Salem with direct ties to the Salem witch trials of 1692. The Witch House is owned and operated by the City of Salem as a historic house museum.

Hamilton Hall is located on Chestnut Street, where many grand mansions can be traced to the roots of the Old China Trade. Hamilton Hall was built in 1805 by Samuel McIntire and is considered one of his best pieces. It was declared a National Historic Landmark by the National Park Service in 1970.

=== Witch-related tourism ===
In recent years, tourism has been an occasional source of debate in the city, with some residents arguing the city should downplay witch tourism and market itself as a more upscale cultural center. In 2005, the conflict came to a head over plans by the cable television network TV Land to erect a bronze statue of Elizabeth Montgomery, who played the comic witch "Samantha" in the 1960s series Bewitched. Eight episodes of the seventh season of the series were filmed in Salem while their usual set was being repaired after fire damage, and TV Land said that the statue commemorated the 35th anniversary of those episodes. The statue was sculpted by StudioEIS under the direction of brothers Elliott and Ivan Schwartz. Many felt the statue was good fun and appropriate to a city that promotes itself as "The Witch City", and contains a street named "Witch Way". Others objected to the use of public property for what was commercial promotion.

There is also a memorial to the victims of the infamous Witch Trials at Proctor's Ledge, the execution site from that time. The memorial is "meant to be a place of reflection" for the city.

=== Other tourist attractions ===
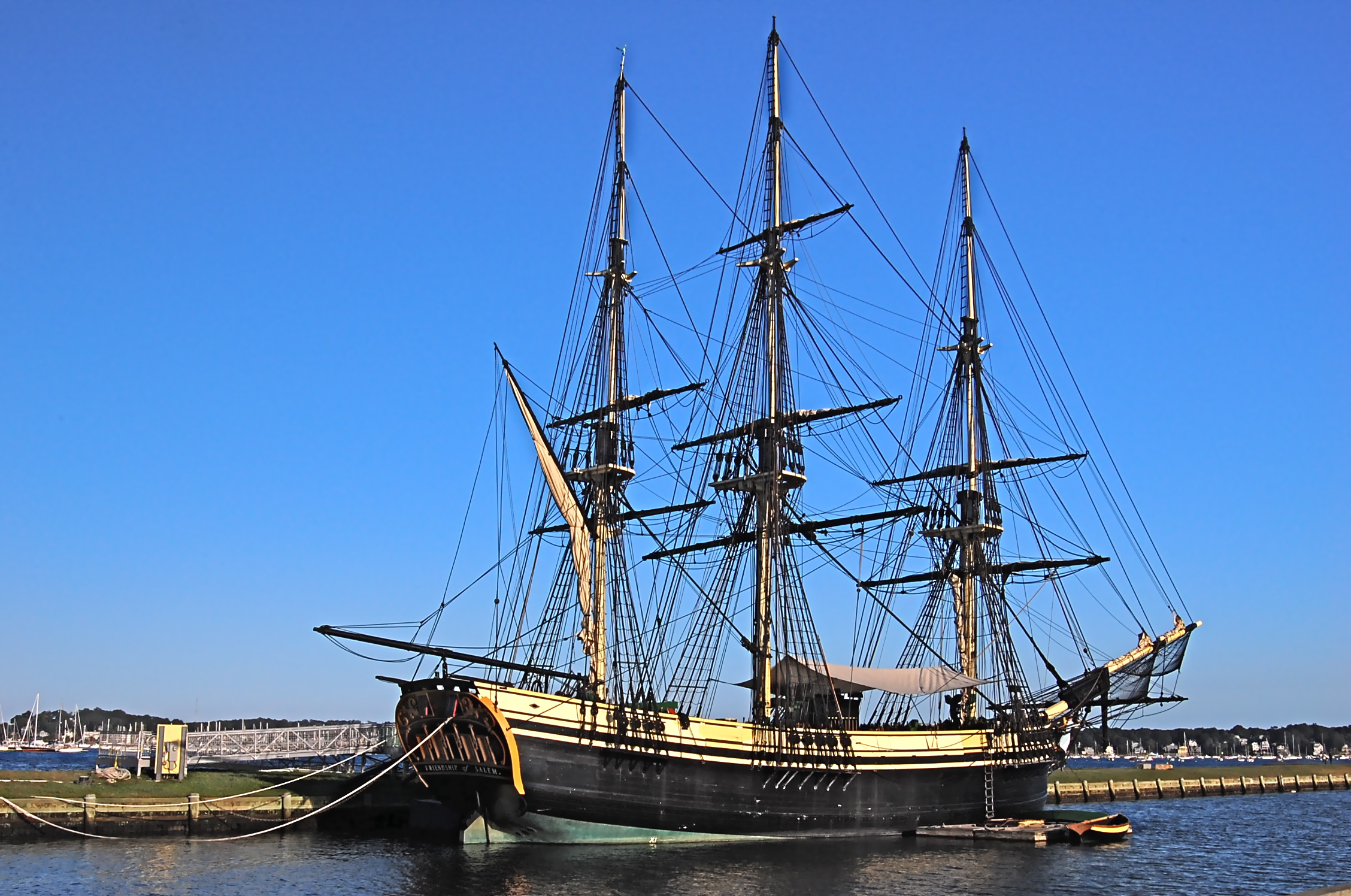
Friendship of Salem replica in Salem

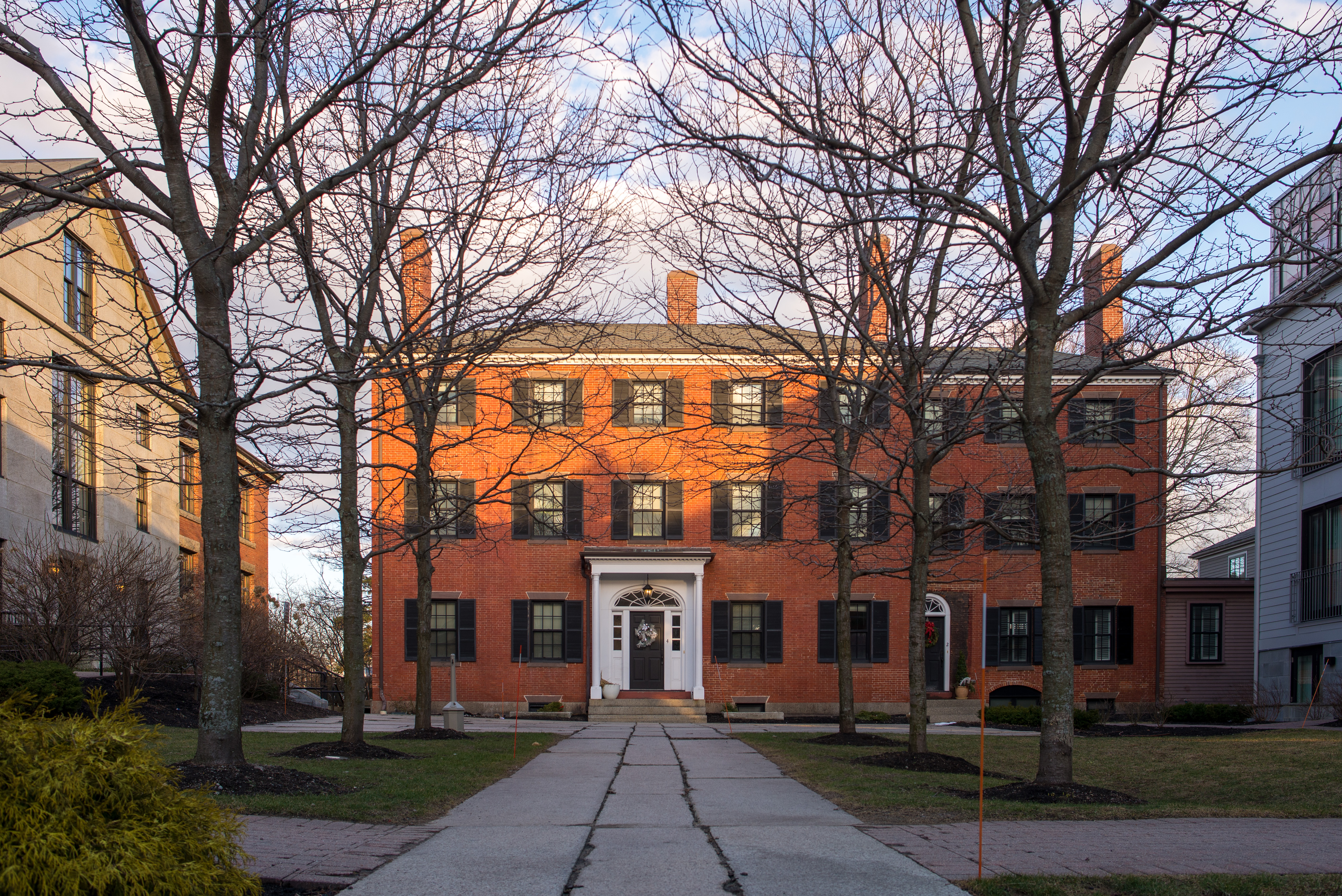
Old Salem Jail after renovations

In 2000, the replica tall ship Friendship of Salem was finished and sailed to Salem Harbor, where she sits today. The Friendship of Salem is a reconstruction of a 171-foot (52 m) three-masted East Indiaman trading ship, originally built in 1797, which traveled the world over a dozen times and returned to Salem after each voyage with goods from all over the world. The original was taken by the British during the War of 1812, then stripped and sold in pieces.

In 2006, with the assistance of a 1.6 million dollar grant and additional funds provided by the City of Salem, Mayor Driscoll launched The Nathaniel Bowditch, a 92-foot catamaran with a top speed of 30 knots which makes the trip between Salem and Boston in just under an hour.

Waterfront redevelopment – The first step in the redevelopment was in 2006, when the State of Massachusetts gave Salem $1,000,000. Bowditch, who was born in Salem and had a home on North Street, is considered the founder of modern maritime navigation. His book, Bowditch's American Practical Navigator, first published in 1802, is still carried on board every commissioned U.S. naval vessel.

The original Fame was a fast Chebacco fishing schooner that was reborn as a privateer when war broke out in the summer of 1812. She was arguably the first American privateer to bring home a prize, and she made 20 more captures before being wrecked in the Bay of Fundy in 1814.

The new Fame is a full-scale replica of this famous schooner. Framed and planked of white oak and trunnel-fastened in the traditional manner, the replica of Fame was launched in 2003. She is now based at Salem's Pickering Wharf Marina, where she takes the paying public for cruises on Salem Sound.

Salem Harborwalk opened in July 2010 to celebrate the rebirth of the Salem waterfront as a source of recreation for visitors as well as the local community. The 1,100-foot (340 m) walkway extends from the area of the Salem Fire Station to the Salem Waterfront Hotel.

The Peabody Essex Museum is a leading museum of Asian art and culture and early American maritime trade and whaling; its collections of Indian, Japanese, Korean, and Chinese art, and in particular Chinese export porcelain, are among the finest in the country. Founded in 1799, it is one of the oldest continuously operating museums in the United States. The museum owns and exhibits a number of historic houses in downtown Salem. In 2003, it completed a massive $100 million renovation and expansion, designed by architect Moshe Safdie, and moved a 200-year-old 16-room Chinese home from Xiuning County in southeastern China to the grounds of the museum.

In 2011, the Peabody Essex Museum announced it had raised $550 million with plans to raise an additional $100 million by 2016. The Boston Globe reported this was the largest capital campaign in the museum's history vaulting the Peabody Essex into the top tier of major art museums. The Peabody Essex Museum trustees co-chairs Sam Byrne and Sean Healey with board president Robert Shapiro led the campaign.$200 to $250 million will fund the museum's 175,000-square-foot expansion bringing the total square footage to 425,000 square feet.

The Misery Islands is a nature reserve located in Salem Sound that was established in 1935. It is managed by the Trustees of Reservations. The islands' name come from shipbuilder Robert Moulton who was stranded on the islands during a winter storm in the 1620s. The islands, in the past, have been home to a club with a golf course and about two dozen cottages. The islands are now uninhabited.

The Pioneer Village, created in 1930, was America's first living-history museum. The site features a three-acre re-creation of a Puritan village and allows visitors the opportunity to participate in activities from the lives of Salem's earliest English settlers.

The Old Salem Jail, an active correctional facility until 1991, once housed captured British soldiers from the War of 1812. It contains the main jail building (built in 1813, renovated in 1884), the jail keeper's house (1813) and a barn (also about 1813). The jail was shuttered in 1991 when Essex County opened its new facility in Middleton. In 2010, a $12 million renovation was completed. One feature of the reconstruction is the jail keeper's house, a three-story brick, Federal-period building originally built in 1813. The project went into a long phase of stagnation when in 1999 the county government was dissolved, resulting in the sale of Salem Jail by the Commonwealth of Massachusetts to the City of Salem for $1. The Old Salem Jail complex was renamed 50 Saint Peter Street and is now private property, with private residences.

Salem Willows is an oceanfront neighborhood and amusement park. It is named for the European white willow trees planted there in 1801 to form a shaded walk for patients convalescing at a nearby smallpox hospital. The area became a public park in 1858, and in the twentieth century became a summer destination for residents of Boston's North Shore, many of whom escaped the heat of the city on newly popular streetcars. The beaches are also a common place to watch the 4th of July fireworks since you can see three sets of fireworks; Salem, Beverly, and Marblehead. The Willows also has a famous popcorn stand, Hobbs, which is known around the North Shore as one of the best places to get popcorn and ice cream.

In 1855, located on 210 Essex Street, was founded the Salem Five Cents Bank, one of the oldest still functioning American banks.

=== Salem Film Fest ===
The Salem Film Fest is a documentary film festival held annually since 2007. It is run by volunteers, with films screened at a number of cinemas around Salem.

=== Literary Arts ===
Since 2011, Salem has been home to The Massachusetts Poetry Festival, the largest poetry Festival in New England, and the Salem Lit Fest has been held annually since 2008. In 2025, the Governor visited Salem to appoint the state's inaugural Poet Laureate, Regie Gibson. In 2024, Salem appointed its own inaugural poet laureate, J.D. Scrimgeour, to a two-year term beginning in 2025.

=== Points of interest ===
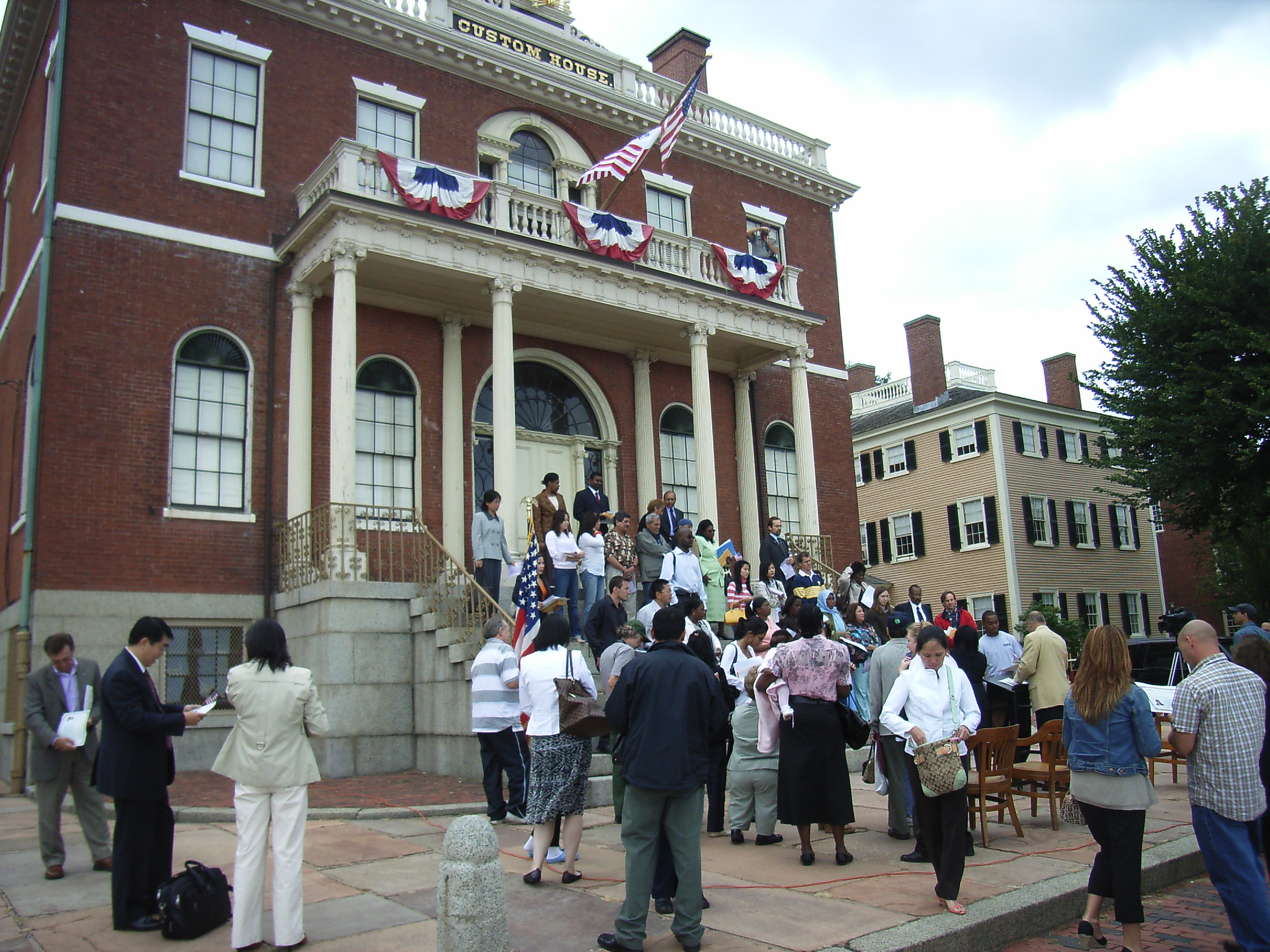
Naturalization ceremony on the stairs of the Custom House, Salem Maritime National Historic Site

- Broad Street Cemetery (c. 1655)
- Crowninshield-Bentley House (c. 1727–1730)
- Gedney House (c. 1665), one of the oldest homes in Salem; located on High Street and Summer Street
- House of the Seven Gables (1668)
- John Tucker Daland House (1851)
- Joseph Story House (1811)
- White-Lord House (1811) 31 Washington Square
- Gardner-Pingree House (1804) Built by Samuel McIntire. Owned by Captain Joseph White who was murdered in the home in 1830 by his nephew Stephen White.
- Chestnut Street District, also known as the McIntire Historic District, greatest concentration of 17th and 18th century domestic structures in the U.S.
- First Church in Salem, Unitarian Universalist, founded in 1629.
- John Hodges House (1788) Built for the founder of the Salem East India Marine Society who founded what is now the Peabody Essex Museum.
- Derby House (1762) First brick house built in Salem after another man had died of a cold who lived in a brick home. Home of America's first millionaire ranked the 10th richest in history.
- Misery Islands
- Nathaniel Bowditch House (c. 1805), home of the founder of modern navigation
- Nathaniel Hawthorne Birthplace (c. 1730–1745)
- Peabody Essex Museum (1799), oldest continually operated museum in America
- Peirce-Nichols House, home of Jerathmiel Peirce, owner of the Friendship of Salem. Designed by noted architect Samuel McIntire.
- Phillips Library
- Pickering House (c. 1651), Broad Street
- Pioneer Village (c. 1930), Forest River Park
- Ropes Mansion (late 1720s)
- Salem Athenaeum
- Salem Common
- Salem Maritime National Historic Site, the only remaining intact waterfront from the U.S. age of sail
- Salem Willows Park (1858), a small oceanfront amusement park
- Stephen Phillips House (1800 & 1821)
- Winter Island, park and historic point of the U.S. Coast Guard in World War II for U-boat patrol
- The Witch House, the home of the Salem witch trials investigator Jonathan Corwin, and the only building still standing in Salem with direct ties to the witch trials
- Count Orlok's Nightmare Gallery, a horror film museum

== Government ==
Salem is represented federally by Democrat Seth Moulton in Massachusetts's 6th congressional district and Democratic Massachusetts senators Ed Markey and Elizabeth Warren.

Salem is represented in the state legislature by officials elected from the following districts:

- Massachusetts Senate's 2nd Essex district
- Massachusetts House of Representatives' 7th Essex district

Salem is represented at the state executive level in Massachusetts's 5th governor's council district and the Southern District of the Massachusetts Registry of Deeds.

Salem operates under a city government system, with an independently elected mayor and an 11-member city council consisting of 4 at-large members and 7 members elected from each of Salem's 7 wards.

Salem presidential election results
Year	Democratic	Republican	Third parties	Total Votes	Margin
2024	71.69% 16,536	25.87% 5,967	2.44% 562	23,065	45.82%
2020	75.04% 18,023	22.62% 5,433	2.34% 562	24,018	52.42%
2016	69.23% 14,950	25.27% 5,458	5.50% 1,187	21,595	43.95%
2012	68.93% 13,605	29.00% 5,725	2.07% 408	19,738	39.92%
2008	68.08% 13,080	29.15% 5,601	2.77% 532	19,213	38.93%
2004	67.94% 12,286	30.76% 5,563	1.29% 234	18,083	37.18%
2000	66.29% 11,173	25.99% 4,380	7.72% 1,302	16,855	40.30%
1996	66.78% 10,436	21.95% 3,430	11.27% 1,762	15,628	44.83%
1992	52.49% 9,385	25.00% 4,471	22.51% 4,025	17,881	27.48%
1988	59.55% 10,339	38.60% 6,702	1.85% 322	17,363	20.95%
1984	55.13% 9,377	44.49% 7,567	0.38% 64	17,008	10.64%
1980	45.00% 8,137	35.27% 6,378	19.73% 3,568	18,083	9.73%
1976	62.34% 11,474	32.99% 6,072	4.67% 859	18,405	29.35%
1972	65.91% 12,489	33.53% 6,354	0.56% 106	18,949	32.38%
1968	76.11% 13,732	21.25% 3,834	2.64% 477	18,043	54.86%
1964	85.65% 16,918	14.05% 2,776	0.30% 59	19,753	71.59%
1960	75.22% 15,879	24.57% 5,188	0.21% 44	21,111	50.64%
1956	48.27% 10,030	51.55% 10,710	0.18% 37	20,777	3.27%
1952	54.10% 12,056	45.57% 10,155	0.33% 74	22,285	8.53%
1948	64.14% 13,789	33.93% 7,294	1.93% 414	21,497	30.21%
1944	60.97% 11,975	38.84% 7,628	0.20% 39	19,642	22.13%
1940	60.77% 12,824	38.46% 8,116	0.78% 164	21,104	22.31%

Voter registration and party enrollment as of February 2, 2025 – Salem
Party	Number of voters	Percentage
Democratic	11,204	31.65%
Republican	1,932	5.46%
Unenrolled	21,804	61.59%
Other	463	1.31%
Total	35,403	100%

== Education ==
=== Salem State University ===
Salem State University is the largest of the nine schools comprising the state university system in Massachusetts (the five University of Massachusetts campuses are a separate system), with 7,500 undergraduates and 2,500 graduate students; its five campuses encompass 115 acres (0.47 km^{2}) and include 33 buildings. The Salem State Foundation hosts an annual lecture series, featuring high-profile speakers from around the world. was originally built in the 1950s and in January 2014 a $18,600,000 project was announced with development.

The university was founded in 1854 as the Salem Normal School (for teacher training) based on the educational principles espoused by Horace Mann, considered to be the "Father of American Public Education."

Salem State University enrolls over 10,000 undergraduate and graduate students representing 27 states and 57 foreign countries and is one of the largest state universities in the Commonwealth of Massachusetts. The university also offers Continuing Education courses for credit or non-credit. Situated on five campuses totaling 115 acres (0.47 km^{2}). Currently, the university houses 2,000 students in its five residence facilities. In 2013 the $74 million, 122,000-square-foot library is going to open on the Salem State University campus. The new library will have more than 150 public computers and 1,000 seats of study space, from tables and desks to lounge chairs scattered throughout the building.

On July 28, 2010 Governor of Massachusetts Deval Patrick signed into law a bill that transforms Salem State College into Salem State University.

Salem State University plans to build a $36 to $42 million dorm for 350 to 400 students. Construction starts in the spring of 2014. In April 2014, Salem State University announced a $25,000,000 fund, and at the time of the announcement, there was already $15,000,000 committed from donations and the money will be used for a variety of things from expanding international study programs, more faculty, brand new computers, scholarships and continued support of professional development for the staff.

=== Primary and secondary education ===
Public elementary schools include the Bates, Carlton, Horace Mann, Saltonstall and Witchcraft Heights schools. Collins Middle School is located on Highland Avenue.

Horace Mann and Salem High School are located on Wilson Street. The Nathaniel Bowditch School closed in 2018 and the Horace Mann School relocated to their previous location. Salem Academy Charter School and Bentley Academy Charter School are also public schools. Private schools are also located in the city, including two independent, alternative schools, The Phoenix School and the Greenhouse School.

In late 2007 and early 2008, the city's public school system garnered regional and even national attention after officials announced a $4.7 million budget shortfall that threatened the jobs of teachers and other staff members. The Massachusetts General Court passed legislation, and residents raised enough money, which averted teacher layoffs. Several dozen support workers were still laid off. Police were investigating what happened to the money in a search for criminal violations of the law.

Salem also once had a very strong Roman Catholic school system. Once home to almost a dozen schools, the last school in the city, St. Joseph School, closed in July 2009 after over 100 years of providing Catholic education. St. James High School, St. Chretienne Academy, St. Chretienne Grammar School and St. Mary's School closed in 1971, St. James Grammar School closed in 1972, St. Thomas the Apostle School closed in 1973, St. Anne School closed in 1976, St. John the Baptist School closed in 1977 and St. Joseph High School closed in 1980.

== Media ==
=== Newspapers ===
Salem is served by The Salem News, which prints four days a week. The Salem News also covers other communities in the area. It is owned by CNHI. Multiple defunct newspapers were previously printed in Salem.

=== Film, literature, and television in Salem ===
- The silent movie Java Head was filmed on location in Salem in 1922.
- In 1970, eight episodes of season 7 of Bewitched were filmed in Salem while their usual Hollywood set was being repaired from fire damage.
- Hocus Pocus was filmed in Salem, which is also the setting of both the movie and its sequel, Hocus Pocus 2.
- Sabrina The Teenage Witch filmed an episode in Salem and her black cat familiar was also named Salem.
- In 2008, beginning scenes from the film Bride Wars were filmed at the interior of the Peabody Essex Museum.
- The 2012 Rob Zombie movie The Lords of Salem was set and filmed in Salem.
- Who Do You Think You Are? included an episode tracing the ancestry of actress Sarah Jessica Parker, filming on location in Salem.
- Some interior and street scenes for 2013's American Hustle were filmed on Federal St. in Salem outside the Essex Superior Court House and Old Granite Courthouse.
- Scenes from 2015's Joy were filmed in the Boston area, with scenes shot in Salem shot at the Hawthorne Hotel.
- Chronicle, a New England-centered newsmagazine show, has produced multiple episodes about Salem over the years, which have been filmed on location.
- Scenes from the supernatural horror television series Castle Rock have been filmed in Salem, specifically at Pioneer Village, a living-history museum that focuses on pilgrim-era Salem.
- The comedy film Hubie Halloween starring Adam Sandler was filmed in Salem in 2019.
- Defending Jacob, a crime drama miniseries, features scenes shot by the courthouse on Federal Street.

== Infrastructure ==
=== Transportation ===
==== Roads ====
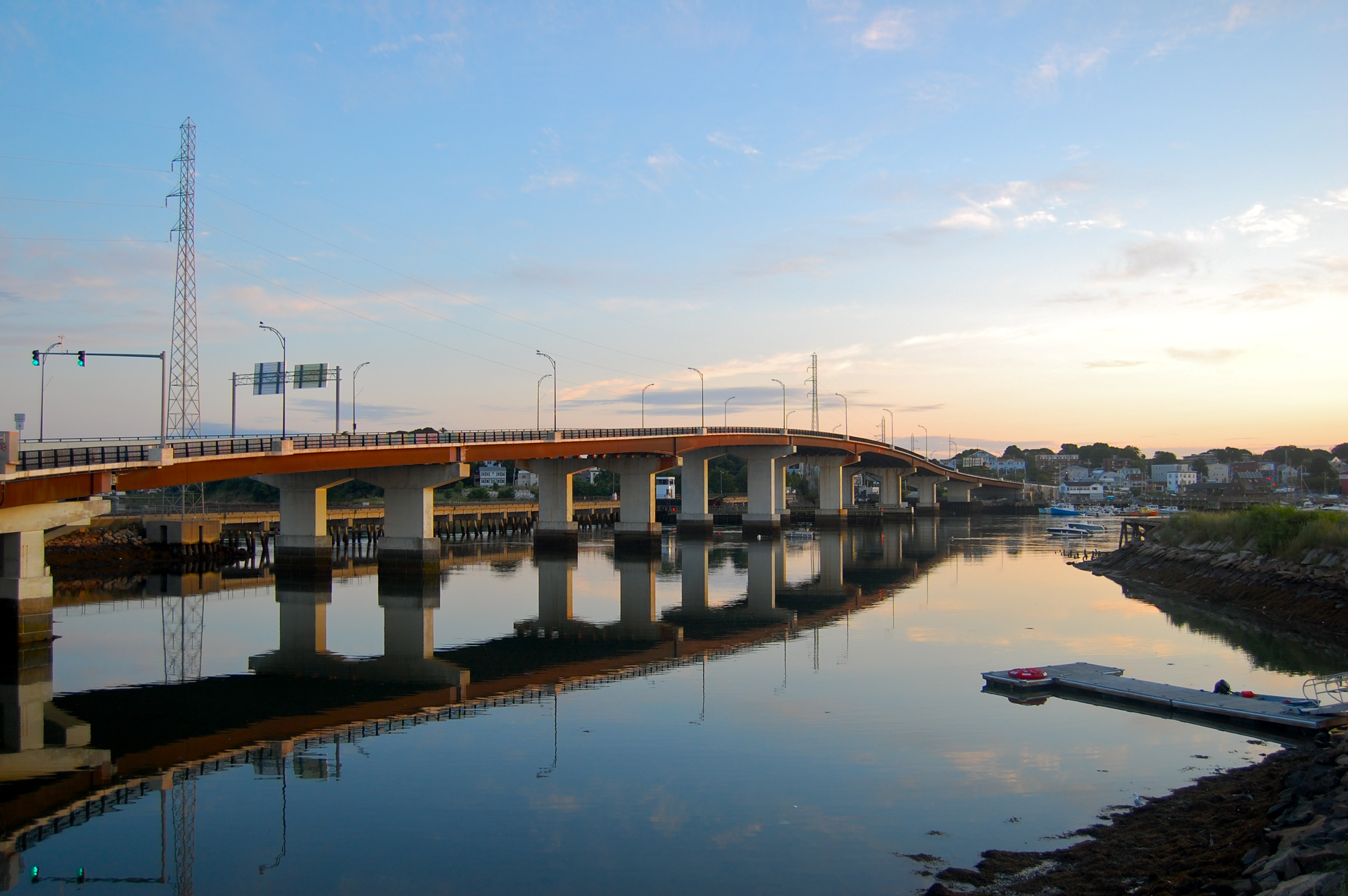
Veterans Memorial Bridge between Salem and Beverly

The connection between Salem and Beverly is made across the Danvers River and Beverly Harbor by three bridges, the Kernwood Bridge to the west, and a railroad bridge and the Essex Bridge, from the land between Collins Cove and the North River, to the east. The Veterans Memorial Bridge carries Massachusetts Route 1A across the river. Route 1A passes through the eastern side of the city, through South Salem towards Swampscott. For much of its length in the city, it is coextensive with Route 114, which goes north from Marblehead before merging with Route 1A, and then heading northwest from downtown towards Lawrence. Route 107 also passes through town, entering from Lynn in the southwest corner of the city before heading towards its intersection with Route 114 and terminating at Route 1A. There is no highway access within the city; the nearest highway access to Route 128 is along Route 114 in neighboring Peabody.

==== Rail ====
Salem has a station on the Newburyport/Rockport Line of the MBTA Commuter Rail. The railroad lines are also connected to a semi-abandoned portion of freight lines which lead into Peabody, and a former line into Marblehead has been converted into a bike path. There are talks of potentially establishing a South Salem station, which would be located on Ocean Avenue West and provide more efficient transportation to South Salem and students at Salem State University.

==== Bus ====
Several MBTA Bus routes pass through the city. Route 435 starts at Salem station and continues along North Street through North Salem to Danvers. Route 450 starts at Salem station and continues through Federal Street and along Highland Avenue in Southwest Salem, continuing to Lynn. Route 451 starts at Salem station and goes through Downtown Salem before continuing along Bridge Street to Beverly. Route 455 starts at Salem station and runs along Lafayette street and Loring avenue through South Salem and by the campus of Salem State University, continuing into Swampscott. Route 456 follows the same route as Route 450 inside the city of Salem, diverting to Lynn station after entering Lynn.

Students of Salem State University are additionally able to request a student-driven shuttle bus that takes them between the various campuses of the university as well as Downtown Salem.

==== Salem Skipper ====
The City of Salem launched a microtransit network called the Salem Skipper in December 2020. The on-demand transit network is operated by Via and allows riders to share the same vehicle for approximately the same price as a MBTA Bus ticket. Passengers can hail a ride on their mobile device with the Salem Skipper app, or by calling a dispatcher.

==== Airports ====
The nearest general aviation airport is Beverly Municipal Airport, and the nearest commercial airline service for national and international flights is at Boston's Logan International Airport.

==== The Salem Ferry ====
The Nathaniel Bowditch is a 92-foot (28 m) high-speed catamaran that travels from Salem to Boston in 50 minutes from May to October and had its maiden voyage on June 22, 2006. The Salem Ferry is named after Nathaniel Bowditch, who was from Salem and wrote the American Practical Navigator. Ridership increased every year from 2006 to 2010, when it peaked with 89,000, but in 2011 service was cut back because of the dramatic rise in fuel prices. The Salem Ferry is docked at the Derby Waterfront District.

The ferry was purchased by the City of Salem with the use of grant money that covered 90 percent of the $2.1 million purchase price.

For the 2012 season Boston Harbor Cruises took over the running of the Salem Ferry with seven-day service and a Monday to Friday 7 a.m. commuter ferry to Boston. The Salem Ferry will be running seven days a week for the 2012 season starting the first weekend in June and going through to Halloween.

Boston Harbor Cruises, the contractor that operates the city's commuter ferry to Boston, runs their largest and fastest vessel between Salem and Hingham for the last two weekends in October. The company's high-speed ferry service to Provincetown concludes in October, freeing up its 600-passenger boat for service between Salem and Hingham. The ferry ride between Hingham and Salem takes one hour. With traffic, especially around Halloween, the drive between Salem and Hingham could be three hours or more.

For the 2013 season, service was expected to start in the last week of May. The Salem City councilors approved a five-year contract with Boston Harbor Cruises to operate the city's commuter ferry from 2013 to 2017. Also new for the 2013 season, Boston Harbor Cruises will offer a 20 percent discount to Salem residents for non-commuter tickets. The City of Salem has approved a seasonal restaurant with a liquor license at The Salem Ferry dock to be operated by Boston Harbor Cruises. The plan is to build a 600-square-foot (56 m^{2}) building plus patio seating.

The latest data from 2015 point to 61,000 riders, with around 11,000 being commuters, according to Boston Harbor Cruises, which runs the Salem Ferry.

==== Electric car charge program ====
Salem has eight electric vehicle charging stations. Four are located at the Museum Place Mall near the Peabody Essex Museum and the other four are in the South Harbor garage across the street from the Salem Waterfront Hotel. The program started in January 2013 and will be free of charge for two years, allowing people to charge their electric cars and other electric vehicles for up to six hours. This program was paid for by a grant from the state of Massachusetts due to Salem's status as a Massachusetts Green Community.

=== Healthcare ===
==== Salem Hospital ====
Salem Hospital, formerly North Shore Medical Center, is located in Salem and is the second largest community hospital system in Massachusetts. It offers comprehensive medical and surgical services and includes emergency/trauma departments, advanced cardiac surgery, and a birthplace. It includes Salem Hospital's main campus as well as outpatient care and urgent care. Salem Hospital's medical staff includes nearly 600 affiliated physicians representing primary care, family practice and 50 additional sub-specialties.

The hospital is a general medical and surgical hospital, which has 395 beds. The hospital had 19,467 admissions in the latest year for which data are available. It performed 4,409 annual inpatient and 7,955 outpatient surgeries. Its emergency department had 90,149 visits in 2012. The helipad at Salem Hospital is a helicopter transportation hub, with multiple daily flights to hospitals all over Boston.

Captain John Bertram (1796–1882) lived in Salem and is the founder of Salem Hospital. In 1873, Captain John Bertram gave a gift of $25,000 in cash, plus a brick mansion on Charter Street to create Salem Hospital. From the original building on Charter Street, Salem Hospital moved to the current location on Highland Avenue in 1917. After John Bertram died in March 1882, his widow donated their home, a mansion built in the High Style Italianate with brick and brownstone for materials at 370 Essex Street, and this became the Salem Public Library. In addition, the John Bertram House is now a home for the elderly.

=== Waterfront redevelopment ===
The first step in the redevelopment was in 2006, when the State of Massachusetts gave Salem $1,000,000. The lion's share of the money—$750,000—was earmarked for acquisition of the Blaney Street landing, the private, 2-acre (8,100 m^{2}) site off Derby Street used by the ferry, and Salem Harbor. Another $200,000 was approved for the design of the new Salem wharf, a large pier planned for the landing, which officials said could be used by small cruise ships, commercial vessels and fishing boats. In June 2012, the $1.75 million was awarded by the state of Massachusetts and will launch a first phase of dredging and construction of a 100-foot (30 m) extension of the pier; a harborwalk to improve pedestrian access; and other lighting, landscaping and paving improvements. Dredging will allow the city to attract other ferries, excursion vessels and cruise ships of up to 250 feet (76 m).

In October 2010, Mayor Driscoll announced that the city would formally acquire the Blaney Street parcel from Dominion Energy, paving the way for the Salem Wharf project. The City of Salem secured $1.25 million from the Massachusetts Seaport Advisory Council and $2.5 million in federal grant dollars to move forward with the construction of the project. The city acquired the parcel with the help of a $1.7 million grant received from the Seaport Advisory Council.

The City of Salem's plans call for a total build-out of the current Blaney Street pier, known as the Salem Wharf project. When finished, the Blaney Street pier will be home to small to medium-sized cruise ships, commercial vessels and the Salem Ferry. This project is fully engineered and permitted.

In 2010, in early phase work to be finished for the 2011 season, a contractor was running underground utility cables and erecting an interim terminal building that will be used by the Salem Ferry, replacing the current trailer. The building will have an indoor bathroom—a first at the ferry landing—along with a waiting room and possibly an outdoor area with awnings. Also new for 2011 is a paved lot with about 140 parking spaces replacing the existing dirt parking lot.

Also in 2011, construction crews were building a long seawall at the Blaney Street landing, which runs from the edge of the ferry dock back toward Derby Street and along an inner harbor. This is one of the early and key pieces of the Salem Pier, which the city hopes to have completed by 2014 and is the key to eventually bring cruise ships to Salem.

At the end of the 2011 season of the Salem Ferry, in the late fall of 2011, after the ferry season ended, contractors were to start building the first section of the T-shaped, 350-foot (110 m) pier. Work on that phase was scheduled to be completed by the fall of 2012. As of April 2011, the City of Salem had secured half of the $20 million and still needed to secure about $10 million in state and federal funds to complete this waterfront pier.

=== Salem Harbor Power Station ===
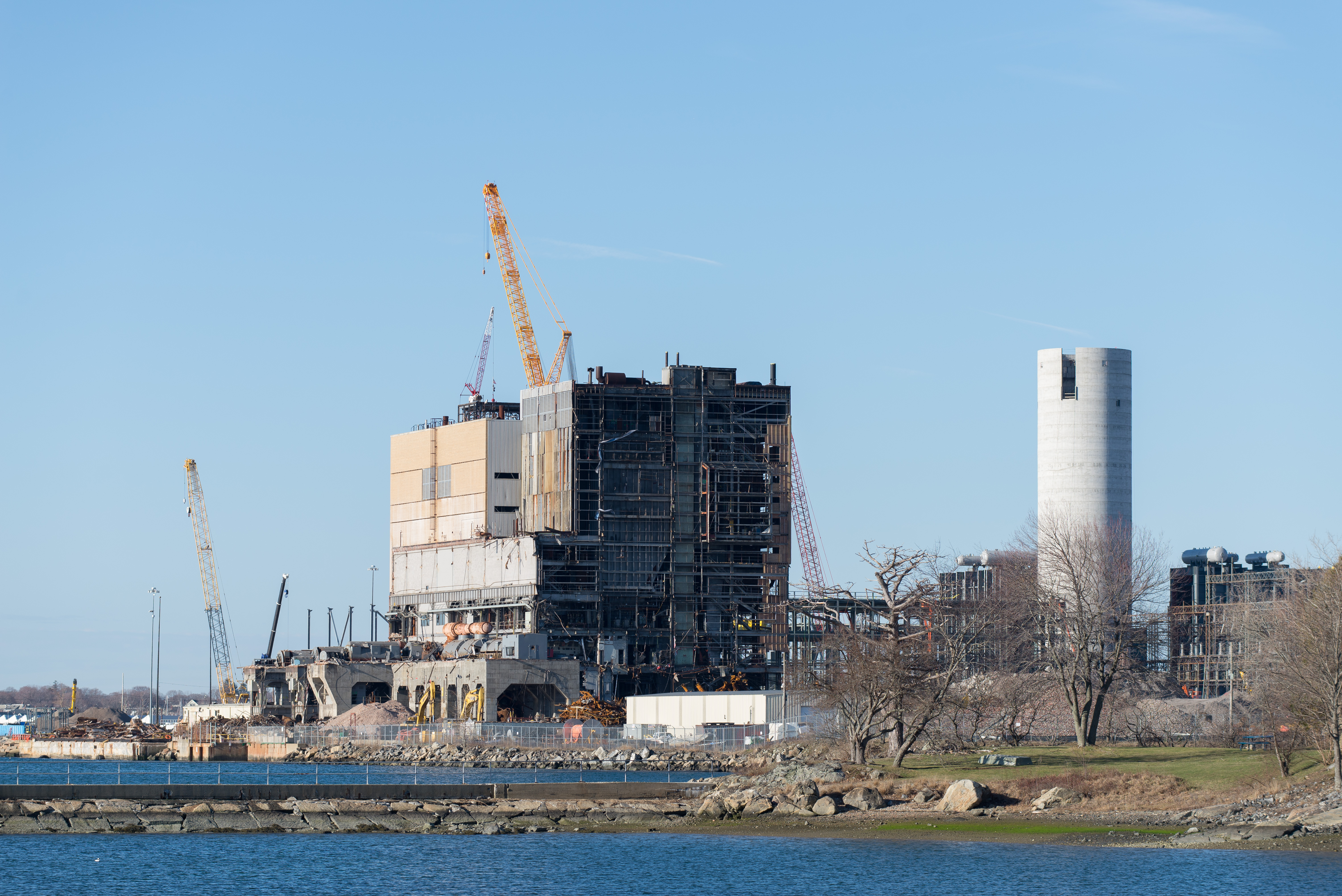
The original coal plant (at left) being demolished in 2016, as the single smokestack of the new plant rises

In May 2011, after years of legal battles, protests, and one recent fatal accident, the owner of the Salem Harbor Power Station announced it will close down the facility permanently. Salem Harbor Station was a 60-year-old power plant that was owned by Dominion of Virginia. With the approval of ISO New England, the 60-year-old coal and oil-fired plant closed for good in June 2014.

The City of Salem was awarded a $200,000 grant from the Clean Energy Center prior to the closure of the plant. This grant money is being used to plan for the eventual re-use of the property. The City of Salem reached out to state and federal officials to ask for their cooperation and assistance in planning for the future and to provide money, in an effort to clean up the 62-acre site.

Footprint Power, a startup New Jersey–based energy company, announced on June 29, 2012, that it had signed an agreement to acquire Salem Harbor Station from Dominion Energy of Virginia. Footprint Power planned to demolish the 63-acre waterfront site that has towering smokestacks, a coal pile, and oil tanks. A city study estimated cleanup costs at more than $50 million. The final plan was to develop a new state-of-the-art natural gas plant on one-third of the original site, reportedly along the Fort Avenue side near the city's ferry landing. The remainder of the waterfront property eventually will be used for commercial and industrial redevelopment, the company said. "The transition will not only stabilize our property tax base, but also provide cleaner, more efficient and reliable energy." Footprint said its plans are consistent with the recommendations of a city study completed earlier that year on the future use of the power plant site. The City of Salem required Footprint to demolish the existing plant and stacks. "We will restore some 30 to 40 acres of our waterfront to its vibrant and prosperous past." Mayor Kim Driscoll said she had not "detailed" talks yet with Footprint, but is encouraged by discussions so far. Beginning in December 2013, there were many appeals under way from various groups who did not want the plant rebuilt. The main opponent that fought in court was the Conservation Law Foundation, a leading environmental advocacy group intent on blocking the plant from being built.

== Economy ==
Tourism plays a significant role in the economy of Salem, Massachusetts, particularly during the Halloween and fall season. The city hosts its annual Haunted Happenings festival, which attracts large numbers of visitors each year. During October, Salem experiences a substantial increase in tourism, with over one million visitors reported in peak periods. This seasonal influx supports local businesses, including restaurants, retail shops, and hotels, and contributes to the city's overall economic activity.

== Notable people ==
- Mary Abbott (1857–1904), writer, reviewer, golfer; mother of the first woman to ever win an Olympic gold medal, Margaret Abbott
- Nehemiah Adams (1806–1878), clergyman and author
- Frank Almy (born George Abbott, 1857–1893), convicted murderer
- Alexander Graham Bell (1847–1922), inventor of the telephone
- Frank Weston Benson (1862–1951), impressionist artist
- John Prentiss Benson (1865–1947), architect and maritime artist
- William Bentley (1759–1819), Unitarian minister, Salem diarist
- Harold W. Blakeley (1893–1966), U.S. Army major general
- Nathaniel Bowditch (1773–1838), mathematician and navigator; Nathaniel Bowditch School is named in his honor
- Edward Scott Bozek (1950–2022), Olympic épée fencer
- Rick Brunson, NBA player and coach
- Sean Stellato, NFL agent and author
- William Mansfield Buffum (1832–1905), member of Arizona Territorial Legislature
- Timothy Burgess, entomologist and zoologist
- Laurie Cabot, Witchcraft high priestess and author
- Robert Ellis Cahill (1934–2005), sheriff, historian and author
- Spencer Charnas (1985–present), musician
- Joseph Hodges Choate (1832–1917), lawyer and diplomat
- Lucy Hiller Lambert Cleveland (1780–1866), writer and folk artist
- Roger Conant (c. 1592–1679), founder of Salem
- Crowninshield family, Boston Brahmins who later helped settle Salem
- Benjamin Crowninshield (1772–1851), Congressman from Massachusetts, Secretary of the Navy
- Frederick M. Davenport (1866–1956), US Congressman
- Elias Hasket Derby (1739–1799), merchant, first millionaire
- Elias Hasket Derby Jr. (1766–1826), General of Second Corp Cadets, inventor of first broadcloth loom in America
- Joseph Dixon (1799–1869), Inventor of the SLR, high temperature crucibles, the Dixon-Ticonderoga Pencil, and anti-counterfeiting methods
- Paul Douglas (1892–1976), US senator and Economist
- Joseph Horace Eaton (1815–1896), artist and military officer
- Ephraim Emerton (1851–1935), medievalist historian and Harvard chair
- John Endecott (1588–1665), governor
- Thomas Gardner (c. 1592–1674), co-founder of Salem
- Robert B. Groat (1888–1959), Printer, publisher, and politician
- John Hathorne (1641–1717), the "Hanging Judge" in Salem witch trials
- William Hathorne (c. 1576–1650), early businessman and political leader
- Nathaniel Hawthorne (1804–1864), iconic author of The Scarlet Letter and The House of the Seven Gables
- Sophia Amelia Peabody Hawthorne (1809–1871), painter, illustrator, writer
- Mary Tileston Hemenway (1820–1894), Sponsor of the Hemenway Southwestern Archaeological Expedition
- Harriet Lawrence Hemenway (1858–1960), Founder of Massachusetts Audubon Society
- Jeff Juden, Major League Baseball pitcher
- Frederick W. Lander (1821–1862), Civil War general, wagon trail and railroad surveyor, poet
- John Larch (1914–2005), actor
- Dudley Leavitt (1720–1762), early Harvard-educated Congregational minister, Leavitt Street named for him
- Mary Lou Lord, singer-songwriter; grew up in Salem
- Samuel McIntire (1757–1811), architect and woodcarver
- Francis W. Moore, Jr. (1808–1864), Mayor of Houston
- Seth Moulton (born 1978), Congressman from Massachusetts
- Rob Oppenheim (born 1980), professional golfer
- Charles Grafton Page (1812–1868), electrical inventor
- George Swinnerton Parker (1866–1952), founder of Parker Brothers
- Samuel Parris (1653–1720), minister
- Elizabeth Palmer Peabody (1804–1894), educator, writer, prominent Transcendentalist, advocate for women and Native Americans
- Benjamin Peirce (1809–1880), mathematician and logician, director of United States Coast Survey from 1867 to 1874
- Annie Stevens Perkins (1868–1946), writer
- Thomas Handasyd Perkins Haitian slave trader up to Slave Revolt, opium dealer, owned Perkins & Co.
- Samuel Phillips (1690–1771), first pastor of the South Church in Andover
- Timothy Pickering (1745–1829), secretary of state to Washington and Adams, aide de camp to Washington
- Benjamin Pickman Jr. (1763–1843), early Salem merchant for whom Pickman Street is named
- Dudley Leavitt Pickman (1779–1846), state legislator
- Ernest R. Redmond (1883–1966), Army officer and Chief of National Guard; educated in Salem and became real estate agent; served on Mexican border in 1916 during Pancho Villa Expedition
- Sarah Parker Remond (1826–1894), abolitionist
- Aaron Richmond (1895–1965), impresario and artist manager
- Brian St. Pierre, quarterback, Boston College and NFL
- Elizabeth Elkins Sanders (1762–1851), American author and social critic
- Zach Sanford (born 1994), professional ice hockey player
- Samuel Sewall (1652–1730), magistrate
- Samuel Skelton (c. 1584–1634), first pastor of First Church in Salem, original Puritan church in North America
- Mason Stajduhar (born 1997), soccer player
- Joseph Story (1779–1845), Associate Superior Court Justice
- Hannah Swarton (1651–1708), colonial pioneer captured by Abenaki Indians and held captive for five years
- Steve Thomas, former host of PBS's This Old House
- Mary Wilder Tileston (1843–1934), author and editor of compilations
- Lydia Louisa Anna Very (1823–1901), American author and illustrator
- Bob Vila, craftsman
- Frederick Townsend Ward (1831–1862), sailor and mercenary
- Thomas A. Watson (1854–1934), assistant to Alexander Graham Bell; his name was the first phrase ever uttered over a telephone
- Daniel Webster (1782–1852), politician and orator
- Jack Welch (1935–2020), former chairman and CEO of General Electric; grew up in Salem and attended Salem High School
- Roger Williams (1603–1683), theologian

== In popular culture ==
- The television series Motherland: Fort Salem is based in this place but in an alternate reality or history.
- In the DC Comics universe, the character Doctor Fate uses Salem as a base of operations.
- Fallout 4 features Salem as a location. Players can find the Museum of Witchcraft at this location.
- The Disney film Hocus Pocus takes place in Salem and features witches as primary antagonists.

== Sister cities ==
- Oroville, California (United States) 2007
- Ōta, Tokyo (Japan) 1991

== See also ==
- USS Salem, 3 ships
- Salem, City in Tamilnadu, India
- Salem, City in New Jersey, US
- Salem, City in Oregon, US
