= Elizabeth Elkins Sanders =

American social critic

- Born: August 12, 1762; Salem
- Died: February 19, 1851; Salem
- Occupations: Essayist, writer
- Children: Mary Elizabeth Sanders Saltonstall, Caroline Saunders Saltonstall

Elizabeth Elkins Sanders (August 12, 1762 – February 19, 1851) was an American writer and social critic. Beginning at age 66, she published a series of anonymous pamphlets decrying the treatment of Native Americans and Pacific Islanders.

== Life and career ==
Elizabeth Elkins was born on August 12, 1762, in Salem, Massachusetts, the second daughter of Thomas and Elizabeth White Elkins. Her father died when she was one year old. In 1782, she married Thomas Sanders, who would become one of Salem's wealthiest merchants. They attended the First Unitarian Church of Salem.

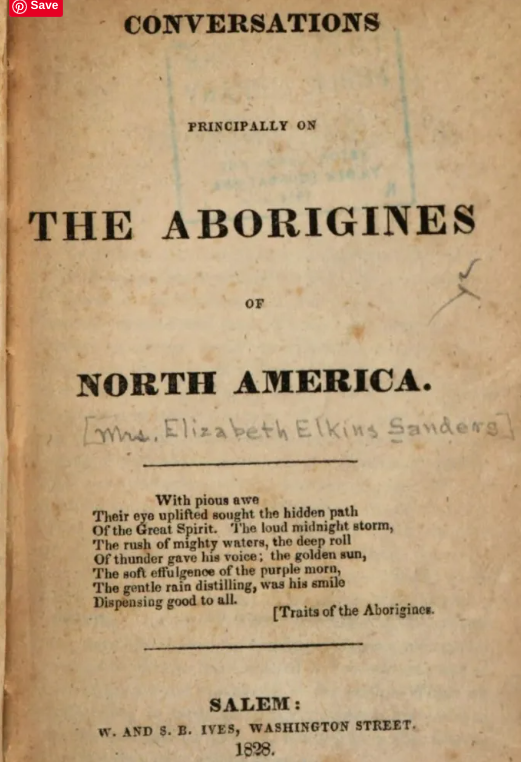
Conversations, Principally on the Aborigines of North America

Her first pamphlet was published at the age of 66. Conversations, Principally on the Aborigines of North America (1828) is structured in the form of a dialogue between a mother and her daughters. Sanders expresses admiration for the culture of Native Americans and surveys Native American groups across North America. She decries the forced removal of Creeks and Cherokees from Georgia and the atrocities committed against Native Americans by the US military. She bluntly labels Andrew Jackson a "sanguinary chieftain" and "a second Robespierre". She followed this up with a second pamphlet on the similar themes, The First Settlers of New England (1829).

At age 82, she began publishing another series of pamphlets on the topic of missionary work: Tract on Missions (1844), Second Part of a Tract on Missions (1845), and Remarks on the "Tour Around Hawaii," by the Missionaries, Messrs. Ellis, Thurston, and Goodrich (1848). She feared that missionary work would destroy the native cultures of Pacific Islanders and had harsh words for "the gloomy doctrines" and "appalling formulas" of Calvinism. She also favorably cites Herman Melville's Typee and may have been an influence on Melville.

Elizabeth Elkins Sanders died on February 19, 1851, in Salem.

== Children ==
Sanders and her husband had two sons and four daughters. Two of her daughters married two sons of Dr. Nathaniel Saltonstall (1746–1815).

- Charles Sanders (b. 1783), the namesake of the Sanders Theatre in Harvard University's Memorial Hall.
- Catherine Sanders Pickman (b. 1784)
- Mary Elizabeth Sanders Saltonstall (1788–1858), who married Leverett Saltonstall I
- Caroline Sanders Saltonstall (1793–1882), who married Nathaniel Saltonstall (1784–1838)
- Lucy Sanders (bapt. 1793)
- George Thomas Sanders (1804–1856)

== Bibliography ==
- Conversations, Principally on the Aborigines of North America (1828)
- The First Settlers of New England (1829)
- Tract on Missions (1844)
- Second Part of a Tract on Missions (1845)
- Remarks on the "Tour Around Hawaii," by the Missionaries, Messrs. Ellis, Thurston, and Goodrich (1848)
