= East India Marine Society =

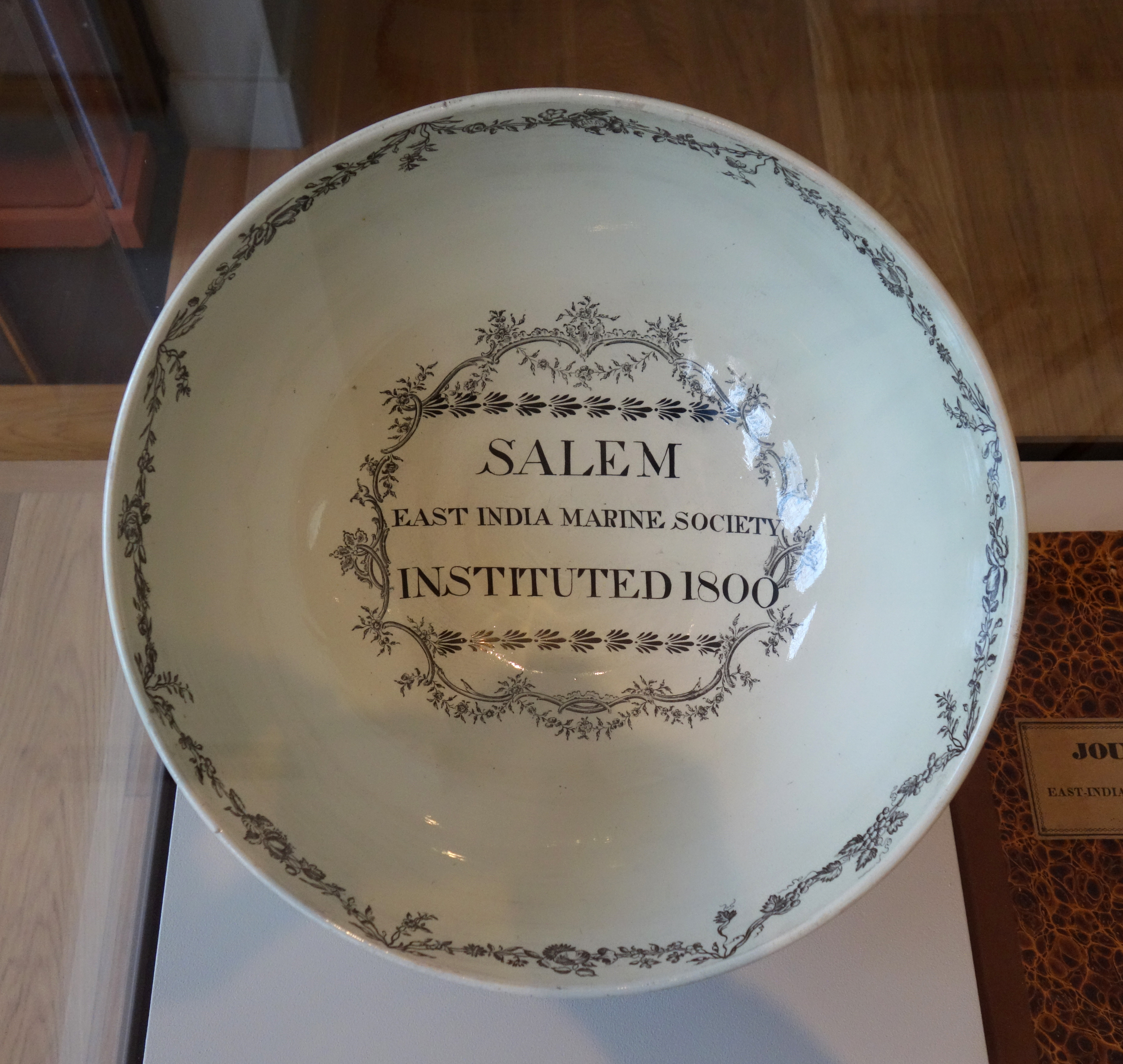
Punch bowl commemorating the founding of the East India Marine Society

The East India Marine Society (est. 1799) of Salem, Massachusetts, United States, was "composed of persons who have actually navigated the seas beyond the Cape of Good Hope or Cape Horn, as masters or supercargoes of vessels belonging to Salem." It functioned as a charitable and educational organization, and maintained a library and museum. It flourished especially in the 1800s–1830s, a heyday of foreign trade. In 1910 the society reincorporated as "Trustees of the Salem East India Marine Society."

In 2025, the East India Marine Society is being commemorated through a significant exhibition at the Peabody Essex Museum (PEM) in Salem, Massachusetts. This year marks the 200th anniversary of the East India Marine Hall, originally dedicated in 1825 as the headquarters of the Society.

== Museum ==
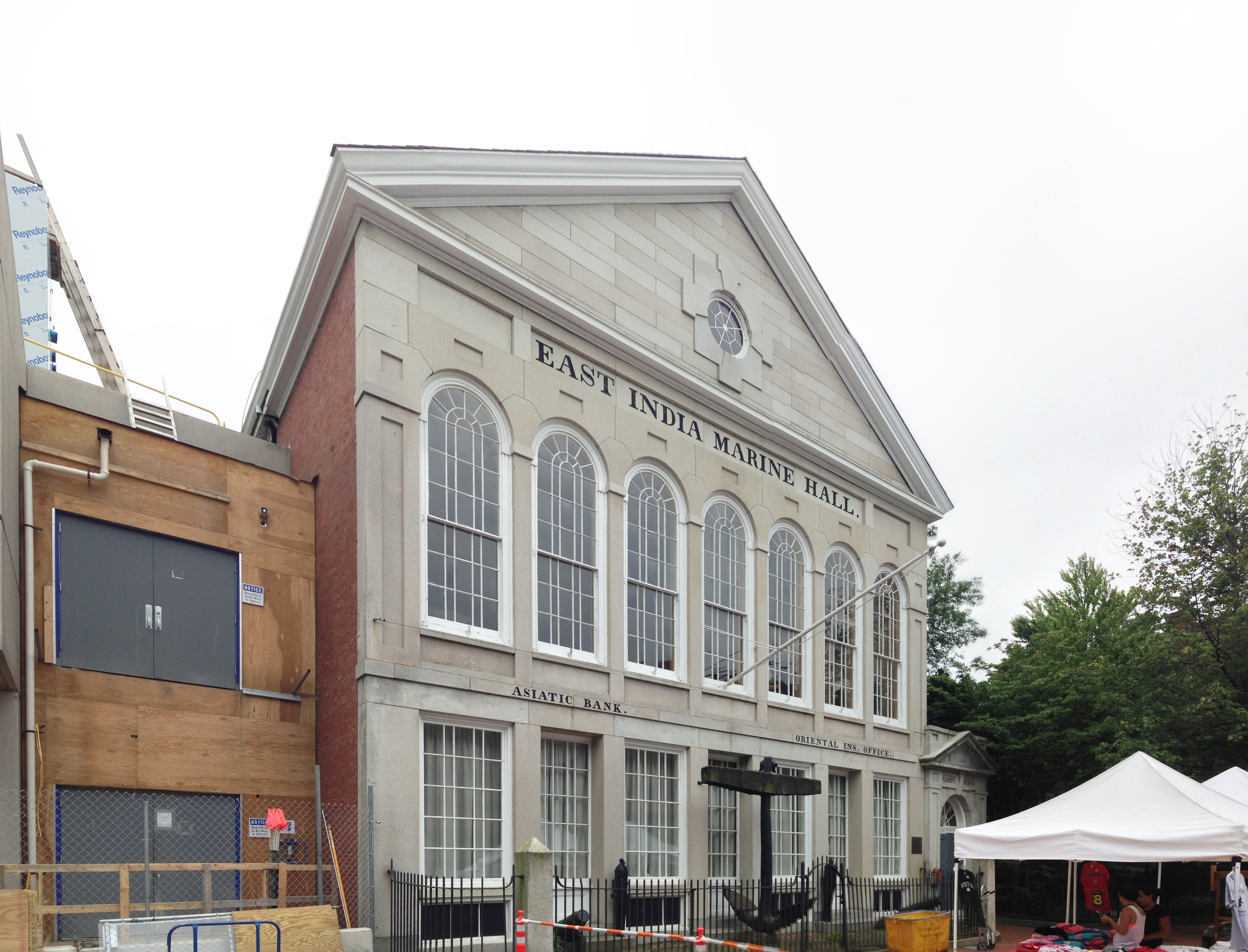
East India Marine Hall in 2013, now part of the Peabody Essex Museum

=== History ===
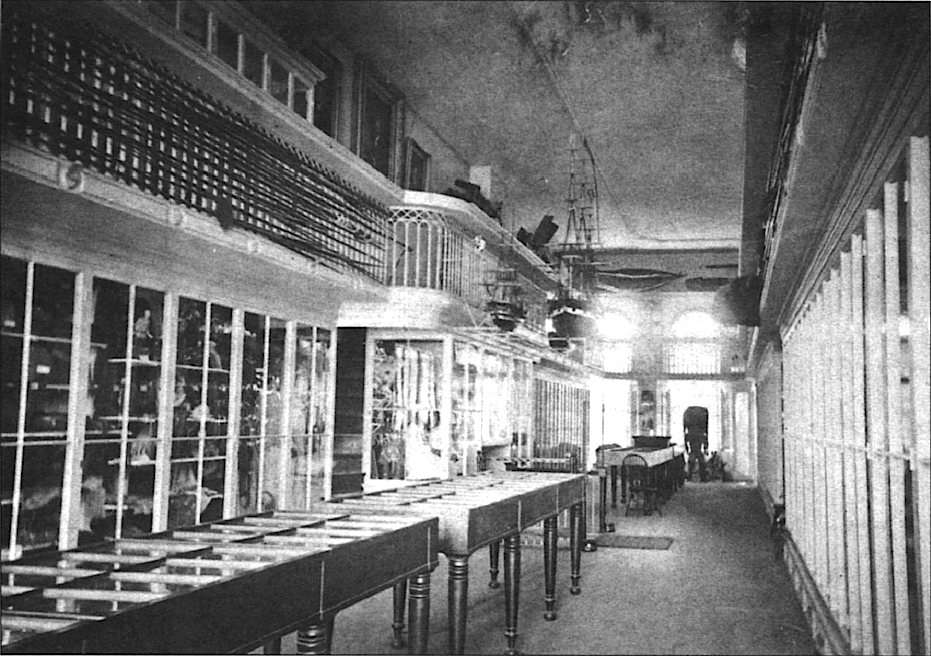
Pacific Collection, East India Marine Hall in 1876

The society founders were invested in the establishment of a museum from the beginning: their third objective was "to form a Museum of natural and artificial curiosities, particularly such as are found beyond the Cape of Good Hope and Cape Horn." Within three years, their collection had grown too large for their building, so they relocated to the Salem Bank building, constructed by Colonel Benjamin Pickman, on Essex Street.

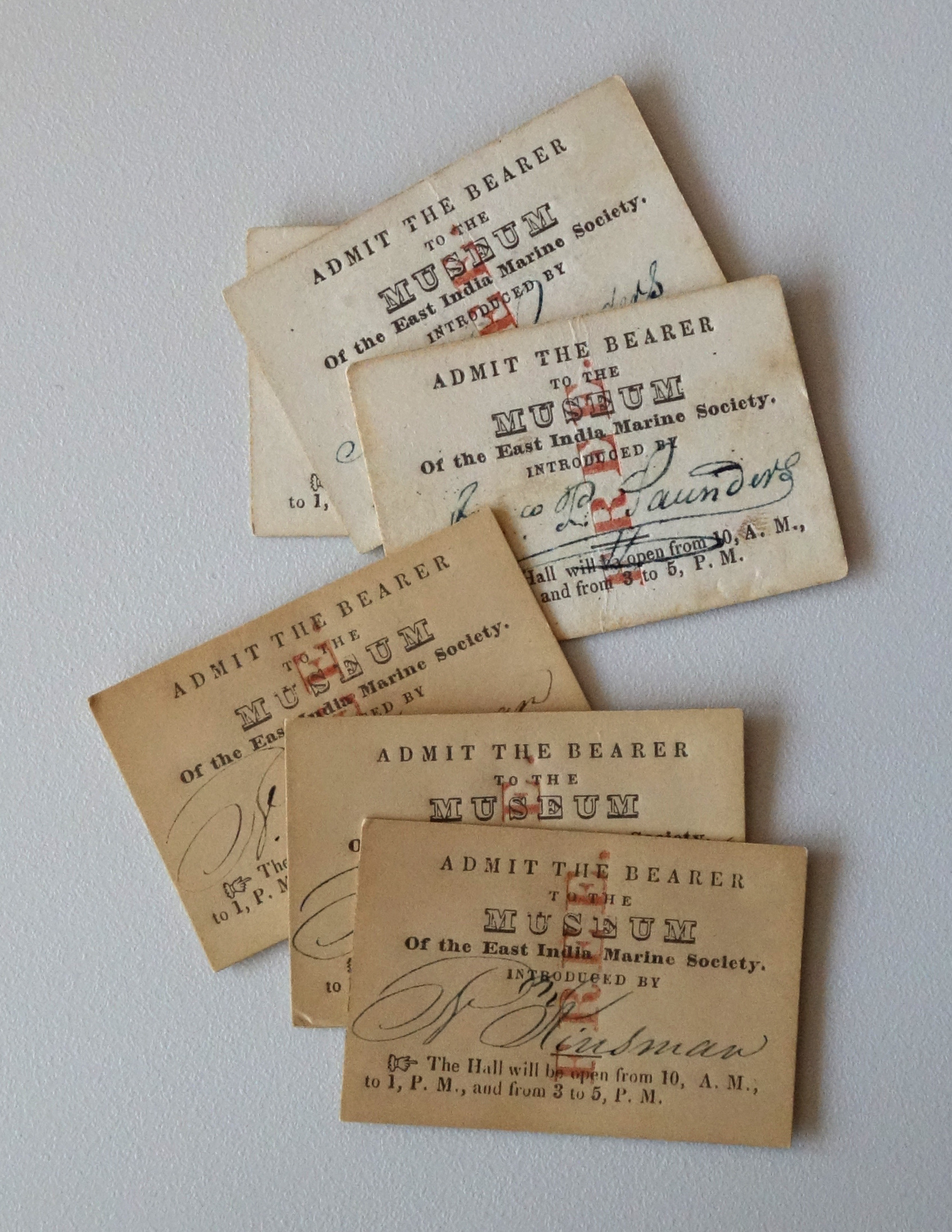
Tickets to the museum of the East India Marine Society, ca. 1825–1845

In 1825 the society dedicated the newly constructed East India Marine Hall, designed by architect Thomas Waldron Sumner. It shared the building with the Asiatic Bank and Oriental Insurance Company. Museum staff included Seth Bass, Malthus A. Ward, and Henry Wheatland.

The museum existed under the East India Marine Society name from 1799 until 1867, when it was purchased by George Peabody for $140,000. The East India Marine Hall and its collections were combined with those of the Essex Institute in the fields of natural history and ethnology, and reimagined as the Peabody Academy of Science. In 1915, the Peabody Academy of Science transitioned into the Peabody Museum of Salem; after merging with the Essex Institute completely in 1992, it became the Peabody Essex Museum.

The East India Marine Society museum and its collections were significant in several ways. Firstly, the society's members were obligated to donate "curiosities" from their travels; not only did the museum help make Salem a vital location for learning about European and Asian visual and intellectual culture, it signaled America's success and prosperity in global trade. It also established that American cultural institutions were of comparable quality to their European counterparts. On a larger scale, the museum combined the economics of trade with enlightenment philosophy and was believed to have an important role in the study of science and society.

=== Collections ===
The collection was started by donations from Captain Jonathan Carnes; items as diverse as an elephant's tooth and a pipe from Sumatra set the standard for the museum's acquisitions. Because of the society's requirement for its members to donate a diverse range of objects from their travels, the collections were specifically related to their business endeavors, which explains the predominance of Pacific artifacts on display. The museum received so many objects in the first two decades of its existence that it hired a curator to fill in gaps in the collection, reorganize the displays, and create a catalogue. This catalogue of the museum's collections was published in 1821, listing 2,269 objects.

At the time of the first catalogue's publication, the society owned a variety of objects including shells; coins; other ethnological artifacts such as costume, musical instruments, statuary, weaponry; and manuscript journals of sea voyages between Salem and places including Batavia, Bombay, Calcutta, Canton, Ceylon, Isle de France, Manila, Mocha, Sumatra, and Tranquebar. Donors of objects included members, New England locals such as William Bentley, non-member seafarers such as John Derby, and others such as merchant Nusserwanjee Maneckjee of Bombay.

Ten years after the first catalogue, a second was released, with a total of 4,299 objects. These catalogues contained objects including:

==== "Natural curiosities" ====
- Ostrich eggs
- A "pregnant queen ant"
- Stuffed penguins
- Elephant tails and tusks
- "Lava from Java"
- "A hornet's nest from Surinam"
- A two-headed dogfish
- Balls of hair from the stomachs of cows from Madagascar and Salem, presumably for comparative purposes

==== "Cultural curiosities" ====
- "Fragments of granite broken from Pompey's pillar"
- Ivory pagodas
- A "model of an 80-gun ship, made from soup bones, by a prisoner at Dartmoor"
- Coins and other forms of foreign currencies
- "Specimens of white marble from the ruins of Carthage"
- A coffee cup and saucer, formerly owned by Emperor Napoleon Bonaparte
- A "very elegant hubble-bubble"
- Paintings and clothing from China, Japan, and India
- A medal with images of the devil and the Pope
- "Three thousand yards of human hair, braided"
- Female undergarments from Lapland, made from reindeer hair
- "The elaborate terminal bead of a late medieval Flemish rosary"

==== Noteworthy objects ====
The collection also included several objects that were especially valuable due to factors including rarity, origin, and historical significance. One such artifact is an idol of Kolia Moku, the medicine god, from the Sandwich Islands, donated by John T. Prince in the late 1840s. There are only two other surviving idols of this type.

One of the more notorious objects was the embalmed head of a New Zealand chief, donated by William Dana; it had to be displayed behind a veil.

An earlier object of importance to the collection is the sculpture donated by Captain Benjamin Hodges in 1790, Figure of a Chinese Man. Scholars have reported that it was one of the first sculptures to enter the American market from China.

==== Collection gaps ====
Even though the society's cultural collections largely focused on items gathered from international trade, it still displayed a small number of objects from Native American tribes. Because there was no strong financial reason to expend concerted effort on collecting Native objects, scholars have reported that the museum's representation of Eastern tribes was small and used to compare them to ancient civilizations: items such as arrowheads that had come up during excavations in New England were displayed with classical artifacts.

==== Methods of display ====
There are not many remaining records of the exhibition style of the museum, but a few observations have survived. For example, when the society moved into the newly-constructed East India Marine Hall, tall cases filled with artifacts lined the walls—often with nautical models displayed on top—and more cases were arranged in the center of the room.

In addition, the museum was decorated with life-size sculptures of merchants from China and India. They were placed in strategic locations throughout the exhibition hall, which allowed them to serve not only as objects within the collection themselves, but also as contextual aids for other objects.

Not much is known about the specific groupings of the collection prior to the 1830s; near the end of the decade, however, records state that items were displayed based on their general function, such as weaponry or musical instruments. The curator, Dr Malthus Ward, did this in an effort to assemble objects that shared similar roles in their various countries of origin.

=== Visitorship ===
The museum had no admission fee, but it required visitors to be introduced by a society member. Prominent visitors to the society's museum included William Bentley, James Silk Buckingham, Nathaniel Hawthorne, Joseph Smith, Andrew Jackson, Anne Newport Royall, and Martin Van Buren.

It was one of Salem's most vital attractions, and visitors consistently reported feelings of awe and as though they were entering a separate world: Martha Nichols, the granddaughter of Salem mariner Captain George Nichols, wrote that its "magic door opened onto so many wonders," and a guestbook from 1860 contains a visitor's opinion that "to walk around this room was to circumnavigate the globe." These impressions taught the younger generations of Salem knowledge of the global marketplace that was valued highly in the early 19th century: the possibilities for trade relations were enhanced by their prolonged exposure to foreign nations.

According to scholars, the exhibits in East India Marine Hall presented visitors with the idea that their sailors had brought them a personalized microcosm of the world. The objects and their displays were meant to do more than just illustrate the rich diversity of other cultures; they were also strongly associated with their donors. This was underscored by the presence of donor portraits hung above the objects, as well as the former sailors serving the society as tour guides. This emphasized the personal connections that surrounded the objects, and demonstrated the sailor's autonomy and success in an international arena.

==== Visitor controversies ====
The 1830s presented several challenges to the museum's relationship with its visitors. In 1833, the society created and enforced a rule that banned African Americans from attending the museum, despite the fact that it had not previously restricted their attendance. In addition, an entrance fee was briefly charged as an attempt to "remedy [the] evil" of their popularity; the more than 2,000 annual visitors, coupled with the society's responsibility to care for its members' families experiencing financial hardship, had become too difficult to maintain.

== Members ==
List of members
- William Pickman Abbott (d.1880)
- John Fiske Allen (d.1876)
- William Allen (d.1853)
- John Andrew (d.1829)
- Nathaniel Appleton (d.1809)
- George Archer (d.1833)
- Henry Archer (d.1848)
- Richard Ashton (d.1805)
- William Ashton (d.1835)
- Benjamin Balch (d.1863)
- James Barr (d.1848)
- James Barr Jr. (d.1853)
- Benjamin Barstow (d.1823)
- Charles Forrester Barstow (d.1849)
- John Barton (d.1818)
- Samuel Barton (d.1840)
- Nathaniel A. Batchelder (d.1903)
- Joseph Beadle (d.1848)
- John Beckett Jr. (d.1815)
- Benjamin Beckford (d.1811)
- John Beckford (d.1813)
- John Beckford (d.1873)
- Samuel Benson (d.1862)
- John Bertram (1796–1882)
- Charles C. Bessell
- Thomas Bickford (d.1820)
- Ward Blackler (d.1815)
- Henry Blanchard (d.1826)
- Francis Boardman (d.1870)
- J. Ingersoll Bowditch (d.1889)
- Joseph Bowditch (d.1824)
- Nathaniel Bowditch
- Thomas Bowditch (d.1841)
- Thomas Doyle Brace (d.1867)
- Daniel Bray Jr. (d.1850)
- Holten J. Breed (d.1868)
- Henry Gardner Bridges (d.1849)
- Abner Briggs (d.1816)
- James Buffington Briggs (d.1857)
- Jeremiah Briggs (d.1844)
- Johnson Briggs
- Samuel Briggs (d.1822)
- William Collins Briggs (d.1834)
- Benjamin W. Brookhouse (d.1831)
- John Farley Brookhouse (d.1851)
- Nathaniel Brown (d.1879)
- Stephen Brown
- William Brown (d.1833)
- Timothy Bryant (d.1838)
- Timothy Bryant Jr. (d.1870)
- Benjamin Bullock (d.1818)
- George Burchmore (d.1822)
- John Burchmore (d.1802)
- Charles Burrill (d.1812)
- John Cabot, Jr.
- Jacob Caldwell (d.1842)
- John Carlton (d.1847)
- Johnathan Carnes (1756–1827)
- Benjamin Carpenter (d.1823)
- Benjamin Chapman (d.1853)
- James W. Cheever (d.1857)
- William J. Cheever (d.1902)
- Henry Chever (d.1853)
- Thomas Chipman (d.1821)
- Henry Clark (d.1802)
- John Clarke (d.1815)
- George Cleveland (d.1840)
- William Cleveland (d.1842)
- Thomas Cloutman (d.1854)
- Francis Coffin
- John Collins (d.1824)
- Caleb Cook Jr. (d.1837)
- James Cook (d.1828)
- Nathan Cook
- E.W. Cramerus
- Benjamin Crowninshield (1758–1836)
- Clifford Crowninshield (d.1809)
- Jacob Crowninshield (d.1808)
- John R. Dalling (d.1808)
- Richard Davis (d.1866)
- John Day (d.1869)
- William C. Dean (d.1831)
- Elias Hasket Derby Jr. (1766–1826)
- Samuel Gardner Derby (1767–1843)
- James Devereux (d.1846)
- John Dike
- John Dodge (d.1812)
- George Dutch
- John Henry Eagleston (d.1884)
- Henry Elkins (d.1836)
- Ephraim Emerton (d.1877)
- Charles Emery (d.1890)
- Robert Emery (d.1841)
- Charles Moses Endicott (1793–1863)
- George W. Endicott (d.1870)
- Jacob Endicott (d.1816)
- John Endicott (d.1834)
- John Endicott Jr. (d.1878)
- Lewis Endicott (d.1870)
- Samuel Endicott (d.1828)
- Samuel Endicott (d.1872)
- Timothy Endicott (d.1865)
- William Putnam Endicott (d.1888)
- Charles Henry Fabens (d.1869)
- James Murray Fairfield (d.1841)
- William Fairfield (d.1825)
- John Felt (d.1802)
- Jonathan Porter Felt (d.1860)
- Joseph Felt (d.1856)
- William Fettyplace (d.1867)
- John Brown Fisk (d.1881)
- Nathaniel Fisher Jr. (d.1810)
- Charles Forbes (d.1821)
- John Forrester (d.1837)
- John Frost (d.1880)
- Samuel Gale (d.1829)
- Richard Gardner (d.1839)
- John Gibaut (d.1805)
- John Endicott Giddings (d.1849)
- Solomon Giddings (d.1834)
- James Gilchrist (d.1826)
- James Dunlap Gillis (d.1835)
- Joshua Goodale (d.1850)
- Jonathan Goodhue (d.1848)
- Benjamin Goodhue, 3d (d.1814)
- John Goodridge (d.1828)
- Robert W. Gould (d.1873)
- George W. Grafton (d.1826)
- Samuel B. Graves (d.1825)
- William Bentley Graves (d.1872)
- George Gregerson
- Nathaniel Griffin (1796–1876)
- Samuel Groce
- John Hammond (d.1864)
- Joseph Hammond (d.1890)
- William Haskall (d.1833)
- Daniel Hathorne
- Nathaniel Hathorne Sr. (d.1808)
- Charles Hill
- Samuel Hodgdon (d.1824)
- Benjamin Hodges (d.1808)
- George Hodges (d.1827)
- George Hodges Jr. (d.1862)
- John Hodges (d.1882)
- Jonathan Hodges (d.1837)
- Joseph Hodges (d.1863)
- John Holman (d.1852)
- Thomas Franklin Hunt
- Samuel Hutchinson Jr. (d.1892)
- Jonathan Ingersoll (d.1840)
- Nathaniel Ingersoll
- William Ives
- George Washington Jenks (d.1867)
- Horace Howard Jenks (d.1849)
- Emery Johnson (d.1845)
- William O. Johnson (d.1874)
- Samuel Kennedy (d.1851)
- James Staniford Kimball (d.1875)
- Thomas Kimball (d.1885)
- Henry King (d.1834)
- James King (d.1873)
- Robert Watts King (d.1842)
- Joshua Kinsman (d.1841)
- Nathaniel Kinsman (d.1808)
- Nathaniel Kinsman (d.1847)
- Nathaniel Joshua Kinsman
- Joseph Jenkins Knapp (d.1847)
- Joseph Jenkins Knapp Jr. (d.1830)
- Jonathan Lambert (d.1813)
- Samuel Lambert (d.1832)
- Benjamin Lander (d.1816)
- Peter Lander Jr. (d.1832)
- William Lander Jr. (d.1834)
- Charles Lawrence (d.1879)
- Benjamin Ropes Leach (d.1838)
- Nathan Leach (d.1826)
- Henry Leavitt (d.1830)
- Josiah Lovett 2nd (d.1854)
- William H. Low (d.1834)
- Charles Mansfield (d.1868)
- John Tucker Mansfield (d.1839)
- Azor Marshall (d.1833)
- John Marshall (d.1850)
- Jonathan Mason (d.1808)
- William McMullen (d.1862)
- Richard Meek
- William Messervey (d.1852)
- Charles Millet (d.1878)
- Thomas Moriarty (d.1849)
- Charles D. Mugford (d.1868)
- William Mugford (d.1841)
- Theodore Augustus Neal (d.1881)
- William Henry Neal (d.1851)
- Gilbert Grafton Newhall (d.1864)
- George Nichols (d.1865)
- Henry Nichols
- Ichabod Nichols (1749–1839)
- Joseph Peirce Nichols (d.1823)
- Edward Norris (d.1851)
- John Norris, Jr.
- Abijah Northey Jr. (d.1853)
- Oliver Obear (d.1849)
- Edward Orne
- Joseph Orne (d.1806)
- Josiah Orne (d.1825)
- Richard Elvins Orne
- William Putnam Orne (d.1815)
- William Osborn (d.1839)
- George Osborne (d.1882)
- John B. Osgood (d.1853)
- John Osgood (d.1826)
- John F. Osgood (d.1894)
- Thomas Binney Osgood (d.1818)
- William Osgood (d.1834)
- Jeremiah Lee Page (d.1866)
- Jeremiah Page (d.1867)
- John Porter Page (d.1838)
- Nathaniel Page (d.1823)
- William Bradstreet Parker (d.1878)
- Brackley Rose Peabody (d.1874)
- John Peabody (d.1821)
- Samuel Endicott Peabody (d.1909)
- Charles Pearson
- Jonathan Willard Peele (d.1871)
- George Peirce (d.1822)
- George Peirce (d.1858)
- William P. Peirce (d.1859)
- Augustine S. Perkins (d.1886)
- Augustus Perry (d.1871)
- Samuel Perry (d.1821)
- Stephen Phillips (1764–1838)
- Joseph Phippen (d.1813)
- Dudley Leavitt Pickman
- Francis W. Pickman
- William Dudley Pickman (d.1890)
- Philip Payn Pinel (d.1864)
- Joseph Preston (d.1840)
- Henry Prince (d.1846)
- Henry Prince Jr. (d.1854)
- John Prince
- John Prince Jr.
- William Henry Prince (d.1815)
- Thomdike Procter (d.1834)
- Allen Putnam (d.1868)
- Hiram Putnam
- Samuel R. Putnam (d.1861)
- Thomas Putnam (1763–1822)
- Samuel Rea (d.1842)
- Alfred A. Reed
- Thomas Woodbridge Rhea
- George Dodge Richardson
- William P. Richardson (d.1826)
- William Richardson (d.1807)
- John Robinson (d.1846)
- Nathan Robinson (d.1835)
- William Robinson
- John D. Rogers (d.1847)
- John Whittingham Rogers
- Nathaniel Leverett Rogers (d.1858)
- Richard Dennison Rogers (d.1892)
- Richard Saltonstall Rogers (d.1873)
- William C. Rogers (d.1888)
- Benjamin Gardner Ropes (d.1871)
- George Ropes (d.1807)
- George Ropes (d.1896)
- Henry Ropes (d.1861)
- John Ropes (d.1828)
- Jonathan Millett Ropes
- Joseph Ropes (d.1850)
- William Ropes (d.1869)
- Charles Roundy (d.1886)
- Thomas Ruee
- William Russell
- Daniel Sage (d.1836)
- Thomas Saul (d.1875)
- Charles Saunders (d.1864)
- Daniel Saunders (d.1825)
- George T. Saunders (d.1856)
- Jonathan Peal Saunders (d.1844)
- Thomas Mason Saunders
- Charles T. Savage
- Benjamin Shillaber (d.1840)
- John Shillaber Jr. (d.1853)
- Benjamin Hodges Silsbee (d.1880)
- John Boardman Silsbee (d.1867)
- Nathaniel Silsbee
- Nathaniel Devereux Silsbee (d.1912)
- Peter Silver (d.1883)
- Samuel Skerry (d.1808)
- William Skerry (d.1841)
- George Girdler Smith (d.1810)
- Jesse Smith (d.1844)
- Jesse Smith 3rd (d.1829)
- William R. Smith
- Nicholas T. Snell (d.1880)
- John Story (d.1858)
- William Story (d.1860)
- James Stuart
- John Swasey (d.1888)
- Benjamin Swett (d.1820)
- Enoch Swett (d.1803)
- Nicholas Thorndike (d.1818)
- Henry Tibbetts (d.1842)
- Solomon Towne (d.1835)
- Moses Townsend (d.1842)
- Charles Treadwell (d.1855)
- John White Treadwell (d.1857)
- Samuel Dudley Tucker (d.1857)
- Benjamin Vanderford (d.1842)
- Samuel Varney (d.1875)
- Samuel Wait (d.1826)
- Edward D. Waldo (d.1859)
- Andrew Ward (d.1860)
- Gamaliel H. Ward
- Thomas Wren Ward
- William Ward
- Richard Ward Jr. (d.1822)
- William R.L. Ward (d.1897)
- John G. Waters (d.1860)
- Richard Palmer Waters (d.1887)
- William D. Waters (d.1880)
- Benjamin Webb Jr. (d.1827)
- John Felt Webb (d.1861)
- Joseph Webb (d.1846)
- William George Webb (d.1896)
- Timothy Wellman, 3d
- Edward West (d.1844)
- Thomas West (d.1849)
- Richard Wheatland (d.1830)
- Richard Wheatland (1786–1861)
- Henry White (d.1826)
- John White (d.1840)
- Joseph White, Jr. (d.1816)
- Stephen White (1787–1841)
- Henry Trask Whittredge (d.1830)
- Stephen Wilkins (d.1868)
- Aaron Wait Williams (d.1830)
- Israel Williams (d.1831)
- Nathaniel W. Williams
- John Winn (d.1835)
- Joseph Winn (d.1880)

== Vessels ==
List of vessels associated with the society
- Active
- Adventure
- America
- Anna
- Arab
- Astrea
- B. Telemachus
- Belisarius
- Bengal
- Bonetta
- Caravan
- Caroline
- Catherine
- Ceres
- Cincinatus
- Clio
- Commerce
- Cordelia
- Derby
- Edwin
- Elizabeth
- Emerald
- Essex
- Exeter
- Factor
- Fame
- Fanny
- Francis
- Franklin
- Friendship
- George
- Georgetown
- Hazard
- Hope
- Indus
- Java
- John
- Jones
- Laura
- Lucia
- Lydia
- Magnet
- Malay
- Margaret
- Mary
- Mentor
- Minerva
- Nancy Ann
- Osprey
- Pallas
- Persia
- Phenix
- Pompey
- Putnam
- Reaper
- Reboreas
- Recovery
- Restitution
- Reward
- Roscoe
- Suffolk
- Sukey
- Two Brothers
- Ulysses
- Venus
- Virginia

== In popular culture ==
Nathaniel Hawthorne described a fictionalized version of the society's museum in his 1842 short story A Virtuoso's Collection.
