= David Burnham House =

Historic house in Massachusetts, United States

- U.S. National Register of Historic Places
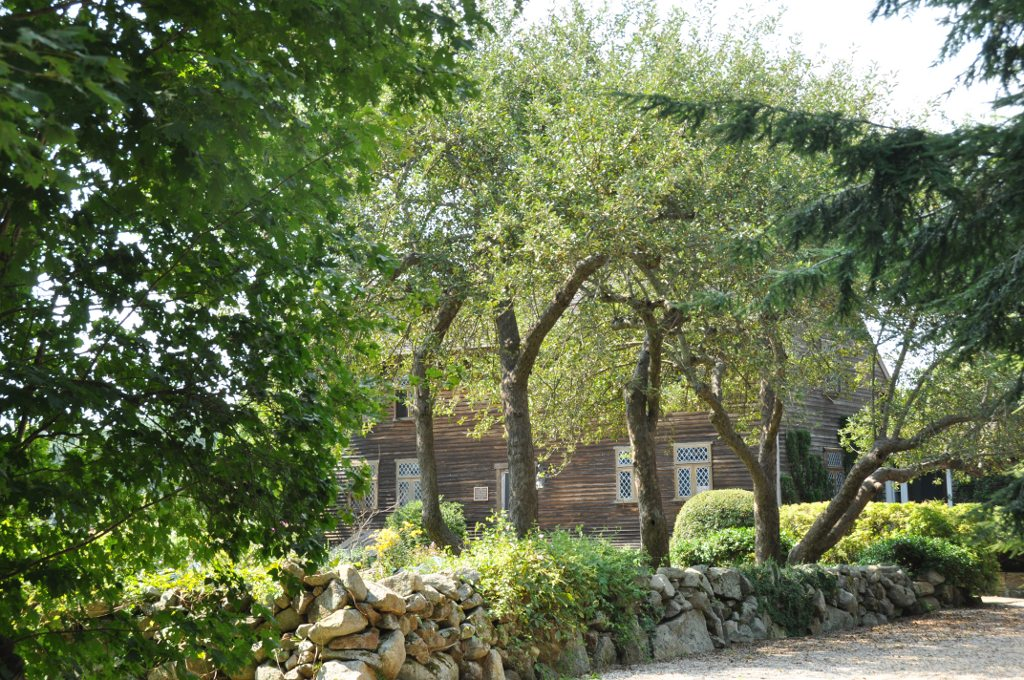

- Location within Massachusetts Location within the United States
- Location: Essex, Massachusetts
- Coordinates: 42°36′57″N 70°48′7″W
- Built: 1685
- NRHP reference No.: 83000574
- Added to NRHP: July 30, 1983

The David Burnham House is a historic First Period house on Pond Street in Essex, Massachusetts. The two story five bay wood frame colonial is said to have been built c. 1685 by David Burnham, son of Thomas Burnham, an early settler of the Essex area. The house remained in the Burnham family for almost 150 years. It was the subject of restoration work in the early 20th century by the Essex Institute under the auspices of George Francis Dow. At this time its kitchen fireplace, said to be the largest known in Essex County was uncovered. Modern facilities were added to the house in the 1960s.

The house was added to the National Register of Historic Places in 1983.

== See also ==
- National Register of Historic Places listings in Essex County, Massachusetts
