= Frank Cousins (photographer) =

American writer and photographer

Frank Cousins (July 1, 1851 – June 6, 1925) was an American writer and photographer of Federal style architecture in New England. Cousins's photographs added to the preservation movement in the early 1900s by documenting buildings and a style of architecture that was in danger of being demolished. He was born, lived, and worked in Salem, MA.

== Biography ==
As a young man he worked in the dry goods store, J.B. & S.D. Shepard. Cousins and his brothers opened their own general store at 170-174 Essex Street in Salem in 1868. His brothers died and Cousins continued to run the store and called it Frank Cousins Bee Hive or "Frank Cousins's Bee Hive". As his business became more successful he was able to indulge in his interests in studying New England architecture through writing and photography.

Over the course of his life he took tens of thousands of images and sold them at his store and to more specific audiences (architects, publishers, libraries) through his business "Frank Cousins Art Company." He published books and photographic albums on colonial architecture. Some of these photo albums were salesman's order books for his company Frank Cousins Art Co. and these featured houses in Salem, Marblehead, Danvers, Waltham, and Peabody focusing on architectural details. He photographed many Samuel McIntire homes in Salem. In addition to New England, subjects of his images included landmarks and architecture in Baltimore, Philadelphia, New York City, and other locations in the eastern United States as well as in Europe. In 1913, he was commissioned by the Art Commission of New York City to document buildings that were to be demolished. He was interested in locales related to Nathaniel Hawthorne, famous author from Salem, MA. He also photographed historic homes and museums such as the Peabody Museum and the Essex Institute.

== Books published ==
- Cousins, Frank and Phil M. Riley. The Colonial Architecture of Salem. Boston: Little, Brown, and Company, 1916.
- Cousins, Frank and Phil M. Riley. The Wood-Carver of Salem: Samuel McIntire, His Life and Work. Boston: Little, Brown, and Company, 1916.
- Cousins, Frank. Colonial Architecture, Series 1: Fifty Salem Doorways, Garden City, N.Y., Doubleday, Page & Co., 1912.

== Exhibitions ==
- A New View: Architecture Photography from the National Museums in Berlin, Museum of Photography in Berlin, 2010.

== Further sources ==
=== Articles ===
- Jessen, Peter (1916). Reisestudien. III. Der amerikanische Kolonialstil. Kunstgewerbeblatt NF 28(3):41–48.

=== Archival collections ===
- Peabody Essex Museum, Phillips Library, The Frank Cousins Collection of Glass Plate Negatives
- Frank Cousins Photographs, David M. Rubenstein Rare Book & Manuscript Library, Duke University
- Colonial architecture of the United States: photo album, Columbia University

=== News clippings ===
- Recognition won by Frank Cousins, editorial endorsement accorded him by New York magazine for pictures of Salem subjects. Salem News, November 15, 1911.
- Obituary of Frank Cousins, Salem Evening News, June 8, 1925.
