= Frank Cousins =

Frank Cousins may refer to:

- Frank Cousins (British politician) (1904–1986), British trade union leader and Labour politician
- Frank Cousins (American politician) (born 1958), American politician who served as the Essex County, Massachusetts Sheriff
- Frank Cousins (photographer) (1851–1925), American writer and photographer of Federal style architecture in New England

== See also ==
- Frank Couzens (1902–1950), mayor of Detroit, Michigan
