= A Virtuoso's Collection =

Short story by Nathaniel Hawthorne

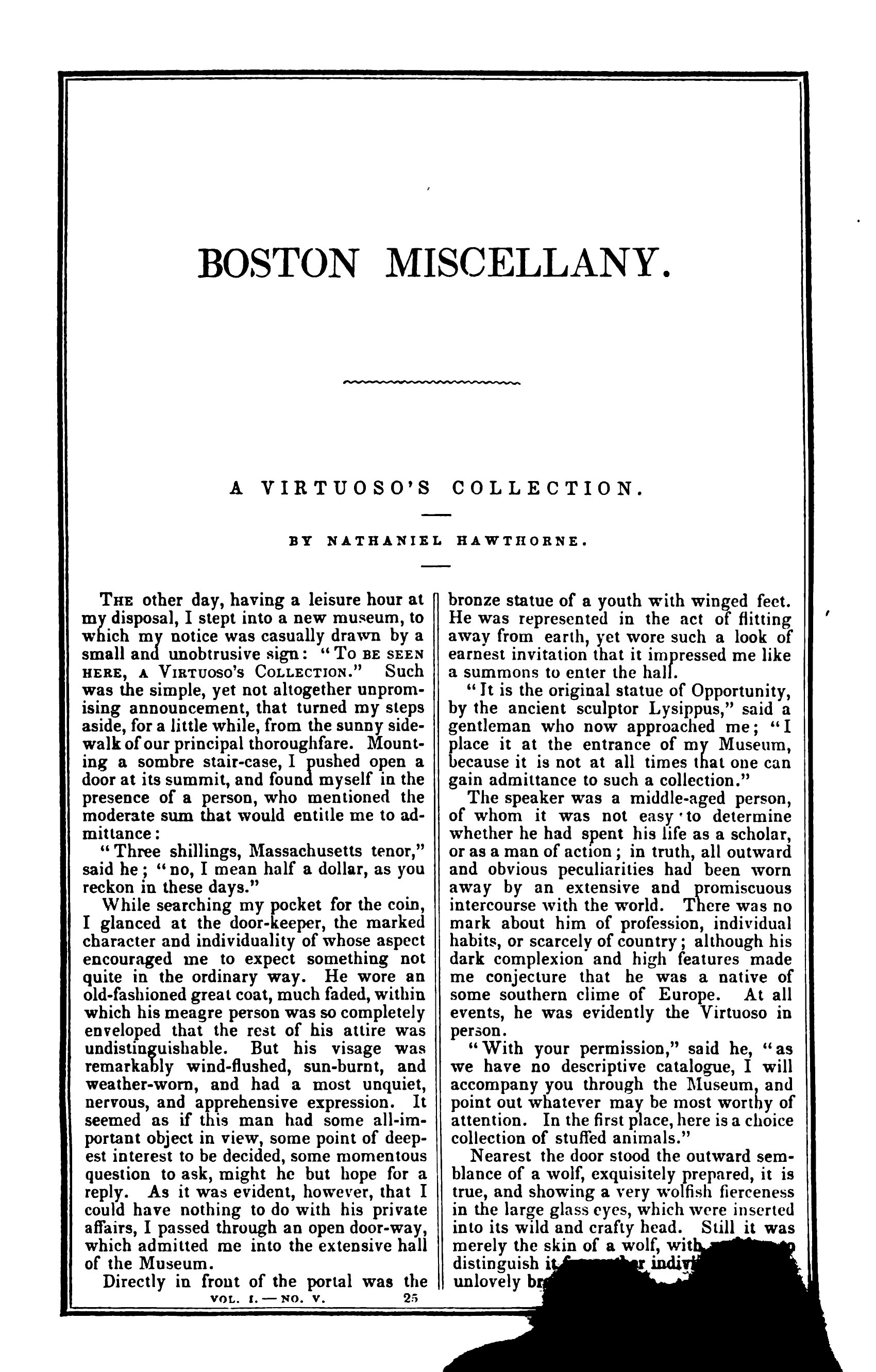
First page of "A Virtuoso's Collection" by American author Nathaniel Hawthorne, as first published in The Boston Miscellany of Literature and Fashion, May 1842

"A Virtuoso's Collection" is a short story by American writer Nathaniel Hawthorne. It was first published in Boston Miscellany of Literature and Fashion, I (May 1842), 193–200, and later included as the final story in the compilation Mosses from an Old Manse.

== Summary ==
An unnamed narrator visits a new museum promising "a virtuoso's collection" on display. After paying an admission fee, he enters the museum and meets the virtuoso himself, who serves as his guide. The items include taxidermied animals, articles of clothing, and weapons. The virtuoso turns out to be the Wandering Jew.

== Analysis ==
The story references a number of historical and mythical figures, items, beasts, books, etc. as part of a museum collection. Some scholars regard the real-life museum of the East India Marine Society in Salem, Massachusetts, as a model for Hawthorne's fictional museum.

Hawthorne's story combines elements of fantasy and satire, presenting the narrator's first‑person perspective to convey the extraordinary artifacts in the virtuoso's collection. Scholars have noted that the story reflects on human curiosity and the desire to classify and possess unusual or rare objects, while also offering subtle moral commentary.

== The collection ==
- Opportunity, by the ancient sculptor Lysippus
- The wolf that devoured Little Red Riding Hood
- The she-wolf that suckled Romulus and Remus
- Edmund Spenser's 'milk-white lamb' which Una led in The Faerie Queene
- Alexander the Great's Bucephalus
- Don Quixote's horse Rosinante
- The donkey from William Wordsworth's Peter Bell: A Tale
- The donkey from Book of Numbers chapter 22 that was beaten by Balaam
- Argus, Ulysses' dog
- Cerberus
- The fox from Aesop's fable "The Fox Who Lost Its Tail"
- Dr. Samuel Johnson's cat Hodge
- The cat who saved Muhammad from a snake, or Muezza, the Prophet's pet. Perhaps both cats are in the collection.
- Thomas Gray's inspiration for the poem "Ode on the Death of a Favourite Cat Drowned in a Tub of Goldfishes". The cat, Selima, belonged to Horace Walpole
- Sir Walter Scott's cat Hinse
- Puss in Boots
- Bast, the Egyptian sun and war goddess, in her cat form
- George Gordon Byron's pet bear
- The Erymanthean Boar
- St. George's Dragon. See Saint George and the Dragon
- Python
- The serpent which tempted Eve
- The horns of the stag poached by Shakespeare
- The shell of the tortoise that supposedly killed Aeschylus
- Apis, an Egyptian bull-deity
- "The cow with the crumpled horn" from the nursery rhyme "This Is The House That Jack Built"
- The cow that jumped over the Moon from the nursery rhyme "Hey Diddle Diddle"
- A griffin
- The dove that brought the olive branch to Noah to signify that the flood was receding
- Grip, the raven that belonged to Barnaby Rudge and later inspired Edgar Allan Poe's "The Raven"
- The raven in which the soul of George I of Great Britain revisited his love, Melusine von der Schulenburg, Duchess of Kendal after his death
- Minerva's owl
- The vulture (or eagle) that daily ate Prometheus's liver
- The sacred ibis of Egypt
- One of the Stymphalian birds shot by Hercules. See Labours of Hercules
- Percy Bysshe Shelley's skylark from "To a Skylark"
- William Cullen Bryant's water-fowl from "To a Waterfowl"
- A pigeon, preserved by Nathaniel Parker Willis, from the belfry of Old South Church in Boston
- The albatross from Samuel Taylor Coleridge's The Rime of the Ancient Mariner
- A domestic goose from the temple of Juno on the Capitoline Hill. Livy claimed these geese saved Rome from the Gauls around 390 BC.
- Robinson Crusoe's parrot
- A live phoenix
- A footless bird of paradise or Huma bird
- The peacock that once contained the soul of Pythagoras

== Editions ==
- Nathaniel Hawthorne (May 1842). "A Virtuoso's Collection". Boston Miscellany. 1. hdl:2027/nyp.33433081753711.
