= Divinity Hall, Harvard Divinity School =

- Divinity Hall
- U.S. National Register of Historic Places
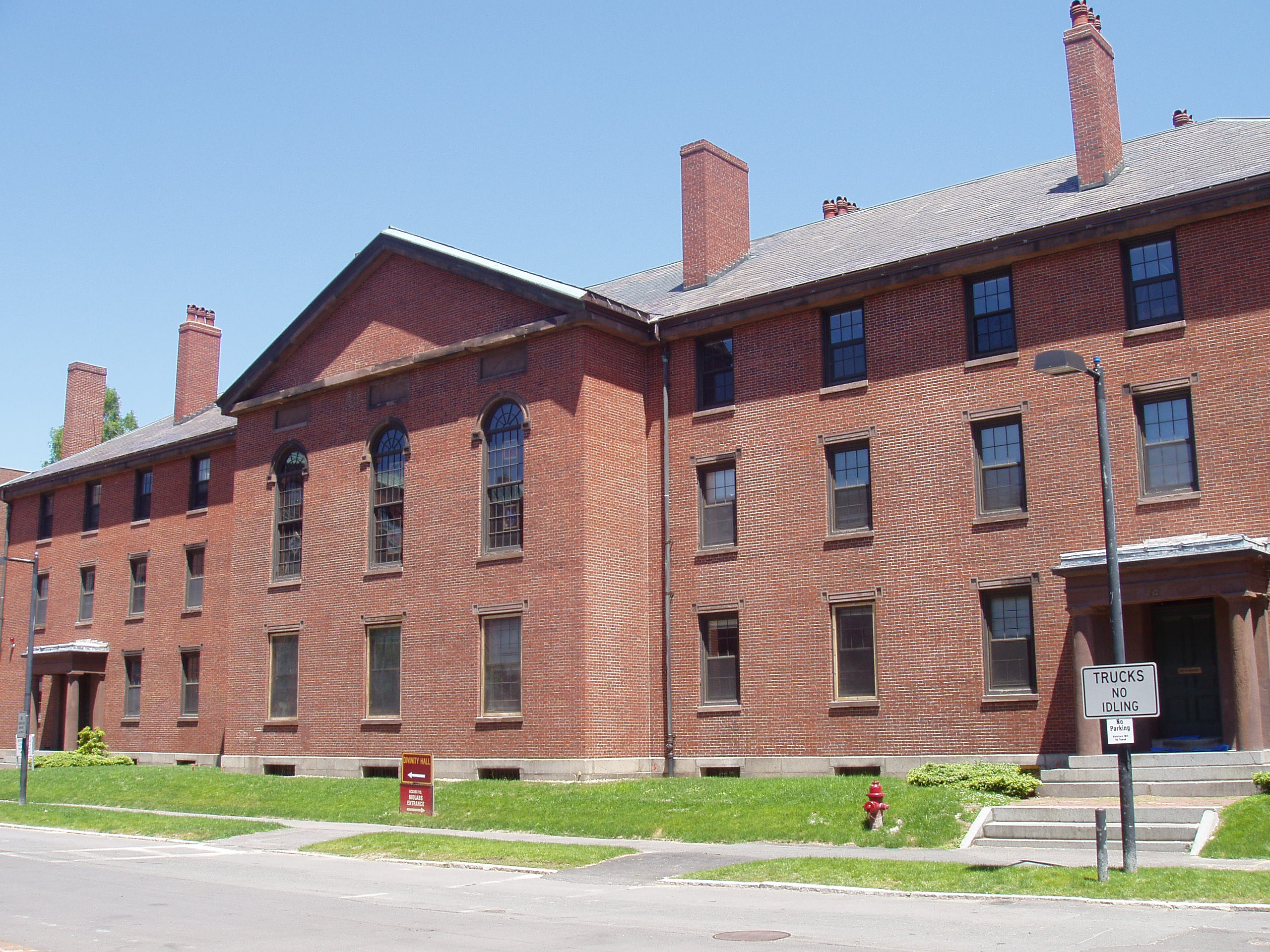
- Divinity Hall

- Location within Massachusetts Location within the United States
- Location: Cambridge, Massachusetts
- Coordinates: 42°22′43″N 71°06′51″W
- Built: 1825
- Architect: Willard, Solomon; Sumner, Thomas W.
- Architectural style: Greek Revival, Federal
- MPS: Cambridge MRA
- NRHP reference No.: 86002071
- Added to NRHP: September 12, 1986

Divinity Hall, built in 1826, is the oldest building in the Harvard Divinity School at Harvard University. It is located at 14 Divinity Avenue, Cambridge, Massachusetts.

The Hall was designed by Solomon Willard and Thomas Sumner, and dedicated on August 29, 1826, with William Ellery Channing giving the dedicatory speech, "The Christian Ministry." It was the first Harvard building constructed outside Harvard Yard. As George Huntston Williams wrote in his 1954 history of the Divinity School, theological students needed to be isolated from undergraduates lest they drink up "more of the spirit of the University than of the spirit of their profession." A decade later, on July 15, 1838, Ralph Waldo Emerson delivered his famous Divinity School Address, "Acquaint Thyself at First Hand with Deity," in the Hall.

The building is a rectangular two-story brick building, laid in Flemish bond, with only minimal brownstone trim. It has a hip roof that is only broken by a gable at the center of the long side, part of a projecting central section three bays wide. The build has a pair of entrances on either side of this central section, which are framed by Greek Revival Doric porticos.

In its early days, Divinity Hall contained the entire Divinity School. It was later used as a dormitory, then classrooms. Notable residents have included Ralph Waldo Emerson, Theodore Parker, and philosopher George Santayana. Its chapel contains a fine organ by George S. Hutchings, recently restored.

Today, the building houses classrooms, faculty offices, and several administrative offices, including the Office of Ministry Studies, the Office of Religion and Public Life, and the Office of Diversity, Inclusion and Belonging.

== See also ==
- National Register of Historic Places listings in Cambridge, Massachusetts
