= Daniel Appleton White =

American politician (1776–1861)

Daniel White
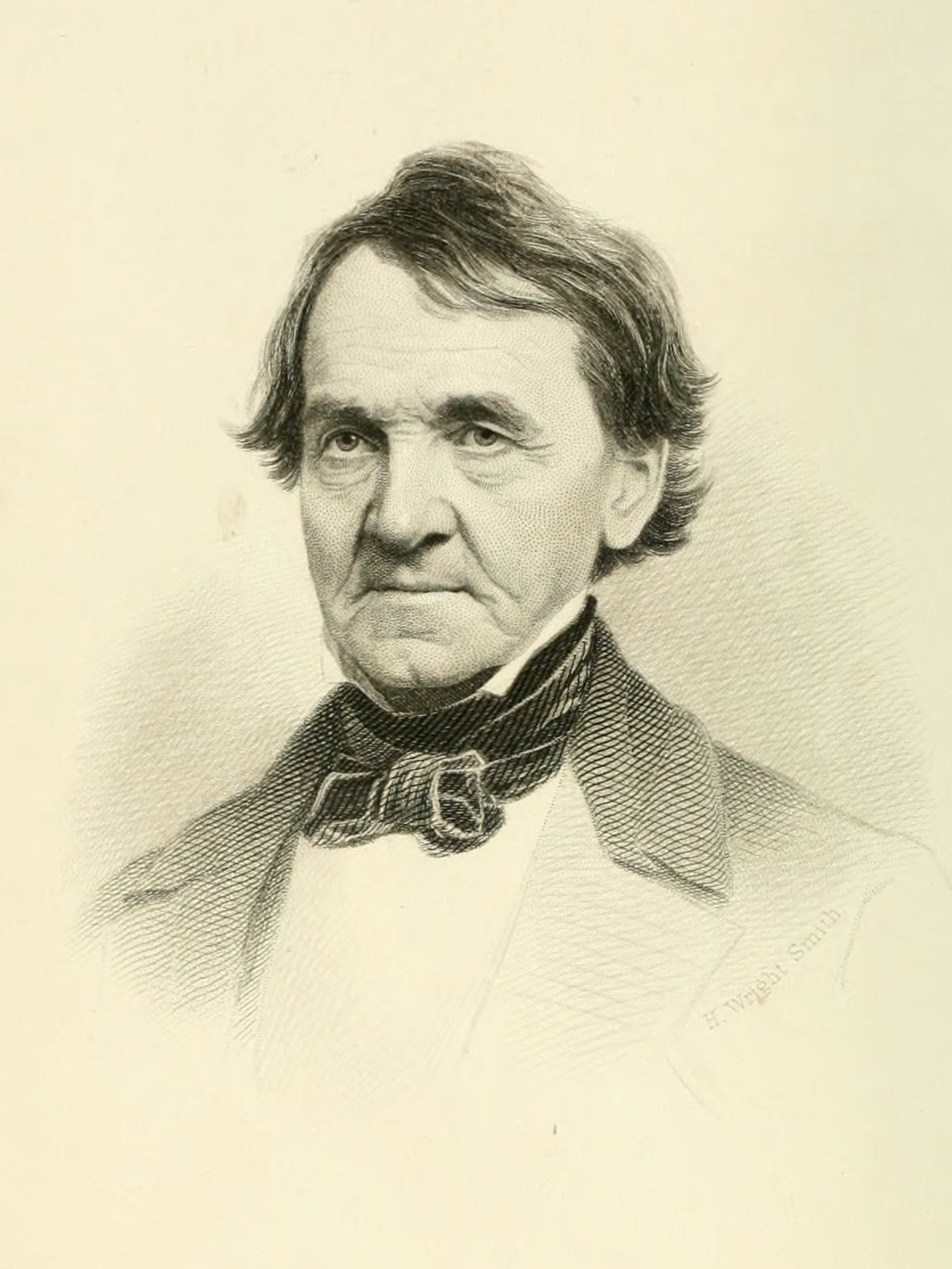

Member-elect of the U.S. House of Representatives from Massachusetts's 3rd district
- Declined to serve
- Preceded by: Timothy Pickering
- Succeeded by: Jeremiah Nelson

Personal details
- Born: Daniel Appleton White; June 7, 1776 Methuen, Massachusetts Bay, British America
- Died: March 30, 1861 (aged 84) Salem, Massachusetts, U.S.
- Party: Federalist
- Spouse(s): Mary van Schalkwyck (m. 1807; died 1811) Eliza Wetmore (m. 1819; died 1821) Ruth Rogers (m. 1824)
- Children: 3
- Education: Harvard University (LLB)

Daniel Appleton White (7 June 1776 – 30 March 1861) was an American statesman, lawyer, and Judge of Probate in Essex County, Massachusetts during the nineteenth century. He was elected as a member of the Massachusetts Senate and later elected to Congress but he resigned from the position to become the Judge of Probate for Essex County—a position he held for 38 years. As well as making a successful political and legal career in his own right, Daniel White is a descendant of William White, who settled in Massachusetts in 1635 and was a founding father of Haverhill, Massachusetts in 1640.

== Early life and family ==
=== Birth ===
Daniel White was born on 7 June 1776 in Methuen, Massachusetts to John and Elizabeth (Haynes) White.

=== Education ===
He graduated with a law degree in Harvard University in 1797. In 1837, some 40 years after he first graduated from Harvard, the university awarded him the Honorary Doctorate of LLD in recognition of his achievements in the field.

=== Family ===
White married three times altogether. He married his first wife, Mary van Schalkwyck (the daughter of Dr Josiah Wilder), on 24 May 1807 and had two daughters with him. Some years after van Schalkwyck's death on 29 June 1811, White married Eliza Wetmore (the daughter of William Orne) on 1 August 1819 in Salem.

Like his White's first wife, Wetmore died very soon after marrying him. White was made a widower for the second time after Eliza's death on 27 March 1821. Before her death, though, White and Wetmore had a son together named Henry. White's third and final wife was Ruth Rogers whom he married on 24 January 1824. White and Rogers remained married until White's death in March 1861.

== Political and legal career ==
=== Massachusetts Senate ===
White was a member of the Massachusetts Senate from 1810 to 1815.

=== Congress ===
In November 1814, he was elected to Congress as the Federalist Party's nomination for the District of Essex North. Being offered the position as Judge of Probate for the County of Essex in 1815, he decided to resign from his position with Congress to take up the role despite protests from some of his friends.

=== Judge of Probate ===
As well as making strides in legal and political spheres, he was influential in the founding of the Essex Institute in Salem which, in turn, played a significant role in establishing the Essex Historical and Natural-Historical Societies. Appointed by Governor Strong in November 1815, White remained the county's judge of probate until 1 July 1853 after 38 years on the bench—longer than any of his predecessors. He ultimately played a significant role in the Probate Court, and legal society generally, throughout his career.

== Essex County Lyceum and the Essex Institute ==
White was a founding member of the Essex County Lyceum, 'the pioneer in the system of public lectures and... [promised] to be potent among the educational and moral influences of the time.' Although not its founder, he was the president of the Essex Institute from its formation in 1848 until his death.

== Death and burial ==
Having moved from Newburyport on 3 January 1817, Daniel eventually died in Salem on 30 March 1861.

U.S. House of Representatives
Preceded by Timothy Pickering	Member-elect of the U.S. House of Representatives from Massachusetts's 3rd congressional district 1814–1815	Succeeded by Jeremiah Nelson
