= Peabody Museum of Salem =

- U.S. National Register of Historic Places
- U.S. National Historic Landmark
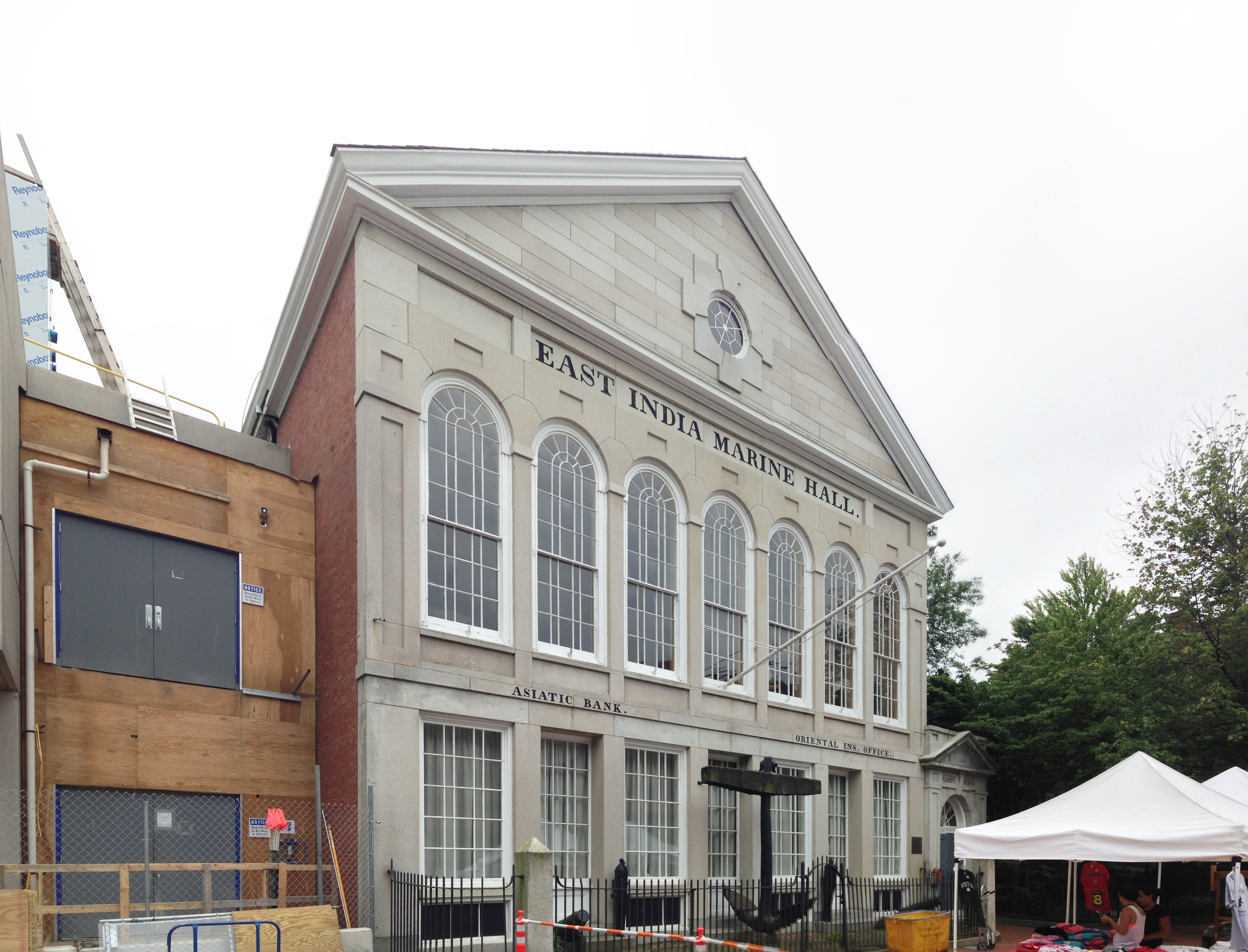
- View of East India Marine Hall exterior, 2013

- Location within Massachusetts Location within the United States
- Location: Essex St., Salem, Massachusetts
- Coordinates: 42°31′18″N 70°53′36″W
- Area: 1 acre (0.40 ha)
- Built: 1825
- NRHP reference No.: 66000783

Significant dates
- Added to NRHP: October 15, 1966
- Designated NHL: December 21, 1965

The Peabody Museum of Salem (1915–1992), formerly the Peabody Academy of Science (1865–1915), was a museum and antiquarian society based in Salem, Massachusetts. The academy was organized in part as a successor to the East India Marine Society (founded 1799), which had become moribund but held a large collection of maritime materials in a museum collection at the East India Marine Hall, built in 1825 on Essex Street. The Peabody Museum was merged with the Essex Institute to form the Peabody Essex Museum in 1992. The East India Marine Hall, now embedded within the latter's modern structure, was designated a National Historic Landmark in 1965 in recognition of this heritage, which represents the nation's oldest continuously-operating museum collection.

== History ==
The Peabody Academy of Science (1868–1915), successor to the East India Marine Society, "was organized in 1868, having received funds ... from George Peabody of London ... for the 'promotion of science and useful knowledge in the county of Essex.'" It was incorporated by "Asa Gray, of Cambridge, William C. Endicott, of Salem, George Peabody Russell, of Salem, Othniel C. Marsh, of New Haven, ... Henry Wheatland, of Salem, Abner C. Goodell, junior, of Salem, James R. Nichols, of Haverhill, ... Henry C. Perkins, of Newburyport, and S. Endicott Peabody.

The academy maintained a museum that displayed animals, fossils, minerals, and plants, as well as ethnological artifacts such as weapons, costumes, tools, statuary, and musical instruments. In 1915, the Academy changed its name to the "Peabody Museum of Salem."

As of 1949, the museum organized its holdings into three departments: ethnology, maritime history, and natural history. The museum's ethnology division included specimens from Hawaii, Japan, Marquesas Islands, and New Zealand.

The museum displayed its collections in the East India Marine Hall, expanded in 1953 with the Crowninshield Galleries. Museum staff included Ernest Stanley Dodge and Walter Muir Whitehill.

In 1984 the China Trade Museum of Milton, Massachusetts, merged with the Peabody Museum. In 1992 the Peabody Museum merged with the Essex Institute to form the Peabody Essex Museum.

== East India Marine Hall ==
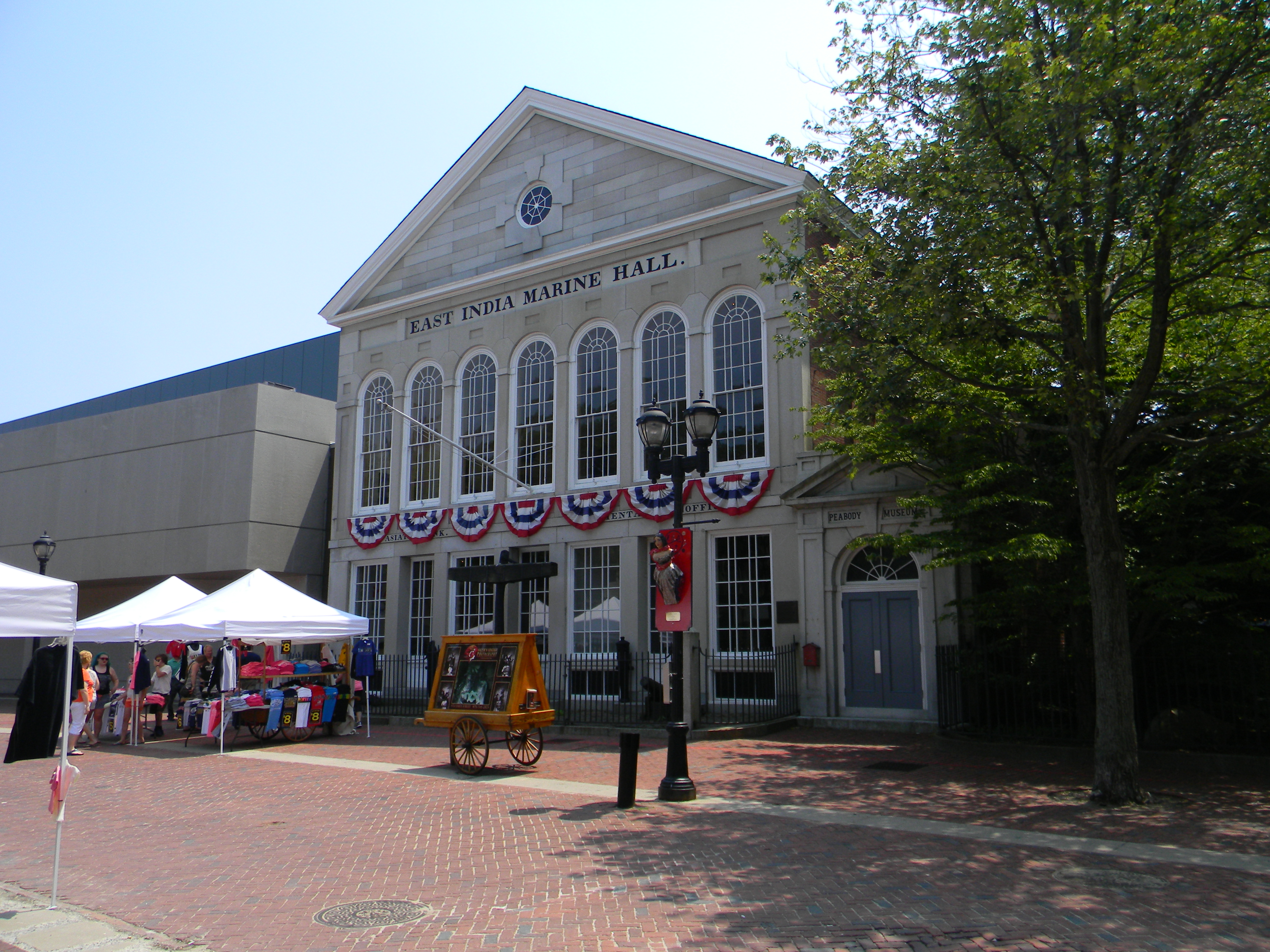
East India Marine Hall, 2015

The East India Marine Hall was built in 1824–25 for the East India Marine Society to house its collection. Design of the building has most recently been ascribed to Thomas Waldron Sumner. It stands on the south side of Essex Street and is now integrated into the body of the Peabody Essex Museum. As built, it was a two-story structure, faced in granite on the front (Essex Street facade), and brick on the sides, measuring about 45 by 100 feet (14 m × 30 m). The main facade has been preserved; it has six rectangular bays on the main floor and seven tall, round-arch windows on the second level. The gable pediment is fully enclosed, with a round window in the tympanum.

The interior of the building has been repeatedly altered over the years, losing a significant amount of original detail in the process. The first floor, which was originally occupied by retail businesses, was adapted as a museum space in 1867–69, following its acquisition by the Peabody Academy of Science. As part of this alteration, entrances on the main facade were closed off, and new entrances were added to the east and west. The first floor has since been completely integrated into the newer facilities built by the Peabody Essex Museum in the 2000s. The upper level of the hall, designed as a ballroom and auditorium space, has always been retained as a large open gallery, but lost a significant amount of historic fabric in the 1860s alterations.

The hall was designated a National Historic Landmark in 1965, and listed on the National Register of Historic Places in 1966, in recognition for its unique place as one of the oldest continuously-used museum spaces in the United States.

== See also ==
- American Neptune, a journal published by the museum
- List of National Historic Landmarks in Massachusetts
- National Register of Historic Places listings in Salem, Massachusetts

== Gallery ==
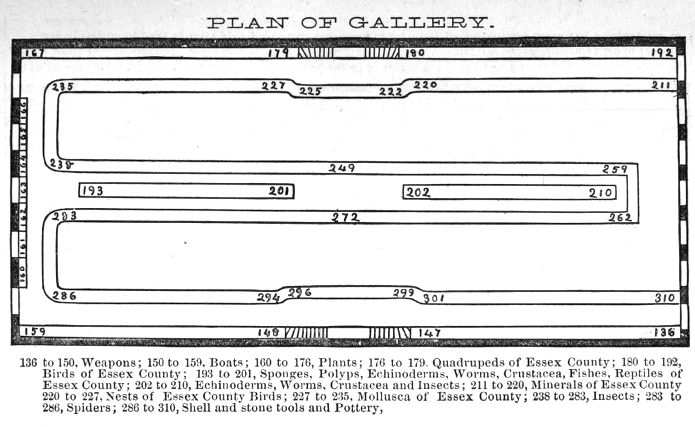
Map of part of the Museum of the Peabody Academy of Science, 1879

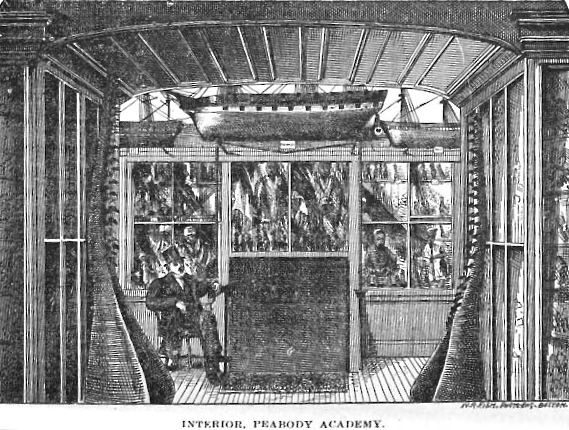
Interior, Peabody Academy, 1880

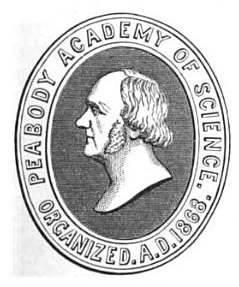
Emblem of the Peabody Academy of Science, 19th century

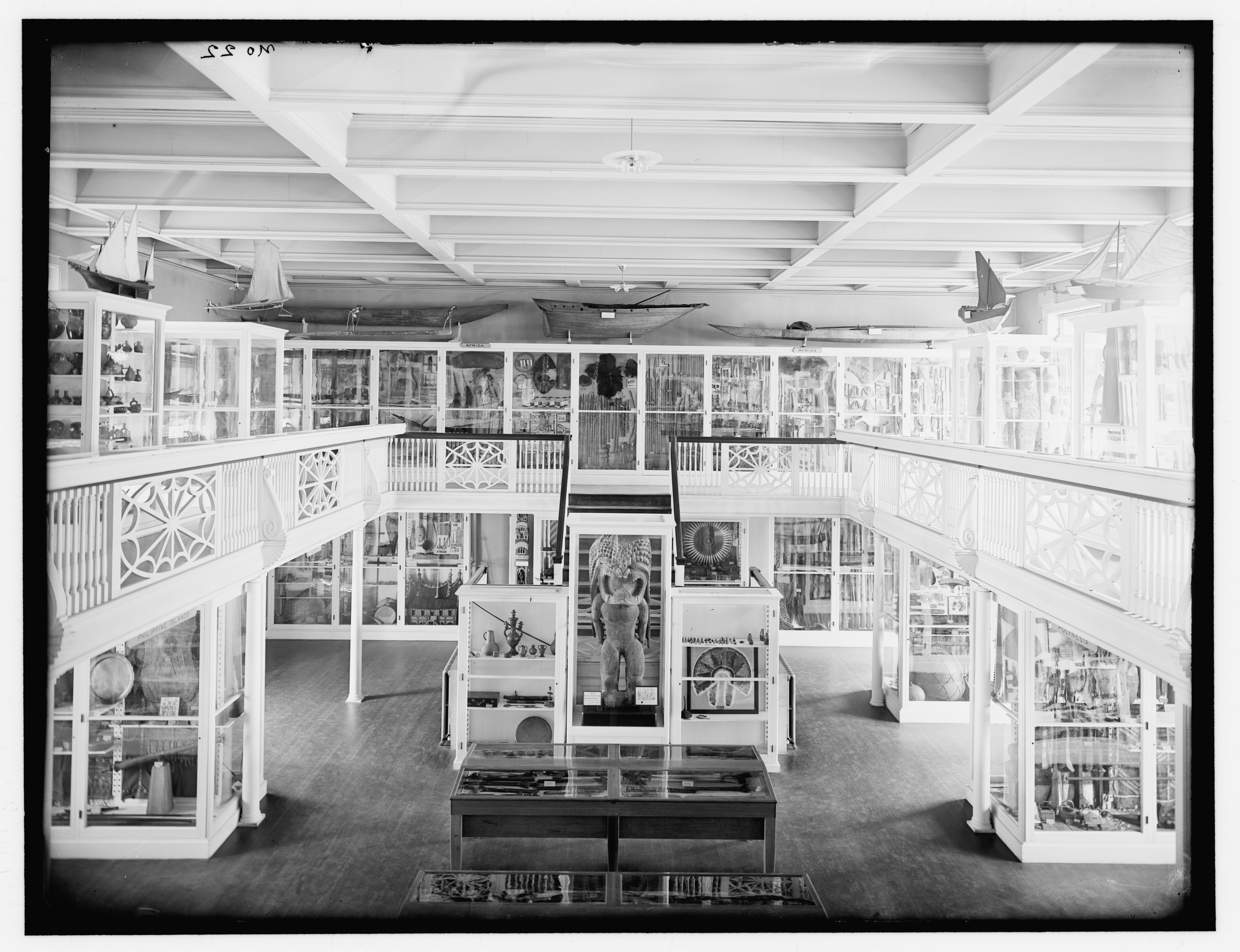
Peabody Museum, Salem, Massachusetts, circa 1910s

Peabody Museum Marine Room, circa 1920

Peabody Museum Marine Room, circa 1920

Peabody Museum half hulls built between 1809-1870 of Salem ships

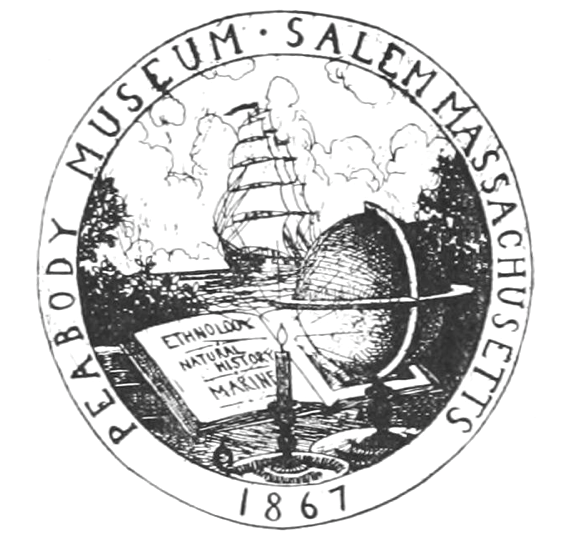
Logo, 1921
