= Essex County Natural History Society =

The Essex County Natural History Society (1833–1848) in Salem, Massachusetts, United States, was formed "for the purpose of promoting the science of natural history." It endeavored "to form a complete collection of natural productions, curiosities. &c, particularly of this county; and, to form a library of standard books on the natural sciences." The society incorporated in 1836; Andrew Nichols, William Oakes, and William Prescott served as signatories. Other members included Samuel B. Buttrick, Samuel P. Fowler, John M. Ives, John C. Lee, George Osgood, Charles G. Page, Gardner B. Perry, George Dean Phippen, William P. Richardson, John Lewis Russell, Henry Wheatland. By 1836 some 100 members belonged to the society. In Salem its "cabinets and library were first deposited in Essex Place, then in Franklin Building, then in Chase's Building, Washington Street, and finally removed to Pickman Place, in 1842." In 1848 the society merged with the Essex Historical Society to form the Essex Institute.

== See also ==
- Essex Institute (1848–1992), successor to the Natural History Society
