= Solomon Willard =

American architect (1783–1861)

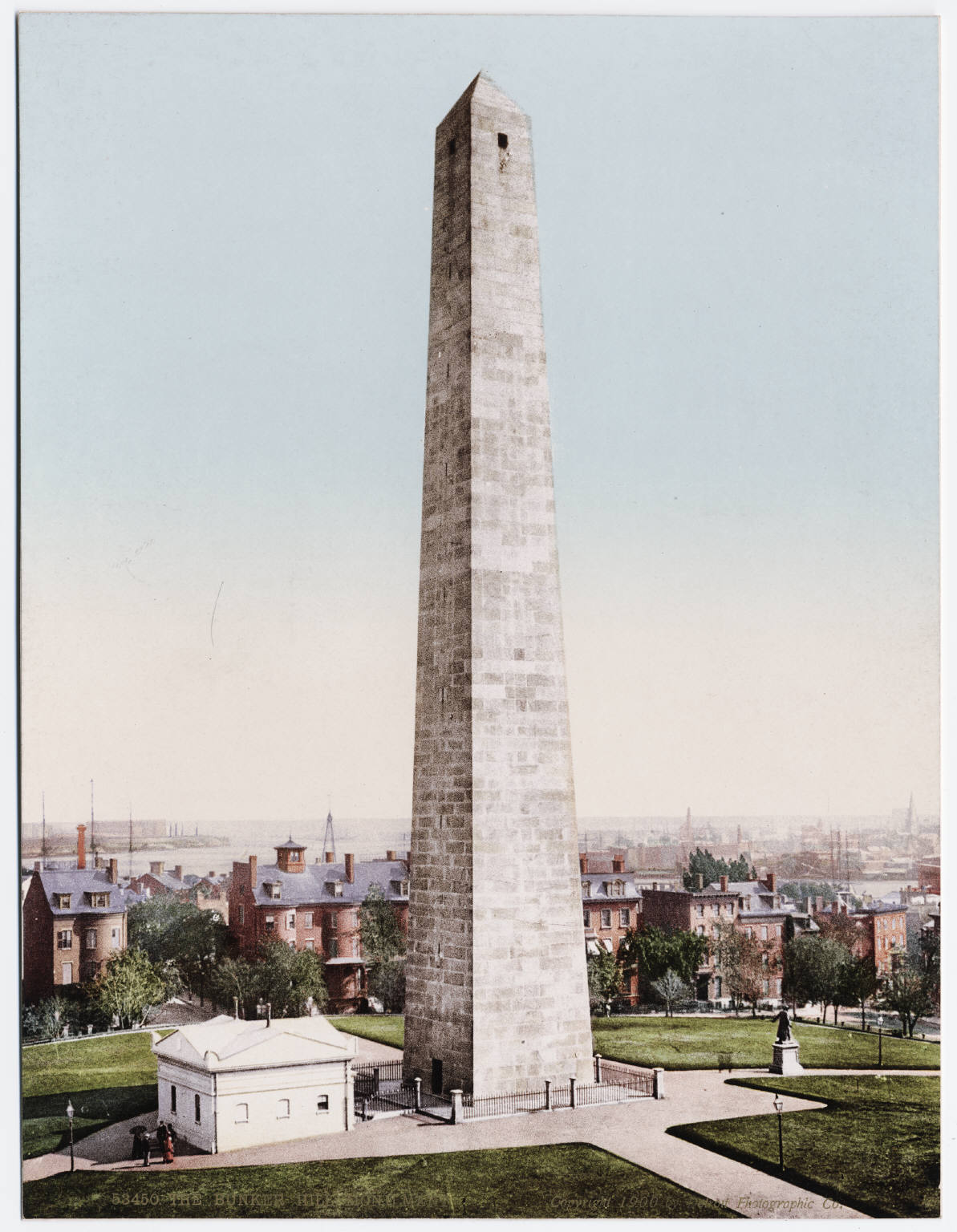
- Detroit Photographic Company image of Bunker Hill Monument
- Born: June 26, 1783; Petersham, Massachusetts
- Died: February 27, 1861 (aged 77); Quincy, Massachusetts
- Known for: Carpenter, Stone carving, Architect

Solomon Willard (June 26, 1783 – February 27, 1861) was a carver and builder in Massachusetts who is remembered primarily for designing and overseeing the Bunker Hill Monument, the first monumental obelisk erected in the United States.

== Background ==
Willard was born in Petersham, Massachusetts, and trained as a carpenter with his father, a farmer who did carpentry in the winters. He went to Boston in 1804, working during the day and reading books of architecture and drawing in the evenings.

== Career ==
His handiness as a carver improved rapidly and he was employed for carved architectural details for many important late Federal and Greek Revival buildings in Boston, such as the Ionic and Corinthian capitals for the steeple of Park Street Church, built in 1810. In the same year he carved the eagle for the pediment of the new Custom House.

In 1818 he made a model of the capitol at Washington for Charles Bulfinch, who was then engaged on the Massachusetts State House, and later did several further works of this sort, among which were models of the Pantheon and the Parthenon for Edward Everett. From wood carving he turned to stone carving, and in 1820 was engaged on the Ionic capitals and other stonework of the Cathedral Church of St. Paul, Boston, the first example of Greek Revival architecture in Boston. By 1821 Willard had become so successful that he gave classes in architecture and drawing in his studio near St. Paul's, where the sculptor Horatio Greenough was a pupil. Willard added ship figureheads to his craft, from 1823.

=== Bunker Hill Monument ===
On November 2, 1825, Willard was chosen architect and superintendent of Bunker Hill Monument, his design having been accepted by the building committee in the following year. Construction began in 1827. Willard discovered satisfactory granite quarries for the stone at Quincy, and the granite for the monument came from there. Willard also invented the machinery to cut and handle the slabs of stone in what became known as the Bunker Hill Quarry, which evolved into a major industry for the town. To get the cut slabs to a wharf on the Neponset River, a distance of two and three-quarters miles, the first commercial railway in the United States was built—the Granite Railway—over which, on the morning of October 7, 1826, the first horse-drawn cars passed, under the direction of a young engineer by the name of Gridley Bryant.

Willard's work on the Bunker Hill Monument was succinctly recorded in 1849, by Amos Lawrence, secretary of the Building Committee, who wrote in the flyleaf of the committee's records: "Solomon Willard walked three hundred miles to examine granite quarries (Hallowell, Maine, and other places), gave a thousand dollars to the Monument Association, and worked like a dog for the association for years for merely his necessary expenses (which were very small), and is now at work at Quincy" (History 1926).

He was engaged in this work for seventeen years, being frequently interrupted by want of funds and by disagreements in the committee in charge, but on July 23, 1842, the top stone of the monument was laid, and on the anniversary of the battle in 1843 its completion was celebrated in the presence of the president of the United States, his cabinet, and a large concourse of citizens from every part of the United States.

=== Other works ===
In Framingham, Massachusetts, Willard's First Baptist Church, Framingham of 1826 still stands, now the oldest building in the town. The Norfolk County Courthouse in Dedham, Massachusetts, is also his work. In the same year he was also architect of Divinity Hall, Harvard Divinity School with Thomas Sumner. Willard also designed the Greek Revival Framingham Town Hall. The Gothic Revival Church of St. John the Evangelist on Bowdoin Street, Boston, dated to 1831, is also probably his design.

He is credited with designing some of the first hot-air central heating in an American building. In 1829 his recent pupil, the brilliant young architect Isaiah Rogers, designed the innovative Tremont House in Boston. This was the first American hotel to have indoor plumbing and it became the prototype of a modern, first-class American hotel.

He also supervised construction of the Captain Nathan Hale Monument in Coventry, Connecticut, which is a 45-foot obelisk.

== Other ==
Willard died in Quincy, Massachusetts. In 1865, William W. Wheildon wrote a Memoir of Solomon Willard, Architect and Superintendent of the Bunker Hill Monument published by the Monument Association (Boston), which is the primary source for his biographers.

== Images ==
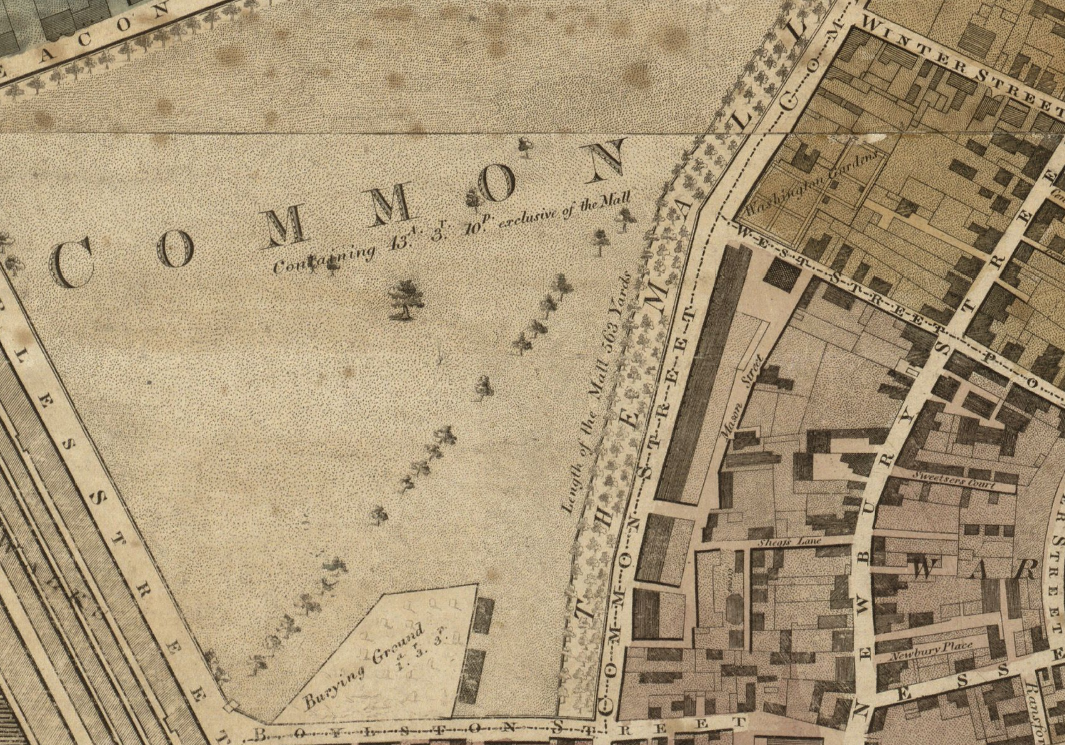
Detail of 1814 map Mason Street, Boston, where Willard kept his studio ca.1813

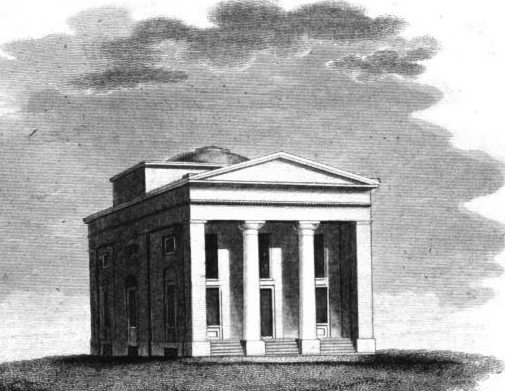
U.S. Branch Bank, no.32 State Street, Boston; designed by Willard ca.1817

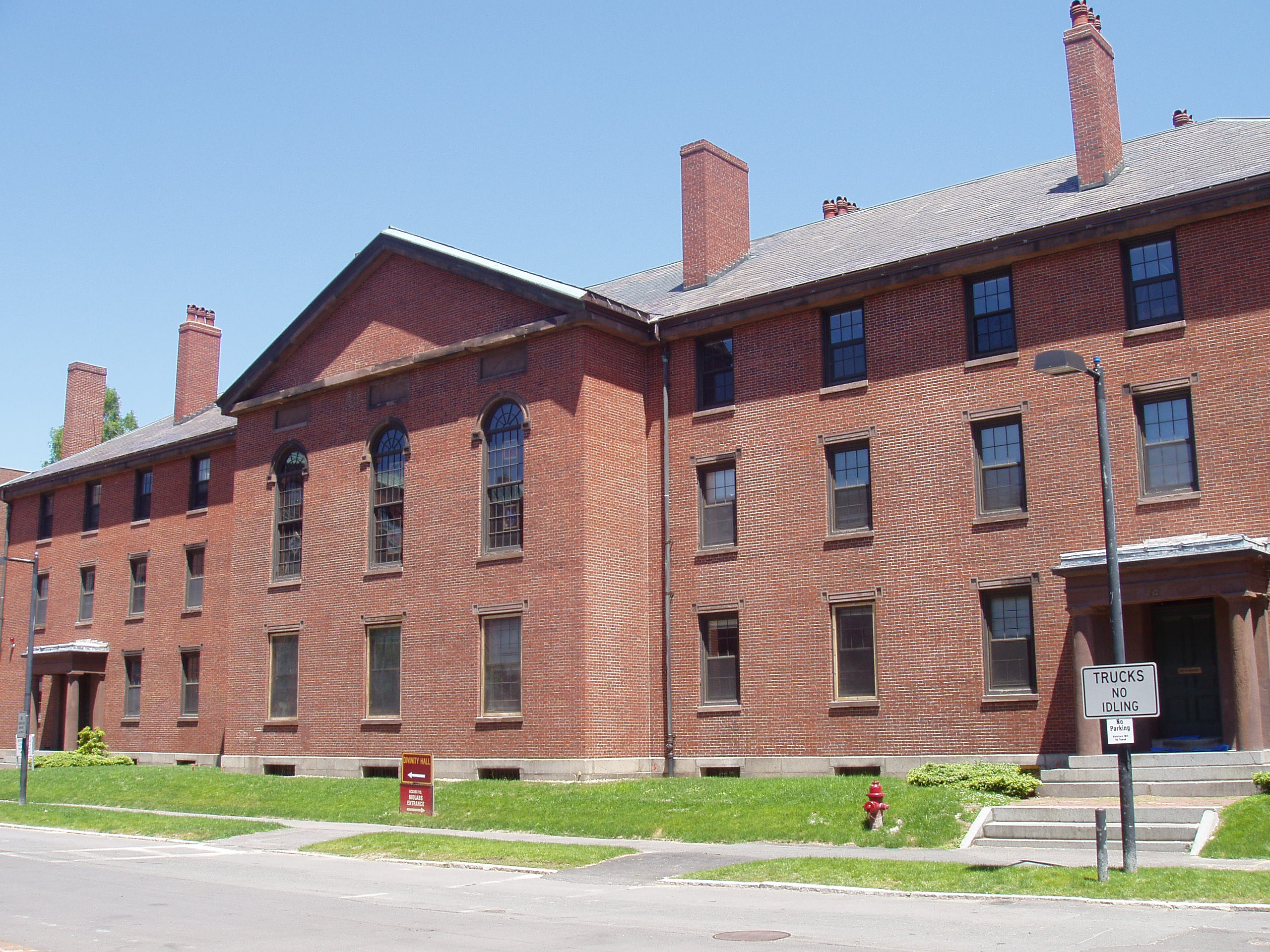
Divinity Hall, Harvard Divinity School, view from Divinity Avenue, Cambridge, Massachusetts

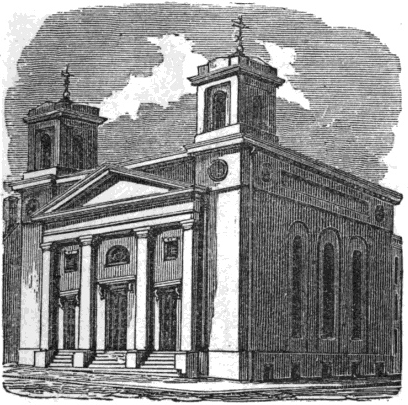
Universalist Church, Bulfinch Street, Boston, designed by Willard, 1822

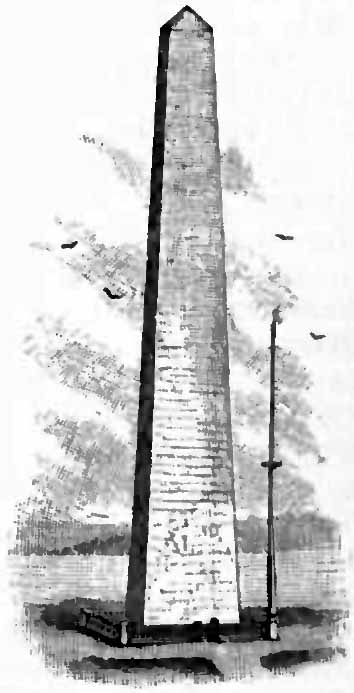
An 1889 drawing of the Bunker Hill Monument

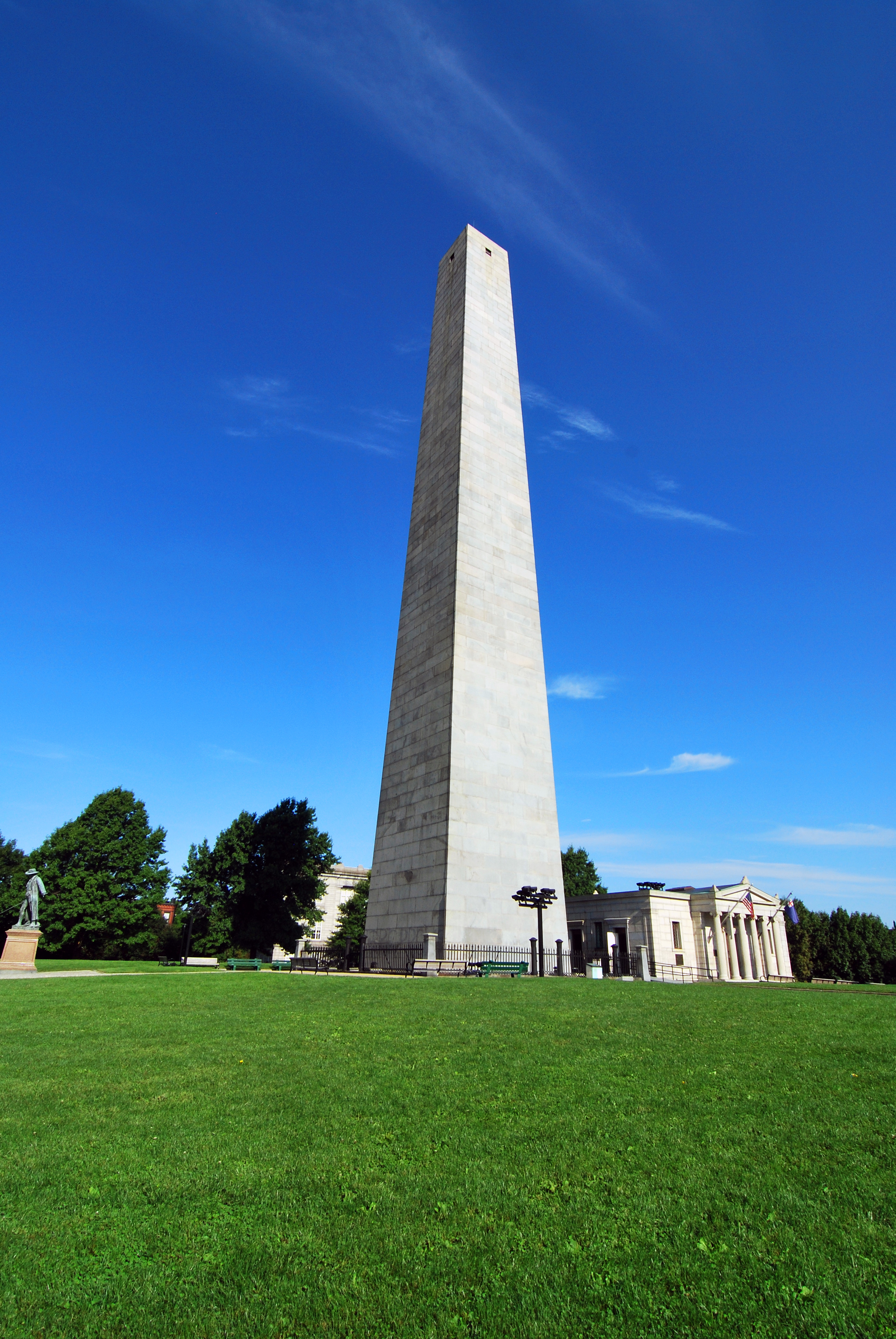
Bunker Hill Monument

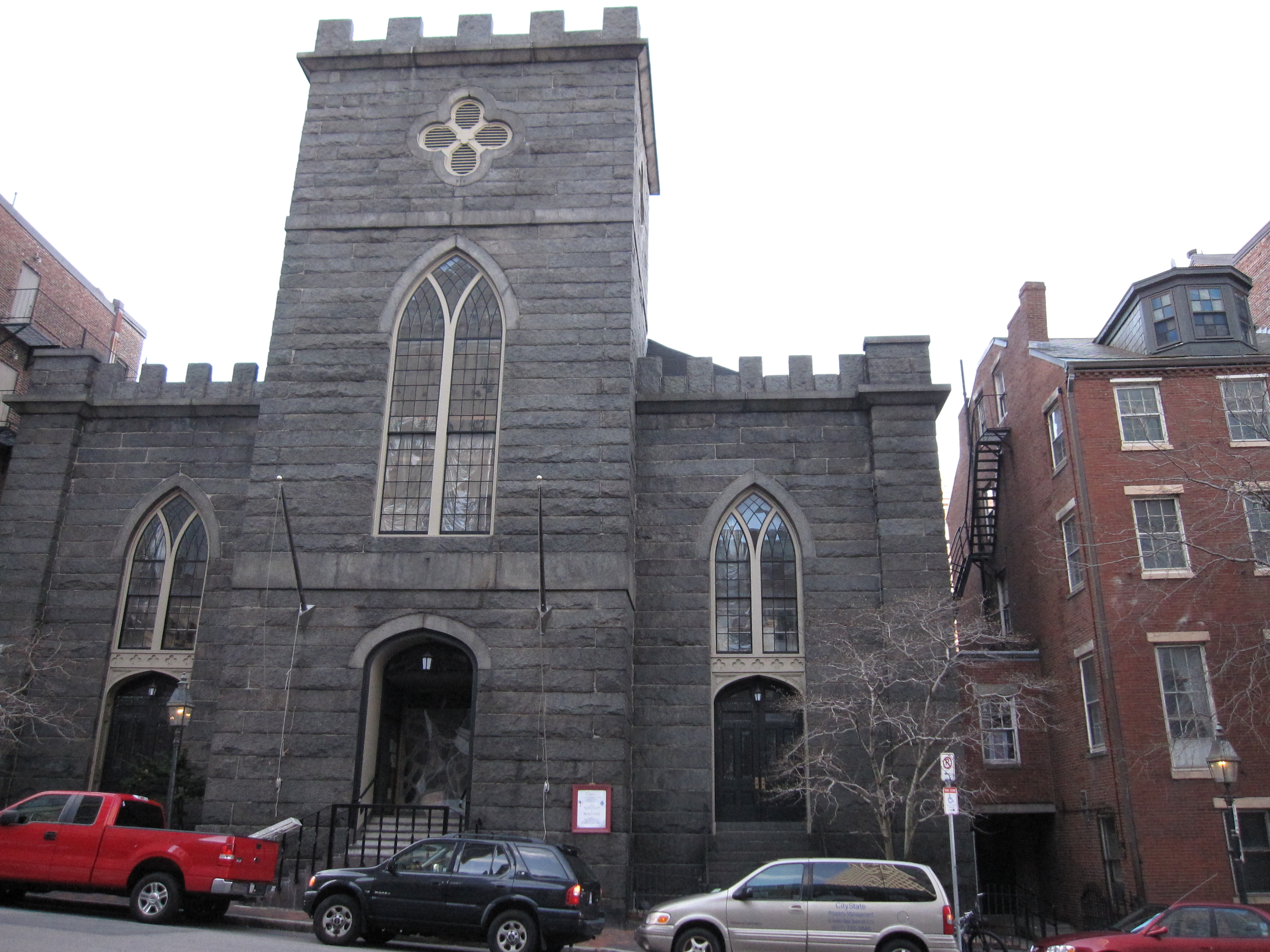
Church of St. John the Evangelist, Bowdoin Street, Boston, built 1831 (photo 2010)

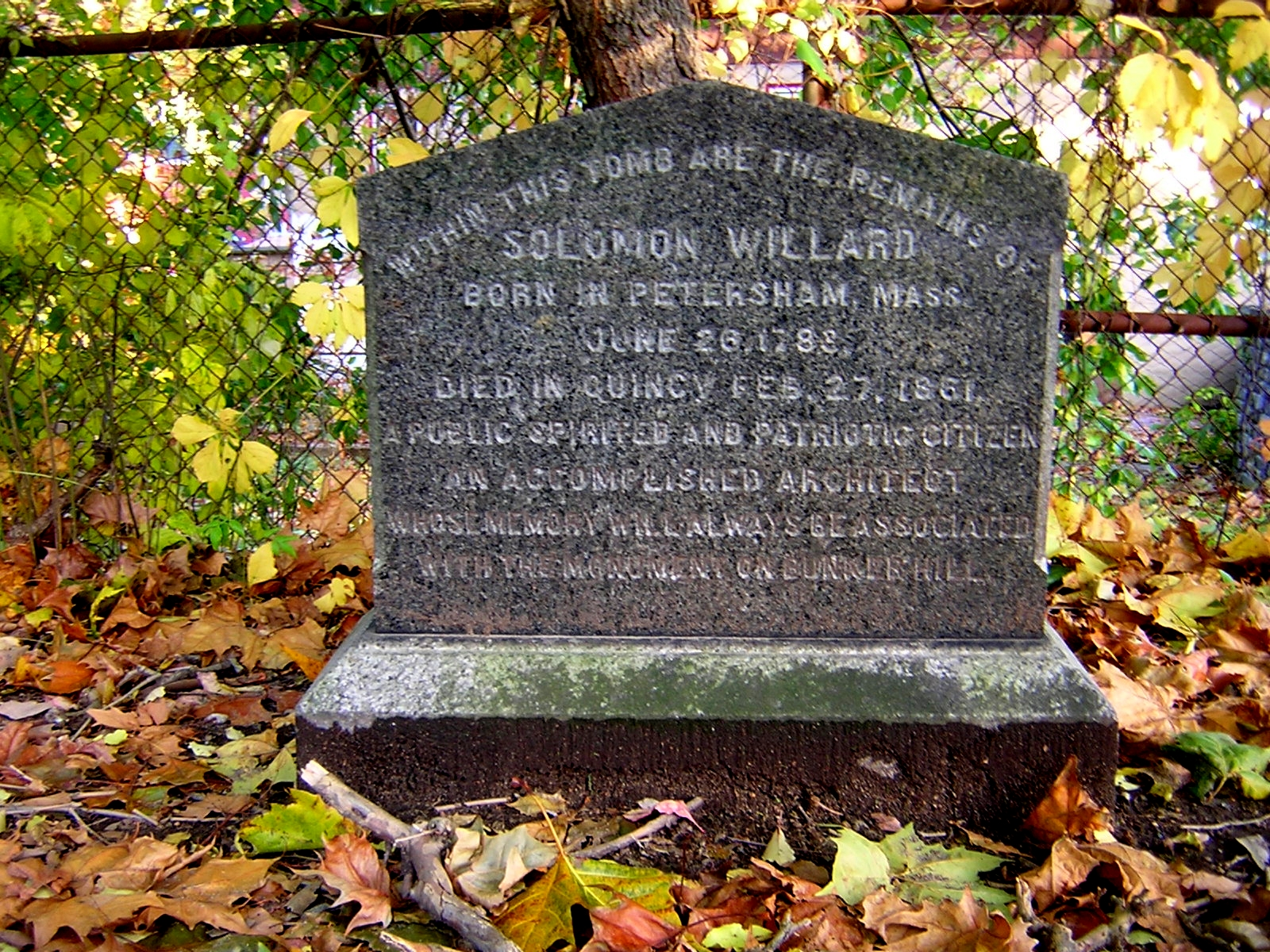
Willard grave, Hall Place Cemetery, 61 Crescent Street, Quincy, MA

== Family ==
Solomon Willard was a 3rd great-grandson (6th generation descendant) of the Massachusetts colonist Simon Willard (1605–1676). Solomon was also a 1st cousin of the American academician Sidney Willard (1780–1856), a son of Joseph Willard (1738–1804), clergyman and President of Harvard from 1781 through 1804.
