= The Boston Miscellany =

Defunct American fashion and literary magazines

The Boston Miscellany of Literature and Fashion
- Editor: Nathan Hale, Jr.
- Editor: Henry Theodore Tuckerman
- Frequency: Monthly
- Founded: January 1, 1842
- Final issue: February 1, 1843
- Based in: Boston, Massachusetts
- Language: English
- OCLC: 1536867

The Boston Miscellany of Literature and Fashion was a monthly literary and fashion magazine published in Boston, Massachusetts from 1842 to 1843. It also published book reviews and music.

The initial issue of The Boston Miscellany was published in January 1842, with Nathan Hale, Jr. (son of the journalist Nathan Hale) as its editor. Henry Theodore Tuckerman served as editor in 1843. The magazine was published by Bradbury, Soden & Co. It ceased publication after the 14th issue in February 1843.

Contributors to the magazine included John Neal, Henry David Thoreau, Edward Everett, Nathaniel Hawthorne, Edward Everett Hale, James Russell Lowell, Edgar Allan Poe, and Nathaniel Parker Willis. Sarah Hale, Nathan Hale's wife, translated tales from German into English that were published in the magazine.
