= Thomas Waldron Sumner =

Thomas Waldron Sumner (1768–1849) was an architect and government representative in Boston, Massachusetts, in the early 19th century. He designed East India Marine Hall and the Independent Congregational Church in Salem; and the South Congregational Society church in Boston. He was also involved with the Exchange Coffee House, Boston.

In Boston he lived on Cambridge Street and Chamber Street, and later moved to Brookline. He belonged to the Boston Associated Housewrights Society and the Massachusetts Charitable Mechanick Association. Sumner married Elizabeth Hubbard (1770–1839); children included Caroline Sumner (born 1796) and Thomas Hubbard Sumner. His parents were engineer James Sumner (1740–1814) and Alice Waldron (died 1773). The artist John Christian Rauschner created portraits of Sumner and his wife.

== Images ==
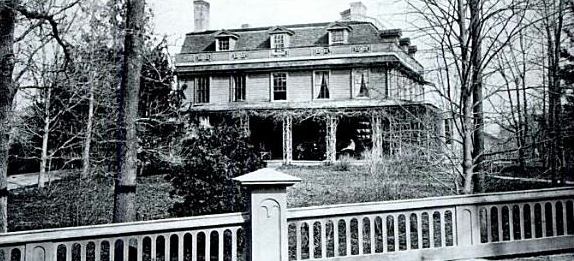
Sumner's home in Brookline, Mass. (photo Historic New England)

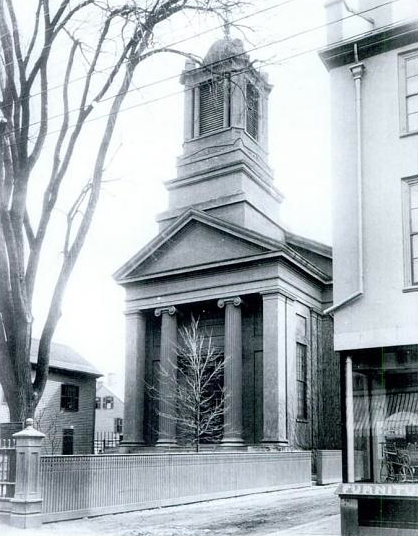
Independent Congregational Church, Salem; built in 1825 (photo 1890s). Designed by Sumner.

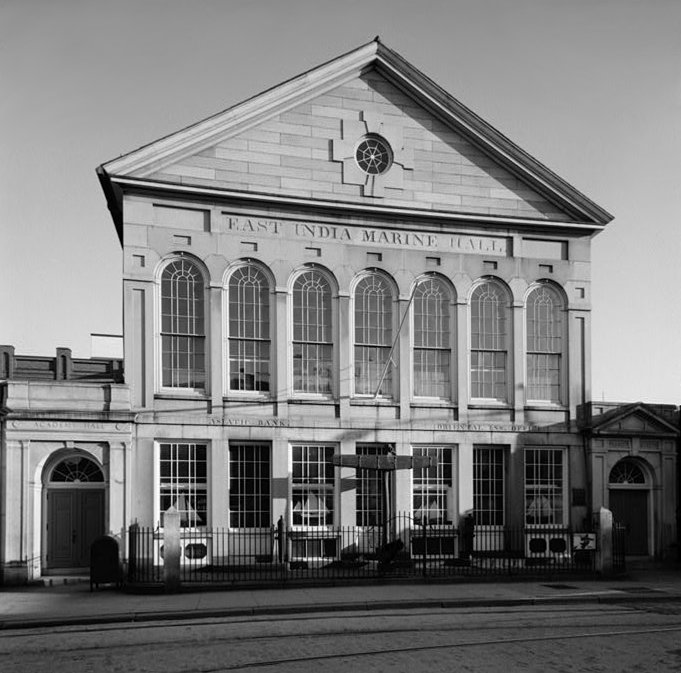
East India Marine Hall, Salem; built 1825. Designed by Sumner.

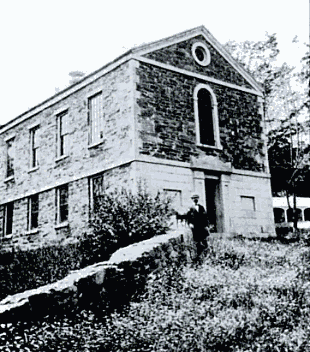
Pierce Hall, Brookline, Mass., built 1825. Designed by Sumner (photo Boston Public Library)

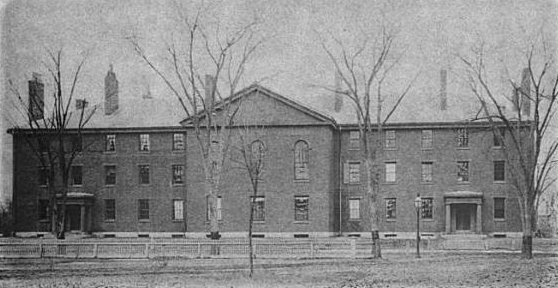
Divinity Hall, Harvard Divinity School, Cambridge, Mass.; built 1826. Designed by Sumner and Solomon Willard.

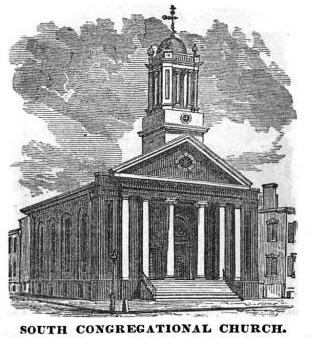
South Congregational Church, Boston; built in 1828. Designed by Sumner.
