= Essex Institute =

Coordinates: 42°31′21.05″N 70°53′29.15″W

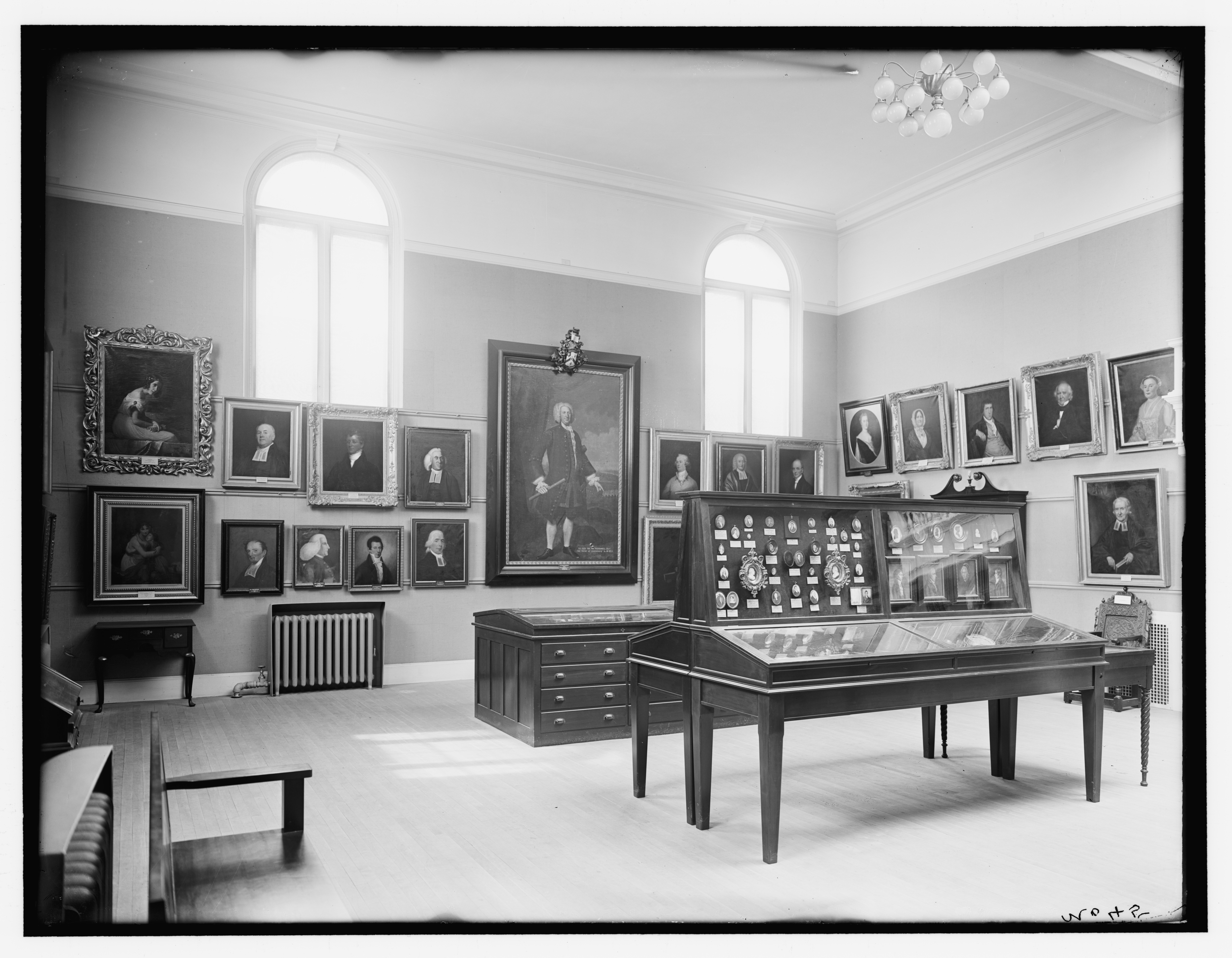
Essex Institute, Salem, Massachusetts, circa 1900-1910

The Essex Institute (1848–1992) in Salem, Massachusetts, was "a literary, historical and scientific society." It maintained a museum, library, historic houses; arranged educational programs; and issued numerous scholarly publications. In 1992 the institute merged with the Peabody Museum of Salem to form the Peabody Essex Museum.

On December 8, 2017, Dan L. Monroe, PEM’s Rose-Marie and Eijk van Otterloo Director and CEO, issued a statement announcing that the 42,000 linear feet of historical documents will be permanently relocated to Rowley, MA to allow Plummer Hall and Daland House, the two historic buildings which had housed the Phillips Library, to undergo critically needed preservation and renovation work.

== History ==
The Essex Institute was "formed by the union of the Essex Historical Society and the Essex County Natural History Society." Daniel Appleton White, the former Judge of Probate for Essex County, was appointed in 1848 as the first president of the institute until his death in 1861. Around 1879 the institute housed its "scientific collections" in Salem's East India Marine Hall and its library in Plummer Hall. According to an 1880 travel guide, "its objects are general and varied. Perhaps the most important is that of local historical discoveries and the preservation of everything relating to Essex County history."

In addition to operating a library and museum, the institute arranged educational programs. In the 1880s, for example: "1. Every winter season lectures are given to an almost unlimited extent. Besides a regular course on general subjects, several courses are given on special subjects — Literature, History, Languages, Travel, the Sciences — and various papers are read before the regular meetings. 2. A regular course of musical entertainments is given every season, besides which there are several miscellaneous concerts. 3. Art exhibitions are given once or twice each year, at which are exhibited paintings, statuary, decorations, fancy work and the like by Essex county people. Also, exhibitions of horticulture and agriculture. 4. During the summer season a half dozen "field meetings" are held in different parts of the county. At these meetings addresses are made on the local history of the place visited, and on its flora and geology. In addition, it is customary to have one or more distinguished scientists or historians to speak on a specially assigned topic."

By the 1930s the institute owned "two fine Samuel McIntire houses in Salem - the Peirce-Nichols House, built in 1782, and the Gardner-Pingree House, built in 1804, both ... open to the public."

== Images ==
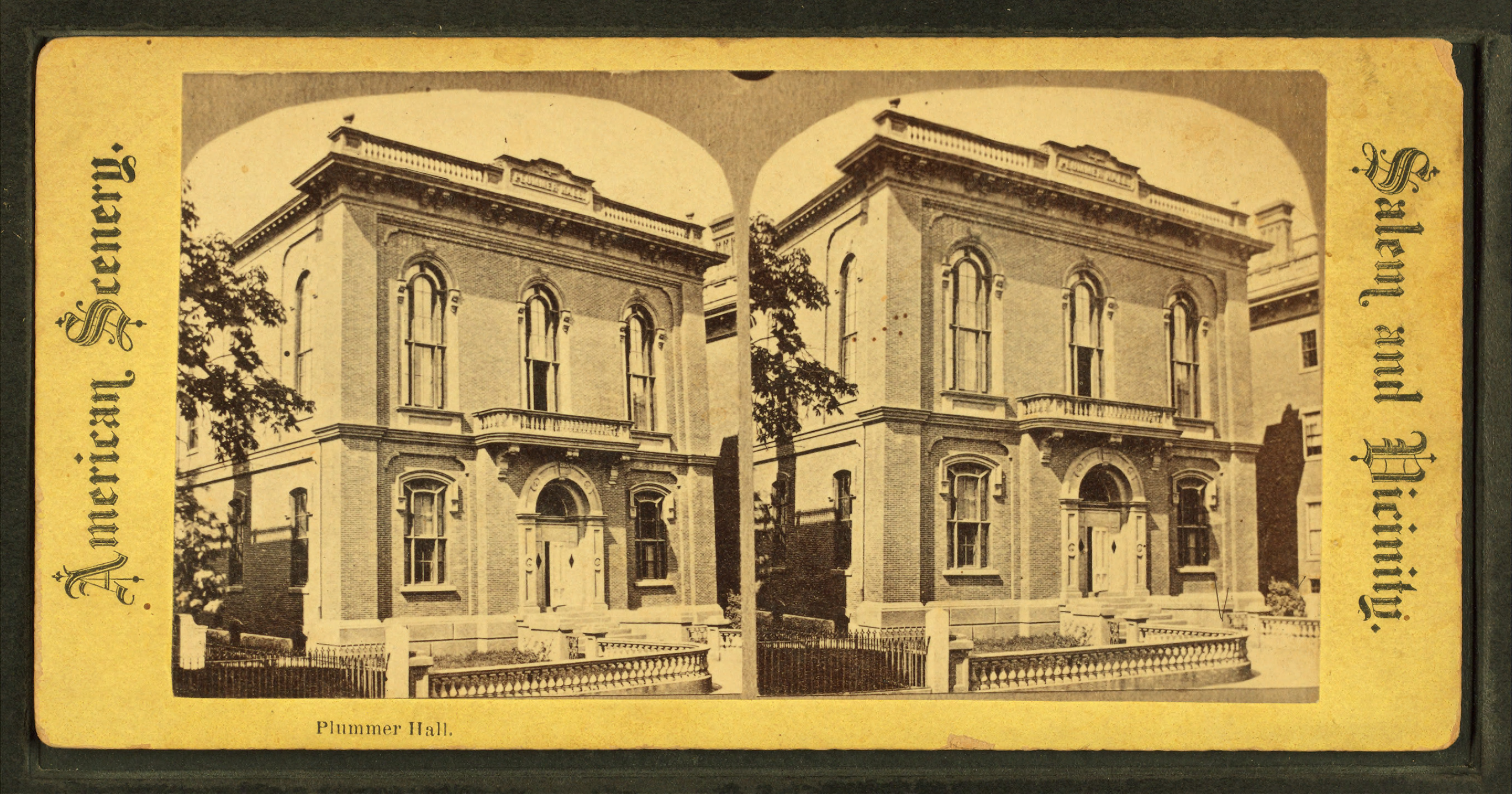
Plummer Hall, 19th century

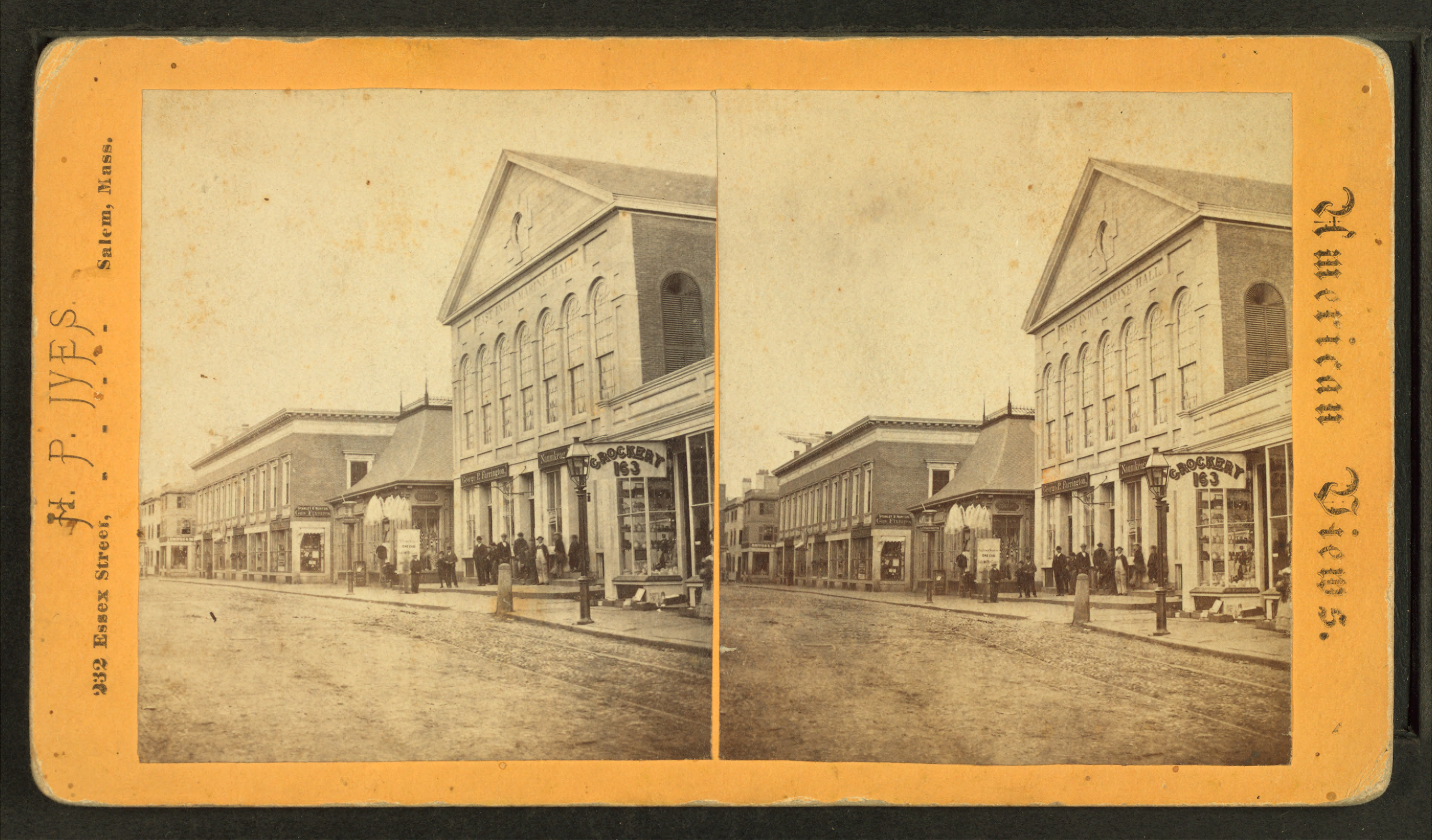
East India Marine Hall, 19th century

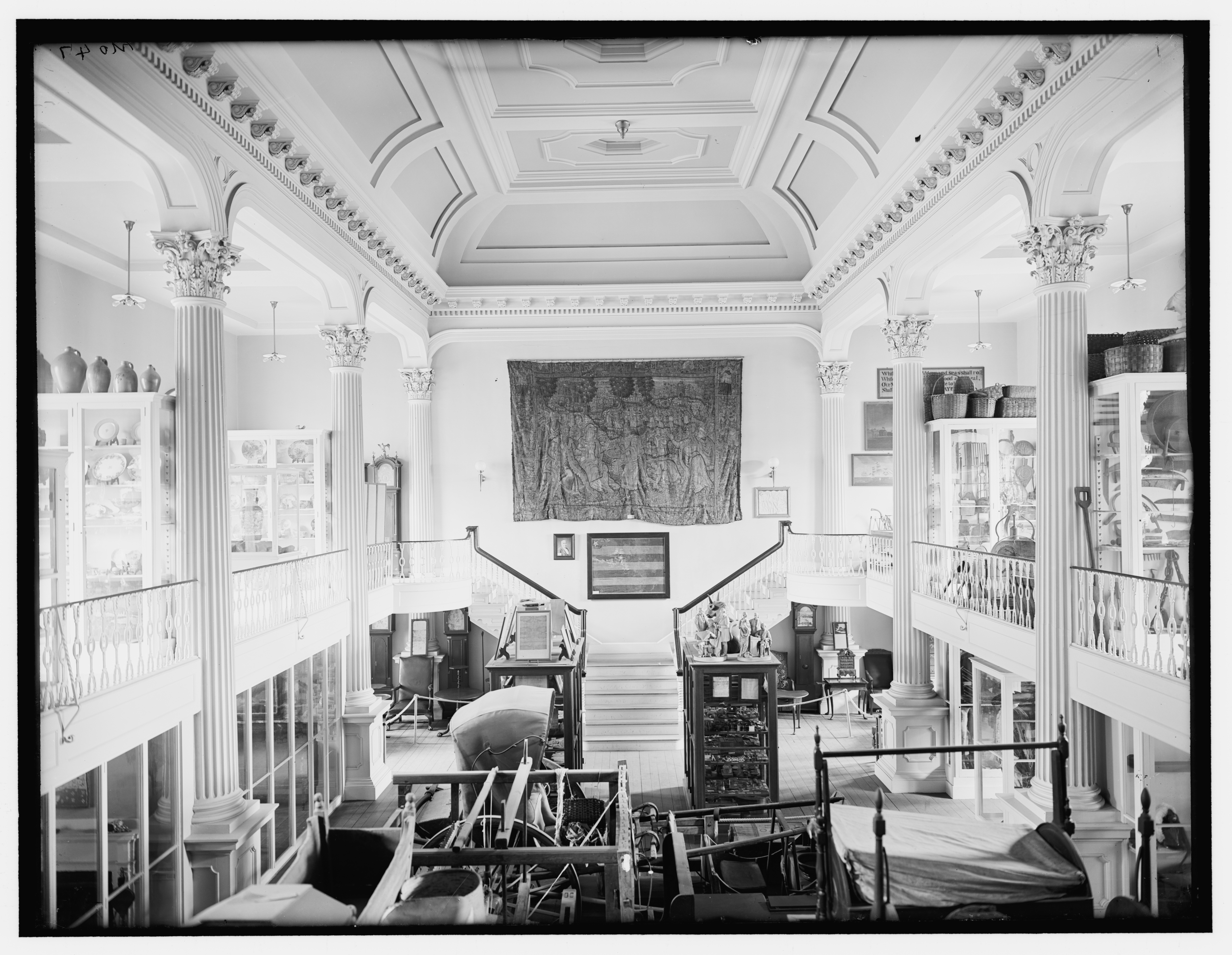
Essex Institute, c. 1900-1910

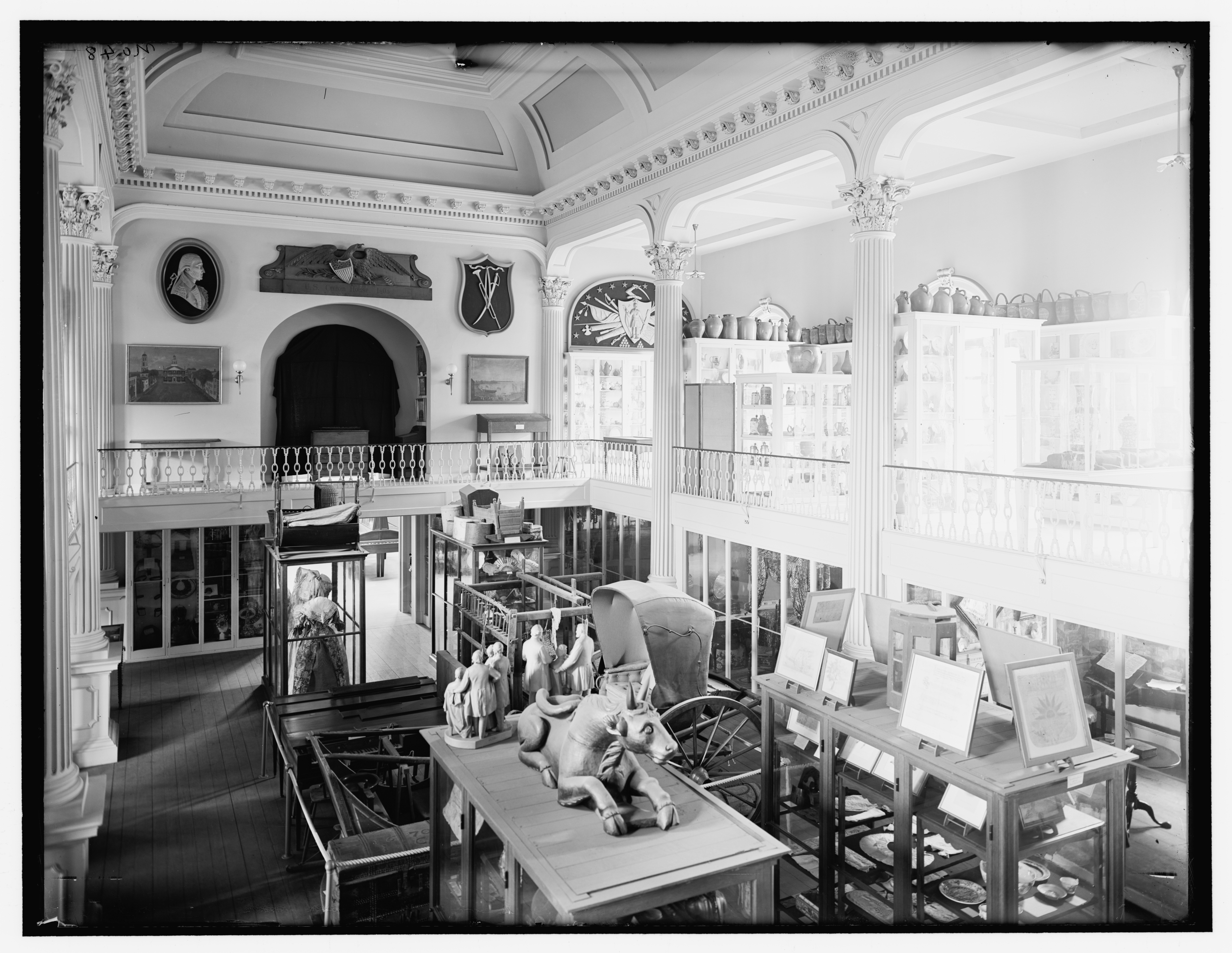
Essex Institute, c. 1900-1910

== See also ==
- Peabody Essex Museum, successor to the Essex Institute (1992)
- List of historical societies in Massachusetts
