= List of historic houses in Massachusetts =

This is a list of historic houses in Massachusetts.

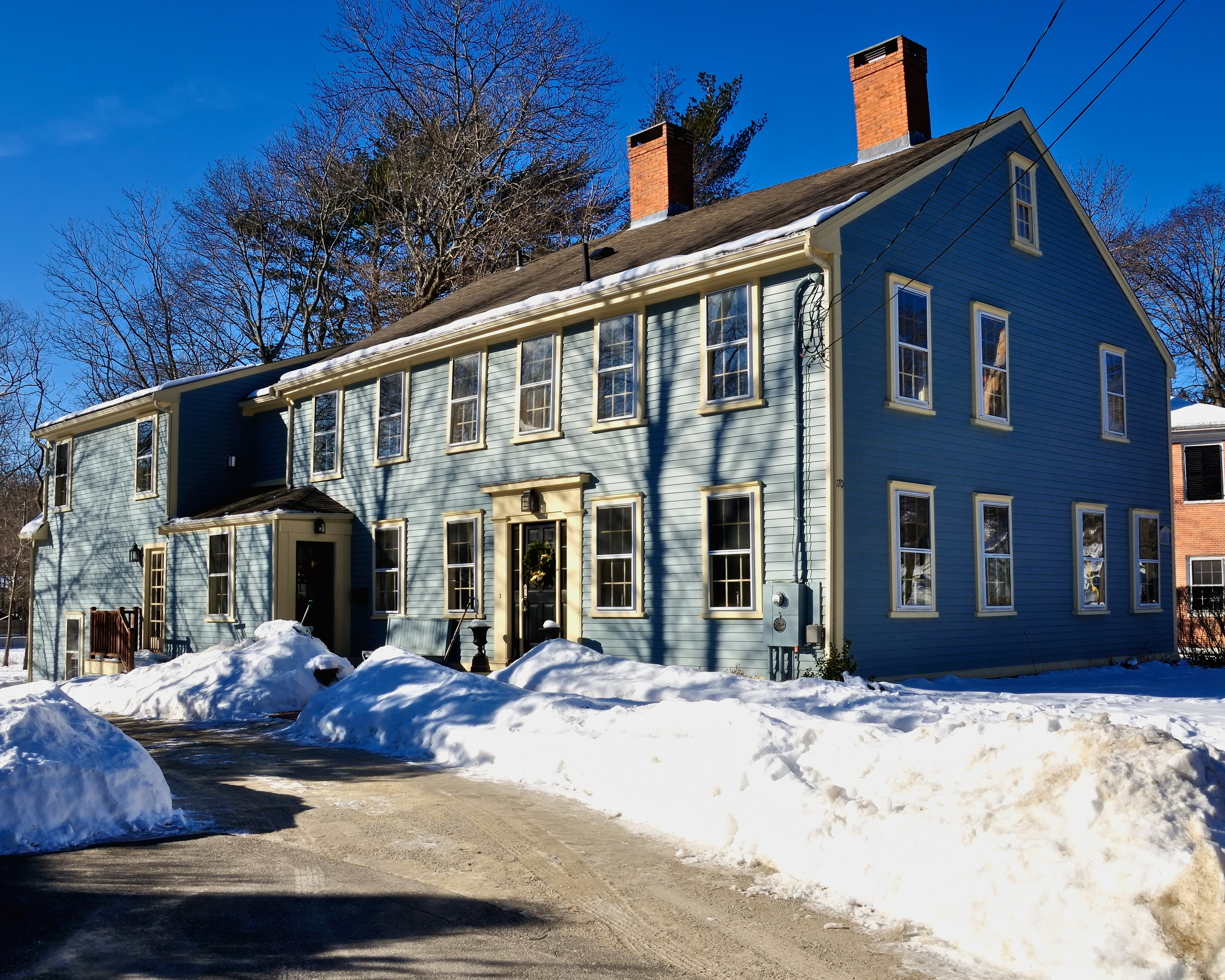
Samuel Lincoln House, Hingham, built on land purchased 1649 by Samuel Lincoln, ancestor of President Abraham Lincoln

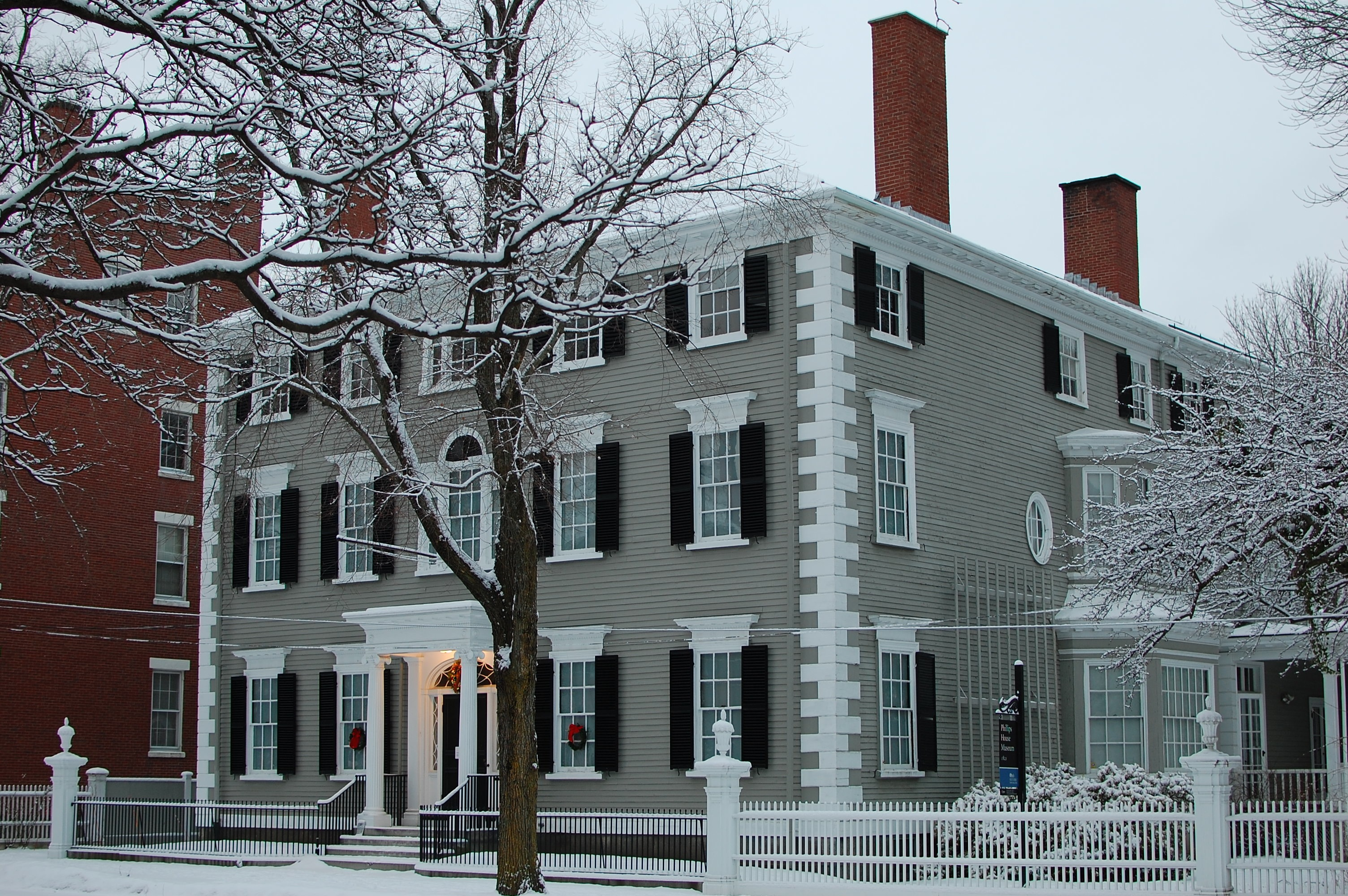
Stephen Phillips House is over 200 years old and is located in the Chestnut Street District, in Salem, Massachusetts, United States. It was designed by Samuel McIntyre. It is now owned and operated as a historic house museum by Historic New England and is open for public tours. The house was added to the National Register of Historic Places in 1983.

== Western Massachusetts ==
=== Berkshire County ===
- Lenox
  - The Mount (Lenox) – author Edith Wharton's estate; 1902
  - Ventfort Hall (Lenox) – Jacobean style mansion, built 1893 – George & Sarah Morgan (sister of J.P. Morgan)
  - Frelinghuysen Morris House and Studio – home of American Abstract Artists George L.K. Morris and Suzy Frelinghuysen; 1930–1941
- Pittsfield
  - Arrowhead (Pittsfield) – home of author Herman Melville; built 1780
- Stockbridge
  - Chesterwood (Stockbridge) – sculptor Daniel Chester French's home and studio; 1920s
  - Merwin House (Stockbridge) – Federal-style house built c. 1825
  - The Mission House (Stockbridge) – the first missionary to the Mohegan Indians in Stockbridge; built in 1739
  - Naumkeag (Stockbridge) – 44 room, Shingle-style country house designed by Stanford White; 1885
- Elsewhere
  - Anthony House (Adams) – birthplace of Susan B. Anthony
  - Colonel John Ashley House (Sheffield) – built c. 1735
  - Bidwell House Museum (Monterey) – built 1750
  - The Folly (Williamstown) – designed by Ulrich Franzen, 1966
  - Santarella (Tyringham) – home of sculptor Henry Hudson Kitson

=== Franklin County ===
- Deerfield
  - Sheldon–Hawks House (Deerfield) – built in 1743
- Greenfield
  - Leavitt–Hovey House (Greenfield) – built in 1799 by architect Asher Benjamin for judge Jonathan Leavitt

=== Hampden County ===
- Agawam
  - Capt. Charles Leonard House, built in 1805, designed by Asher Benjamin
  - Purchase-Ferre House, built in 1764, owned by the Ferre family since 1799
  - Thomas and Esther Smith House, built in 1757, example of vernacular Georgian architecture
- Chicopee
  - Edward Bellamy House, built in 1852, home of Utopian writer Edward Bellamy
  - Thomas D. Page House, c. 1875, used as freemason lodge, 1909–2012
- East Longmeadow
  - Elijah Burt House, c. 1720–1740, station of Underground Railroad
  - Swetland-Pease House, c. 1793
- Granville
  - John and Ruth Rose House, built in 1742
- Hampden
  - Laughing Brook Wildlife Sanctuary (Hampden) – home of author Thornton Burgess
  - Captain John Porter House, built in 1771 in Agawam
  - Thornton W. Burgess House, c. 1780–1784
- Holyoke
  - Wistariahurst built in 1868 for William Skinner
- Monson
  - Jacob Thompson House, c. 1811–1813, rare example of Federal style with brick ends
  - William Norcross House, c. 1785, example of late Georgian architecture
- Southwick
  - Laflin-Phelps Homestead, c. 1808–1821, owned by the Phelps family since 1865
- Springfield, Massachusetts
  - Mills-Stebbins Villa, built 1849–1851, considered architect Henry Sykes's "best work" in the Italianate style
- Westfield
  - Joseph Dewey House, c. 1735
  - Octagon House, c. 1858–1864
- West Springfield
  - Josiah Day House, built in 1754, oldest known brick saltbox

=== Hampshire County ===
- Amherst
  - Dickinson Homestead (Amherst) – home of Emily Dickinson
  - Strong House, c. 1744, home of the Amherst Historical Society
- Cummington
  - William Cullen Bryant Homestead (Cummington) – home of William Cullen Bryant
- Hadley
  - Porter–Phelps–Huntington House (Hadley) – built between 1752 and 1799 and home of several generations of important local figures, including diarist Elizabeth Porter Phelps and bishop Frederic Dan Huntington
  - Samuel Porter House, 1713
- Northampton
  - Historic Northampton, a museum of local history in the heart of the Connecticut River Valley of western Massachusetts. Its collection of approximately 50,000 objects and three historic buildings is the repository of Northampton and Connecticut Valley history from the pre-contact era to the present. Historic Northampton constitutes a campus of three contiguous historic houses, all on their original sites. The grounds themselves are part of an original Northampton homelot, laid out in 1654.
    - Isaac Damon House (1813), built by architect Isaac Damon, contains Historic Northampton's administrative offices and a Federal era parlor featuring Damon family furnishings and period artifacts. A modern structure, added in 1987, houses the museum and exhibition area. It features changing exhibits and a permanent installation, A Place Called Paradise: The Making of Northampton, Massachusetts, chronicling Northampton history.
    - Parsons House (1730) affords an overview of Colonial domestic architecture with its interior walls exposed to reveal evolving structural and decorative changes over more than two and a half centuries.
    - Shepherd House (1796) contains artifacts and furnishings from many generations, including exotic souvenirs from the turn-of-the-century travels of Thomas and Edith Shepherd, and reflects one family's changing tastes and values.
    - Shepherd Barn contains exhibits of antique farm implements, vehicles and a working blacksmith shop.

== Central Massachusetts ==
=== Worcester County ===
- Auburn
  - Joseph Stone House – Central Chimney Cape house built c. 1729 35 Stone Street, Auburn.
  - Thaddeus Chapin House on Elmwood Street – Federal-style house built on west side of Pakachoag Hill in what is now Auburn.
- Grafton
  - Willard House and Clock Museum
- Shrewsbury
  - General Artemas Ward House
  - Rev. Joseph Sumner House, built in 1797
- Worcester
  - Salisbury Mansion – built 1772
  - Judge Timothy Paine House – House is known as The Oaks (1774)
  - Captain Benjamin Flagg House – Central Chimney Cape house built c. 1717, 136 Plantation Street

== Eastern Massachusetts ==
=== Essex County ===
- Amesbury
  - Mary Baker Eddy Historic House (Amesbury) – Mary Baker Eddy associations
  - Macy–Colby House (Amesbury) – built 1654
  - Isaac Morrill House – built 1680
  - John Greenleaf Whittier Home (Amesbury) – home of poet John Greenleaf Whittier
- Andover
  - Amos Blanchard House (Andover) – house museum; late Federal period
  - Russell House (Andover) – c. 1805
- Beverly
  - John Balch House (Beverly) – one of the oldest surviving timber-framed houses in the United States, built c. 1679
  - John Cabot House (Beverly) – one of the first brick structures built in Beverly
  - Exercise Conant House (Beverly) (Son of early Cape Ann settler Roger Conant) (Added on to by Reverend John Chipman

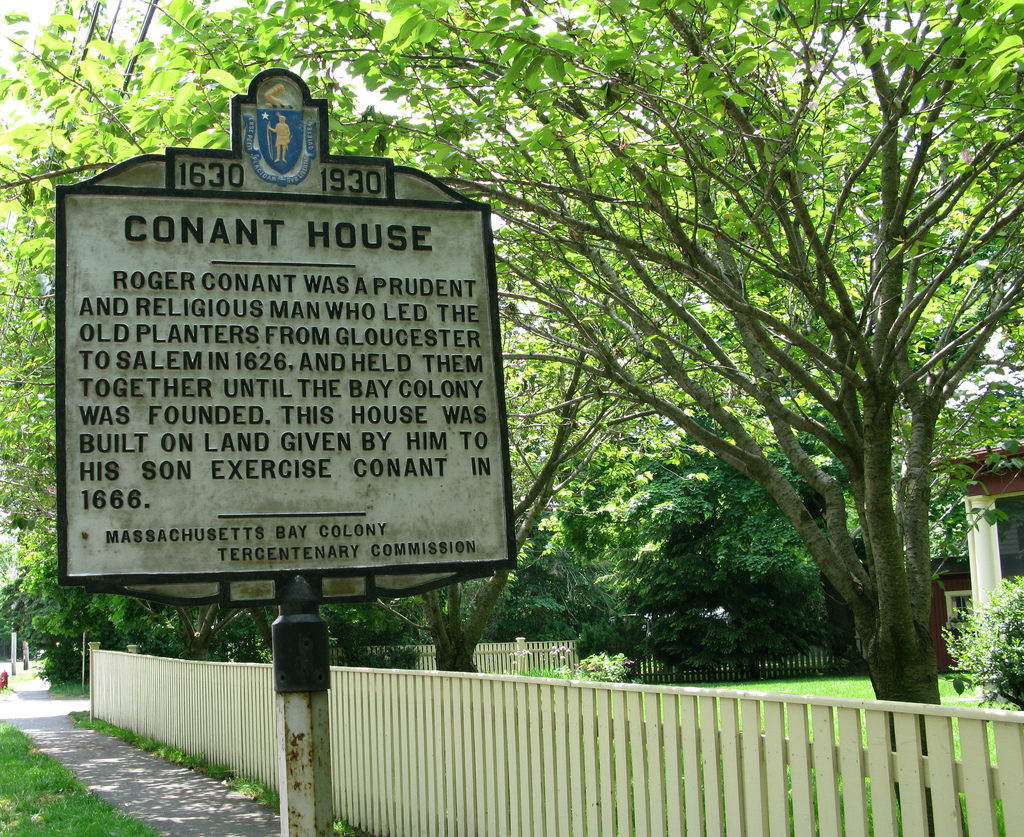
Conant House

  - John Hale House (Beverly) – c. 1695
  - Long Hill (Beverly) – Ellery Sedgwick's home and gardens; 1925
- Danvers
  - Judge Samuel Holten House (Danvers) – c. 1670
  - Rebecca Nurse Homestead (Danvers) – hanged for witchcraft, 1692
  - General Israel Putnam House (Danvers) – c. 1648, birthplace of Gen. Israel Putnam
- Essex
  - Choate House (Essex) – birthplace of Rufus Choate; built c. 1730
  - Coffin House (Essex) – Colonial house; c. 1678
- Gloucester
  - Beauport, Sleeper–McCann House – built in 1907 as a summer house for designer Henry Davis Sleeper
  - Captain Elias Davis House – built in 1804, part of Cape Ann Museum's decorative arts collection.
  - Hammond Castle – home and laboratory of John Hays Hammond Jr.; built 1926–1929
  - Sargent House Museum – built in 1782, home of writer Judith Sargent Murray and pastor John Murray
  - White–Ellery House – built in 1710 for Reverend John White, owned by the Ellery family for 200 years
- Ipswich
  - John Heard House (Ipswich) – Western and Asian cultures in an atmosphere of the China trade years; built 1795
  - John Whipple House (Ipswich) – mid-17th century to the early 18th century
  - Ipswich has hundreds of historic houses, including 57–59 that are classified as First Period.
- Marblehead
  - Ambrose Gale House - built in 1663
  - Jeremiah Lee Mansion - built in 1768
- Newbury and Newburyport
  - Cushing House Museum and Garden (Newburyport) – home of shipowner John Newmarch Cushing
  - Dole–Little House (Newbury) – c. 1715 of older materials
  - Spencer–Peirce–Little Farm (Newbury) – c. 1675–1700
  - The Swett–Ilsley House (Newbury) – c. 1670
- North Andover
  - The Capt. Timothy Johnson House - c. 1708, First Period Colonial home with historical ties to Indian Raids, the Salem Witch Trials, and The Underground Railroad
- Salem
  - Andrew–Safford House was built in 1819
  - Bessie Monroe House was built in 1811
  - Bowker Place located at144–156 Essex Street and built in 1830
  - Crowninshield–Bentley House (Salem) – c. 1727–1730
  - Salem City Hall – Oldest continually run City Hall in America, built in 1837
  - Cotting–Smith Assembly House
  - Derby House built in 1762
  - Francis Cox House built in 1846
  - Gardner–Pingree House (Salem) – 1804–1805
  - Gedney House (Salem) – c. 1665
  - Hamilton Hall – A National Historic Landmark located at 9 Chestnut Street and built in 1805 by Samuel McIntire and added to the National Register of Historic Places in 1970.
  - Hawkes House – c. 1780, 1800
  - House of the Seven Gables (Salem) – house from the Nathaniel Hawthorne novel of the same name
  - John Bertram Mansion located in the McIntyre Historic District, High Style Italianate brick and brownstone mansion built in 1855. When John Bertram died in March 1882, his widow donated their home ( The John Bertram Mansion located at 370 Essex Street ) and this became the Salem Public Library. The Salem Public Library opened its doors on July 8, 1889, and is in the National Register of Historic Places.
  - John Bertram Mansion, built in 1818–19 – Located in the Salem Common Historic District and is a home for the elderly
  - John Tucker Daland House (Salem) – 1851–1852
  - Joseph Fenno House–Woman's Friend Society, 18th Century – Federal architecture
  - Joseph Story House was built in 1811 for U.S. Supreme Court Justice Joseph Story
  - Joshua Ward House was built in 1784
  - Joseph Winn Jr. House c. 1843
  - Narbonne House c. 1675
  - Nathaniel Hawthorne Birthplace (Salem) – birthplace of American novelist Nathaniel Hawthorne; built between 1730 and 1745
  - Nathaniel Bowditch House (Salem) – home of Nathaniel Bowditch (c. 1805)
  - Pedrick Store House c. 1770
  - Peirce–Nichols House located at 80 Federal Street, built in 1782
  - Phillips Library
  - Pickering House (Salem) – c. 1651
  - Ropes Mansion (Salem) – late 1720s
  - Rufus Choate House is located at 14 Lynde Street and was built in 1787
  - Salem Athenaeum
  - Shepard Block is a Greek Revival structure was constructed in 1851 and is located at 298-304 Essex Street
  - Stephen Phillips House is located at 34 Chestnut Street – c. 1806
  - Thomas March Woodbridge House is located at 48 Bridge Street – c. 1809
  - John P. Peabody House at 15 Summer Street – built in 1867
  - Salem Old Town Hall 1816–17, Federal Style building.
  - Quaker Meeting House
  - West Cogswell House is a historic set of row houses located at 5–9 Summer Street and built in 1834
  - William Pike House, 19th Century
  - Witch House (Salem) – c. 1642 – home of Witch Trials Judge Jonathan Corwin
  - William Murray House built in 1688
  - Yin Yu Tang House, was built around 1800 in China. 200 years after construction the Yin Yu Tang House was disassembled in China, shipped to America and then reassembled inside the Peabody Essex Museum.
- Swampscott
  - Mary Baker Eddy Historic House (Swampscott) – Mary Baker Eddy home (1865–66)
  - Sir John Humphreys House (Swampscott) – built by first Deputy Governor of Massachusetts
  - Elihu Thomson House (Swampscott) – home of Elihu Thomson
  - General Glover House – 1750s home of General John Glover
- Elsewhere
  - Boardman House (Saugus) – c. 1687
  - Brocklebank–Nelson–Beecher House (Georgetown) – c. 1668
  - Claflin–Richards House (Wenham) – c. 1690
  - Cogswell's Grant (Essex) – remarkable collectors' house
  - Mary Baker Eddy Historic Home (Lynn) – first home owned by Mary Baker Eddy
  - Jeremiah Lee Mansion (Marblehead) – 1768
  - The Stevens–Coolidge Place (North Andover) – house museum and garden; late Federal period
  - John Greenleaf Whittier Homestead (Haverhill) – home of poet John Greenleaf Whittier
  - Parson Capen House (Topsfield) – c. 1683

=== Middlesex County ===
- Arlington
  - Jason Russell House (Arlington) – Bloodiest spot in the Battle of Lexington and Concord; built 1740
  - Fowle-Reed-Wyman House (Arlington) - Oldest house in Arlington; c. 1706
- Burlington
  - Wyman House (Burlington) – oldest house in Burlington, built c. 1666
- Cambridge
  - Cooper–Frost–Austin House (Cambridge) – oldest house in Cambridge; built c. 1681
  - Elmwood (Cambridge) – birthplace and home of poet James Russell Lowell; built 1767
  - Asa Gray House (Cambridge) – designed by Ithiel Town, home of botanist Asa Gray
  - Hooper–Lee–Nichols House (Cambridge) – 2nd oldest house in Cambridge; 1685
  - Longfellow House–Washington's Headquarters National Historic Site - built 1759
- Chelmsford
  - Barrett–Byam Homestead – (Chelmsford) – prior to 1663
  - "Old Chelmsford" Garrison House – (Chelmsford) – prior to 1691
- Concord
  - The Old Manse (Concord) – built by Ralph Waldo Emerson's grandfather; Emerson and Nathaniel Hawthorne wrote some of their work in the house; 1770
  - Orchard House (Concord) – home of Louisa May Alcott; the novel Little Women was written here
  - The Wayside (Concord) – built circa 1717; later the home of Samuel Whitney, a Minuteman who fought the British regulars at the North Bridge on April 19, 1775; home of Louisa May Alcott and her family 1845–1848; home of Nathaniel Hawthorne and his family 1852–1870; purchased in 1883 by Boston publisher Daniel Lothrop and his wife, author Harriett Lothrop (pen name Margaret Sidney), whose descendants lived in the house until it was acquired by the National Park Service in 1965.
  - Bush, Ralph Waldo Emerson House (Concord) – home of Ralph Waldo Emerson
  - Reuben Brown House – Colonial style built in 1725
  - Thoreau Birth House—Built by John Wheeler circa 1730; Henry David Thoreau born in the house in 1817; house moved 300 yards to its current location in 1878.
  - Robbins House—Built circa 1790–1800; home of Caesar Robbins, a formerly enslaved African-American and Revolutionary War veteran. In 1870–71, the house was moved to Bedford Street, near Sleepy Hollow Cemetery. In 2011 it was moved to its present site at 320 Monument Street, across from the Old North Bridge and the Old Manse.
- Lexington
  - Hancock–Clarke House (Lexington) – home of the Reverend John Hancock (grandfather of John Hancock, signer of the Declaration of Independence) and the Reverend Jonas Clarke; built between 1698 and 1738 in Lexington, Massachusetts
- Lincoln
  - Codman House (Lincoln) – Federal style; built 1735
  - Gropius House (Lincoln) – designed by Walter Gropius; 1938
  - Hoar Tavern (Lincoln) – Oldest home in Lincoln; built 1680
- Malden
  - Cox-Haven House (Malden) – One of three Stations in Malden that hid Fugitive slaves on the Underground Railroad. The home was also the birthplace of Gilbert Haven Jr. (1821- 1880), the great social reformer and bishop of the Methodist Church. Today located at 35 Clifton St.; built 1790
- Medford
  - Grandfather's House (Medford) – original destination from "Over the River and Through the Woods"
  - Isaac Royall House (Medford) – a very fine mansion from the early 18th century with New England's only surviving slave quarters
  - Peter Tufts House (Medford) – perhaps the oldest all-brick house in the United States
- Lowell
  - Whistler House Museum of Art (Lowell) – birthplace of painter James McNeill Whistler
- Natick
  - Sherman Geissler House – Roger Sherman was a member of the five man drafting committee the "Committee of Five" that wrote the first draft of the Declaration of Independence. In the famous painting by John Trumbull entitled "The Declaration Of Independence" Roger Sherman is depicted literally front and center. He was the only person that signed ALL four great state papers of the United States; The Continental Association, the Declaration of Independence, the Articles of Confederation and the Constitution. He built this house in 1750 in the Bean Hill section of Norwich CT. The house was moved from Norwich, CT to Natick, MA. in 1934
  - Henry Wilson Shoe Shop – Henry Wilson, eighteenth Vice President of the United States, made shoes in this ten footer.
- Newton
  - Dupee Estate–Mary Baker Eddy Home
  - Reginald A. Fessenden House (Newton) – home of technologist Reginald Aubrey Fessenden
- Somerville
  - Samuel Gaut House (Somerville) – Italianate style; built 1855
- Stoneham, Massachusetts
  - Jonathan Green House (Stoneham) – built c. 1720
  - Shoe Shop–Doucette Ten Footer, 1850 ten footer
- Townsend
  - Reed Homestead (Townsend) – murals by Rufus Porter, founder of Scientific American
- Stow
  - Randall–Hale homestead - built c. 1710
- Sudbury
  - Wayside Inn – oldest operating inn in the country, from 1716. Grounds contain one-room schoolhouse associated with the poem Mary Had a Little Lamb.
- Waltham
  - Gore Place (Waltham) – brick country estate; built 1806
  - Lyman Estate (Waltham) – country estate; built 1793
  - Robert Treat Paine Estate (Waltham) – country estate, collaboration of Henry Hobson Richardson and Frederick Law Olmsted; built 1866 and 1884
- Watertown
  - Abraham Browne House (Watertown) – c. 1694–1701
  - Edmund Fowle House (Watertown) – site of revolutionary government and first US treaty; early 1740s
- Woburn
  - 1790 House (Woburn) – large Federal house with interesting history; 1790
  - Baldwin House (Woburn) – home of engineer Col. Loammi Baldwin; 1661
  - Benjamin Thompson House–Count Rumford Birthplace (Woburn) – birthplace of Benjamin Thompson, also known as Count Rumford

=== Norfolk County ===
- Quincy
  - John Adams Birthplace (Quincy) – birthplace of John Adams
  - John Quincy Adams Birthplace (Quincy) – birthplace of John Quincy Adams
  - The Josiah Quincy House (Quincy) – country home of Revolutionary War soldier Colonel Josiah Quincy;1770
  - Peacefield (Quincy) – home of several generations of the Adams family
- Brookline
  - John F. Kennedy National Historic Site, the birthplace of JFK
  - George R. Minot House (Brookline) – home of George R. Minot
- Dedham
  - Endicott Estate Dedham, Massachusetts – home of Henry B. Endicott, designed by Henry Bailey Alden, 1905
  - Endicott House Dedham, Massachusetts – home of H. Wendell Endicott, designed by Charles A. Platt with landscape by Frederick Law Olmsted, 1934
  - Fairbanks House (Dedham) – North America's oldest surviving timber-frame house; built c. 1641
- Needham
  - Jarvis Thorpe House (Needham) – Built in 1836, served as Needham's Post Office as well as home to the influential Thorpe family.
- Elsewhere
  - Captain Robert Bennet Forbes House (Milton) – Greek Revival architecture
  - Eleanor Cabot Bradley Estate (Canton) – country house with garden grounds
  - General Sylvanus Thayer Birthplace (Braintree) – birthplace of Sylvanus Thayer, "Father of West Point"

=== Suffolk County ===
- Boston
  - First Harrison Gray Otis House (Boston) – by Charles Bulfinch
  - Second Harrison Gray Otis House (Boston) – by Charles Bulfinch
  - Third Harrison Gray Otis House (Boston) – by Charles Bulfinch
  - Amory–Ticknor House (Boston) by Charles Bulfinch
  - Isabella Stewart Gardner Museum (Boston) – Remarkable palazzo and art museum
  - Gibson House Museum (Boston) – unchanged Back Bay townhouse lived in by 3 generations of Gibsons; built 1859
  - Paul Revere House (Boston) – built in 1680
  - Pierce–Hichborn House (Boston) – an early Georgian house; 1711
  - Nichols House Museum (Boston) - by Charles Bulfinch
- Dorchester
  - James Blake House (Dorchester) – oldest house in Boston; 1648
  - Captain Lemuel Clap House (Dorchester) – built for a descendant of an original settler; 1710 and 1765
  - William Clapp House (Dorchester) – Federal style with Greek Revival addition; 1806
  - Pierce House (Dorchester, Massachusetts) - First period house; c. 1683
- Roxbury
  - William Lloyd Garrison House (Roxbury) – William Lloyd Garrison's home
  - Shirley–Eustis House (Roxbury) – Tory stronghold
  - Edward Everett Hale House (Roxbury)- Home of famed author and minister Edward Everett Hale; 1841
- Elsewhere
  - Loring–Greenough House (Jamaica Plain) – Tory stronghold
  - Ellen Swallow Richards House (Jamaica Plain) – home of Ellen Swallow Richards

== Southeastern Massachusetts ==
=== Bristol County ===
- Dartmouth
  - Elihu Akin House – cape-style house built; built in 1762
- Fall River
  - David M. Anthony House – Second Empire style, built 1875
  - Ariadne J. and Mary A. Borden House – Second Empire, built 1882
  - Borden–Winslow House – Georgian Colonial, built 1740
  - Lafayette–Durfee House – Georgian Colonial, built about 1750
  - William Lindsey House – Greek Revival, built 1844
  - Luther Winslow Jr. House – Federal, built 1875
  - Osborn House – Greek Revival, built 1843
- Mansfield
  - Fisher-Richardson House - built 1743
- New Bedford
  - Rotch–Jones–Duff House and Garden Museum – home of William Rotch Jr., a whaling merchant; built in 1834
- Rehoboth
  - Christopher Carpenter House – built 1800
  - Col. Thomas Carpenter III House – built 1855
  - Carpenter House (Rehoboth, Massachusetts) – built 1789
- Taunton
  - J.C. Bartlett House – built, 1880
  - Samuel Colby House – Italianate, built 1869
  - McKinstrey House – Georgian colonial, built 1759
  - Morse House – built 1850
  - William L. White Jr. House – Second Empire, built 1873

=== Plymouth County ===
- Duxbury
  - Alden House Historic Site (Duxbury) – purportedly built by the Pilgrim John Alden; originally thought built in 1653, though later evidence suggests c. 1700
  - King Caesar House (Duxbury) – home of Ezra Weston, II ("King Caesar"); built 1808
  - Nathaniel Winsor Jr. House (Duxbury) – built 1807
- Plymouth
  - Harlow Old Fort House (Plymouth) – built with timbers from the Pilgrims 1621 Fort on Burial Hill; built in 1677
  - The Jabez Howland House (Plymouth) – home of Mayflower passenger John Howland; built in 1667
  - Richard Sparrow House (Plymouth) – oldest house in Plymouth; owned by the Sparrow family, who arrived Plymouth in 1633; the house was built c. 1640
- Hingham
  - Samuel Lincoln House (Hingham) – built by Samuel Lincoln 1721 on land purchased in 1649 by grandfather Samuel Lincoln, ancestor of President Abraham Lincoln
- Marshfield
  - Isaac Winslow House (Marshfield) – Tory stronghold
  - Thomas-Webster Estate (Marshfield, Massachusetts) – site of Webster Law Office and Webster Family home
  - Marcia Thomas House (Marshfield) – built in 1835, home of first Historian of Marshfield
- Elsewhere
  - Old Oaken Bucket Homestead (Scituate) – scene of Samuel Woodworth's poem "The Old Oaken Bucket"

== Cape Cod and the islands ==
=== Barnstable County ===
- Atwood House Museum, Chatham – built 1756
- Isaac Crocker Homestead, Marstons Mills – built c. 1750s
- Winslow Crocker House, Yarmouth Port – built c. 1780
- Hoxie House, Sandwich – Cape Cod's oldest saltbox house; built c. 1675
- Wing Fort House, East Sandwich, Massachusetts – built ca. 1641

=== Dukes County ===
- The Vincent House, Martha's Vineyard – oldest house in Martha's Vineyard; built c. 1672
- The Thomas Chase House, Martha's Vineyard – oldest house in downtown Vineyard Haven; built c. 1717

=== Nantucket County ===
- Auld Lang Syne House, Nantucket Sconset – oldest house in Nantucket not on the original foundation, ca. 1675
- Jethro Coffin House, Nantucket – oldest house in Nantucket on its original foundation; built c. 1686

== See also ==
- Historic New England
- The Trustees of Reservations
- List of National Historic Landmarks in Massachusetts
- List of the oldest buildings in Massachusetts
- First Period houses in Massachusetts (1620–1659)
- First Period houses in Massachusetts (1660–1679)
- List of Registered Historic Places in Massachusetts
