= McKinstrey House =

Historic house in Massachusetts, United States

- U.S. National Register of Historic Places
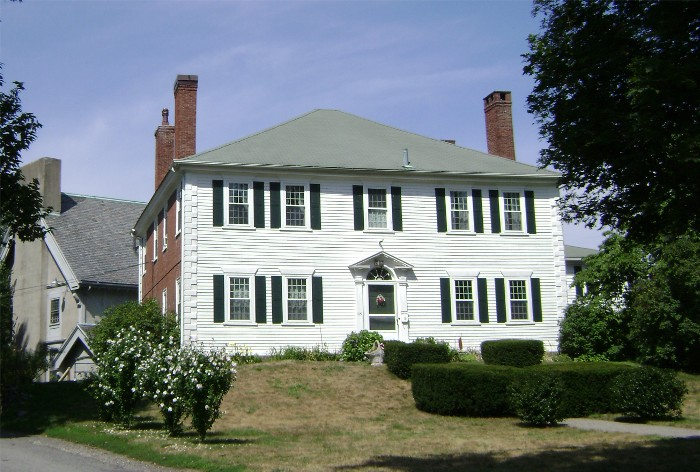

- Location within Massachusetts Location within the United States
- Location: 111 High St., Taunton, Massachusetts
- Coordinates: 41°53′58″N 71°5′50″W
- Built: 1759
- Architectural style: Georgian
- MPS: Taunton MRA
- NRHP reference No.: 84002181
- Added to NRHP: July 5, 1984

The McKinstrey House is a historic house located at 111 High Street in Taunton, Massachusetts.

== Description and history ==
It was built in 1759 for surgeon William McKinstry, born in Ellington, Connecticut. He was a Tory in the Revolution, and died of tuberculosis on a ship in Boston Harbor at the evacuation of Boston in 1776. The house and property were confiscated by the Massachusetts Legislature in 1779. The 2-story brick-end house is arranged on a symmetrical 5-bay plan with a hipped roof framed by four interior chimneys.

He is mentioned in the Diary of John Adams (June 1771). In June 1763, the house was the scene of a grisly murder where the McKinstrey's sister Elizabeth was murdered by an enslaved man called Bristol.

It was added to the National Register of Historic Places on July 5, 1984. It is now the rectory for St. Thomas Episcopal Church, next door.

== See also ==
- National Register of Historic Places listings in Taunton, Massachusetts
- List of historic houses in Massachusetts
