= Cotting–Smith Assembly House =

Historic building in Massachusetts, United States

- Cotting-Smith Assembly House
- U.S. Historic district – Contributing property
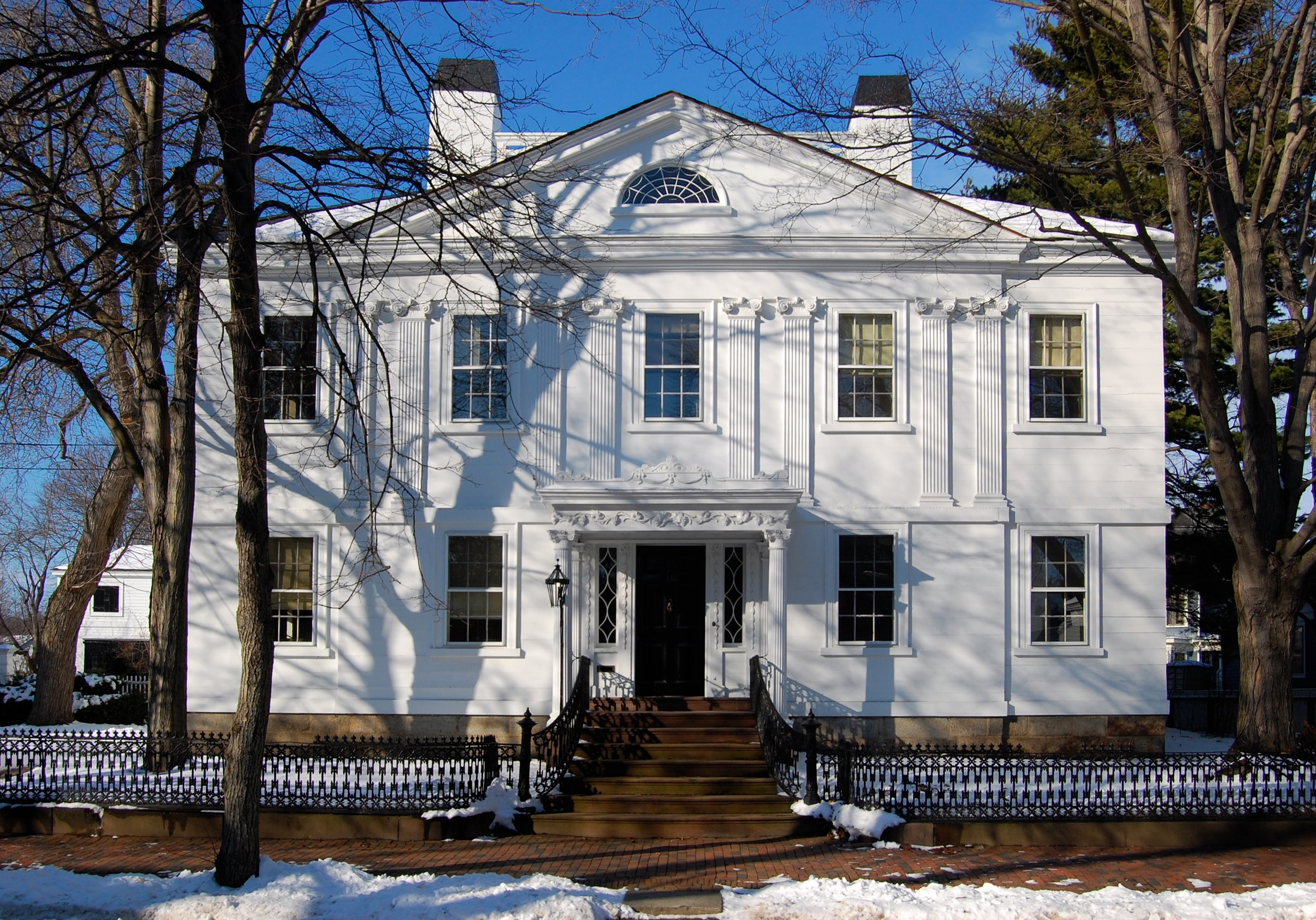
- Cotting-Smith Assembly house at 138 Federal Street

- Location within Massachusetts Location within the United States
- Location: 138 Federal St., Salem, Massachusetts
- Coordinates: 42°31′14.7″N 70°54′13.8″W
- Built: 1782
- Architect: Samuel McIntire (remodel)
- Architectural style: Federal
- Part of: Federal Street District (ID83000576)
- Designated CP: 1983

The Cotting–Smith Assembly House was built in 1782 and is located at 138 Federal Street in the Federal Street District in Salem, Massachusetts, United States. It is owned by the Peabody Essex Museum. Built as a Federalist Clubhouse in which balls, concerts, lectures, and other events might be held. George Washington attended a dance here. The original architect is unknown, but the house was later remodeled by Samuel McIntire for use as a private residence. The house is in the Federal style and is part of the Federal Street District, which is listed in the National Register of Historic Places. The building can be rented for special events.

== See also ==
- List of the oldest buildings in Massachusetts
- List of historic houses in Massachusetts

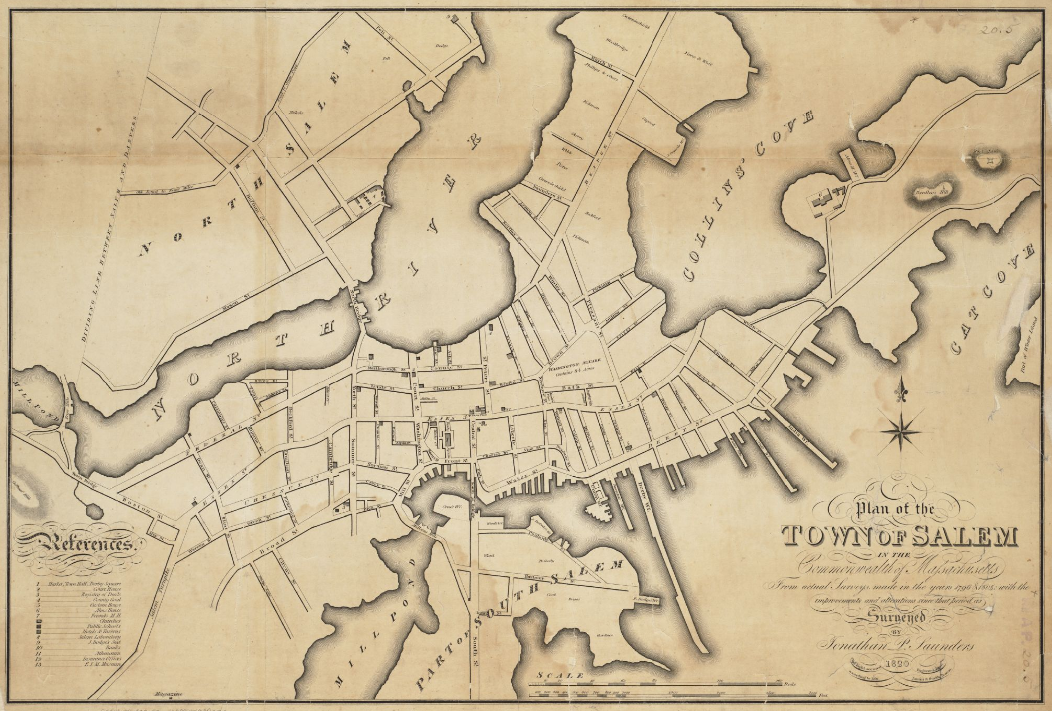
Salem - 1820
