= Judge Samuel Holten House =

Historic house in Massachusetts, USA

Coordinates: 42°33′39.14″N 70°57′31.16″W

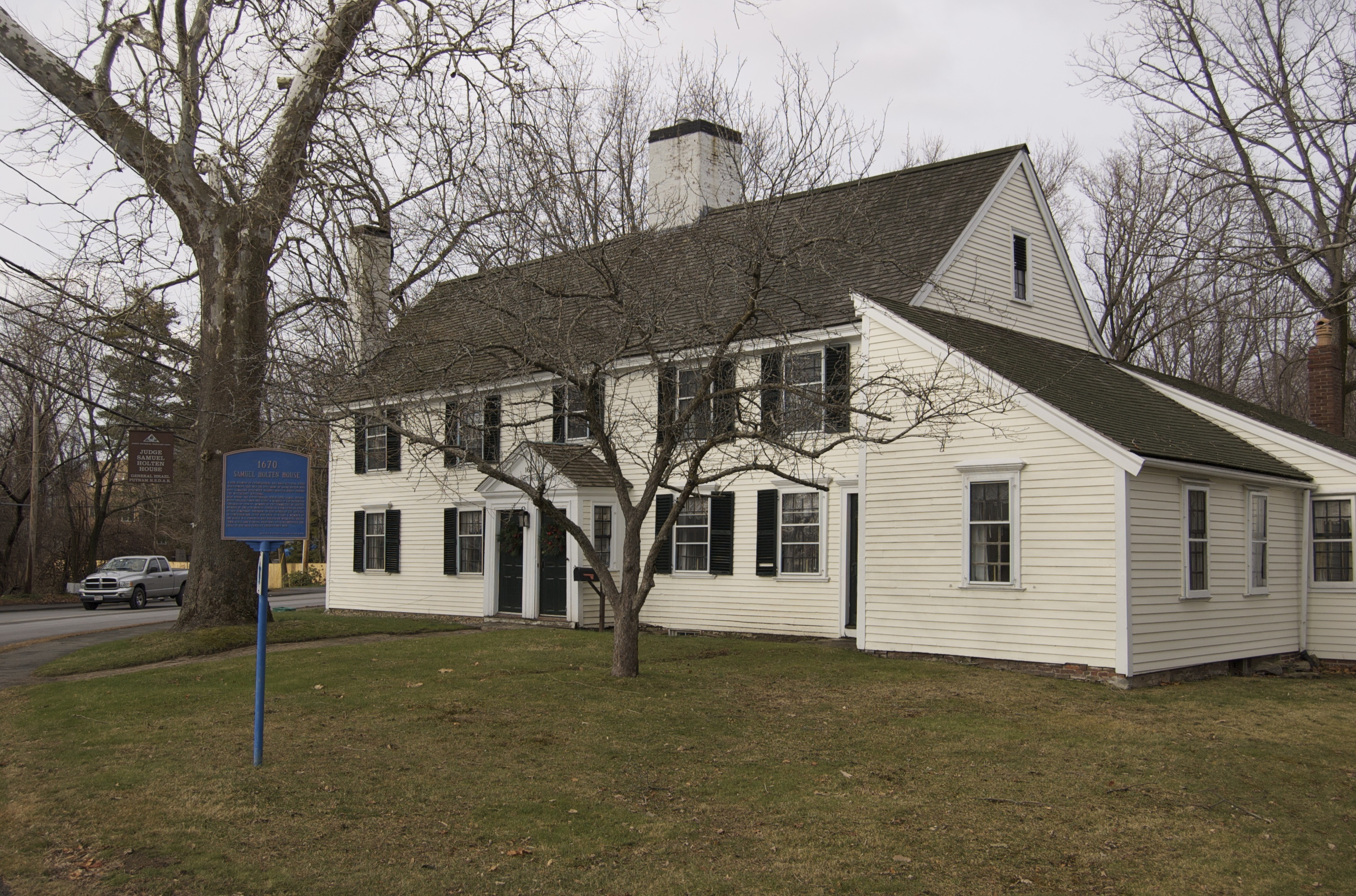
Judge Samuel Holten House at the corner of Holten and Centre Streets

The Judge Samuel Holten House (circa 1670) is a historic house located at 171 Holten Street, Danvers, Massachusetts. It is currently owned by the Daughters of the American Revolution, and open by appointment.

The colonial site first belonged to Richard Ingersoll (died 1644). In 1670 his wife left the land to her second husband upon her death, and thence to his daughter Sarah, whose second husband Joseph Holten deeded the lot (and perhaps also the house) to his son Benjamin Holten. Benjamin died in 1689, and his will records both the land and a house. Given this background, it is believed that Benjamin Holten built the house circa 1670 in a typical "one-room" layout. Multiple additions were made over the centuries.

The house is historically interesting as the home of Sarah Holten, who in 1692 gave testimony against Rebecca Nurse which led to her death in the Salem Witch Trials. During the American Revolutionary War, it was the home of Judge Samuel Holten, a Founding Father of the United States who served in the Continental Congress, including as its president pro tempore, was a signer of the Articles of Confederation, and who was an early member of the United States House of Representatives (March 4, 1793 – March 3, 1795).

The house remained in the Holten family until the Civil War era, when it was then sold to Thomas Palmer. Who then sold the property to the Daughters of the American Revolution in 1921, the house has since been extensively restored.

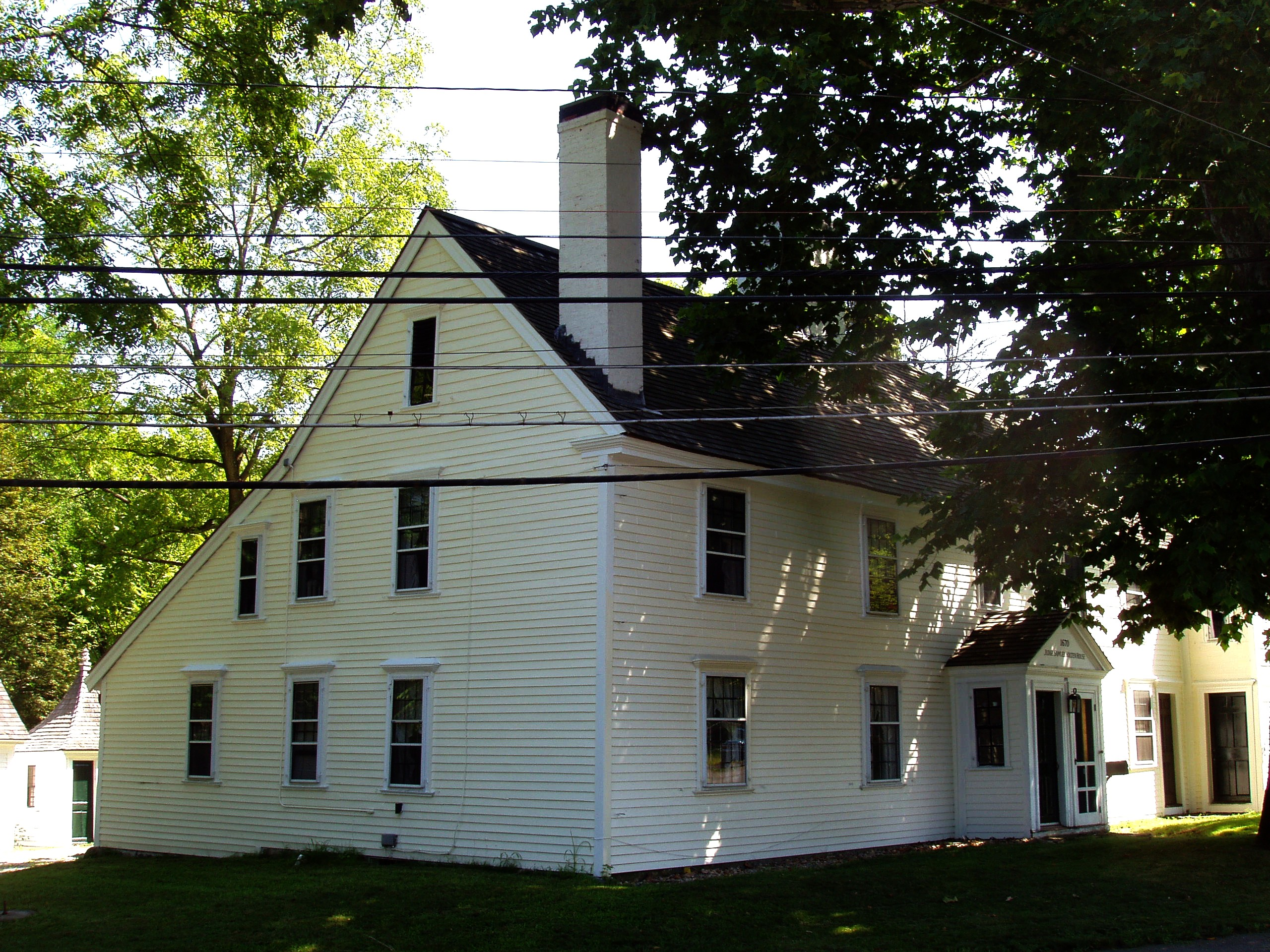
West elevation.

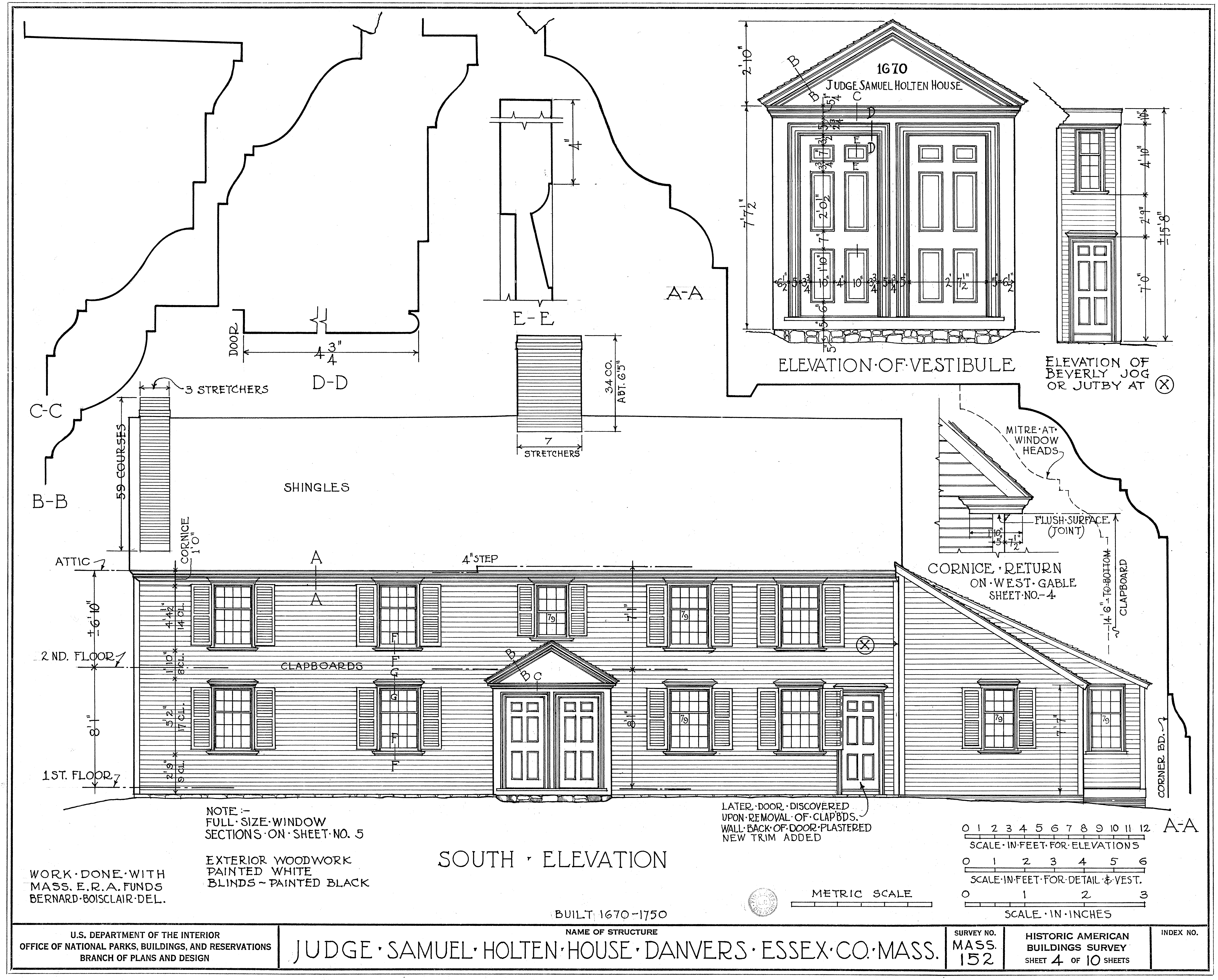
Judge Samuel Holten House, south elevation.

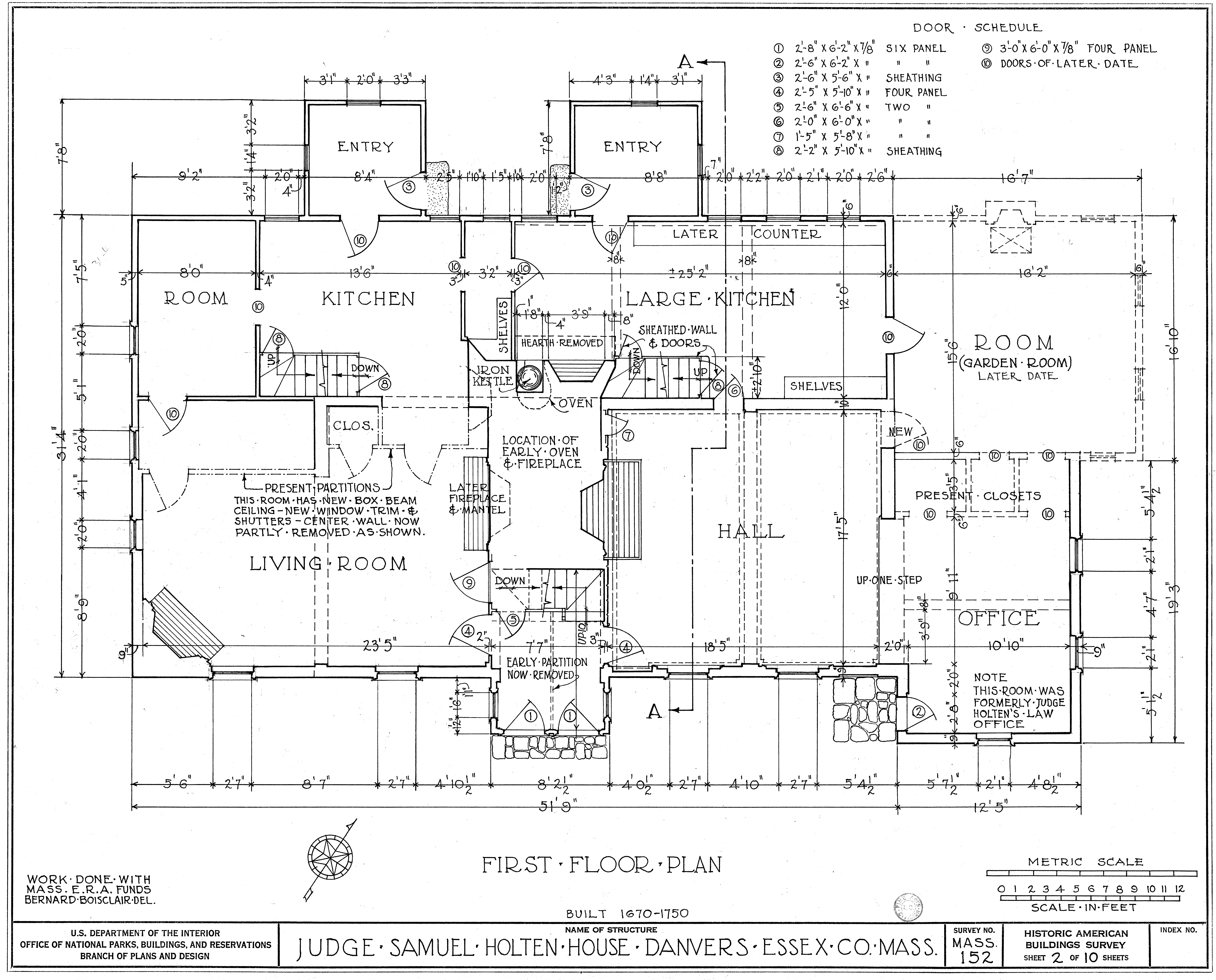
Judge Samuel Holten House, first floor.

== See also ==
- List of historic houses in Massachusetts
