= Lafayette–Durfee House =

Historic house in Massachusetts, United States

- U.S. National Register of Historic Places
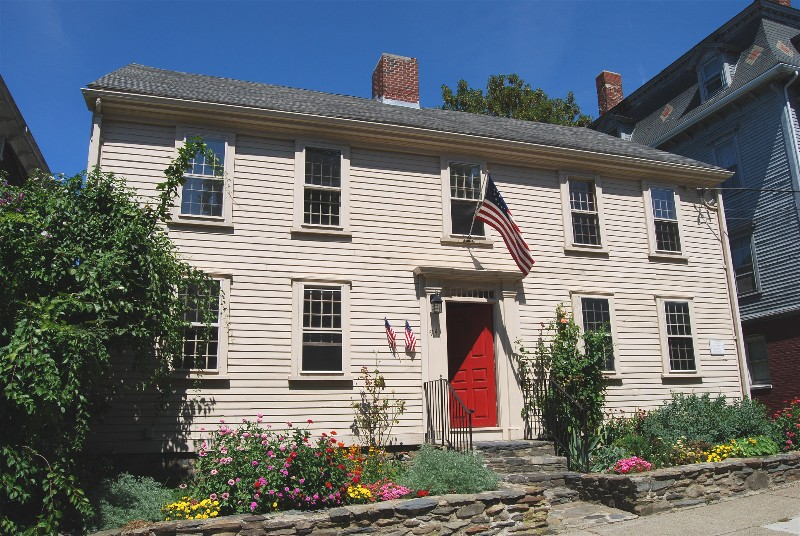

- Location within Massachusetts Location within the United States
- Location: Fall River, Massachusetts
- Coordinates: 41°42′21″N 71°9′26″W
- Architect: Unknown
- NRHP reference No.: 82004959
- Added to NRHP: April 15, 1982

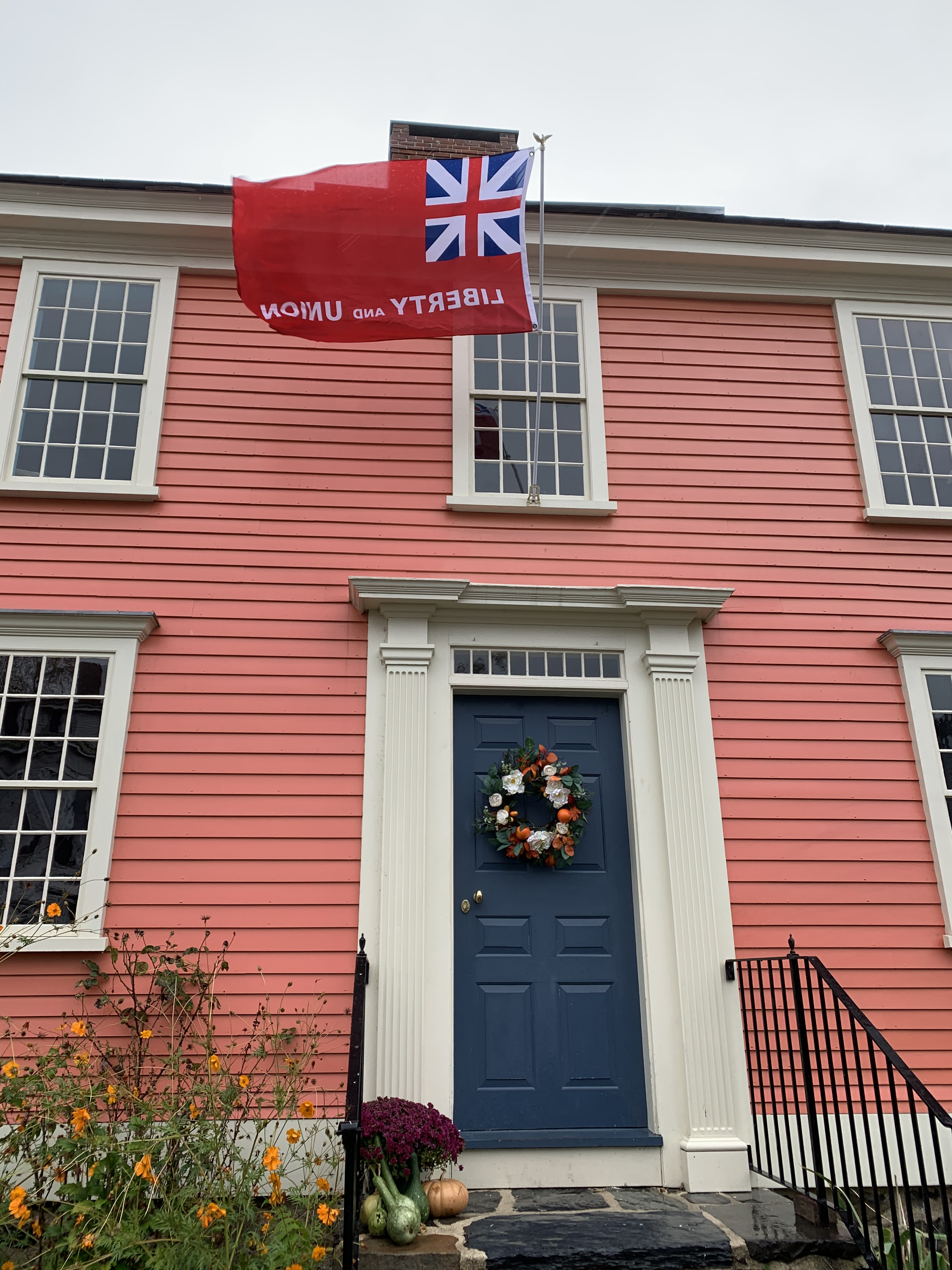
LDH

The Lafayette–Durfee House is a historic house located at 94 Cherry Street in Fall River, Massachusetts. The house was originally located at the site of the old Fall River Superior Courthouse now the Fall River Children's Museum on 441 North Main Street, and owned by Judge Thomas Durfee. While the exact date of its construction is not known, it is estimated to have been built before 1750.

The large property which the house was originally situated on stretched from the shore the Taunton River all the way to North Watuppa Pond. However, Thomas Durfee mortgaged all of his land to help finance the American Revolution.

His son Joseph, became a colonel and served with the Marquis de Lafayette at the Battle of White Plains, New York and also in Rhode Island; Joseph also commanded a company of men at the Battle of Fall River. The Durfee's would host Lafayette at their home in the summer of 1778, as well on other occasions.This is anecdotal.

About 1872 the house was moved to its current location on Cherry Street. It was owned by members of the Lewin family until 1936.

In 1973, with the help of Caroline Durfee, a descendant of Thomas Durfee, a group was formed to preserve the house. During the United States Bicentennial year of 1976, a time capsule was placed in the base of one of the fireplaces.

The house was added to the National Register of Historic Places in 1982. Today, a non-profit group the Lafayette Durfee Historical Foundation, Inc. maintains the house and gives tours usually during Fall to Spring.

== See also ==
- National Register of Historic Places listings in Fall River, Massachusetts
- List of historic houses in Massachusetts
