= Rufus Choate House =

Historic house in Massachusetts, United States

- U.S. National Register of Historic Places
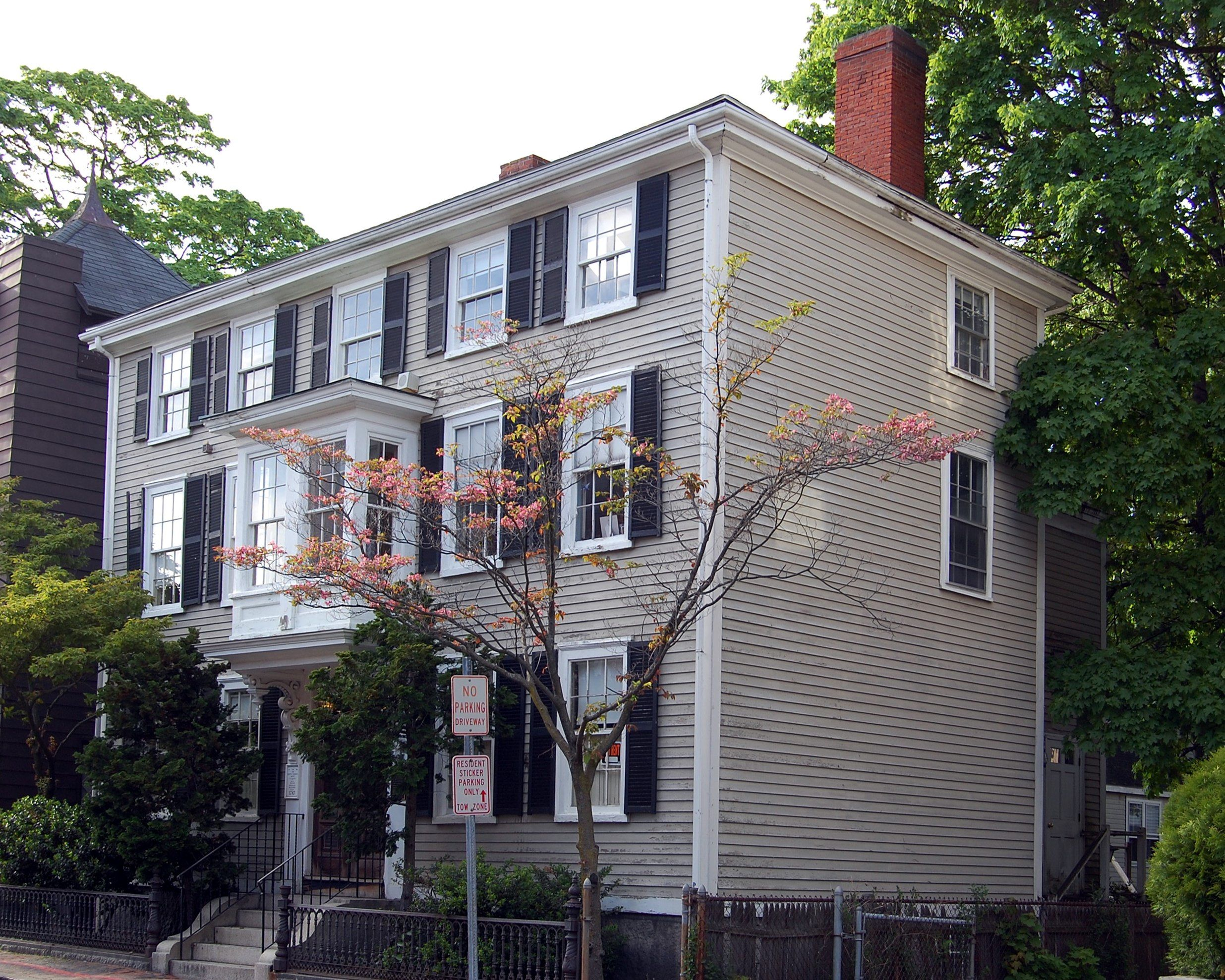
- Rufus Choate House

- Location within Massachusetts Location within the United States
- Location: Salem, Massachusetts
- Coordinates: 42°31′21″N 70°53′48″W
- Built: 1787
- Architectural style: Federal
- NRHP reference No.: 82000481
- Added to NRHP: November 12, 1982

The Rufus Choate House is a historic house at 14 Lynde Street in Salem, Massachusetts. It is primarily recognized for its association with lawyer and Federalist Party politician Rufus Choate (1799-1859), who lived here from about 1825 to 1834. It is a three-story Federal style wood-frame house that was built in 1805 by Ebenezer Beckford, a Salem merchant and real estate developer. Beckford, and later his same-named son, owned the property until 1841.

The house was listed on the National Register of Historic Places in 1982.

== See also ==
- Downtown Salem District, whose western edge is a few buildings to the east
- Chestnut Street District, which begins a block west at North Street
- Federal Street District, just to the property's north
- National Register of Historic Places listings in Salem, Massachusetts
- National Register of Historic Places listings in Essex County, Massachusetts
