= Yin Yu Tang House =

Historic house museum

Coordinates: 42°31′16.3″N 70°53′31.8″W

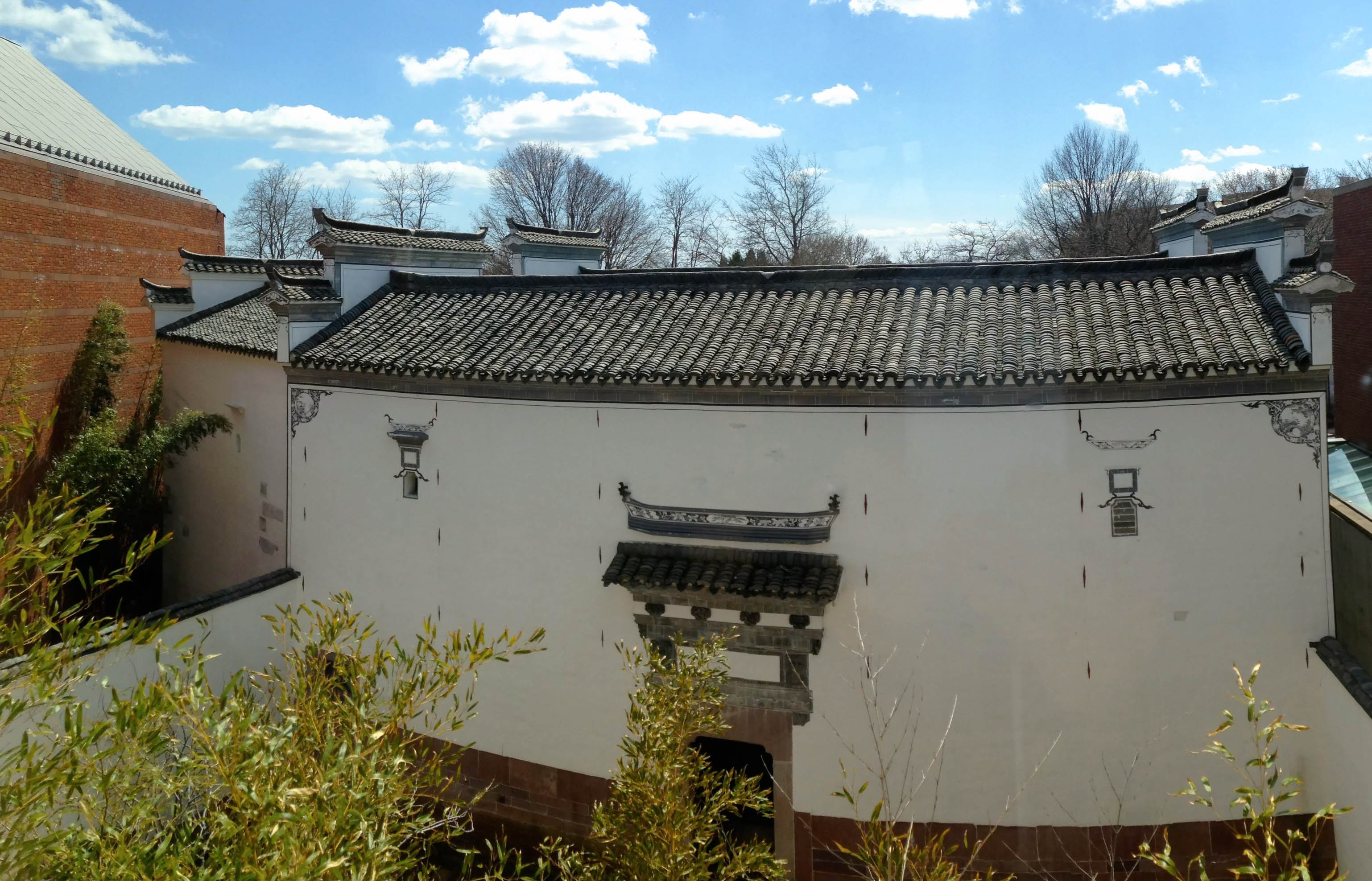
The Yin Yu Tang house, photographed from an upstairs window in the Peabody Essex Museum

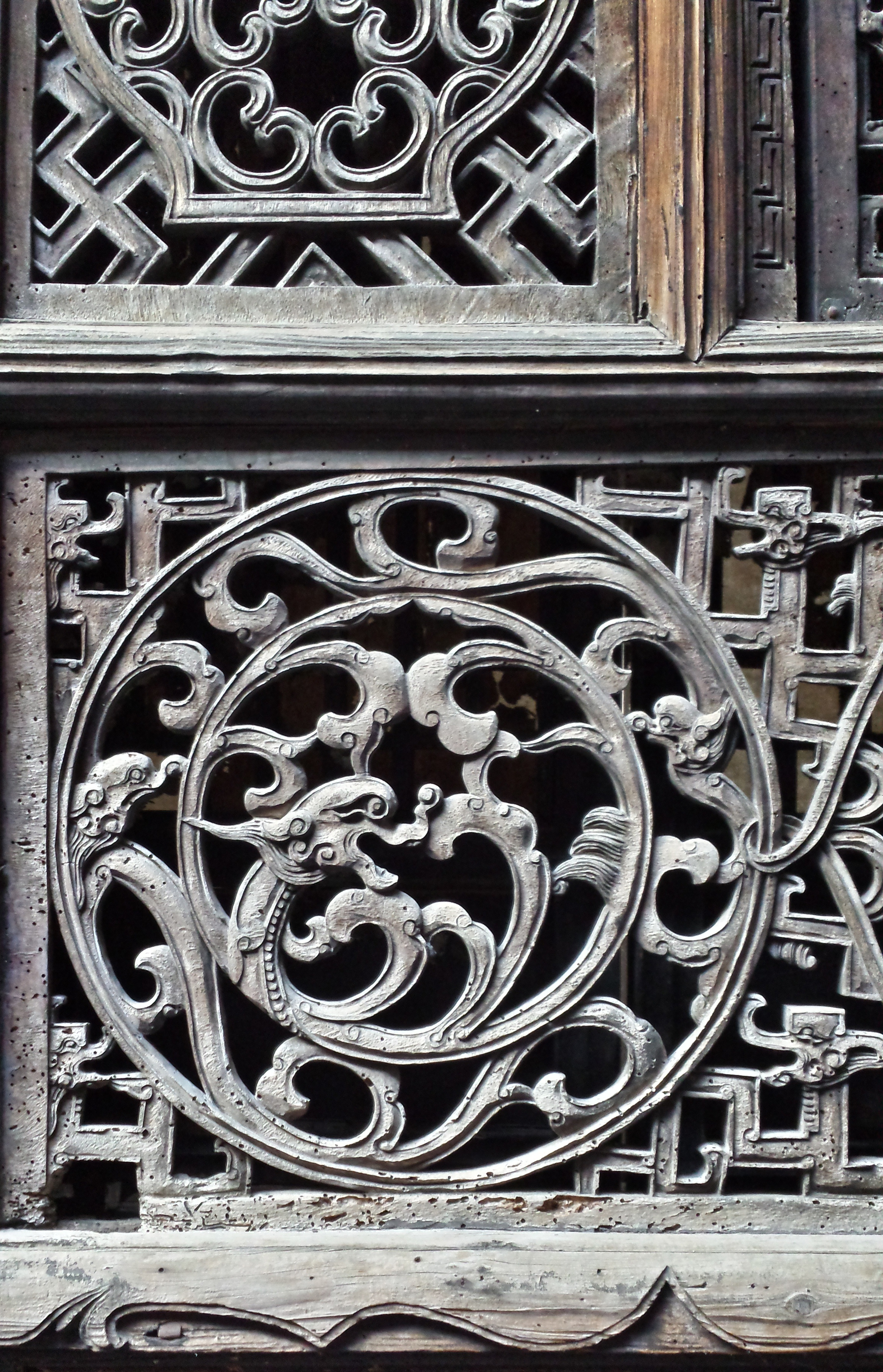
Intricately carved wooden panels on the first floor of the Yin Yu Tang House

Yin Yu Tang House (蔭餘堂) is a late 18th-century Chinese house from Anhui province that had been removed from its original village and re-erected in Salem, Massachusetts. In North America it is the only example of historic Chinese vernacular architecture. The Yin Yu Tang (Hall of Plentiful Shelter) was built in the late eighteenth century during the Qing dynasty (1644–1911).

A prosperous merchant surnamed Huang built a stately sixteen-bedroom house in China's southeastern Huizhou region, calling his home Yin Yu Tang House. This Chinese merchant commissioned the construction of the house in the province of his birth, Anhui, China. The five-bay, two-story residence was typical of its region, built of timber-frame construction, with a tile roof and exterior masonry walls of sandstone and brick. The house is about 47 feet 6 inches by 52 feet 5 1/2 inches not including the kitchens. In addition to sixteen bedrooms there are also two reception areas, a storage room, and a courtyard in the center. There are also large intricately carved wooden panels that cover the inner windows on the first floor.

The house survived economic and political upheavals, and was home to eight generations of the Huang family. By the mid-1980s the house stood empty. Local and national authorities, with the endorsement of the original owner's descendants, gave permission for the house (and its contents) to be relocated to the Peabody Essex Museum (PEM) in Salem, Massachusetts. The house opened in June 2003 as a permanent exhibit at the PEM. Yin Yu Tang is available for timed, self-guided audio tours.

A children's book titled Piece by Piece was written by Susan Tan and illustrated by Justine Wong. It follows a young girl's adventure through the museum and Yin Yu Tang House as she searches for a lost blanket. It was published by PEM and Six Foot Press in 2019.

== Incidents ==
- According to Harvard alumna Nancy Berliner (白铃安), during the construction, one incident involved a raccoon that entered the storage room. The Chinese craftsmen killed it with a shovel, skinned it, and cooked it for food.

== See also ==
- List of historic houses in Massachusetts
