= Samuel Colby House =

Historic house in Massachusetts, United States

- U.S. National Register of Historic Places
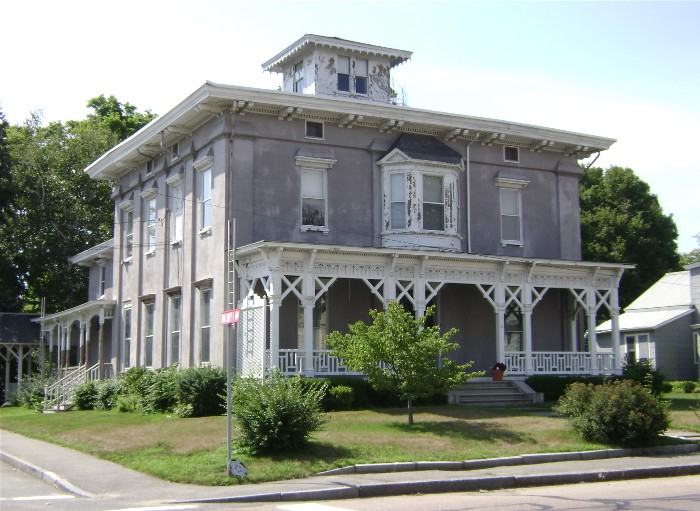

- Location within Massachusetts Location within the United States
- Location: 74 Winthrop St., Taunton, Massachusetts
- Coordinates: 41°53′50″N 71°5′55″W
- Built: 1869
- Architectural style: Stick/Eastlake, Italianate
- MPS: Taunton MRA
- NRHP reference No.: 84002103
- Added to NRHP: July 5, 1984

The Samuel Colby House is a historic house located at 74 Winthrop Street in Taunton, Massachusetts. Built in 1869 for a prominent local businessman, it is one of the city's best examples of high-style Italianate architecture. It was listed on the National Register of Historic Places in 1984.

== Description and history ==
The Samuel Colby House is located south of downtown Taunton, on the south side of Winthrop Street at its junction with Walnut Street. It is a two-story wood-frame structure, with a stuccoed finish, and a low-pitch hip roof capped by a large square cupola. The main roof has elongated eaves studded with paired brackets, and the cupola roof has a curtain-style valance. The house is three bays wide, with a polygonal bay above the main entrance at the center of the front facade. The bays are demarcated by pilasters, and a single-story porch extends across the width of the front. The porch has a flat roof with bracketed eave, and is extensively decorated with stickwork. A similar porch extends along the side of the rear ell, facing Walnut Street.

The house was built in 1869 for Samuel Colby, a manufacturer and retailer of men's and boy's clothing who operated a store in the Union Block in downtown Taunton. It is one of the city's least-altered post-Civil War 19th-century houses, and a particularly distinctive example of high-style Italianate architecture.

== See also ==
- National Register of Historic Places listings in Taunton, Massachusetts
- List of historic houses in Massachusetts
