= Barrett–Byam Homestead =

Historic house in Chelmsford, Massachusetts, United States

Coordinates: 42.5819°N 71.3706°W

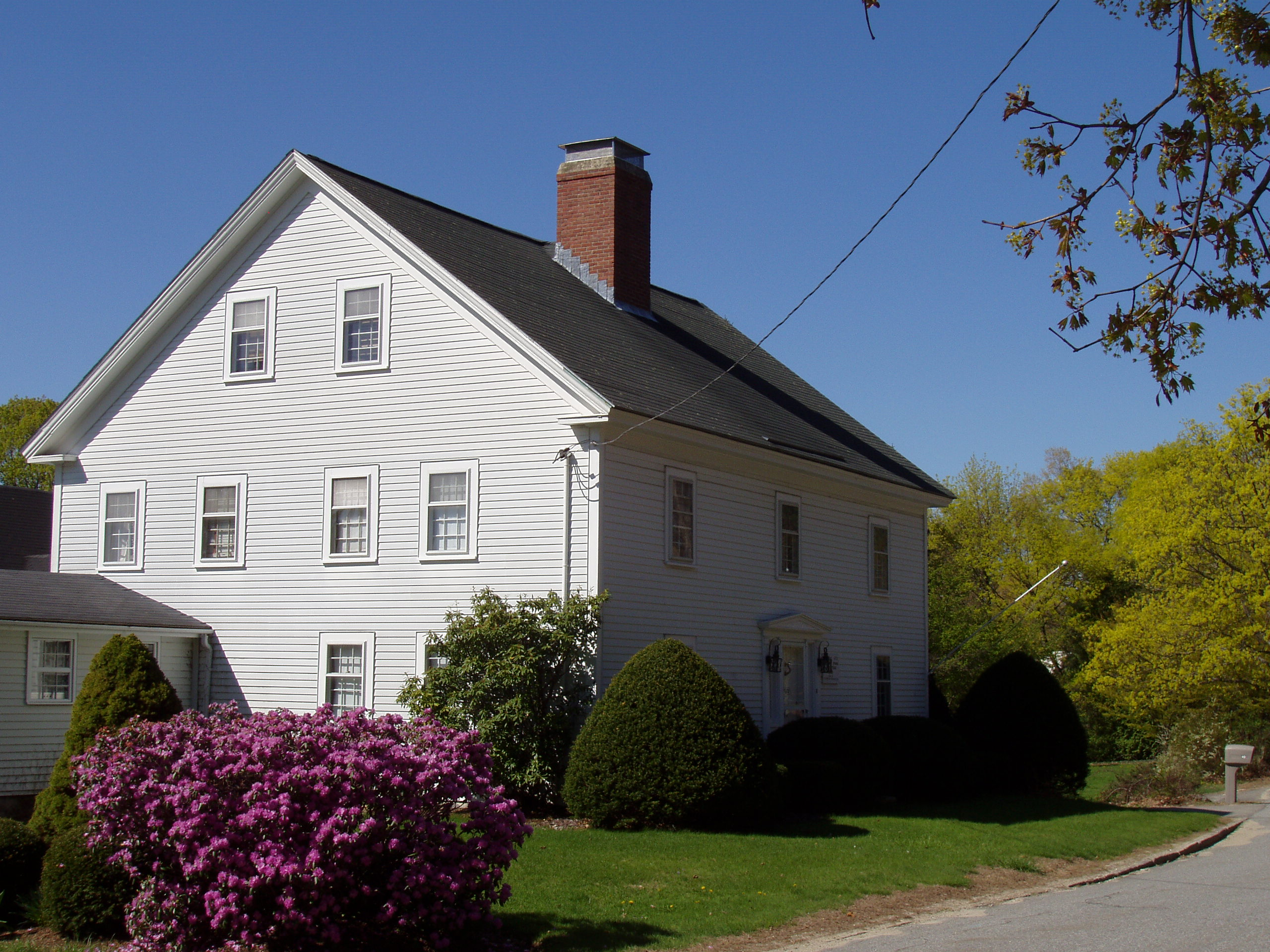
The Barrett–Byam Homestead

The Barrett–Byam Homestead is a historic house, now headquarters of the Chelmsford Historical Society, located at 40 Byam Road, Chelmsford, Massachusetts, United States. The original house dates to circa 1663, though much or all today's structure may date from the mid-18th century.

The homestead was established in 1663 by Thomas Barrett, who bought a house and 52 acres (21 ha) of land from a James Parker. It was originally built as south-facing "saltbox" with a central chimney and fireplace in every room. The heating system appears to have been rebuilt circa 1800 with Rumford fireplaces in each room.

== See also ==
- List of historic houses in Massachusetts
