= Stephen Phillips House =

Coordinates: 42.5192°N 70.9026°W

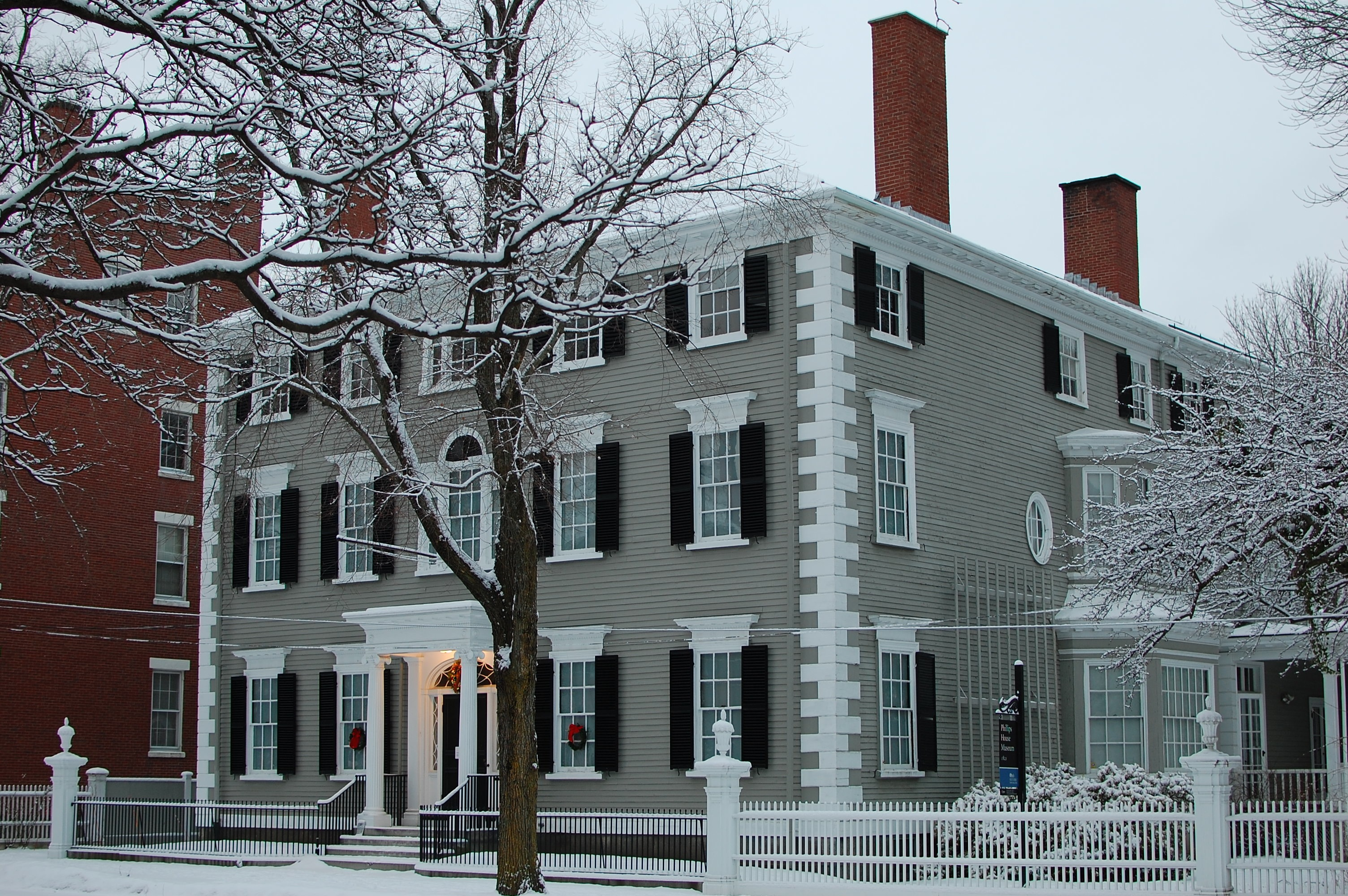
Phillips House at 34 Chestnut Street

The Stephen Phillips House is a historic house and museum located in the McIntire Historic District in Salem, Massachusetts, United States and was designed by Samuel McIntyre.

Phillips House began with Elias Hasket Derby, one of America's first self-made millionaires from the sea trade. When he died in 1799, his daughter, Elizabeth and her husband, Captain Nathaniel West, inherited his farm in Danvers, Massachusetts. They built a country house on the property, sparing little expense. A grand estate was in the making. In 1806, shortly after the house was completed, a divorce forced Nathaniel off the property. After Elizabeth died in 1814, the house was left to her three daughters. When one of the daughters died in 1819, Nathaniel inherited one-third of the estate. He proceeded to move four rooms to Salem, the museum's present location. At that time, he added a hallway, a third floor, and a back ell section. In 1911, Stephen W. Phillips bought the house, moving in with five generations of family furnishings. He lived in the house until his death in 1955. The house remains as it was at that time, containing an eclectic collection representing the Phillips's extensive travels.

The Phillips House is now owned and operated as a historic house museum by Historic New England and is open for public tours.

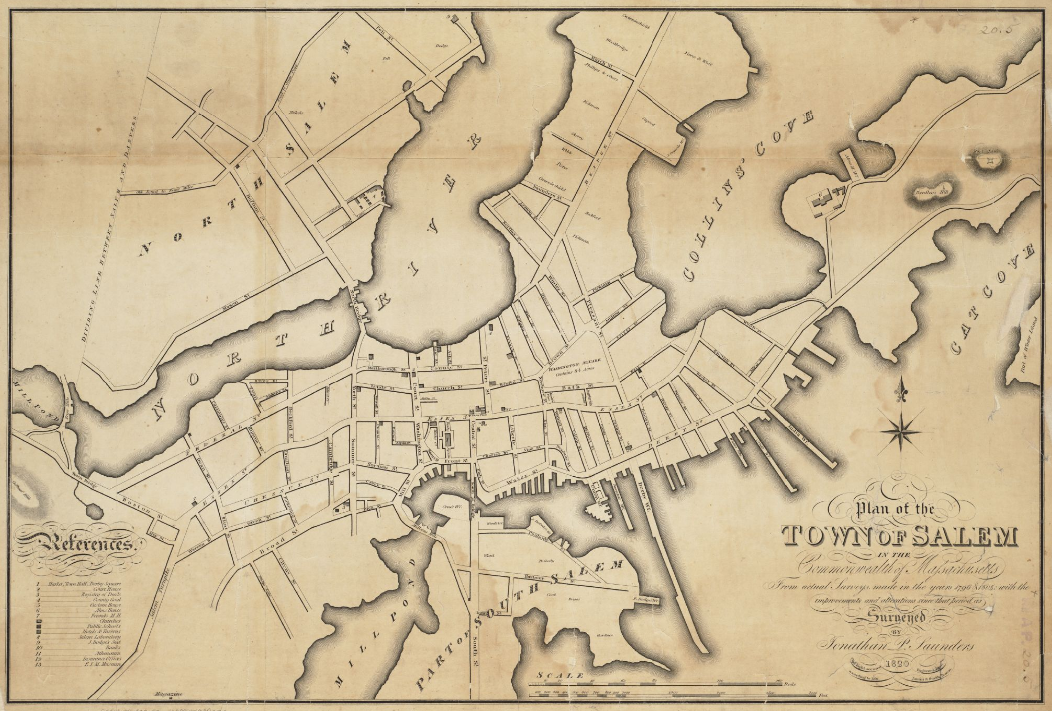
Salem - 1820

== See also ==
- List of historic houses in Massachusetts
