= Quaker Meeting House (Peabody Essex Museum) =

Coordinates: 42°31′22.0″N 70°53′29.6″W

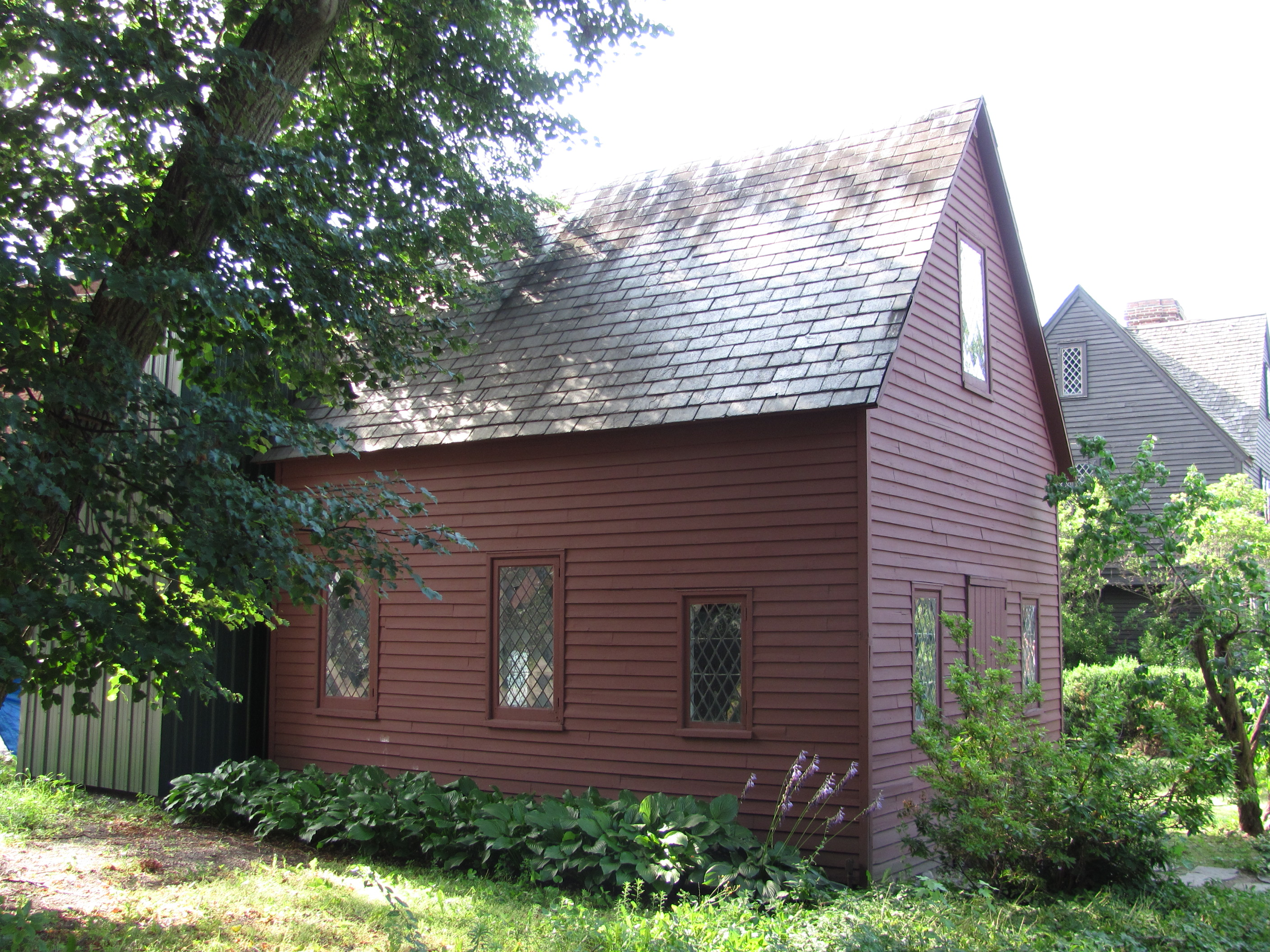
Quaker Meeting House

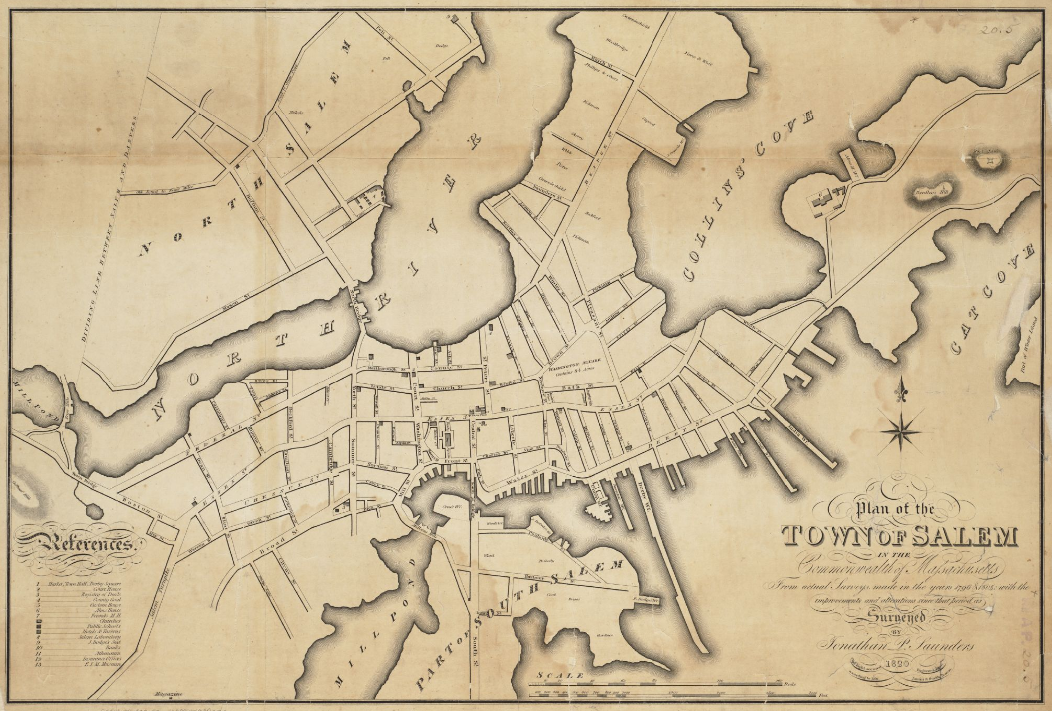
Salem - 1820

The first Quaker Meeting House (Federal Garden area) in Salem, Massachusetts was built during the autumn of 1688 by Quaker Thomas Maule. Much of the building was constructed using old timber repurposed from other buildings.

On October 13, 1690, Maule conveyed the Meeting House and land for £45 to Josiah and Daniel Southwick (sons of persecuted and banished Quakers Lawrence Southwick and Cassandra Burnell Southwick), Samuel Gaskill (husband of the Southwick's daughter Provided), Caleb Buffum, Christopher Foster, and Sarah Stone. Meetings were held in this building for nearly 30 years. Despite the small number of attendees, by 1714 additions were made after the Meeting House was considered inadequate in size. On October 3, 1716, the four surviving deed-holding Friends agreed to sell the Meeting House and land back to Maule for £25.

Over the years, until sometime around 1860 when it was moved to the grounds of the Essex Institute, the building was used as a small home by several families, a barn, cow barn, hen house, and finally a wood shed. Several children were born in the building between 1775-1787.

The current building, now part of the Peabody Essex Museum and erected in 1865 to resemble a Post-Medieval or First Period structure, is a reconstruction of the Quaker Meeting House and may contain some of the original timber framing. It is a very early example of an architectural re-creation.

== See also ==
- Peabody Essex Museum
- List of historic houses in Massachusetts
