= J.C. Bartlett House =

Historic house in Massachusetts, United States

- U.S. National Register of Historic Places
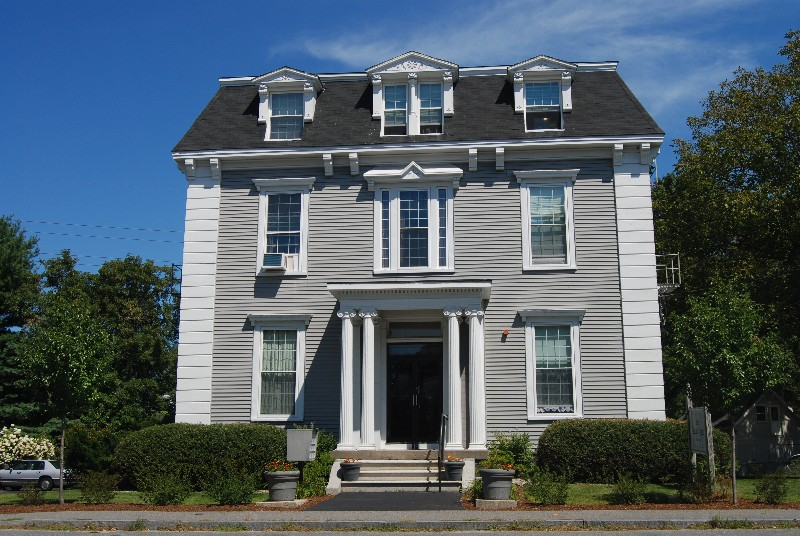

- Location within Massachusetts Location within the United States
- Location: 12 Walnut Street, Taunton, Massachusetts
- Coordinates: 41°53′47″N 71°5′50″W
- Built: 1880
- Architectural style: Second Empire, Italianate
- MPS: Taunton MRA
- NRHP reference No.: 84002089
- Added to NRHP: July 5, 1984

The J.C. Bartlett House is a historic house located in Taunton, Massachusetts. The house was built in 1880 for J.C. Bartlett, a prosperous mining engineer. It was added to the National Register of Historic Places in 1984.

The large-scaled Mansard house features bold Italianate details in its justified quoins, bracketed cornice and window detailing. It originally had decorative iron cresting on its roof, that has since been removed. The exterior has been partially covered with vinyl siding. The original slate Mansard roof has been replaced with asphalt shingles.

== See also ==
- National Register of Historic Places listings in Taunton, Massachusetts
- List of historic houses in Massachusetts
