= Atwood House Museum =

Atwood Museum
- Interactive map of the Atwood Museum area

General information
- Type: Colonial with gambrel roof and modern additions
- Location: 347 Stage Harbor Road, Chatham, Massachusetts, USA
- Coordinates: 41.673274°N 69.965237°W
- Completed: c. 1752
- Renovated: 1949, 2005
- Owner: Chatham Historical Society (MA)

Other information
- Parking: yes

Website
- http://www.chathamhistoricalsociety.org/

The Atwood Museum in Chatham, Massachusetts is a property of the Chatham Historical Society which, in 1926, purchased the property of Captain Joseph Atwood (1720–1794) to protect the property and to display and preserve articles and documents related to Chatham's history. The portion of the museum which is the original house was built about 1752, making it one the oldest structures in Chatham. The museum has been open to the public since the purchase and is available to visitors from mid-June to mid-October and to researchers year-round by appointment.

Renovations and additions to the original building over the years has added additional space for collections. In an expansion in 2005, large galleries exhibiting the history of commercial fishing in the area, displays of antique tools, and displays concerning the life and works of famed local author Joseph Crosby Lincoln. The grounds exhibit a period herb garden and the lighthouse turret from Chatham's famous Twin Light which guided shipping from 1808 to 1923 can be accessed while the museum is open. The museum maintains a gift shop with unique gifts, books and fashion accessories that relate to the museum's collections.

The buildings are wheelchair accessible and air conditioned.
