= Isaac Morrill House =

Historial House in Massachusetts

Coordinates: 42°51′24″N 70°54′33″W

Isaac Morrill House, located at 48 Portsmouth Road in Amesbury, Massachusetts, United States, is an early New England home built around 1680 by Isaac Morrill.

Isaac was the son of the first settler Abraham Morrill. Abraham arrived in Massachusetts Bay Colony September 16, 1632 on the ship the Lyon. Captain William Pierce was the Captain of the Lyon ship. Isaac followed in his father's footsteps as a blacksmith making weapons for the army and doing great metal work for different properties and buildings. Isaac was born July 10, 1646. In the year 1670 on November 14, Issac married Phoebe Gill.

The Isaac Morrill House is located across the street from the training field. In 1789, the first President of the United States, George Washington, reviewed the troops in the training field directly across the street from the Isaac Morrill House. The training field is where the militia trained for the French and Indian Wars, also for the revolution War of 1812. Portsmouth Road was the main road between all of the towns North along the sea and of Massachusetts. Isaac and his father Abraham were members of the Ancient and Honorable Artillery Company of Massachusetts.
