= Morse House (Taunton, Massachusetts) =

Historic house in Massachusetts, United States

- U.S. National Register of Historic Places
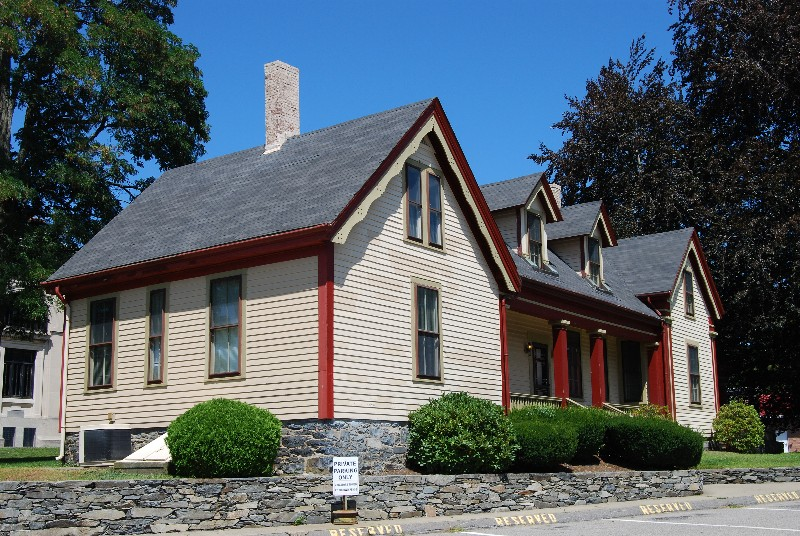

- Location within Massachusetts Location within the United States
- Location: 6 Pleasant Street, Taunton, Massachusetts
- Coordinates: 41°54′14″N 71°5′41″W
- Built: 1850
- Architectural style: Late Gothic Revival, Greek Revival
- MPS: Taunton MRA
- NRHP reference No.: 84002185
- Added to NRHP: July 5, 1984

The Morse House is a historic house located at 6 Pleasant Street in Taunton, Massachusetts.

== Description and history ==
It is a 1 1/2-story wood-frame structure, with a gable roof and clapboard siding. It is considered a fine example of Gothic Revival architecture in a cottage form, with vergeboard in the gables, and a bracketed porch. It was built in 1850. While it suffered an interior fire in 1980, it has retained much of its original wood details. The house has been converted to office space.

The house was listed on the National Register of Historic Places on July 5, 1984.

== See also ==
- National Register of Historic Places listings in Taunton, Massachusetts
