= St. Thomas Episcopal Church (Taunton, Massachusetts) =

Historic church in Massachusetts, United States

- U.S. National Register of Historic Places
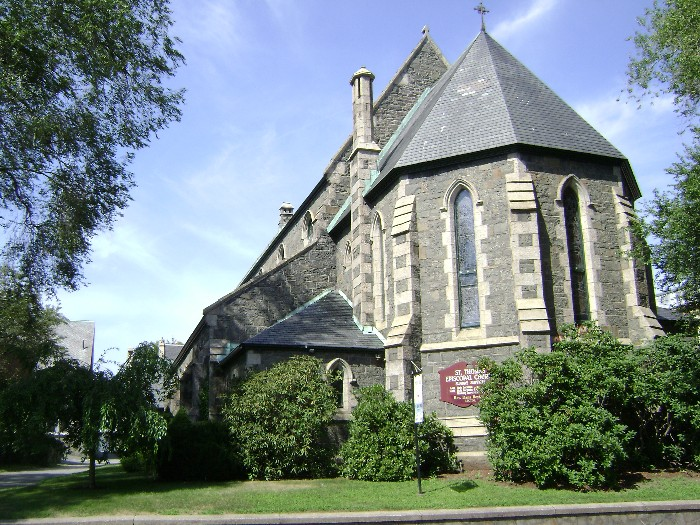

- Location within Massachusetts Location within the United States
- Location: Taunton, Massachusetts
- Coordinates: 41°53′50″N 71°5′27″W
- Built: 1858
- Architect: Upjohn, Richard
- Architectural style: Late Gothic Revival
- MPS: Taunton MRA
- NRHP reference No.: 84002213
- Added to NRHP: July 5, 1984

St. Thomas Episcopal Church is an historic church at 115 High Street in Taunton, Massachusetts, United States. Its present building, an 1857 Gothic Revival structure designed by Richard Upjohn, is listed on the National Register of Historic Places.

== History ==
The current church building was constructed in 1858 although the congregation dates back to 1728. Unlike most colonial parishes that were formed by the Society for the Gospel in Foreign Parts, Saint Thomas in Taunton was founded through the efforts of lay people living in the community. On November 30, 1728 a plot of ground was deeded for the erection of a church near the Three Mile River on what is now Tremont Street. The earliest mention of a building is contained in a letter to the Society for the Gospel in Foreign Parts, dated July 31, 1763 requesting the aid of the society in obtaining the services of a clergyman and in which it stated that for thirty years the people had a church for public worship. But the history of the parish goes back to an earlier date and to a layman, Thomas Coram, an English sea captain who erected a shipyard in 1698 on the Taunton River in what is now Dighton. The Puritans, strongly opposed to the Church of England, thwarted Coram, a loyal churchman, in his efforts to establish a parish in Taunton. Before returning to England, in a deed dated December 8, 1703, Coram left in trust with the Vestry of King's Chapel, Boston, fifty-nine acres of land that he owned with the stipulation, "that if ever hereafter the inhabitants of the town of Taunton should be more civilized than they now are, and if they should incline to have a Church of England built amongst them, or in their town, then upon application of the inhabitants of said town, that is to say, forty ratable men of them, upon their application, or petition to the said vestry, or their successors, for any suitable part of said land, to build a Church of England, or a school house for the use and service of said church."

Although the struggling church was unable to profit from Coram's bequest, the authorities of King's Chapel having sold the property in 1754 and the proceeds diverted to their own use, he presented the church with a sizable library, as well as using his influence with the Speaker of the House of Commons who gave a large Prayer Book, still prized by members of the parish. Although it is not documented in writing, it is generally assumed that the parish was given the name of Saint Thomas to honor Thomas Coram, who, in turn, bore the name of the Apostle. Thomas Cobb and Thomas Baylies headed the list of twenty-six lay persons who subscribed 528 pounds and 10 shillings for the purchase of a Glebe on March 19, 1743 "for ye sole use, benefit and profit of ye Rector of ye Church of Saint Thomas standing near Three Mile River in Taunton." A house was standing upon the Glebe and when enlarged called Coram Hall.

When efforts proved unsuccessful in obtaining the services of a clergyman, the lay people took matters into their own hands, pledged themselves to pay a salary of twenty pounds and elected John Lyon whom they sent to England to be ordained. The Rev. John Lyon, the first resident minister, began his work early in 1765, for his first baptism is recorded on February 6, 1765. In October 1766 he baptized Cloa and London, son and daughter of Cambridge and Peg, two bondservants; Peter Walker, Hellen, his wife, and Abigail Andrews being sponsors. The carefully kept records of this young man are part of the parish archives.

During the revolution, Saint Thomas, like most Episcopal Churches, fell upon hard times. The church was probably closed for a number of years as were many others in the area. The parish was not served again by a resident minister until the Rev. William W. Wheeler began his work in 1786 and continued until 1798 when he was asked to leave due to his political opinions. At a meeting on August 6, 1798 the parish voted among other things, that the church wardens should notify Mr. Wheeler that the said Society would have no further service for him as minister of said Society; that the church wardens should go and demand the Library (Coram) and the records belonging to the church; that the church wardens should demand possession of the Glebe and make a settlement with Mr. Wheeler.

Following this unfortunate incident, the parish suffered further loss when the church blew down in the gale of 1815. During this period of time occasional services were held by supply clergy from Rhode Island, but Annual Meetings were held regularly, the records of which are still in the possession of the church.

It was not until 1824 that we have evidence of new life stirring when on June 27 a meeting was called with Ichabod Leonard as moderator and William A. Crocker as clerk in which it was voted that a committee be appointed "to enquire whether it be expedient to undertake the erection of a Church in Taunton for the use of the Episcopal Church and Society.. and to ascertain and report the number and names of those who are disposed to unite with the Society". The successful work and report of this committee consisted of Galen Hicks, Honorable Francis Baylies, Honorable James L. Hodges, John West, Esquire, David G.W. Cobb, Esquire and William A. Crocker and led eventually to the selling of the Glebe (August 6, 1828), purchasing a lot on High Street on which was built a new church costing $7,500 and calling the Rev. John West, the son of a prominent citizen, as rector. Bishop Griswold consecrated the church on June 19, 1829.

The church, now located nearer to the center of town, grew rapidly, leading to the enlargement of the building and adding twenty pews by December, 1840 so that the vestry was able to report to the parish at the Annual Meeting in April, 1841, "our church has become fully established, that it has surmounted most of the obstacles which have heretofore checked its progress, that the prejudices so generously existing against it in this section are rapidly passing away, and that no contingency can happen with a continuance of God's blessing to inflict upon her any permanent or serious injury."

The middle of the 19th century was an era of great church expansion and building throughout New England; Taunton was no exception. The second church was moved across the street and the present stone structure was consecrated by Bishop Manton Eastburn on March 3, 1859, the cornerstone having been laid on June 15, 1857.

== See also ==
- National Register of Historic Places listings in Taunton, Massachusetts
