= Isaac Crocker Homestead =

Historic home and farm in Massachusetts, United States

Coordinates: 41.665353°N 70.435586°W

- Location within Massachusetts

History
- Built: c. 1750

Site notes
- Area: 2.6 ha (6.4 acres)
- Architectural style: Cape Cod style

The Isaac Crocker Homestead is a historic home and farm in Marstons Mills, Massachusetts, United States, built c. 1750. The 6.5-acre (2.6 ha) property, located at 330 Olde Homestead Drive, includes an historic house, adjoining barn and grain silo. The silo is unusual for being made out of wood. In 2007, the property was listed as one of the Ten Most Endangered Historic Resources in Massachusetts.

The house is a Cape Cod-style cottage that was described in 2006 as the oldest example of the architectural style in that area of the town of Barnstable. The property has been deemed to be eligible for inclusion on the National Register of Historic Places.

== History ==
The homestead was operated as a farm from the 1750s to 2006, when the owner died. After being threatened by a previous owner who wanted to tear down the house and build a new one on the nearby pond, the community rallied around the town historical commission and the owner sold the land and house to Cape Abilities, a nonprofit organization that helps provide jobs and housing to those with disabilities.

In 2016, in need of major repairs, the historic farm was purchased from Cape Abilities by Dr. Joan Elizabeth Fand, a practicing anesthesiologist and beekeeper from Brookline, Massachusetts. In an effort to preserve the historic nature of the farm, the original home and barn were restored. The original (ca 1905) wood hoop silo was also saved. The farm, previously used for hay bailing, cattle rearing, hydroponics, and blueberries, is currently used to grow crops for the benefit of pollinators at risk including honeybees.
