= Samuel Gaut House =

Historic house in Massachusetts, United States

- U.S. National Register of Historic Places
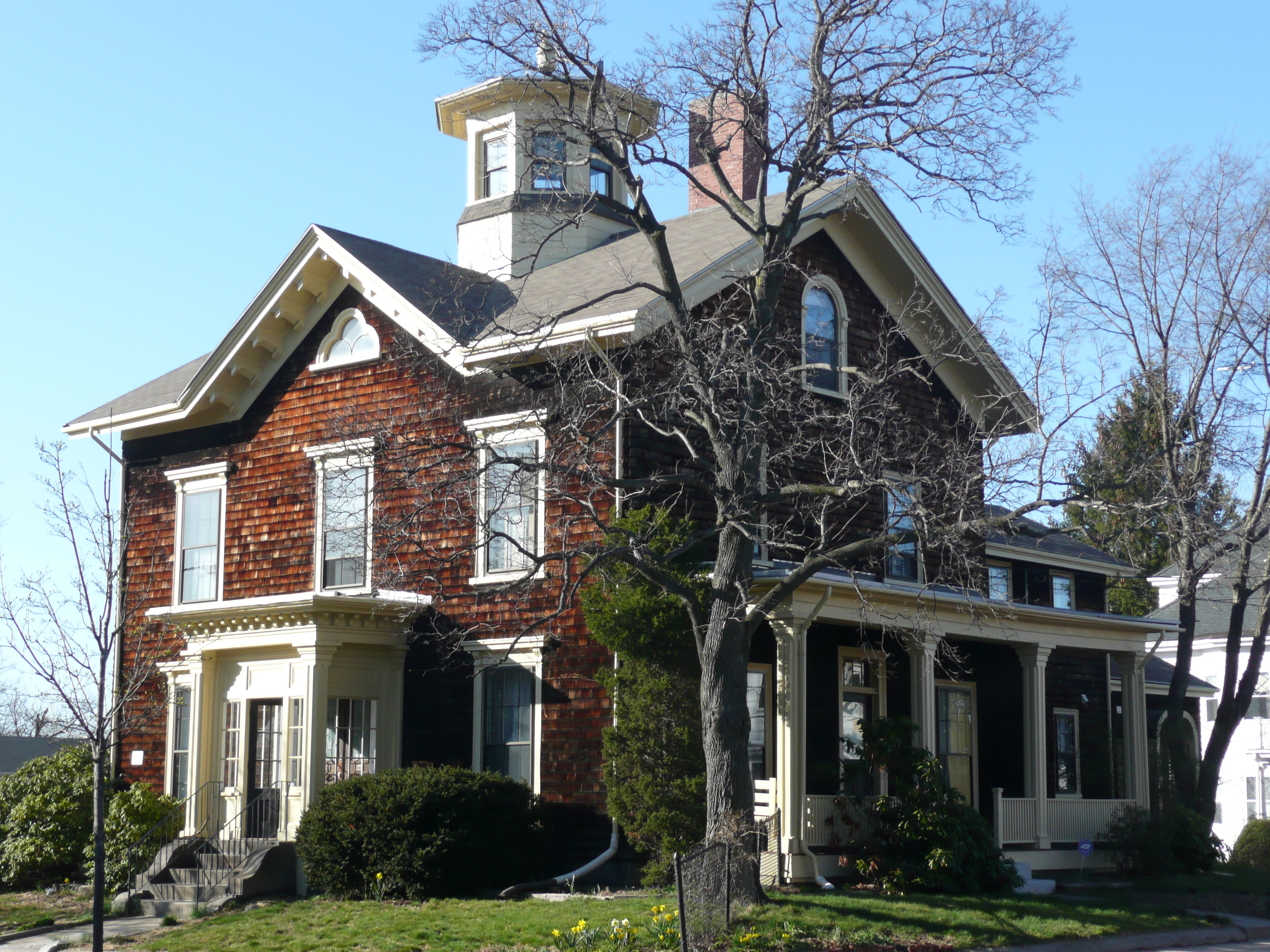
- View of Samuel Gaut House from Highland Avenue

- Location within Massachusetts Location within the United States
- Location: 137 Highland Avenue, Somerville, Massachusetts
- Coordinates: 42°23′17.30″N 71°6′7.20″W
- Built: 1855
- Architectural style: Italianate
- MPS: Somerville MPS
- NRHP reference No.: 89001265
- Added to NRHP: September 18, 1989

The Samuel Gaut House is a historic house in Somerville, Massachusetts. The 2 1/2-story wood-frame house was built c. 1855 for Samuel Gaut, a baker, and is a well-preserved example of a typical Italianate house. It is three bays wide with a typical Italianate center gable, which is studded with brackets and has a trefoil window in the peak. The side gables have round-arch windows, and the building is topped by an octagonal cupola with a belled finial.

The house was listed on the National Register of Historic Places in 1989.

== Gallery ==
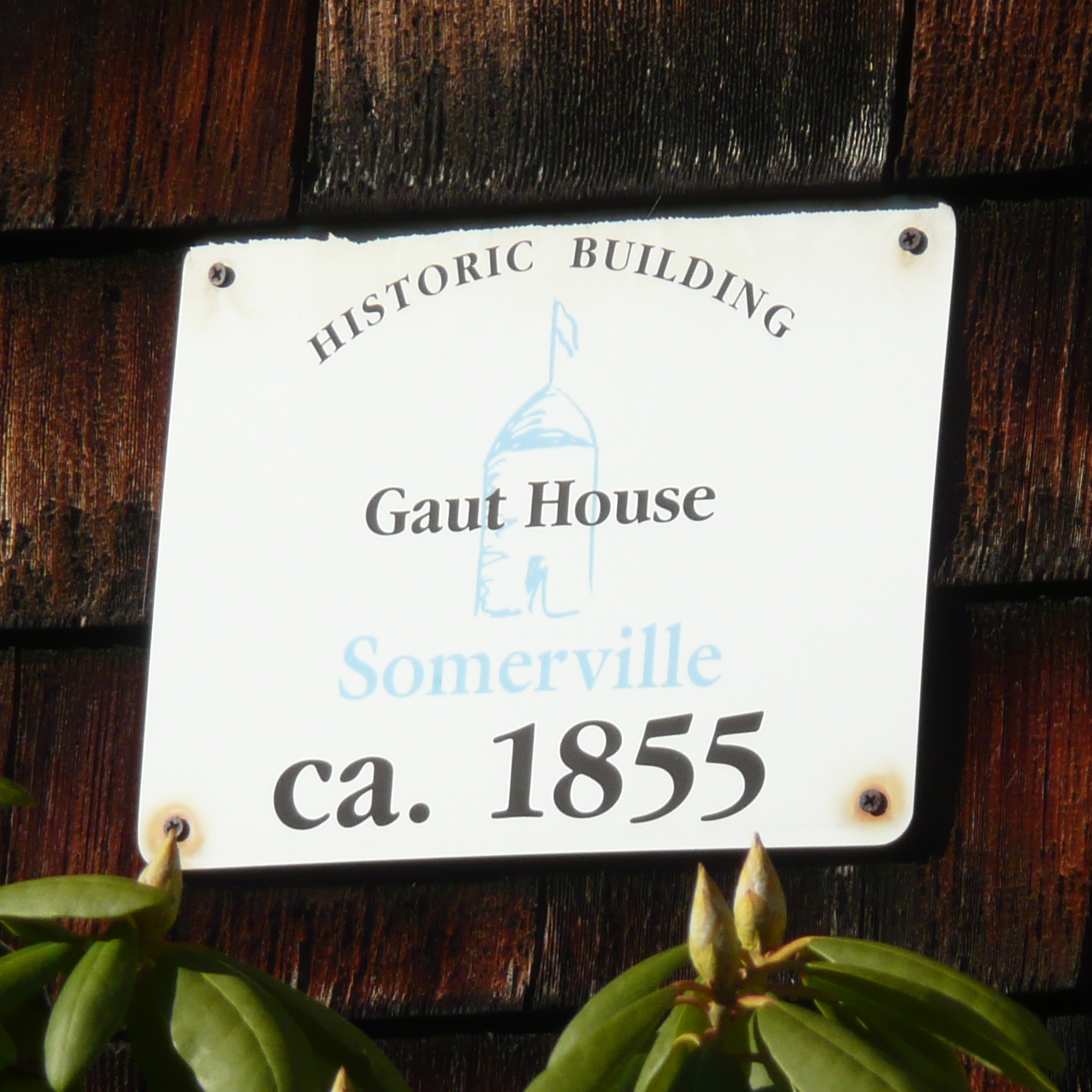
The identifying sign on the face of the Samuel Gaut House

== See also ==
- National Register of Historic Places listings in Somerville, Massachusetts
