= Joseph Stone House =

Historic house in Massachusetts, United States

- U.S. National Register of Historic Places
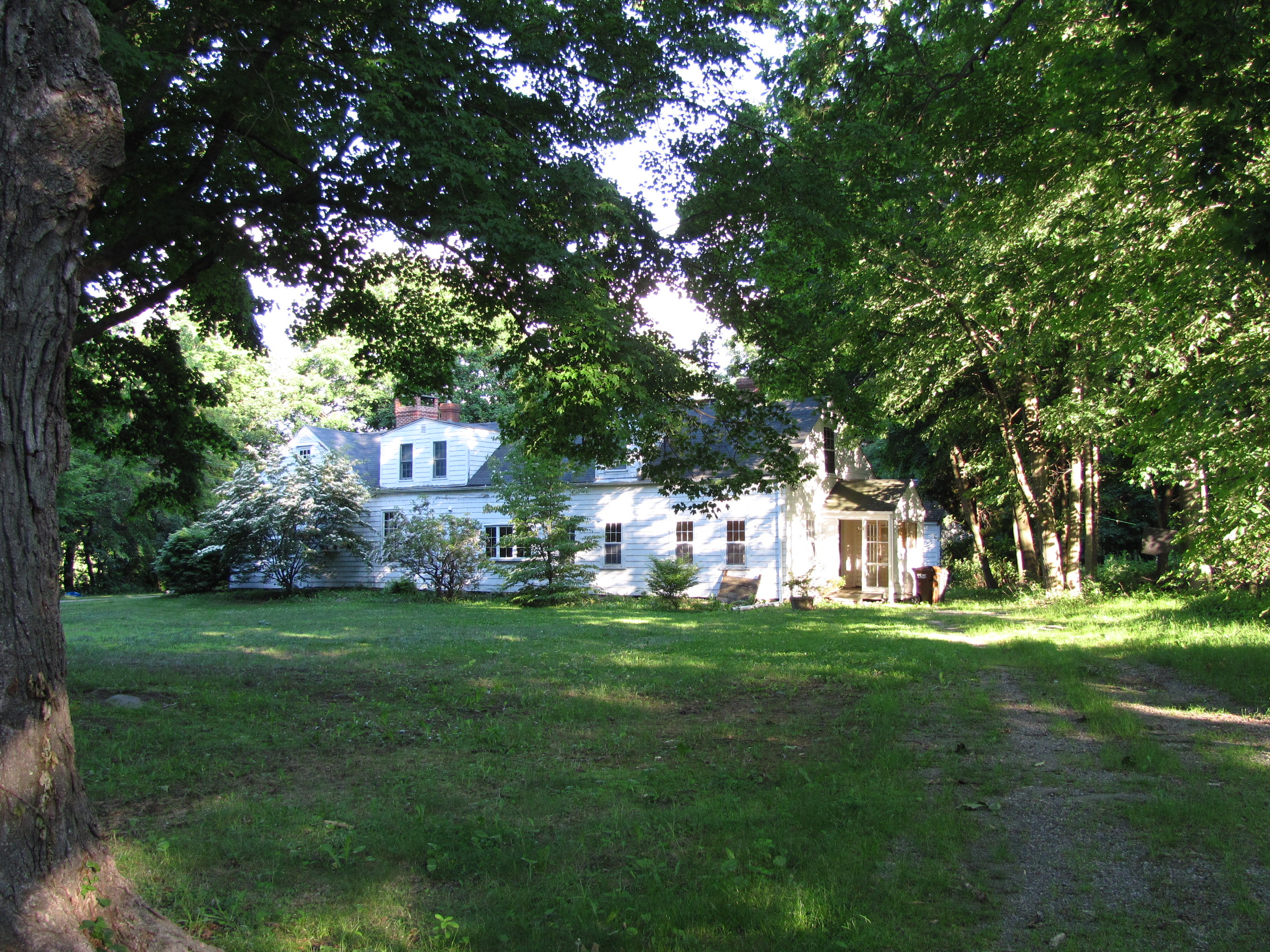

- Location within Massachusetts Location within the United States
- Location: Auburn, Massachusetts
- Coordinates: 42°11′7″N 71°49′51″W
- Built: 1729
- NRHP reference No.: 86000028
- Added to NRHP: January 9, 1986

The Joseph Stone House, also known as Potter Acres, is an historic First Period house at 35 Stone Street in Auburn, Massachusetts. The oldest portion of this 1 1/2-story timber-frame house, its north side, three bays and chimney, was built in 1729. The southern two bays were added in 1790, and a rear leanto may have been added at the same time. In 1886 the rear ell underwent significant alteration, and was again enlarged in 1946. The main body of the house has retained its original woodwork and interior decoration. Its most notable owner was Joseph Stone, a composer of music for sacred texts, who lived here between 1785 and 1826. The house was listed on the National Register of Historic Places in 1986.

== See also ==
- National Register of Historic Places listings in Worcester County, Massachusetts
