= Federal Street District =

Historic district in Massachusetts, United States

- U.S. National Register of Historic Places
- U.S. Historic district
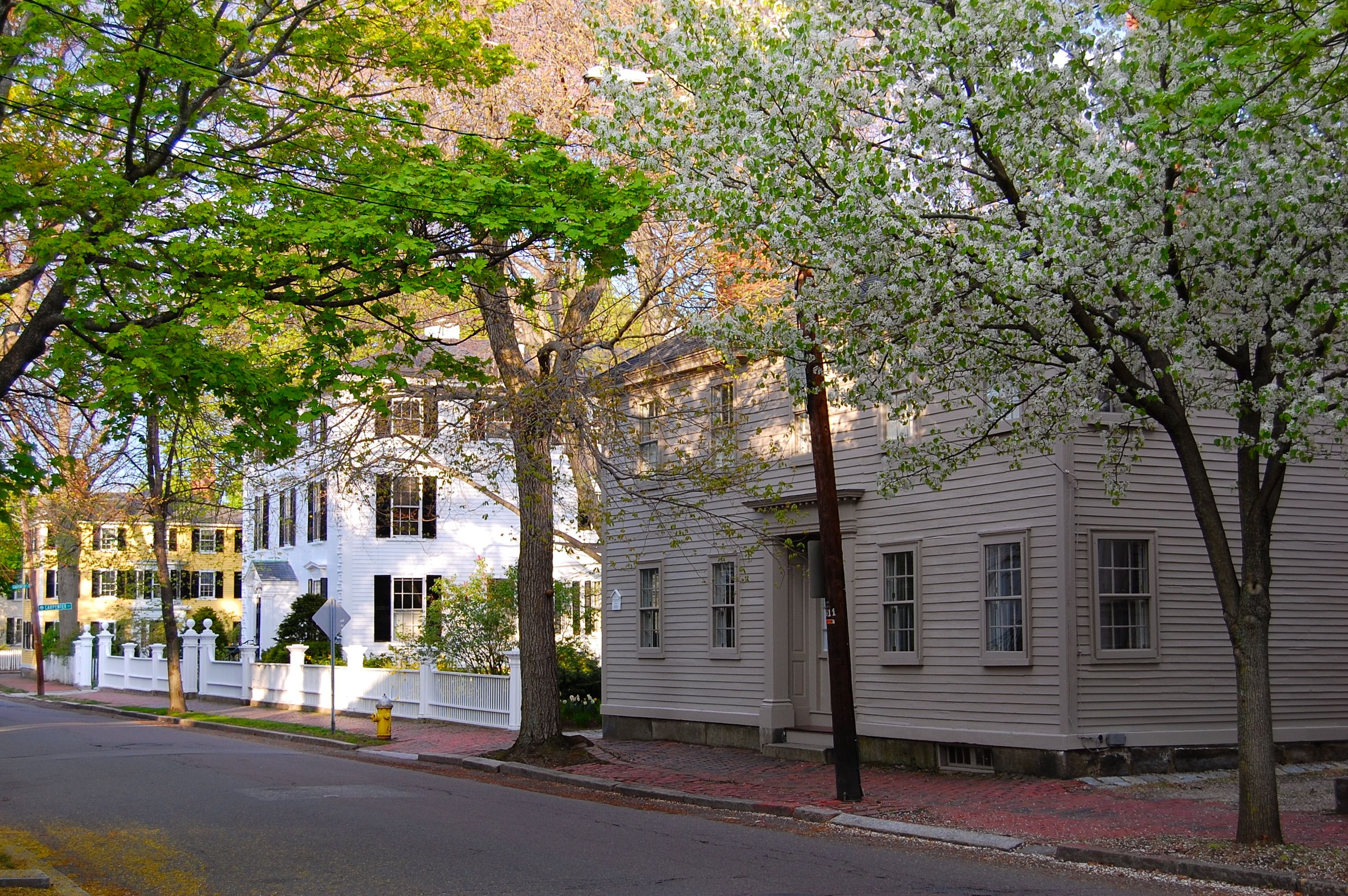
- Historic homes in the Federal Street District

- Location within Massachusetts Location within the United States
- Location: Salem, Massachusetts
- Coordinates: 42°31′22″N 70°53′52″W
- Architectural style: Early Republic, Late Victorian
- MPS: Downtown Salem MRA
- NRHP reference No.: 76000299 (original); 83000576 (increase)

Significant dates
- Added to NRHP: May 17, 1976
- Boundary increase: September 16, 1983

The Federal Street District is a residential and civic historic district in Salem, Massachusetts, United States. It is an expansion of an earlier listing of the Essex County Court Buildings on the National Register of Historic Places in 1976. In addition to the former county court buildings included in the earlier listing, the district expansion in 1983 encompasses the entire block of Federal Street between Washington and North Streets. It includes buildings from 32 to 65 Federal Street, as well as the Tabernacle Church at 50 Washington Street.

The original court was built in 1785. The Old Granite Courthouse, also known as the County Commissioner's Building, was built in 1841 in the Greek Revival architectural style. Adjacent to that is the Superior Court, pictured below. Built in 1862, the Superior Court is an Italianate structure that was later remodeled into the Richardsonian Romanesque style of architecture. A large new court has been constructed down the street.

Most of the residential properties on this block of Federal Street were built between 1810 and 1900. The notable exception is #47, which is a Georgian gambrel-roofed house built in the second half of the 18th century. Most of the houses are either Italianate or Second Empire in their styling; there is one Colonial Revival house, #62, built 1900. The Tabernacle Church, which abuts Federal Street but faces Washington Street, is a Georgian Revival structure built in 1923.

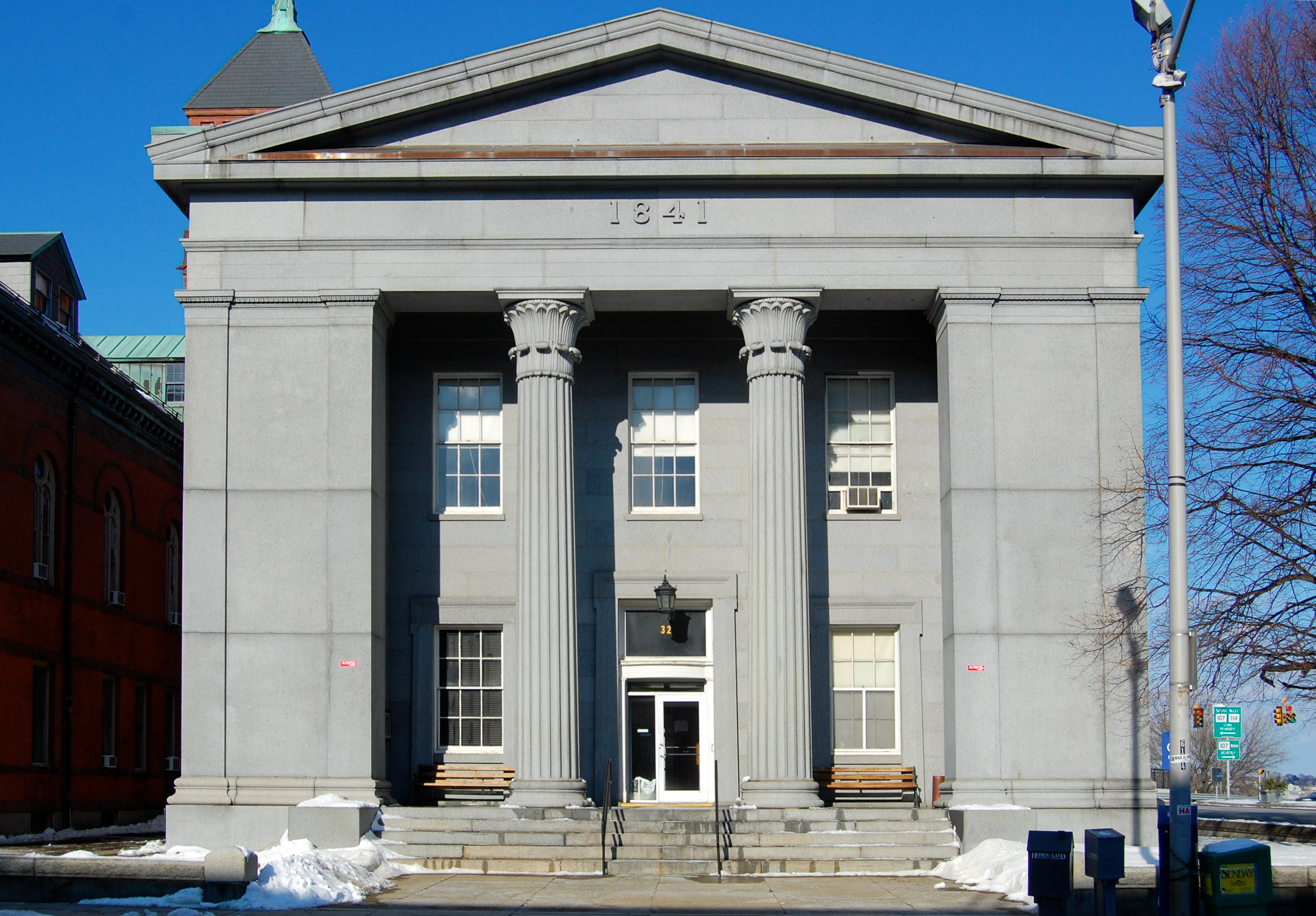
Old Granite Courthouse (c. 1841)

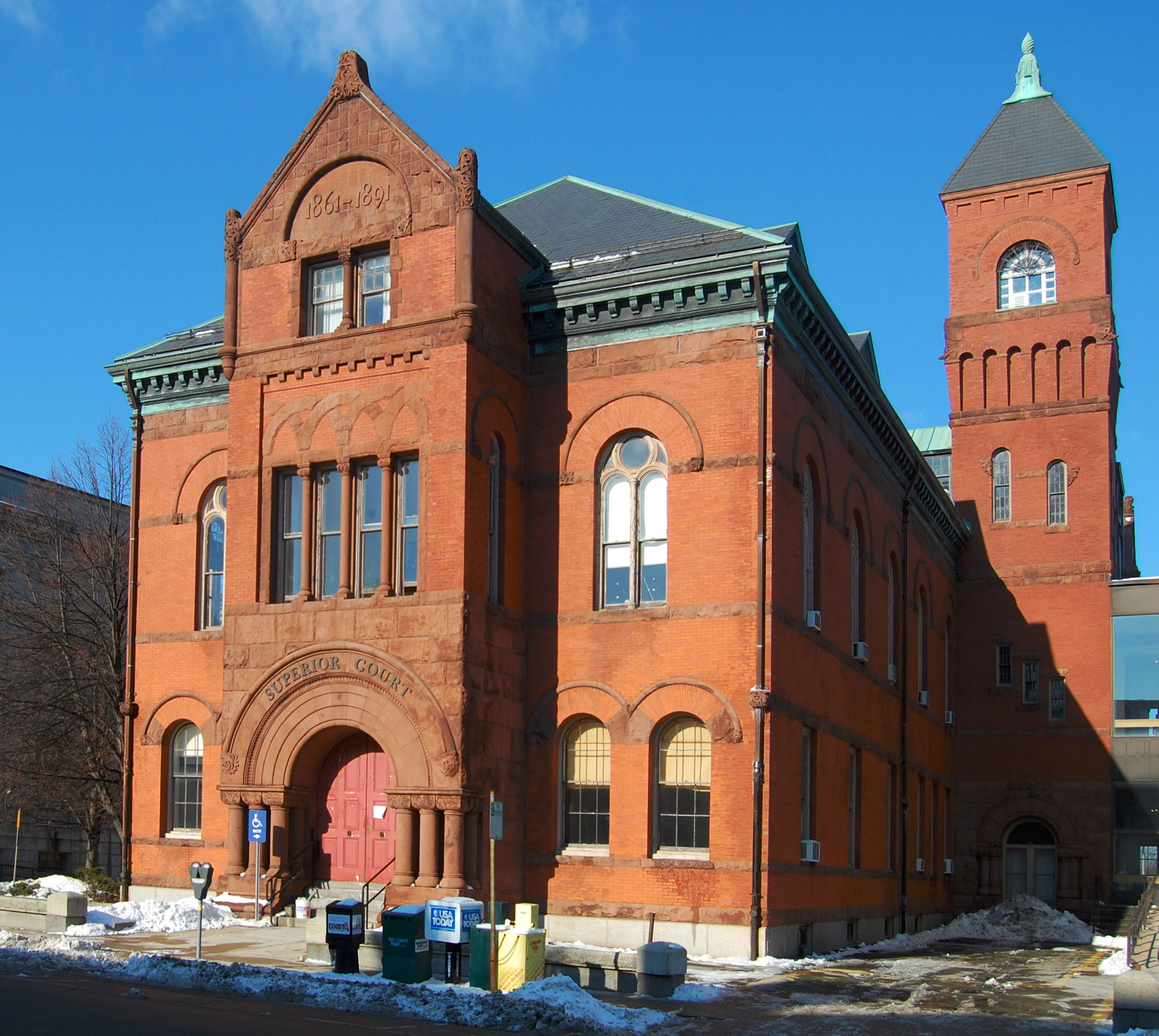
Superior Court (1889)

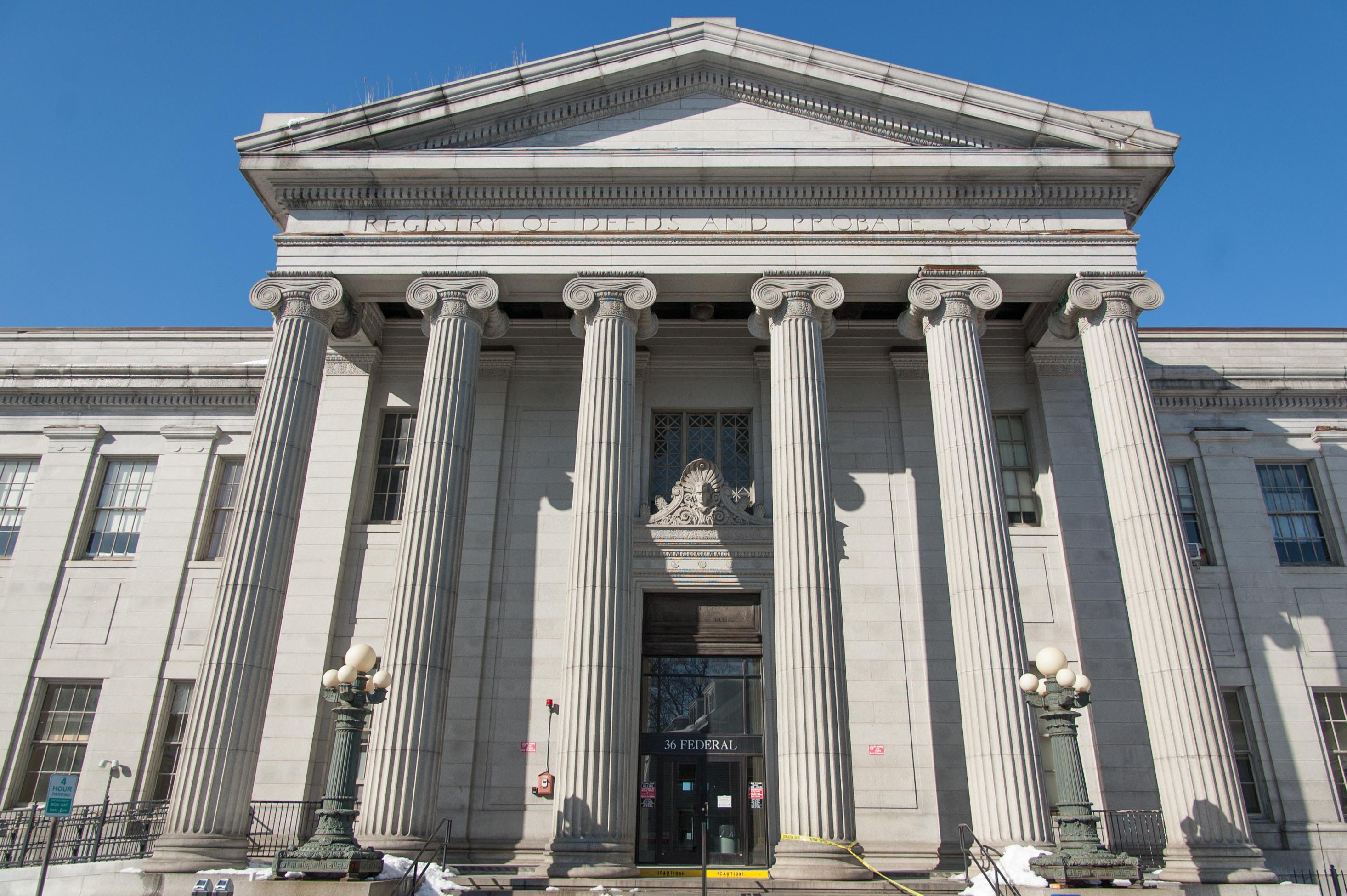
Registry of Deeds (1909)

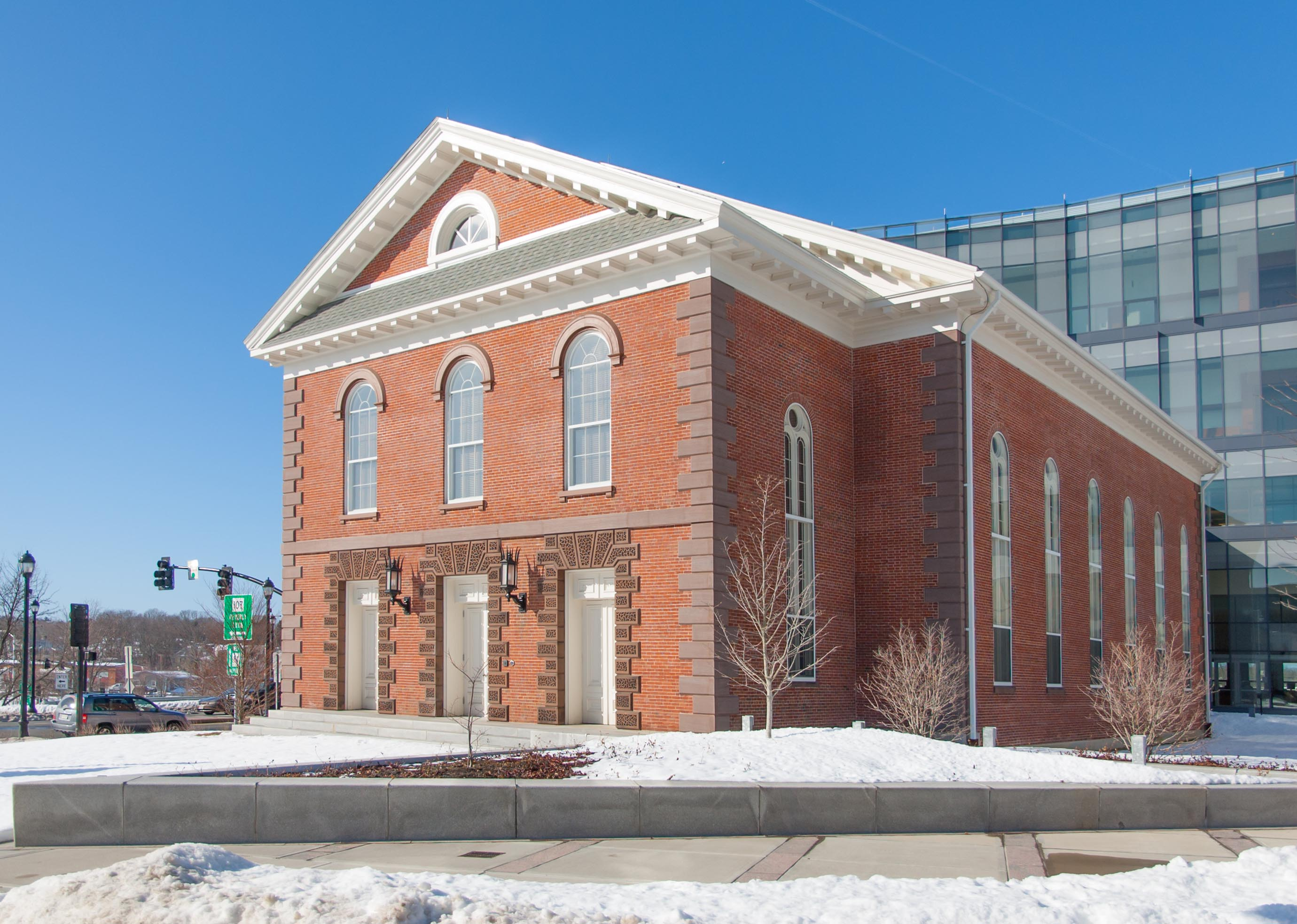
New law library converted from a Baptist church (1806)

== See also ==
- National Register of Historic Places listings in Salem, Massachusetts
- List of historic houses in Massachusetts
