= List of museums in Massachusetts =

This list of museums in Massachusetts is a list of museums, defined for this context as institutions (including nonprofit organizations, government entities, and private businesses) that collect and care for objects of cultural, artistic, scientific, or historical interest and make their collections or related exhibits available for public viewing. Museums that exist only in cyberspace (i.e., virtual museums) are not included. Also included are non-profit art and university art galleries.

== Museums ==
Name	Town/City	County	Region	Type	Notes
1749 Court House and Museum	Plymouth	Plymouth	Plymouth	Local history	Early Plymouth history, open seasonally
Abbot Hall	Marblehead	Essex	North Shore	Maritime	Operated by the Marblehead Historical Commission, includes cases with local history displays and the Maritime Room Museum
Abigail Adams Birthplace	Weymouth	Norfolk	Greater Boston	Historic house	website
Adams National Historical Park	Quincy	Norfolk	Greater Boston	Historic house	Preserves the homes of Presidents John Adams and John Quincy Adams, of U.S. Ambassador to Great Britain Charles Francis Adams Sr., and of the writers and historians Henry Adams and Brooks Adams house
Addison Gallery of American Art	Andover	Essex	Merrimack Valley	Art	American art, photography and decorative arts, part of Phillips Academy
African Meeting House on Nantucket	Nantucket	Nantucket	Nantucket	African American	website, part of Museum of Afro-American History
Agawam Historical Fire House & Museum	Agawam	Hampden	Pioneer Valley	Fire	website
Alden House Historic Site	Duxbury	Plymouth	Plymouth	Historic house	National Historic Landmark; Includes 1659 John Alden House and 1632 original Alden Homestead
Amazing World of Dr. Seuss Museum	Springfield	Hampden	Pioneer Valley	Children's	Dedicated to the art of Dr. Seuss, opened in 2017
Amelia Park Children's Museum	Westfield	Hampden	Pioneer Valley	Children's	website, formerly Discover Westfield Children's Museum
American Heritage Museum	Stow	Middlesex	Greater Boston	Military history	website, large collection of tanks and other military artifacts of the 20th and early 21st centuries
Amesbury Carriage Museum	Amesbury	Essex	Merrimack Valley	Transportation	website
Amherst Center for Russian Culture	Amherst	Hampshire	Pioneer Valley	Art	Includes gallery for the display of over 50 works of Russian art
Amherst History Museum	Amherst	Hampshire	Pioneer Valley	History	Operated by the Amherst Historical Society in the Simeon Strong House, includes decorative arts, paintings, household implements, agricultural tools and other historic items
Amos Blanchard House and Barn Museum	Andover	Essex	Merrimack Valley	History	website, recreates the life and times of a typical middle-class family of the early 19th century, operated by the Andover Historical Society
Aptucxet Trading Post Museum	Bourne	Barnstable	Cape Cod	Open air	website, operated by the Bourne Historical Society, includes replica 17th-century trading post, Gray Gables Railroad Station, replica 19th-century saltworks, and a wooden windmill
Aquinnah Cultural Center	Aquinnah	Dukes	Martha's Vineyard	Native American	History and culture of the Wampanoag Tribe of Gay Head
Armenian Library and Museum of America	Watertown	Middlesex	Greater Boston	Ethnic	
Arrowhead	Pittsfield	Berkshire	The Berkshires	Historic house	Home of Herman Melville
Art Complex Museum	Duxbury	Plymouth	Plymouth	Art	Collections include American painting, prints, Shaker furniture and Asian art
Arthur M. Sackler Museum	Cambridge	Middlesex	Greater Boston	Art	Part of Harvard, ancient, Islamic, Asian, and later Indian art
Ashfield Historical Society Museum	Ashfield	Franklin	Pioneer Valley	Local history	website
Athol Historical Society Museum	Athol	Worcester	Blackstone Valley	Local history	Open on Sunday afternoons in June and July
Attic Children's Museum	Uxbridge	Worcester	Blackstone Valley	Children's	website, operated by Uxbridge Public Schools
Attleboro Arts Museum	Attleboro	Bristol	Southeastern Massachusetts	Art	website, contemporary visual and performing arts
Attleboro Area Industrial Museum	Attleboro	Bristol	Southeastern Massachusetts	Industry	website, refiner of gold, silver and copper by-products for jewelry
Atwood House Museum	Chatham	Barnstable	Cape Cod	Historic house	18th-century house reflecting Cape Cod life, art, and culture of the 18th and 19th centuries, run by the Chatham Historical Society
Auburn Historical Museum	Auburn	Worcester	Blackstone Valley	Local history	Housed in a historic school building
Bare Cove Fire Museum	Hingham	Plymouth	Plymouth	Fire	website
Barrett-Byam Homestead	Chelmsford	Middlesex	Merrimack Valley	Historic house	Operated by the Chelmsford Historical Society
Bartlett Museum	Amesbury	Essex	Merrimack Valley	Multiple	Historic house with Amesbury history exhibits, replicas of a colonial kitchen and a Victorian parlor, a natural history room, a schoolroom and a carriage house
Bartholomew's Cobble	Sheffield	Berkshire	The Berkshires	Natural history	
Basketball Hall of Fame	Springfield	Hampden	Pioneer Valley	Sports	
Battleship Cove	Fall River	Bristol	Southeastern Massachusetts	Maritime	Includes the World War II battleship USS Massachusetts, PT Boat Museum, destroyer USS Joseph P. Kennedy Jr., submarine USS Lionfish, German corvette Hiddensee
Baxter Mill	Yarmouth	Barnstable	Cape Cod	Mill	Restored grist mill, open seasonally
Beauport, Sleeper-McCann House	Gloucester	Essex	North Shore	Historic house	Owned by Historic New England, early 20th-century house with dozens of rooms decorated to evoke different historical and literary themes
Beebe Estate	Melrose	Middlesex	Greater Boston	Art	Features changing exhibits of local art
Beer Can Museum	East Taunton	Bristol	Southeastern Massachusetts	Collection	Beer cans
Belchertown Firefighters Museum	Belchertown	Hampshire	Pioneer Valley	Firefighting	
Bell School	Westport	Bristol	Southeastern Massachusetts	Local history	website, operated by the Westport Historical Society
Beneski Museum of Natural History	Amherst	Hampshire	Pioneer Valley	Natural history	Part of Amherst College, large collection of dinosaur fossils, area minerals
Benjamin Caryl House	Dover	Norfolk	Greater Boston	Historic house	Operated by the Dover Historical Society, which also owns the Sawin Museum and Fisher Barn, late 18th-century period house
Benjamin Nye Homestead	East Sandwich	Barnstable	Cape Cod	Historic house	18th-century period home
Benjamin Thompson House-Count Rumford Birthplace	Woburn	Middlesex	Greater Boston	Historic house	Birthplace of scientist and inventor Benjamin Thompson
Berkshire Athenaeum	Pittsfield	Berkshire	The Berkshires	Library	Library, literary, Herman Melville Collection
Berkshire Museum	Pittsfield	Berkshire	The Berkshires	Multiple	Art, natural history, culture of ancient civilizations, science, aquarium
Berkshire Scenic Railway Museum	Lenox	Berkshire	The Berkshires	Railroad	Museum and heritage railroad
Bernardston Historical Society Museum	Bernardston	Franklin	Pioneer Valley	Local history	
Bidwell House Museum	Monterey	Berkshire	The Berkshires	Historic house	18th-century period house, also has hiking trails
Bisbee Mill Museum	Chesterfield	Hampshire	Pioneer Valley	History	Reconstructed 19th-century grist mill, blacksmith shop, woodworking shop, historic artifacts
Blackstone Historical Museum	Blackstone	Worcester	Blackstone Valley	Local history	
Blanchard's Colonial Tavern	Avon	Norfolk	Southeastern Massachusetts	Historic house	website, 18th-century tavern, also Captain Sam Robbins House
Blue Hill Observatory & Science Center	Milton	Norfolk	Greater Boston	Science	
Blue Hills Trailside Museum	Milton	Norfolk	Greater Boston	Nature center	Operated by the Massachusetts Audubon Society, natural history of the Blue Hills Reservation, live animals, programs
Boardman House	Saugus	Essex	North Shore	Historic house	Owned by Historic New England, open two days a year, late 17th-century saltbox
Boylston Historical Society Museum	Boylston	Worcester	Blackstone Valley	Local history	website, located in the former town hall
Brewster Historical Society Museum	Brewster	Barnstable	Cape Cod	Local history	website
Briggs-McDermott House	Bourne	Barnstable	Cape Cod	Local history	Operated by the Bourne Historical Society
Brockton Historical Society Homestead	Brockton	Plymouth	Plymouth	History	website, also see Brockton Historical Society other site, includes the Brockton Shoe Museum, Brockton Fire Museum, Rocky Marciano and Thomas Edison exhibits
Brocklebank Museum	Georgetown	Essex	Merrimack Valley	Historic house	18th-century period house operated by the Georgetown Historical Society
Brooks Academy Museum	Harwich	Barnstable	Cape Cod	Local history	website, operated by the Harwich Historical Society
Brooks Estate	Medford	Middlesex	Greater Boston	Historic house	Victorian manor and carriage house
Browne House	Watertown	Middlesex	Greater Boston	Historic house	Open twice a year
Buckland Historical Society Museum	Buckland	Franklin	Pioneer Valley	Local history	website, open on a limited basis
Buckman Tavern	Lexington	Middlesex	Greater Boston	Tavern	18th-century tavern
Bullard House	Berlin	Worcester	Blackstone Valley	Historic house	Open by the Berlin Art and Historical Society for special events
Burlington Historic Museum	Burlington	Middlesex	Greater Boston	Local history	website, operated by the Burlington Historical Commission
Busch-Reisinger Museum	Cambridge	Middlesex	Greater Boston	Art	Part of Harvard, art of Northern and Central Europe, focusing on German-speaking cultures
Buttonwoods Museum	Haverhill	Essex	Merrimack Valley	History	Operated by the Haverhill Historical Society, includes John Ward House, the Duncan House and the Daniel Hunkins Shoe Shop, collections include furniture, ceramics, clothing, photographs, paintings, tools, banners, books, documents and Native American artifacts
Cahoon Museum of American Art	Cotuit	Barnstable	Cape Cod	Art	American art
Calvin Coolidge Presidential Library & Museum	Northampton	Hampshire	Pioneer Valley	Biographical	
Cape Ann Museum	Gloucester	Essex	North Shore	Multiple	Fisheries & maritime, fine art, granite quarrying & decorative arts galleries
Cape Cod Children's Museum	Mashpee	Barnstable	Cape Cod	Children's	website
Cape Cod Museum of Art	Dennis	Barnstable	Cape Cod	Art	Collection of artists with regional association
Cape Cod Museum of Natural History	Brewster	Barnstable	Cape Cod	Natural history	Bird and wildlife mounts, Native American displays, aquariums, marsh trails
Captain Bangs Hallet House	Yarmouth	Barnstable	Cape Cod	Historic house	website, 19th-century period house, operated by the Historical Society of Old Yarmouth
Captain John Wilson House	Cohasset	Norfolk	Greater Boston	Historic house	19th-century period house operated in the summer by the Cohasset Historical Society
Carpenter Museum	Rehoboth	Bristol	Southeastern Massachusetts	Local history	Collections of the Rehoboth Antiquarian Society
Castle Hill	Ipswich	Essex	North Shore	Historic house	59-room Stuart-style mansion and extensive grounds
Centerville Historical Museum	Centerville	Barnstable	Cape Cod	Local history	website, includes an 1840 house with historic costumes, maritime and military artifacts, quilts, 18th- and 19th-century decorative arts, paintings, tools, and children's toys and dolls
Charles River Museum of Industry	Waltham	Middlesex	Greater Boston	Industry	Area textile and watch industries, steam power, early transportation, recreated early 20th-century machine shop, antique machines
Chatham Marconi Maritime Center	Chatham	Barnstable	Cape Cod	History	History of maritime wireless communication
Chatham Railroad Museum	Chatham	Barnstable	Cape Cod	Transportation	1887 railroad depot, features New York Central model locomotives used at the 1939 New York World's Fair, HO model railroad
Chesterwood Estate & Museum	Stockbridge	Berkshire	The Berkshires	Historic house	Home of sculptor Daniel Chester French
Children's Museum at Holyoke	Holyoke	Hampden	Pioneer Valley	Children's	website
Children's Museum in Easton	Easton	Bristol	Southeastern Massachusetts	Children's	
Claflin-Richards House	Wenham	Essex	North Shore	Historic house	Owned by Wenham Museum, open by appointment
Clara Barton Birthplace Museum	North Oxford	Worcester	Blackstone Valley	Biographical	19th-century home of Clara Barton, founder of the Red Cross
Clara Sexton House	Billerica	Middlesex	Merrimack Valley	Historic house	website, operated by the Billerica Historical Society
Clark Art Institute	Williamstown	Berkshire	The Berkshires	Art	Also known as Sterling and Francine Clark Art Institute
Clinton Historical Society Museum	Clinton	Worcester	North County	Historic house	website, open on Saturday morning by tour
Coast Guard Heritage Museum	Barnstable	Barnstable	Cape Cod	Maritime	History of the United States Coast Guard and its predecessor organizations, includes the Old Jail
Codman House	Lincoln	Middlesex	Greater Boston	Historic house	Owned by Historic New England, estate with furnishings from many periods, also gardens
Coffin House	Newbury	Essex	Merrimack Valley	Historic house	Owned by Historic New England, Colonial American house
Cogswell's Grant	Essex	Essex	North Shore	Historic house	Owned by Historic New England, 18th-century farmhouse with collection of American decorative arts
Cohasset Historical Society Museum	Cohasset	Norfolk	Greater Boston	Local history	Features textile collection, 19th-century furniture and decorative arts, ephemera capturing Cohasset's theatrical past and paintings depicting the town's seascapes, landscapes, people and places
Cohasset Maritime Museum	Cohasset	Norfolk	Greater Boston	Maritime	Operated in the summer by the Cohasset Historical Society
Concord Museum	Concord	Middlesex	Greater Boston	Local history	Includes collection of artifacts from authors Ralph Waldo Emerson and Henry David Thoreau, 17th, 18th, and 19th-century decorative arts
Cooper-Frost-Austin House	Cambridge	Middlesex	Greater Boston	Historic house	Owned by Historic New England, 17th-century Colonial American house, open twice a year
Cottage Museum	Oak Bluffs	Dukes	Martha's Vineyard	Religious	website, typical Campground cottage, operated by the Martha's Vineyard Campmeeting Association
Crane Museum of Papermaking	Dalton	Berkshire	The Berkshires	Industry	Paper-making and the history of Crane & Co.
Crowninshield-Bentley House	Salem	Essex	North Shore	Historic house	Owned by the Peabody Essex Museum, restored 1794 period Colonial house
Crosby Mansion	Brewster	Barnstable	Cape Cod	Historic house	website, late 19th-century mansion open for tours on specific dates
Cushing House Museum and Garden	Newburyport	Essex	Merrimack Valley	Historic house	19th-century Federal mansion with collection of decorative arts
Custom House Maritime Museum	Newburyport	Essex	Merrimack Valley	Maritime	Operated by the Newburyport Maritime Society, maritime heritage of the Merrimack Valley and its role in American history
Cyrus E. Dallin Art Museum	Arlington	Middlesex	Greater Boston	Art	Many works by sculptor Cyrus Edwin Dallin
Danforth Art	Framingham	Middlesex	Greater Boston	Art	Collection of American art, changing exhibits of contemporary artists, classes and workshops
Dan Raymond House	Sheffield	Berkshire	The Berkshires	Historic house	website, operated by the Sheffield Historical Society
Danvers Historical Society	Danvers	Essex	North Shore	History	website, operates Page House, Tapley Memorial Hall, Glen Magna Farms and General Israel Putnam House
Davis Museum and Cultural Center	Wellesley	Norfolk	Greater Boston	Art	Part of Wellesley College, collections include ancient to contemporary sculptures, paintings, decorative objects, and works on paper
DeCordova Museum and Sculpture Park	Lincoln	Middlesex	Greater Boston	Art	Modern and contemporary art, American sculpture and 35-acre (140,000 m^{2}) sculpture park
Dedham Historical Society Museum	Dedham	Norfolk	Greater Boston	History	website, features collection of Dedham and Chelsea pottery, furnishings, Civil War artifacts and a number of important paintings
Discovery Museums	Acton	Middlesex	Greater Boston	Children's, Science	Two museums in separate facilities, Children's Discovery Museum and Science Discovery Museum
Dole-Little House	Newbury	Essex	Merrimack Valley	Historic house	Operated by Historic New England, 18th-century house
Dwight-Derby House	Medfield	Norfolk	Greater Boston	Historic house	Open by appointment, 17th-century house
East Brookfield Historical Museum	East Brookfield	Worcester	Blackstone Valley	History	website, operated by the East Brookfield Historical Commission in the Hodgkins School
Eastham Windmill	Eastham	Barnstable	Cape Cod	Mill	Windmill dating back to the late 17th century
Easthampton Historical Society Museum	Easthampton	Hampshire	Pioneer Valley	History	information
EcoTarium	Worcester	Worcester	Blackstone Valley	Multiple	Natural history, science, live animals
Edmund Fowle House and Museum	Watertown	Middlesex	Greater Boston	History	Operated by the Historical Society of Watertown,
Edward Gorey House	Yarmouth	Barnstable	Cape Cod	Historic house	Also known as Elephant House, home of illustrator Edward Gorey
Edward Devotion House	Brookline	Norfolk	Greater Boston	Historic house	Museum and home to the Brookline Historical Society, features 18th- and 19th-century furnishings and Brookline-related artifacts
Edwards Memorial Museum	Chesterfield	Hampshire	Pioneer Valley	History	website, operated by the Chesterfield Historical Society
Eleanor Cabot Bradley Estate	Canton	Norfolk	Greater Boston	Historic house	1902 country house and garden belonging to the Cabot family
Elizabeth Cassidy Folk Art Museum	Peabody	Essex	North Shore	Art	website, operated by the Peabody Historical Society in the Osborne-Salata House, permanent and rotating folk art exhibits including architectural embellishments, funerary art, pottery, portraits and needlework
Emily Dickinson Museum	Amherst	Hampshire	Pioneer Valley	Historic house	Birthplace of 19th-century American poet Emily Dickinson and adjacent home of her brother, lawyer William Austin Dickinson
E. N. Jenckes Store Museum	Douglas	Worcester	Blackstone Valley	History	Operated by the Douglas Historical Society, photos
Eric Carle Museum of Picture Book Art	Amherst	Hampshire	Pioneer Valley	Art	Art in picture books and children's books, works of Eric Carle
Erving House Museum	Erving	Franklin	Pioneer Valley	Local history	Housed in the former Erving Fire Station
Essex Shipbuilding Museum	Essex	Essex	North Shore	Industry	Area shipbuilding, includes antique shipbuilding tools, photographs
Eustis Estate	Milton	Norfolk	Greater Boston	Historic house	Late Victorian house, operated by Historic New England
Fred Holland Day House	Norwood	Norfolk	Greater Boston	History	Operated by the Norwood Historical Society, Arts & Crafts-style home of photographer F. Holland Day
Fairbanks House	Dedham	Norfolk	Greater Boston	Historic house	built c. 1637, is the oldest wood-frame house in America
Fall River Firefighters Memorial Museum	Fall River	Bristol	Southeastern Massachusetts	Firefighting	Facebook site
Fall River Historical Society Museum	Fall River	Bristol	Southeastern Massachusetts	Local history	website, city history with an emphasis on 19th-century decorative arts
Falls Fire Barn Museum	Attleboro Falls	Bristol	Southeastern Massachusetts	Firefighting	Located in a historic fire station
Falmouth Museums on the Green	Falmouth	Barnstable	Cape Cod	Open air	website, operated by the Falmouth Historical Society, includes 1790 Dr. Francis Wicks House, 1724 Conant House, Hallett Barn
Faulkner House	Acton	Middlesex	Greater Boston	Historic house	Operated by Iron Work Farm, 18th-century house with ties to the American Revolutionary War
Field Farm	Williamstown	Berkshire	The Berkshires	Historic house	The Folly, a Modernist house, designed by Ulrich Franzen in 1966
Fisher Barn	Dover	Norfolk	Greater Boston	Historic site	website, tools and agriculture equipment, operated by the Dover Historical Society, which also owns the Benjamin Caryl House and Sawin Museum
Fisher Museum Harvard Forest	Petersham	Worcester	North County	Natural history	Located in Harvard Forest, 3,000 acres (12 km^{2}) with trails, museum with 23 dioramas portraying the history, conservation and management of central New England forests
Fisher School	Westwood	Norfolk	Greater Boston	History	website, headquarters of the Westwood Historical Society
Fitchburg Art Museum	Fitchburg	Worcester	North County	Art	Includes American and European paintings, prints, and ceramics, Egyptian, Classical, and pre-Columbian antiquities
Fitchburg Historical Society Museum	Fitchburg	Worcester	North County	History	website
Florence Higginbotham House	Nantucket	Nantucket	Nantucket	Historic house	website, part of Museum of African American History
Fogg Art Museum	Cambridge	Middlesex	Greater Boston	Art	Part of Harvard University, history of western art from the Middle Ages to the present
Forbes House Museum	Milton	Norfolk	Greater Boston	Historic house	19th-century period mansion
Fort Warren	Milton	Norfolk	Greater Boston	Military	19th-century fort, located on Georges Island
Fort Taber Historical Association Museum	New Bedford	Bristol	Southeastern Massachusetts	Military	
Framingham History Center	Framingham	Middlesex	Greater Boston	History	website, local history and culture
Franklin Historical Museum	Franklin	Norfolk	Greater Boston	History	website, operated by the Franklin Historical Commission
Frederick Law Olmsted National Historic Site	Brookline	Norfolk	Greater Boston	Biographical	Victorian home of landscape architect Frederick Law Olmsted
Freetown Historical Society Museum	Assonet	Bristol	Southeastern Massachusetts	History	website
French Cable Station Museum	Orleans	Barnstable	Cape Cod	History	Collection of original Atlantic undersea telegraphic cables, instruments, maps and memorabilia
Frelinghuysen Morris House and Studio	Lenox	Berkshire	The Berkshires	Historic house	Home of American Abstract Artists George L.K. Morris and Suzy Frelinghuysen, collection of American and European Cubist Art
Fruitlands Museum	Harvard	Worcester	North County	Multiple	Historic house museum with exhibits about transcendentalism, buildings with Native American, Shaker and American art collections on 200 acres (0.81 km^{2})
Fuller Craft Museum	Brockton	Plymouth	Plymouth	Art	Contemporary crafts including furniture, glass, ceramics, jewelry, wood and textiles
G.A.R. & Civil War Museum	Marblehead	Essex	North Shore	Military	website
The Gardner Museum (Gardner, Massachusetts)	Gardner	Worcester	North County	History	website, local history, household artifacts, firefighting equipment, paintings by local artists, locally made furniture and silver
Gardner-Pingree House	Salem	Essex	North Shore	Historic house	19th-century period townhouse, operated by the Peabody Essex Museum
Gedney House	Salem	Essex	North Shore	Historic house	Owned by Historic New England, open two days a year, 17th-century home
General Artemas Ward House Museum	Shrewsbury	Worcester	Blackstone Valley	Historic house	18th-century home of the First Commander-in-Chief of the American Revolution, owned by Harvard University
General Gideon Foster House	Peabody	Essex	North Shore	Historic house	Home to Peabody Historical Society which also operates Osborne - Salata House, Nathaniel Felton Houses, Peabody Historical Fire Museum which are open by appointment
George A. Smith Museum	Arlington	Middlesex	Greater Boston	History	website, operated by the Arlington Historical Society, local history, also 18th- and 19th-century period Jason Russell House
George Walter Vincent Smith Art Museum	Springfield	Hampden	Pioneer Valley	Art	Includes Japanese Samurai armor, Middle Eastern rugs, ceramics, an authentic Shinto shrine and Oriental cloissonné work
George Peabody House Museum	Peabody	Essex	North Shore	Biographical	Life of 19th-century U.S. entrepreneur and philanthropist George Peabody
Gershom Bradford House	Duxbury	Plymouth	Plymouth	Historic house	1840s period house, operated by the Duxbury Rural & Historical Society
Gilbert Bean Museum	Braintree	Norfolk	Greater Boston	Local history	website, home to Braintree Historical Society, display of military artifacts of various periods of war, and includes artifacts, documents, manuscripts, and artwork from the estate of Thomas A. Watson, assistant to Alexander Graham Bell
Gill Historical Commission Museum	Gill	Franklin	Pioneer Valley	Local history	
Girl Scout Museum (Massachusetts)	Waltham	Middlesex	Greater Boston	History	website, open to Girl Scout troops, also located in North Andover and Middleboro
Glen Magna Farms	Danvers	Essex	North Shore	Historic house	Historic country estate with grounds for touring
Golden Ball Tavern Museum	Weston	Middlesex	Greater Boston	Historic house	website
Gore Place	Waltham	Middlesex	Greater Boston	Historic house	Early 19th-century estate of Massachusetts Governor Christopher Gore, also small farm with animals
Governor Bellingham-Cary House	Chelsea	Suffolk	Greater Boston	Historic house	17th-century mansion
Grand Army of the Republic Museum	Lynn	Essex	North Shore	Military	Artifacts and memorabilia from the Civil War and other wars
Great Barrington Historical Society Museum at the Wheeler Family Farmstead	Great Barrington	Berkshire	The Berkshires	History	
Great Falls Discovery Center	Turners Falls	Franklin	Pioneer Valley	Multiple	website, Connecticut River watershed's natural, cultural and industrial history
Gropius House	Lincoln	Middlesex	Greater Boston	Historic house	Owned by Historic New England, designed by and family home of architect Walter Gropius
Groton Historical Society Museum	Groton	Middlesex	Greater Boston	History	website
Grout-Heard House	Wayland	Middlesex	Greater Boston	Historic house	website, home to the Wayland Historical Society
Hadley Farm Museum	Hadley	Hampshire	Pioneer Valley	History	website, household tools, furnishings, vehicles and equipment used on New England farms and farmhouses from the late 1700s to the early 20th century
Hadwen House	Nantucket	Nantucket	Nantucket	Historic house	website, operated by the Nantucket Historical Association, 19th-century period mansion
Hammond Castle Museum	Gloucester	Essex	North Shore	Historic house	Homeand laboratory of inventor John Hays Hammond, Jr., features collection of Roman, medieval, and Renaissance artifacts, and exhibits about his life and inventions
Hancock–Clarke House	Lexington	Middlesex	Greater Boston	Historic house	18th-century period home, played a prominent role in the Battle of Lexington and Concord
Hancock Shaker Village	Hancock	Berkshire	The Berkshires	Religious	Open air Shaker village with 20 historic buildings
Handy House	Westport	Bristol	Southeastern Massachusetts	History	Operated by the Westport Historical Society, 18th and 19th-century house
Harlow Old Fort House	Plymouth	Plymouth	Plymouth	Historic house	17th-century period house
Hart Nautical Museum	Cambridge	Middlesex	Greater Boston	Maritime	Operated by the MIT Museum, includes drawings and ship models
Harvard Historical Society	Harvard	Worcester	North County	History	Town history including furniture, artifacts, and paintings
Harvard Museum of Natural History	Cambridge	Middlesex	Greater Boston	Natural history	Part of Harvard University, includes Harvard University Herbaria and Botanical Museum, Museum of Comparative Zoology and Harvard Mineralogical Museum
Haverhill Fire Fighting Museum	Haverhill	Essex	Merrimack Valley	Firefighting	website
Heald House	Carlisle	Middlesex	Greater Boston	Historic house	website, operated by the Carlisle Historical Society
Heard House Museum	Ipswich	Essex	North Shore	Historic house	website, operated by the Ipswich Historical Society, 19th-century period house
Heath Historical Society Museum	Heath	Franklin	Pioneer Valley	Local history	
Hedge House	Plymouth	Plymouth	Plymouth	Historic house	Also known as Plymouth Antiquarian House, 19th-century period house
Helen Bumpus Gallery	Duxbury	Plymouth	Plymouth	Art	website, art gallery at the Duxbury Free Library
Heritage Museums and Gardens	Sandwich	Barnstable	Cape Cod	Multiple	History, industry, art, automobiles and horticulture, featuring J. K. Lilly III Antique Automobile Collection, American History Museum with military miniatures, antique toys, Native American artifacts and the Cape Cod Baseball League Hall of Fame and exhibit, and the Art Museum with folk art, carvings, collectibles and American fine art, as well as an operating hand-carved carousel
Highland House Museum	Truro	Barnstable	Cape Cod	History	Operated by the Truro Historical Society
Historic Deerfield	Deerfield	Franklin	Pioneer Valley	Open air	Includes seven historic house museums and a modern museum with changing exhibits
Highfield Hall	Falmouth	Barnstable	Cape Cod	Multiple	website, late 19th-century mansion, features art exhibits, culture and nature programs
Historic Northampton	Northampton	Hampshire	Pioneer Valley	History	website, Northampton and Connecticut Valley history
Historical Society of Phillipston Museum	Phillipston	Worcester	North County	History	website, located in a 19th-century church
Holden Historical Society	Holden	Worcester	Blackstone Valley	History	website, housed in Hendrick's House
Holyoke Heritage State Park	Holyoke	Hampden	Pioneer Valley	Industry	Exhibits about area paper and textile industry, local cultural heritage
Hooper-Lee-Nichols House	Cambridge	Middlesex	Greater Boston	Historic house	Colonial American house, operated by the Cambridge Historical Society
Hopkinton Center for the Arts	Hopkinton	Middlesex	Greater Boston	Art	website, art gallery, performing arts, arts education
Hose Cart House	Nantucket	Nantucket	Nantucket	Fire	website, operated by the Nantucket Historical Association, vintage 19th-century hose carts and pumpers
Hosmer House	Acton	Middlesex	Greater Boston	Historic house	website, operated by the Acton Historical Society, restored mid-18th-century house, open for special events
House of the Seven Gables	Salem	Essex	North Shore	Historic house	Colonial mansion, property includes Nathaniel Hawthorne Birthplace
Hoxie House	Sandwich	Barnstable	Cape Cod	Historic house	17th-century saltbox house, open seasonally
Hull Lifesaving Museum	Hull	Plymouth	Plymouth	Maritime	1889 Point Allerton U.S. Lifesaving Station with exhibits about the maritime history of Boston Harbor
The Icon Museum and Study Center	Clinton	Worcester	North County	Art	Includes icons and Eastern Christian art from the 13th century to the present
Imagine: A Center for Community & the Arts	Cambridge	Middlesex	Greater Boston	Children's	website, Children's Museum; Indoor Playground; Art Gallery; Party & Event Venue
Indian House Children’s Museum	Deerfield	Franklin	Pioneer Valley	Children's	website, operated by Pocumtuck Valley Memorial Association, focuses on history
International Paper Museum	Brookline	Norfolk	Greater Boston	Industry	website, active papermaking studio, history of paper making, books, operated by the Research Institute of Paper History and Technology
Isaac Winslow House	Marshfield	Plymouth	Plymouth	Historic house	Early 18th-century period house and Daniel Webster Law Office
Jabez Howland House	Plymouth	Plymouth	Plymouth	Historic house	17th-century period house
Jacob Thompson House	Monson	Hampden	Pioneer Valley	Historic house	website, operated by the Monson Historical Society, 18th-century period house
Jason Holbrook Homestead	Weymouth	Norfolk	Greater Boston	Historic house	website, operated by the Weymouth Historical Society, includes antiques, a shoe shop, military room, carriage house with antique sleighs, ice harvesting tools and antique farm tools
Jason Russell House	Arlington	Middlesex	Greater Boston	Historic house	18th- and 19th-century period house
Jenney Grist Mill	Plymouth	Plymouth	Plymouth	Mill	Working grist mill
Jeremiah Lee Mansion	Marblehead	Essex	North Shore	Historic house	18th-century period mansion with early American furniture and decorations,
Jericho Historical Center	West Dennis	Barnstable	Cape Cod	Historic house	website, operated by the Dennis Historical Society, features exhibits of antiques, glassware, costumes
Job Lane House	Bedford	Middlesex	Greater Boston	Historic house	18th-century period house
John Adams Birthplace	Quincy	Norfolk	Greater Boston	Historic house	Part of Adams National Historical Park, next door to John Quincy Adams Birthplace
Colonel John Ashley House	Sheffield	Berkshire	The Berkshires	Historic house	18th-century house with 18th- and early-19th-century furnishings
John Balch House	Beverly	Essex	North Shore	Historic house	Operated by the Beverly Historical Society, 17th-century house
John Cabot House	Beverly	Essex	North Shore	Historic house	Operated by the Beverly Historical Society, 18th-century house with rotating exhibits
Rev. John Hale Farm	Beverly	Essex	North Shore	Historic house	Operated by the Beverly Historical Society, early 17th-century house with room containing witchcraft-related artifacts, also called John Hale House
John F. Kennedy Hyannis Museum	Hyannis	Barnstable	Cape Cod	Biographical	Collection of photographs relating to the Kennedy family and the times they spent vacationing nearby
John F. Kennedy Presidential Library and Museum	Boston	Suffolk	Greater Boston	History	Official repository for original papers and correspondence of the Kennedy Administration, as well as special bodies of published and unpublished materials, such as books and papers by and about Ernest Hemingway.
John Fitzgerald Kennedy National Historic Site	Brookline	Norfolk	Greater Boston	Historic house	Birthplace and childhood home of President John F. Kennedy restored to 1917 appearance
John Greenleaf Whittier Home	Amesbury	Essex	Merrimack Valley	Historic house	Home of poet John Greenleaf Whittier
John Greenleaf Whittier Homestead	Haverhill	Essex	Merrimack Valley	Historic house	Birthplace of John Greenleaf Whittier
John Quincy Adams Birthplace	Quincy	Norfolk	Greater Boston	Historic house	Next door to John Adams Birthplace, part of Adams National Historical Park
John Ward House	Salem	Essex	North Shore	Historic house	17th-century period house, operated by the Peabody Essex Museum
Jonathan Bourne Historical Center	Bourne	Barnstable	Cape Cod	Local history	website, operated by the Bourne Historical Society
Jones Tavern	Acton	Middlesex	Greater Boston	Tavern	Operated by Iron Work Farm, 18th-century home and tavern
Joseph Allen Skinner Museum	South Hadley	Hampshire	Pioneer Valley	Multiple	website, owned by Mount Holyoke College, collection of American and European furniture, decorative arts, crafts, tools, and geological specimens
Josiah Day House	West Springfield	Hampden	Pioneer Valley	Historic house	18th-century house with artifacts from 1754–1902
Josiah Dennis Manse Museum	Dennis	Barnstable	Cape Cod	Historic house	18th-century period house, open in the summer, operated by the Dennis Historical Society
Josiah Quincy House	Quincy	Norfolk	Greater Boston	Historic house	Owned by Historic New England, 18th-century home open 5 days a year
Judge Samuel Holten House	Danvers	Essex	North Shore	Historic house	Open by appointment, 17th-century house
Keep Homestead Museum	Monson	Hampden	Pioneer Valley	History	website, known for its button collection
Kemp-McCarthy Memorial Museum	Rowe	Franklin	Pioneer Valley	History	website, operated by the Rowe Historical Society, includes antique quilts, 19th-century dolls, period costumes, china and glassware, sleighs, furniture, photographs, cookware, tools, farm implements
King Caesar House	Duxbury	Plymouth	Plymouth	Historic house	Early 19th-century period home, operated by the Duxbury Rural & Historical Society
Kingman Tavern Historical Museum	Cummington	Hampshire	Pioneer Valley	Historic house	website, includes early 19th-century house, replica of a 1900 country store, a two-story barn, a carriage shed and an 1840s cider mill
Lafayette-Durfee House	Fall River	Bristol	Southeastern Massachusetts	Historic house	18th-century period house
Larz Anderson Auto Museum	Brookline	Norfolk	Greater Boston	Automotive	Early automobiles and horse-drawn vehicles
Lawrence Heritage State Park	Lawrence	Essex	Merrimack Valley	Industry	Exhibits include life of 19th-century textile mill workers and the industrial history of Lawrence
Lawrence History Center	Lawrence	Essex	Merrimack Valley	History	website
Leominster Historical Society Museum	Leominster	Worcester	North County	History	website
Lesley University Galleries	Cambridge	Middlesex	Greater Boston	Art	website, includes the Roberts Gallery and Raizes Gallery in the Lunder Arts Center, VanDernoot Gallery in University Hall, Marran Gallery
Leverett Family Museum	Leverett	Franklin	Pioneer Valley	Local history	website, operated by the Leverett Historical Society, also operates the Moore’s Corner Schoolhouse
List Visual Arts Center	Cambridge	Middlesex	Greater Boston	Art	Contemporary art gallery of the Massachusetts Institute of Technology
Little Red Schoolhouse Museum	Brockton	Plymouth	Plymouth	Local history	Operated by the Little Red Schoolhouse Association in the two-story schoolhouse on the grounds of Brockton High School
Little Red Shop Museum	Hopedale	Worcester	Blackstone Valley	Local history	website, exhibits of local history, area textile company looms
Longfellow House–Washington's Headquarters National Historic Site	Cambridge	Middlesex	Greater Boston	Historic house	Home of Henry Wadsworth Longfellow and former headquarters of George Washington during the Siege of Boston
Long Plain Friends Meetinghouse	Acushnet	Bristol	Southeastern Massachusetts	Religious	18th-century Quaker meetinghouse with exhibits about Quakers
Long Plain Museum	Acushnet	Bristol	Southeastern Massachusetts	Local history	website, operated by the Acushnet Historical Society
Longyear Museum	Chestnut Hill	Suffolk	Greater Boston	Biographical	website, life and work of Mary Baker Eddy, founder of Christian Science
Lowell National Historical Park	Lowell	Middlesex	Merrimack Valley	Industry	Includes visitor center, Boott Cotton Mills Museum, Patrick J. Mogan Cultural Center, Mill Girls and Immigrants Exhibit
Lura Woodside Watkins Museum	Middleton	Essex	North Shore	History	Home of Middleton Historical Society
Luther Museum	Swansea	Bristol	Southeastern Massachusetts	History	photos, home to Swansea Historical Society
Lynn Heritage State Park	Lynn	Essex	North Shore	Local history	Exhibits on area shoe manufacturing, pioneering developments in electronics, 19th-century reformers, Lydia Pinkham's medicinals
Lynn Museum & Historical Society	Lynn	Essex	North Shore	Multiple	website, art, history, library, collections of art, tools, decorative arts & textiles
Macy-Colby House	Amesbury	Essex	Merrimack Valley	Historic house	18th-century period saltbox house
Major John Bradford Homestead	Kingston	Plymouth	Plymouth	Historic house	Home to Jones River Village Historical Society
Manchester Historical Museum	Manchester-by-the-Sea	Essex	North Shore	Historic house	website, includes the 19th-century period Trask House and the Seaside No. 1 Fire House
Marblehead Arts Association	Marblehead	Essex	North Shore	Art	Located in historic Robert "King" Hooper Mansion, features four galleries for changing art exhibits
Marblehead Museum	Marblehead	Essex	North Shore	Multiple	website, local history, Frost Folk Art Gallery, operates the Jeremiah Lee Mansion and G.A.R. & Civil War Museum
Marine Museum at Fall River	Fall River	Bristol	Southeastern Massachusetts	Maritime	Memorabilia, artifacts, and ship models of the Fall River Line and RMS Titanic
Marion Natural History Museum	Marion	Plymouth	Plymouth	Natural history	website, located on the 2nd floor of the town library
Martha's Vineyard Museum	Edgartown	Dukes	Martha's Vineyard	Local history	website, island's history, art and culture
Martin House and Farm	Swansea	Bristol	Southeastern Massachusetts	Historic house	Run by the National Society of Colonial Dames of America, early 18th-century house and early 19th-century farm
Mary Baker Eddy Historic House	Stoughton	Norfolk	Greater Boston	Historic house	Owned by Longyear Museum, one of several homes associated with Mary Baker Eddy, founder of the Church of Christ, Scientist
Mary Baker Eddy Historic House	Swampscott	Essex	North Shore	Historic house	Owned by Longyear Museum, one of several homes associated with Mary Baker Eddy, founder of the Church of Christ, Scientist
Mashpee Wampanoag Indian Museum	Mashpee	Barnstable	Cape Cod	Native American	History and culture of the Mashpee Wampanoag Tribe
Massachusetts Air and Space Museum	Hyannis	Barnstable	Cape Cod	Air and space	Its collection includes aircraft, aerospace systems, space craft, photographs, and artifacts
MassArt Art Museum	Boston	Suffolk	Greater Boston	Contemporary and visual performing arts	website, Boston's newest and only free contemporary art museum. The teaching museum for Massachusetts College of Art and Design, referred to as MAAM
Massachusetts Golf Museum	Norton	Bristol	Southeastern Massachusetts	Sports	website, operated by the Massachusetts Golf Association
Massachusetts Museum of Contemporary Art	North Adams	Berkshire	The Berkshires	Art	Contemporary visual and performing arts, commonly referred to as MASS MoCA
Massachusetts National Guard Museum	Concord	Middlesex	Greater Boston	Military	website, history of the Massachusetts National Guard
Mattapoisett Historical Society Museum	Mattapoisett	Plymouth	Plymouth	Local history	website
Mayflower House Museum	Plymouth	Plymouth	Plymouth	Historic house	18th-century period mansion
McMullen Museum of Art	Chestnut Hill	Suffolk	Greater Boston	Art	Part of Boston College
Mead Art Museum	Amherst	Hampshire	Pioneer Valley	Art	Part of Amherst College, collection includes American art, Russian Modernist works, decorative arts
Meeting House Museum	Orleans	Barnstable	Cape Cod	History	Local history, operated by the Orleans Historical Society in a 19th-century meeting house
Memorial Hall Museum	Deerfield	Franklin	Pioneer Valley	History	website, operated by Pocumtuck Valley Memorial Association, includes furnishings, paintings, textiles and Indian artifacts
Mendon Historical Museum	Mendon	Worcester	Blackstone Valley	Local history	Operated by the Honeoye Falls-Town of Mendon Historical Society
Merwin House	Stockbridge	Berkshire	The Berkshires	Historic house	Owned by Historic New England, 19th-century period home
Michele & Donald D'Amour Museum of Fine Arts	Springfield	Hampden	Pioneer Valley	Art	Includes American art, contemporary art glass, lithographs of Currier & Ives, fine European art
Middleborough Historical Museum	Middleborough	Plymouth	Plymouth	Local history	Features collection on Tom Thumb
Middlesex Canal Museum	North Billerica	Middlesex	Merrimack Valley	Transportation	website, history of the Middlesex Canal
Milford Historical Museum	Milford	Worcester	Blackstone Valley	History	Local history, operated by the Milford Historical Commission
Milton Art Museum	Milton	Norfolk	Greater Boston	Art	website, collections include fine art, limited prints, sculpture, photography and Asian art, located at Massasoit Community College
Minute Man National Historical Park	Lexington	Middlesex	Greater Boston	History	Visitor center exhibits and several famous historic sites of the American Revolutionary War
Mission House	Stockbridge	Berkshire	The Berkshires	Historic house	18th-century period home
Mitchell House	Nantucket	Nantucket	Nantucket	Historic house	19th-century period home of astronomer Maria Mitchell
MIT Museum	Cambridge	Middlesex	Greater Boston	Science	Part of Massachusetts Institute of Technology, ongoing and changing exhibitions on science and technology, holography, artificial intelligence, robotics and history of MIT
The Mount	Lenox	Berkshire	The Berkshires	Historic house	Early 20th-century mansion and gardens, home of author Edith Wharton
Mount Holyoke College Art Museum	South Hadley	Hampshire	Pioneer Valley	Art	Collections include ancient Egypt, China, Peru, contemporary American art
Munroe Tavern	Lexington	Middlesex	Greater Boston	Historic house	18th-century tavern that played a prominent role in the Battle of Lexington and Concord
Murdoch-Whitney House Museum	Winchendon	Worcester	North County	Historic house	website, home of Winchendon Historical Society, Victorian-period house
Museum of Antiquated Technology	Hanson	Plymouth	Plymouth	Technology	website, open by appointment, includes antique telephones, radios, antique cars and miscellaneous household items
Museum of American Bird Art at Mass Audubon	Canton	Norfolk	Greater Boston	Art	website, museum and nature center with collections of natural history art and photography
Museum of Bad Art	Dedham	Norfolk	Greater Boston	Art	"art too bad to be ignored", location currently closed
Museum of Bad Art	Somerville	Middlesex	Greater Boston	Art	"art too bad to be ignored"
Museum of Fairhaven History	Fairhaven	Bristol	Southeastern Massachusetts	Local history	website, operated by the Fairhaven Historical Society
Museum of Lenox History	Lenox	Berkshire	The Berkshires	History	website, operated by the Lenox Historical Society
Museum of Our Industrial Heritage	Greenfield	Franklin	Pioneer Valley	Industry	website, area industrial history and impact
Museum of Madeiran Heritage	New Bedford	Bristol	Southeastern Massachusetts	Ethnic	website, dedicated to the history and heritage of the islands of Madeira that lie 600 miles (970 km) southwest of Portugal
Museum of Printing	North Andover	Essex	Merrimack Valley	Industry	History of printing technologies and practices
Museum of Springfield History	Springfield	Hampden	Pioneer Valley	History	City's history and culture, includes Indian motorcycles from the former Indian Motorcycle Museum
Museum of World War II	Natick	Middlesex	Greater Boston	Military	World War II history, photos, documents and memorabilia
Nahant Historical Society	Nahant	Essex	North Shore	Local history	website, located in the Nahant Community Center
Nantucket Life-Saving Museum	Nantucket	Nantucket	Nantucket	Maritime	History of shipwrecks off the Nantucket coast and in Nantucket Sound
Nantucket Lightship Basket Museum	Nantucket	Nantucket	Nantucket	Decorative arts	History of Nantucket lightship baskets
Narragansett Historical Society	Templeton	Worcester	North County	Local history	website
Nash Dinosaur Track Site and Rock Shop	South Hadley	Hampshire	Pioneer Valley	Paleontology	website, features dinosaur tracks and dinosaur fossils
Nathaniel Felton Houses	Peabody	Essex	North Shore	Historic house	Colonial period houses, operated by the Peabody Historical Society
Natick Historical Society Museum	Natick	Middlesex	Greater Boston	Local history	website, housed on the lower level of the Bacon Free Library
Scottish Rite Masonic Museum & Library	Lexington	Middlesex	Greater Boston	Multiple	American and Massachusetts history, culture, decorative arts and American fraternalism and Freemasonry. website
National Streetcar Museum	Lowell	Middlesex	Merrimack Valley	Transportation	Historic streetcars, influence of street railways on the development of cities
National Yiddish Book Center	Amherst	Hampshire	Pioneer Valley	Ethnic	Yiddish and Jewish culture
Natural Science Museum in Hinchman House	Nantucket	Nantucket	Nantucket	Natural history	Part of the Maria Mitchell Association museums, Nantucket animals, insects, plants
Naumkeag	Stockbridge	Berkshire	The Berkshires	Historic house	Turn-of-the-century mansion and grounds
New Bedford Art Museum	New Bedford	Bristol	Southeastern Massachusetts	Art	website, changing exhibits of art, no permanent collections
New Bedford Fire Museum	New Bedford	Bristol	Southeastern Massachusetts	Firefighting	
New Bedford Museum of Glass	New Bedford	Bristol	Southeastern Massachusetts	Multiple	Glass from ancient Mediterranean to contemporary with a special focus on the glass of New Bedford
New Bedford Whaling Museum	New Bedford	Bristol	Southeastern Massachusetts	Multiple	Exhibits include whaling industry, local history, local fine art and decorative arts, maritime history
New Bedford Whaling National Historical Park	New Bedford	Bristol	Southeastern Massachusetts	Multiple	Partner sites include the New Bedford Whaling Museum, Rotch-Jones-Duff House and Garden Museum, Seamen's Bethel, Waterfront Visitor Center and Schooner Ernestina
New Braintree Historical Society	New Braintree	Worcester	Blackstone Valley	Local history	website, operates the 1939 Grade School as a town post office and schoolroom museum that is open by appointment
New England Pirate Museum	Salem	Essex	North Shore	Pirate	website, famous pirates who operated in New England including Captains Kidd and Blackbeard
New England Quilt Museum	Lowell	Middlesex	Merrimack Valley	Textile	Art and craft of quilting
Newton History Museum at the Jackson Homestead	Newton	Middlesex	Greater Boston	Local history	
Norman Rockwell Museum	Stockbridge	Berkshire	The Berkshires	Art	Features largest collection of art by Norman Rockwell, also his painter's studio
North Adams Museum of History and Science	North Adams	Berkshire	The Berkshires	Multiple	Located in building 5A at Western Gateway Heritage State Park, area cultural history and industry
North Andover Historical Society Museum	North Andover	Essex	Merrimack Valley	Local history	website, also tours of the 18th-century period Parson Barnard House on a seasonal basis
Oakham Historical Museum	Oakham	Worcester	Blackstone Valley	Local history	website, operated by the Oakham Historical Association
Old Bridgewater Historical Society Museum	West Bridgewater	Plymouth	Plymouth	History	website, also Keith House Parsonage is open by appointment
Old Castle	Rockport	Essex	North Shore	Historic house	Open on Saturdays in July and August, 18th-century house
Old Chelmsford Garrison House	Chelmsford	Middlesex	Merrimack Valley	Historic house	Includes Colonial period house, barn with tools and farm implements, blacksmith shop, Colonial summer kitchen and craft demonstration house
Old Colony Train Station	North Easton	Bristol	Southeastern Massachusetts	History	website, operated by the Easton Historical Society
Old Colony Historical Society	Taunton	Bristol	Southeastern Massachusetts	Local history	
Oldest House	Nantucket	Nantucket	Nantucket	Historic house	Also known as the Jethro Coffin House, 17th-century saltbox house, operated by the Nantucket Historical Association
Old Firehouse Museum	South Hadley	Hampshire	Pioneer Valley	Local history	website, operated by the South Hadley Historical Society, history of the people and industries of South Hadley, firefighting gear
Old Gaol (Nantucket, Massachusetts)	Nantucket	Nantucket	Nantucket	Prison	website, operated by the Nantucket Historical Association
Old Greenfield Village	Greenfield	Franklin	Pioneer Valley	Open air	website, replica turn-of-the-century village with a general store, church, school house, drugstore, blacksmith, tin shop, ice cream shop, medical offices and more
The Old Manse	Concord	Middlesex	Greater Boston	Historic house	18th- and 19th-century period home with links to authors Nathaniel Hawthorne and Ralph Waldo Emerson
Old Meeting House Museum	Wilbraham	Hampden	Pioneer Valley	History	website, operated by the Atheneum Society of Wilbraham
Old Mill	Nantucket	Nantucket	Nantucket	Mill	Operated by the Nantucket Historical Association
Old Ordinary	Hingham	Plymouth	Plymouth	Historic house	website, operated by the Hingham Historical Society, Colonial tavern dating to 1688
Old Red Carriage House	Gill	Franklin	Pioneer Valley	Collection	website, baby and children's memorabilia, carriages, dolls, toys, and clothing from the 18th century through the present
Old Schwamb Mill	Arlington	Middlesex	Greater Boston	Industry	Working 19th-century woodworking factory
Old Sturbridge Village	Sturbridge	Worcester	Blackstone Valley	Living	1790 to 1830 period village
Orange Historical Society Museum	Orange	Franklin	Pioneer Valley	Local history	website
Orchard House	Concord	Middlesex	Greater Boston	Historic house	19th-century home of Louisa May Alcott family
Osterville Historical Museum	Barnstable	Barnstable	Cape Cod	Open air	website, operated by the Osterville Historical Society, includes Captain Jonathan Parker House, circa 1824, the Cammett House, circa 1730, and the Herbert F. Crosby Boat Shop, circa 1855
Pan-African Historical Museum	Springfield	Hampden	Pioneer Valley	Cultural	website, African culture and African-American history
Paper House	Rockport	Essex	North Shore	Historic house	website, house made entirely of paper
Parker Tavern	Reading	Middlesex	Greater Boston	Historic house	17th-century period tavern house, owned by the Reading Antiquarian Society
Parson Capen House	Topsfield	Essex	North Shore	Historic house	17th-century Colonial house
Peabody Essex Museum	Salem	Essex	North Shore	Multiple	Includes Asian, Native American and folk art, maritime artifacts, collection, folk art and other art, 24 historic structures and gardens, and Yin Yu Tang House, an authentic Chinese merchant's house
Peabody Historical Fire Museum	Peabody	Essex	North Shore	Fire	website, open by appointment
Peabody Leather Museum	Peabody	Essex	North Shore	Industry	website
Peabody Museum of Archaeology and Ethnology	Cambridge	Middlesex	Greater Boston	Multiple	Archaeology and culture
Peacefield	Quincy	Norfolk	Greater Boston	Historic house	Part of the Adams National Historical Park, 18th-century home and farm of President John Adams
Peter Rice Homestead and Museum	Marlborough	Middlesex	Greater Boston	Historic house	website, 18th-century period house, home of Marlborough Historical Society
Pickering House	Salem	Essex	North Shore	Historic house	Owned by one family for over three centuries
Pilgrim Hall Museum	Plymouth	Plymouth	Plymouth	Local history	
Pilgrim Monument and Provincetown Museum	Provincetown	Barnstable	Cape Cod	Local history	252-foot-tall monument to climb and a museum of the town's history at its base
Pioneer Village	Salem	Essex	North Shore	Living	1630 period village of Salem's settlers
Platts-Bradstreet House	Rowley	Essex	Merrimack Valley	Historic house	Home of the Rowley Historical Society, 17th-century house open for events and tours
Plimoth Patuxet (formerly Plimoth Plantation)	Plymouth	Plymouth	Plymouth	Living	Reconstructs the original 17th-century settlement of the Plymouth Colony
The Plumbing Museum	Watertown	Middlesex	Greater Boston	Technology	website, features early examples of plumbing equipment with modern fixtures and techniques
Polish Center of Discovery and Learning	Chicopee	Hampden	Pioneer Valley	Multiple	website, galleries with Polish folk art, local history, music collection, Polish-American exhibits, and a period Polish cottage
Porter-Phelps-Huntington House Museum	Hadley	Hampshire	Pioneer Valley	Historic house	18th-century period house
Provincetown Art Association and Museum	Provincetown	Barnstable	Cape Cod	Art	Art by local artists
Public Health Museum	Tewksbury	Middlesex	Merrimack Valley	Medical	website, located on the historic grounds of Tewksbury Hospital
General Israel Putnam House	Danvers	Essex	North Shore	Historic house	Open for tours by appointment with the Danvers Historical Society, house dating back to the late 17th century
Putterham School	Brookline	Norfolk	Greater Boston	School	One room schoolhouse
Quaboag Historical Museum	West Brookfield	Worcester	Blackstone Valley	Local history	website, operated by the Quaboag Historical Society in the former West Brookfield railroad station
Quaker Meetinghouse (Nantucket, Massachusetts)	Nantucket	Nantucket	Nantucket	Religious	website, operated by the Nantucket Historical Association
Quincy History Museum	Quincy	Norfolk	Greater Boston	History	Operated by the Quincy Historical Society, local history and culture
Quincy Homestead	Quincy	Norfolk	Greater Boston	Historic house	Operated by the National Society of The Colonial Dames of America, 17th- and 18th-century period house
Ralph Waldo Emerson House	Concord	Middlesex	Greater Boston	Historic house	19th-century period home of American philosopher Ralph Waldo Emerson
Rebecca Nurse Homestead	Danvers	Essex	North Shore	Historic house	17th-century period home
Reed Homestead	Townsend	Middlesex	North County	Historic house	19th-century period home
Rider Tavern	Charlton	Worcester	Blackstone Valley	Historic tavern	Operated by the Charlton Historical Society
Robbins Museum	Middleborough	Plymouth	Plymouth	Archaeology	Operated by the Massachusetts Archaeological Society, features arrowheads, Native American artifacts and culture displays
Robert Treat Paine Estate	Waltham	Middlesex	Greater Boston	Historic house	Also known as Stonehurst, late 19th-century estate
Robert S. Peabody Museum of Archaeology	Andover	Essex	Merrimack Valley	Native American	Part of Phillips Academy, paleo-Indian and Native American archeological artifacts
Rocky Hill Meeting House	Amesbury	Essex	Merrimack Valley	Historic church	Owned by Historic New England, open twice a year, 18th-century meeting house
Ropes Mansion	Salem	Essex	North Shore	Historic house	Owned by Peabody Essex Museum
Rose Art Museum	Waltham	Middlesex	Greater Boston	Art	Part of Brandeis University
Rotch-Jones-Duff House and Garden Museum	New Bedford	Bristol	Southeastern Massachusetts	Historic house	19th-century whaling family period mansion
Royalston Historical Museum	Royalston	Worcester	Blackstone Valley	Local history	website, operated by the Royalston Historical Society in a historic schoolhouse
Royall House and Slave Quarters	Medford	Middlesex	Greater Boston	Historic house	18th-century period house and slave quarters
Rutland Historical Society	Rutland	Worcester	Blackstone Valley	Local history	website
Salem Athenaeum	Salem	Essex	North Shore	Library	Exhibits of art, history and literary topics from its collections
Salem Wax Museum	Salem	Essex	North Shore	Wax	website
Salem Maritime National Historic Site	Salem	Essex	North Shore	Maritime	Tours of a replica late 18th-century ship, several houses and a customs house
Salem Witch Museum	Salem	Essex	North Shore	History	website, life-size dioramas of the Salem witch trials
Salem Witch Village	Salem	Essex	North Shore	Culture	website, indoor guided tour through a maze containing sets about the history of witchcraft
Salisbury Mansion	Worcester	Worcester	Blackstone Valley	Historic house	1830s period mansion and changing exhibits
Samuel Slater Experience	Webster	Worcester	Blackstone Valley	History	website, interactive and immersive 4-D exhibits
Sanborn House Historical & Cultural Center	Winchester	Middlesex	Greater Boston	Multiple	Being restored by the Winchester Historical Society a historical and cultural center
Sandwich Glass Museum	Sandwich	Barnstable	Cape Cod	Glass	Glass from the Boston and Sandwich Glass Company and around the world
Sargent House Museum	Gloucester	Essex	North Shore	Historic house	Late 18th-century period house, also known as Sargent-Murray-Gilman-Hough House
Saugus Historical Society Museum	Saugus	Essex	North Shore	History	website
Saugus Iron Works	Saugus	Essex	North Shore	Industry	Includes the reconstructed blast furnace, forge, rolling mill, and a restored 17th-century house
Sawin Museum	Dover	Norfolk	Greater Boston	Local history	website, operated by the Dover Historical Society, which also owns the Benjamin Caryl House and Fisher Barn
Schoolhouse Museum	Eastham	Barnstable	Cape Cod	School	website, operated by the Eastham Historical Society, restored 19th-century schoolhouse, includes local history displays
Schooner Ernestina	New Bedford	Bristol	Southeastern Massachusetts	Maritime	Part of the New Bedford Whaling National Historical Park, museum ship
Scituate Maritime and Irish Mossing Museum	Scituate	Plymouth	Plymouth	Maritime	website, operated by the Scituate Historical Society
Semitic Museum at Harvard	Cambridge	Middlesex	Greater Boston	Archaeology	Archaeological materials from the Ancient Near East
Sewall Scripture Museum	Rockport	Essex	North Shore	History	Operated by the Sandy Bay Historical Society, local history
Sharon Historical Society Museum	Sharon	Norfolk	Southeastern Massachusetts	Local history	website, also known as the Yellow Schoolhouse Museum
Sheffield Historical Society	Sheffield	Berkshire	The Berkshires	History	website, includes the late 18th-century Dan Raymond House Museum, a carriage barn with agriculture and household equipment
Shelburne Falls Trolley Museum	Shelburne Falls	Franklin	Pioneer Valley	Railroad	
Shelburne Historical Society Museum	Shelburne Falls	Franklin	Pioneer Valley	History	Located in old Arms Academy
Shirley Historical Society Museum	Shirley	Middlesex	North County	Local history	website
Sippican Historical Society	Marion	Plymouth	Plymouth	Local history	website
Smith College Museum of Art	Northampton	Hampshire	Pioneer Valley	Art	Collections include paintings, sculptures, works on paper (prints, drawings, photographs, and books), antiquities, decorative arts, and non-Western art
Somerset Historical Society	Somerset	Bristol	Southeastern Massachusetts	Local history	website
Somerville Museum	Somerville	Middlesex	Greater Boston	Multiple	website, exhibitions featuring local visual arts, history and culture in the context of neighborhoods and community
Southborough Historical Society Museum	Southborough	Worcester	Blackstone Valley	History	website
South Shore Natural Science Center	Norwell	Plymouth	Plymouth	Nature center	website, live native animals, ecozone exhibits, located on 30 acres surrounded by 200 acres of town conservation/recreation land
Sparrow House	Plymouth	Plymouth	Plymouth	Historic house	17th-century house and art gallery
Spellman Museum of Stamps & Postal History	Weston	Middlesex	Greater Boston	Philatelic	Located at Regis College, stamps and postal history
Spencer-Peirce-Little Farm	Newbury	Essex	Merrimack Valley	Historic house	Owned by Historic New England, Colonial farm and house
Spooner House	Plymouth	Plymouth	Plymouth	Historic house	website, operated by the Plymouth Antiquarian Society, mid-18th-century house reflecting 200 years of ownership
Springfield Armory National Historic Site	Springfield	Hampden	Pioneer Valley	Military	
Springfield Science Museum	Springfield	Hampden	Pioneer Valley	Natural history	Natural history dioramas, dinosaurs, science
Stephen Phillips House	Salem	Essex	North Shore	Historic house	Operated by Historic New England, contains a family collection that spans five generations
Stevens-Coolidge Place	North Andover	Essex	Merrimack Valley	Historic house	Operated by The Trustees of Reservations, early 20th-century house with Asian artifacts including Chinese porcelain, American furniture, European decorative arts and gardens
Stoneham Historical Society Museum	Stoneham	Middlesex	Greater Boston	Local history	website
Stone House Museum	Belchertown	Hampshire	Pioneer Valley	Historic house	website, home of the Belchertown Historical Association, features mid-17th- and 18th-century American furniture, china and decorative accessories
Stony Brook Grist Mill and Museum	Brewster	Barnstable	Cape Cod	History	Working grist mill, exhibits include weaving demonstrations, Native American stone tools, artifacts from 19th-century Cape Cod life, open seasonally
Storrowton Village Museum	West Springfield	Hampden	Pioneer Valley	Open air	Recreated village of 18th- and 19th-century buildings assembled around a traditional town green, open seasonally
Storrs House	Longmeadow	Hampden	Pioneer Valley	Historic house	website, operated by the Longmeadow Historical Society, mid-18th-century house
Stoughton Historical Society	Stoughton	Norfolk	Southeastern Massachusetts	Local history	website, Society's home hosts exhibits of manuscripts, art, period clothing and artifacts from its archives
Susan B. Anthony Birthplace Museum	Adams	Berkshire	The Berkshires	Historic house	Home of Susan B. Anthony
Sutton Historical Society Museum	Sutton	Worcester	Blackstone Valley	Local history	website, located in the General Rufus Putnam Hall, includes antique clothing, tools, household items
Swett-Ilsley House	Newbury	Essex	Merrimack Valley	Historic house	Operated by Historic New England as a study museum
Swift-Daley House	Eastham	Barnstable	Cape Cod	Historic house	website, includes Chester Ranlett Tool Museum behind the house, 18th-century period house, operated by the Eastham Historical Society
Swift River Valley Historical Society Museum	New Salem	Franklin	Pioneer Valley	Local history	website, includes the Whitaker Clary House and Prescott Museum
Sylvanus Thayer Birthplace	Braintree	Norfolk	Greater Boston	Historic house	Operated by the Braintree Historical Society, 17th-century period house
Titanic Museum	Springfield	Hampden	Pioneer Valley	Maritime	Artifacts and history of the Titanic
Toad Hall Classic Sports Car Museum	Hyannis Port	Barnstable	Cape Cod	Automotive	website, private collection of over 50 classic sports cars
Top Fun Aviation Toy Museum	Fitchburg	Worcester	North County	Toy	website, aviation-related toys
Tsongas Industrial History Center	Lowell	Middlesex	Merrimack Valley	Industry	website, part of Lowell National Historical Park, American Industrial Revolution through hands-on history and science programs for students
Turn Park Art Space	West Stockbridge	Berkshire	The Berkshires	Art	Sculpture park and gallery of Soviet Nonconformist art.
United States Naval Shipbuilding Museum	Quincy	Norfolk	Greater Boston	Maritime	Home to USS Salem (CA-139), world's only preserved heavy cruiser
Ventfort Hall Mansion and Gilded Age Museum	Lenox	Berkshire	The Berkshires	Historic house	Late 19th-century period mansion
Vincent House (Edgartown, Massachusetts)	Edgartown	Dukes	Martha's Vineyard	Historic house	website, operated by Martha’s Vineyard Preservation Trust, 17th-century house depicts Island life throughout the last four centuries
Volleyball Hall of Fame	Holyoke	Hampden	Pioneer Valley	Sports	
The Waltham Museum	Waltham	Middlesex	Greater Boston	Local History	History of Waltham.
Wakefield Historical Society Museum	Wakefield	Middlesex	Greater Boston	Local history	website
Warwick Historical Society Museum	Warwick	Franklin	Pioneer Valley	Local history	http://www.whs.steamkite.com/ website]
Waters Farm	Sutton	Worcester	Blackstone Valley	Farm	19th-century period farm, open for special events
Waterworks Museum	Chestnut Hill	Suffolk	Greater Boston	Technology	website, Site of the original Chestnut Hill Reservoir and pumping station, housing three historic, steam-powered pumping engines. Exhibits about technology, local history and public health.
The Wayside	Concord	Middlesex	Greater Boston	Historic house	Part of Minute Man National Historical Park, home to authors Louisa May Alcott, Nathaniel Hawthorne and Margaret Sidney
Wayside Inn	Sudbury	Middlesex	Greater Boston	Historic house	property includes several historic buildings: the Old Grist Mill, the Martha-Mary Chapel and the Redstone Schoolhouse, reputed to be the school in nursery rhyme Mary Had a Little Lamb
Webster-Dudley Historical Society Museum	Webster	Worcester	Blackstone Valley	Local history	Located in a historic school building
Wellfleet Historical Society Museum	Wellfleet	Barnstable	Cape Cod	Local history	website, whaling, fishing, oystering, farming, shipping (and wrecking), surf lifesaving, salt making, and the worldwide voyages of its residents
Wenham Museum	Wenham	Essex	North Shore	Multiple	Local history, doll and toy collection, model train gallery, costumes & textiles, photographs, historic Claflin-Richards House
West Barnstable Railway Station and Museum	West Barnstable	Barnstable	Cape Cod	Railway	Heritage railroad and restored early 20th-century railroad station
West Dennis Graded School House	West Dennis	Barnstable	Cape Cod	Historic house	Operated by the Dennis Historical Society, open in summer, historic school house
Western Gateway Heritage State Park	North Adams	Berkshire	The Berkshires	Multiple	History, science, industry, Hoosac Tunnel, location of North Adams Museum of History and Science
Westfield Athenaeum Library Museum	Westfield	Hampden	Pioneer Valley	Multiple	Includes Jasper Rand Art Museum and Edwin Smith Historical Museum
Westford Museum	Westford	Middlesex	Merrimack Valley	Local history	website, operated by the Westford Historical Society
Weymouth Historical Museum	Weymouth	Norfolk	Greater Boston	Local history	website, operated by the Weymouth Historical Society
Whaling Museum	Nantucket	Nantucket	Nantucket	Industry	Includes restored 1847 candle factory, whaling industry artifacts, local maritime and historic artifacts, operated by the Nantucket Historical Association
Whately Historical Society Museum	Whately	Franklin	Pioneer Valley	Local history	website
Whipple House Museum	Ipswich	Essex	North Shore	Historic house	Operated by the Ipswich Historical Society, 17th- and 18th-century period house
Whistler House Museum of Art	Lowell	Middlesex	Merrimack Valley	Art	Birthplace of James McNeill Whistler
Whydah Pirate Museum	Provincetown	Barnstable	Cape Cod	Maritime	website, collection from the excavated shipwreck of the pirate ship Whydah Gally, which sank with 4.5 tons of pirate treasure in 1717
Wilder House	Buckland	Franklin	Pioneer Valley	Historic house	Operated by the Buckland Historical Society on open house days
Willard House and Clock Museum	North Grafton	Worcester	Blackstone Valley	Horology	Clock museum and 18th-century farm homestead
William Cullen Bryant Homestead	Cummington	Hampshire	Pioneer Valley	Historic house	19th-century period summer home of poet and newspaper editor William Cullen Bryant
Williams College Museum of Art	Williamstown	Berkshire	The Berkshires	Art	
Wilmington Town Museum	Wilmington	Middlesex	Merrimack Valley	History	18th-century tavern
Winslow Crocker House	Yarmouth	Barnstable	Cape Cod	Historic house	Operated by Historic New England, 18th-century house with hooked rugs, ceramics, and pewter, and furniture from many early American styles, from Jacobean, William and Mary, and Queen Anne to Chippendale
Wistariahurst Museum	Holyoke	Hampden	Pioneer Valley	Historic house	Late 19th-century house, reflects owners through the 1950s, exhibits of local history, art, culture
Witch Dungeon Museum	Salem	Essex	North Shore	History	website
Witch History Museum	Salem	Essex	North Shore	History	History of the area witch hysteria in 1692
The Witch House	Salem	Essex	North Shore	Historic house	17th-century home of Judge Jonathan Corwin, with direct ties to the Salem witch trials of 1692
Women at Work Museum	Attleboro	Bristol	Southeastern Massachusetts	Women's	website
Woods Hole Historical Museum	Falmouth	Barnstable	Cape Cod	Local history	website
Worcester Art Museum	Worcester	Worcester	Blackstone Valley	Art	Collections include American and European art, Asian art, Greek and Roman sculpture and mosaics, and Contemporary art
Worcester Center for Crafts	Worcester	Worcester	Blackstone Valley	Art	Gallery of crafts and center for craft education
Worcester Historical Museum	Worcester	Worcester	Blackstone Valley	Local history	City's history and culture

== Defunct museums ==
- American Textile History Museum in Lowell closed in June 2016.
- Connecticut Valley Historical Museum, Springfield, closed in 2009, building will house the Amazing World of Dr. Seuss Museum
- FDR Center Museum, Worcester
- A Frugal Woman's Museum, New Bedford, about Hetty Green, no current information
- Hallmark Museum of Contemporary Photography, Turners Falls, closed in 2012, student work still on display at Hallmark Institute of Photography
- Hands-On Art Museum, Shirley
- Higgins Armory Museum - closed in 2014, collection will be absorbed into Worcester Art Museum
- Hollywood House of Wax, Salem - no current information
- Indian Motorcycle Museum, Springfield,
- Kendall Whaling Museum, Sharon, closed in 2001 as a public museum, now archive and research center, collections now reside at New Bedford Whaling Museum
- National Plastics Center & Museum, Leominster, closed in 2008
- New England Fire and History Museum, Brewster
- Old Colony & Fall River Railroad Museum, Fall River, closed in September 2016 after years of low attendance. All railcar exhibits moved to other museums or sold to railroads.
- Plymouth Wax Museum, Plymouth, Cape Cod Visitor information,
- Santarella, Tyringham, also formerly known as Henry Kitson Museum and Sculpture Gardens, no longer operates as a museum or gallery
- Porter Thermometer Museum, Onset, reported closed in 2012, photos
- Revolving Museum, Lowell, closed in 2012
- Thornton W. Burgess Museum, East Sandwich, closed in 2013
- Words & Pictures Museum in Northampton
- Yesteryear's Doll Museum, Sandwich

== See also ==
- List of museums in Boston, Massachusetts
- Nature centers in Massachusetts
- List of historical societies in Massachusetts
