= West Schoolhouse =

West Schoolhouse may refer to:

- West Schoolhouse (Dennis, Massachusetts), listed on the National Register of Historic Places (NRHP) in Barnstable County
- West Schoolhouse (Wilmington, Massachusetts), NRHP-listed in Middlesex County

== See also ==
- West School (disambiguation)
