= Old Castle =

Old Castle may refer to:

- Old Castle (Stuttgart), a building in Stuttgart, Germany
- Hohenbaden Castle in Baden-Baden, Germany
- Old Castle (Rockport, Massachusetts), a historic house
- The Old Castle, a movement from Pictures at an Exhibition by Modest Mussorgsky

== See also ==
- Oldcastle (disambiguation)
