= West School =

West School can refer to:

- West School (Burlington, Massachusetts), listed on the National Register of Historic Places (NRHP) in Middlesex County
- West School (Crooksville, Ohio), NRHP-listed in Perry County
- West School (Stoughton, Wisconsin), NRHP-listed in Dane County

== See also ==
- West Schoolhouse (disambiguation)
