= Oldcastle =

Oldcastle may refer to:

== Places ==
- Oldcastle, Bridgend, Wales, a ward
- Oldcastle, Cheshire, England, a parish
- Oldcastle, County Meath, Ireland, a town
- Oldcastle, Monmouthshire, Wales, a village
- Oldcastle, Ontario, Canada, an unincorporated community

== People with the surname ==
- Sir John Oldcastle, a supporter of the Lollards in the 15th century
  - Sir John Oldcastle, a play about him

== Other uses ==
- Oldcastle Revolt, a revolt led by John Oldcastle

== See also ==
- Old Castle (disambiguation)
