= North Adams Museum of History and Science =

Museum in Massachusetts, United States

Coordinates: 42.69692°N 73.11448°W

The North Adams Museum of History and Science was established by the North Adams Historical Society in 1988 to display their collections. The museum was originally located on State Street in North Adams, Massachusetts as part of the historic Western Gateway Heritage State Park. The State Street location closed in 2018. The museum then moved to the first floor of the Holiday Inn in North Adams, but had to move from that space and closed in January, 2022. The collections are currently in storage. Some items are on display at the City Hall and other locations in North Adams. See the North Adams Historical Society's website for current exhibits and events. https://northadamshistoricalsociety.org/
