= List of museums in Boston =

This list of museums in Boston, Massachusetts, is a list of museums (including nonprofit organizations, government entities, and private businesses) that collect and care for objects of cultural, artistic, scientific, or historical interest and make their collections or related exhibits available for public viewing. Museums that exist only in cyberspace are not included. Also included are non-profit and university art galleries.

== Museums ==
Name	Neighborhood	Type	Notes
Abiel Smith School	Beacon Hill	African American	Part of Museum of African American History, first public school for free blacks
African Meeting House	Beacon Hill	African American	Part of Museum of African American History
Ancient & Honorable Artillery Company Museum	Downtown Boston	History	Military museum, JFK and Medal of Honor special exhibits, military relics, paintings, photographs, and library, located on the 4th floor of Faneuil Hall
Boston African American National Historic Site	Beacon Hill	African American	Interprets 15 pre-Civil War structures relating to the history of Boston's 19th-century African-American community, including the African Meeting House and the Abiel Smith School
Boston Athenæum	Beacon Hill	Multiple	Library and museum of art
Boston Children's Museum	South Boston	Children's	Located on Children's Wharf
Boston City Hall Galleries	Financial District	Art	website, Mayor's Gallery exhibits work by Boston artists, Scollay Square Gallery showcases arts organizations and artists community groups that support Boston artists
Boston Fire Museum	Financial District	Fire	
Boston National Historical Park	Boston	Historic sites	Revolutionary War trail in Boston and Charlestown, includes Old South Meeting House, Old State House, Faneuil Hall, Paul Revere House, Old North Church, Bunker Hill Monument, USS Constitution
Boston Public Library	Back Bay	Library	Changing exhibits of art and history from its collections at the Central Library, also at branch locations
Boston Tea Party Ships and Museum	South Boston	History	Reenactments, interactive exhibits, and two authentically restored ships
Boston University Art Galleries	Fenway–Kenmore	Art	website, Stone, 808, Annex, and Sherman Galleries
BSA Space	Financial District	Architecture	Changing exhibits of architecture and design by the Boston Society of Architects
Bunker Hill Monument	Charlestown	Military	Monument and museum about the 1775 Battle of Bunker Hill
Center for the History of Medicine	Longwood Medical and Academic Area	Medical	Rotating exhibits about the history of medicine from the collections of the Countway Library of Medicine
Commonwealth Museum	Dorchester	History	State history, operated by the Massachusetts Archives
Edward M. Kennedy Institute for the United States Senate	Dorchester	History	Specialty museum and educational institution containing the only full-scale reproduction of the U.S. Senate Chamber.
Faneuil Hall	Downtown Boston	History	Marketplace and meeting hall during the American Revolution
Fort Warren	Georges Island	Military	Mid 19th-century fort and park
Gallery 360 at Northeastern University	Fenway–Kenmore	Art	website, located in Ell Hall
Gallery 5 at Emmanuel College	Longwood Medical and Academic Area	Art	website, exhibitions of work by professional artists, emerging artists, artist residents, outsider artists and Emmanuel College art students and alumni
Garner Center for Photographic Exhibitions	Fenway–Kenmore	Art	website, photography exhibitions by the New England School of Photography
Gibson House Museum	Back Bay	Historic house	1850-1870s period townhouse
Harbor Gallery at University of Massachusetts Boston	Dorchester	Art	website, student-run gallery in McCormack Hall
Huret and Spector Gallery at Emerson College	Boston Theater District	Art	website, located in the Tufte Performance Production Center (10 Boylston Place)
Institute of Contemporary Art, Boston	South Boston	Art	Contemporary art website
Isabella Stewart Gardner Museum	Fenway–Kenmore	Art	Includes European, Asian and American art, including paintings, sculpture, tapestries, and decorative arts
James Blake House	Dorchester	Historic house	Operated by the Dorchester Historical Society, 1661 house, oldest house in Boston
John F. Kennedy Library and Museum	Dorchester	Biographical	Presidential library and museum of John F. Kennedy
Lemuel Clap House	Dorchester	Historic house	Operated by the Dorchester Historical Society, mid 18th-century period house
Loring-Greenough House	Jamaica Plain	Historic house	18th-century period mansion
Mary Baker Eddy Library	Fenway–Kenmore	Multiple	Includes the Mapparium, a three-story, stained-glass globe, the Hall of Ideas and changing exhibits about relating to the life of Mary Baker Eddy
Mary L. Fifield Art Gallery at Bunker Hill Community College	Charlestown	Art	website
MassArt Art Museum at the Massachusetts College of Art and Design	Longwood Medical and Academic Area	Contemporary Art	website
Massachusetts College of Art and Design Galleries	Longwood Medical and Academic Area	Art	website, 9 galleries featuring mostly student work: Arnheim Gallery, Brant Gallery, Doran Gallery, Frances Euphemia Thompson Gallery, Godine Family Gallery, Student Life Gallery, Tower Gallery, and North Crackertorium Gallery
Massachusetts Historical Society	Back Bay	History	Exhibits from its collections of American history, life and culture
Museum of African American History	Beacon Hill	African American	Includes the African Meeting House and Abiel Smith School
Museum of Fine Arts, Boston	Fenway–Kenmore	Art	Contains over 450,000 works of art
Museum of Science, Boston	Downtown Boston	Science	Includes over 500 interactive exhibits, 100 animals, planetarium and IMAX theater
Museum of the National Center of Afro-American Artists	Roxbury	Art	Contemporary and historical expressive arts from the global Black world, located in Abbotsford house
Nichols House Museum	Beacon Hill	Historic house	Turn-of-the-century townhouse with period rooms
Old North Church	North End	Historic site	18th-century church, location from which the famous "One if by land, and two if by sea" signal is said to have been sent in 1775
Old South Meeting House	Financial District	History	Operated by Revolutionary Spaces, Organizing point for the Boston Tea Party, includes museum
Old State House Museum	Financial District	History	Operated by Revolutionary Spaces, 18th-century Colonial state house, served as the first state house for the newly formed Commonwealth of Massachusetts
Otis House Museum	West End	Historic house	Owned by Historic New England, also known as Harrison Gray Otis House, post-Revolutionary house
Paul Revere House	North End	Historic house	Late 17th-century period house, home of American Revolutionary patriot Paul Revere, also adjacent Pierce–Hichborn House
Photographic Resource Center	Fenway–Kenmore	Art	website, photography and related media
Pierce House	Dorchester	Historic house	Owned by Historic New England, 17th-century period house, open twice a year
Roxbury Heritage State Park	Roxbury	Historic house	1750 Dillaway–Thomas House restored to show how it changed over two centuries
Russell Museum of Medical History and Innovation	West End	Medical	website explores history of medicine and health care at Massachusetts General Hospital
Shirley-Eustis House	Roxbury	Historic house	Restored 18th-century mansion of Royal Governor William Shirley
The Sports Museum	West End	Sports	Celebrates Boston sports, located in TD Garden
Suffolk University Gallery	Downtown Boston	Art	website, exhibition space for the New England School of Art and Design in the former Paine Furniture Building
Trustman Art Gallery at Simmons University	Longwood Medical and Academic Area	Art	website, professional and student work
USS Cassin Young	Charlestown	Maritime	World War II destroyer museum ship
USS Constitution	Charlestown	Maritime	"Old Ironsides", wooden-hulled, three-masted heavy frigate of the United States Navy, launched in 1797
USS Constitution Museum	Charlestown	Maritime	Privately run museum is located at the former Charlestown Navy Yard near the US Navy's USS Constitution
Vilna Shul	Beacon Hill	Ethnic	Boston's center for Jewish culture
Warren Anatomical Museum	Longwood Medical and Academic Area	Medical	Housed in Harvard Medical School's Countway Library of Medicine
Waterworks Museum, Boston	Allston–Brighton	Technology	website, late 19th-century former pumping station for the Chestnut Hill Reservoir
West End Museum	West End	Local History	West End neighborhood history and culture
William Clapp House	Dorchester	Historic house	19th-century house, home of the Dorchester Historical Society
William Hickling Prescott House	Beacon Hill	Historic house	Operated by The National Society of the Colonial Dames of America, 19th-century home of author William Hickling Prescott

== Defunct museums ==
- Boston Marine Museum
- Boston Museum (theatre)
- The Boston Museum
- Chinese Museum (Boston)
- Columbian Museum
- The Computer Museum, Boston
- Linnaean Society of New England
- Market Museum (Boston)
- New England Museum of Natural History
- New-England Museum (Boston)

== See also ==
- List of museums in Massachusetts
- Franklin Park Zoo
- New England Aquarium
- Sites of interest in Boston
