= Old Town Hall (Athol, Massachusetts) =

- U.S. National Register of Historic Places
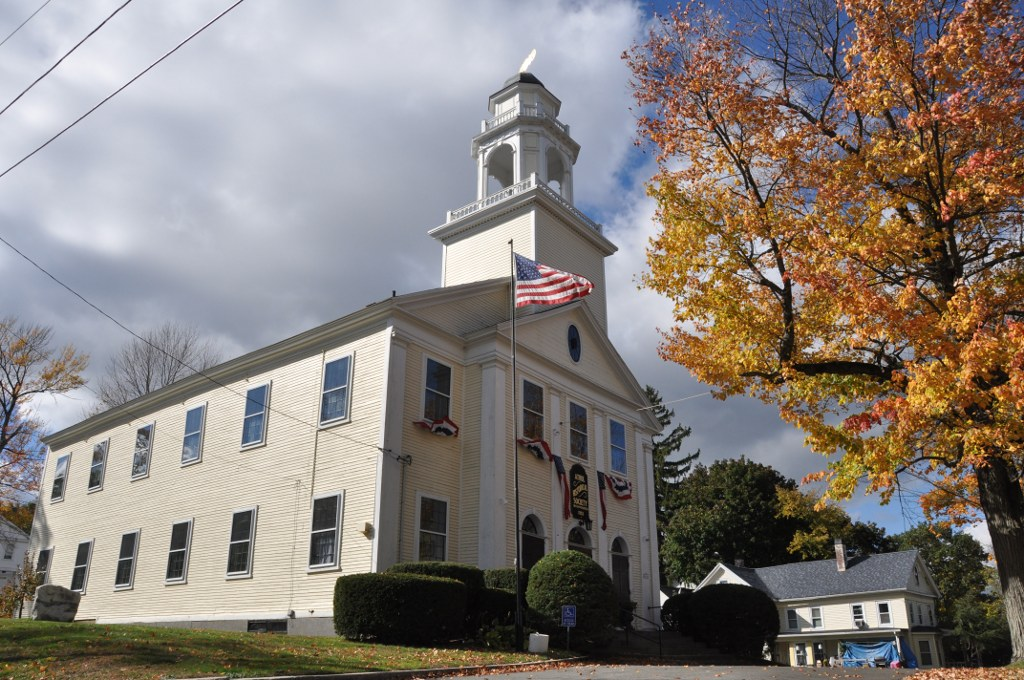

- Location within Massachusetts Location within the United States
- Location: 1307 Main St., Athol, Massachusetts
- Coordinates: 42°35′32″N 72°13′5″W
- Area: less than one acre
- Built: 1828
- Architectural style: Federal
- NRHP reference No.: 87000876
- Added to NRHP: June 17, 1987

Old Town Hall is a historic town hall in Athol, Massachusetts. Built in 1828 as a church, it served as town hall from 1847 to 1957, and now houses the local historical society. It is architecturally a good example of Federal period civic/religious architecture of the period. It was added to the National Register of Historic Places in 1987.

== Description and history ==
The Old Town Hall is located southwest of Athol's commercial downtown, at the northwest corner of Main Street and Liberty Street. It is a 2 1/2-story wood-frame structure, with a gabled roof and clapboarded exterior. The front facade is five bays wide, with the center three projecting with a lower-profile pedimented gable that has an oval window at its center. The building corners are pilastered. A three-stage tower rises to a cupola and weathervane. The interior houses the meeting space on the ground floor.

The hall was built as the town's fourth meeting house in 1828, after the third, which had stood nearby, was destroyed by fire. It was built for a Unitarian splinter of the town's original congregation, and remained in that use until it was turned over to the town in 1847. The building originally had a two-story meeting space, with a gallery on three sides (a typical period meeting house); the gallery was converted into a full second story by the town. It was used exclusively for town functions until 1921. A Women's Club occupied part of the building between 1921 and 1957, which continued to be used occasionally for meetings and as a polling place. The town gave the building to the Athol Historical Society in 1957, which uses it as a museum and storage facility. It remains an important tourist attraction for Athol and is included in their historical trail. The building features a display of local historic artifacts and is open to the public on Sunday afternoons in June and July.

== See also ==
- National Register of Historic Places listings in Worcester County, Massachusetts
