= Sewall-Scripture House =

Historic house in Massachusetts, United States

- U.S. National Register of Historic Places
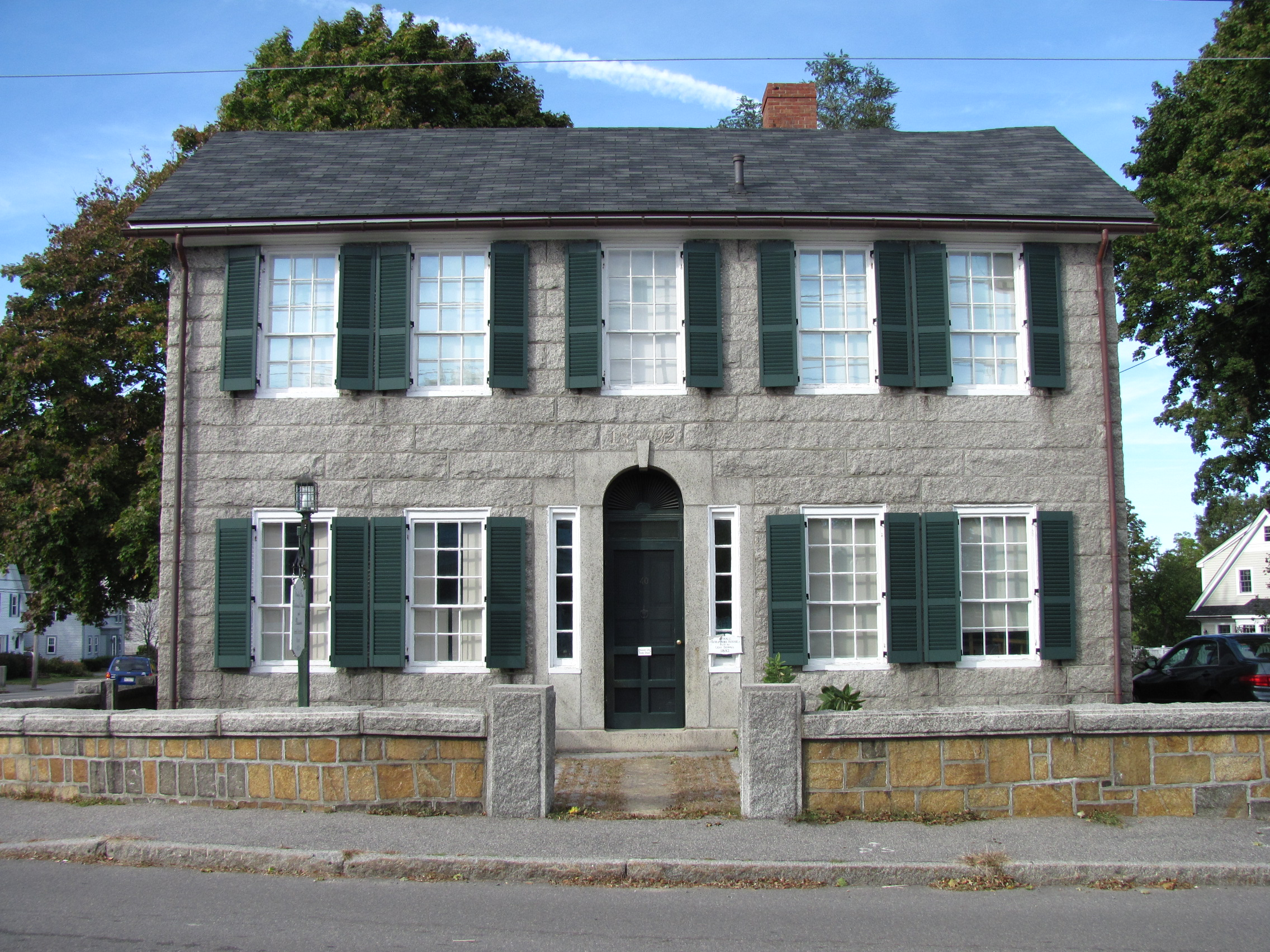
- Sewall-Scripture House

- Location within Massachusetts Location within the United States
- Location: 40 King St., Rockport, Massachusetts
- Coordinates: 42°39′27″N 70°37′37″W
- Area: less than one acre
- Built: 1832
- Architectural style: Federal
- NRHP reference No.: 82001902
- Added to NRHP: September 30, 1982

The Sewall-Scripture House, is a historic house museum in Rockport, Massachusetts that is owned by the Sandy Bay Historical Society. The Sewall Scripture Museum features antiques, period artifacts and items of local history. The Federal style building, the only house in Rockport built out of native granite, was added to the National Register of Historic Places in 1982.

== Description and history ==
The Sewall-Scripture House is set at the northeast corner of King and Granite Streets (the latter designated Massachusetts Route 127), on the outskirts of Rockport's main village. It is a 2 1/2-story structure with a side-gable roof, whose main block is constructed out of locally quarried granite. The front and side walls are formed out of dressed blocks about 1 by 4 feet (0.30 m × 1.22 m) in size; the rear wall is formed out of coursed random and square rubblestone. A 2 1/2-story wood-frame ell, apparently original to the house's construction, extends to the rear; it is finished in wooden clapboards. The main facade is five bays wide, with a central entry set in a round-arch opening with flanking sidelight windows.

The house was built in 1832 by Levi Sewall, owner of a granite quarry located on Pigeon Cove. Stone for this house was hauled from the quarry by teams of oxen. Sewall was one of Rockport's leading quarry owners, his business operating independently until its merger in 1921 with the Rockport Granite Company. Sewall's descendants owned the house until 1957, at which time it was acquired by the Sandy Bay Historical Society. Although there are a number of commercial buildings in Rockport built from local stone, this is the only house that is.

== See also ==
- National Register of Historic Places listings in Essex County, Massachusetts
