= Harnden Tavern =

- U.S. National Register of Historic Places
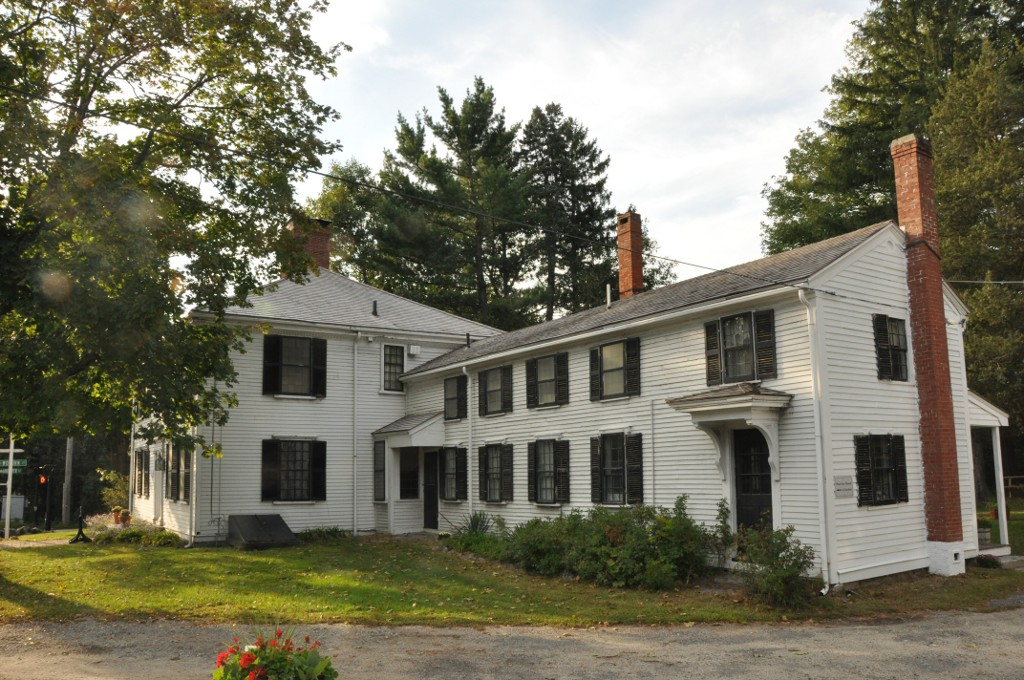

- Location within Massachusetts Location within the United States
- Location: Wilmington, Massachusetts
- Coordinates: 42°34′46″N 71°8′52″W
- Built: 1770
- Architect: Jones, Ebenezer
- Architectural style: Georgian
- NRHP reference No.: 75000293
- Added to NRHP: April 8, 1975

The Harnden Tavern, also known as the Col. Joshua Harnden Tavern, is a historic tavern that was built in 1770 at 430 Salem Street in Wilmington, Massachusetts.

The Col. Joshua Harnden Tavern was built during the last third of the eighteenth century in the town of Wilmington, Massachusetts. The site is on Lot No. One in the "Land of Nod," in the most northerly part of the Charlestown Grant. This imposing structure is an excellent surviving example of late-Georgian architecture. Joshua Harnden was the great-grandson of Richard Harnden, the first Englishman to settle in what is now North Wilmington. Joshua and his wife Sarah (Cornell) and their six children were the first family to occupy this house. During the Revolutionary War, Joshua served in Capt. Timothy Walker's Militia Co. Later he attained the rank of colonel shortly before his retirement. Joshua was elected to serve the Town of Wilmington as one of its three selectmen. After the Revolutionary War, he opened his home to the public as an inn or tavern. Col. Harnden died on September 9, 1807. His wife died on August 9, 1816. The property was sold to Dr. Silas Brown in 1818. It remained in the Brown - Hathaway family for 125 years. There is credible tradition that the tavern was used as a station on the Underground Railroad prior to the Civil War.

The building was taken by the town by eminent domain in 1973, and presently houses the Wilmington Town Museum.

The building was listed on the National Register of Historic Places in 1975.

== See also ==
- National Register of Historic Places listings in Middlesex County, Massachusetts
