= Pratt Historic Building =

- U.S. National Register of Historic Places
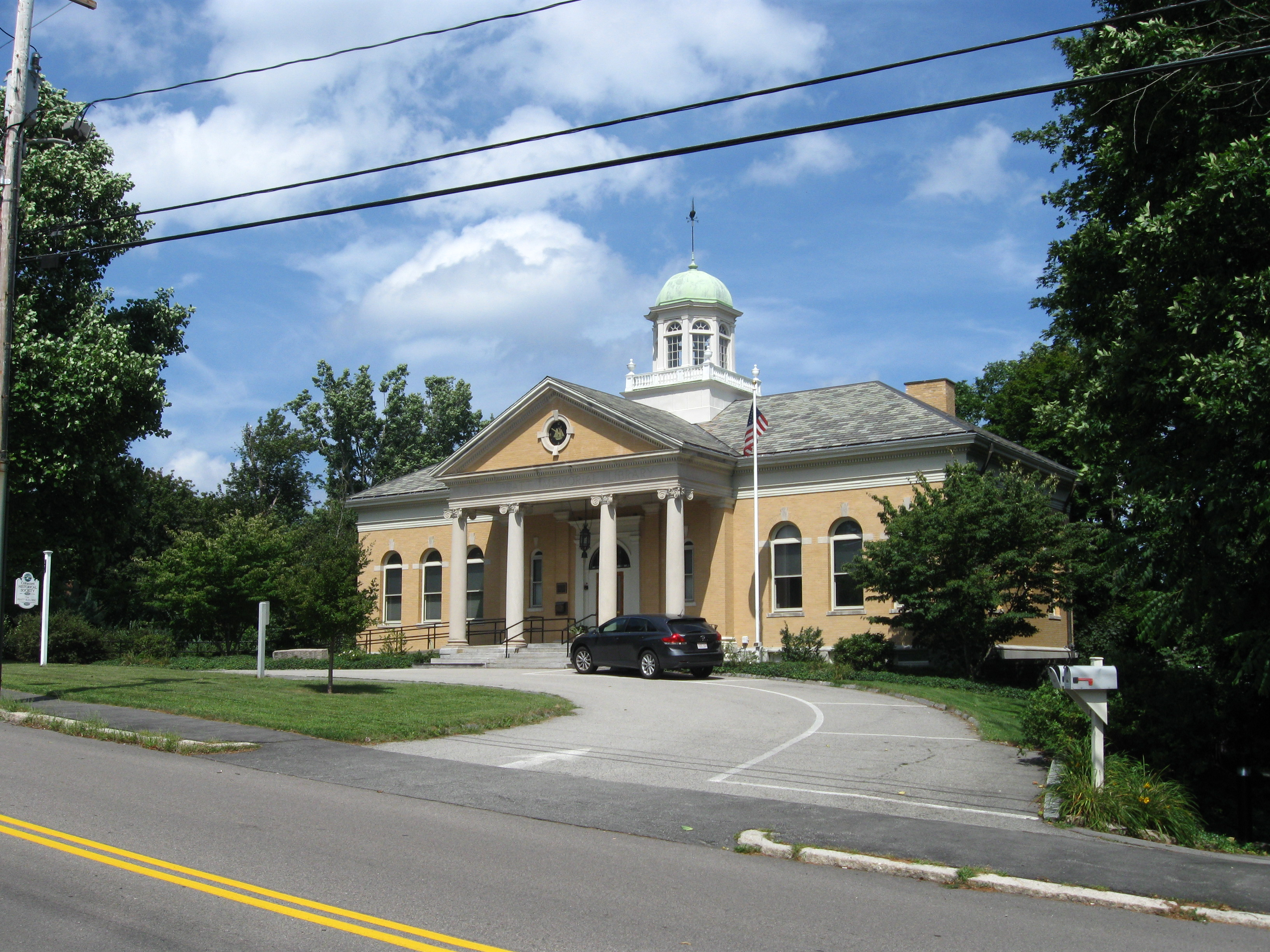

- Location within Massachusetts Location within the United States
- Location: Cohasset, Massachusetts
- Coordinates: 42°14′19.5″N 70°47′58.7″W
- Built: 1902
- Architect: Nichols, Edward; Reddie, MacIvor
- Architectural style: Colonial Revival
- NRHP reference No.: 06000816
- Added to NRHP: September 7, 2006

The Pratt Historic Building is a historic building at 106 South Main Street in Cohasset, Massachusetts, United States. It was built in 1903 with private donations as the Paul Pratt Memorial Library, to house the town's 7,500-volume collection. The building was expanded in the 1960s and '70s. In 2003, the library moved to a new site on Ripley Road, in the former Joseph Osgood Elementary School.

The building now serves as the headquarters and main museum of the Cohasset Historical Society. The Society also operates the Capt. John Wilson House and Bates Ship Chandlery museums in the summer.

The building was added to the National Register of Historic Places in 2006.

== See also ==
- National Register of Historic Places listings in Norfolk County, Massachusetts
