= Nantucket Life-Saving Museum =

Museum om Nantucket

The Nantucket Shipwreck & Lifesaving Museum
- Location: Nantucket
- Coordinates: 41.2912°N 70.0448°W
- Type: Museum
- Collection size: 5,000+
- Director: Egan Maritime Institute
- Website: http://www.nantucketshipwreck.org

The Nantucket Shipwreck & Lifesaving Museum of Nantucket, Massachusetts is a small, seasonal, non-profit museum dedicated to the history of shipwrecks off the Nantucket coast and in Nantucket Sound.

== History ==
The Lifesaving Museum is operated by the Egan Maritime Institute. It is located at 158 Polpis Road on Nantucket, 3 miles east of town, which is about a 20-minute drive from town. The building itself sits beside Folger's Marsh and is modeled after period life saving stations.

== Exhibits ==
The museum features over 5,000 objects and memorabilia gathered from local shipwrecks from the past 300 years. The collection includes period surfboats, beach carts, Fresnel lenses from Brant Point and Great Point lights, vintage photographs, models of lifesaving stations throughout the island of Nantucket, and models of ships that have wrecked in the past few centuries. Exhibits and programs also include images, films, videos, and lectures about storms at sea causing over 700 shipwrecks around Nantucket.
