= Tuttle Square School =

- U.S. National Register of Historic Places
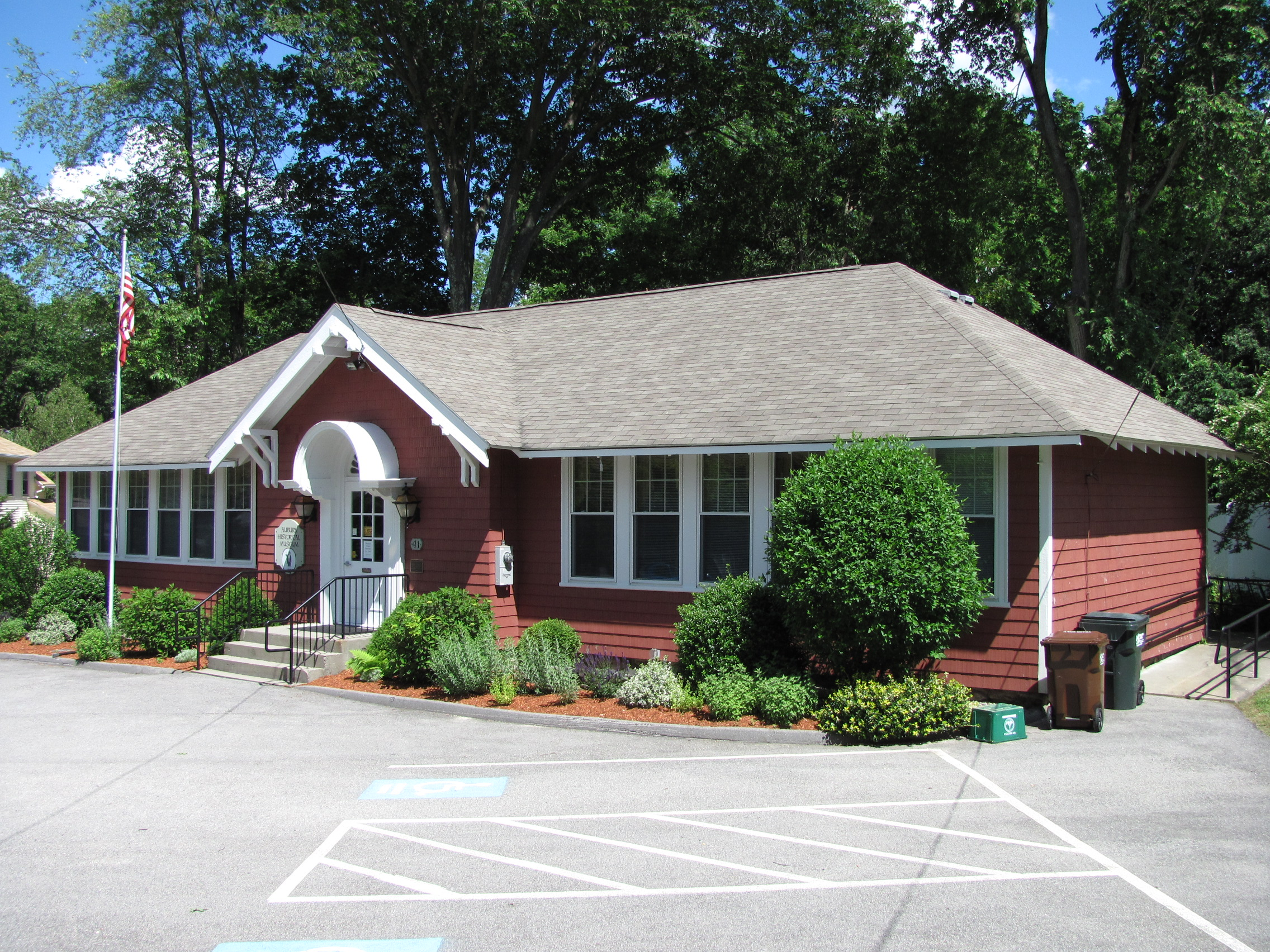
- Tuttle Square School

- Location within Massachusetts Location within the United States
- Location: Auburn, Massachusetts
- Coordinates: 42.1914°N 71.835°W
- Built: 1922
- Architect: Meacham, Harry L.
- Architectural style: Bungalow/Craftsman
- NRHP reference No.: 02000129
- Added to NRHP: March 8, 2002

The Tuttle Square School, now the Auburn Historical Museum, is a historic school building at 41 South Street in Auburn, Massachusetts. The single story two-room wood-frame building was constructed in 1922 to replace a smaller school on the site, in the face of increasing school population. The building's most prominent decorative feature is its Federal-style entry door surround, with pilasters supporting scrolled brackets, topped by a fanlight. The school served the Auburn public schools from 1923 to 1933. During the Second World War it was outfitted as a hospital in case of emergency, and briefly returned to use as a school between 1948 and 1953. Thereafter its primary purpose was to house school administrative office, and was finally vacated by the school administration in 1981. It then served as home to the Auburn District Nursing Association until about 1990. In 1999 the town voted to lease the building to the Auburn Historical Society for use as a museum.

The building was listed on the National Register of Historic Places in 2002.

== See also ==
- National Register of Historic Places listings in Worcester County, Massachusetts
