= Cadman–White–Handy House =

Historic house in Massachusetts, United States

- U.S. National Register of Historic Places
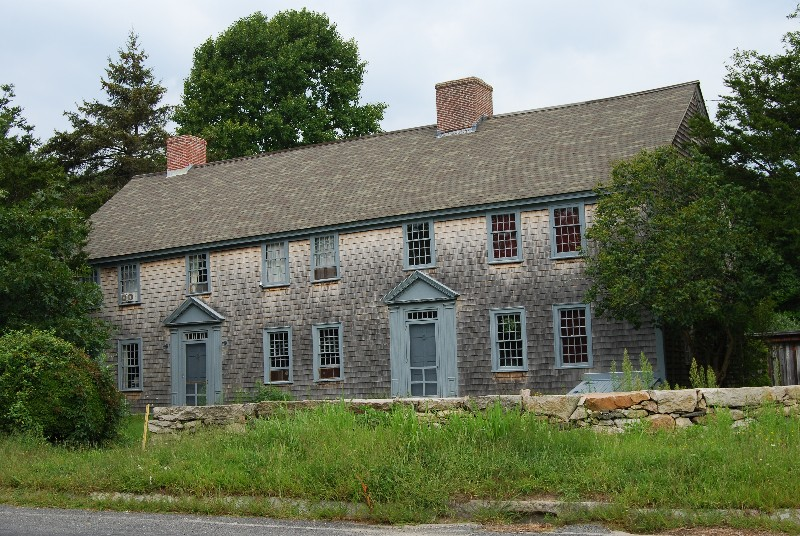

- Location within Massachusetts Location within the United States
- Location: 202 Hixbridge Road, Westport, Massachusetts
- Coordinates: 41°34′18″N 71°4′36″W
- Built: 1710
- Architectural style: Colonial, Georgian
- NRHP reference No.: 92000831
- Added to NRHP: July 16, 1992

The Cadman–White–Handy House, also known as the Handy House, is a historic house museum in Westport, Massachusetts. The house, built in stages between about 1710 and 1825, provides a window into architectural trends of 18th-century southern Massachusetts. The house is operated as a museum by the Westport Historical, and is open on some Saturdays between June and October. It was listed on the National Register of Historic Places in 1992.

== Description and history ==
The Handy House is located in central Westport, at the northwest corner of Hixbridge and Drift Roads, near the western bank of the East Branch Westport River. Both roads are historically old, with the east-west Drift Road based on a former Indian trail. The house is a 2 1/2-story wood-frame structure, with a side-gable roof and clapboarded exterior. It has an eight-bay front facade, with entrances in the second and fifth bays from the left. Both are framed by Federal style surrounds, with pilasters, four-light transom windows, and gabled pediments.

The house was probably built in three stages, beginning c. 1710. The oldest portion consists of the rightmost three bays, and probably formed a typical early Rhode Island stone ender. The central two bays were added between 1730 and 1750, giving the house a traditional Georgian five-bay facade with center entry. In 1825, the left three bays were added, and the exterior was given its present Federal styling. The building interior has preserved elements from all three periods of constructions, despite restylings during the 18th and 19th centuries.

The house is owned by the Westport Historical Society and operated as a historic house museum. It is mostly unfurnished, and visitors are able to examine the 18th and 19th-century building techniques and decorative elements.

== See also ==
- National Register of Historic Places listings in Bristol County, Massachusetts
