= Amherst Center for Russian Culture =

Coordinates: 42.3725°N 72.5185°W

The Amherst Center for Russian Culture was created by Amherst College in Amherst, Massachusetts after the gift of a major collection of Russian books, manuscripts, periodicals and ephemera by Thomas P. Whitney in 1991. The Center has a particularly strong collection of works by and relating to Russian emigres. Subsequent major gifts of material have come from Dmitri Tarasenkov and George Ivask.

The center has a gallery for the display of over 50 works of Russian art from the collection that was donated to the college by Thomas P. Whitney.
