= West School (Burlington, Massachusetts) =

- U.S. National Register of Historic Places
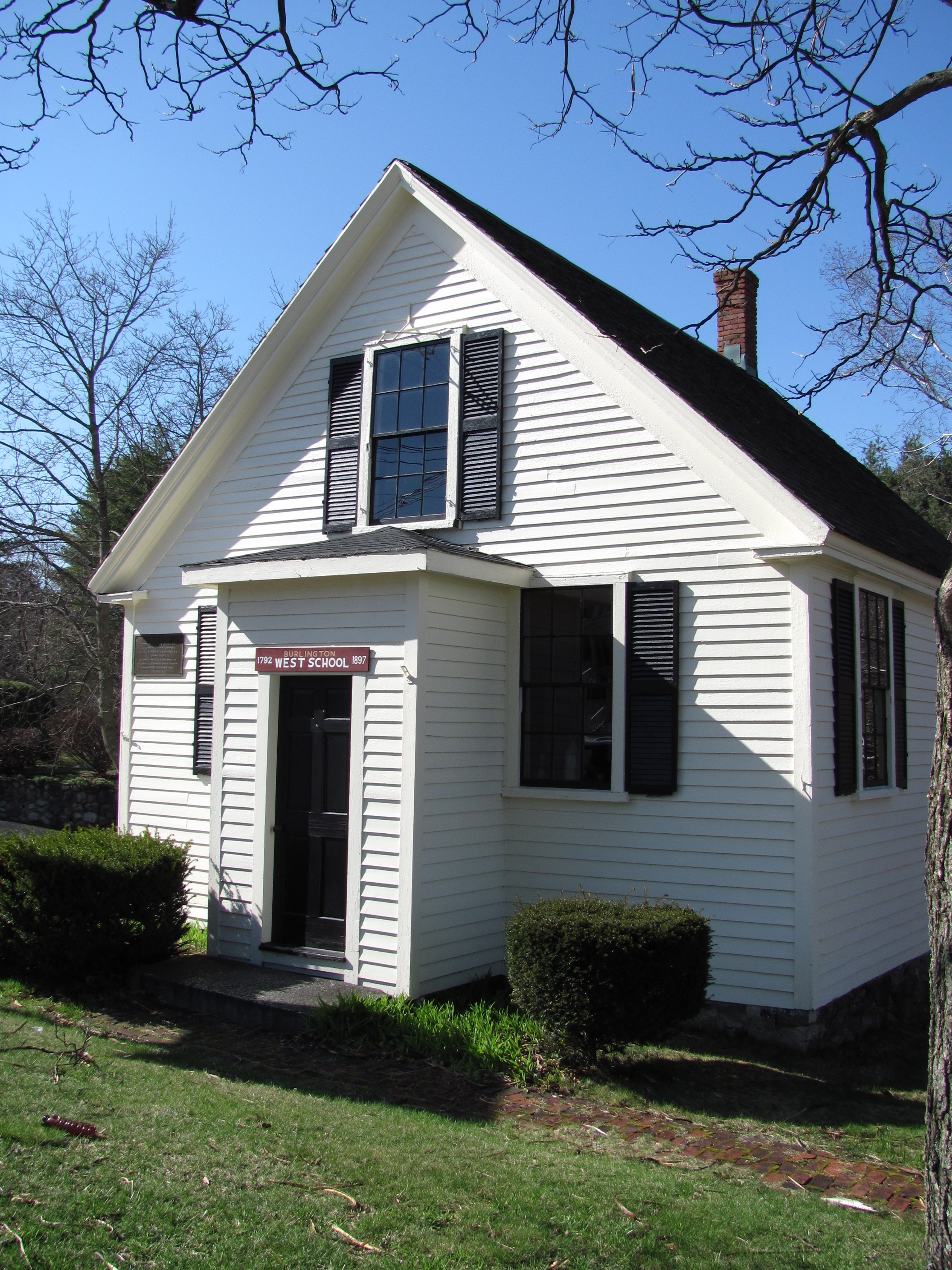
- West School

- Location within Massachusetts Location within the United States
- Location: Burlington, Massachusetts
- Coordinates: 42°30′22″N 71°13′12″W
- Built: 1799
- Architectural style: Federal, Greek Revival
- NRHP reference No.: 06000398
- Added to NRHP: May 17, 2006

The West School is a historic school building at 106 Bedford Street in Burlington, Massachusetts. The one-room schoolhouse was built in 1794–5, when the area was still part of Woburn. The building was originally located in what is now Simonds Park in the center of Burlington, but was moved to its present location in 1839 to serve as the school for the western part of town. It served as a public school at 1897. After serving for a time as a garage, the building was rehabilitated by the local historical society in 1964. Of four Woburn-built 18th century school buildings in Burlington, this is the only one to survive. The building is a well-preserved example of Federal and Greek Revival styling.

The building was listed on the National Register of Historic Places in 2006.

== See also ==
- National Register of Historic Places listings in Middlesex County, Massachusetts
