= West Schoolhouse (Dennis, Massachusetts) =

- U.S. National Register of Historic Places
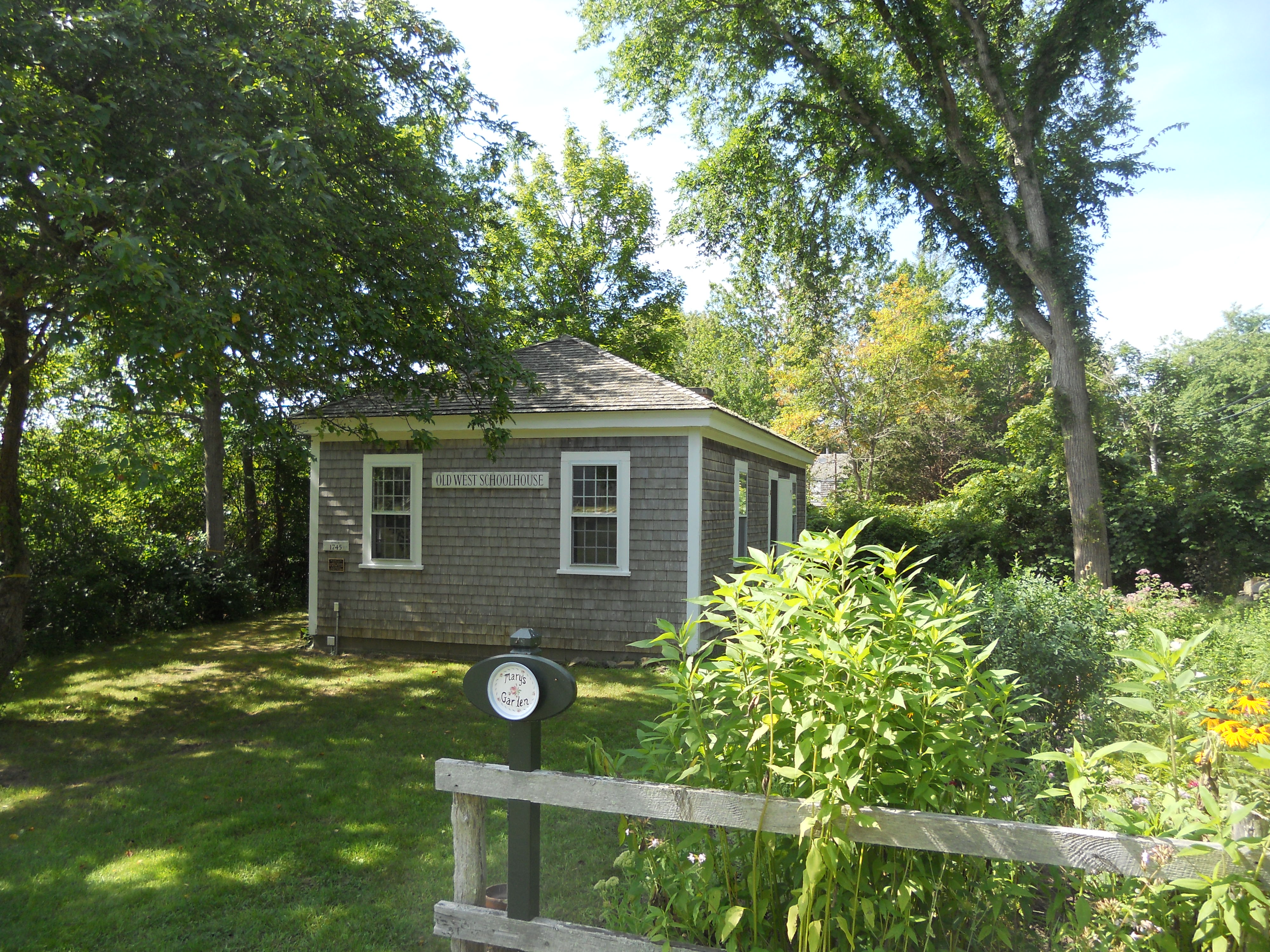

- Location within Cape Cod Location within Massachusetts Location within the United States
- Location: Dennis, Massachusetts
- Coordinates: 41°44′20″N 70°11′59″W
- Built: 1770
- Architect: N. Stone
- NRHP reference No.: 75000262
- Added to NRHP: April 24, 1975

The West Schoolhouse is a historic school building at 61 Whig Street in Dennis, Massachusetts. Built c. 1770–75, this one-room schoolhouse is the oldest in Dennis. It served as a schoolhouse until 1865, and was moved to its present location in 1973. It is the only one of Dennis's twelve district schools that is still standing. It is now on the grounds of the Josiah Dennis House, a museum property operated by the Dennis Historical Society.

The building was listed on the National Register of Historic Places in 1975.

== See also ==
- National Register of Historic Places listings in Barnstable County, Massachusetts
