= Witch History Museum =

Museum on the Salem witch trials

Coordinates: 42°31′16.3″N 70°53′38.4″W

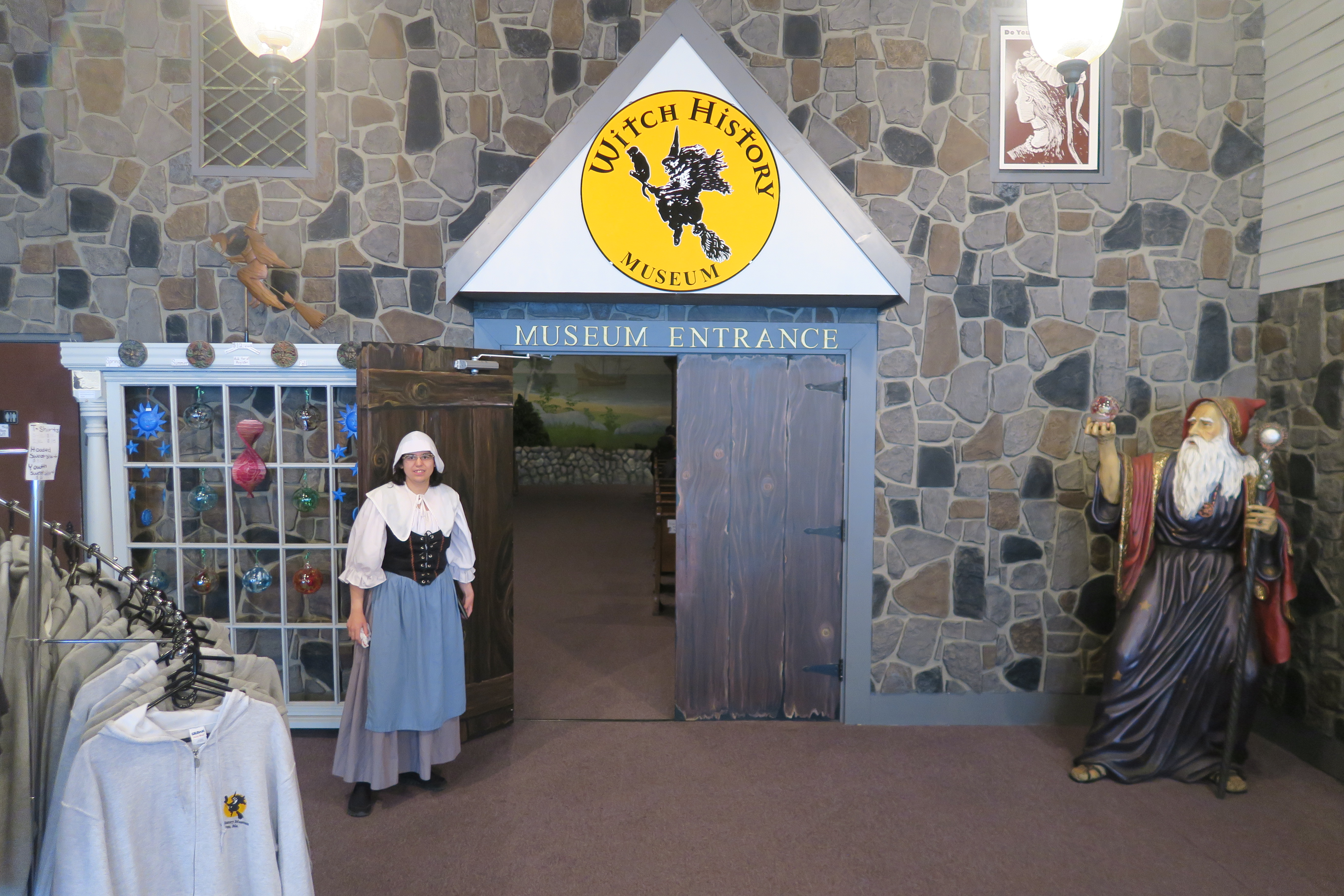
Witch History Museum

The Witch History Museum is located in Salem, Massachusetts and features dioramas and first person narrations, including little-known information about nineteen accused "witches" that were put to death in 1692. The museum covers the hysteria surrounding the events.

== See also ==
- Medical explanations of bewitchment
- Salem Witchcraft Trials at Authentic Society
