= Josiah Dennis House =

Historic house in Massachusetts, United States

- Josiah Dennis Manse
- U.S. National Register of Historic Places
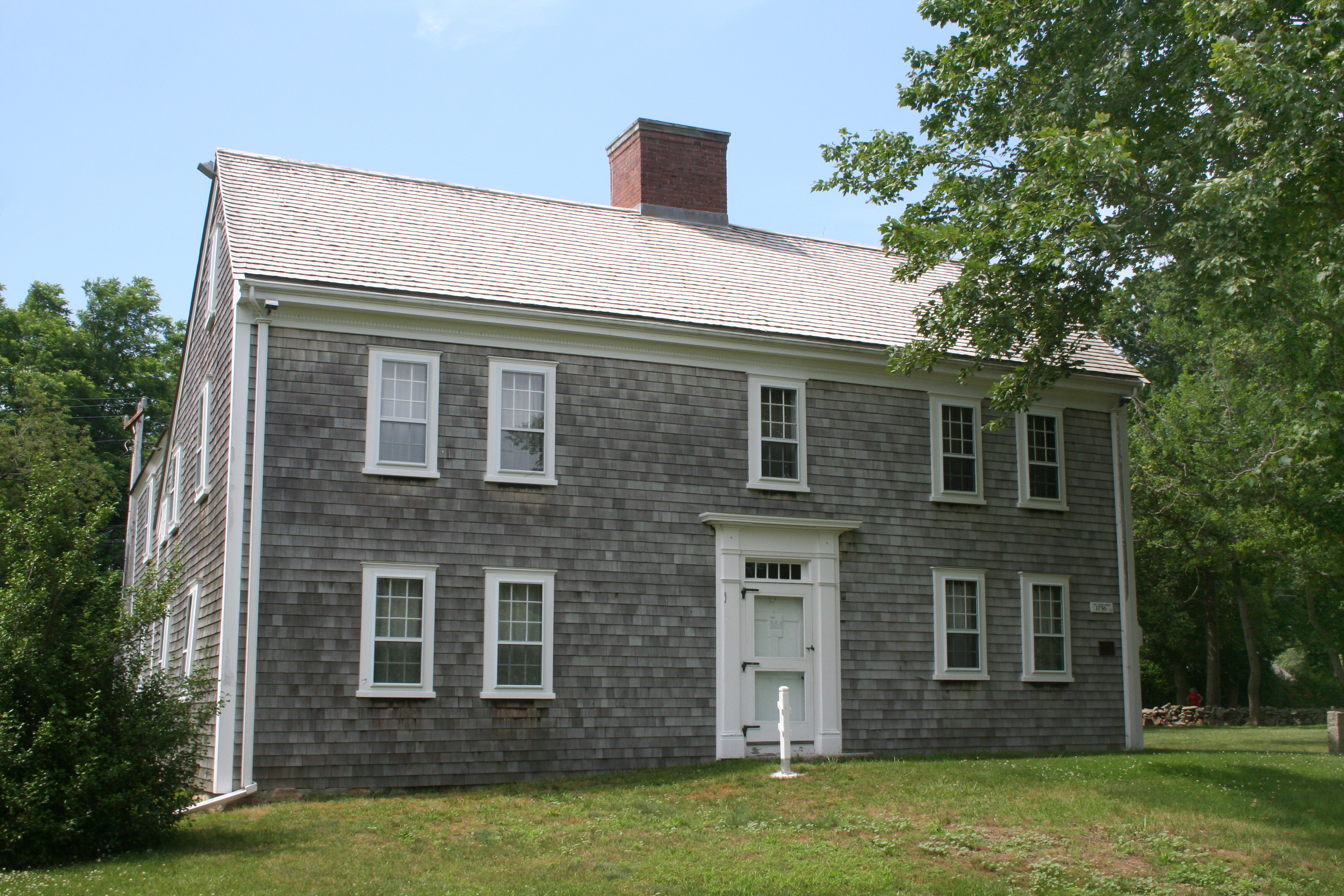

- Location within Cape Cod Location within Massachusetts Location within the United States
- Location: 61 Whig Street, Dennis, Massachusetts
- Coordinates: 41°44′25″N 70°11′58″W
- Built: 1736
- NRHP reference No.: 74000360
- Added to NRHP: February 15, 1974

The Josiah Dennis Manse Museum is a historic house at 61 Whig Street in Dennis, Massachusetts. The 2 1/2-story timber frame saltbox house was built c. 1736 as a home for Rev. Josiah Dennis, the first minister of the East Yarmouth Parish, as the Dennis area was then known. The Rev. Dennis was the minister for 38 years, and it is for him that the town is named. The Dennis Historical Society owns and operates the house as the Josiah Dennis Manse Museum, an 18th-century historic house museum. The house, located at the intersection with Nobscussett Road, is open on Tuesdays and Thursdays in the summer. The property also includes the West Schoolhouse, the town's only surviving district school building.

The house was listed on the National Register of Historic Places in 1974.

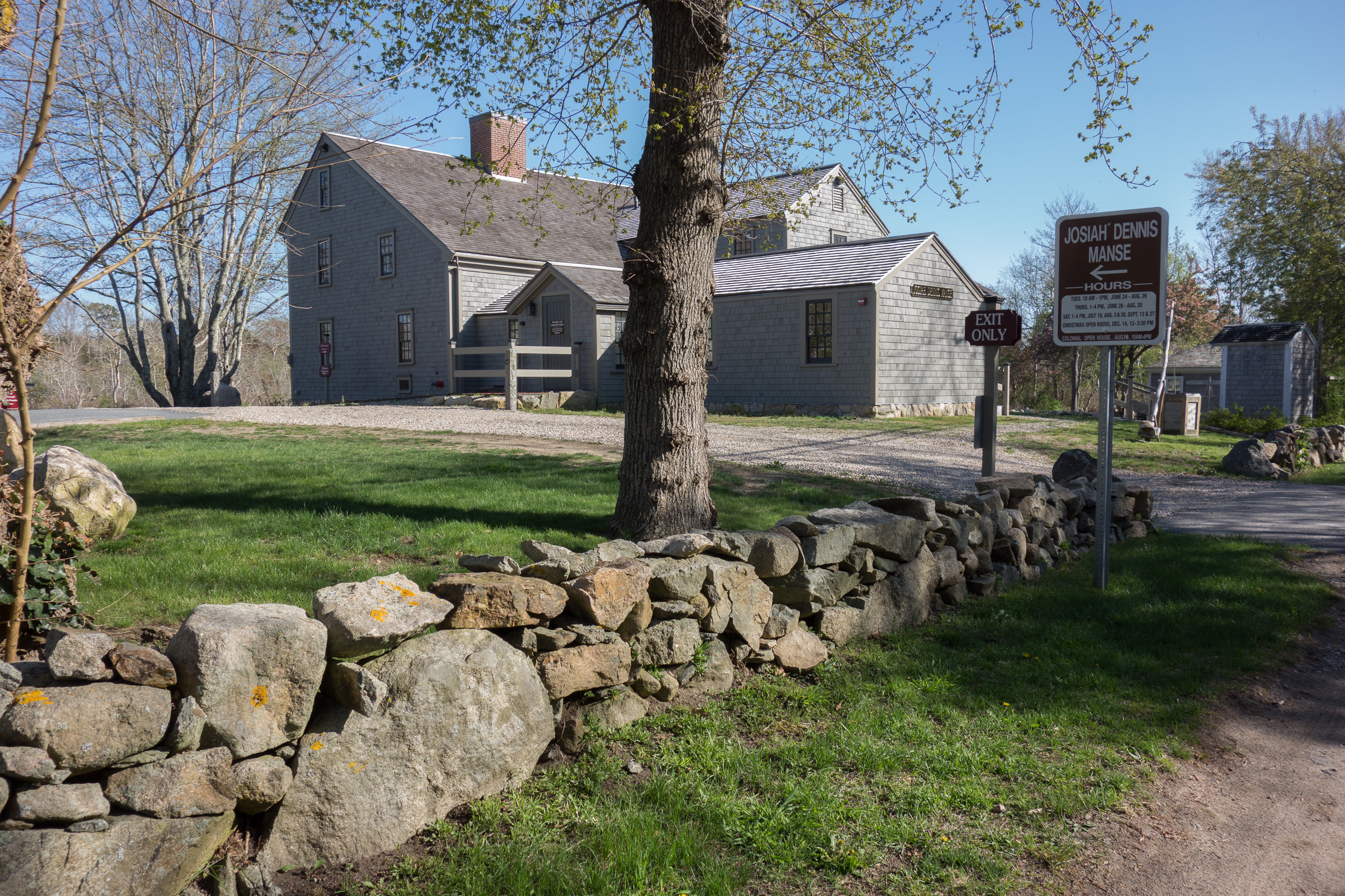
The house in 2014

== See also ==
- National Register of Historic Places listings in Barnstable County, Massachusetts
