= Capt. John Wilson House and Bates Ship Chandlery =

Historic house in Massachusetts, United States

- U.S. National Register of Historic Places
- U.S. Historic district
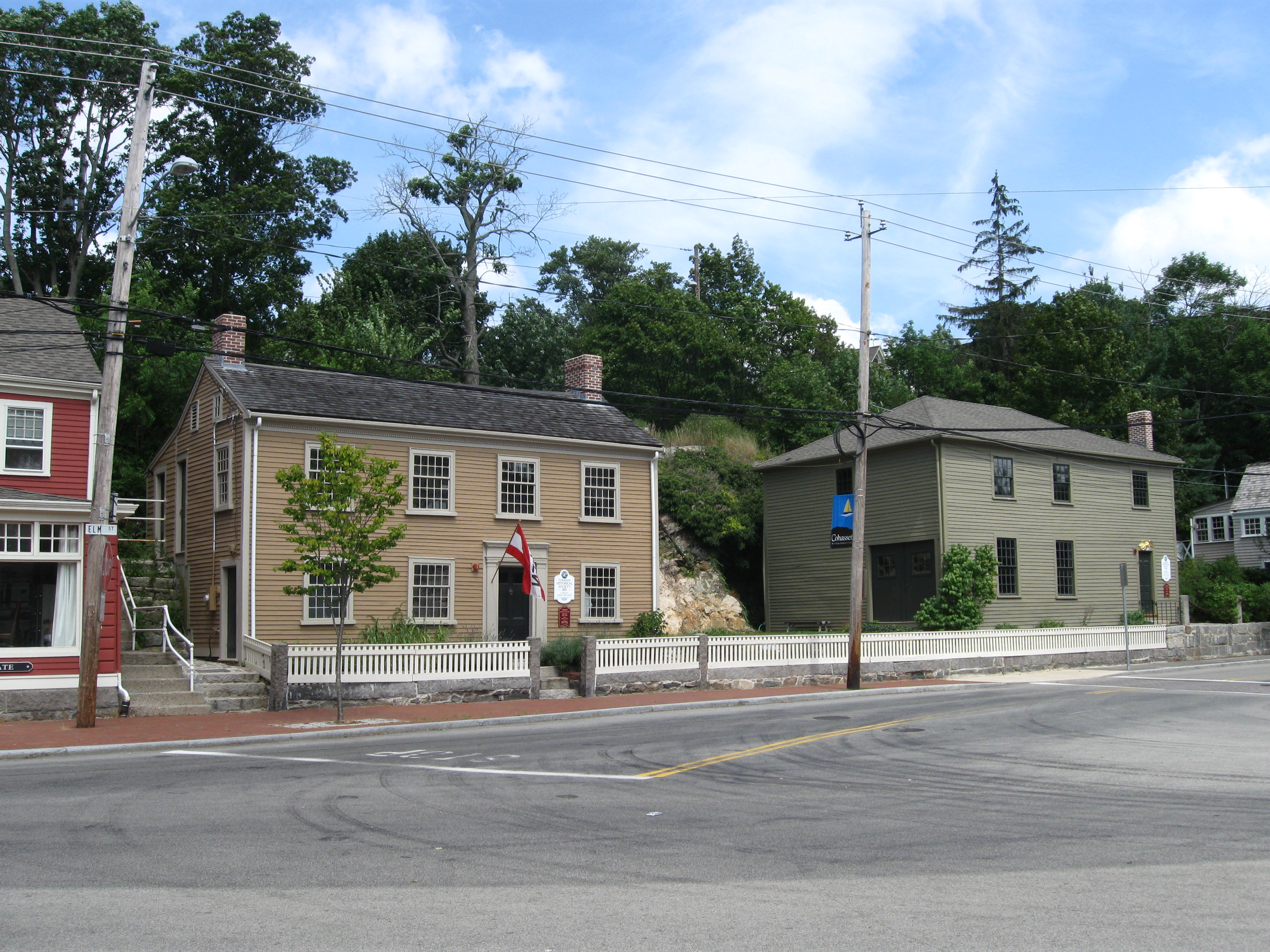
- Wilson House (l.) and Bates Chandlery (r.)

- Location within Massachusetts Location within the United States
- Location: Cohasset, Massachusetts
- Coordinates: 42°14′26.8″N 70°48′6″W
- Area: less than one acre
- Built: 1754
- Architect: Nicholas, David
- Architectural style: Federal, Greek Revival
- NRHP reference No.: 02001614
- Added to NRHP: December 27, 2002

The Capt. John Wilson House and Bates Ship Chandlery are historic buildings at 4 Elm Street in Cohasset, Massachusetts. They are now owned by the Cohasset Historical Society. Open in the summer, the Captain John Wilson House is now a historic house museum, and the Chandlery houses displays about the town's maritime heritage. They were added to the National Register of Historic Places in 2002.

== Description ==
The two buildings are located in Cohasset's downtown village area, on the north side of Elm Street near its junction with Main Street. They share a single lot, fronted by a garden and picket fence, with exposed ledge rising to the rear.

=== Wilson House ===
The Wilson House is a 2 1/2-story wood-frame building, four bays wide, with a side-gable roof, end chimneys, and clapboard siding. It has Federal period styling, including a front entry surround with pilasters and a dentillated cornice. A shingled shed-roof addition (c. 1830) extends to the rear, giving the house a saltbox profile. The interior is organized with a three-bay main room on the right, and a single-bay unfinished space on the left. A large fireplace projects into the main chamber, with a narrow staircase behind it providing access to the second floor.

The house was built about 1810 by David Nicholas, a local housewright, during a minor building boom, and was soon afterward sold to Captain John Wilson. Wilson supposedly operated a chandlery in the house, in addition to his career operating ships out of Cohasset Harbor. The house remained in the Wilson family until 1912, and was then adapted for commercial uses. In 1936 it was given to the Cohasset Historical Society.

=== Bates Ship Chandlery ===
The chandlery, located east of the house, is a two-story frame structure, with a hip roof and clapboard siding. The building was originally located opposite Bates Wharf on the waterfront, and was moved to its present location in 1957. It was built in 1754, and is the best-preserved remnant of Cohasset's early maritime history.

== See also ==
- Pratt Historic Building
- National Register of Historic Places listings in Norfolk County, Massachusetts
