= Western Gateway Heritage State Park =

State park in Massachusetts, United States

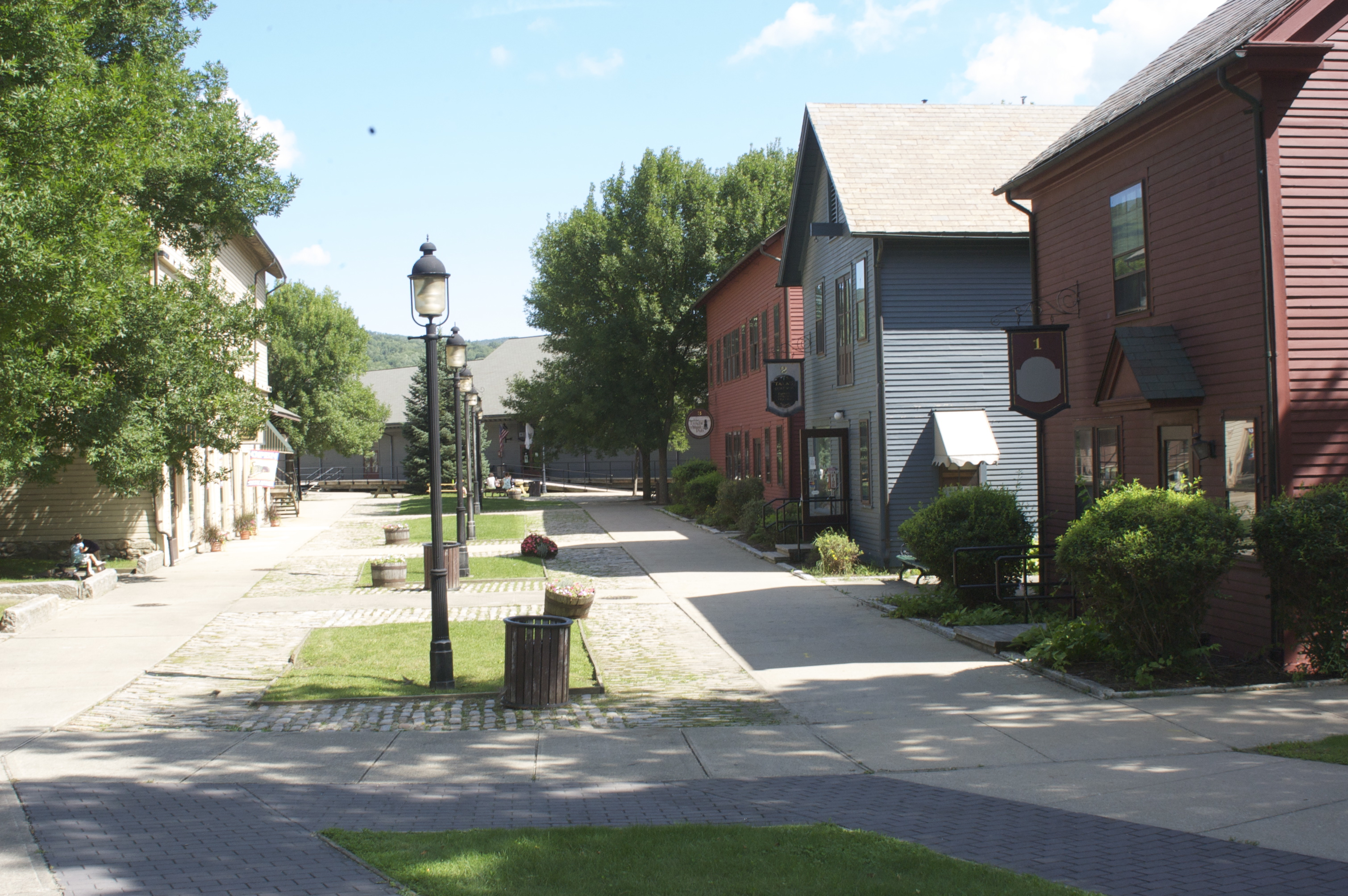

- Location within Massachusetts Location within the United States
- Location: North Adams, Massachusetts, United States
- Coordinates: 42°41′48″N 73°6′50″W
- Area: 8 acres (3.2 ha)
- Administrator: Massachusetts Department of Conservation and Recreation
- Website: Official website
- Freight Yard Historic District
- U.S. National Register of Historic Places
- U.S. Historic district
- Location: North Adams, Massachusetts
- Built: 1859
- Architect: various
- Architectural style: various
- NRHP reference No.: 72000131
- Added to NRHP: June 13, 1972

Western Gateway Heritage State Park was a history-focused Massachusetts state park in the city of North Adams managed by the Department of Conservation and Recreation. Exhibits at the park, which was located in a former railyard, told the story of the creation of the Hoosac Tunnel. The freight yard was listed on the National Register of Historic Places in 1972 as the Freight Yard Historic District.

== History ==
The city of North Adams was relatively isolated in the early 19th century, separated from the rest of Massachusetts to the east by Hoosac Mountain, and on the west by the Taconic Mountains. With the advent of the railroad in the late 1820s, proposals were developed for rail connections to other parts of Massachusetts and eastern New York. In 1846, the first rail connection was made, with Pittsfield to the south. The Troy and Greenfield Railroad was chartered in 1848 to develop a rail line that would connect Troy, New York, to Greenfield, Massachusetts, via North Adams and a tunnel through Hoosac Mountain. Work on the Hoosac Tunnel began in the 1850s, but it would not be completed until the 1870s; its construction alone provided an employment boom to North Adams.

Rail service between North Adams and Troy was inaugurated in 1859, with this rail yard as its eastern terminus. Between 1859 and the opening of the tunnel in 1875, this rail yard served as a freight and passenger depot. The focus of activity moved around the turn of the century across the Hoosic River to the Union Depot, while this rail yard continued to serve as a freight-handling and storage area. Portions of the railroad properties were subjected to urban renewal in the second half of the 20th century. In the 1980s, preservations restored the surviving properties and adapted some of them for use as a state park and museum. The park saw its grand opening celebrations during the summer of 1986.

== See also ==
- National Register of Historic Places listings in Berkshire County, Massachusetts
