= Old Castle (Rockport, Massachusetts) =

Historic house in Massachusetts, United States

- U.S. National Register of Historic Places
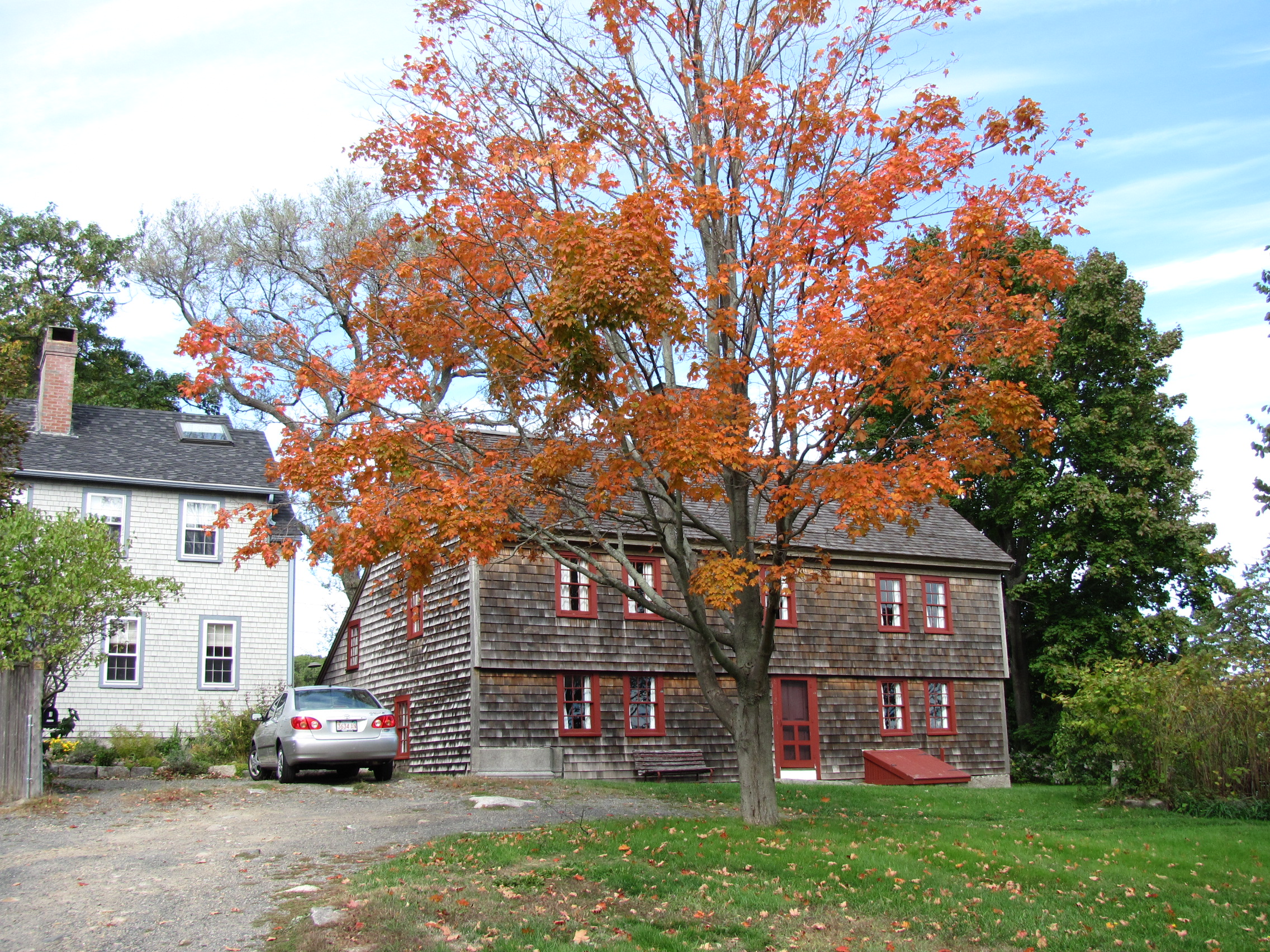
- Old Castle

- Location within Massachusetts Location within the United States
- Nearest city: Rockport, Massachusetts
- Coordinates: 42°40′35″N 70°37′31″W
- Built: 1715
- Architect: Jethro Wheeler
- NRHP reference No.: 78000466
- Added to NRHP: September 1, 1978

The Old Castle is a historic First Period house located on Castle Lane in Rockport, Massachusetts. The 2 1/2-story wood-frame house was probably built c. 1712 by Jethro Wheeler, in whose family it remained for six generations. It was sold out of the family in 1893 to Henry F. Story, and given to the Pigeon Cove Village Improvement Society in 1929. The house underwent some restoration at that time, and is now open during the summer as a historic house museum, operated by the Sandy Bay Historical Society.

The house was listed on the National Register of Historic Places in 1978.

== See also ==
- National Register of Historic Places listings in Essex County, Massachusetts
