= Newbury Historic District =

Historic district in Massachusetts, United States

- U.S. National Register of Historic Places
- U.S. Historic district
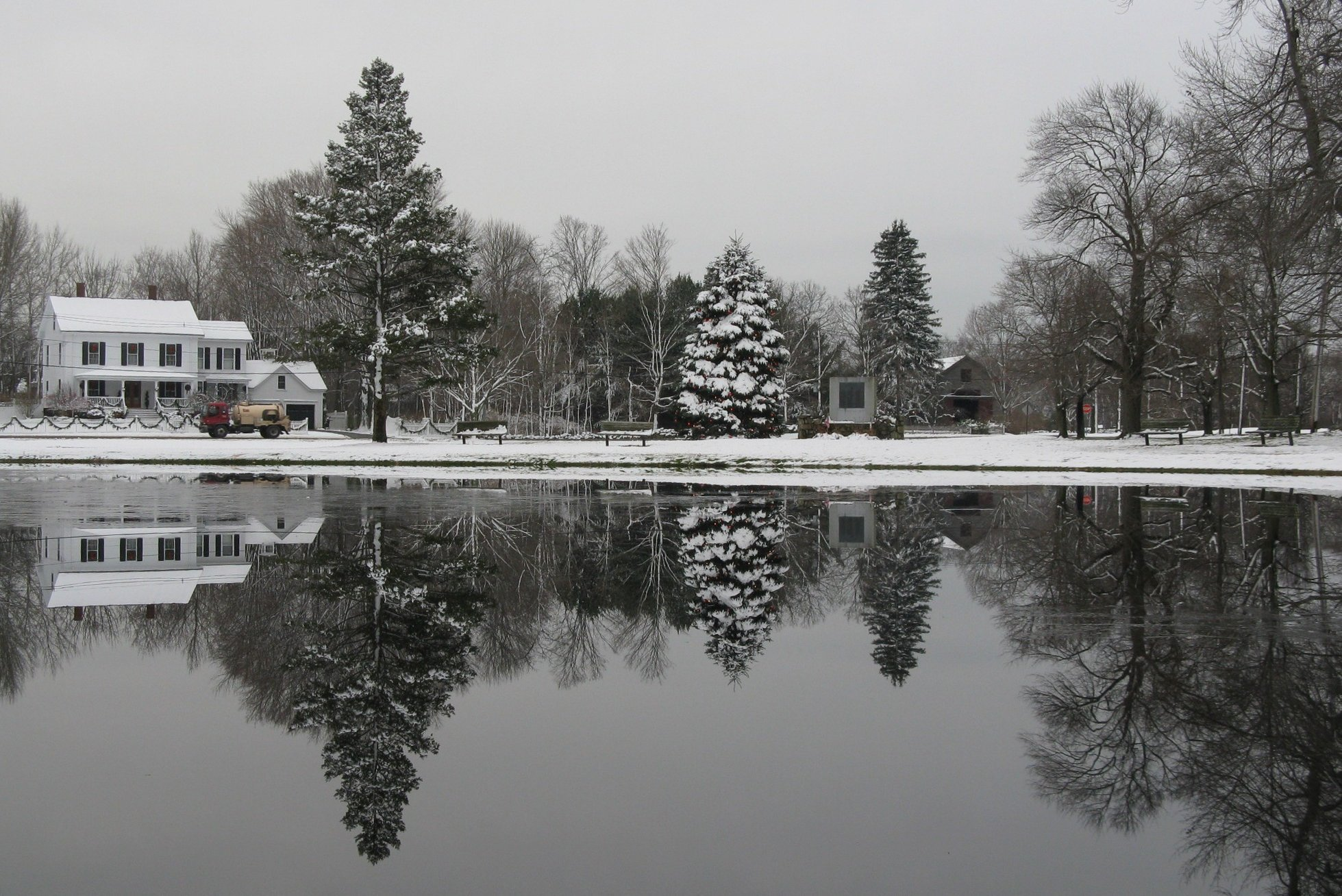
- Looking south across the pond on the Upper Green

- Location within Massachusetts Location within the United States
- Location: Newbury, Massachusetts
- Coordinates: 42°47′51″N 70°51′44″W
- Built: 1654
- Architectural style: Greek Revival
- NRHP reference No.: 76000275
- Added to NRHP: May 24, 1976

The Newbury Historic District encompasses the historic town center of Newbury, Massachusetts. Centered on the town's upper green, the area has a history of more than 350 years, and includes buildings dating to the 17th century. It extends from the green northward on High Street to the town line with Newburyport. It was listed on the National Register of Historic Places in 1976.

== Description and history ==
The town of Newbury was incorporated in 1635, with the original town center located around the Lower Green, about 2 1/2 miles to the south, on the banks of the Parker River. The present upper green was laid out in 1642 as a militia training ground, and became the new center of the town (which then included both Newburyport and West Newbury). The first meetinghouse was built in 1646 on a site at the green's northwest corner, where subsequent churches stood until the present 1869 First Parish Church was built across High Road. The First Parish Cemetery was also laid out in 1646, and is where many of Newbury's early settlers are buried. The green was used as an encampment side during the American Revolutionary War by forces under the command of Benedict Arnold, en route to Quebec in 1775.

The historic district is bounded on the south by the upper green, and the buildings that face it on High Road, Green Street, and Hanover Street. It then extends northward along High Road to the present town line with Newburyport (separated from Newbury in 1764). Most of the buildings in the district are residential wood-frame structures. Notable among these are the Swett-Ilsley House and the Coffin House, two 17th-century houses that are now museum properties of Historic New England. The district also includes Newbury's town hall (c. 1935) and the 1898 Woodbridge School, built on the homesite of the town's first schoolteacher, John Woodbridge.

== See also ==
- National Register of Historic Places listings in Essex County, Massachusetts
