= Standish Corner Historic District =

Historic district in Maine, United States

- U.S. National Register of Historic Places
- U.S. Historic district
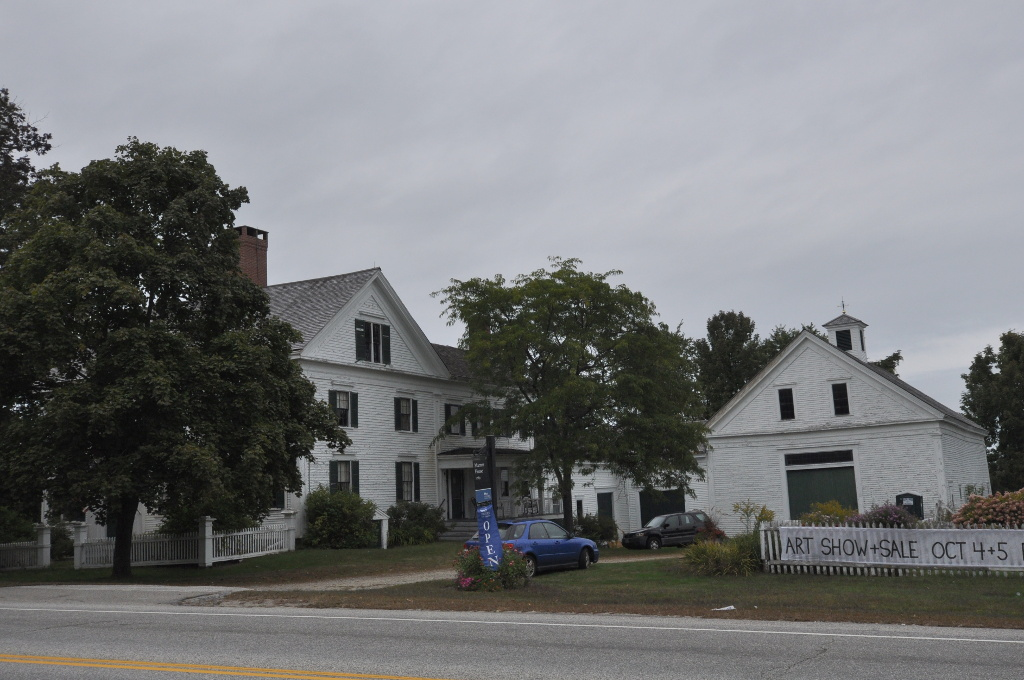
- The 1789 Marrett House

- Location within Maine Location within the United States
- Location: Jct. of ME 25/113 and ME 35, Standish, Maine
- Coordinates: 43°44′6″N 70°33′3″W
- Area: 8 acres (3.2 ha)
- Built: 1789
- Architectural style: Greek Revival, Federal
- NRHP reference No.: 93001117
- Added to NRHP: October 14, 1993

The Standish Corner Historic District encompasses a collection of five early farmhouses in the village of Standish Corner in southeastern Standish, Maine. All five houses were built in the late 18th or early 19th century, and the assemblage are all that survive of the town's original early center. The district was listed on the National Register of Historic Places in 1993.

== Description and history ==
The town of Standish was settled in the 1760s and incorporated in 1785, named in honor of Myles Standish. Its first meeting house was built in the Standish Corner area, then a crossroads on the main route between Portland and Fryeburg, and is thus where the town's early civic activities were focused. It was also a center of small-scale industrial activity, with several tanneries, lumber mills, and hotels, but this eventually declined in the second half of the 19th century, after the village was bypassed by the Portland and Ogdensburg Railway.

The five surviving houses of the village's early settlement period line both sides of East Ossipee Trail (SR 25), just south of its junction with SR 35. The oldest of the five houses is the 1789 Marrett House, named for the family of Rev. Daniel Marrett, which occupied the house into the early 20th century, when it was transformed into a historic house museum, now operated by Historic New England. Across the street from the Marrett House are three early 19th century houses, with Federal and Greek Revival styling. North of the Marrett House, right at the road junction stands a fifth house, dating to 1793.

== See also ==
- National Register of Historic Places listings in Cumberland County, Maine
