= Nathaniel Tracy =

American merchant and politician (1751–1796)

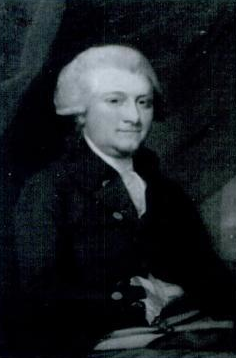

Member of the General Court of Massachusetts
- In office 1780–1782

Member of the Massachusetts Senate
- In office 1783–1783

Personal details
- Born: August 11, 1751 Newburyport, Massachusetts, U.S.
- Died: September 20, 1796 (aged 45) Newbury, Massachusetts, U.S.
- Spouse: Mary Lee (m. 1775)
- Children: 11
- Relatives: Jonathan Jackson (brother-in-law); Jeremiah Lee (father-in-law); William Raymond Lee (grandson)
- Education: Harvard College
- Occupation: Merchant; politician

Nathaniel Tracy (August 11, 1751 – September 20, 1796) was an American merchant, revolutionary, and politician. Starting off with a mercantile business with his brother and brother-in-law, he made more than $6.7 million offering services for the Revolutionary War. He also served in the General Court of Massachusetts and Massachusetts Senate during the early 1780s. He lost most of his fortune to wartime expenses, fraud, and bankruptcy, and he fell into poverty during the last few years of his life.

== Early life and career ==
Tracy was born on August 11, 1751, in Newburyport, Massachusetts. His parents were Patrick Tracy, an Irish immigrant from County Wexford who later made a fortune as a merchant, and his second wife Hannah Gookin. Through his mother, he was a great-great-grandson of settlers John Cotton and Daniel Gookin, as well as a cousin of Dorothy Quincy (wife of John Hancock). He had a younger brother, John, and a stepbrother, senator Tristram Dalton (son of his father's third wife Mary). Through his sister Hannah, he was brother-in-law of politician Jonathan Jackson.

Tracy was educated at Boston Latin School and Harvard College, where he obtained a BA in 1769 and MA in 1772. He joined the mercantile industry with both his brother and brother-in-law in the early 1770s, (Note: Sources vary if the exact year is 1772 or 1774.) with their company being named Jackson, Tracy, and Tracy, and lived in a brick house in his native Newburyport.

== Revolutionary War ==
Tracy was involved in the Revolutionary War, starting off in privateering. During the war, he outfitted 110 merchant ships, sent 2,800 men on 24 cruisers, captured in 2,200 prisoners of war from 120 vessels, making more than $6.7 million in profits. These profits allowed him to buy estates, including one confiscated from Loyalist John Vassall; located in Cambridge, it is now the Longfellow House–Washington's Headquarters National Historic Site. Among his campaigns included Benedict Arnold's unsuccessful expedition to Quebec, for which he provided vessels for transportation on the orders of General George Washington (later the first U.S. president).

Tracy was involved in local civic service throughout Massachusetts. He served in both the General Court of Massachusetts (1780, 1781 and 1782) and Massachusetts Senate (1783). He was also a member of Newburyport Selectboard (1780-1782) and Committee for Schools (1780), as well as the town's representative at the Massachusetts Constitutional Convention of 1779–1780, the master of the town's Masonic lodge, and a Governor Dummer Academy trustee. He was awarded an honorary master of arts degree by Princeton University in 1778, and elected fellow of the American Academy of Arts and Sciences in 1780.

Despite his initial success, Tracy's fortunes started declining within two years of the war. He lost the vast majority of his corporate vessels, with only thirteen surviving the war. He was left without promised pay for some of his business dealings (including with Diego de Gardoqui and possibly the Quebec expedition), and apparently did not pay loans. Furthermore, his major sources of funding, government subsidies and creditors, collapsed alongside the economy following the end of the war. Despite efforts such as a 1784 business trip to Europe (where he sailed alongside Thomas Jefferson, another future U.S. president), he declared bankruptcy by 1786 and sold the majority of his assets, including his Cambridge estate.

== Personal life and death ==
In 1775, Tracy married Mary Lee, whose father was fellow merchant Jeremiah Lee. The couple had eleven children:

- Hannah (1776-1823), married William Raymond Lee (1774-1861) in 1801; parents of William Raymond Lee
- Martha Lee (1777-1778)
- Patrick (fl. 1780-1791; died before 1819)
- Nathaniel (fl. 1781; died before 1788)
- Lieutenant Jeremiah Lee (bp. 1782 - 1844)
- Mary (1786-1809)
- Louisa (1787-1869)
- Nathaniel (1788 - died before 1780)
- Nathaniel (1790-1866), married Mary Wyer in 1818 and Anne M. Allen; a broker at the Merchants Exchange
- Martha Abby (1791 - died before 1819)
- Helen (1796-1865)

In relative poverty during his later life, Tracy was reduced to only one half of his Newburyport home. He later moved to the Spencer–Peirce–Little Farm in Newbury, which he later bought in exchange for his Newburyport home after inheriting ownership of the latter. Tracy died on September 20, 1796, at the farm.
