= First Harrison Gray Otis House =

Historic house in Massachusetts, United States

- U.S. National Register of Historic Places
- U.S. National Historic Landmark
- U.S. National Historic Landmark District – Contributing property
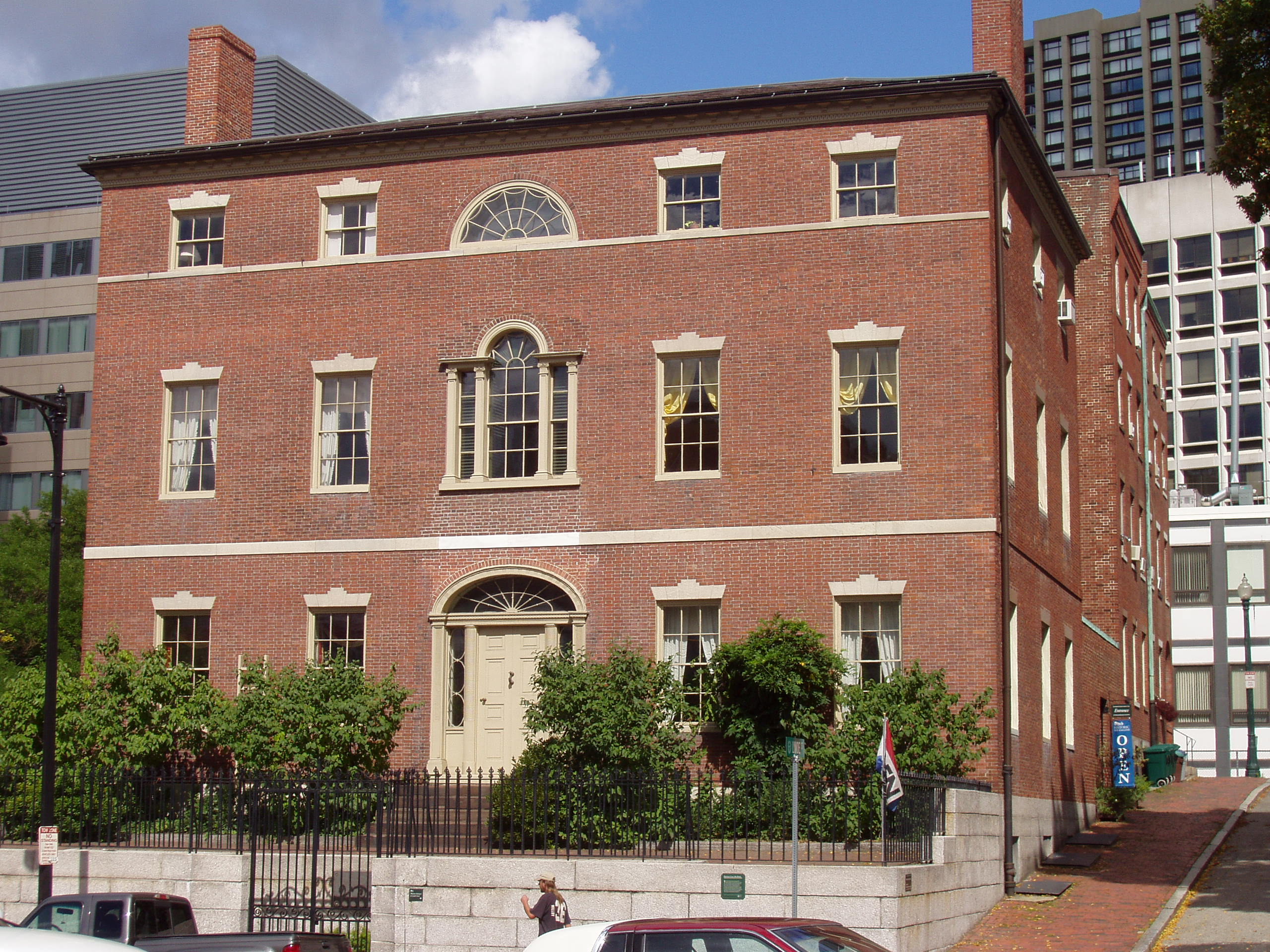
- First Harrison Gray Otis House

- Location within Boston Location within Massachusetts Location within the United States
- Location: 141 Cambridge Street, Boston, Massachusetts
- Coordinates: 42°21′40.75″N 71°3′52.38″W
- Built: 1795
- Architect: Charles Bulfinch
- Architectural style: Federal
- Part of: Beacon Hill Historic District (ID66000130)
- NRHP reference No.: 70000539

Significant dates
- Added to NRHP: December 30, 1970
- Designated NHL: December 30, 1970
- Designated NHLDCP: October 15, 1966

The First Harrison Gray Otis House is a historic house museum and National Historic Landmark at 141 Cambridge Street in the West End of Boston, Massachusetts. The house, built in 1795–96, was the first of three houses built for Massachusetts politician Harrison Gray Otis to designs by Charles Bulfinch. It is notable as one of the earliest three-story brick houses that came to represent the Federal style of architecture, and its interiors show the influence of Robert Adam. The house is now the headquarters of Historic New England, a regional preservation organization, and is open year-round for tours.

== Description and history ==
The house is the simplest of the three designed by Bulfinch for Otis. The design is said to be inspired by a William Bingham house that Bulfinch saw in 1789 in Philadelphia, which was in turned derived from a house in London. The house is three stories tall, five bays wide, with elegant string courses. Today's graceful entrance was added after 1801. Above it is a fine Palladian window, and above that a lunette. The third floor is very short; ceilings are just over six feet (1.8 m) tall. The floor plan follows a typical central hall plan, with two rooms on either side of the central hallway. The kitchen was in an ell.

The house was purchased in 1916 by the Society for the Preservation of New England Antiquities (now Historic New England) for use as its headquarters. It was originally located about 40 feet (12 m) forward of its present location, but was moved in the 1920s after it was threatened by the widening of Cambridge Street. The original cellar was lost during this move. The house is now connected to a group of row houses on Lynde Street, which serve as office and program space for Historic New England. The house underwent a careful restoration in 1960, overseen by Abbott Lowell Cummings. It is open year-round for tours.

== See also ==
- List of National Historic Landmarks in Boston
- National Register of Historic Places listings in northern Boston, Massachusetts
