= Joshua Coffin =

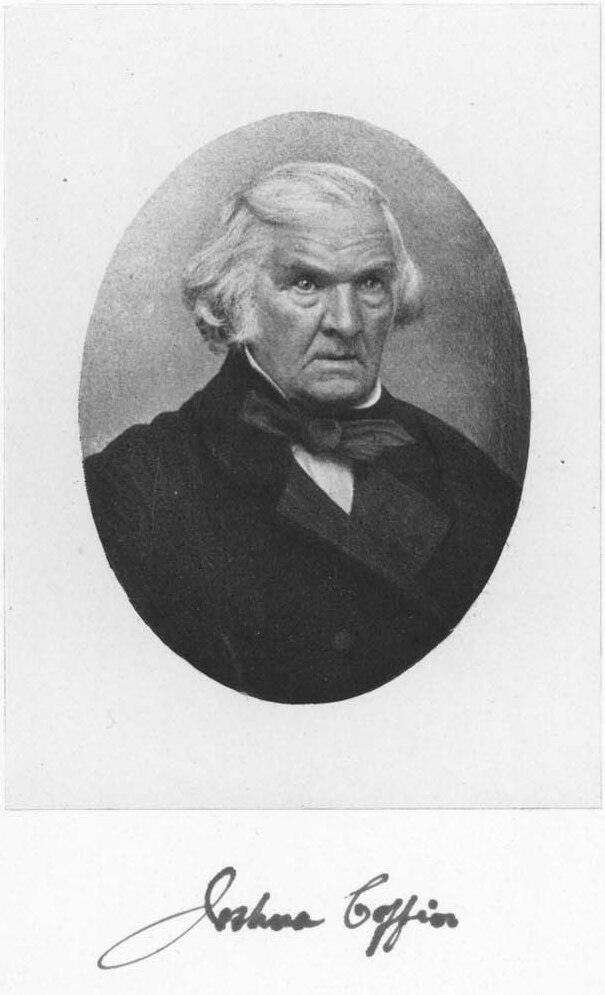
- Born: October 12, 1792; Newbury, Massachusetts, US
- Died: June 24, 1864 (aged 71); Newbury, Massachusetts, US
- Occupation: Teacher
- Known for: Antiquary and abolitionist
- Spouse(s): Clarissa Harlow Dutch (married 1817-1821), Anna Wood Wiley Chase (married 1835-)
- Children: 5
- Parent(s): Joseph and Judith (née Toppan) Coffin

Joshua Coffin (October 12, 1792 – June 24, 1864) was a historian, an American antiquary, and an abolitionist.

== Life ==
Coffin was born to Joseph and Judith (née Toppan) Coffin in Newbury, Massachusetts October 12, 1792 in the Coffin House. He graduated at Dartmouth College in 1817, and taught school for many years, numbering among his pupils the poet John Greenleaf Whittier, who addressed to him a poem entitled "To My Old School-Master".

Coffin was ardent in the cause of emancipation, and was one of the co-founders of the New England Anti-Slavery Society in 1832, being its first recording secretary. From 1834 to 1837, Coffin was the manager of the American Anti-Slavery Society.

He published The History of Ancient Newbury (Boston, 1845), genealogies of the Woodman, Little, and Toppan families, and magazine articles. As an adult, Coffin lived for a time in the downstairs southwest room of the Coffin House, his ancestral home; in a tiny study housed within an ell of the house, Joshua wrote his History of Ancient Newbury.

== Family life ==
On December 2, 1817, Coffin married his first wife Clarissa Dutch of Exeter, New Hampshire. They had two children together: Sarah Bartlett (born Nov. 21, 1818) and Lucia Tappan (born Sept. 6, 1820). His first wife died in 1821.

On April 20, 1835, Coffin married his second wife Mrs. Anna Wiley Chase, of Philadelphia, Pennsylvania. They had three children together: Elizabeth Wiley (born Jan. 26, 1836), Anna Lapsley (born July 17, 1838), and Mary Hale (born Dec. 29, 1840). Their three children were born in Philadelphia.

== Death ==
Coffin died on June 24, 1864, in Newbury, Massachusetts and is buried at the Newbury First Parish Burying Ground.
