= Winslow Crocker House =

Historic house in Yarmouth Port, Massachusetts

Coordinates: 41.704633°N 70.220923°W

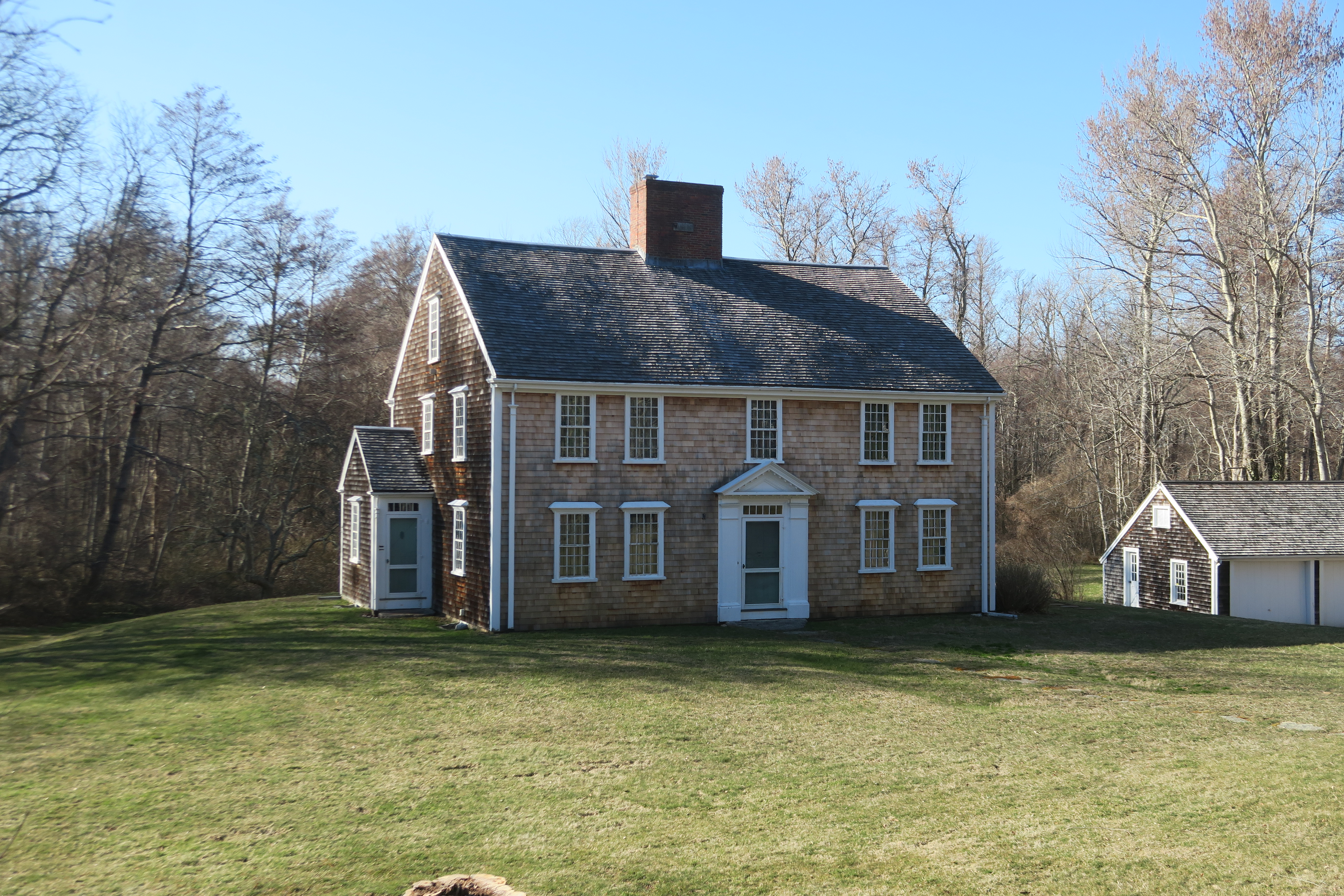
Winslow Crocker House

Winslow Crocker House is a historic house in Yarmouth Port, Massachusetts, built circa 1780. In 1936, Mary Thacher, an avid collector of antiques, moved the house of a wealthy 18th-century trader and land speculator, Winslow Crocker, to its present location.

Thacher remodeled the interior in order to provide an appropriate early American backdrop for the display of her collection. Woodwork was stripped, smaller-paned windows installed, and a fireplace rebuilt to contain a beehive oven. The result is a colonial Cape Cod house with a 20th-century flavor. Thacher's collection of furniture, accented by colorful hooked rugs, ceramics, and pewter, presents a thorough survey of early American styles, from Jacobean, William and Mary, and Queen Anne to Chippendale. Today the house is owned and operated as a historic museum by Historic New England.
