= Spencer–Peirce–Little Farm =

Coordinates: 42.79505°N 70.85205°W

- Spence–Peirce–Little House
- U.S. National Register of Historic Places
- U.S. National Historic Landmark
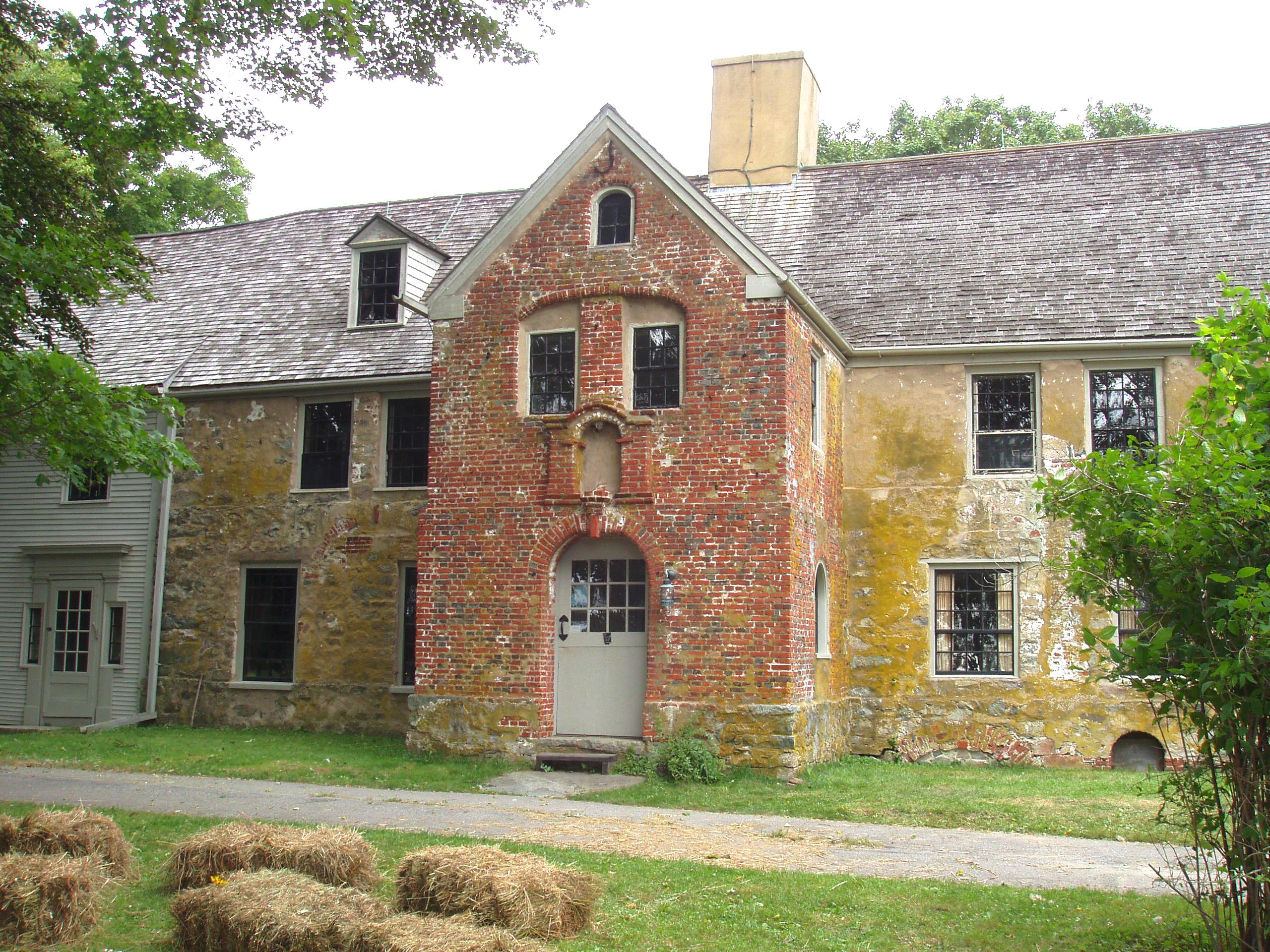
- Spencer–Peirce–Little Farm, Newbury, Massachusetts

- Location within Massachusetts Location within the United States
- Location: Newbury, Massachusetts
- Built: 1690 circa
- Architect: Peirce, Daniel
- NRHP reference No.: 68000043

Significant dates
- Added to NRHP: November 24, 1968
- Designated NHL: November 24, 1968

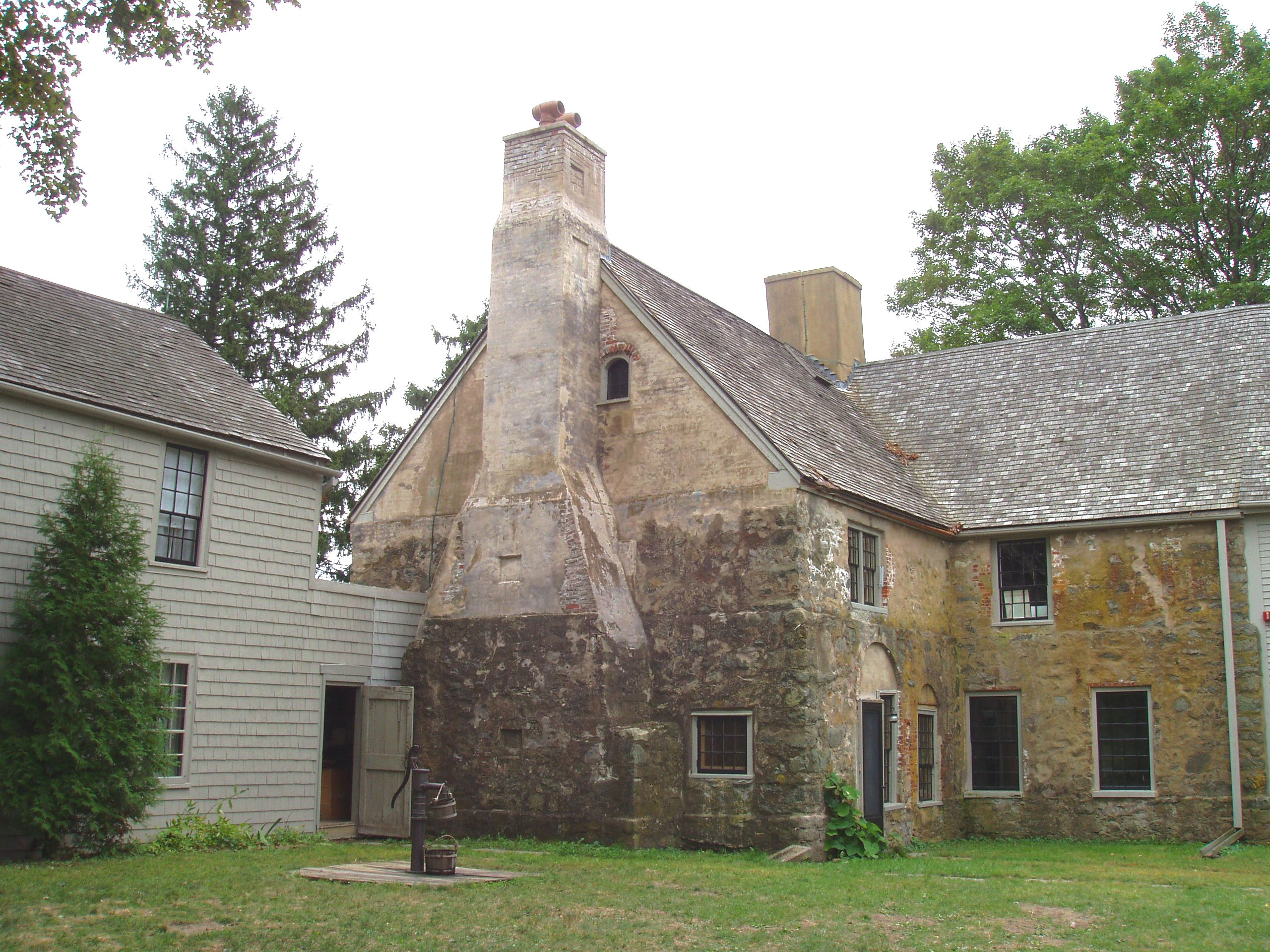
Spencer–Peirce–Little Farm, Newbury, Massachusetts. Rear oblique view, showing kitchen chimney.

The Spencer–Peirce–Little Farm is a Colonial American farm located at 5 Little's Lane, Newbury, Massachusetts, United States, in the midst of 231 acres (93 ha) of open land bordering the Merrimack River and Plum Island Sound. The farmhouse, dating to c. 1690, was designated a National Historic Landmark in 1968 as an extremely rare 17th-century stone house in New England. It is now a nonprofit museum owned and operated by Historic New England and open to the public several days a week during the warmer months; an admission fee is charged for non Members.

== Description and history ==
In 1635, John Spencer was the original grantee of the 400 acre parcel of land. The land was used to raise beef cattle for the community. Daniel Peirce Sr., a blacksmith from Ipswich in Essex County, England, purchased the property in 1651 for 500 pounds. By his death in 1677, the property had risen in value to 1,200 pounds and was described in the inventory of the estate as, "A Farme about two hundred and thirty acres of upland and meadow with housing, barns and orchard." This jump in value may indicate that the stone house was built during his lifetime. In 1861, Edward H. Little, local farmer, purchased the farm. His descendants made few changes to the house, and gave the property to the Society for the Preservation of New England Antiquities (now Historic New England) in 1986.

The farmhouse is built of local stone in random rubble, with a porch and gable ends of brick, and exterior walls in lime mortar. It is the only stone house of the 17th century in New England to survive with exterior walls intact. Floors and roof are timber framed, with major framing beams and joists set in pockets of the exterior walls. Molded bricks in a variety of shapes and fabrications embellish the entrance niche and arched openings. The original arched windows were replaced with smaller, Georgian windows by Nathaniel Tracy in the 18th century.

Today's floor plan with central chimney and rear ell is essentially original, but for the added partitions in east and north chambers. The original central chimney's foundation, supported by two broad brick arches, survives in the cellar; but above this point the central chimney was torn down in the late eighteenth century.

A tenant farmer building is to the rear, connected with the main house by a breezeway. Outbuildings include a carriage barn (now converted to museum space) and a large barn. Some 230 acres (93 ha) of farmland is still in productive use and contains walking paths for the public. The house itself has been arranged to be suitable for children's visits. Exhibits include a parlor restored to early nineteenth-century style and set for tea, kitchen restored to the 1930s, and dining room set exactly as when recorded in the 1940s. They explain the archaeological excavations and display furniture, 18th century glass and ceramic vessels reconstructed from shards found at the site.

== See also ==
- List of the oldest buildings in Massachusetts
- List of historic houses in Massachusetts
- Open-air museum
- List of National Historic Landmarks in Massachusetts
- National Register of Historic Places listings in Essex County, Massachusetts
