= Plum Island Airport =

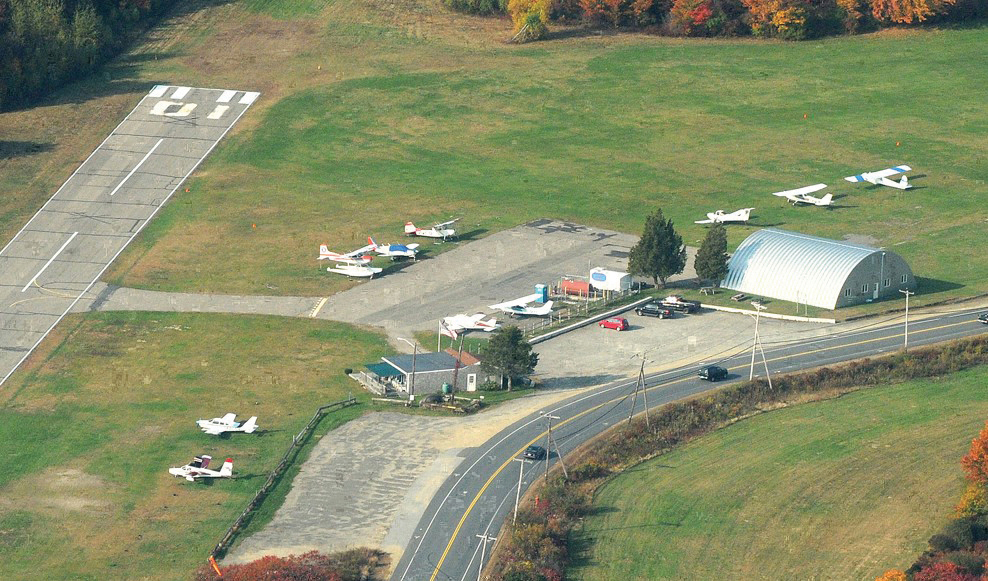
- IATA: none; ICAO: none; FAA LID: 2B2

Summary
- Airport type: Public
- Owner: Historic New England
- Operator: Plum Island Aerodrome, Inc.
- Location: Newbury, Massachusetts
- Elevation AMSL: 11 ft (3.4 m)
- Coordinates: 42°47′45.3300″N 70°50′28.19″W
- Website: www.plumislandairport.org

Map
- Interactive map of Plum Island Airport

Runways
Direction	Length		Surface
Direction	ft	m	Surface
10/28	2,105	642	Asphalt
14/32	2,300	701	Grass

Statistics (2007)
- Aircraft operations: 2,825
- Based aircraft: 8
- Source: Federal Aviation Administration

Plum Island Airport, (FAA LID: 2B2) in Newbury, Massachusetts, is a privately owned, public-use airport owned by Historic New England and operated by Plum Island Aerodrome, Inc., a non-profit corporation. It has two runways, averages 54 flights per week, and has approximately 8 based aircraft.

== History ==
=== 1910 Burgess Flying Field ===
The first flying field in New England was on the dunes and marshes of Plum Island, about a mile and a half east of the current airport, where from April to August 1910, Marblehead yacht designer W. Starling Burgess conducted a series of test flights with biplanes that he and Augustus M. Herring designed and built.

On February 28, 1910, the first airplane flight in New England took place when Herring took off from the frozen surface of Chebacco Lake in Hamilton, Massachusetts, in a pusher biplane he and Burgess built. (Herring had first tested gliders in 1895 with the 'Father of Aviation', Octave Chanute, on the Lake Michigan dunes.) After the single flight, Burgess sold the plane and moved the operation to the marshes at Plum Island. He built a building and a wooden "runway" near where the dunes meet the marshes, about a mile south of the current entrance to the Parker River National Wildlife Refuge. The test range included approximately the area bounded by the dunes, the Plum Island Turnpike, High Road, and the Parker River. The aeroplane, called the Flying Fish, first made three short flights on April 17. In May Burgess brought additional aeroplanes from Marblehead and built an additional building. Tests continued through the spring and summer of 1910 with longer and higher flights.

In August 1910 Burgess and his team discontinued the test flights in order to prepare for the Harvard-Boston Aero Meet to be held the following month in Squantum, on Dorchester Bay. As a result of Burgess's interaction with the world's leading aviators at the H-B Aero Meet, he sold seven biplanes to English aviator Claude Graham-White, believed to be the first U.S.-built aircraft sold abroad. Burgess also drew the interest of the Wright brothers, who contracted the Burgess Company to build Wright Flyers under license. Burgess built over a hundred airplanes of various designs through the end of World War I, when his factory in Marblehead burned up. He built the world's first flying wing, the Burgess-Dunne, which he sold to the Canadian armed forces. He also built the first aircraft to both take off from and land on water. In 1915, he was awarded the prestigious Collier Trophy, still recognized as the pre-eminent aviation award for the greatest progress in aviation in the preceding year.

=== Current Plum Island Airport ===
The earliest record of possible aviation activity at the current Plum Island Airport was in 1926, when the U.S. Army Air Service designated the field as an Emergency Landing Field. Sometime in 1926–1929, the new Civil Aviation Administration (now the FAA) installed a beacon tower at the Plum Island field as a primary navigation aid to mark the Boston-Portland air route. The base of the beacon tower can still be seen at the bend in the Plum Island Turnpike.

Commercial operation of the airfield began in August 1933 by Joseph Basso and W.F. Bartlett. In May 1937, John Polando began passenger service, airmail service, and pilot training flights at the airport. Polando was nationally famous as the holder of the long-distance flight record, together with Russell Boardman, for their 1931 non-stop New York to Istanbul flight. With his partner, Warren Frothingham, Polando expanded airport facilities as business increased. In July 1937, a green light was added to the beacon, thus permitting all types of aircraft to land there. Three hangars, an office building, the asphalt runway, and a small building beside the beacon tower were built before World War II. The small building (the current airport office) was used for many years as a restaurant known as the Cockpit Café, named by a local girl in a May 1938 contest in return for flying lessons.

By 1940, the Civilian Pilot Training Program began operating at Plum Island. The CPT used the airport extensively until early 1942, when all civilian airports within 25 miles of the coast were ordered closed and flight training moved further inland. During World War II, the Coast Guard used the hangars, and a group of small airplanes, probably a Civil Air Patrol unit, was based at Plum Island. This combination of military and civilian craft, under military control, was used for reconnaissance and offshore patrol to locate German U-boats and their victims along the New England coast. The airport was also used during the war to make movies such as "Wake Island" with naval aircraft based at N.A.S. Squantum. Polando left in 1942 to fly planes for radar tests at MIT, and then to serve in the Army Air Force. Frothingham's son Everett, who had learned to fly at Plum Island, became a Navy pilot and died in the war.

Frothingham continued to operate the airport for the next 24 years. In 1946, he added a second runway (the current grass strip) and built an additional hangar. Frothingham, who had the sole Northeast dealership for Aeronca airplanes in the 1940s and 1950s, provided a variety of aviation services, including maintenance and flight training. The Raytheon Company used the airport for radar testing during this period.

In 1966 Richard Hordon and two partners purchased the airport operation from Frothingham. Hordon bought out his partners within a few years and operated the airport for the next 34 years. He leased it first from the Little family, and later from the Society for the Preservation of New England Antiquities (SPNEA) to whom the Littles donated their historic farm. Hordon extended the asphalt runway and added "T" hangars at the east end of the airport. In 1977, a fire destroyed the earlier hangars and office building. Several months later, the Great Blizzard of 1978 caused extensive flooding that damaged the runway and the T hangars and destroyed a number of planes. These facilities were soon replaced, and the airport continued providing aircraft maintenance, pilot training and services for transient aircraft, and served as a base for crop-dusting, aerial photography, parcel delivery, and occasional medflights. In the 1970s airline pilot Geert Frank used the airport to restore a large number of World War II era airplanes, and the appearance of these unique planes provided an additional attraction for plane watchers along the Plum Island Turnpike. In the 1980s, the airport became the local center for ultralight aircraft.

In 2000 the airport was briefly closed after SPNEA declined to renew Hordon's lease citing concern for the safety of a historic structure on the property. Hordon prevented use of the airport runway by future lease holders by erecting a 27-foot tall barrier on the portion of the runway on his property adjacent to the airport, eventually failing in attempts to prove ownership of the property.

From 2001 to 2006 a non-profit organization, Plum Island Community Airfield, Inc., (PICA) – begun by Marc David Sarkady and others as a grassroots community-based group – leased for the airport from SPNEA and contracted with two successive operators to operate the airport. Victor Capozzi of Beverly managed the airfield until September 2002, followed by Eagle East Aviation of Lawrence, which managed it until 2005. PICA managed the airfield itself for the final year of its five-year lease. In June 2002, a volunteer group led by PICA president Ted Russell opened the Burgess Aviation Museum to promote the history of aviation at Plum Island and the region. PICA's last president was former National Parachute Champion David "Butch" Crook of Rowley.

From 2006 to 2012, Plum Island Aerodrome housed Noyes Enterprises, which restored and sold Cessna L-19 Bird Dog aircraft. During this time, the hangar and facilities were used to repower and modify a large number of Cessna L-19 aircraft for the Royal Canadian Air Cadets.

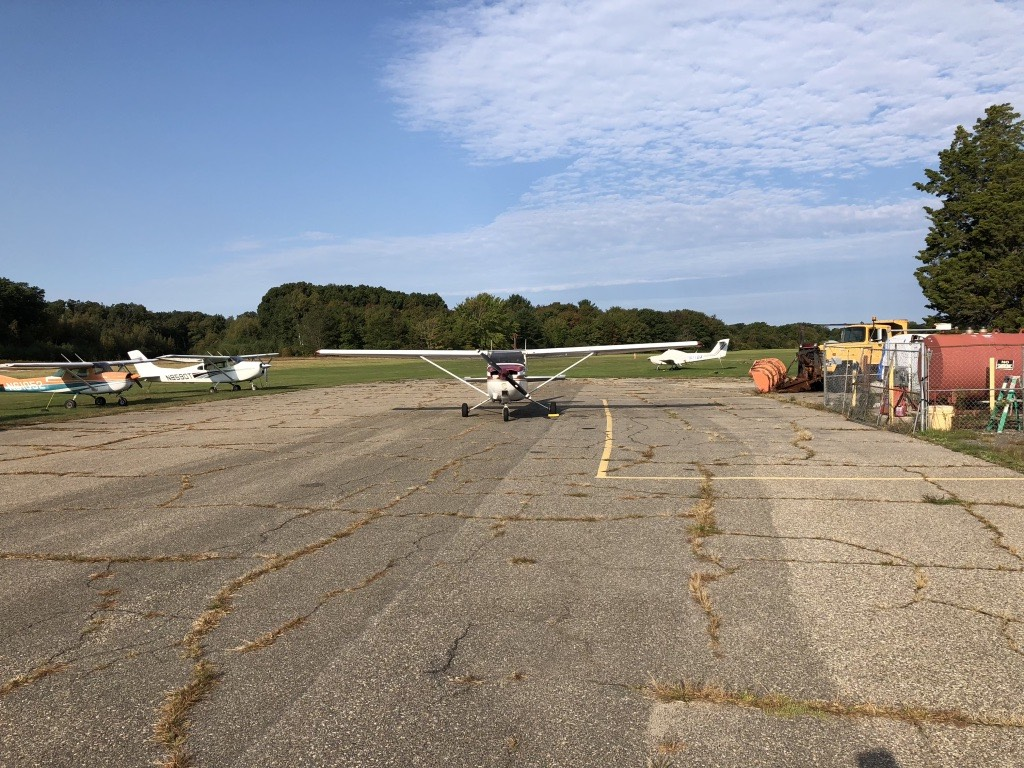
Ramp with planes at Plum Island Airport (2B2)

== Current status ==
Ever since October 2006, the airport has been leased from Historic New England, and has operated under the name Plum Island Aerodrome. Since then, a hangar has been constructed and the museum has been improved. In July 2010, the 10/28 asphalt runway was resurfaced. The runway was resurfaced again in 2022.

== See also ==
- List of airports in Massachusetts
