= Marrett House =

Historic house in Maine, United States

- Daniel Marrett House
- U.S. National Register of Historic Places
- U.S. Historic district – Contributing property
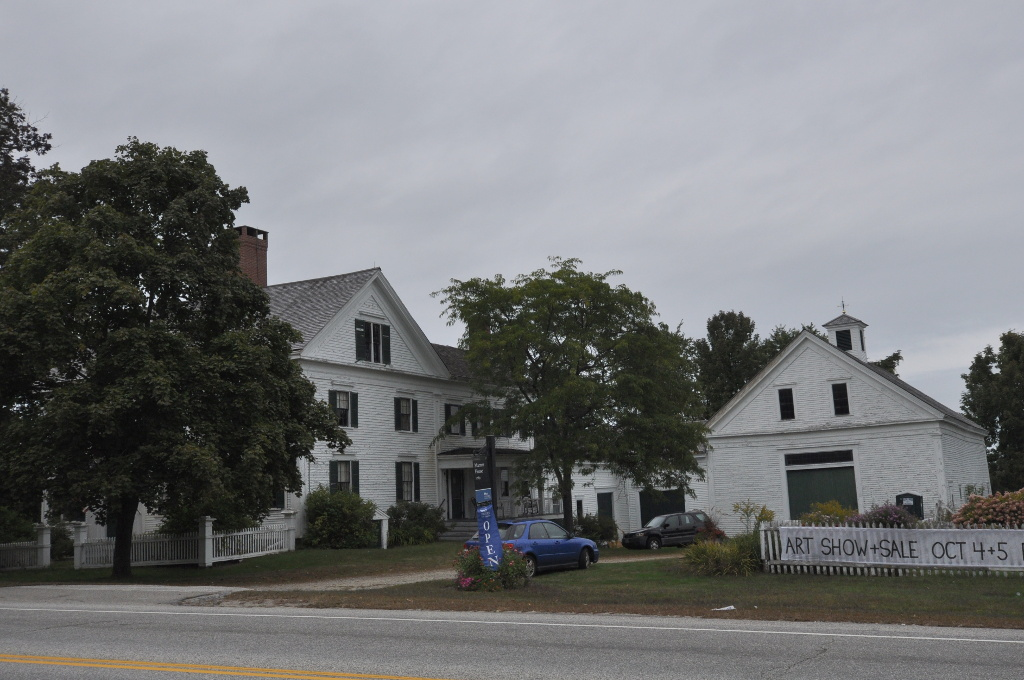

- Location within Maine Location within the United States
- Location: 40 Ossipee Trail East (ME 25), Standish, Maine
- Coordinates: 43°43′55″N 70°33′5″W
- Area: 1 acre (0.40 ha)
- Built: 1789
- Architectural style: Greek Revival
- Part of: Standish Corner Historic District (ID93001117)
- NRHP reference No.: 74000314

Significant dates
- Added to NRHP: February 15, 1974
- Designated CP: October 14, 1993

The Daniel Marrett House is a historic house museum at 40 East Ossipee Trail (Maine State Route 25) in Standish, Maine. Built in 1789, it is a prominent local example of Greek Revival architecture, and was for many years owned by members of the Marrett family. In 1944 it was given to the Society for the Preservation of New England Antiquities (now Historic New England), which operates it as a museum today. The house was listed on the National Register of Historic Places in 1974.

== Description and history ==
The Marrett House is located in the village of Standish Corner, on the north side of the Ossipee Trail, just east of the junction with Maine State Route 35. It is a wood frame connected farmstead, with the main house in front, connected via a series of additions to a barn. The main block is 2 1/2 stories in height, with a side gable roof, central chimney, clapboard siding, and stone foundation. The front facade is five bays wide, with an entrance vestibule featuring flanking pilasters and a gabled pediment. The building corners are pilastered, and Greek Revival trim is continued on the ells and the barn. The interior of the house retains most of its original finishes, and is decorated with Marrett family possessions, given with the house.

The house was built in 1789 by Benjamin Titcomb, and had at that time typical Federal period styling. It was acquired in 1796 by Daniel Marrett, a Harvard College graduate who moved to Standish to become the town parson. The house he purchased reflected his status as the community's leading citizen. Over the years, Marrett's children and grandchildren enlarged and updated the house but left many furnishings and interior arrangements unchanged as relics of the past. They preserved the southwest parlor exactly as it had appeared on the occasion of a family wedding in 1847. In 1889, the family celebrated the house's centennial by refurbishing several of the rooms with reproduction heirloom wallpapers and bed hangings, and organizing a large family reunion to honor the Marrett legacy.

The house was used to safeguard gold from banks in Portland during the War of 1812.

In 1944, the house was given by Daniel Marrett's descendants to Historic New England. The house is open to the public for guided tours on the first and third Saturday of the month, June though October 15.

== See also ==
- National Register of Historic Places listings in Cumberland County, Maine
