= Abraham Adams House =

Historic house in Massachusetts, United States

- U.S. National Register of Historic Places
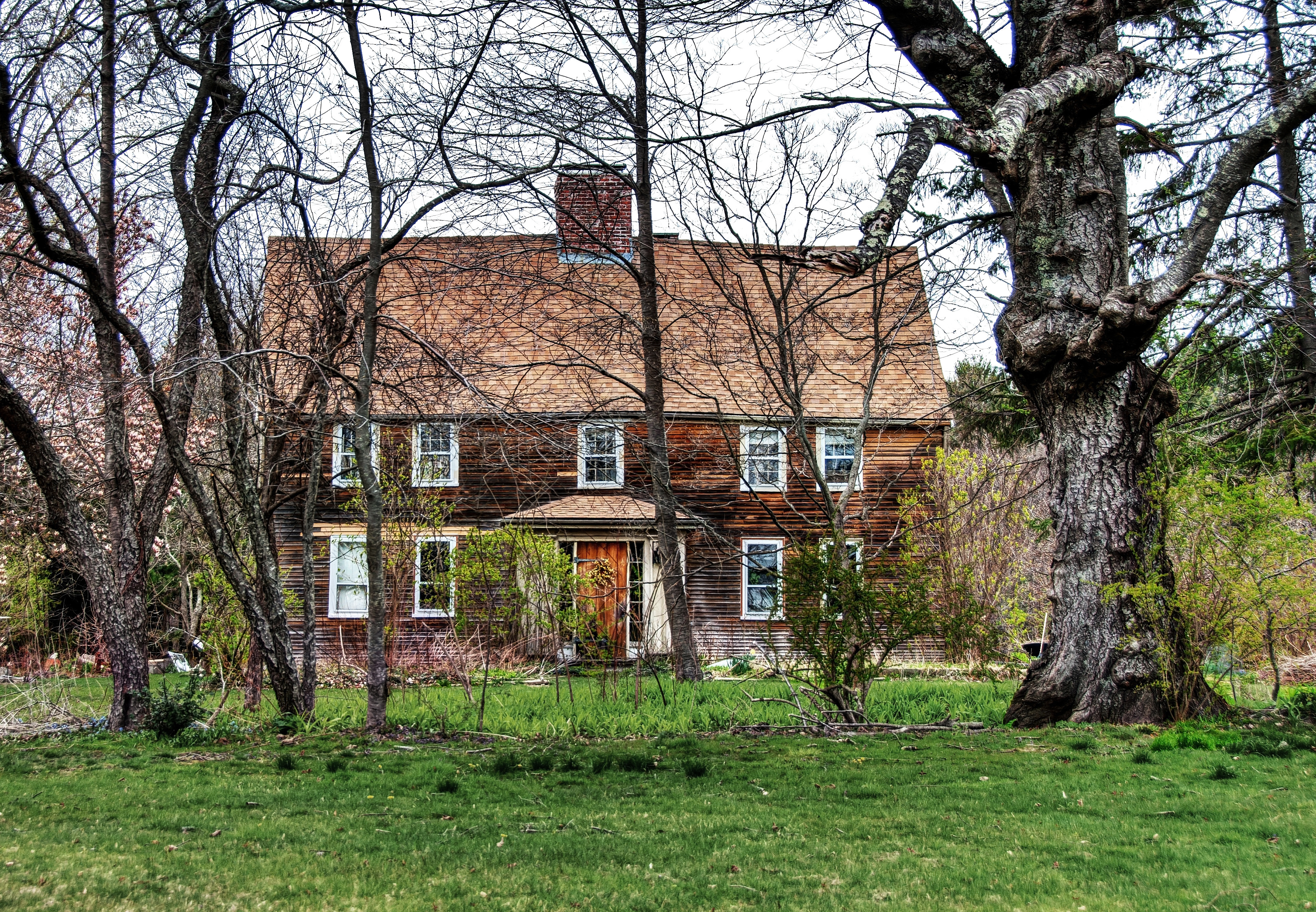

- Location within Massachusetts Location within the United States
- Location: 8 Pearson Dr., Newbury, Massachusetts
- Coordinates: 42°45′17″N 70°55′43″W
- Area: 5.12 acres (2.07 ha)
- Built: 1704
- Architectural style: Colonial
- MPS: First Period Buildings of Eastern Massachusetts TR
- NRHP reference No.: 90000245
- Added to NRHP: March 9, 1990

The Abraham Adams House is a historic First Period house in Newbury, Massachusetts. Its oldest portion dates to between 1705 and 1707, and its interior retains a number of First and Second Period colonial features. It was listed on the National Register of Historic Places in 1990.

== Description and history ==
The Abraham Adams House stands in a residential subdivision in the Byfield area of Newbury. It is set on the north side of Pearson Drive, on a 5-acre (2.0 ha) parcel. It is a 2 1/2 story wood-frame house, whose main block, its oldest portion, has a gabled roof, central chimney, and clapboarded exterior. Later additions include a two-story ell projecting from the rear of the house, to which is connected a single story modern addition, giving the whole house an "I" shape.

The main part of the house was probably built between 1705 and 1707, based on an analysis of the construction methods used. It was built by Abraham Adams, a farmer and sea captain who was married to the granddaughter of jurist Samuel Sewall. Three of the four chambers in the oldest portion have exposed oak timbers with chamfered corners, while the fourth chamber and the first ell have Second Period fireplace surrounds. The house was surrounded by hayfields until the construction of the surrounding subdivision in the 1980s; as a consequence, it was known for many years as "High Fields".

== See also ==
- National Register of Historic Places listings in Essex County, Massachusetts
