= Jane Nylander =

American historian (born 1938)

Jane C. Nylander
- Born: 1938
- Other names: Jane Cayford

Jane Cayford Nylander is an American historian and author. She is known for her work on textiles and used buildings to describe life in past eras.

== Education and career ==
Nylander was born in 1938 and grew up in Ohio. She has an undergraduate degree in political science from Brown University and a master's degree in early American history from the University of Delaware. She then moved to Winterthur Museum where she was the first woman student, and she led a program that used houses to describe past eras. She was the director of the Strawbery Banke Museum from 1986 until 1992, and while there she led an exhibition pairing a house viewed as if in 1950 with a 1795 household. At the Old Sturbridge Village Nylander was the curator of textiles and ceramics. She served as president of the Society for the Preservation of New England Antiquities, which is now known as Historic New England.

After she retired, she wrote the book The Best Ever! Parades in New England which is a historical investigation of parades in small towns in the United States.

== Selected publications ==
- Fabrics for Historic Buildings (4th ed.). National Trust. 1990.
- Our Own Snug Fireside: Images of the New England Home, 1760–1860. Knopf. 1993.
- Windows on the Past: Four Centuries of New England Homes. Historic New England. 2009.
- The Best Ever! Parades in New England, 1788–1940. Bauhan Publishing. 2022.
