= Vin Cipolla =

American entrepreneur (born 1956)

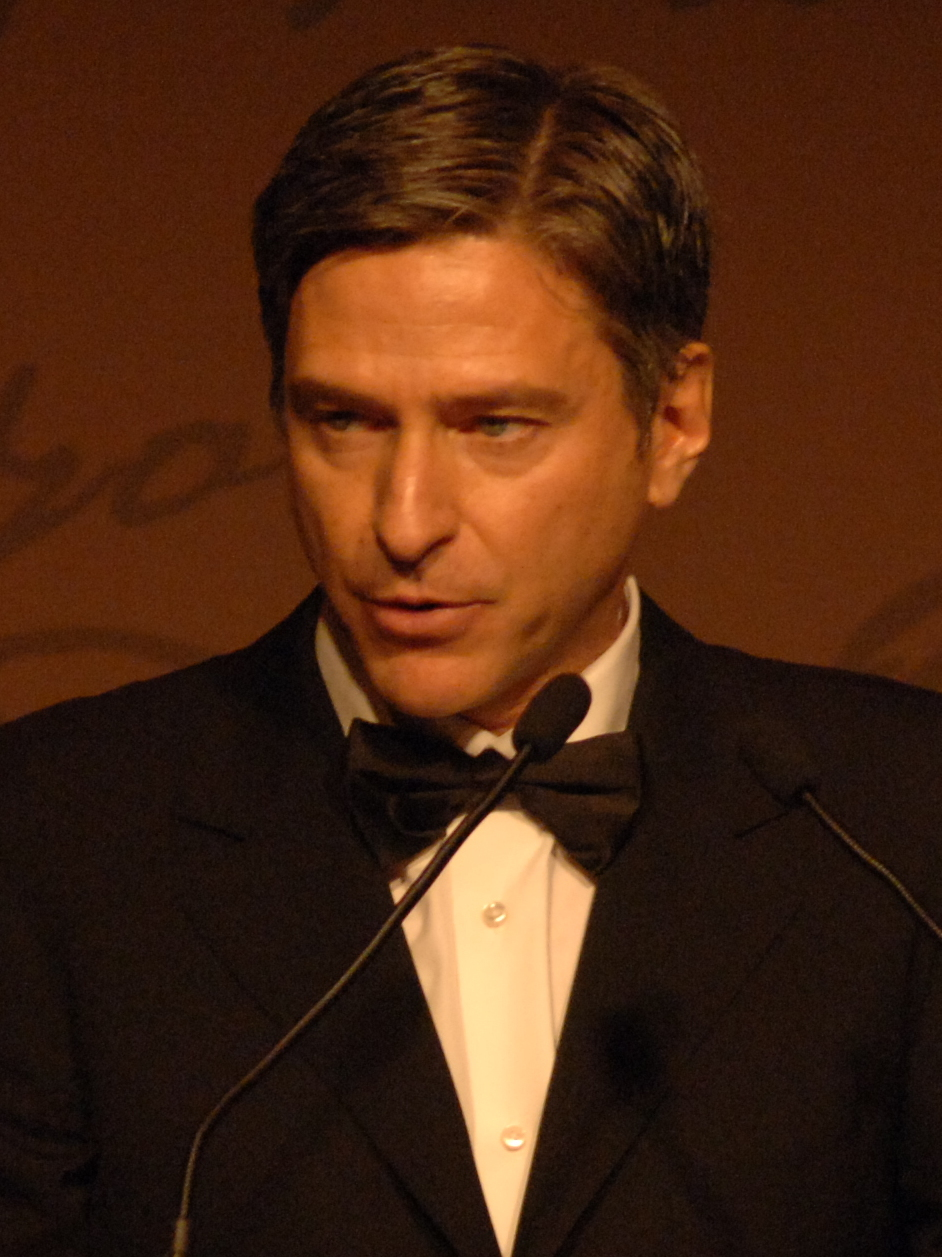
- Cipolla in 2006
- Born: 1956 (age 69–70)
- Education: Clark University (BA)
- Occupations: Entrepreneur; civil leader
- Spouse: Celine McDonald
- Children: 4

Vin Cipolla (born 1956) is an American entrepreneur and civic leader noted for his contributions in both the private and public sectors. He is the founder of three media and information technology marketing firms and has been chief executive officer for six U.S. corporations in the financial services, telecommunications, consumer goods and media industries. Additionally he was on nine corporate boards throughout his career. He is a supporter of the arts and an active proponent for environmental preservation and sustainability as evidenced by his positions on the board of directors for more than twenty-five non-profit organizations including the National Park Foundation and the Municipal Art Society of New York, where he also was president. He is president and CEO of Historic New England.

== Early life and education ==
A native of Massachusetts, Cipolla attended Clark University in Worcester, Massachusetts, where he was awarded Bachelor of Arts degrees magna cum laude in both English and government studies, was a member of Phi Beta Kappa, and received an honorary induction into Beta Gamma Sigma, the MBA Honors Society.

== Career ==
=== Entrepreneurial ===
Cipolla launched a number of successful entrepreneurial endeavors in his early career. The Cipolla Group, a direct marketing firm based out of New York City, was founded in 1983 and merged with Boston firm Ingalls, Quinn & Johnson in 1991. In 1993, Cipolla left IQ&J to form Pamet River Partners, a digital marketing company. After growing through expansion into London and Paris offices, Cipolla sold Pamet River Partners in 1999 to TeleTech Holdings, where he briefly remained as CEO of Pamet and Digital Creators.

Cipolla left TeleTech later in 1999 to form HNW, Inc., developing wealth management software.

=== Corporate ===
In 2003, Cipolla became CEO of Veritude, a global employment agency that is a division of Fidelity Investments. During this tenure, he sat on the board of Veritude and also of Fidelity Charitable Services, Fidelity's philanthropic arm.

== Civic involvement ==
Cipolla is active in several civic organizations focused on conservation and the arts.

=== National Trust for Historic Preservation ===
Starting in 1993, Cipolla was executive vice president of the National Trust for Historic Preservation, where he published the Trust's national publication Preservation.

=== National Park Foundation ===
In 2005, Cipolla was named CEO of the National Park Foundation, the private philanthropy that raises funds to support the US National Park system.

=== Institute of Contemporary Art ===
He was on the board of trustees for the Institute of Contemporary Art in Boston for 15 years, including 9 years as chairman and president, before becoming chairman emeritus. Among his accomplishments was the development and completion of a new museum building.

=== Municipal Art Society ===
Cipolla joined the board of the Municipal Art Society of New York (MAS) in 2008, accepting the role as president in early 2009. Under his leadership, the MAS has produced a number of public projects that include the 9/11 Tribute in Light Memorial. He founded the MAS Summit for New York City, the city's largest annual urban policy conference and conducts the MAS Survey on Livability with the support of the Rockefeller Foundation. He is an active proponent of the rebuilding of a new Penn Station in New York City and relocating Madison Square Garden, calling the rebuilt train station "the key infrastructure and development project of our time and an essential investment in the future of our city."

=== Historic New England ===
In June 2020, he began his tenure at Historic New England as president and CEO.

=== Others ===
Additionally, Cipolla sits on the boards of National Parks of New York Harbor Conservancy, Ballet Hispanico, the Augustus Saint-Gaudens Memorial, The Christie's Charity, and Sailors for the Sea.

== Awards and honors ==
- Member, Phi Beta Kappa at Clark University
- Inductee, Beta Gamma Sigma at Clark University Graduate School of Business Management (2000)
- Honored at the 2010 Ballet Hispanico Gala for his philanthropic contributions

== Personal ==
Cipolla is married to landscape artist Celine McDonald and has four daughters.
