= Merwin House (Stockbridge, Massachusetts) =

Coordinates: 42°16′56.65″N 73°18′48.68″W

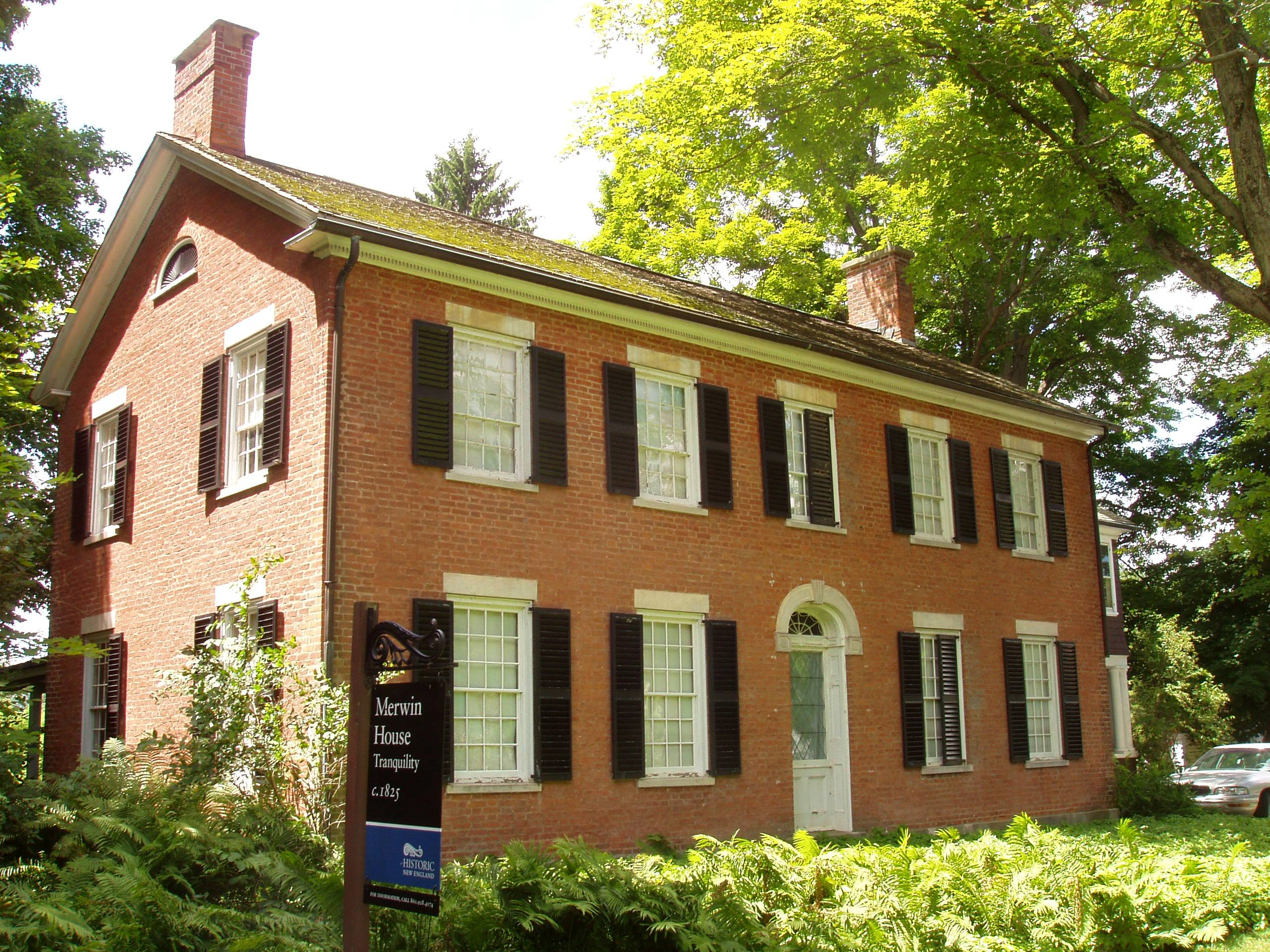
Merwin House

Merwin House, also known as Tranquility, is a house located at 14 Main Street, Stockbridge, Massachusetts, USA. It is now a non-profit museum operated by Historic New England and sometimes open to the public. An admission fee is charged.

The original brick, Federal-style house was constructed c. 1825 by the Dresser family, who sold it to William and Elizabeth Doane of New York City as a summer home in 1875. They doubled its size by adding a shingle-style ell, and also remodeled its interior. It was donated to the public by the Doanes' daughter, Vipont Merwin, who was born in the house in 1878 and died there in 1965. The property was acquired by Historic New England in 1966, whereupon it became a museum.

The house currently reflects furnishings and a lifestyle of the late 19th century, with period antiques and items collected during world travel.

== See also ==
- Historic New England
- List of historic houses in Massachusetts
