= Dole–Little House =

Coordinates: 42°45′48.97″N 70°50′50.78″W

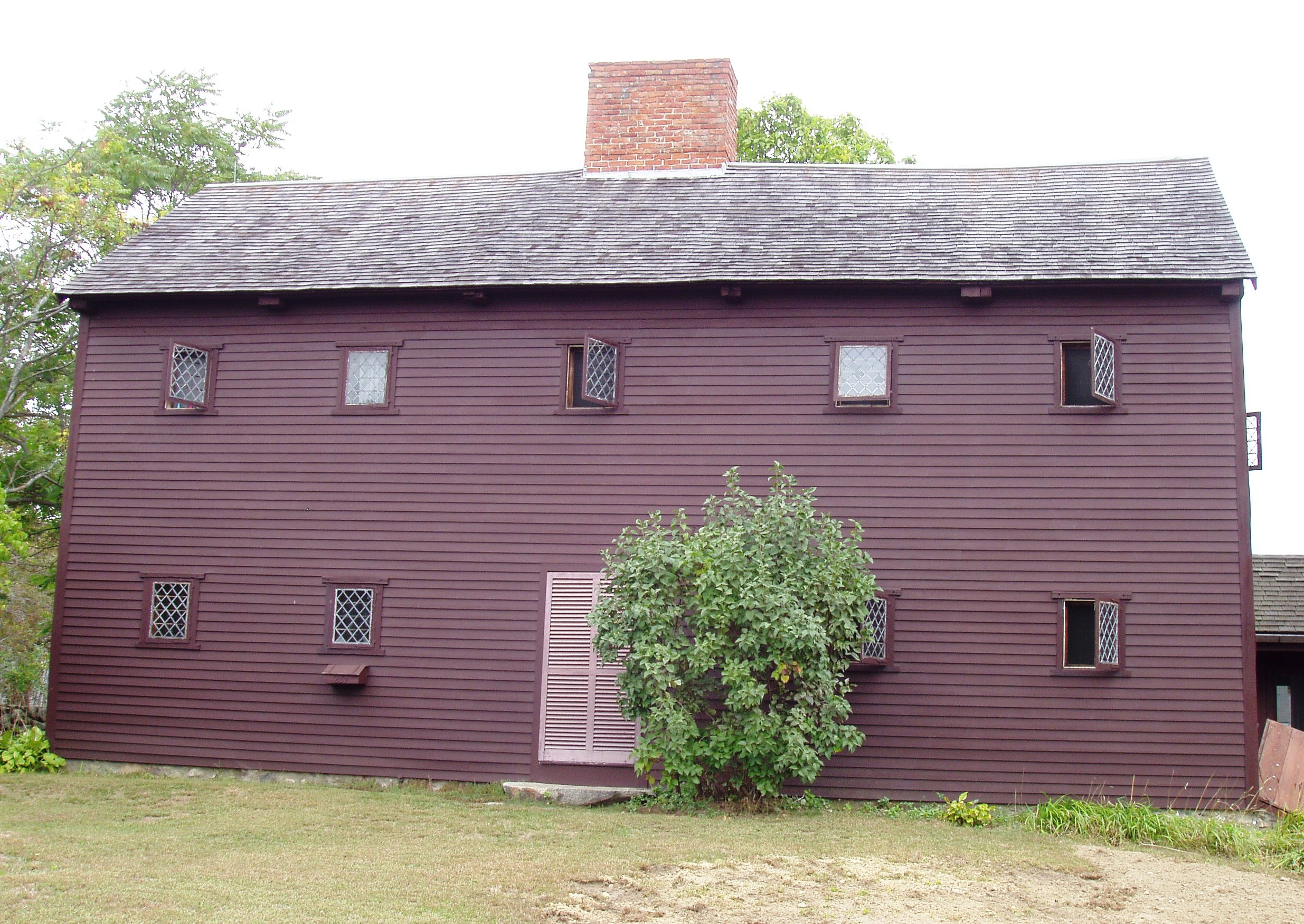
Front view

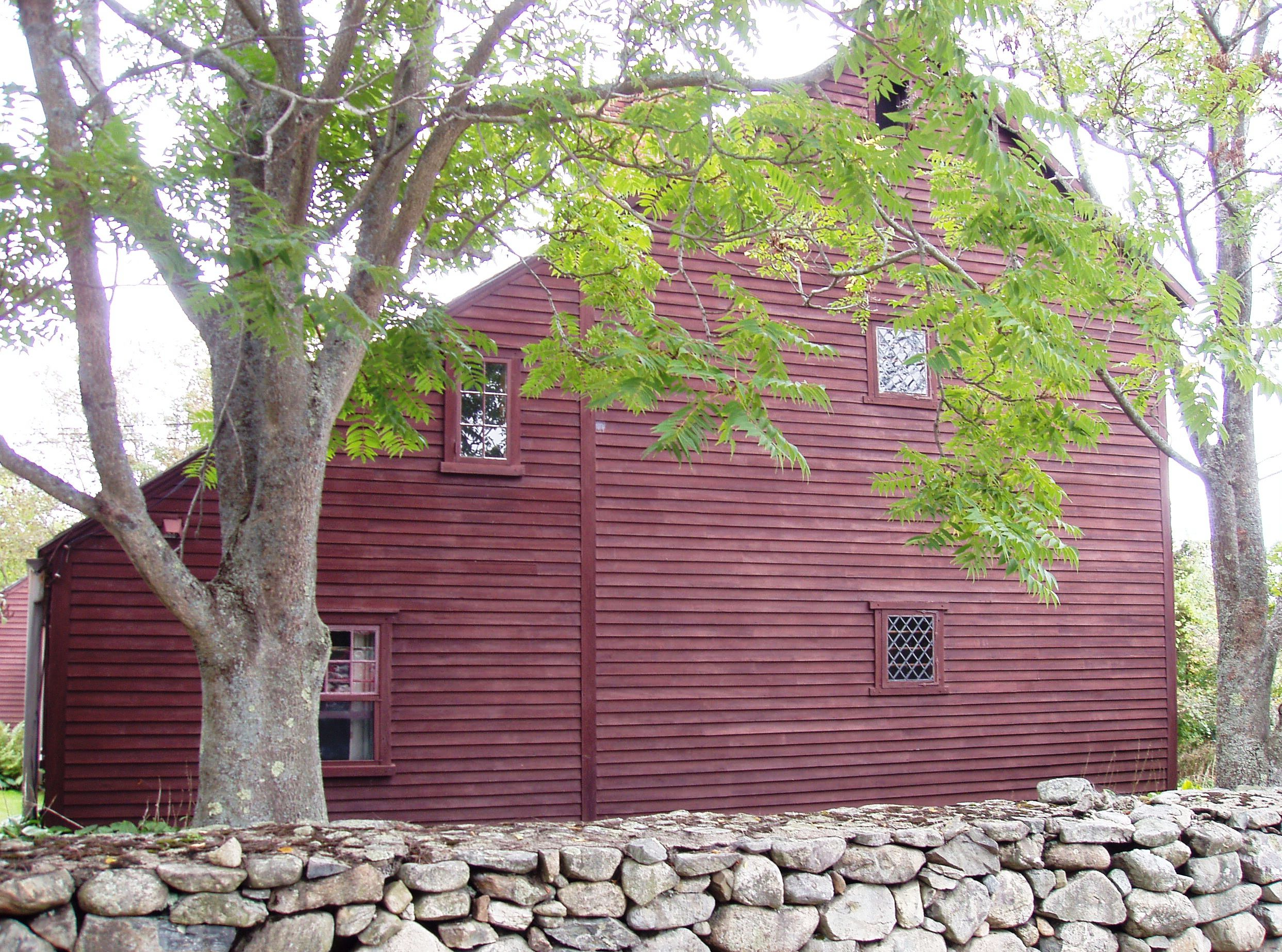
Side view from High Road

The Dole–Little House is a historic house at 289 High Road, Newbury, Massachusetts. It is now a non-profit museum operated by Historic New England and open to the public, for a fee, at rare intervals. Private tours can also be arranged.

The original house was built around 1715 with materials salvaged from an earlier structure (perhaps c. 1670) for Richard Dole, a cattleman. It was built a two-room, central-chimney construction with a small kitchen shed at the rear. This shed has since been replaced with a larger lean-to.

In 1954 the house was acquired by Florence Evans Bushee and restored to reflect its original period. During restoration, the lean-to was removed and reconstructed with new timbers, and a small-paned sash from the front of the house was moved to the lean-to. The paneling from one chamber was installed as an exhibition room at the National Museum of American History in Washington, D.C.; a copy replaces it in the original chamber. Historic New England received the title to the house after Mrs. Bushee's death in 1975.
