= Rundlet-May House =

Historic house in New Hampshire, United States

- U.S. National Register of Historic Places
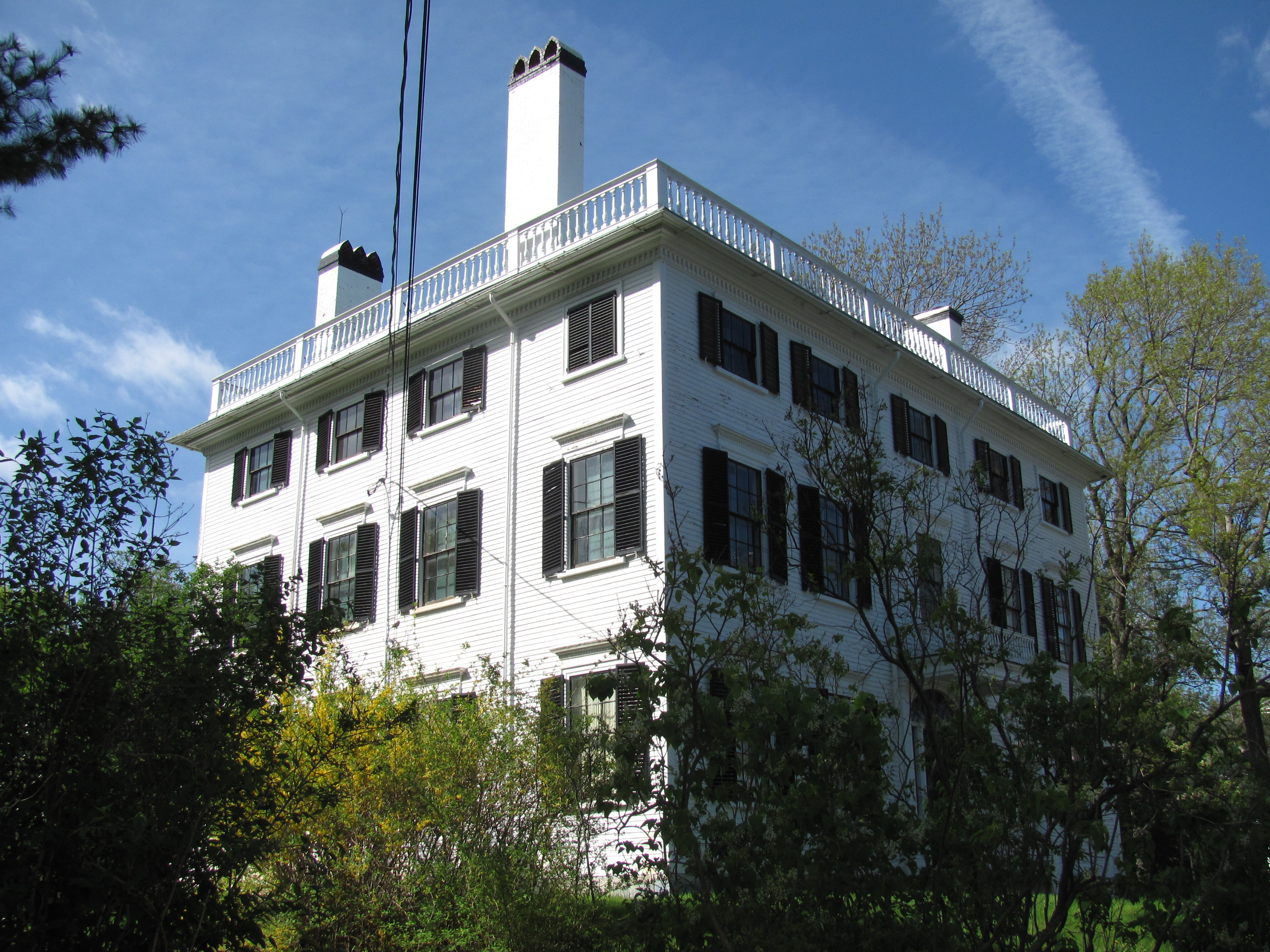
- Rundlet-May House

- Location within New Hampshire Location within the United States
- Location: 364 Middle St; Portsmouth, New Hampshire
- Coordinates: 43°04′17″N 70°45′45″W
- Area: 2 acres (0.81 ha)
- Built: 1807
- Architectural style: Federal
- NRHP reference No.: 76000133
- Added to NRHP: June 7, 1976

The Rundlet-May House is a historic house museum at 364 Middle Street in Portsmouth, New Hampshire, United States. Built in 1807, it is a well-preserved example of a high-end Federal style mansion, built for a wealthy merchant. The house is of particular significance due to the survival of early documentation related to its construction. It is now owned by Historic New England and open seasonally for tours. It was listed on the National Register of Historic Places in 1976.

== Description and history ==
The Rundlet-May House stands in what is now a predominantly residential area south of downtown Portsmouth, on the west side of Middle Street, a busy north–south road. It is a three-story wood-frame structure, topped by a low-pitch hip roof surrounded by a wooden balustrade. It is finished in wooden clapboards, and has four chimneys, symmetrically placed with two on each side. Its main facade is five bays wide, with a center entrance framed by sidelights and a fanlight.

The house was built in 1807 by James Rundlet, who acquired his wealth in the textile trade. Rundlet imported his wallpapers from England and purchased his furniture from local cabinetmakers, whose work was noted for its fine craftsmanship and striking use of veneer. Rundlet also saw to it that his house was equipped with the latest technologies. The kitchen boasts both a Rumford roaster and a Rumford range, as well as a set kettle and an elaborate venting system that services a smoke room on the third floor. There is an early coal-fired central heating system and an indoor well. Details of the house's construction are well-documented, because Rundlet and his heirs retained detailed records of work done on it.

Ralph May, a descendant of Rundlet, gave the property to the Society for the Preservation of New England Antiquities, now Historic New England. The house contains many of its original furnishings, as well as some pieces added by later generations. The formal gardens, orchard, and attached outbuildings (including two privies) remain as first used by Rundlet, and there is also a small pet cemetery on the grounds. It is open to the public on weekends between June and October.

== See also ==
- National Register of Historic Places listings in Rockingham County, New Hampshire
