= Rocky Hill Meeting House =

Historic church in Massachusetts, United States

- Rocky Hill Meetinghouse and Parsonage
- U.S. National Register of Historic Places
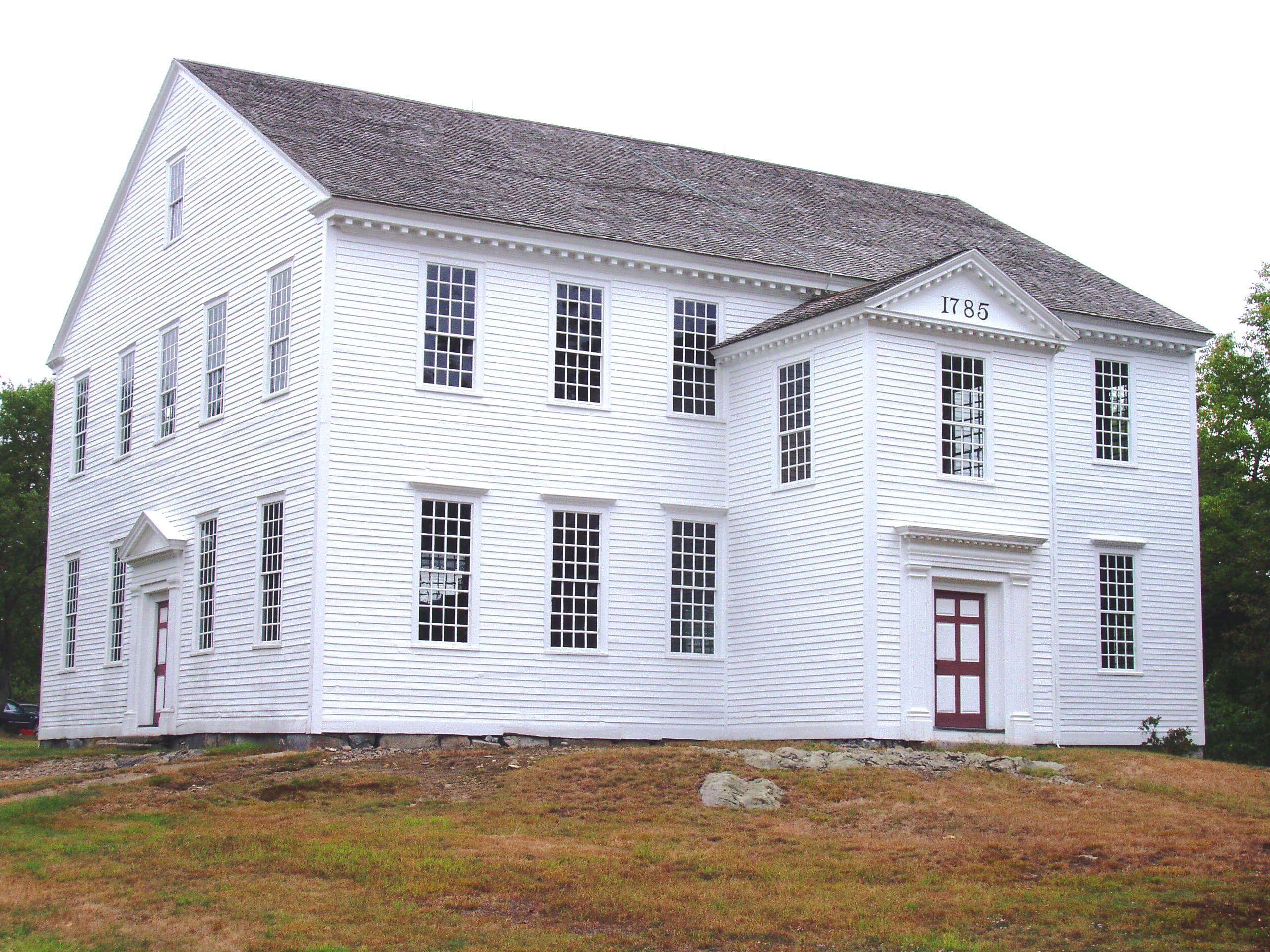
- Rocky Hill Meeting House, Amesbury, Massachusetts.
- Location: Old Portsmouth Rd. Amesbury, Massachusetts
- Coordinates: 42°51′2″N 70°54′39″W
- Built: c. 1785
- Architectural style: Georgian
- NRHP reference No.: 72000115
- Added to NRHP: April 11, 1972

The Rocky Hill Meeting House is a well-preserved New England meeting house located on Old Portsmouth Road in Amesbury, Massachusetts. Built about 1785, and not used as a church after 1840, it has the best-preserved example of an original 18th-century meeting house interior in New England. It was listed on the National Register of Historic Places in 1972. It is now a museum property owned and operated by Historic New England. It is open selected days each year; admission is charged.

== Description and history ==
The Rocky Hill Meeting House is located east of downtown Amesbury, on Old Portsmouth Road, now a short spur between Elm Street and Interstate 495. It is a roughly square 2-1/2 story timber frame structure, with a gabled roof and clapboarded exterior. Each side is five bays wide, with entrances on three sides. The principal entrance is on the south side, in a projecting two-story stairhouse. The interior consists of a single large chamber with a second-floor gallery on three sides. It lacks the modern amenities of electricity, plumbing, and heat.

The meeting house was built to serve the west parish of Salisbury in approximately 1785, replacing a c. 1715 meeting house. George Washington greeted local townspeople in this meeting house on his northward journey in 1789. By the 1840s, regular religious services had come to an end. Historic New England acquired the meeting house in 1941.

Its interior has remained virtually unchanged since it was constructed, with the original high pulpit, pentagonal sounding board, deacon's desk, marbleized columns, box pews (complete with graffiti and foot warmers), unfinished stairs to the gallery, and sloping gallery on three sides. The pews have never been painted, the marbleized pulpit and pillars supporting the galleries still feature their original paint, and the building still contains its original hardware.

== See also ==
- List of the oldest buildings in Massachusetts
- National Register of Historic Places listings in Essex County, Massachusetts
