= Swett–Ilsley House =

Coordinates: 42.80014°N 70.86255°W

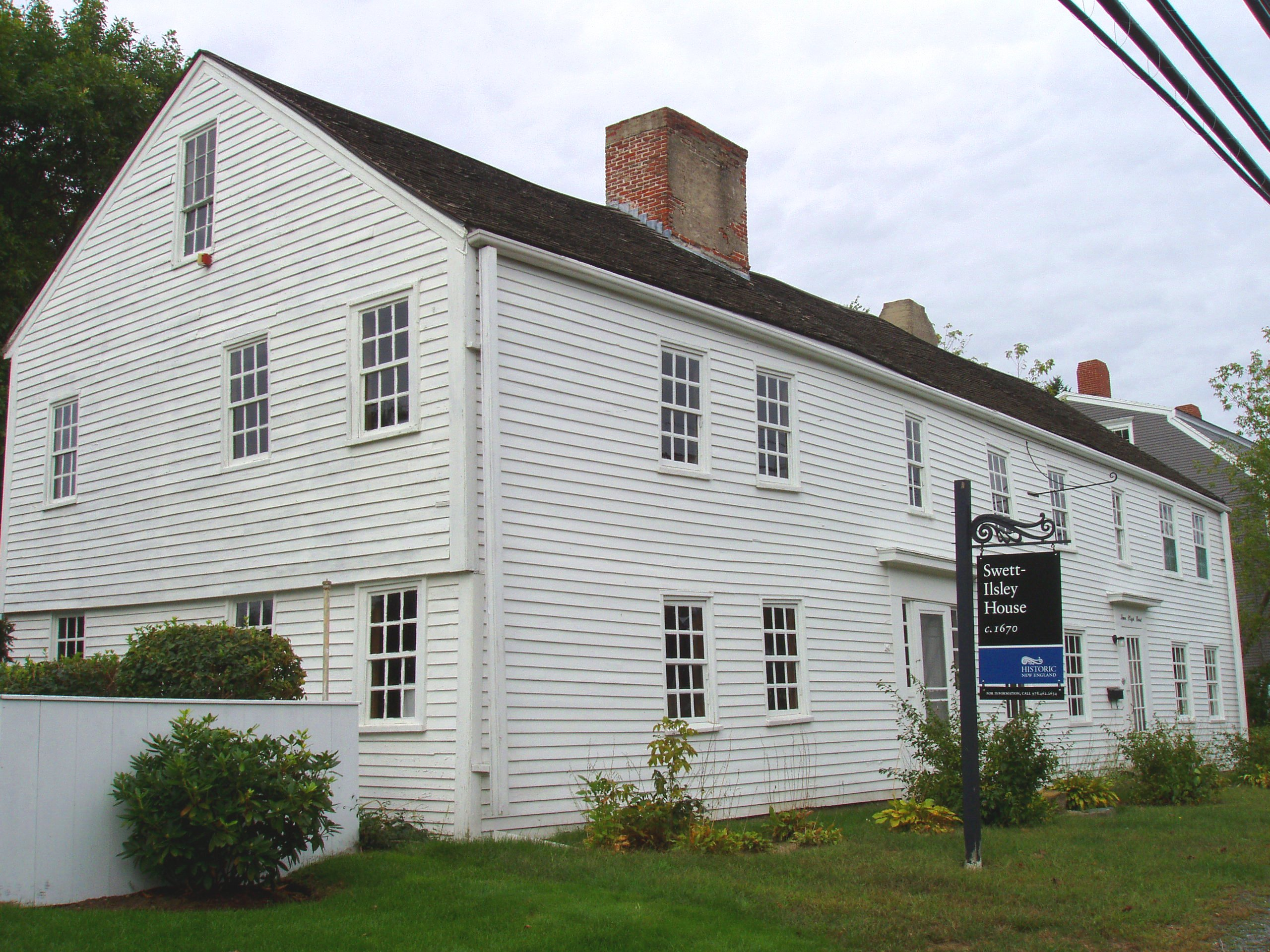
Swett–Ilsley House, Newbury, Massachusetts, front view

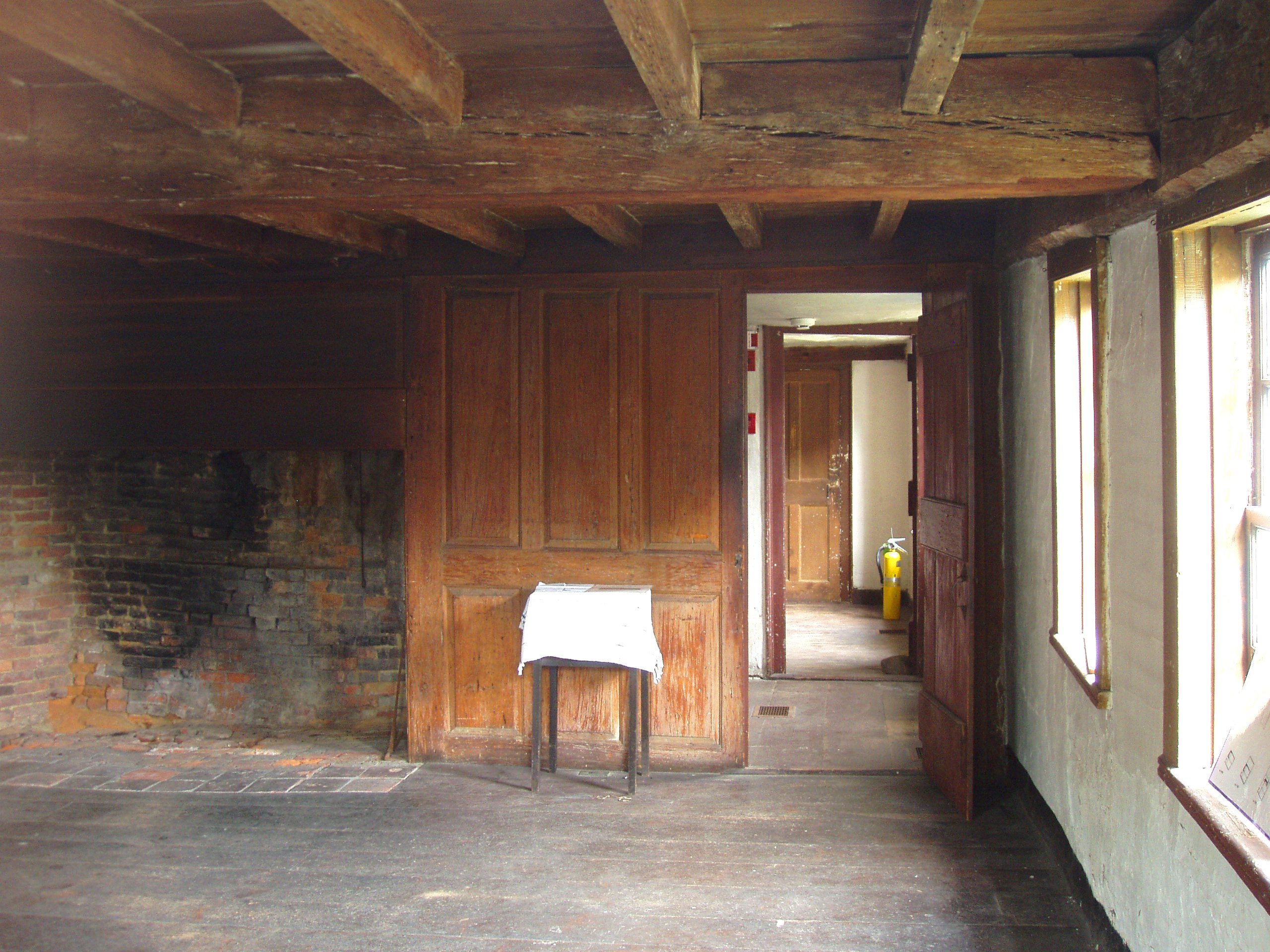
Interior view

The Swett–Ilsley House is a much extended Colonial house located at 4 High Road, Newbury, Massachusetts, United States. It is now owned by Historic New England, formerly the Society for the Preservation of New England Antiquities (SPNEA), and operated as a study museum.

The house's original section was built in 1670 by Stephen Swett, one of Newbury's first settlers, on a south-facing single-room plan with chimney bay. Under various owners, the house remained more or less unaltered until about 1720, when it was enlarged by addition of a second single-room household (with its own door) north of the original block. A new roof—made in part with salvaged rafters of the older roof—was built over the whole, changing the ridge pole direction from an east–west to a north–south axis. The chimney, then located at the northwestern corner of the main block, was retained, but its upper stack was probably modified at that time.

The house underwent a series of additions during the 18th and 19th centuries when it also served as a "tobacconist business," a chocolate mill, and a tavern. It was further extended to the north, although its irregular lot required that the eastern wall stopped two feet before the western wall. The original chimney was demolished, and a new central chimney was added to serve the 1670 and 1720 portions of the house.

In 1756, the house's irregular shape was somewhat squared when the purchase of land to the north yielded an opportunity to build a final northern addition of single-room plan with stair-hall and separate chimney. The building achieved its present form with the construction of a kitchen lean-to at the western end of the house, containing one of the largest fireplaces of the period, with three beehive ovens.

In 1911, the house was purchased by SPNEA, its first architectural acquisition. With advice from restoration architect Henry Charles Dean, SPNEA removed layers of lath and plaster to reveal original timbers, early 18th-century paneling, and one of the largest fireplaces in New England. Restoration stopped when funds were exhausted, before any long-gone original features like diamond-paned casements were recreated, resulting in a house with an unrestored 18th-century exterior and a partially restored interior reflecting both the 17th and early 18th centuries. After restoration, the house was rented to a series of tenants, who operated a tea room there until 1965 when the house became a study museum.
