= Abbott Lowell Cummings =

American historian

- Born: March 14, 1923; St. Albans, Vermont, US
- Died: May 29, 2017 (aged 94); Hadley, Massachusetts, US
- Education: Ohio State University (PhD); Oberlin College (BA); Hoosac School
- Employers: Boston University; Yale University; Historic New England

Abbott Lowell Cummings (March 14, 1923 – May 29, 2017) was a noted architectural historian and genealogist, best known for his study of New England architecture.

== Life and career ==
Cummings was born in St. Albans, Vermont, educated at the Hoosac School in New York, studied American art and architectural history at Oberlin College, and received his doctoral degree from Ohio State University in 1950. When young, he spent winters with his parents in Bennington, Vermont, and summers with his grandmother in Southington, Connecticut. In an interview with Laura Beech, Cummings reflected on his grandmother's influence: "At a personal level, my grandmother had as much influence as anyone on my life. She was a scientist by training, a Vassar graduate who had studied astronomy. She drilled into me the need to be very factual. I also fell right in with all her genealogical interests."

In his teens, Cummings joined the Society for the Preservation of New England Antiquities (SPNEA, now known as Historic New England), and spent hours at the town clerk's office in Southington, tracing the titles of his ancestors' colonial structures. Elmer D. Keith, a Wallingford, Connecticut, antiquarian, author and collector, taught Cummings to deconstruct a building to look behind its repairs and later additions. In graduate school, Cumming's thesis was on seventeenth-century Massachusetts buildings, and his dissertation was on the Federal architect Asher Benjamin.

Cumming's career mixed academic and museum positions. After receiving his degree in 1948, he taught at Antioch College. In 1951, as colleges began cutting staff due to the Korean War, Cummings lost his academic post and reluctantly became an assistant curator in the American Wing at New York's Metropolitan Museum of Art. In 1955, Bertram K. Little, then SPNEA director, asked Cummings to join SPNEA as assistant director and editor of Old-Time New England. Cummings eventually succeeded Little as director in 1970.

Throughout his term at SPNEA, Cummings continued to lecture and teach. He served as an instructor the New York State Historical Association's summer program in American material culture, Cooperstown, New York. In 1971 Cummings helped to establish Boston University's New England and American Studies Program. In 1982 Cummings taught a course at Yale University on New England architectural history, and in 1984 he was appointed Yale's first Charles F. Montgomery professor of American decorative arts, a position he held until his retirement in 1992. Cummings died at The Elaine Center, Hadley, Massachusetts.

== Selected works ==
- Architecture in Early New England, Old Sturbridge Village Booklet Series No.7, Sturbridge, Mass., published 1958
- Bed Hangings: A Treatise on Fabrics And Styles In The Curtaining Of Beds, 1650-1850, compiled 1961
- Rural Household Inventories: Establishing The Names, Uses and Furnishings of Rooms In The Colonial New England Home, 1675-1725, published 1964
- The Framed Houses of Massachusetts Bay, 1625-1725, published 1979

== Awards and honors ==
- 1979 L.L. Winship/PEN New England Award, The Framed Houses of Massachusetts Bay, 1625-1725
- 1998 Henry Francis du Pont Award from the Winterthur Museum, Garden and Library
