= Coffin House =

Historic house in Massachusetts, US

Coordinates: 42°48′00″N 70°51′48″W

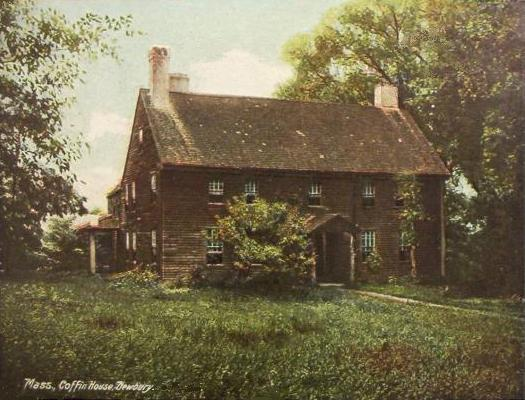
Coffin House circa 1907.

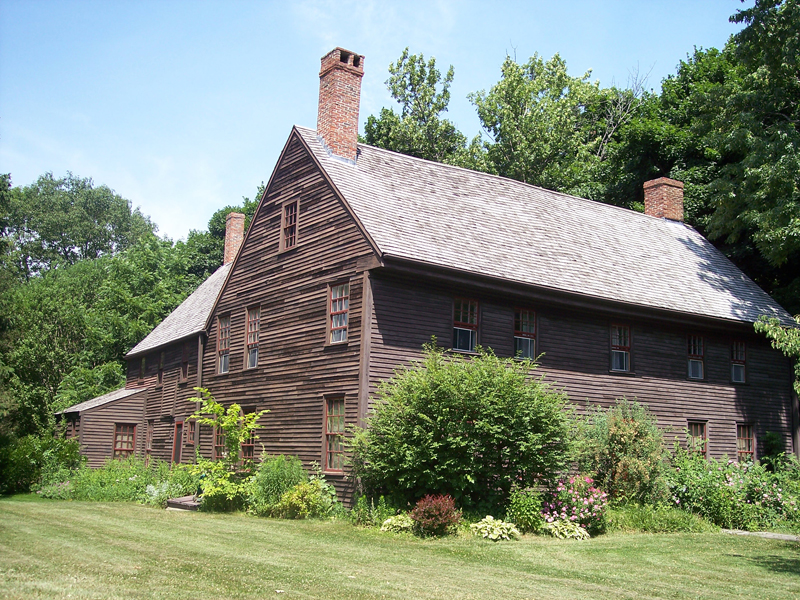
Coffin House, July 2007

The Coffin House is a historic Colonial American house, currently estimated to have been constructed circa 1678. It is located at 14 High Road, Newbury, Massachusetts, and operated as a non-profit museum by Historic New England. The house is open on the first and third Saturday of the month from June through October.

The house began in 1678 as a simple structure of two or possibly three rooms on land owned by Tristram Coffin, Jr, son of Tristram Coffin, who had left the area for Nantucket by this time. About 1713 the house was more than doubled in size, with new partitions added. In 1785, two Coffin brothers legally divided the structure into two separate dwellings, each with its own kitchen and living spaces. The property remained within the Coffin family until acquired by Historic New England in 1929.

Although the house was traditionally dated to 1654 (by Joshua Coffin, author of the 1845 history of Newbury), recent scientific studies have provided more accurate estimates. In 2002, the Oxford Tree-ring Laboratory analyzed wooden beams from the structure and ascertained that donor trees were felled in winter 1676–1677 and 1677–1678 for the original structure, and winter 1712–1713 for the addition. This revised dating means that the Coffin House may no longer be the earliest example of the principal rafter/common purlin roof, although even so it is certainly one of the oldest extant examples.

In 1785, two of the brothers of the Coffin family legally divided the house into two separate dwelling areas. The last Coffin-surnamed resident of the home was Lucy Coffin. Coffin House is owned by Historic New England.
