= Historic New England =

Nonprofit organization

Historic New England's brand and descriptor line. The organization was formerly known as the Society for the Preservation of New England Antiquities.

Historic New England, previously known as the Society for the Preservation of New England Antiquities (SPNEA), is a charitable, non-profit, historic preservation organization headquartered in Boston, Massachusetts. It is focused on New England and is the oldest and largest regional preservation organization in the United States. Historic New England owns and operates historic site museums and study properties throughout all of the New England states except Vermont, and serves more than 198,000 visitors and program participants each year. Approximately 48,000 visitors participate in school and youth programs focused on New England heritage.

Historic New England is a museum of cultural history that collects and preserves buildings, landscapes, and objects dating from the seventeenth century to the present and uses them to keep history alive and to help people develop a deeper understanding and enjoyment of New England life and appreciation for its preservation.

== History ==
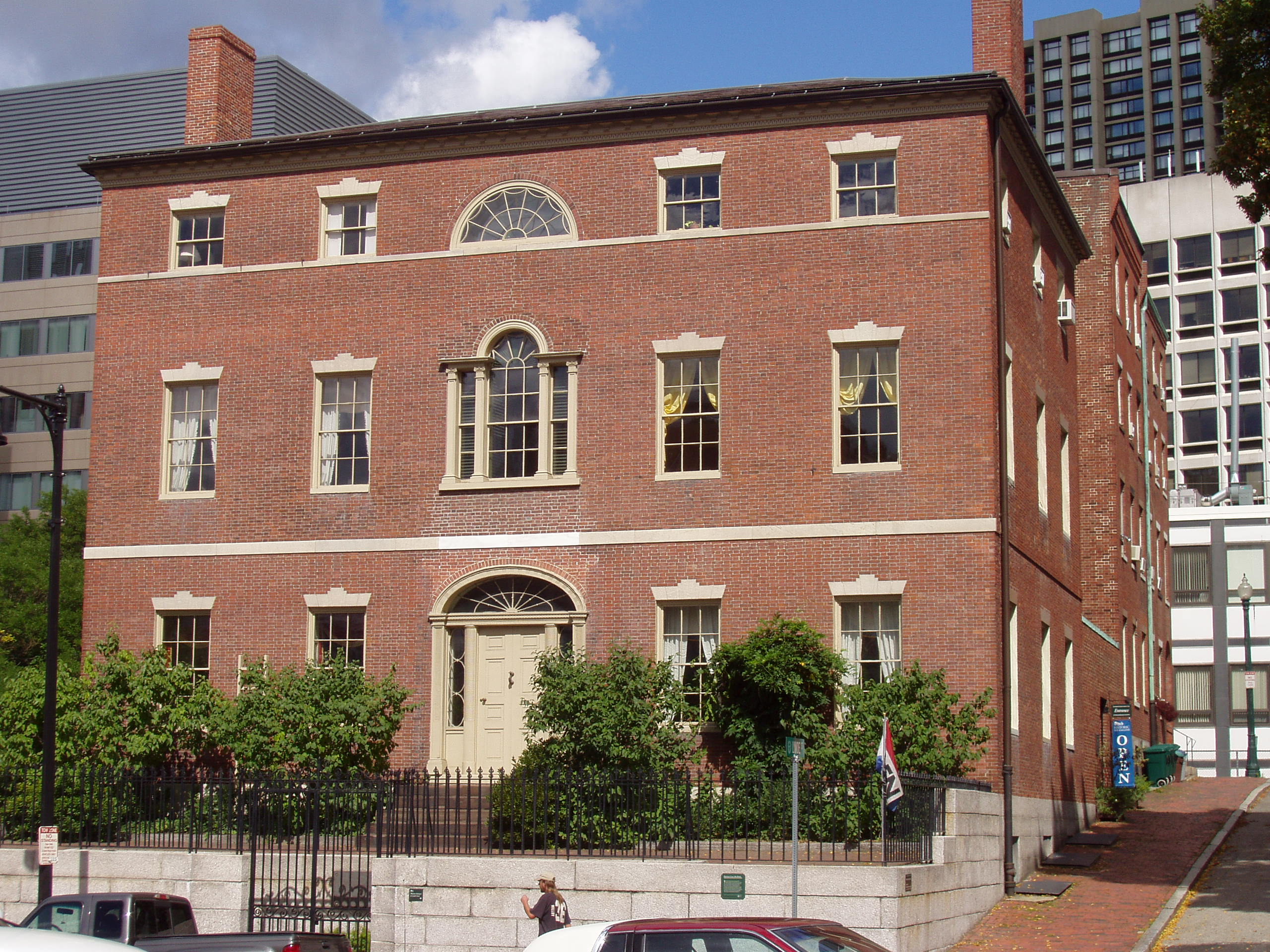
Harrison Gray Otis House, a historic house in Boston and the current headquarters of Historic New England

William Sumner Appleton Jr. founded the Society for the Preservation of new England Antiquities in 1910 for "the purpose of preserving for posterity buildings, places and objects of historical and other interest." Appleton had already been active in efforts to preserve the Paul Revere House in Boston, and the Jonathan Harrington house in Lexington.

Fearing that "our New England antiquities are fast disappearing because no society has made their preservation its exclusive object," Sumner Appleton and a small group of like-minded individuals founded SPNEA in 1910. By 1920, Director of Museums, Harry Vinton Long wrote in his report that the museum’s purpose is "to preserve and illustrate the life of New Englanders..." The history of New Englanders encompasses the stories of family life, immigration, school girls' routines, servants' duties, the enslaved Africans, and the products of masons, carpenters, and furniture makers. The first annual meeting was held at the 41 Brimmer Street Boston home of Mary Lee Ware, a noted philanthropist in the area as well at the patroness of Harvard University's famed Glass Flowers collection.

Accession records for 1910 list 19 items. Appleton considered everything from the mundane to the singular worth preserving, and so Historic New England's collection today ranges from everyday cakes of soap to extraordinary specimens of fine furniture. As a comprehensive heritage organization, Historic New England today cares for historic properties and landscapes; holds preservation easements and undertakes preservation advocacy work to protect historic properties; develops, maintains and interprets artifact collections; operates a library and archive; researches and publishes books and Historic New England magazine; and provides educational programs for children and adults. The organization's mission statement outlines its goals: "We serve the public by preserving and presenting New England heritage." The organization focuses on New England domestic architecture, collections, and stories.

Founder William Sumner Appleton was succeeded as Director by Bertram K. Little, Abbott Lowell Cummings and Nancy R. Coolidge before the title of the chief executive officer was changed to President, with Jane C. Nylander being the first to serve under that title. Carl R. Nold was president following Nylander, and since 2020 Vin Cipolla has served as the president and CEO of Historic New England.

The organization formerly included one of America's most prominent architectural conservation centers (the SPNEA Conservation Center), which pioneered a number of conservation techniques under research leader Morgan W. Phillips and his apprentices. Phillips is credited with coining the term architectural conservation.

== Properties ==
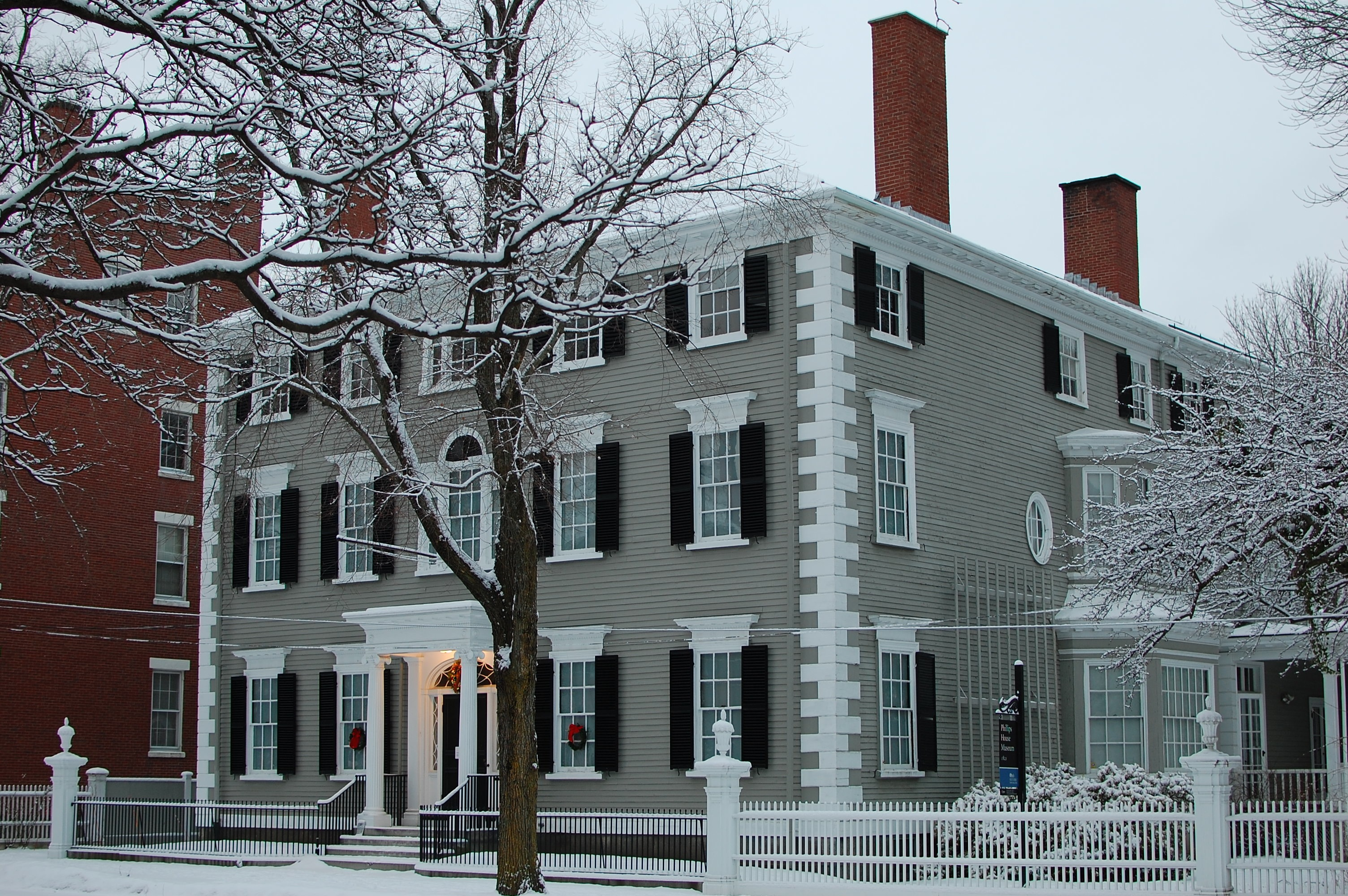
The Phillips House at 34 Chestnut Street, Salem, Massachusetts, owned and operated as a historic house museum by Historic New England and open for public tours

Historic New England currently owns and operates 37 house museums and 1,284 acres of farmland and landscapes across five New England states, representing nearly 400 years of architecture. It also owns a wide-ranging collection of more than 100,000 objects of historical and aesthetic significance, the largest such assemblage of New England art and artifacts in the country. It also archives more than one million items documenting New England architectural and cultural history, including photographs, prints and engravings, more than 20,000 architectural drawings and specifications, books, manuscripts, and other ephemera. The Collections Access Project, which provides Internet-based access to catalog data about many of the collections, went online during the organization's centennial in 2010. A Collections and Conservation Center is located in Haverhill, Massachusetts, in a former shoe factory building. While not open to the public, this facility provides for the proper care of collections and access to collections and collections information for curators, students and scholars. Other museums also rent space for collections storage in this facility. Historic New England also owns the Plum Island Airport, a small public general aviation airport located in Newburyport, Massachusetts on a site used for aviation since 1910. The airport is located on the property of the historic Spencer-Peirce-Little Farm, donated to the organization in 1971 and operated as a museum since 1986.

== Exhibition programs ==
A traveling exhibition program presents collections and research to the general public, in cooperation with other museums throughout the region. Exhibitions have included America's Kitchens, which appeared at the New Hampshire Historical Society in 2009; Drawing Toward Home, an architectural drawing exhibition that opened at the Boston University Art Gallery in November 2009 and traveled to the National Building Museum in Washington, D.C. during 2010; and a centennial exhibition entitled The Preservation Movement Then and Now, which appeared in all six New England states beginning in late 2009 and continued through 2013.

On line exhibitions include Jewelry at Historic New England, The Preservation Movement Then and Now, From Dairy to Doorstep: Milk Delivery in New England, 1860-1960 and New England Photographs of Verner Reed.

== Stewardship easement program ==
Through a conservation easement program established in the early 1980s, Historic New England holds easements on more than 120 (as of 2024) privately owned New England properties. It works with the owners of these properties to ensure the preservation of their character-defining historic features. The program provides comprehensive protection of exterior, interior, and landscape features and is considered a national model for the protection of buildings that remain in active use and private ownership. Approximately one-third of the properties in the program were previously owned by Historic New England and were returned to private ownership with preservation restrictions that continue in perpetuity. The balance of the properties were enrolled by current or former owners, who donated the deed restrictions to the organization along with endowment fund contributions. Endowment funds provide for the monitoring and enforcement of the easements, carried out by a full-time staff dedicated to that purpose.

== Membership programs ==
A Historic Homeowner program, available to all for an annual membership fee, provides information to those who own historic houses of any age, up to and including mid-20th-century homes. The annual membership includes two consultations with staff experts, one on historic paint colors, and a second on a topic chosen by the member, ranging from window repair to roofing materials, hardware source or historic wallpaper selections, or other topics needed for the care of historic homes. Other specialized membership programs focus on Gardens and Landscapes, and on young adults through the Young Friends program, and an upper-level membership society called the Appleton Circle provides benefactor support for organizational programs.

== Governance ==
Historic New England is a 501(c)(3) tax-exempt non-profit organization operating under the direction of a 15-member board of trustees.

== Museum properties ==
The following properties are open to the public. Most are open only during the warmer months (typically June to mid-October), and many are open only for limited days on selected weekends. Particularly fragile properties are open only a few days each year. The grounds and facilities of some properties (notable ones being the Lyman Estate and the Langdon House) are available for private functions.

- Connecticut: Roseland Cottage.
- Maine: Bowman House, Castle Tucker, Hamilton House, Sarah Orne Jewett House, Marrett House, Nickels-Sortwell House, and Sayward-Wheeler House.
- Massachusetts: Beauport, Sleeper-McCann House, Boardman House, Browne House, Codman House, Coffin House, Cogswell's Grant, Cooper-Frost-Austin House, Winslow Crocker House, Dole-Little House, Eustis Estate, Gedney House, Gropius House, Lyman Estate, Merwin House, Harrison Gray Otis House, Pierce House, Josiah Quincy House, Rocky Hill Meeting House, Spencer-Peirce-Little Farm, Stephen Phillips House and Swett-Ilsley House.
- New Hampshire: Barrett House, Gilman Garrison House, Richard Jackson House, Governor John Langdon House, and Rundlet-May House.
- Rhode Island: Arnold House, Casey Farm, Clemence-Irons House, Watson Farm.

== See also ==
- The Trustees of Reservations
- National Trust for Historic Preservation
- List of historic houses in Massachusetts
- List of historical societies in Massachusetts
