= Newbury, Massachusetts =

- Town
- Aerial view of the Lower Green

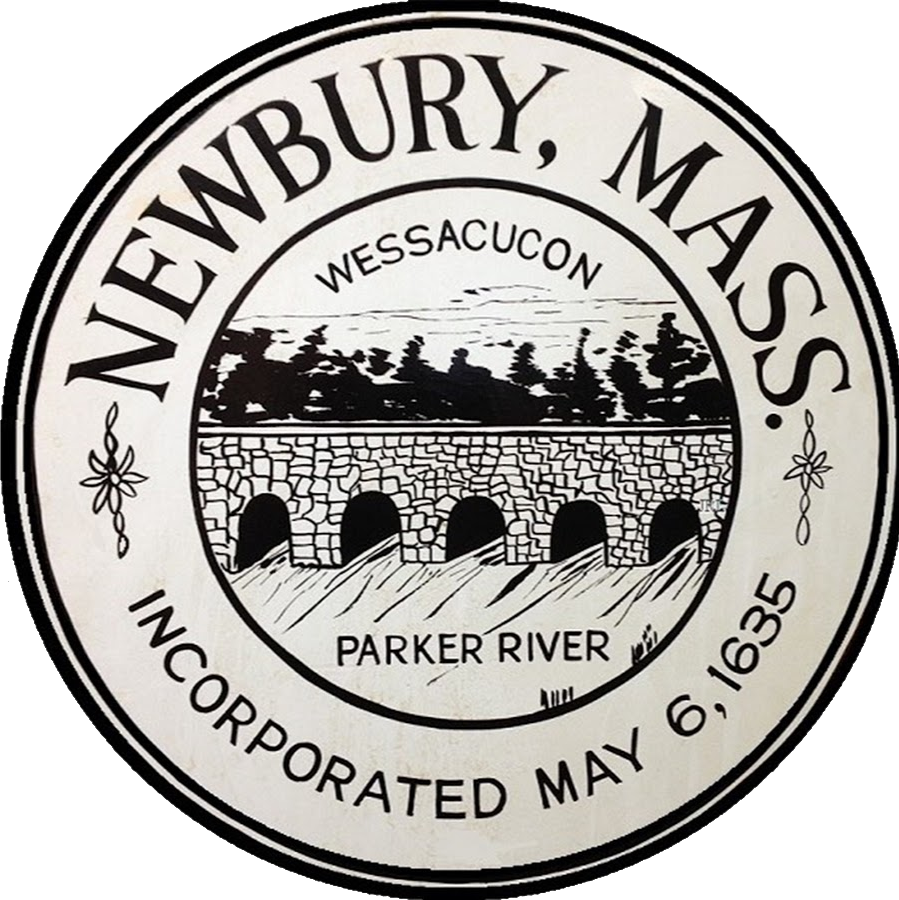
- Flag Seal

- Location in Essex County and the state of Massachusetts.
- Coordinates: 42°46′00″N 70°50′45″W
- Country: United States
- State: Massachusetts
- County: Essex
- Settled: 1635
- Incorporated: May 6, 1635

Government
  - Type: Open town meeting

Area
  - Total: 26.3 sq mi (68.1 km^{2})
  - Land: 23.4 sq mi (60.5 km^{2})
  - Water: 2.9 sq mi (7.6 km^{2})
- Elevation: 36 ft (11 m)

Population (2020)
  - Total: 6,716
  - Density: 288/sq mi (111/km^{2})
- Time zone: UTC-5 (Eastern)
  - Summer (DST): UTC-4 (Eastern)
- ZIP Codes: 01951 (Newbury); 01922 (Byfield)
- Area code: 351 / 978
- FIPS code: 25-45175
- GNIS feature ID: 0619452
- Website: www.newburyma.gov

Newbury is a town in Essex County, Massachusetts, United States. The population was 6,716 at the 2020 census. Newbury includes the villages of Old Town (Newbury Center), Plum Island and Byfield. Each village is a precinct with its own voting district, various town offices, and business center.

== History ==
Native Americans lived along the Merrimack River for thousands of years prior to European colonization of the Americas. At the time of contact, Pennacook or Pentucket controlled territory north of the Merrimack, while Agawam and Naumkeag controlled territory southeast and southwest of the river respectively. The original name for the land that would become Newbury may have been Quascancunquen meaning "waterfall," referring to the falls in Byfield where Central Street crosses the Parker River, and was likely part of the territory of Agawam sachem Masconomet at the time of contact. No formal agreements between the original inhabitants of Newbury and English colonists would be made until more than a generation had passed from settlement and the effects of virgin soil epidemics had significantly decreased native populations in the area.

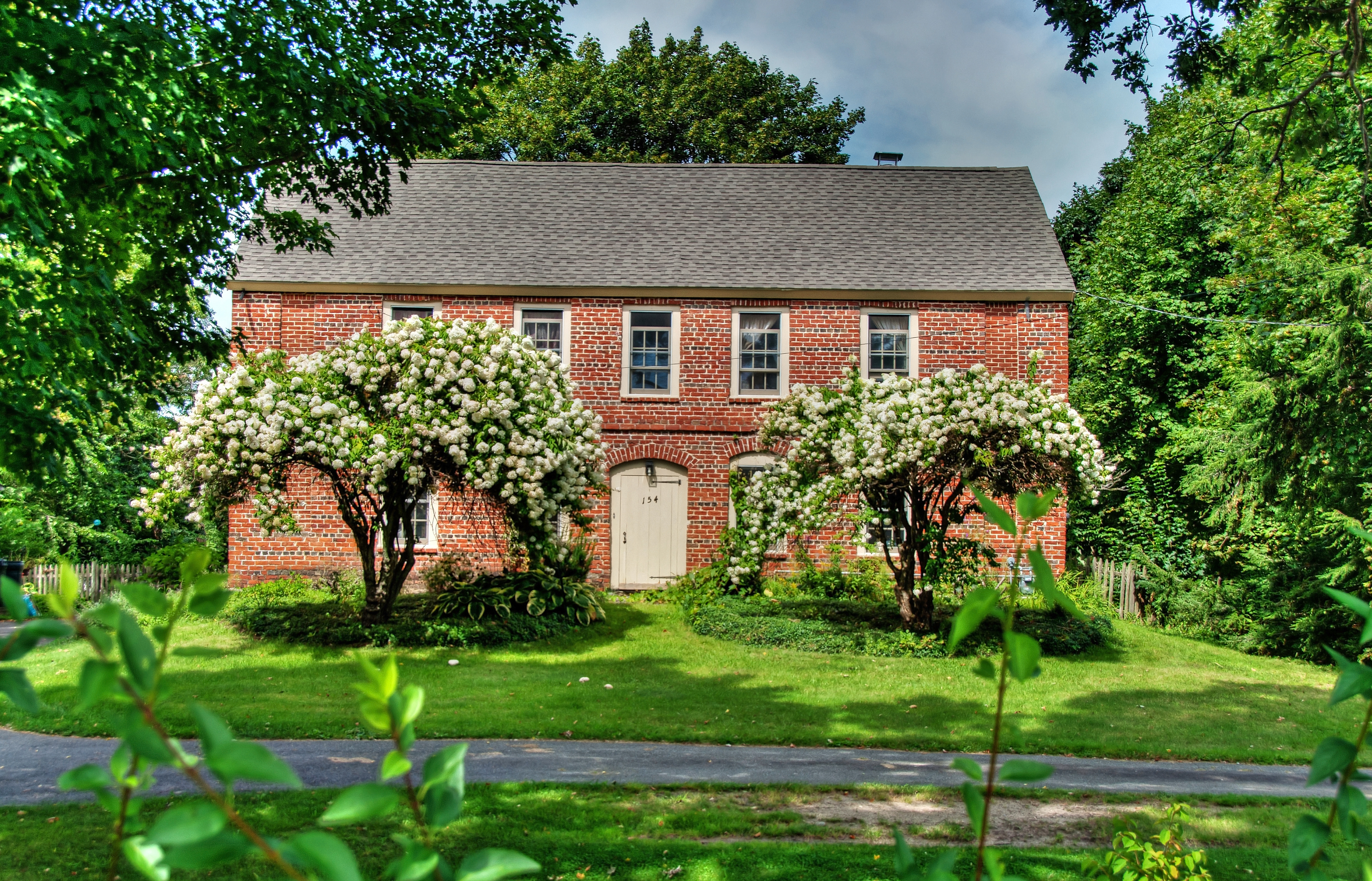
The Samuel Chase House, built ca 1715, is a rare example of a brick house built in that time period. The story handed down in the Chase family is that the bricks were made on the property and Hannah Chase carried them to the jobsite in her apron.

English colonists settled and incorporated Newbury Plantation in 1635. The Rev. Thomas Parker and cousin Rev. James Noyes, along with the latter's brother Nicholas, led a group of about 100 pioneers from Wiltshire, England. They sailed from the River Thames aboard the ship Mary and John, first landing in Agawam (now Ipswich) in 1634. They arrived the next spring at the Quascacunquen River, now the Parker River. A commemorative stone marks the spot where Nicholas Noyes was the first of the new settlers to leap ashore at Newbury, named after the town in Berkshire, England.

In 1650, 30 acres of modern day West Newbury referred to as Indian Hill was purchased by the town of Newbury from an indigenous man named Great Tom for three pounds. In 1681, the descendants of an indigenous man Old Will would sell one hundred and sixty acres to the town of Newbury for six pounds, thirteen shillings, and four pence. Finally, in 1700, the grandson of sachem Masconomet of the Agawam would relinquish his title to any lands in Newbury for a sum of ten pounds.

In 1791, 3,000 head of cattle grazed town lands, or on the region's abundant salt marsh hay. Other trades included tanning and shipbuilding. Newbury originally included Newburyport, set off in 1764, and West Newbury, set off in 1819.

In 1636, the first water-powered mill was established at the falls. Gristmills and sawmills were built, and in 1794, the first textile mill in Massachusetts. At Byfield in 1763 was founded the nation's first boarding preparatory school, Dum'r (Dummer) Charity School, known subsequently as Dummer Academy, Governor Dummer Academy, and now The Governor's Academy. It was also site of the first female seminary, founded in 1807. Byfield developed into a mill village, and once had six water-powered mills, manufacturing various products from woolens to snuff.

The railroad entered the community in 1850, carrying freight but also tourists, helping Plum Island develop into a Victorian seaside resort. Back on the mainland, silver was discovered in a large field in 1878, and the Chipman Silver Mine would begin operations until it finally closed in 1925. By 1905, however, the economy had shifted back to agriculture, and Newbury became a supplier of eggs, milk and poultry. Some would dig for clams or hay the salt marshes. The town is today primarily residential, with many examples of fine antique architecture.

== Geography ==
According to the United States Census Bureau, the town has a total area of 26.3 square miles (68.1 km^{2}), of which 23.4 square miles (60.5 km^{2}) is land and 2.9 square miles (7.6 km^{2}), or 11.17%, is water. Newbury lies just south of the mouth of the Merrimack River, and is drained by the Little River and Parker River, which, along with the Plum Island River, drain into Plum Island Sound, separating Plum Island from the mainland. Much of the town land is made of marshes, and is protected land, included in the Parker River National Wildlife Refuge, Old Town Hill Reservation Area, Kents Island Wildlife Management Area, Downfall Wildlife Management Area and parts of the Mill River Wildlife Management Area and Crane Pond Wildlife Management Area.

Newbury is located along the Atlantic Ocean, and is bordered by Newburyport to the north, West Newbury to the northwest, a small portion of Groveland to the west, Georgetown to the southwest, and Rowley to the south. The center of Newbury lies 19 miles (31 km) east of Lawrence, 19 miles (31 km) north of Salem, 32 miles (51 km) north-northeast of Boston and 24 miles (39 km) south of Portsmouth, New Hampshire.

Interstate 95 passes through the western part of town, with two exits providing access to the town. U.S. Route 1, locally known as the Newburyport Turnpike, passes from north to south through the middle of the town, and Massachusetts Route 1A's northernmost portion passes through the east of town, just inland from the marshes. The town is home to the Plum Island Airport, a private general aviation airport; the nearest national service is at Logan International Airport. The Newburyport branch of the Newburyport/Rockport Line of the MBTA Commuter Rail passes through town, with its northern terminus just over the Newburyport line.

== Demographics ==
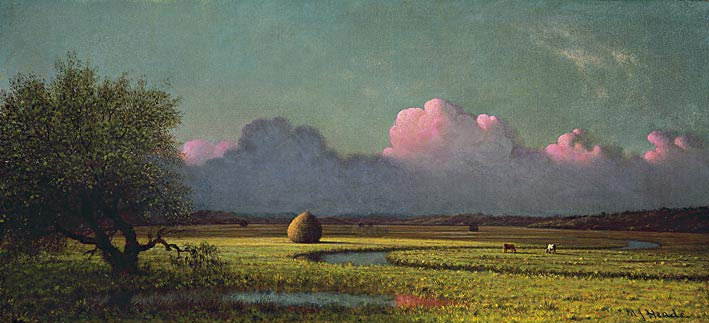
Sunlight and Shadow: The Newbury Marshes, c. 1871–1875, by Martin Johnson Heade

Historical population
Year	Pop.	±%
1790	3,972	—
1800	4,076	+2.6%
1810	5,176	+27.0%
1820	3,671	−29.1%
1830	3,603	−1.9%
1840	3,789	+5.2%
1850	4,426	+16.8%
1860	1,444	−67.4%
1870	1,430	−1.0%
1880	1,566	+9.5%
1890	1,427	−8.9%
1900	1,601	+12.2%
1910	1,482	−7.4%
1920	1,303	−12.1%
1930	1,530	+17.4%
1940	1,599	+4.5%
1950	1,994	+24.7%
1960	2,519	+26.3%
1970	3,804	+51.0%
1980	4,529	+19.1%
1990	5,623	+24.2%
2000	6,717	+19.5%
2010	6,666	−0.8%
2020	6,716	+0.8%
2022*	6,695	−0.3%
* = population estimate. Source: United States census records and Population Estimates Program data.

As of the census of 2000, there were 6,717 people, 2,514 households, and 1,815 families residing in the town. The population density was 277.0 inhabitants per square mile (107.0/km^{2}). There were 2,816 housing units at an average density of 116.1 per square mile (44.8/km^{2}). The racial makeup of the town was 98.32% White, 0.37% African American, 0.13% Native American, 0.45% Asian, 0.01% Pacific Islander, 0.28% from other races, and 0.43% from two or more races. Hispanic or Latino of any race were 0.91% of the population.

There were 2,514 households, out of which 35.7% had children under the age of 18 living with them, 61.5% were married couples living together, 7.4% had a female householder with no husband present, and 27.8% were non-families. 22.6% of all households were made up of individuals, and 9.1% had someone living alone who was 65 years of age or older. The average household size was 2.66 and the average family size was 3.16.

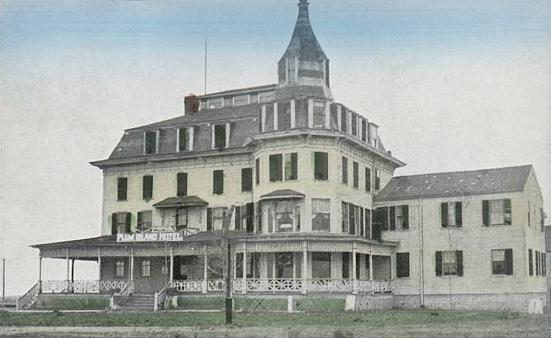
Plum Island Hotel c. 1910

In the town, the population was spread out, with 27.1% under the age of 18, 4.3% from 18 to 24, 30.0% from 25 to 44, 27.9% from 45 to 64, and 10.7% who were 65 years of age or older. The median age was 40 years. For every 100 females, there were 94.0 males. For every 100 females age 18 and over, there were 91.7 males.

The median income for a household in the town was $74,836, and the median income for a family was $83,428. Males had a median income of $52,366 versus $35,656 for females. The per capita income for the town was $34,640. About 1.2% of families and 3.1% of the population were below the poverty line, including 2.3% of those under age 18 and 9.2% of those age 65 or over.

== Government ==
Newbury presidential election results
Year	Democratic	Republican	Third parties	Total Votes	Margin
2020	62.45% 3,138	34.91% 1,754	2.65% 133	5,025	27.54%
2016	55.22% 2,465	38.44% 1,716	6.34% 283	4,464	16.78%
2012	51.29% 2,291	47.10% 2,104	1.61% 72	4,467	4.19%
2008	54.06% 2,326	43.76% 1,883	2.18% 94	4,303	10.30%
2004	52.93% 2,159	45.65% 1,862	1.42% 58	4,079	7.28%
2000	49.76% 1,866	41.15% 1,543	9.09% 341	3,750	8.61%
1996	50.80% 1,780	36.19% 1,268	13.01% 456	3,504	14.61%
1992	38.61% 1,405	33.36% 1,214	28.03% 1,020	3,639	5.25%
1988	44.97% 1,439	53.38% 1,708	1.66% 53	3,200	8.41%
1984	34.88% 945	64.64% 1,751	0.48% 13	2,709	29.75%
1980	28.38% 692	53.45% 1,303	18.17% 443	2,438	25.06%
1976	40.59% 932	55.97% 1,285	3.44% 79	2,296	15.37%
1972	36.14% 716	63.10% 1,250	0.76% 15	1,981	26.96%
1968	35.90% 639	60.67% 1,080	3.43% 61	1,780	24.78%
1964	51.10% 812	48.58% 772	0.31% 5	1,589	2.52%
1960	29.80% 473	70.13% 1,113	0.06% 1	1,587	40.33%
1956	16.82% 220	82.80% 1,083	0.38% 5	1,308	65.98%
1952	18.39% 217	81.53% 962	0.08% 1	1,180	63.14%
1948	22.21% 201	76.35% 691	1.44% 13	905	54.14%
1944	26.26% 219	73.50% 613	0.24% 2	834	47.24%
1940	24.66% 220	74.89% 668	0.45% 4	892	50.22%

== Education ==
Newbury is home to one public elementary school which serves K–6: Newbury Elementary School. Middle School students attend Triton Regional Middle School for 7–8, and high school students attend Triton Regional High School for 9–12, along with Rowley, and Salisbury. Along with 10 other towns and cities in Essex County, Newbury is part of the Whittier Regional Vocational Technical High School district.

== Points of interest ==
- Coffin House (1678)
- Dole-Little House (c. 1715)
- James Noyes House (c. 1646)
- Spencer-Peirce-Little Farm (c. 1690)
- Swett-Ilsley House (c. 1670)
- Abraham Adams House
- The Governor's Academy (formerly Governor Dummer Academy), a private preparatory school in Byfield
- Parker River National Wildlife Refuge (also in Rowley and Ipswich)
- Pink House, subject of controversial demolition vs. conservation debate

== Notable people ==
- Joshua Coffin, American antiquary and abolitionist
- Andre Dubus III (born 1959), author and short story writer
- Richard Dummer, settled in Newbury in May 1635
- William Dummer, Lt. Governor of the Massachusetts Bay Colony
- Jonathan Singletary Dunham, prominent early American settler of Woodbridge Township, New Jersey
- Moses Little, colonel of the 12th Continental Regiment during the American Revolution
- William Henry Moody, United States Supreme Court Justice, United States Attorney General, assisted in the prosecution of Lizzie Borden
- Samuel Moore, settled in Newbury in 1634, and then emigrated to Woodbridge, New Jersey, where he held many offices in the fledgling colony
- Theophilus Parsons, Chief Justice of the Massachusetts Supreme Judicial Court
- Eliphalet Pearson, first Principal of Phillips Academy (1778–1786) and Acting President of Harvard University (1804–1806)
- John Woodbridge, settled in Newbury in 1634 and married Mercy Dudley, daughter of Governor Thomas Dudley. He served as Town Clerk of Newbury from 1634 to 1638 and as Deputy to the General Court, 1639-40-41. He was ordained over the church in Andover, 24 October 1645

== See also ==
- Parker River National Wildlife Refuge

== Bibliography ==
- Coffin, Joshua (1845). A Sketch of the History of Newbury, Newburyport, and West Newbury from 1635 to 1845. Boston: Samuel G. Drake.
- Currier, John J. (1902). History of Newbury, Mass., 1635-1902. Boston: Damrell & Upham. OCLC 2303477. OL 6922835M.
- Noyes, Henry E.; Noyes, Harriette E., eds. (1904) [1897]. Genealogical Record of Some of the Noyes Descendants of James, Nicholas and Peter Noyes. Vol. I: Descendants of Nicholas Noyes. Boston: New England Historic Genealogical Society.
- Noyes, Henry E.; Noyes, Harriette E., eds. (1904). Genealogical Record of Some of the Noyes Descendants of James, Nicholas and Peter Noyes. Vol. II: Descendants of James and Peter Noyes. Boston: New England Historic Genealogical Society.
