= New England Museum =

Former museum in Boston, Massachusetts

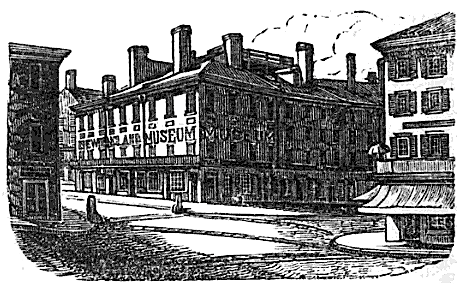
New England Museum, Court St., Boston, ca.1829

The New England Museum (1818 – c. 1838) in Boston, Massachusetts, United States, was established at 76 Court Street by Ethan A. Greenwood, Peter B. Bazin, John Dwight and Samuel Jackson. It featured displays of fine art, natural history specimens, wax figures, and other curiosities. Bands of musicians typically performed there during public hours.

== History ==
Around 1818, Greenwood bought Edward Savage's "New York Museum" art collection, and thus established the New England Museum. Artwork acquired included Savage's own paintings—a portrait of George Washington and his family (now in the National Gallery of Art); portraits of Henry Knox; portraits of Robert Morris; and Congress Voting Independence, a painting begun by Robert Edge Pine and completed by Savage.

Greenwood expanded the museum collections in 1821 by acquiring items from the estate of John Mix of New Haven, Connecticut. Mix's collection "consisted of wax figures as large as life, paintings, beasts, birds, fishes, serpents and reptiles, Indian and Chinese curiosities and 20,000 different species of insects preserved in glass cases. There were also 3 fine organs." In 1822 Greenwood acquired Philip Wood's Market Museum. He also acquired William Doyle's Columbian Museum in 1825; and the collection of Boston's Linnaean Society.

Financial difficulties forced the museum to close in the late 1830s. Around 1839 Greenwood's "assignees conveyed the collections [of the New England Museum] to Moses Kimball" who then founded Boston Museum and Gallery of Fine Arts.

== Events ==
Events at the museum included:

- 1818
  - September – "Sea serpent" caught by Capt. Rich. Also: "a large sun fish, a live alligator, two small live turtles, from the Island of Ascension."
  - September – Anniversary of MacDonough's victory.
  - November – 16-pound, 9-year-old "wonderful dwarf."
  - "Thanksgiving evening. Illumination, music, &c. ... A large apartment for wax figures will be opened this evening."
- 1819
  - February – 16-pound, 10-year-old "wonderful dwarf."
  - February – Washington's Birthday commemoration.
  - May – "A great number of new and interesting objects by far too numerous to be mentioned in an advertisement are now brought forward and arranged in a very neat and elegant manner. A first chop dandy, attired at all points in the most perfect style of modern fashion, and a beautiful modern fine lady, are just added to the wax figure apartments."
  - August – Signior Hellene concert. "He will play on the Italian violi—Pandean pipes—Chinese bells—Turkish cymbals, and tenor drum, at the same time; and astonishing to relate, all in unison and perfect time. He will also occasionally accompany the Italian violi with his mouth, in imitation of the mocking bird."

"A vast deal of Rational Amusement for very little money."

— Advertisement, Boston Commercial Gazette, 1824
- 1820
  - December – Museum "enlarged and improved by adding to it the lofty and spacious hall (lately the Gallery of Fine Arts) 70 feet by 36, fitted up in a tasteful and elegant manner."
  - December – "10 new wax figures are just added—among them, Caroline, Queen of England—Lady Hamilton—Bergami."
- 1822 – "Just added another entire museum, making now one grand consolidation of 4 museums united in one."
- 1824
  - November – John Ritto Penniman's painting The Congflagration of the Exchange Coffee House on display.
  - December 25 – Christmas Day: "open through this day and illuminated in the evening. . ... Handsomely dressed with evergreens."

== Images ==
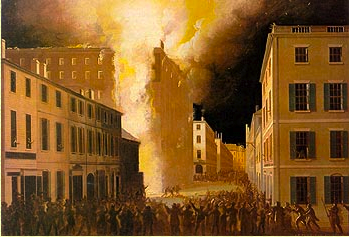
The Congflagration of the Exchange Coffee House by J.R. Penniman, 1824

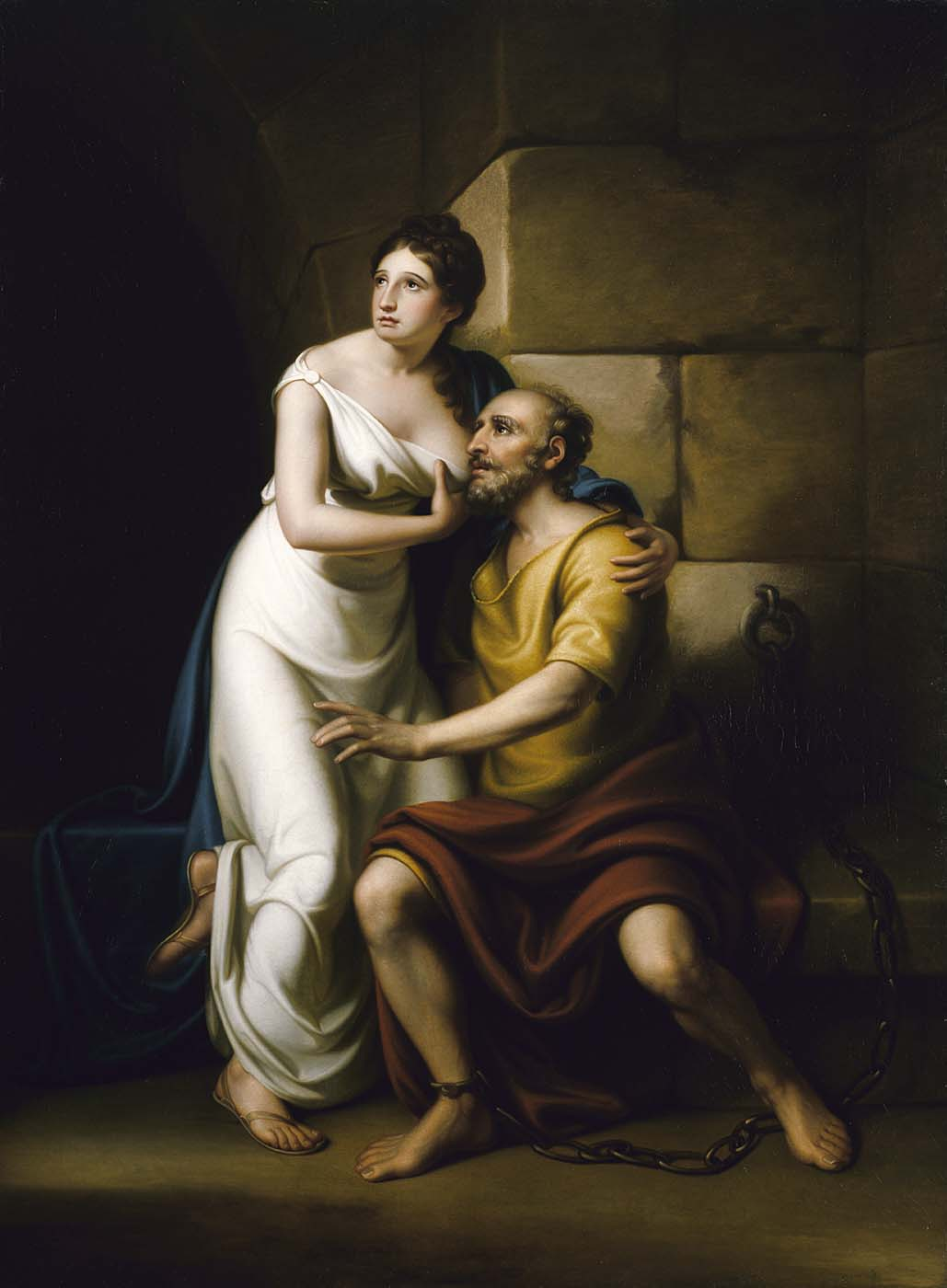
The Roman Daughter by Rembrandt Peale, 1811; on display in the museum ca.1829.

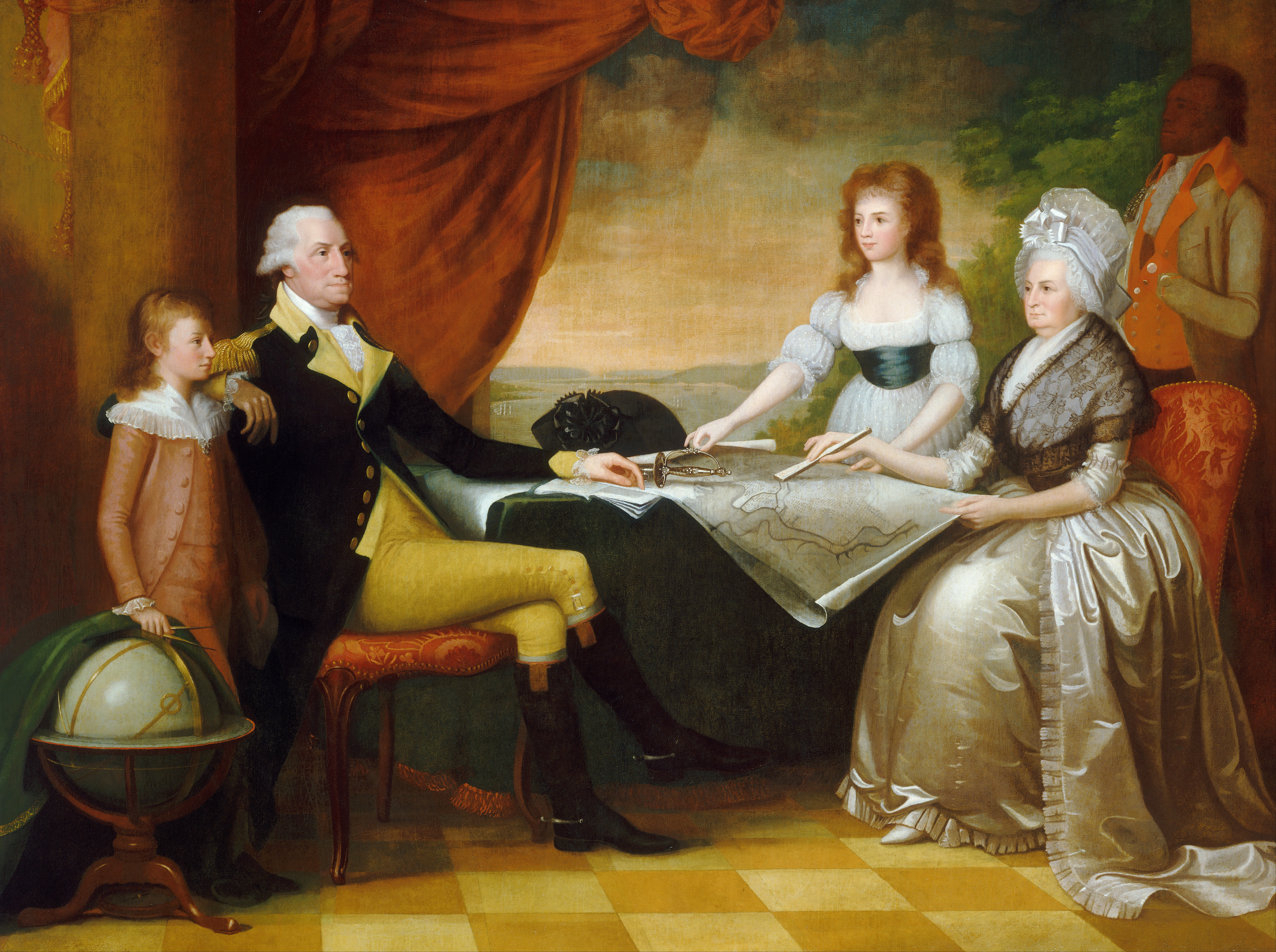
The Washington Family by Edward Savage, in the museum's collection

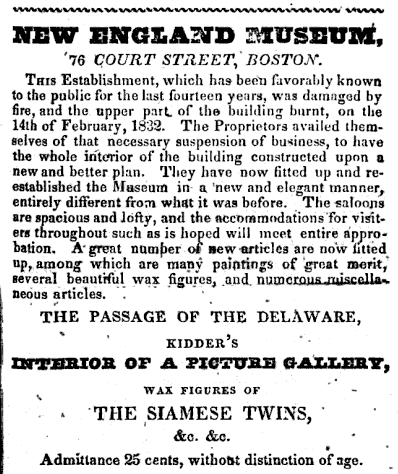
1832 advertisement
