= William Doyle =

William Doyle may refer to:

- Willie Doyle (William Joseph Gabriel Doyle, 1873–1917), Irish Jesuit priest and British Army chaplain
- William Doyle (Canadian businessman), CEO of the Potash Corporation of Saskatchewan
- William Doyle (historian) (born 1942), English historian
- William Doyle (Irish businessman), CEO of Newbridge Silverware
- William Doyle (died 1983), County Court Judge from Northern Ireland murdered by the IRA in 1983
- William Doyle (musician) (born 1991), English electronic musician, previously known by his stage name East India Youth
- William Edward Doyle (1911–1986), United States federal judge
- William P. Doyle, former Commissioner of the Federal Maritime Commission
- William M. S. Doyle (1769–1828), artist
- William T. Doyle (1926–2024), Republican member of the Vermont Senate
- James William Doyle, Canadian politician
