= Gottlieb Graupner =

American musician, composer, conductor, educator and publisher

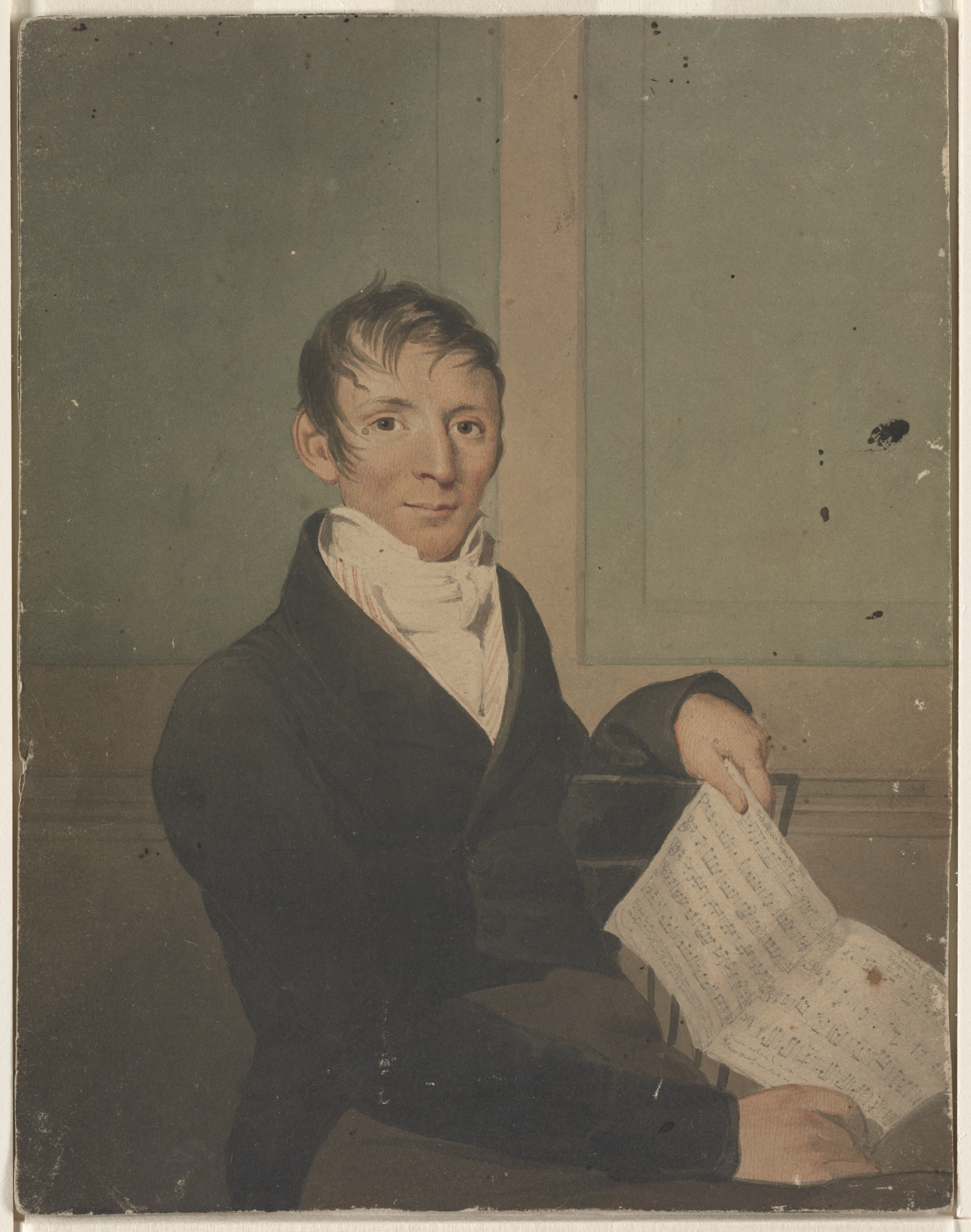
Portrait of Gottlieb Graupner by John Rubens Smith, 1809 (Library of Congress)

Johann Christian Gottlieb Graupner (6 October 1767 – 16 April 1836) was a musician, composer, conductor, educator and publisher. Born in Hanover, Germany, he played oboe in Joseph Haydn's orchestra in London. After moving to the United States in the 1790s, he co-founded the Philharmonic Society (ca. 1810–1825) and the Handel and Haydn Society (est. 1815) in Boston, Massachusetts.

Some historians call Graupner "the father of Negro songs", based on the reminiscences of performer Charles T. White (1821-1891). One historian of jazz writes: "In 1795...Graupner...arrived in Charleston, Virginia, from Hanover, Germany, listened to banjo music and Negro songs, and learned. In 1799, donning blackface, he introduced himself as 'The Gay Negro Boy' in an interlude between acts at the Federal Street Theatre in Boston. This was the beginning of Negro minstrels and minstrelsy." According to another account, thereafter "he specialized in popularizing Negro songs." However, more recent historians have cast doubt upon these claims.

In 1801, with fellow musicians Philip Trajetta and François Mallet, he founded a music academy in Boston, called the American Conservatorio of Boston. It was the first such institution in the United States and lasted just two years. He also founded what quickly became the city's most prominent music publishing concern.

In 1810 he organized the Boston Philharmonic Society to perform classical music in reaction to the non-classical syncopation of the fuguing tunes of William Billings. The society performed Beethoven's Eroica Symphony marking its North American premiere on April 17, 1810. He became "the musical oracle of Boston" from 1798 until 1815 when he was among the founding members of the Handel and Haydn Society. Around 1816 he directed the orchestra at Washington Gardens. He played concerts in Boston at the Columbian Museum, Conservatory Hall, and other venues in Boston and around New England. His wife, opera singer Catherine Comoford Hillier, also performed frequently.

As a music publisher, Graupner promoted the popular Rudiments of the Art of Playing on the Piano-Forte (Boston, 1806; 2nd ed., 1819), one of the earliest such volumes published in the United States, and possibly the first. He also published sheet music by numerous composers including Joseph Haydn, Ignaz Pleyel, Antonio Salieri, Henry Bishop, John Braham, John Clarke Whitfield, Muzio Clementi, John Davy, Johann Dussek, James Hook, Michael Kelly, George Kiallmark, Thomas Moore, Wolfgang Amadeus Mozart, Francis Panormo, William Parsons, Ludwig van Beethoven, David Dean Roche, John Ross, Oliver Shaw, and John Andrew Stevenson.

In Boston Graupner ran a music store at no. 6 Franklin Street, where he also lived. The store later moved to Marlboro Street and towards the end of his life he lived in Province House Court. He died in Boston in 1836.

== Images ==
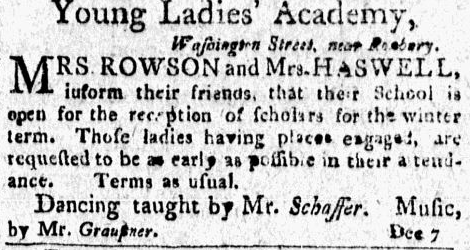
Graupner taught at Susanna Rowson's Young Ladies' Academy, 1808, on "Washington Street, near Roxbury"

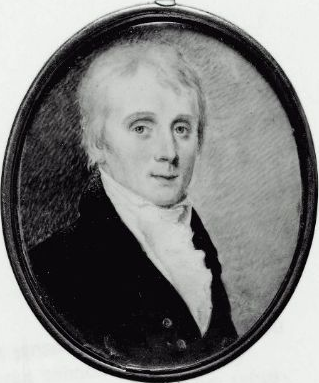
Portrait of Gottlieb Graupner by William M. S. Doyle, 1807 (Museum of Fine Arts, Boston)

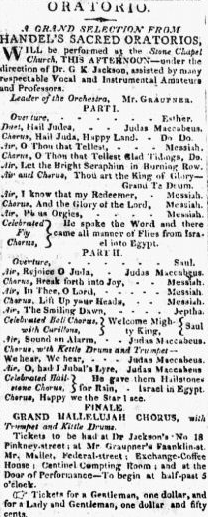
Advertisement for performance of Handel's sacred oratorios at King's Chapel, Boston, 1813. Graupner led the orchestra
