= Boston Museum =

The Boston Museum may refer to:

- Market Museum (Boston), 1804–1822, located in Market Square, Boston Massachusetts, and run by Philip Woods
- Boston Museum (theatre), 1841–1903, former theatre and museum located on Tremont St., Boston, Massachusetts
- Museum of Fine Arts, Boston, established in 1870. Located in Copley Square, 1876–1909. Currently located in the Fenway of Boston, Massachusetts
- Isabella Stewart Gardner Museum
  - Isabella Stewart Gardner Museum theft
- The Boston Museum, a project begun in 1998 to create a museum about Boston, Massachusetts
