= Oliver Shaw =

American classical composer

Oliver Shaw (March 13, 1779 – December 31, 1848), was one of the first American composers.

== Life and career ==
Shaw was born at Newport, Rhode Island. A childhood accident and later yellow fever caused him to go totally blind. He studied with organist John Berkenhead and later with Gottlieb Graupner. After studies, he started his musical career in Boston and in Providence where he remained an important musical figure until his death.

One of his students was Lowell Mason. In 1810, Shaw together with his friends founded the Psallonian Society "for the purpose of improving themselves in the knowledge and practice of sacred music and inculcating a more correct taste in the choice and performance of it" based in Providence.

His publications include five volumes of his own music and contributions to others. Many of his compositions were based on poems by Thomas Moore.

He died at Providence, Rhode Island.

== List of works ==
- Taunton
- The Bristol March
- Trip to Pawtucket
- "All Things Bright and Fair"
- The Bird Let Loose
- Souvenirs De L'Academie
- Arrayed in Clouds of Golden Light
- The Missionary Angel
- The Song of the Alumnae (with Miss Margaret Robinson, lyricist)
- Air
- Gov. Arnold's March
- Mary's Tears (1817)
- There's Nothing True But Heaven (1829)
- Stoughton Waltz (1839)
- Metacom's Grand March (1840)
- Gov. Bouck's Grand Quick Step (1842)
- Bangor March (1842?)
- The State Street Quick Step (1842)
- The Association Quick Step (1843)
- The Burgesses Corps Parade March (1844)
- The Rensselaer (Grand Waltz) (1844)
- Gov. Wright's Grand March (1844)
- Quarter Master Smith's Quick Step (1846)
- New York State Grand March (1847)
- Dolce Campana (Sweet Bells) Waltz (1848)
- Mansion Hall (Waltz Brilliante) (1848)
- The Elysian Isle (1850)
- Song of the Cloud (1850)
- A Seat Beside the Hearth of Home (1851)
- Miss Mary S. Johnson's Favorite schottisch (1855)
- Heber, variations (1857)
- Come to Me (Air Religieuse) (1857)
- Oneida Polka Brillante (with Charlotte J. Churchill, 1857)
- Three Waltzes Brilliante (1857)

== Discography ==
- Music of the Federal Era
- The Flowering of Vocal Music in America
