= Philip Trajetta =

Venitian-born American composer and music teacher

Philip Trajetta (Filippo Traetta) (January 8, 1777 – January 9, 1854) was a Republic of Venice-born American composer and music teacher. The son of Italian composer Tommaso Traetta, in 1800 he moved as a political refugee to the United States, where he had a successful musical career as a composer and one of the founders of music conservatories in Boston (1801), New York (1812), and Philadelphia (1828).

== Biography ==
Filippo Traetta was born in Venice, Republic of Venice, on January 8, 1777. He was the son of opera composer Tommaso Traetta and Elizabeth Sund from Russian Finland. The couple met at St. Petersburg when Tommaso was serving at the invitation of Catherine II of Russia as singing instructor and musical director of the opera there. Upon the death of his father, Filippo was about three years of age, placing Elizabeth in charge of his education in Venice. He attended a Jesuit school until the age of 13 and then studied with music teachers Fedele Fenaroli and Salvatore Perillo, from whom he learned counterpoint, the art of the fugue and composition. He was next sent to Naples to study with composer Niccolò Piccinni.

In 1799, Traetta was involved in a failed revolution against King Ferdinand IV of Naples. He was arrested for authoring several patriotic, anti-monarchy hymns. He served eight months in prison before he was given a German passport and smuggled into the United States, arriving aboard Mount Vernon, a vessel that belonged to the Derby family of Salem, Massachusetts, on July 3, 1800.

Now known as Philip Trajetta, he settled in Boston, Massachusetts. There he and two partners, François Delochaire Mallet of France and Gottlieb Graupner of Germany, announced in an advertisement in the Boston Gazette on November 24, 1800, the founding of a music academy called the American Conservatorio of Boston. It was the first such institution in the United States and lasted just two years. Two of his orchestral works were performed in Boston in that year, a sinfonia and a violin concerto. There he also wrote some of his early works, including "Washington's Dead March", a patriotic work marking the death of George Washington in December 1799, which remained popular for decades. (Note: The tune is mentioned in passing as if well known in some reports of the early persecution of the Church of Jesus Christ of Latter-day Saints, for example during the 1838 Mormon War. During the American Civil War, a letter to the editor of the Cambridge Chronicle in 1861 described the tune's impact when played at a Union soldier's burial: "I shall never forget the tide of emotion that swept over me as the mournful procession filed with funereal tread across our parade ground — their glorious band (and they have the best band on this side of the Potomac) playing Washington's Dead March. I have heard funeral music — have seen military men buried with the usual honors — but never till then did I feel in all its intensity the solemnity of the ceremony; — never did music stir me so deeply.") In the same year he moved to New York, where he completed The Venetian Maskers, which can be described as the first opera composed in the United States, though it was never staged. In the following two decades he divided his time between New York and Charleston.

He relocated to New York City about 1809 and by 1812 founded the American Conservatorio of New York. Advertisements for the Conservatorio's concerts at its home on Fulton Street appeared in local newspapers until 1817. He composed a cantata, Jubilate, Peace, to celebrate the Treaty of Ghent, signed on December 24, 1814, that concluded the War of 1812. He conducted its premiere in New York on February 21, 1815.

In the first half of the 1820s, Trajetta settled in Philadelphia, which became his permanent home. By 1828, he founded the American Conservatory in Philadelphia. There he composed two oratorios, Jerusalem in Affliction and Daughter of Zion, which had their premieres in Philadelphia in 1828 and 1829 respectively. A comprehensive history of the oratorio form describes them as "[p]resumably the earliest oratorios composed in America". Trajetta continued to give music lessons at the conservatory and to direct musical performances until his death.

Trajetta died in Philadelphia on January 9, 1854, and was buried in the Odd Fellows Burial Ground.

== Works ==
=== Cantatas ===
- The Christian's Joy: Prophecy
- The Nativity
- The Day of Rest
- Jubilate, Peace

=== Operas ===
- The Venetian Maskers

=== Oratorios ===
- Jerusalem in Affliction (Philadelphia, 1828; then Germantown, 1854)
- Daughter of Zion (Philadelphia, 1829; then Germantown, 1854)

=== Other musical works ===
- Washington's Dead March
- "The Sailor, An Elegy", for piano and voice (February 1801)
- "Lovely Maid the Fields Invite You", piano and voice(s)

=== Essays ===
- An Introduction to the Art and Science of Music (Philadelphia, 1829)
- Rudiments of the Art of Singing, Written and Composed for the American Conservatorio (Philadelphia, 1841-3)
- A Primer of Music (Philadelphia, 1843)
- Traetta's Preludes for the Piano Forte...Introductory to his System of Thorough Bass (Philadelphia, 1857)
