= Columbian Museum =

Museum and performance space in Massachusetts, US

Coordinates: 42°21′30.96″N 71°3′34.56″W

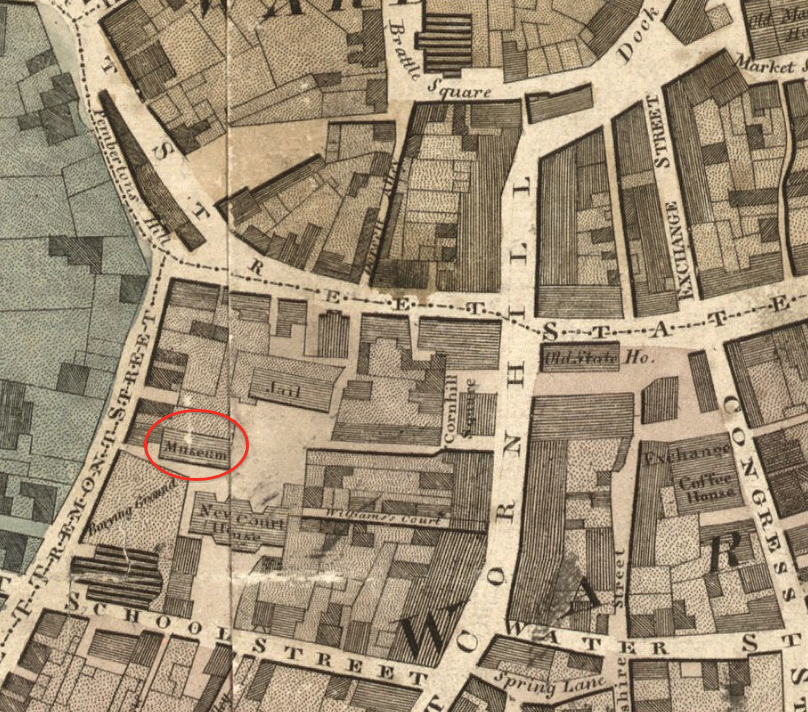
1814 map of Boston, showing location of the Columbian Museum, off Tremont Street and adjacent to the King's Chapel Burying Ground

The Columbian Museum was a museum and performance space in Boston, Massachusetts, established by Daniel Bowen, and continued by William M. S. Doyle. The museum operated during 1795–1825 featuring artworks, natural history specimens, wax figures, and other curiosities.

== Brief history ==
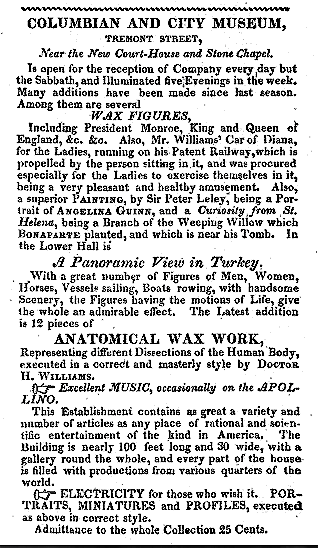
Advertisement, Boston Directory, 1823

Daniel Bowen (c. 1760–1856) established the Columbian Museum in Boston in 1795. Prior to this time, Bowen had overseen the display of "a few specimens of waxwork, at the American Coffee House, opposite the Bunch-of-Grapes, in State street. ...Additions of natural and artificial curiosities, paintings, &c., were constantly made to the collection till 1795, when it assumed the name of Columbian Museum." Located "at the head of the mall" near the Boston Common, the museum's collection included items from Edward Savage's "New York Museum."; paintings by Robert Edge Pine; and other curiosities. A newspaper advertisement for the museum in 1797 announces some of the top highlights on display:

"Concert clocks....
Elegant paintings....
Elegant Figures of waxwork, Large as Life, among which are ...The late King of France;... George Washington;... Dr. Franklin, sitting at a table, with the late Dr. Stiles, President of Yale College.... The New-York Beauty. The Sleeping Nymph. A Tea Party of Young Ladies, with a Servant Negro Girl. ...Sir Charles Grandison and Miss Harriet Byron. Charlotte weeping at the Tomb of Werter. Humphreys and Mendoza, the celebrated English Boxers.... The assassination of Marat... The late unfortunate Baron Trenck, loaded with large iron chains in a real Prison. An Indian Warrior, with his tomahawk, belts of wampum, &c. Two Chinese Mandarines, drest in the modern stile of that country....
With a great variety of Natural and Artificial Curiosities; Among which are a great variety of Birds, live Owls, Beasts, Reptiles, Serpents, (one of which is a Rattle-Snake, 9 years of age, and 4 feet in length,) Insects, Diamond Beetle, Glass Frigates, two feet in length, compleatly rigged and mounted with Glass Guns, &c."

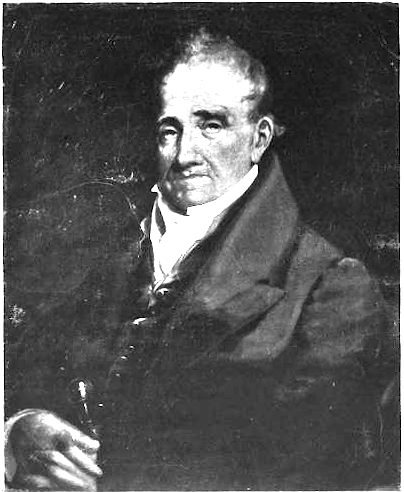
Portrait of Daniel Bowen, founder

In addition to exhibiting objects and animals, the museum provided a venue for performing arts such as musical concerts for organ and voice. In 1797, for instance, "Chalmers, Williamson, and Barrett ... gave an olio of readings lectures, recitations and songs... entitled 'Nature in Nubibus, or a Melicosmeotes -- an antidote for the spleen.'" In 1800, "the Columbian Museum will be opened and elegantly illuminated This Evening, Dec. 25. Music suited to the Evening on the Grand Piano Forte by Mr. Dolliver. Also the whole variety of the Concert Organ, and Musical Clocks performed on this occasion." In 1804, "Mr. Bates" performed a program of skits, stories, and songs, and also phantasmagoria (illuminated image-projection) featuring "Old Father Time -- A Female Spirit, rising from the Tomb -- The King of Terror -- The Ghost and Hamlet -- Washington -- The President of the United States -- A Bust of Dr. Franklin -- An Egyptian Pigmy Idol, which instantaneously changes to a Human Skull."

The museum enjoyed considerable popularity. One historian notes the broadening cultural effect of the "famous Columbian Museum, where New England began learning to be less provincial."

Bowen developed a number of side-businesses, including the Columbian Museum Press, an auction room, and retail sales.

The brief, dramatic history of the museum from 1803 through 1807 reflects the commitment and persistence of Bowen, his supporters, and loyal museum patrons. A fire on January 15, 1803, damaged the business; a few months later, the museum re-opened in a new location, on the corner of Milk Street and Oliver Street.

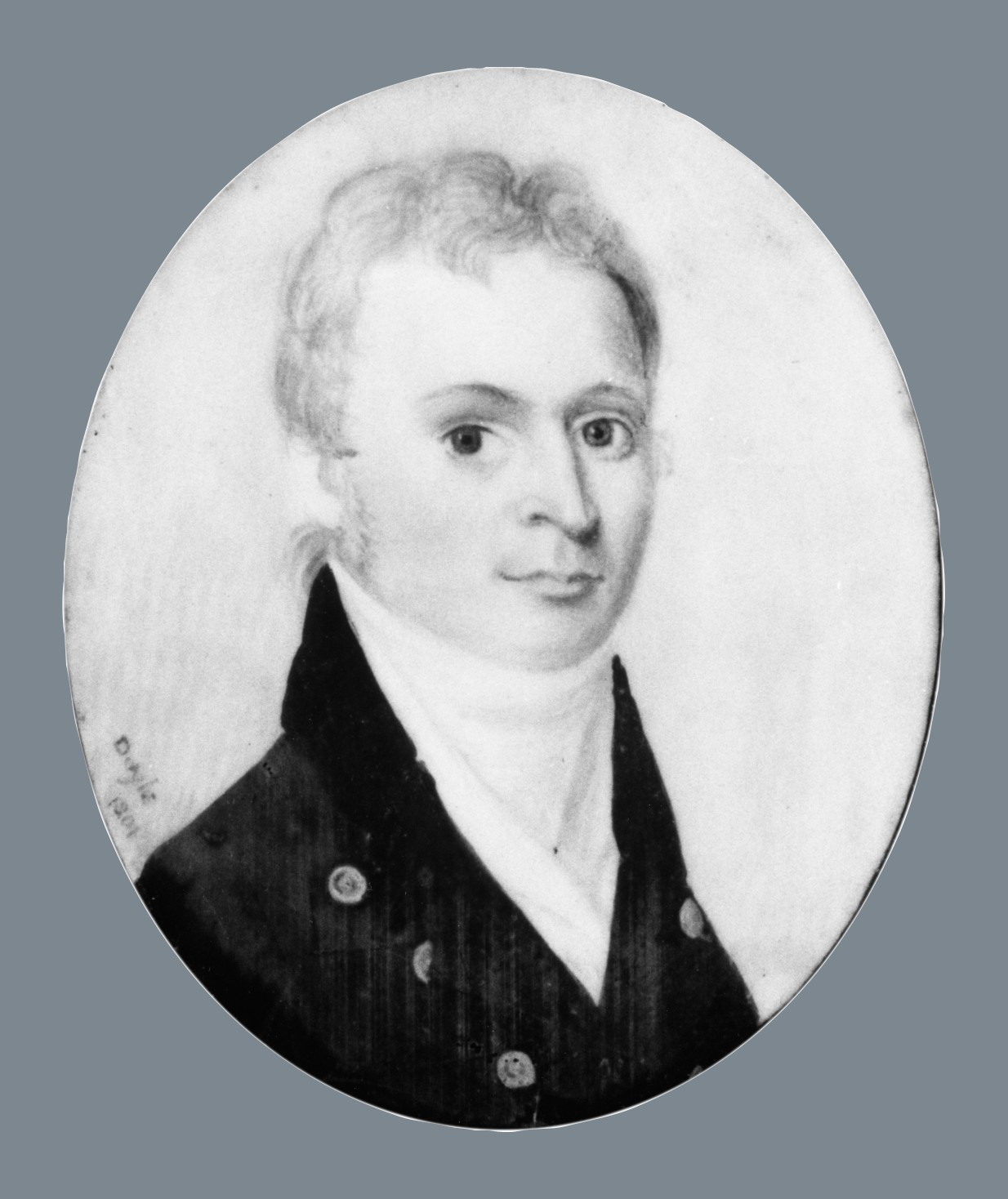
Self-portrait by William M.S. Doyle

In 1806, Bowen and William M.S. Doyle (1769–1828) moved the museum to Tremont Street, into their newly built "costly brick edifice, five stories high." The new building occupied the lot adjacent to King's Chapel Burying Ground. However another fire in 1807 wreaked havoc. The fire had begun "from the explosion of a preparation ... used in [the] exhibition of the Phantasmagoria, then occupying the upper hall." Several people were killed, and some wounded, when a wall of the burned museum building collapsed into the burying ground next door. "A large crown of spectators had collected in the burying-ground adjoining, when the walls fell, killing nine or ten boys, from 12 to 15 years old. Dr. William Eustis ...with other physicians lent his aid on the occasion." Bowen and Doyle rebuilt again, and re-opened the museum in a two-story building in June, 1807.

However, after 1807, Bowen suffered financial ruin, and withdrew from museum operations. Doyle assumed directorship thenceforth, until 1825, when Ethan Allen Greenwood acquired the collections for his newly established New England Museum.

== Selected performances ==
- Mr. Bates (1804)
- Mr. Dolliver (1800)
- Richard Potter (1811, 1818): "Mr. Potter will perform the part of the anti-combustible Man Salamander and will pass a red hot bar of iron over his tongue, draw it through his hands repeatedly, and afterwards bend it into various shapes with his naked feet, as a smith would on an anvil. He will also immerse his hands and feet in molten lead, and pass his naked feet and arms over a large body of fire. He will also perform a variety of pleasing magical deceptions; which, to give a minute detail of, would fill a volume. The performer, not being willing to anticipate the pleasure the audience may receive from his performance, flatters himself that he is so well known in different parts of this country, as not to require the aid of a pompous advertisement. In addition to his magical and ventriloquial talents, he will introduce a number of songs and recitations."

== Paintings exhibited ==
Some of the visual art ("elegant paintings") shown at the museum were listed in broadside advertisements issued circa 1798-1799:

List
- 1. An allegorical piece, representing America
- 2. Mr. Garrick, speaking the ode to Shakespeare
- 3. Mrs. Yates in the character of Medea
- 4. Scene in the 4th act of Hamlet
- 5. Scene in the 3rd act of King Lear
- 6. Scene in the 4th act of King Lear
- 7. Scene in the 4th Act of As You Like It
- 8. Mr. Lowndes and family, of Maryland
- 9. A beautiful Grecian lady
- 10. Medea and Jason
- 11. Garrick, resigning the stage
- 12. Henry the 5th, when Prince of Wales, surrendering himself prisoner to the Chief Justice, whom he had insulted
- 13. Miss Cadwalladers of Philadelphia
- 14. Henry the 5th, when going to France, detecting a conspiracy against his life
- 15. Boadacia
- 16. The surrender of Calais to Edward the Third
- 17. Canute the Great
- 18. The four seasons
- 19. Mr. Sterrett and family of Maryland
- 20. Mr. Hanson and family of Maryland
- 21. Mrs. Prichard, an actress
- 22. Charles Thompson, esq.
- 23. Mrs. Erskine, an English Lady
- 24. Mr. Hanson and family
- 25. An elegant fruit piece
- 26. Sir Anthony van Dyck
- 27. Mr. Henderson, in Comus
- 28. A Spaniard
- 29. Venus, Cupid and Satyr
- 30. Mrs. Morris, of Philadelphia
- 31. A house & garden in England
- 32. Contemplation
- 33. A pastoral concert
- 34. Mr. Lee of Virginia
- 35. A mad woman in chains
- 36. Mrs. Hacket, of Maryland
- 37. Time clipping Cupid's wings
- 38. Mr. Carrol of Maryland
- 39. George the 2nd, late king of England
- 40. Mary, Queen of Scots
- 41. The beautiful Susannah
- 42. An English lady
- 43. Mr. Randolph, late Secretary of State
- 44. Vision of the cross of St. Helena
- 45. Miss Smith, of Baltimore
- 46. A beautiful young lady
- 47. A mad woman, in prison
- 48. Bellisarius, the philosopher
- 49. Admiral Keppell
- 50. Time clipping cupid's wings
- 51. Bachus, Ceres and Cupid
- 52. Mr. Garrick
- 53. Pomona and Vertumnus
- 54. An African woman
- 55. Rubens, a celebrated painter
- 56. An old philosopher
- 57. A fruit piece
- 58. Mr. Garrick
- 59. President of the U. States
- 60. Mrs. Garrick
- 61. Cupid unmasked
- 62. A Roman matron
- 63. A young wanton
- 63. An Indian princess
- 65. A fancy piece
- 66. General Washington
- 67. Mrs. Rubens
- 68. Duke of Norfolk
- 69. G. Washington's resignation
- 70. [Haniman?], painted by himself
- 71. Duchess of Devonshire
- 72. President of the U. States
- 73. Vandyke, painted by himself
- 74. One of the muses
- 75. Mrs. Prichard, an actress
- 76. Diana
- 77. A school boy, reading
- 78. Aurora and nymphs dancing
- 79. An old man
- 80. A London cryer
- 81. Col. Humphries
- 82. Mrs. Pine
- 83. Mrs. Howard of Annapolis
- 84. Alderman Beckford of London
- 85. A young student
- 86. Somnus and Cupid
- 87. Somnus
- 88. An Egyptian fortune-teller
- 89. Samuel Chace, Esq.
- 90. Duke of Brunswick
- 91. Children, by Rubens
- 92. Mr. Garrick
- 93. Dr. Tilton, of Delaware
- 94. John Wilkes
- 95. B. Hawkins, N. Carolina
- 96. Gov. Spaight, N. Carolina
- 97. Flemish peasant's family
- 98. The death of General Wolf
- 99. Mrs. Howard of Maryland
- 100. Fanny, the gipsy, in the maid of the mill
- 101. The present Emperor of China, drawn from life
- 102. The present Empress of China, drawn from life
- 103-108. Six elegant views of different parts of the East-Indies, drawn from nature, by the Chinese painters
- 109. His Excellency John Hancock, late Governor of Massachusetts, painted by Mr. Copley
- 110. The death of Capt. Cooke
- 111. Virgin May and infant
- 112. A beautiful nun at her evening devotion
- 113. The late Honorable Thomas Hancock, Esquire
