= Prince Demah =

American painter

- Born: c. 1745
- Died: 1778
- Education: Robert Edge Pine
- Known for: painting
- Notable work: Portrait of William Duguid, Portrait of Henry Barnes, Portrait of Christian Barnes

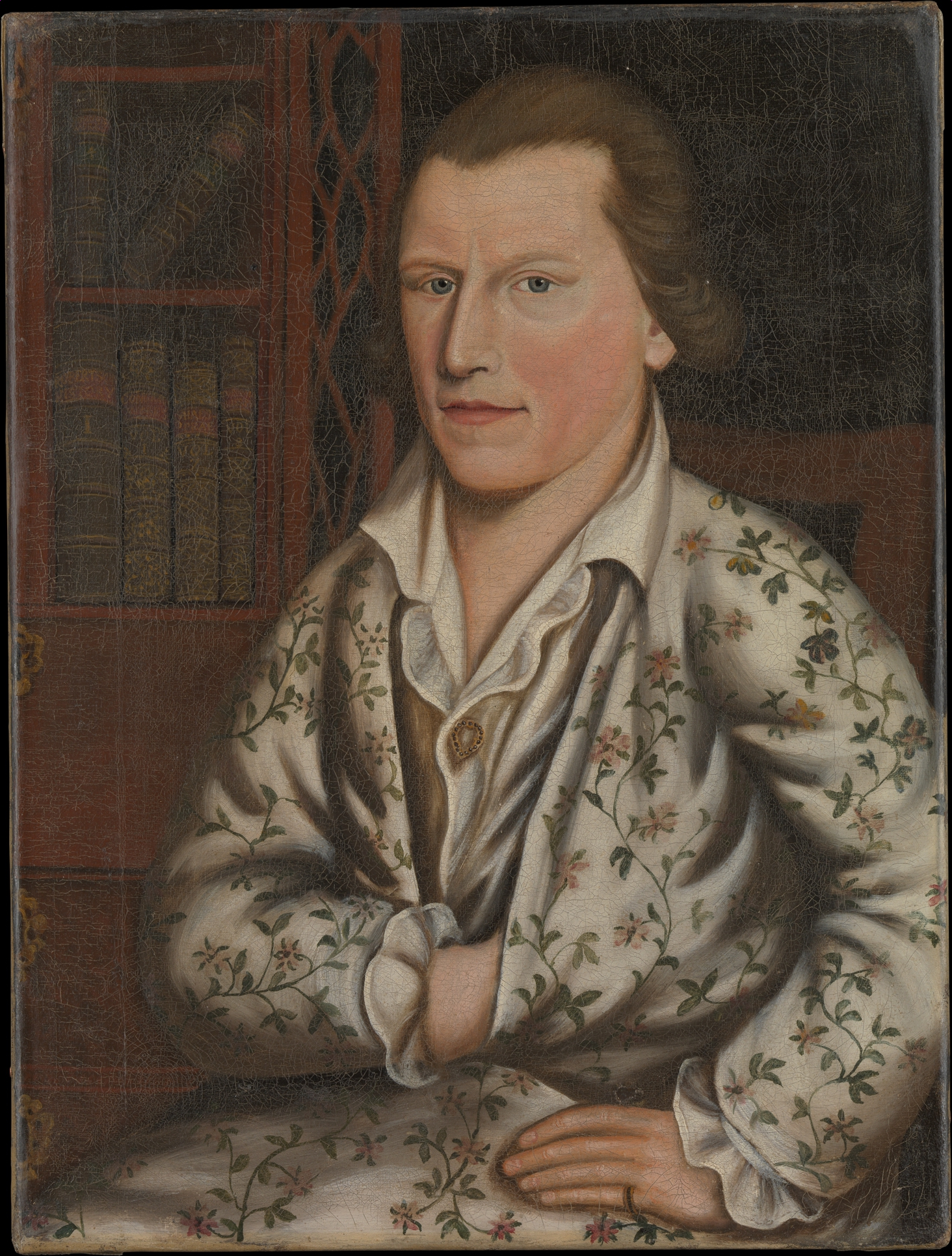
Portrait of William Duguid, (1773), Metropolitan Museum of Art

Prince Demah (c. 1745—March 1778) was an American painter of African ancestry who was formerly enslaved and active in Boston in the late 1700s. According to The Metropolitan Museum of Art, Demah is "the only known enslaved artist working in colonial America whose paintings have survived."

== Life and career ==
Demah's mother was an enslaved woman named Daphney. Both he and his mother were baptized at Trinity Church, Boston, in 1745.

Demah's purchase by Henry Barnes, a Boston merchant, was recorded in November 1769. Barnes stated that he purchased Demah with the intention of "improving his genius in painting". In October 1770, Barnes took Demah with him on a trip to London. In February of the following year, Barnes recorded that Demah received lessons from "Mr. Pine who has taken him purely for his genius". It is thought that this was the English painter Robert Edge Pine, who was working in London at the time and later settled in Philadelphia.

There are three known surviving portraits by Demah. His portrait of William Duguid, a Scottish immigrant textile merchant based in Boston, is in the collection of the Metropolitan Museum of Art in New York City. The artist signed Duguid's portrait "Prince Demah Barnes" and dated it 1773. The portraits of his owners Henry and Christian Barnes of Marlborough, Massachusetts, which were given to the Hingham Historical Society by Susan Barker Willard, although unsigned, are also thought to be by Demah.

The Barneses were loyalists and fled to England in 1775 after a series of threatening incidents, including the tarring and feathering of Henry Barnes's horse. Demah remained in Boston. In April 1777, at the outbreak of the American Revolutionary War, Demah enlisted in the Massachusetts militia as a free man. The enlistment records show he identified himself as only "Prince Demah", discarding his former enslaver's name.

Demah died of an unknown illness, likely smallpox, the following year. On March 11, 1778, he wrote his will, which he signed as "Prince Demah of Boston...a limner" and a "free Negro." Demah bequeathed his estate to his "Loving Mother Daphne Demah". His burial was recorded a week later at Trinity Church, Boston.
