= Newbridge Silverware =

Irish silver and jewellery maker

Coordinates: 53°10′34″N 6°47′48″W

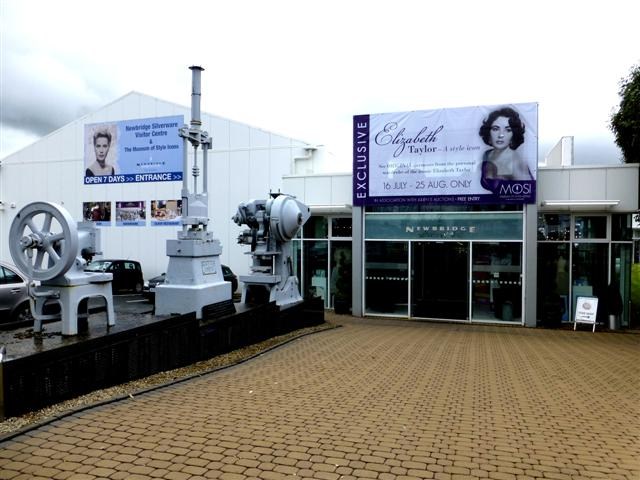
- Headquarters in Newbridge
- Industry: Silverware, jewellery
- Founded: 1934
- Headquarters: Newbridge, County Kildare, Ireland
- Key people: William Doyle (CEO)
- Revenue: €11.62 million (2021)
- Net income: ▼€1.93 million (2021)
- Website: Official website

Newbridge Silverware is a designer and producer of jewellery, homeware and giftware products.

== History ==
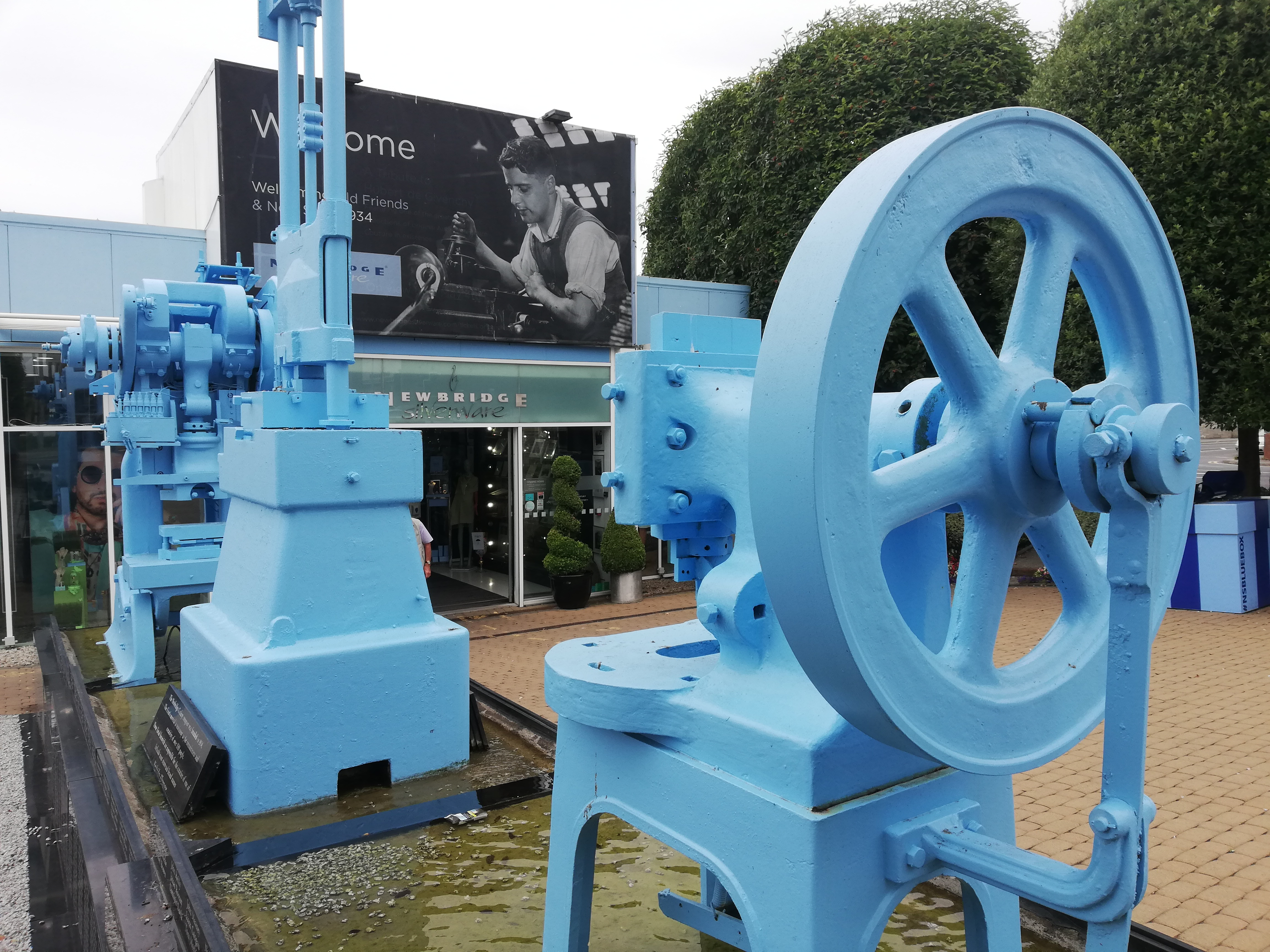
Preserved machinery at Newbridge headquarters

Newbridge Silverware was founded in 1934 as a homeware manufacturer. It is based in Newbridge, County Kildare.

In 1993, William Doyle took over as chief executive after his father, Dominic, died. Under Doyle the company expanded its product lines to include jewellery.

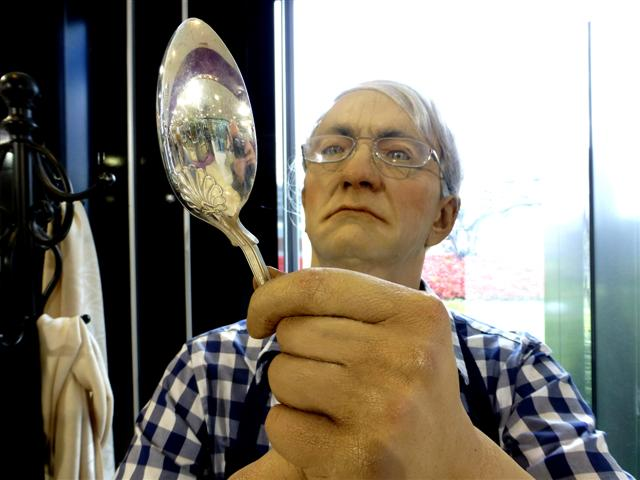
A Newbridge silversmith

In 2007, the Museum of Style Icons was established at the Newbridge store and contains pieces of fashion history, including the hot pink cocktail dress worn by Audrey Hepburn in Breakfast at Tiffany's. The museum also contains clothing and other memorabilia associated with Marilyn Monroe, the Beatles, Elvis Presley, Betty White, Tippi Hedren and Princess Diana. In 2014, the company reported sales of €21.5 million.

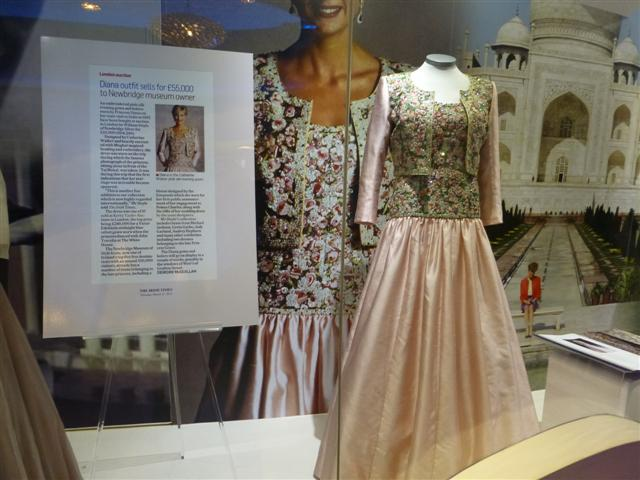
Dress belonging to Princess Diana at the Museum of Style Icons

Newbridge Silverware brand ambassadors have included Yasmin Le Bon, Sophie Dahl, Ronan O'Gara, Rob Kearney, Rozanna Purcell, Amy Huberman and Naomi Campbell, among others.
