= Ethan Allen Greenwood =

American lawyer and painter (1779–1856)

Ethan Greenwood
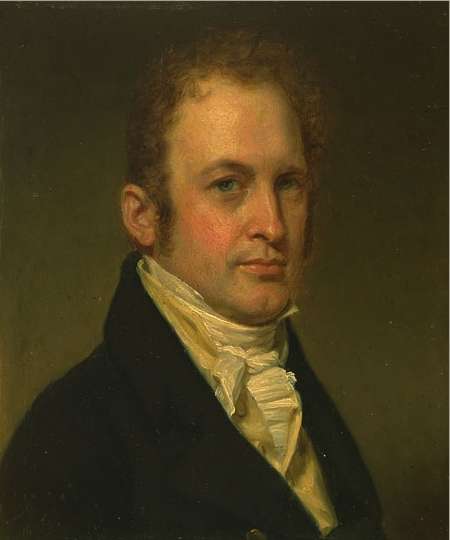
- Self-portrait, c. 1805
- Born: May 27, 1779; Hubbardston, Massachusetts, United States
- Died: May 3, 1856 (aged 76)
- Burial place: Hubbardston, Massachusetts, United States
- Education: Dartmouth College
- Spouse: Caroline Warren (m. 1829)
- Parent(s): Moses Greenwood; Betsy Dunlap

Ethan Allen Greenwood (May 27, 1779 – May 3, 1856) was an American lawyer, portrait painter, and entrepreneurial museum proprietor in Boston, Massachusetts, in the early 19th century. He established the New England Museum in 1818.

== Biography ==
Greenwood was born in Hubbardston, Massachusetts, to Moses Greenwood and Betsy Dunlap, May 27, 1779. He attended school at the Academy at New Salem, and the Leicester Academy. In 1806 he graduated from Dartmouth College. He also studied at West Point. Between 1801 and 1825, Greenwood produced many portraits, perhaps as many as 800 works. He utilized the physiognotrace technique. He kept a studio in Boston c. 1813 and associated with other artists, including Gilbert Stuart. He joined the Ancient and Honorable Artillery Company of Massachusetts in 1814. He married Mrs. Caroline Carter Warren of Roxbury, Massachusetts in 1829. After the deaths of his parents he built a large house on their land and he became active in the public and business affairs of Hubbardston.

Throughout his life, Greenwood kept a diary. On reviewing some of the diary entries, one scholar observed he "each day recorded both the weather and the title of the book he was reading ... and occasionally noted the library from which the volume was borrowed—the Adelphi Fraternity Library, the Social Friends Library [of Dartmouth College], or the unnamed circulating library he joined in 1806." His diaries now reside in the collection of the American Antiquarian Society. Entries from 1824 capture the details of Greenwood's life as a museum director:

"June 1st, 1824. A Mermaid arrived here last week & I agreed to exhibit it. Busy setting up Shark. --

2nd. Purchased some Indian Curiosities. -- 3rd. Bought four figures of an Italian $4.00. -- 5th. Bought four Busts of Voltaire, filling up jars of reptiles.... -- 7th. Artillery Election good run of business & in the eve a 'Glorious House' $342.75. Best day since the Museum began. --

10th. Bought a young Shark."

The New England Museum enjoyed considerable popularity. Greenwood also established museum branches in Portland, Maine, and Providence, Rhode Island. However, between 1834–1839 he experienced financial difficulties and, as a result, "his assignees conveyed the collections [of the New England Museum] to Moses Kimball." Kimball would then found the Boston Museum and Gallery of Fine Arts, a theatre and exhibit hall, featuring a portion of Greenwood's collection; Kimball sold the other portion of Greenwood's collection to a museum effort in Lowell, Massachusetts, in 1840. Greenwood died May 3, 1856, and is buried in Hubbardston.

== See also ==
- New-England Museum (Boston)
