= Congress Voting Independence =

18th Century Painting

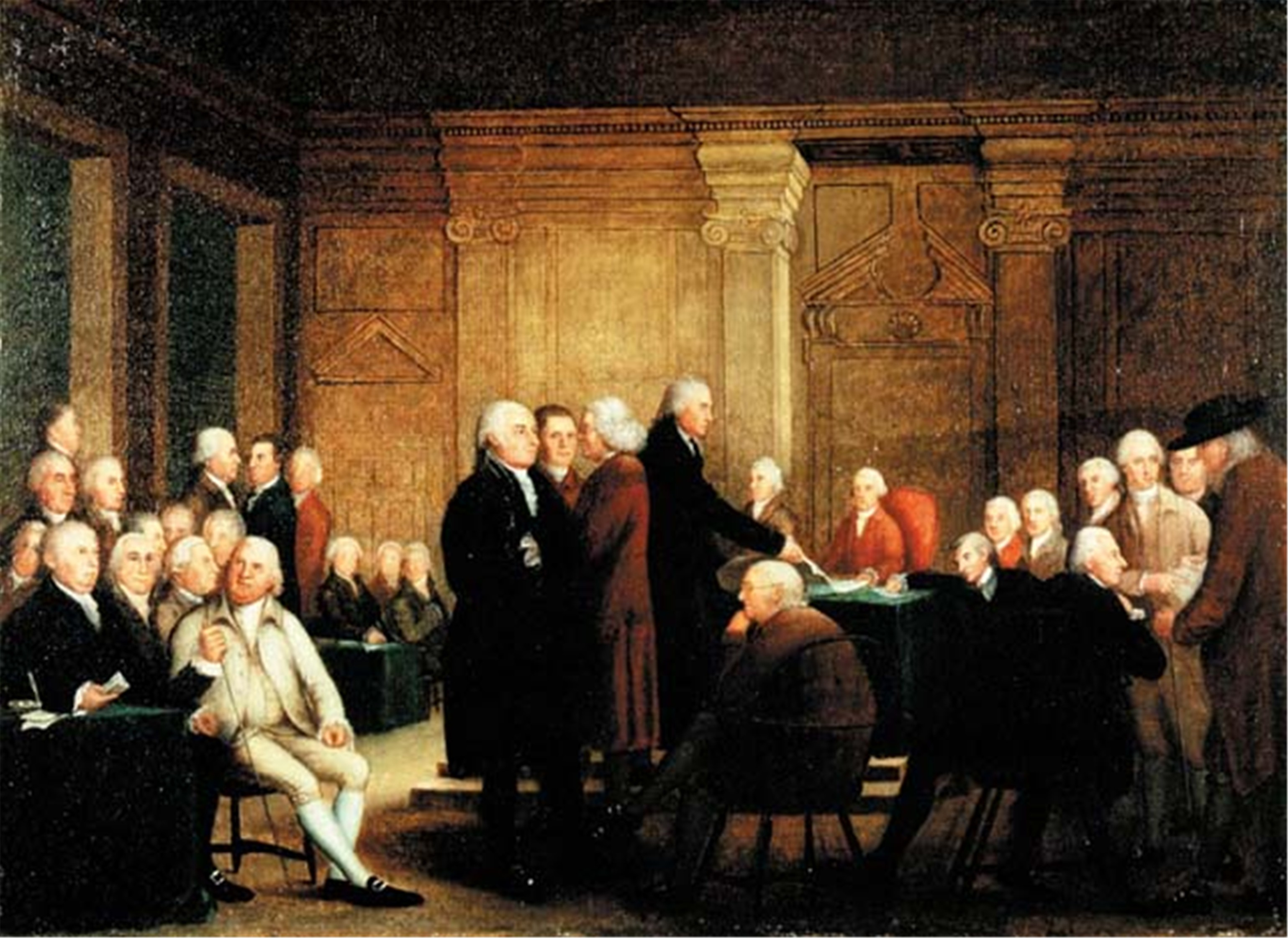
- Artist: Robert Edge Pine
- Year: c. 1784 to 1788 (unfinished at the time of Robert Edge Pine's death)
- Location: Independence National Historical Park, Philadelphia, Pennsylvania, U.S.

Congress Voting Independence is a painting by Robert Edge Pine showing the interior of Independence Hall in Philadelphia. It includes portraits of most of the signers of the United States Declaration of Independence. The artist worked on the painting from 1784 until his death in 1788. The painting is unfinished. The work is currently part of the collections of Independence National Historical Park in Philadelphia.

== Identification of portraits ==
Most of the Founding Fathers in the portrait can be identified. The central figures are the Committee of Five, which was charged by the Second Continental Congress with drafting the Declaration of Independence, including (from left to right): John Adams from the Province of Massachusetts Bay, Roger Sherman from Connecticut Colony, Robert R. Livingston from the Province of New York, Thomas Jefferson from the Colony of Virginia, and Benjamin Franklin (seated) from the Province of Pennsylvania.

In the foreground on the left is Samuel Adams from the Province of Massachusetts Bay, and Robert Morris (wearing white) from the Province of Pennsylvania. Above Samuel Adams is Robert Treat Paine from the Province of Massachusetts Bay, and above him is Benjamin Rush from the Province of Pennsylvania. Immediately to the left of Samuel Adams is Samuel Chase from the Province of Maryland, and above Robert Morris (wearing dark) is Benjamin Harrison from the Colony of Virginia.

== Engraving by Edward Savage ==
An engraving based on the painting was made by Edward Savage in 1801, who finished the unpainted portraits.

== See also ==
- Declaration of Independence an 1818 portrait by John Trumbull
- Founding Fathers of the United States
