= Market Museum (Boston) =

Former museum in Boston, Massachusetts

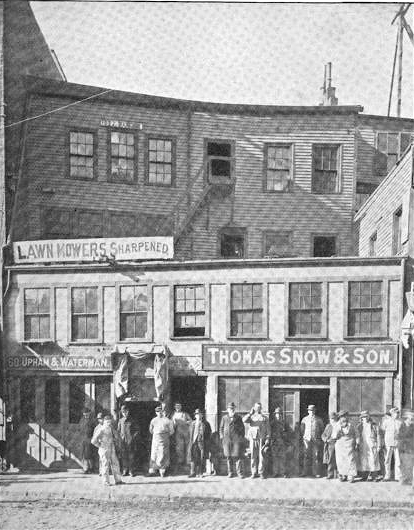
Former site of the Market Museum, shown in 1895

The Market Museum (1804-1822) of Boston, Massachusetts, was located in Market Square, adjacent to Faneuil Hall. Phillip Woods directed the enterprise. Also called the Boston Museum, it featured displays of "wax figures, pictures, natural and fanciful curiosities -- such as have not been exhibited in this town before" and was "opened for the inspection of the public every day, from 9 o'clock in the morning until 9 in the evening."

Among the highlights advertised: "the Magical Deotric, which represents a variety of elegant views of the most populous cities on the globe;" "Nairne's new patent electrical machine;" "performance of the phantasmagoria, or German ghosts;" "the great elephant Horatio;" "grand cosmorama of Montreal & its environs;" "live alligator;" "a young whale, just brought in from sea;" "live bear;" 80-foot-long "skin of the sea-elephant;" pictorial "likenesses of generals Washington and Green;" "wax figures." (Note: "Wax figures, viz. -- Tupia, prince of Atooi; Wynee, a female Codiac princess, native of Owyhee; ... a chief of Nootka Sound; the 3 abovementioned figures are likenesses of the respective persons, and dressed in the original dresses, worn by them in 1788. The Boston beauty, an excellent likeness of a young lady in this town. A likeness of an ancient musketeer, who was in the service of Charles the 5th -- who has one of the original muskets, then used, and is properly dressed and equipped with bandaliers &c. The beautiful scene of Othello and Desdamona, taken from the Tragedy of Othello. The arms of the United States supported by Liberty and Justice, two wax-figures. Mungo, a black boy, attacked by an alligator, &c. &c.")

1821 advert for the Market Museum

On the premises Woods sometimes sold goods such as "cement" and "electrical machines." He also treated medical problems: "Mr. Woods tenders his services to those ladies or gentlemen who stand in need of medical electricity, and would inform them that he cures the gout, rheumatic complaints, dystentary, toothache, ague, asthma, felon or whitlow, lock-jaw, pally, quincy, ricketts, St. Vitus' Dance, and a variety of other complaints incident to the human body." The museum closed by 1822, when the newly formed New-England Museum acquired its collection. (Note: Woods also experienced some personal drama around this time. In October 1821 he issued a notice in the local newspaper about his wife Martha: "Notice -- Whereas Martha my wife has behaved in a very indecent and unbecoming manner, has incurred many needless and unnecessary expenses which I have been obliged to pay, and has disposed of my property, &c. -- This is to caution all persons from buying, or receiving, any articles of property from her, that belong to me, as they would avoid the penalty of the law; and all persons are forbid trusting her, on my account, as I shall pay no debts thus contracted after this date.")
