= William Doyle (Irish businessman) =

Irish businessman

- Education: Trinity College Dublin
- Occupation: Businessman
- Title: Chief Executive of Newbridge Silverware
- Term: 1993–present
- Predecessor: Dominic Doyle
- Spouse: Monica

William Doyle is an Irish businessman and current chief executive of Newbridge Silverware, a cutlery and giftware manufacturer based in Newbridge, County Kildare.

== Early life and education ==
Doyle grew up in County Kildare and was educated at Newbridge College. He studied Business Studies and Economics at Trinity College Dublin.

== Career ==
William Doyle took over as CEO of Newbridge Silverware from his father, Dominic Doyle, in 1993 when he died. The company had a turnover of €27 million in 2007.

Doyle was nominated for the 2005 Ernst & Young Entrepreneur of the Year award in the Industry category.
