= Robert Edge Pine =

English painter (1730–1788)

Robert Edge Pine (1730 – 18 November 1788) was an English painter who specialised in portrait painting and history painting. He was the son of the engraver and designer John Pine, and the uncle of the watercolourist John Robert Cozens. Pine spent the last four years of his life in the United States, living in Philadelphia.

== Career ==
He painted portraits, including of George II, David Garrick (in the National Portrait Gallery, London), the 1st Duke of Northumberland, a series of scenes from Shakespeare, some of which afterward appeared in Boydell's Shakespeare, and historical compositions, including Lord Rodney Aboard the Formidable, which is now in the Town Hall of Kingston, Jamaica.

Pine was active in the society of artists and learned gentlemen in London, in particular the circle of the anatomist, William Hunter. Pine painted Hunter, Hunter's sister, Dorothy Baillie, and Baillie's husband, Prof. Rev. James Baillie. Pine also painted a vibrant portrait of Captain William Baillie.

Pine held radical political opinions; he painted John Wilkes, MP, during his imprisonment and political exile, and his unfashionable views likely led to his exclusion from the founding group of the Royal Academy of Art in 1768. Nevertheless, Pine did exhibit at the Royal Academy in 1772, 1780, and 1784. Pine's views led him to friendships with others in England sympathetic to the cause of the American Revolution, such as the merchant, Samuel Vaughan, a friend of Benjamin Franklin, both of whom he painted.

Around 1784, Pine travelled to America, taking with him an exhibition of a series of paintings depicting scenes and characters from William Shakespeare's plays and settled in Philadelphia, where his time was completely taken up with portraiture. Among his sitters were General Gates, Charles Carroll, Robert Morris, Walter Stewart, George Read, Thomas Stone, Mrs. Reid (Metropolitan Museum, New York), George Washington (1785), Martha Washington, and other members of the Washington family. The portrait of Washington was engraved for Irving's Life of Washington, but it is weak in characterization. An historically interesting canvas Congress Voting Independence, now in the Historical Society, Philadelphia, was begun by Pine and finished by Edward Savage. In 1786, Pine was elected a member of the American Philosophical Society. After Pine's death many of his pictures were collected in the Columbian Museum in Boston.

It is thought that Pine gave lessons to Prince Demah in London.

== Gallery ==
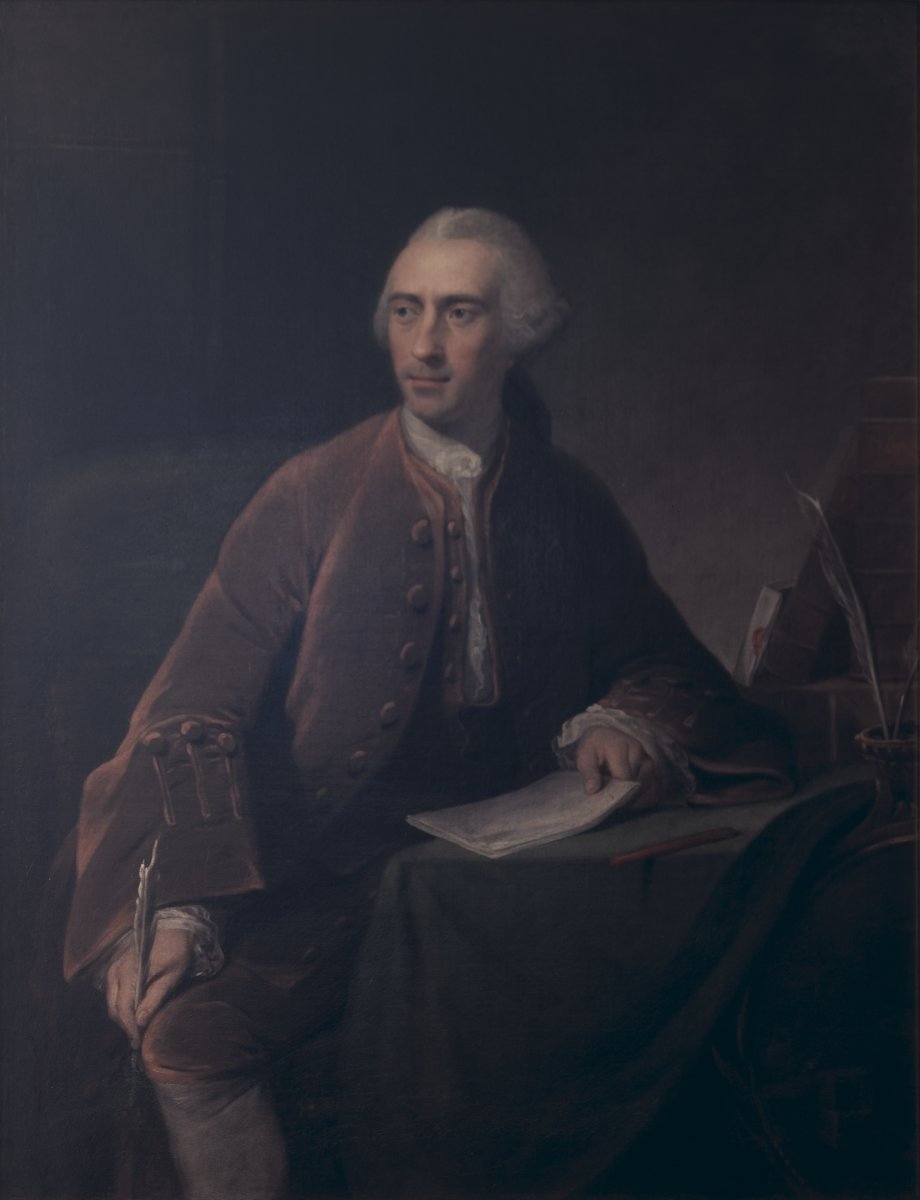
Samuel Vaughan (1760)

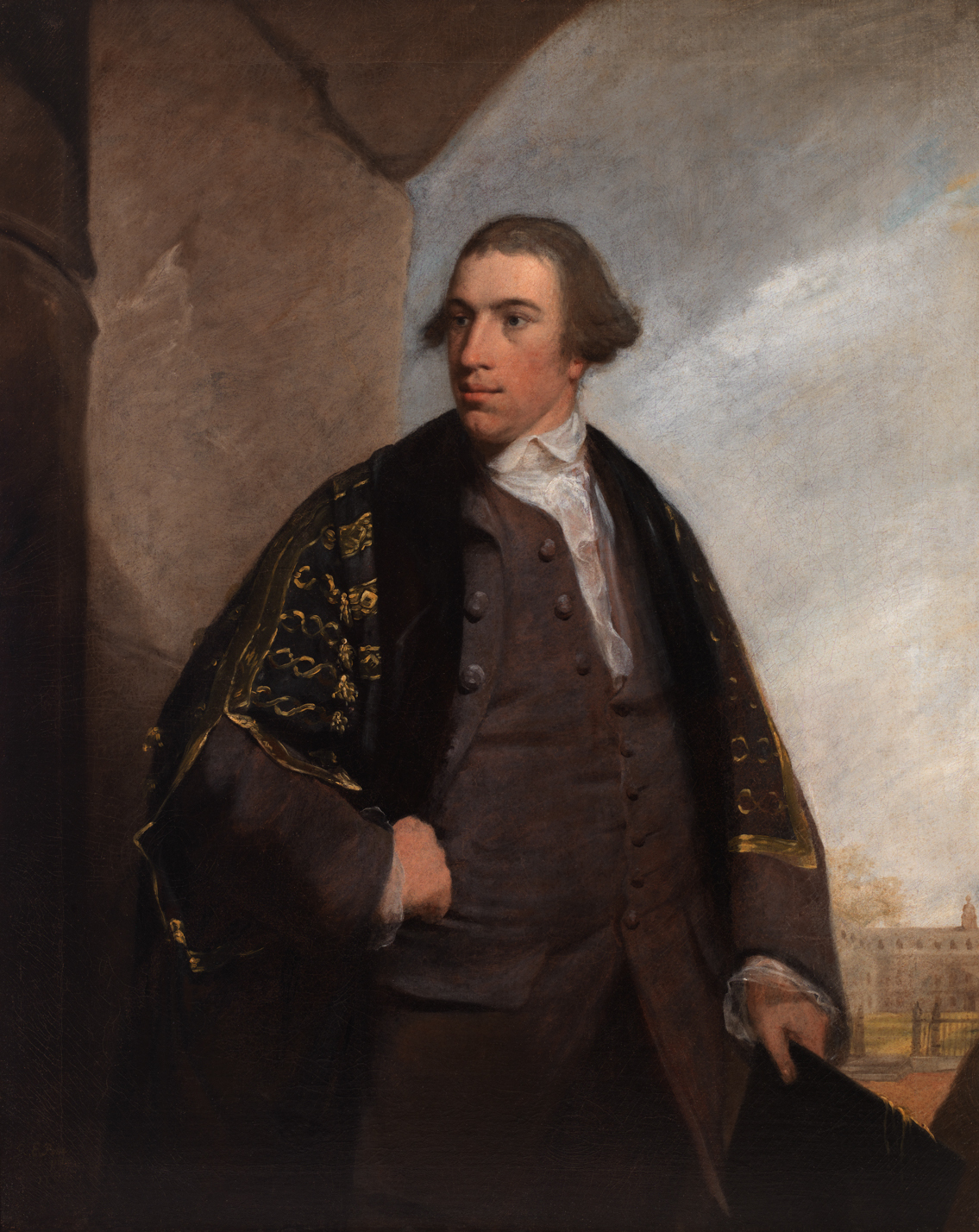
Ralph Wormeley (1763)

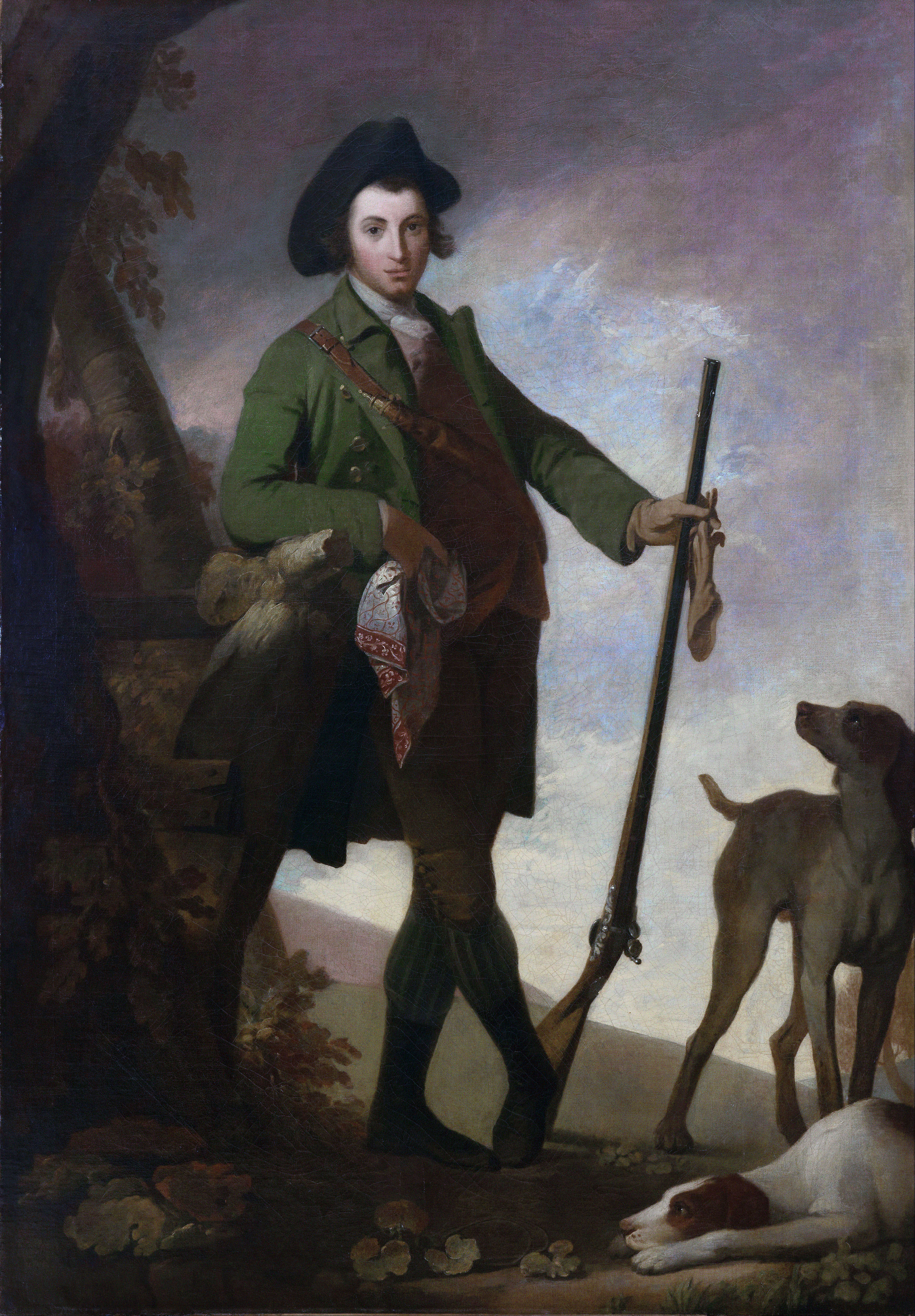
The Young Sportsman (1766)

Sir John Taylor, 1st Baronet FRS, c. 1770s

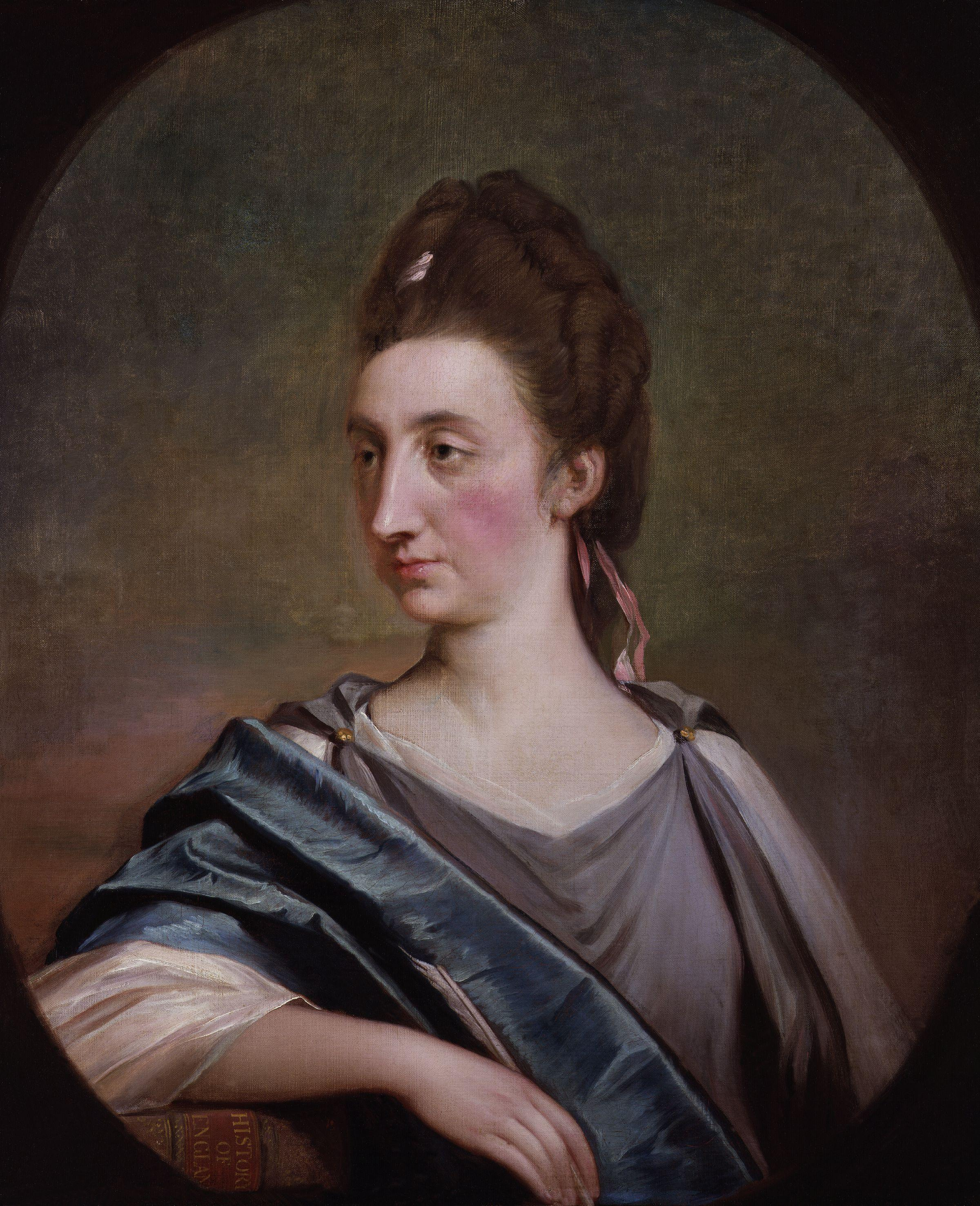
Catharine Macaulay (c. 1774)

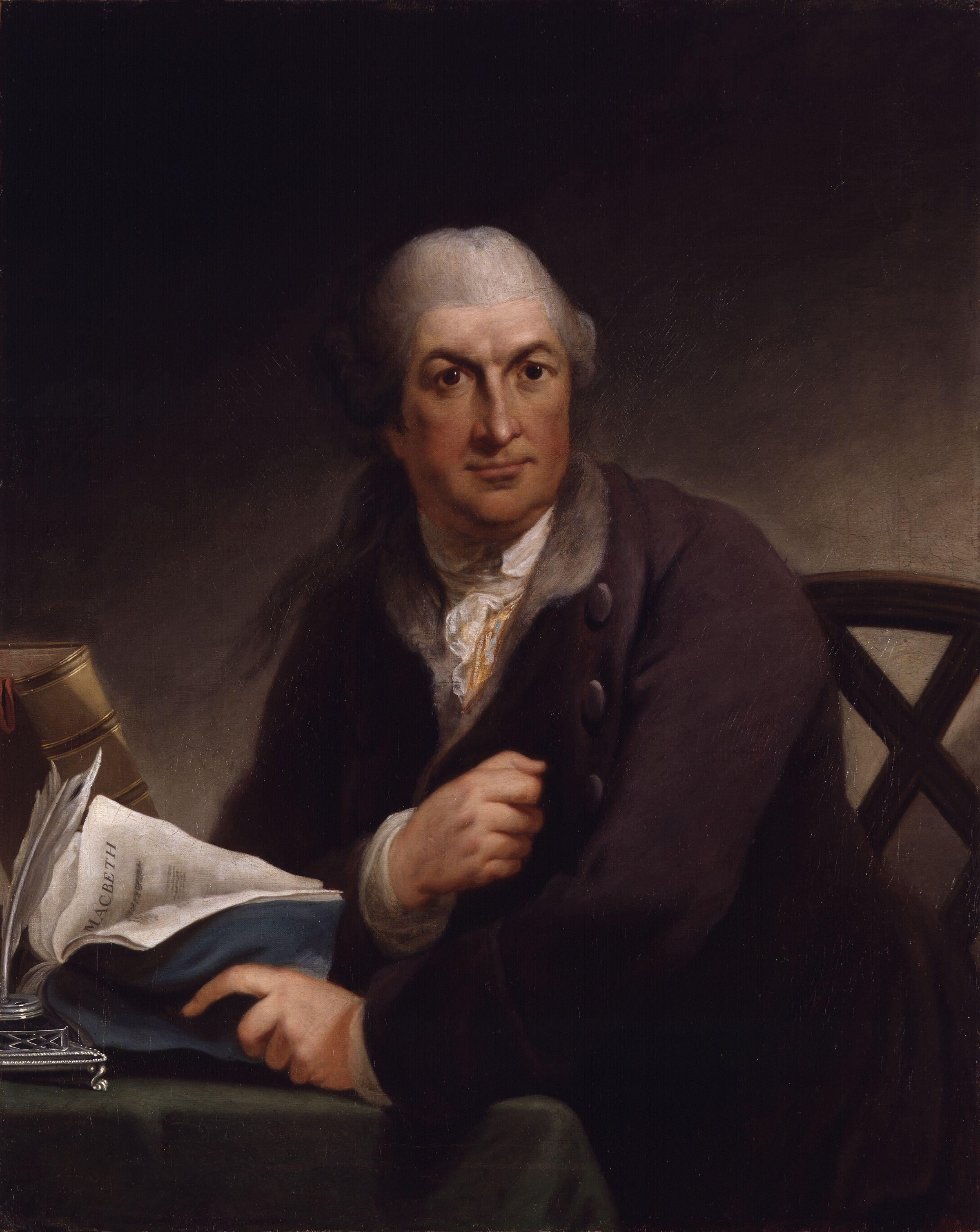
David Garrick (c. 1775)

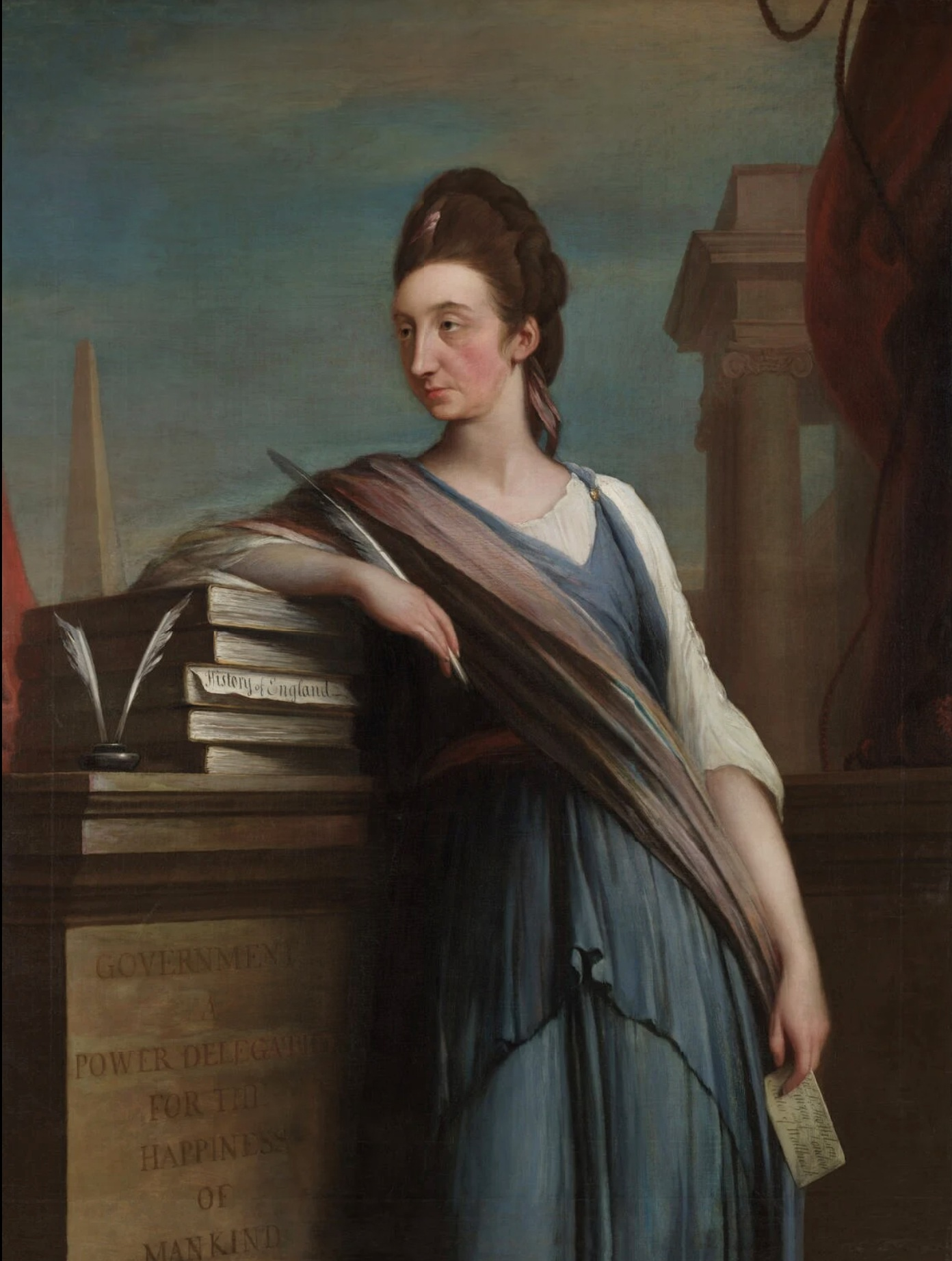
Catharine Macaulay (c. 1775)

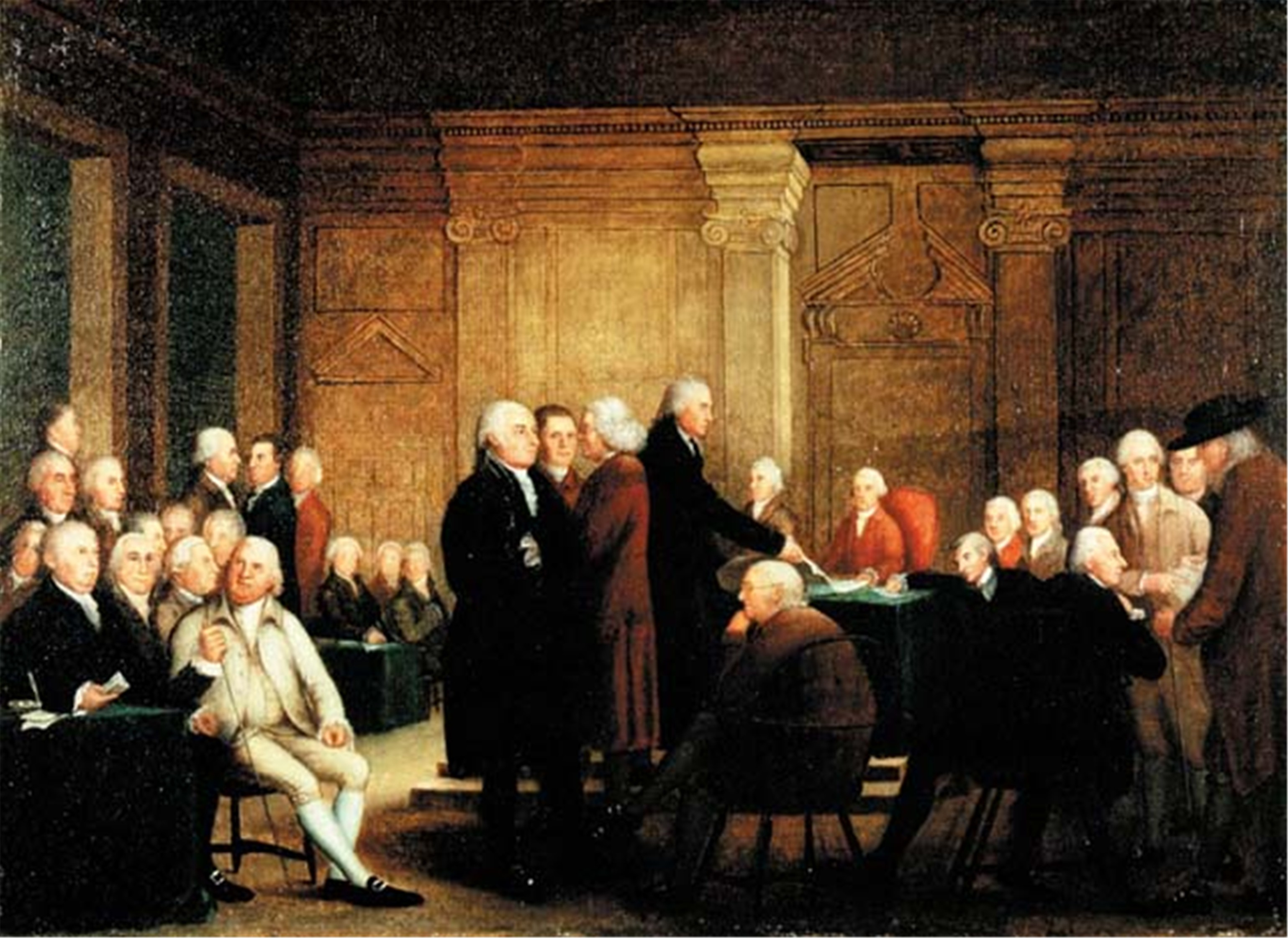
Congress Voting Independence (1784–1788)

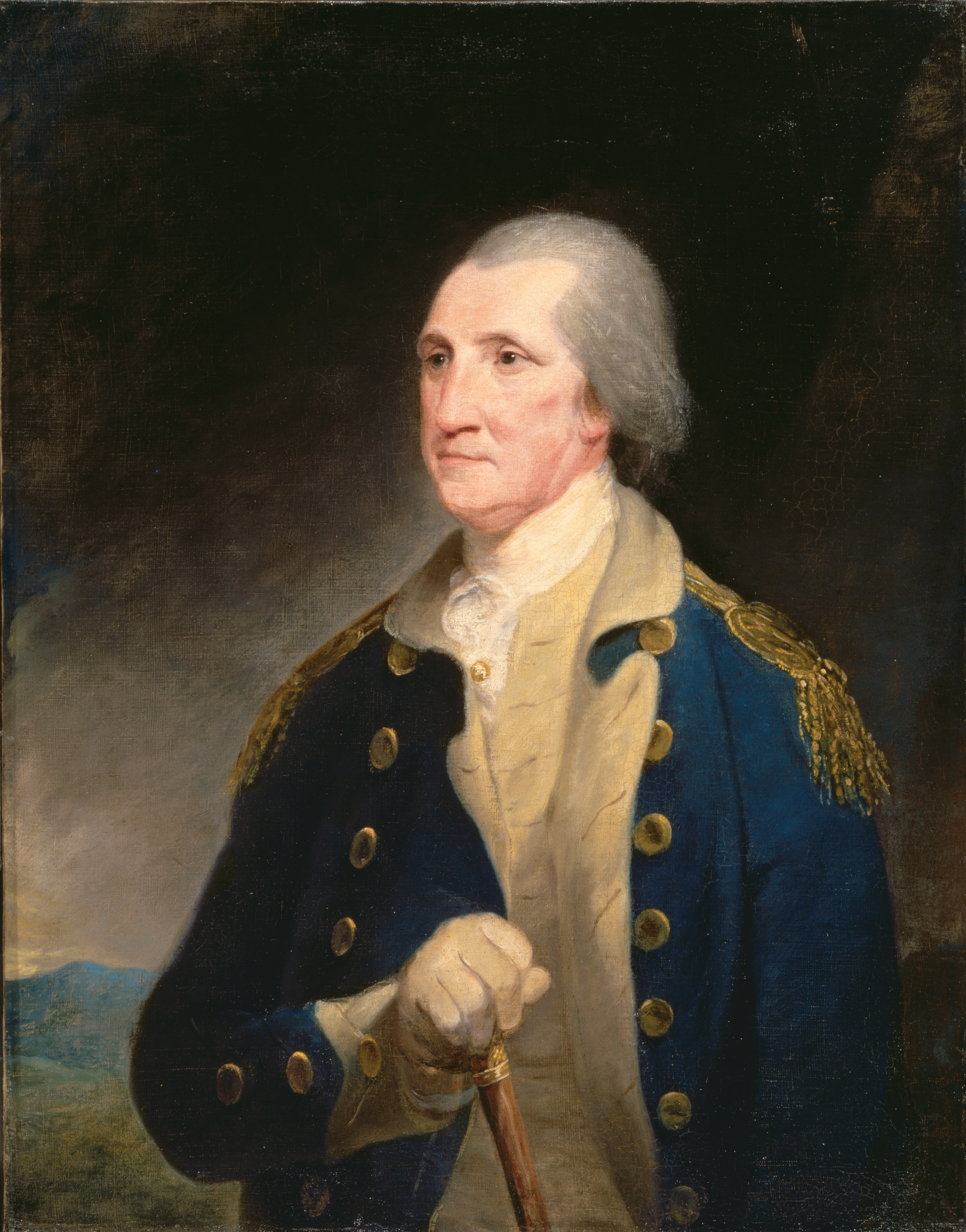
Portrait of George Washington (1785)

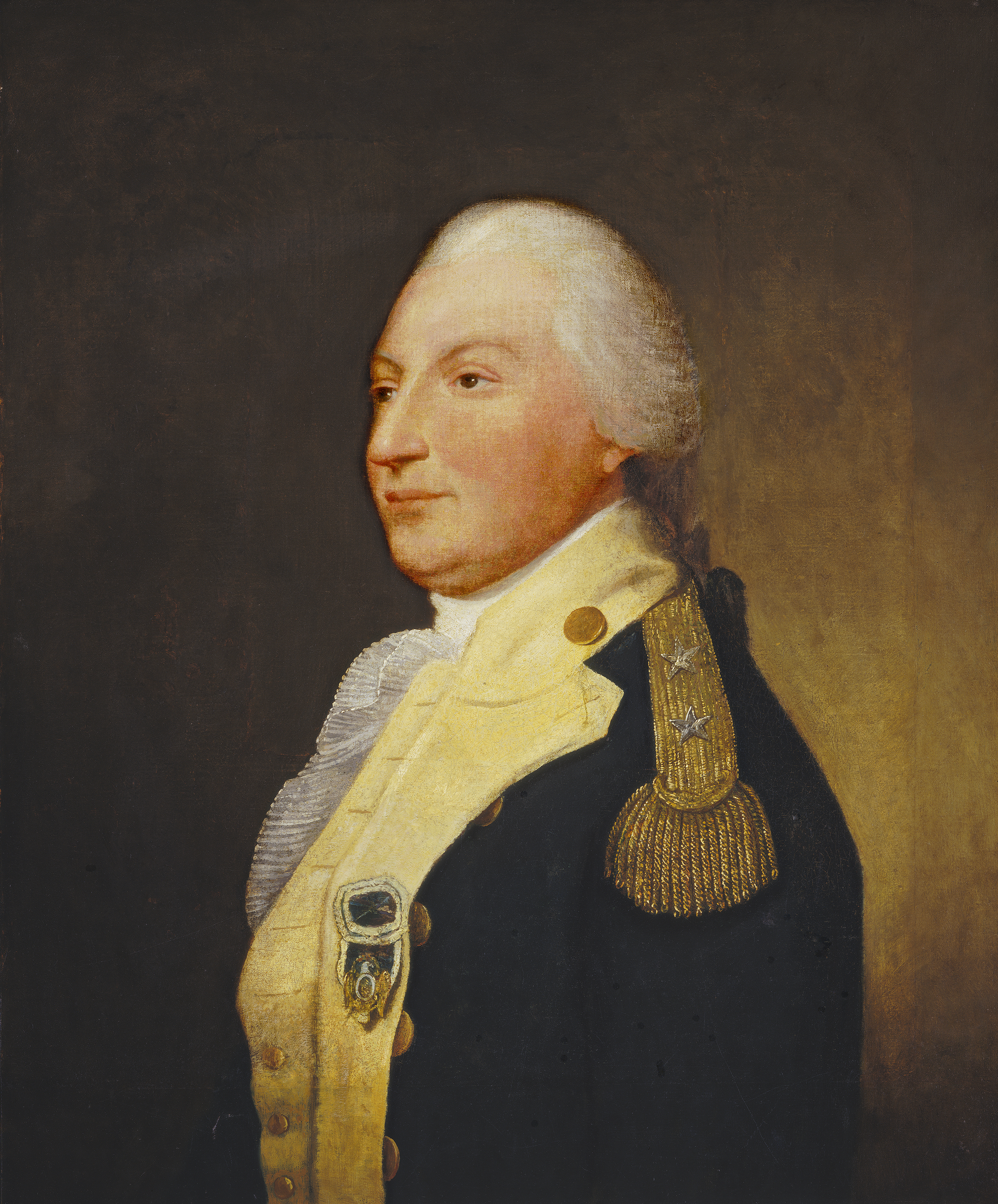
General William Smallwood (c. 1785–1788)

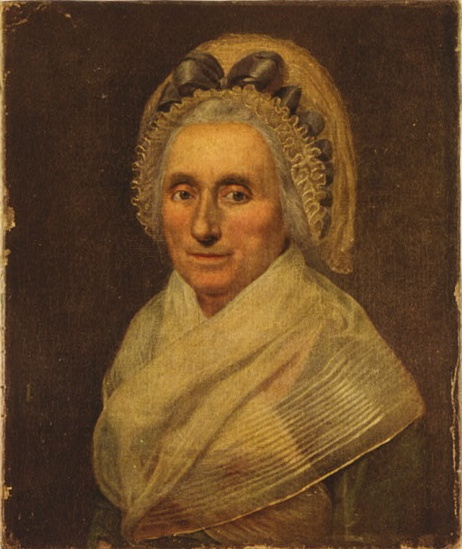
Mary Ball Washington (1786)

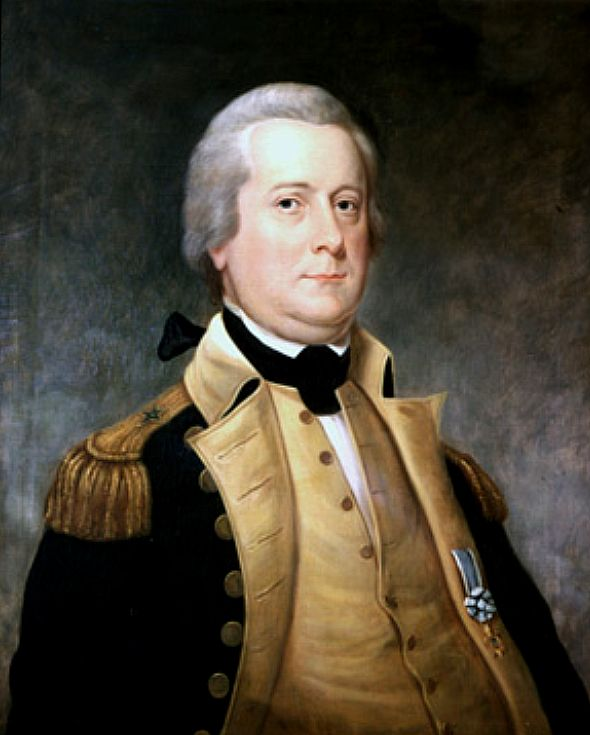
William Irvine (c. 1788)

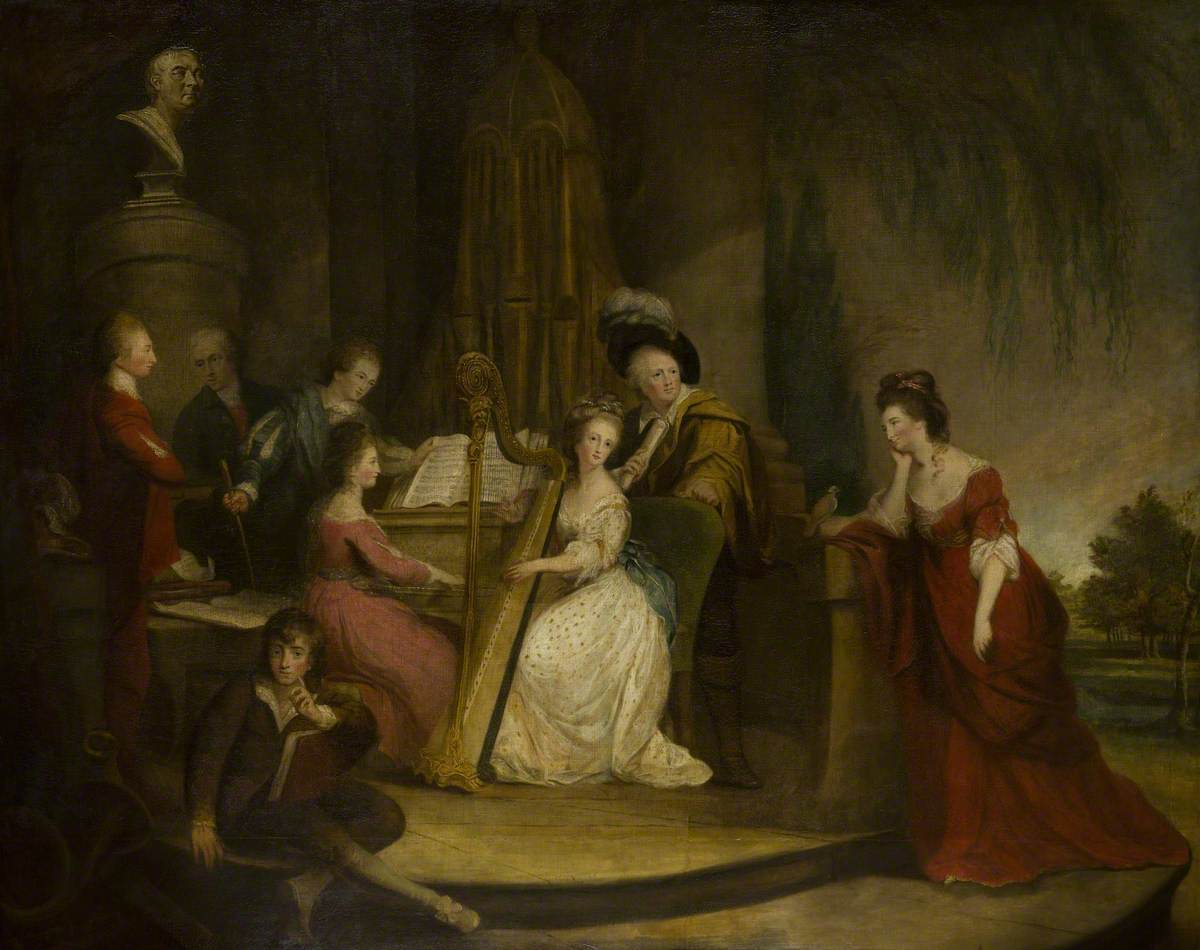
Sir Henry Bridgeman and His Family Playing Music (Date unknown)

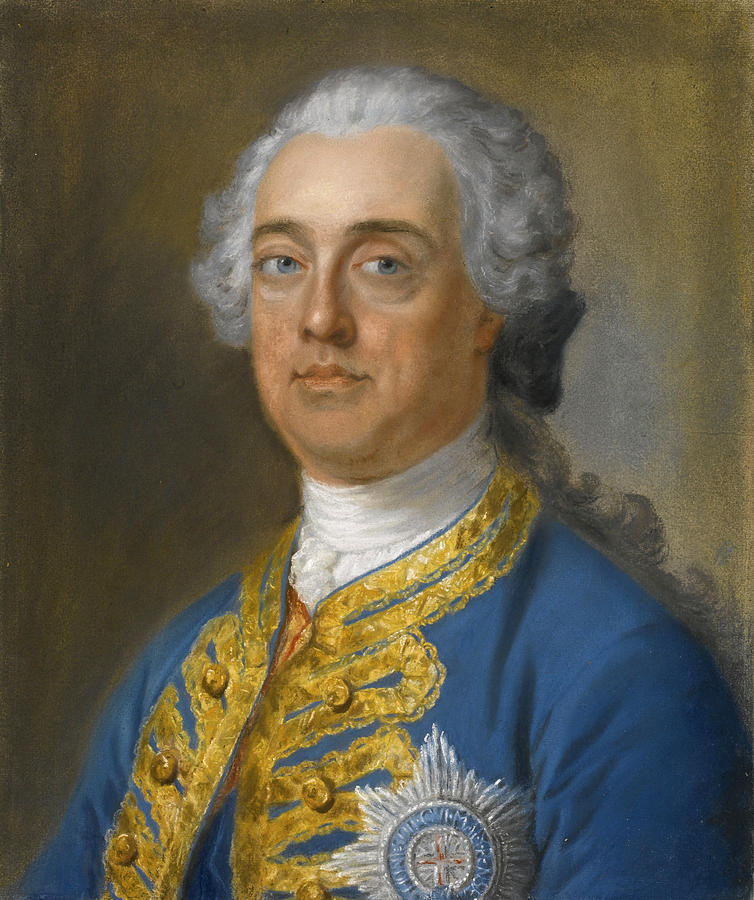
Portrait of William Capell, 3rd Earl of Essex (Date unknown)

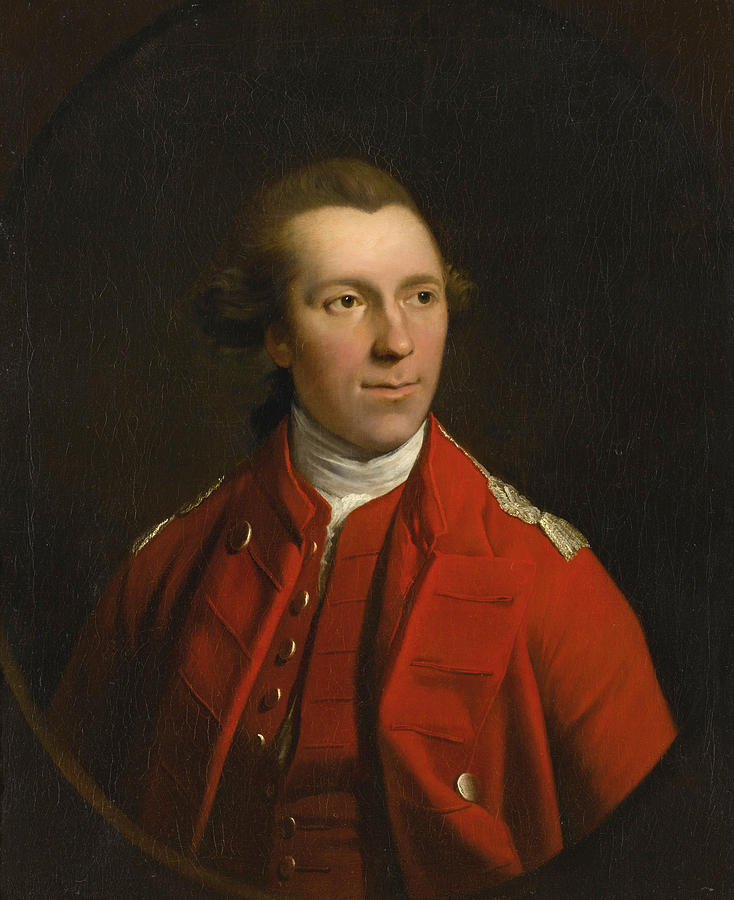
Portrait of a British Officer (Date unknown)

== Sources ==
- Hart, "Congress Voting Independence", Pennsylvania Magazine of History and Biography 29 (1905): 1-14.
