= William M. S. Doyle =

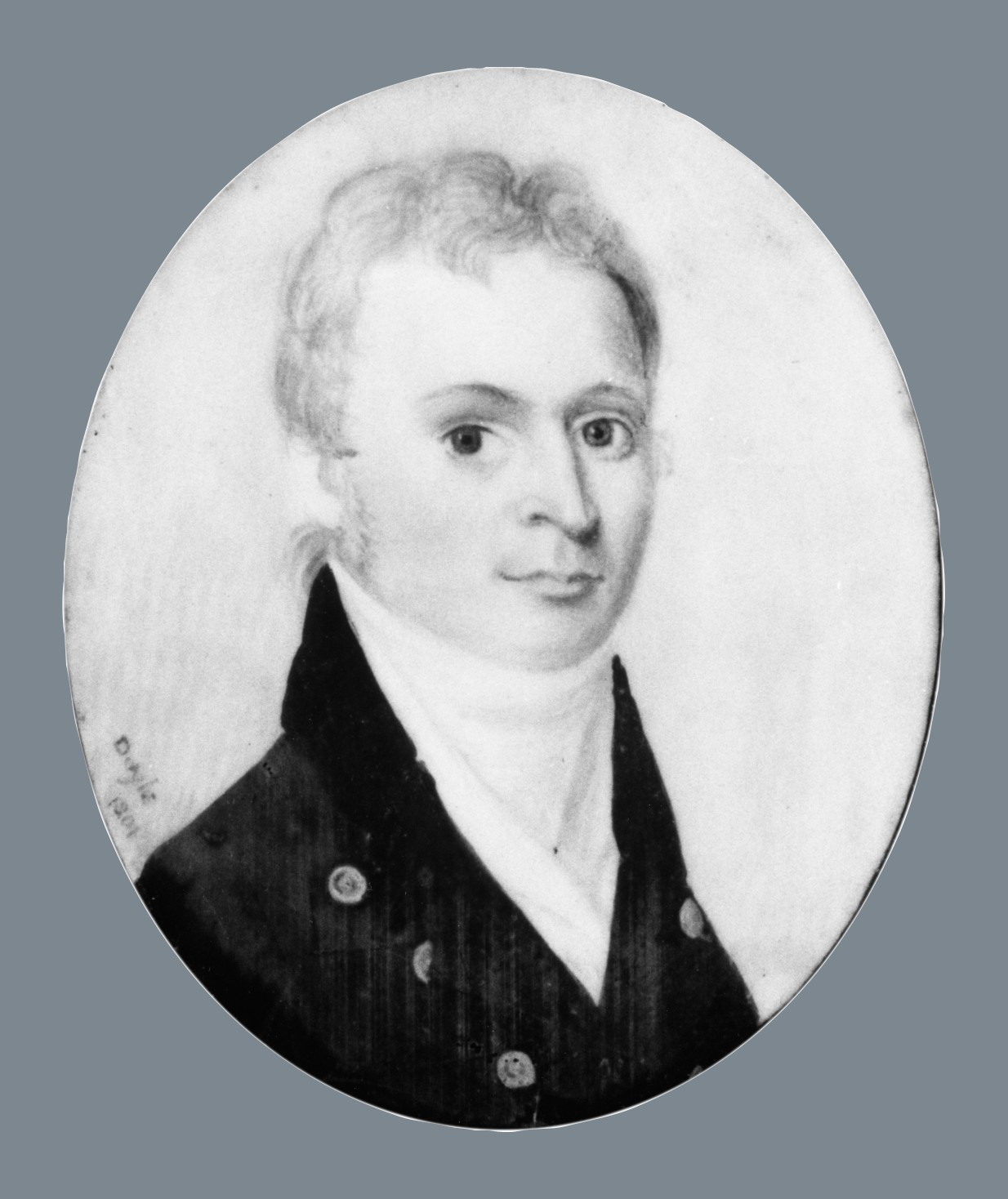
Self Portrait of the Artist (1801)

William Massey Stroud Doyle (1769–1828) was a portrait painter and museum proprietor in Boston, Massachusetts.

== Portraits ==
He oversaw the Columbian Museum on Tremont Street in the early 19th century.

As an artist, Doyle created portraits of:

- John Adams
- Elijah Bigelow
- Jean-Louis Lefebvre de Cheverus
- Anna Brewster Cleland, 1822
- Thomas Ivers Cleland, 1815
- Elijah Corey
- Lydia Gendell Dawes
- Nicolas Michel Faucon
- Samuel Foster
- Gottlieb Graupner, 1807
- Clarendon Harris
- John Hicks, 1806
- Benjamin Hurd Jr.
- John Jones, c. 1815
- John May
- James Melledge, 1811
- William Porter
- Samuel Stockwell and Catherine Stockwell
- Caleb Strong
- James Sullivan
- Isaiah Thomas, 1805
- Rufus Webb

According to historian Charlotte Moore, Doyle's daughter, Margaret Byron Doyle, "also worked as an artist."

== Gallery ==
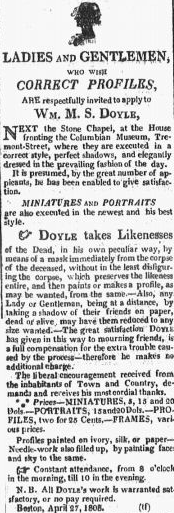
Advertisement for Wm. M.S. Doyle, 1808

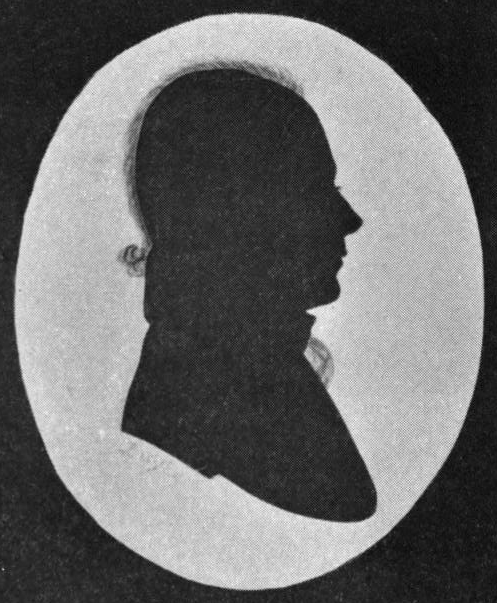
Silhouette portrait of Catholic priest John Cheverus, of the Holy Cross Church, Boston, 19th century

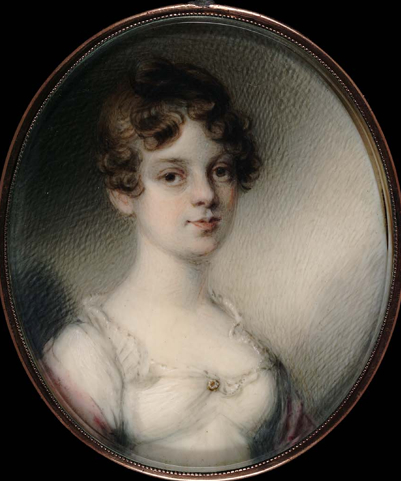
Portrait of a woman, 1810 (Smithsonian)

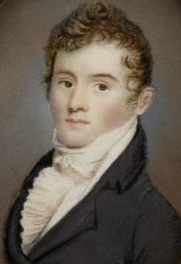
Portrait of Samuel Stockwell, 1810 (Museum of Fine Arts, Boston)

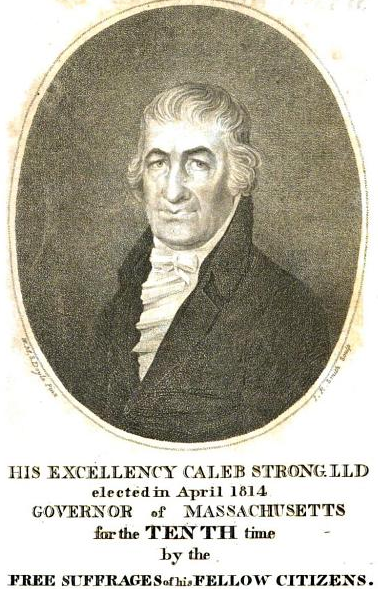
Portrait of Massachusetts governor Caleb Strong, 1814; drawn by Doyle, engraved by I.R. Smith

== See also ==
- Columbian Museum, Boston (1795–1825)
