= List of libraries in 18th-century Massachusetts =

This is a list of libraries in 18th-century Massachusetts, North America. It includes subscription, rental, medical, church, and academic libraries. In general, it excludes book collections of private individuals.

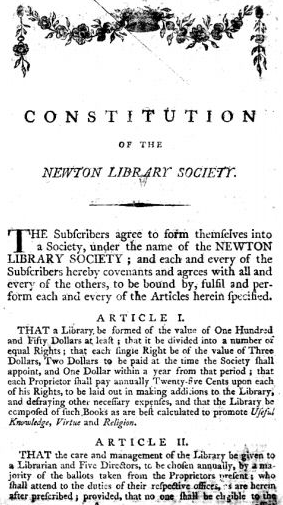
Constitution, Newton Library Society, 1799

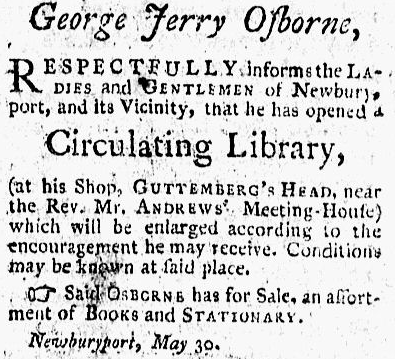
Advertisement for Osborne's circulating library, Newburyport, 1792

There should be a social or circulating library in every town. Less money than a man spends on an election, or training day for punch or grog, would entitle him a reader or proprietor. ... In rainy weather, in winter, or holidays, in the intervals of rest, or during sickness, books will afford treasures and consolations which blockheads know not of. ... They raise men from being savages and brutes. In a word, no town should be destitute of a library.

— The Minerva (Dedham, Massachusetts), June 14, 1798

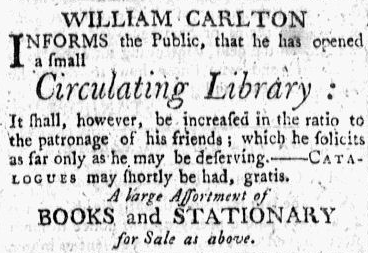
Advertisement for Carlton's circulating library, Salem, 1793

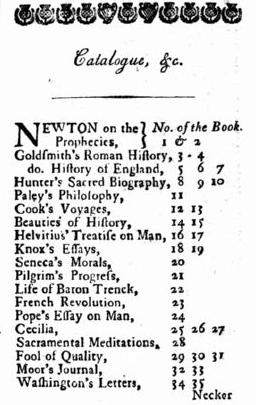
Catalogue, Wareham Social Library, 1798

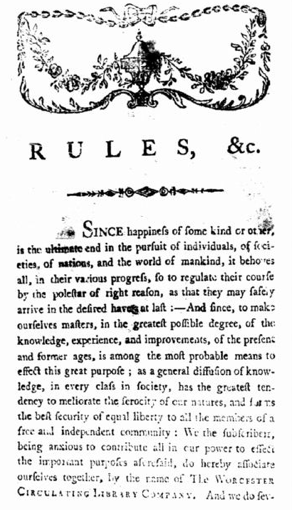
Rules, Worcester Circulating Library Co., 1793

Boston

- American Academy of Arts and Sciences (est. 1780)
- W.P. & L. Blake's Circulating Library, Boston
- Boston Library Society (est.1792)
- Christ Church
- Benjamin Guild's circulating library, Boston
- King's Chapel
- William Martin's Circulating Library, Boston
- Massachusetts Historical Library, Massachusetts Historical Society, Boston
- Massachusetts Medical Society
- John Mein's Circulating Library, Boston
- New England Library, collected by Thomas Prince
- William Pelham's circulating library
- Town Library, in the Town-House, King St.

Boylston, Massachusetts

- Social Library, Boylston Center (est.1792)

Bridgewater, Massachusetts

- Library in the East Precinct of Bridgewater

Cambridge, Massachusetts

- Harvard College Library

Concord, Massachusetts

- Charitable Library Society, Concord (est.1795)

Dorchester, Massachusetts

- Dorchester Library

Douglas, Massachusetts

- Douglas Social Library Association (est.1799)

Falmouth, Massachusetts

- First Congregational Church Library, Falmouth

Franklin, Massachusetts

- Franklin Library (est.1786)

Groton, Massachusetts

- Groton First Parish Library (est.1793)

Haverhill, Massachusetts

- Haverhill Library

Hingham, Massachusetts

- First Social Library, Hingham Centre (est.1771)

Lancaster, Massachusetts

- Lancaster Library (est.1790)

Leicester, Massachusetts

- Leicester Social Library Company (est.1793)

Leominster, Massachusetts

- Social Library, Leominster (est.1763)

Lincoln, Massachusetts

- Lincoln Social Library (est.1798)

Lunenburg, Massachusetts

- Lunenburg Social Library (est.1792)

Marlborough, Massachusetts

- Social Library, Marlborough

Medfield, Massachusetts

- Medfield Social Library (est.1786)

Middleton, Massachusetts

- Social library, Middleton (est.1772)

Newburyport, Massachusetts

- First Social Library, Newburyport
- Newburyport Book-Store circulating library
- Newburyport Library
- George Jerry Osborne's circulating library, "at his shop, Guttemberg's Head" Newburyport

Newton, Massachusetts

- Newton Library Society

Oxford, Massachusetts

- Social Library, Oxford

Pittsfield, Massachusetts

- Pittsfield Library Society

Rowe, Massachusetts

- Rowe Social Library (est.1797)

Royalston, Massachusetts

- Library Company of Royalston (est.1778)

Salem, Massachusetts

- William Carlton's circulating library, Salem
- John Dabney's circulating library, Salem
- Philosophical Library, Salem (est.1781)
- Social Library, Salem (est.1760)

Springfield, Massachusetts

- Springfield Library Company

Wareham, Massachusetts

- Wareham Social Library

Watertown, Massachusetts

- Union Library Society (est.1779)

Westford, Massachusetts

- Social library, Westford (est.1797)

Williamstown, Massachusetts

- Williams College Library

Worcester, Massachusetts

- Worcester Circulating Library Company
- Worcester District Medical Library (est.1798)

== See also ==
- Books in the United States
- Culture of Massachusetts
- List of booksellers in Boston
- List of libraries in 19th-century Boston, Massachusetts
- List of public libraries in Massachusetts
- List of libraries in the United States
- Literature of New England
