= List of libraries in 19th-century Boston =

This list includes libraries located in Boston, Massachusetts, active in the 19th century. Included are reading-rooms, circulating libraries, subscription libraries, public libraries, academic libraries, medical libraries, children's libraries, church libraries, and government libraries.

== List of libraries ==
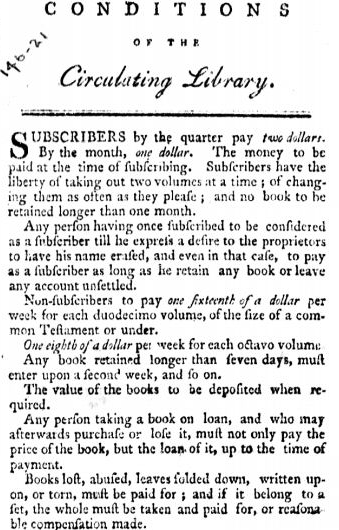
Conditions of Blakes' circulating library, no.1 Cornhill, 1800

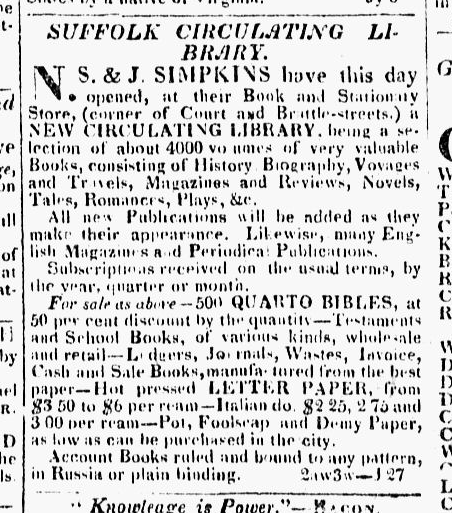
Ad for Suffolk Circulating Library, corner Brattle and Court St., 1822

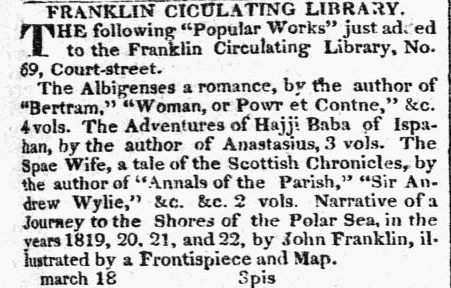
Ad for Franklin Circulating Library, Court St., 1824

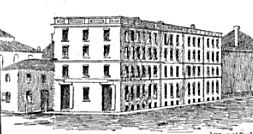
Mercantile Library Association, Merchants Hall, corner Congress and Water St., 1820s-1830s

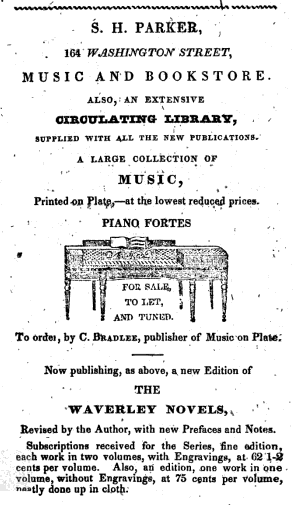
Ad for S.H. Parker's circulating library, Washington St., 1832

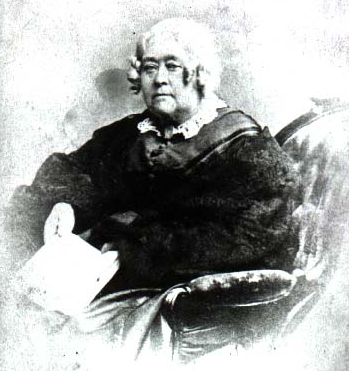
Portrait of Elizabeth Peabody, proprietor of foreign library, West St., 19th century

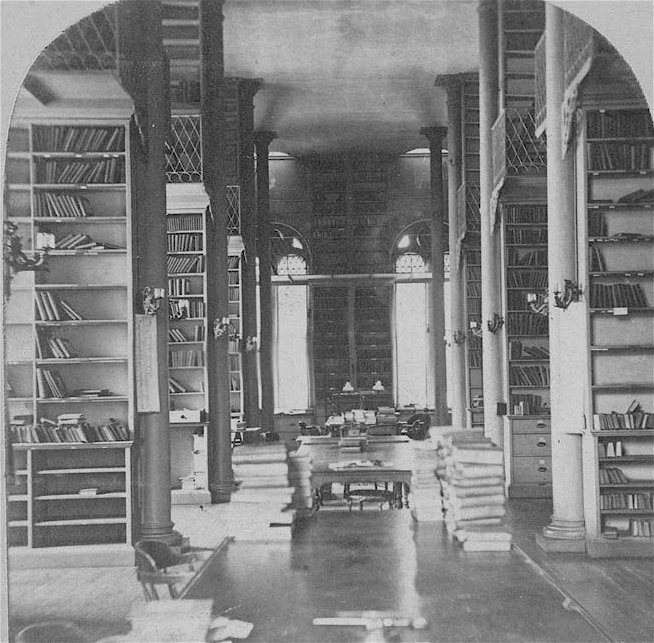
Boston Public Library, Boylston St., mid-19th century

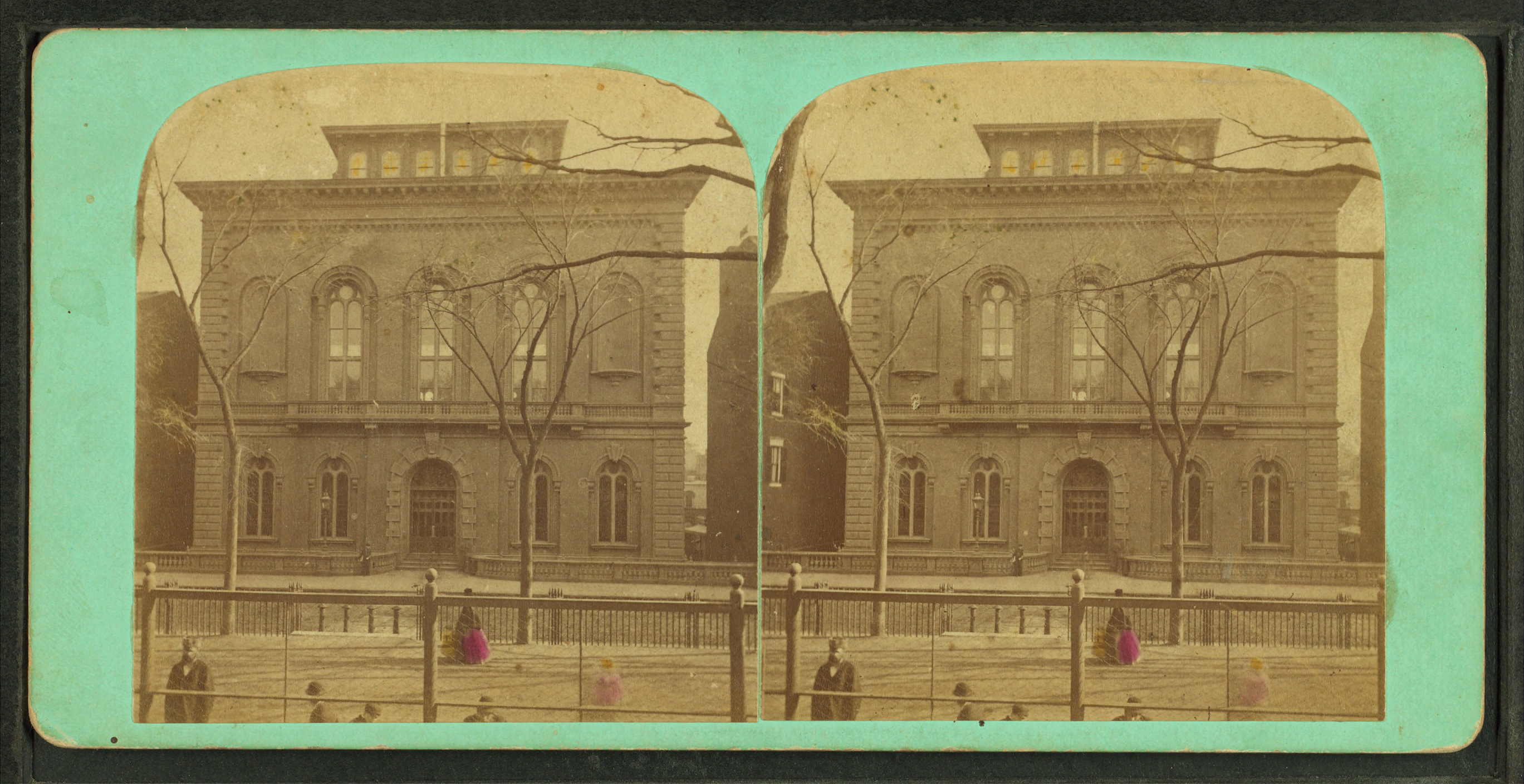
Boston Public Library, Boylston St., mid-19th century

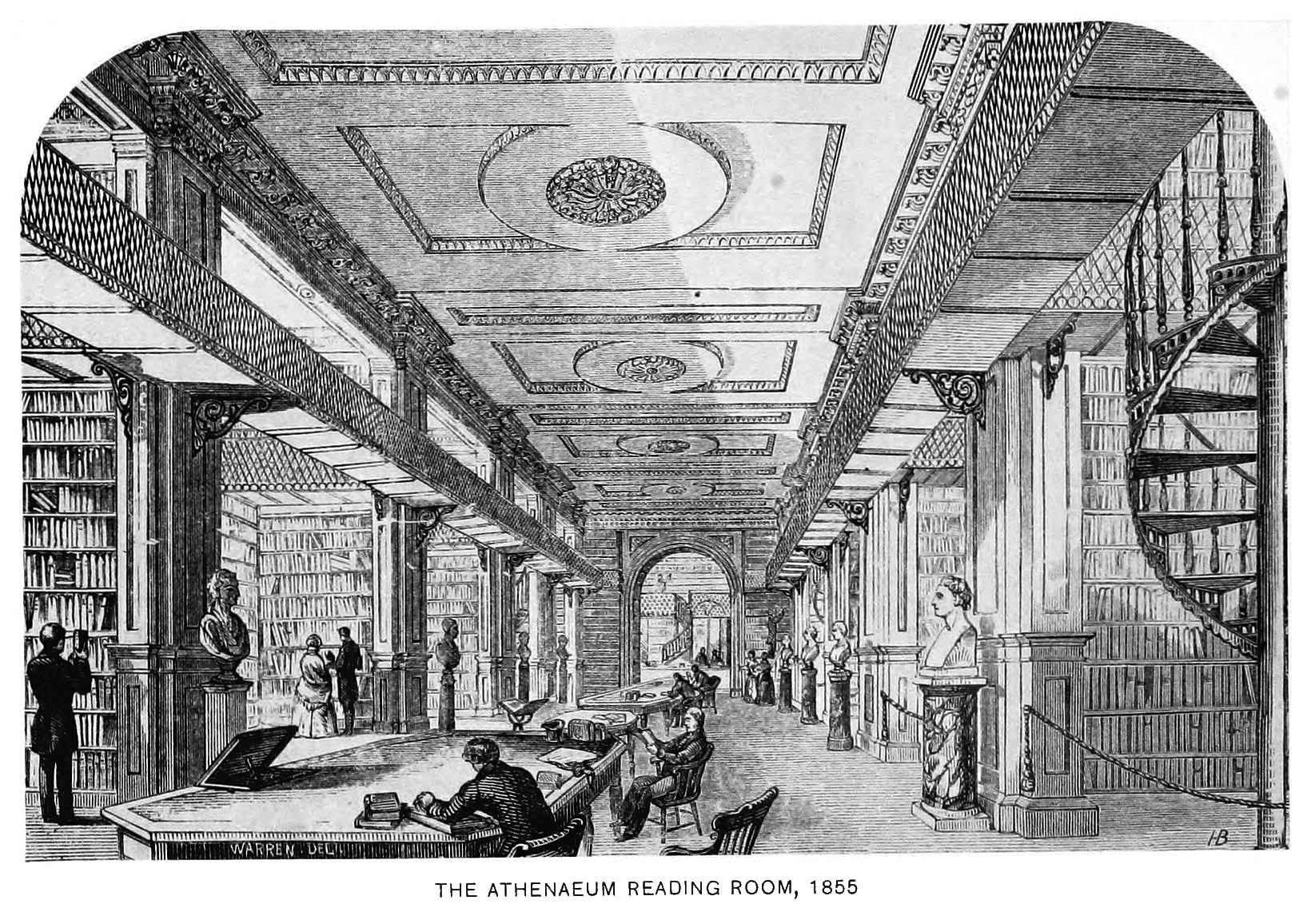
Boston Athenaeum, Beacon St., 1850s

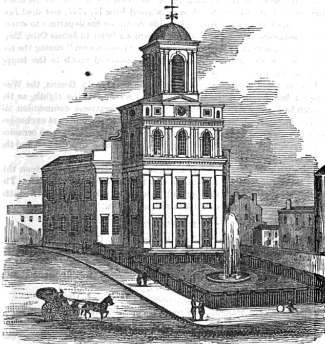
West Church, Lynde St., West End, mid-19th century

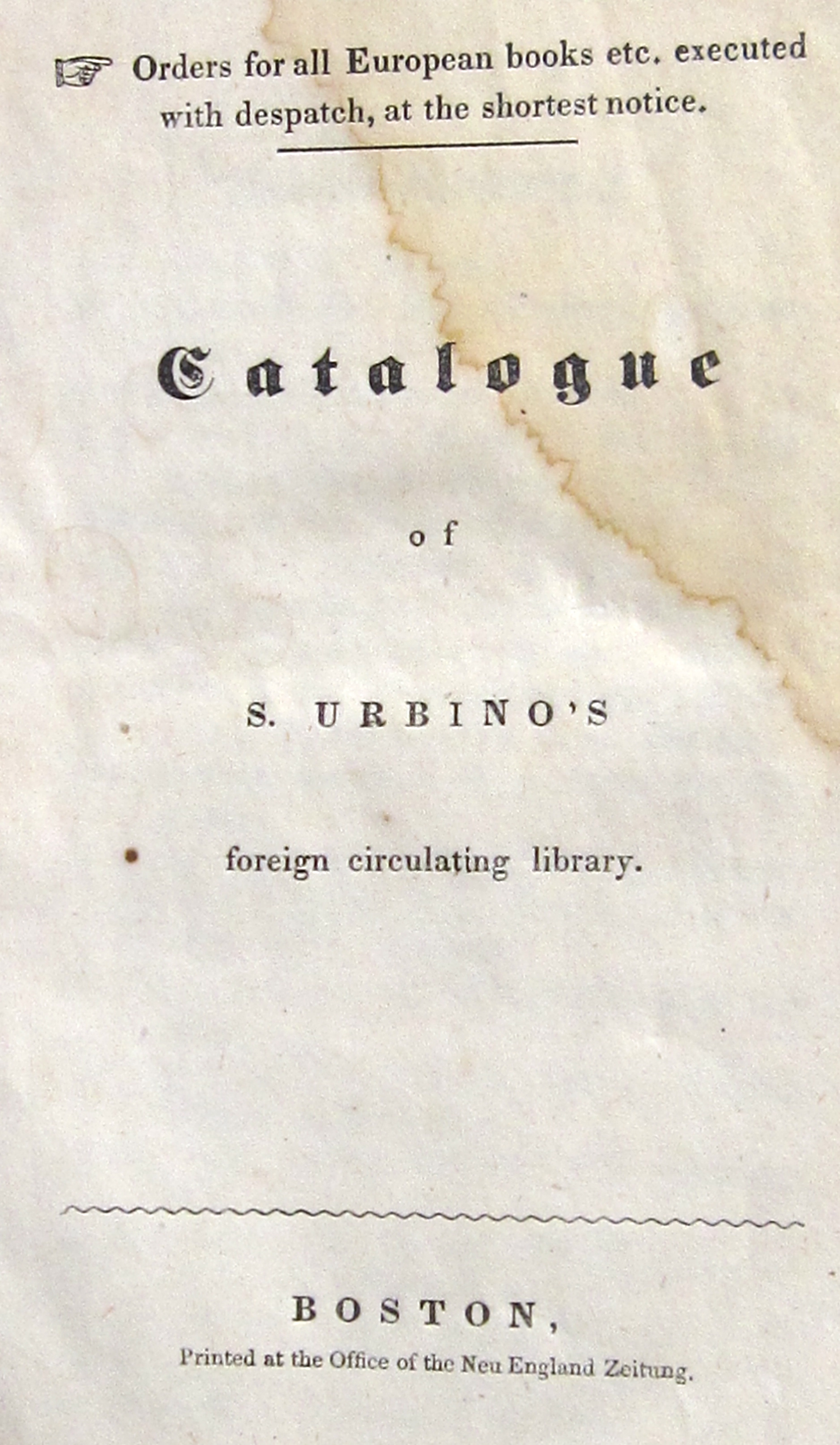
Catalogue of S. Urbino's foreign circulating library, 19th century (American Antiquarian Society)

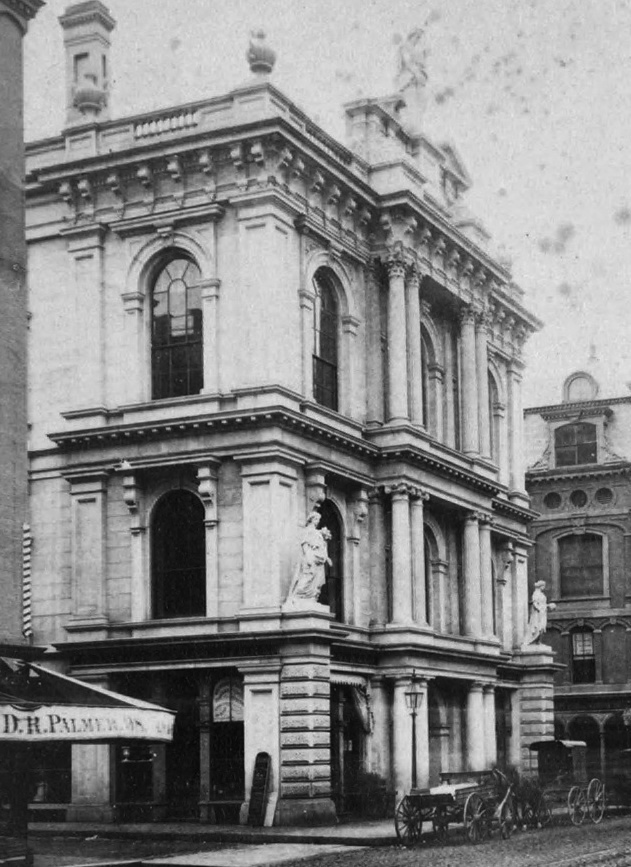
Massachusetts Horticultural Society, Horticultural Hall, Tremont St., mid-19th century

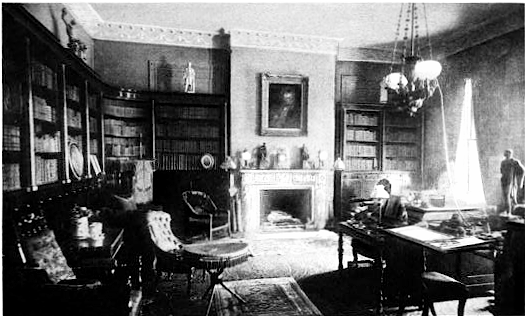
Library in house of George Ticknor and his daughter Anna Ticknor, Park St., Boston, ca.1890s

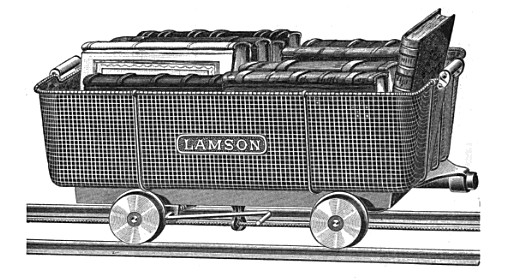
"Book railway" used in Boston Public Library, 1895. Made by Lamson Consolidated Store Service Company, of Boston

A

- Adjutant-General's Library
- Almshouse Library
- American Academy of Arts and Sciences Library
- American Baptist Union Library
- American Board of Commissioners for Foreign Missions Library, Mission House, Pemberton Square
- American Institute of Instruction Library
- American Peace Society Library
- American Statistical Association Library
- American Unitarian Association
- Mary Ashley, no.124 Charles St.
- Asylum and Farm School Library

B

- Backup's Circulating Library
- Luke Baker's circulating library, no.69 Court St.
- Berkeley Circulating Library
- Bigelow School Library
- Bixby's Circulating Library; L.W. Bixby, Washington St.
- William Pinson Blake and Lemuel Blake, circulating library at the Boston Book-Store, no.1, Cornhill
- Board of Trade Library
- Boston and Albany Railroad Library (est.1868)
- Boston Art Club Library
- Boston Athenaeum
- Boston Circulating Library, no.3 School St.; E. Penniman Jr.; no.5 Cornhill-Square
- Boston City Hospital Library
- Boston College Library
- Boston Library Society
- Boston Lunatic Hospital Library
- Boston Medical Library (1805-1826)
- Boston Medical Library (est. 1875)
- Boston Public Library
- Boston Society for Medical Improvement
- Boston Society of Natural History Library
- Boston Society of the New Jerusalem Church Library
- Boston Theological Library
- Boston Turnverein Library
- Boston University
  - Boston University Library
  - Boston University School of Medicine Library
  - Boston University Theological Library
- Boston Young Men's Christian Union Library, no.20 Boylston
- Bowditch Library
- Bowdoin Literary Association
- Boylston Library
- Brattle Square Church Library
- Broadway Circulating Library
- Bromfield Street Church Library
- Eliza Brown, circulating library
- Bulfinch Place Chapel Library
- Burnham & Bros., no.60 Cornhill; Thomas Burnham, Perry Burnham
- Kezia Butler, no.82 Newbury Street

C

- Campbell's Circulating Library
- Carney Hospital Library
- Carter's Circulating Library
- Callender's Library, School St.; also known as the Shakespeare Library; Charles Callender, H.G. Callender
- Charlestown High School Library
- Christ Church Library
- Christian Unity Library
- Church Home for Orphans Library
- Church of the Advent Library
- City Point Circulating Library
- Clarendon Library, Clarendon St.
- W.B. Clarke's circulating library
- Columbian Circulating Library, no.43 Cornhill
- Columbian Social Library (est.1813), Boylston Hall
- Comer's Commercial College
- Congregational Library & Archives, corner of Beacon and Somerset
- Consumptives' Home Library

D

- Deaf Mute Library Association
- Democratic reading room, corner Congress St. and Congress Sq.
- Dorchester Athenaeum Library
- Dramatic Fund Association
- J.H. Duclos & Bro., no.57 Warren St.

E

- East Boston Library Association
- Ministerial Library of Eliot Church

F

- Caroline Fanning
- Farrer's Circulating Library
- First Christian Church Library
- First Universalist Church Library
- Frederick Fletcher, no.55 Meridian, East Boston
- Franklin Circulating Library, no.69 Court St.
- Franklin Typographical Society Library

G

- Gate of Heaven Church Library
- Library of the General Court
- General Theological Library (est.1860); no.12 West St.
- Gill's Circulating Library
- Good Samaritan Church Library
- Grand Lodge of Masons Library
- Grant & Brown, no.873 Washington St.
- Guild Library of Church of the Advent

H

- Halliday's Circulating Library, West St.
- Hancock Library, 42 Hancock; A. Boyden
- Handel and Haydn Library
- Harvard Chapel Library
- Harvard Musical Library
- Medical College of Harvard University Library
- C.W. Holbrook's circulating library; no.88 Dover
- Holy Trinity Church Library
- Home for Aged Women Library
- House of Correction Library
- House of Industry Library
- House of Reformation Library

J

- Jamaica Plain Circulating Library
- Joy Street Baptist Church Library

K

- Keating's Circulating Library; no.1027 Washington St.
- King's Chapel Library

L

- Ladies Circulating Library, Washington St.; N. Nutting, proprietor
- Lawrence Association Library
- R.L. Learned's circulating library, Tremont St.
- Lincoln School Library
- Lindsay's Circulating Library; George W. Lindsey, Washington St.
- Liscomb's Circulating Library
- Loring's Circulating Library; Loring's Select Library, Washington St.; A.K. Loring
- A.F. Low's circulating library, Meridian St.
- Lowe's Circulating Library

M

- Marine Board of Underwriters' Library
- Mariners' Exchange reading room, no.1 Lewis
- Mariner's House, North Square
- Thomas Marsh's circulating library, Beach St.
- Massachusetts College of Pharmacy
- Massachusetts Historical Society
- Massachusetts Horticultural Society Library
- Massachusetts Hospital
- Massachusetts New Church Union Library
- Massachusetts School for Idiotic and Feeble-minded Youth
- Massachusetts Society for Promotion of Agriculture
- Massachusetts State Library
- Massachusetts State Prison Library
- Massachusetts Teachers' Association
- Massachusetts Total Abstinence Society Library
- Mayhew and Baker's Juvenile Circulating Library, no.208 Washington St.
- McGrath's Circulating Library
- Mechanic Apprentices Library Association
- J.O. Mendum's circulating library, Tremont St.
- Mercantile Library Association Library
- Merchants Exchange reading room, Merchants Exchange building, State St.; "basement, Old State House"
- Merrill's Circulating Library; C.H. Merrill, no.1575 Washington St.
- Methodist Episcopal Church Library
- Catherine Moore's circulating library, no.436 Washington St.
- Mount Vernon Church Library
- Mount Vernon School for Young Ladies
- Munroe & Francis, juvenile library, no.4 Cornhill
- Musical Society Library

N

- New England Conservatory of Music Library
- New England Female Medical College
- New England Historic Genealogical Society
- New England Hospital Library
- New England Methodist Historical Society
- Norcross School Library
- North End Circulating Library, no.123 Hanover St.; Thomas Hiller Jr.
- Notre Dame Academy Library

O

- Odd Fellows' Library
- Old Colony Chapel Library
- Osgood's Circulating Library

P

- Paine's Circulating Library
- Samuel H. Parker's circulating library
- H.B. Payne & Co.'s circulating library
- Elizabeth Peabody's foreign circulating library, no.13 West St.
- William Pelham's circulating library, no.59 Cornhill
- Penitent Female Refuge Society Library
- F.W. Perkins' circulating library
- Library of Perkins Institution for the Blind
- Pioneer Circulating Library
- Prince Library

Q

- Quinn's Circulating Library

R

- Lydia Reed
- Republican Institution
- Republican Reading Room, Bromfield St.
- E.R. Rich & Son; no.477 West Broadway
- Roxbury Athenaeum Library
- Roxbury High School Library

S

- Sage's Circulating Library; William Sage, no.371 Tremont
- Sailors Home Library
- School of Technology Library
- Second Methodist Church Library
- W.F. & M.H. Shattuck, no.106 Main
- Shawmut Avenue Baptist Church Library
- Shawmut Mission Library
- Social Law Library
- Society to Encourage Studies at Home
- South End Circulating Library
- Mary Sprague's circulating library, no.9 Milk St.
- St. Francis de Sales Church Library
- St. Joseph Circulating Library
- St. Mary's Young Men's Sodality Library
- St. Stephen's Church Library
- State Agricultural Library
- Stoughton Street Church Library
- Suffolk Circulating Library; corner of Court and Brattle St.; N.S. Simpkins, J. Simpkins
- Sumner library, no.6 Winthrop block, East Boston

T

- Teuthorn's Circulating Library; Julius Teuthorn, no.10 Beach
- George Ticknor's private library, no.8 Park St.
- Toll-Gate Circulating Library, no.665 East Broadway
- D.A. Tompkins, no.127 Hanover St.
- Treadwell Library, Massachusetts General Hospital

U

- Union Circulating Library, no.4 Cornhill, corner of Water St.; William Blagrove
- Union Mission Church Library
- Unitarian Association Library
- S.R. Urbino, foreign circulating library

V

- Village Church Library
- Vine Street Congregational Church Library

W

- Walker's Circulating Library
- J.B. Walker, no.1392 Tremont
- Thomas O. Walker, no.68 Cornhill
- Warren Street Chapel Library
- Washington Circulating Library, no.38 Newbury St.
- Washington Circulating Library, no.11 School St.
- Washingtonian Home Library
- West Boston Library, Cambridge St.
- West Church Library
- West Roxbury Free library, Centre St.
- West Roxbury High School Library
- Whig reading room, no.144 Washington St.
- Winkley & Boyd's Central library
- Workingmen's Reading Room

Y

- Boston Young Men's Christian Association Library (YMCA), Tremont Temple
- Young Men's Christian Union
- Young Women's Christian Association (YWCA), no.68 Warrenton
- Young Men's Working Association Library

Z

- Zion Church Library

== See also ==
- Books in the United States
- Culture in Boston
- List of booksellers in Boston
- List of libraries in 18th century Massachusetts
- Literature of New England
