= List of booksellers in Boston =

This is a partial list of booksellers in Boston, Massachusetts.

== Booksellers in Boston ==
=== 17th century ===
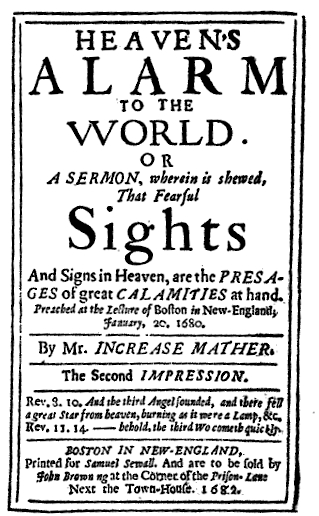
Heaven's alarm to the world. By Increase Mather. Boston: Printed for Samuel Sewell. And to be sold by John Browning at the corner of the Prison-Lane next to the Town-House. 1682

- John Allen
- William Avery
- Joseph Brunning (a.k.a. Joseph Browning), Court St.
- Nicholas Buttolph
- Duncan Campbell
- James Cowse
- John Dunton
- Benjamin Elliott, State St.
- John Foster
- Obadiah Gill
- John Griffin
- Benjamin Harris, Cornhill
- Vavasour Harris
- Elkanah Pembroke
- Michael Perry
- Samuel Phillips
- Edmund Ranger
- John Ratcliffe
- Samuel Sewall
- Andrew Thorncomb
- Hezekiah Usher
- John Usher
- James Wade
- Richard Wilkins

=== 18th century ===
- John Amory
- Andrew Barclay
- Ebenezer Battelle
- Nathaniel Belknap
- Caleb Blanchard, Dock Square
- Joshua Blanchard
- Nicholas Boone
- Nicholas Bowes
- John Boyles
- Cox & Berry
- Caleb Bingham
- John Boydell
- George Brownell
- Alford Butler
- Alford Butler Jr.
- John Campbell
- John Checkley
- James Foster Condy
- Jeremy Condy
- Cox & Berry; Edward Cox; Edward Berry
- T. Cox
- Michael Dennis
- John Edwards
- Joseph Edwards
- A. Ellison
- Benjamin Eliot
- John Eliot
- Samuel Eliot
- John Fleeming, 1760s-1770s
- John W. Folsom, Union St.
- Hopestill Foster
- Philip Freeman
- Richard Fry
- Samuel Gerrish
- Daniel Gookin
- Nathaniel Gookin
- Benjamin Gray
- William Gray
- Benjamin Guild, 1780s-1790s
- Thomas Hancock
- Charles Harrison
- Daniel Henchman, Cornhill
- John Hodgson
- William Lang
- John Langdon
- Samuel Kneeland
- Henry Knox; London Book-Store
- John Langdon
- Benjamin Larkin, Cornhill
- Ebenezer Larkin, Cornhill
- Thomas Leverett
- Bennet Love
- Walter MacAlpine
- William McAlpine
- John Mein; London Book-Store
- William Miller; Rivington & Miller, London Book-Store
- John Parker
- William Pelham
- John Pemberton
- John Perkins
- Joanna Perry, King St.
- Eleazer Phillips (a.k.a. Eleazar Phillips)
- Gillam Phillips
- John Phillips
- William Phillips
- Nathaniel Proctor
- Thomas Rand
- James Rivington; London Book-Store
- Samuel Robinson
- Ezekiel Russell
- Samuel Sewall, Jr.
- Francis Skinner
- Joseph Snelling
- William Spotswood
- Robert Starkey
- Samuel Webb
- David West
- John West
- Wharton & Bowes; John Wharton; Nicholas Bowes
- James White, Court St.
- Timothy White
- Joshua Winter

=== 19th century ===
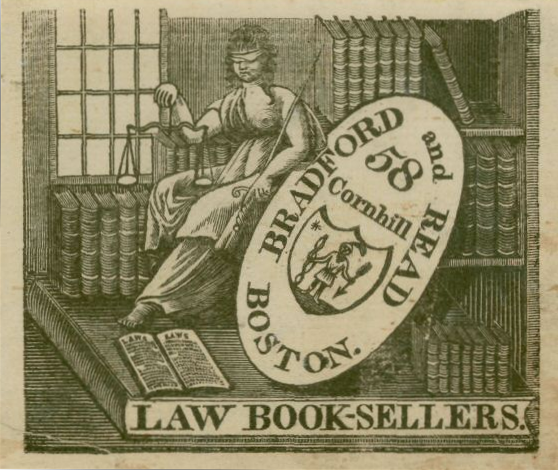
Bradford and Read, Law Book-Sellers. 58 Cornhill Boston, 1811

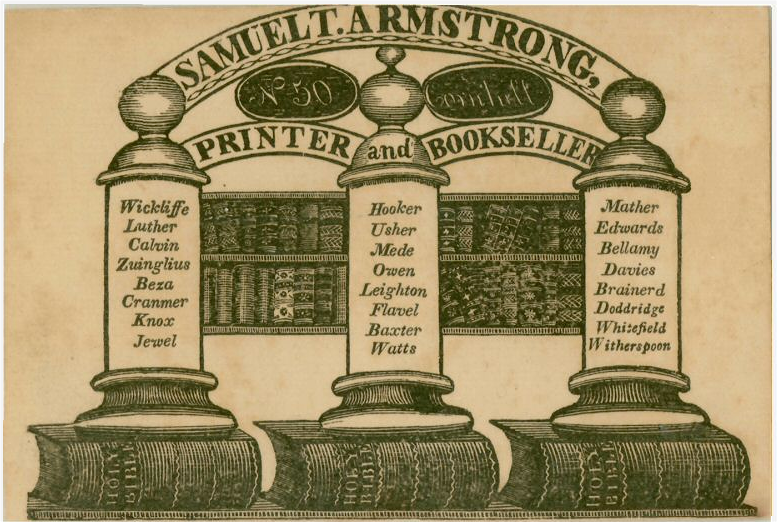
Samuel T. Armstrong, 1811

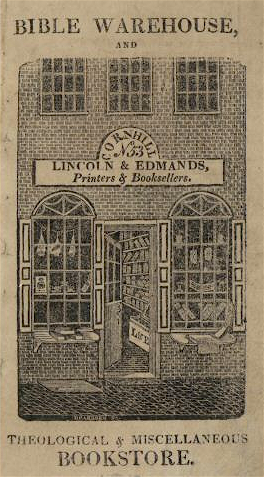
Lincoln & Edmands, 1815

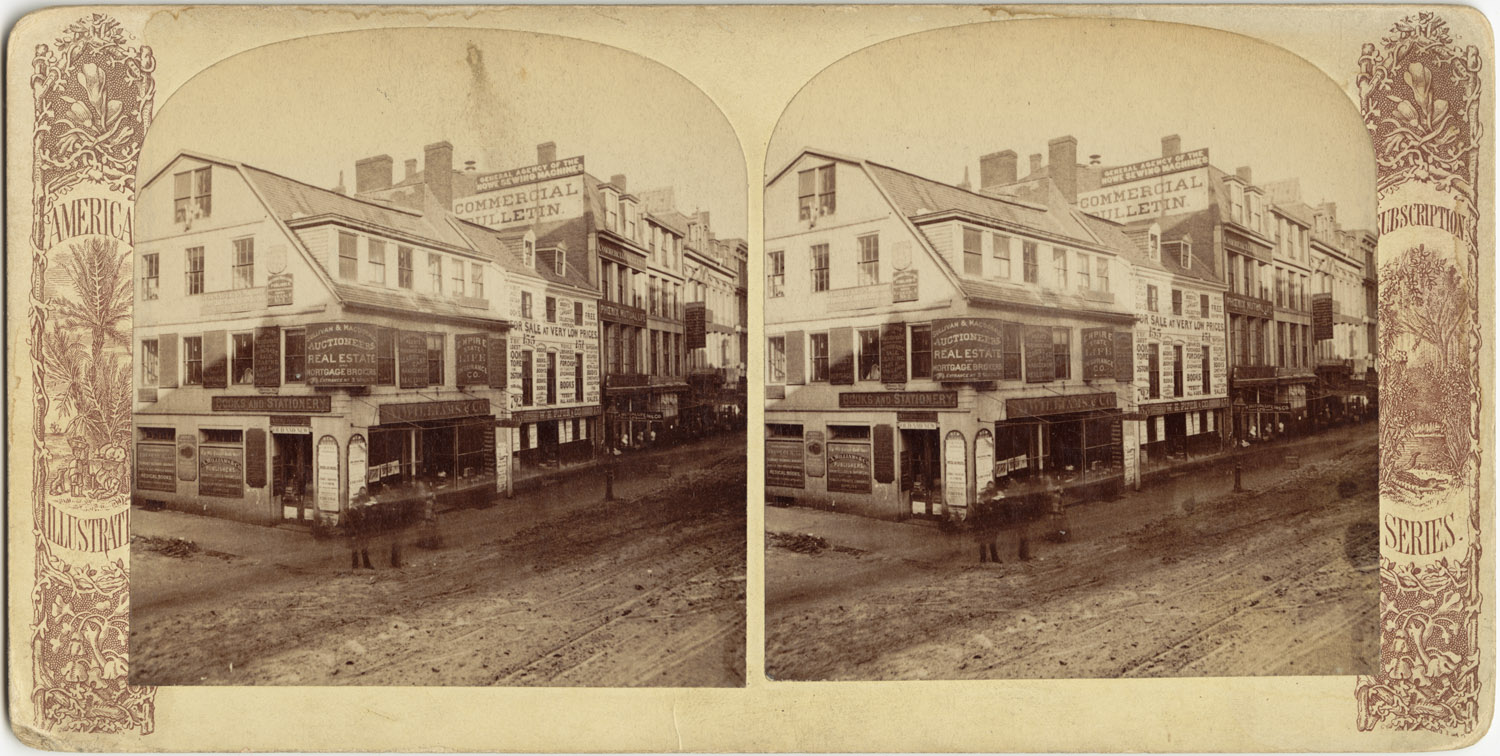
Old Corner Bookstore, Washington St.

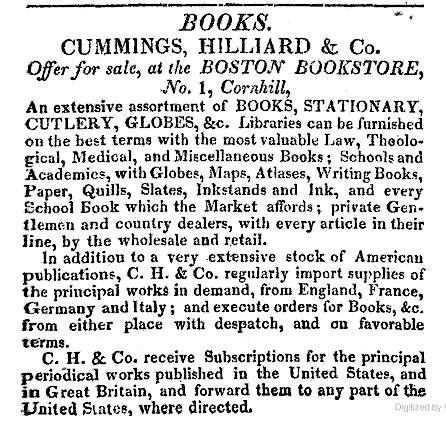
Cummings, Hilliard & Co., 1823

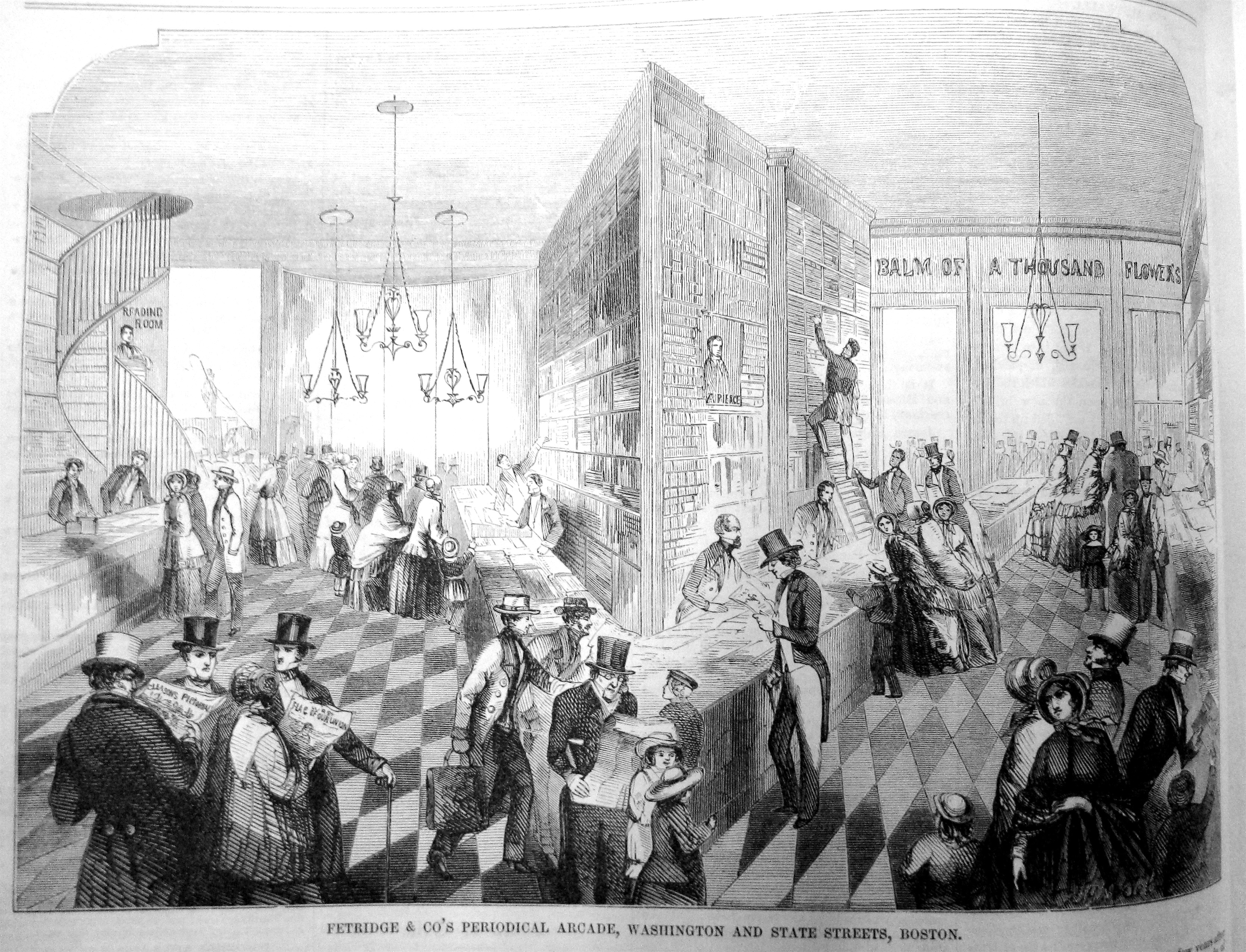
Fetridge & Co., 1852

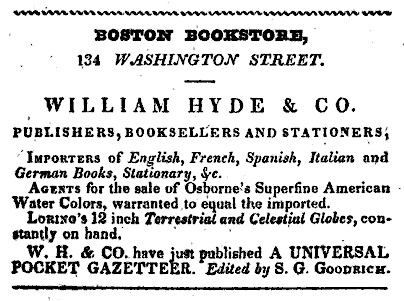
William Hyde & Co., 134 Washington St., 1832

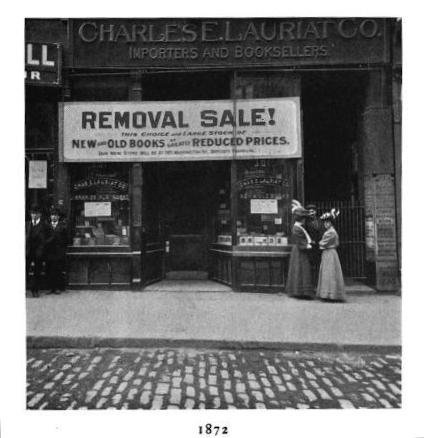
Lauriat's, Washington St., 1872

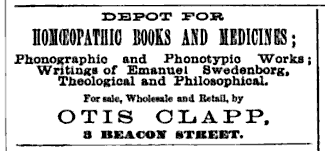
Otis Clapp, Beacon St., 1861

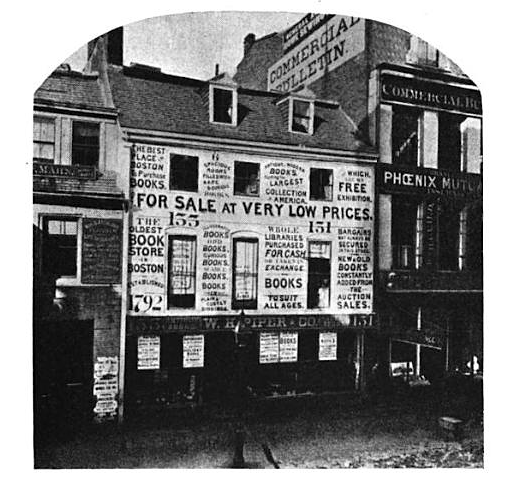
William H. Piper & Co., Washington St.

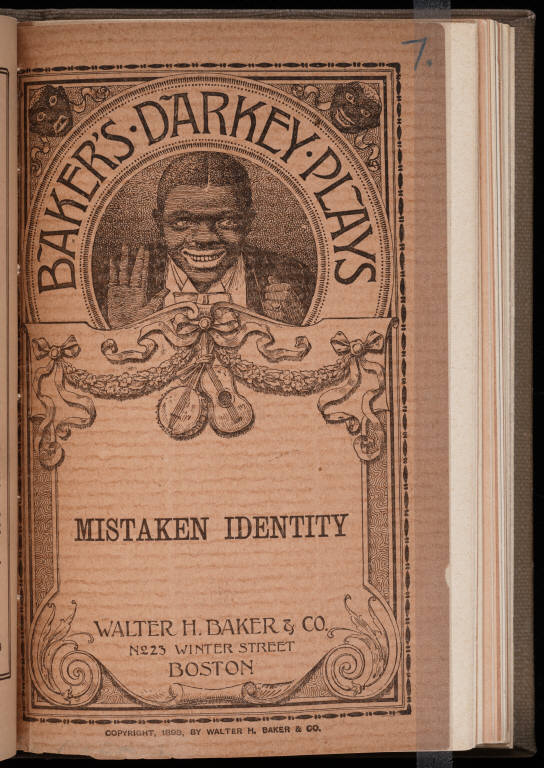
Mistaken Identity by George H. Coes, issued by Walter H. Baker, Winter St., Boston, 1893

- Joseph F. Alsworth; Crosby & Alsworth
- Samuel T. Armstrong, Cornhill
- N.J. Bartlett
- George M. Baker & Co.
- Walter H. Baker & Co.
- William Blagrove; Boston Book Store
- Boston Chart and Nautical Bookstore, Custom House St.; Charles L. Blake; Robert A. Blake
- Leonard C. Bowles, Cornhill
- Osmyn Brewster; Crocker & Brewster
- George W. Briggs, Washington St.
- Oliver L. Briggs & Co.
- Brown, Taggard & Chase, Cornhill
- Joseph Bumstead, State St.
- James W. Burditt, Court St.
- Burnham & Brothers, Cornhill
- Thomas Burnham, Cornhill
- James Campbell, Tremont St.
- George Clark, Dock Sq.
- Otis Clapp, School St.; Beacon St.
- Daniel C. Colesworthy
- George W. Cottrell, Cornhill
- Crosby & Nichols, Washington St.
- William Crosby, Washington St.
- Cummings, Hilliard & Co., Cornhill
- Robert S. Davis, Washington St.; R.S. Davis & Co.; P. Stearns Davis.
- William H. Dennet, Washington St.
- Oliver Ditson
- Patrick Donahoe, Franklin St.
- Estes and Lauriat
- Oliver Everett, Cornhill
- Charles Ewer, Cornhill
- Federhen & Co.; Charles Thacher
- William Pembroke Fetridge
- Fields, Osgood & Company
- William B. Fowle, 45 Cornhill
- Patrick Kevin Foley (a.k.a. P.K. Foley), Bromfield St.
- James French, Washington St.
- Richard L. Frye
- Horace B. Fuller
- M.H. Gaughan
- Edwin H. Gill
- Charles Goodspeed, Park Street
- Charles D. Gould; Gould & Lincoln
- Andrew F. Graves, Cornhill
- Benjamin H. Greene
- Oliver C. Greenleaf, Court St.
- William H. Halliday & Co., Cornhill
- Mrs. Mary Hickey, High St.
- Hickling, Swan & Brewer, Washington St.; Thomas M. Brewer
- Henry Hoyt
- Lemuel N. Ide, Washington St.
- John P. Jewett, Cornhill
- David P. King, Washington St.
- Charles Lauriat
- Joshua Lincoln; Gould & Lincoln
- Little, Brown & Co.; Augustus Flagg
- Littlefield's, Cornhill
- James Loring, Cornhill, Washington Street
- Josiah Loring, South Row
- Bela Marsh
- Hugh McDonnell, Washington St.
- George M. Merriam, Newbury (Washington) St.
- Israel Moody, Washington St.
- B. B. Mussey, Cornhill
- Munroe & Francis; Edmund Munroe, David Francis; Court St., Cornhill
- Sam F. Nichols; Nichols & Hall
- Old Corner Bookstore, Washington & School St.
- James R. Osgood & Co., Washington St.; E. Libby.
- James A.G. Otis, Washington St.
- Samuel H. Parker
- Elizabeth Palmer Peabody; West Street Bookstore
- Oliver L. Perkins, Cornhill
- James M. Piper
- William J. Reynolds & Co., Cornhill
- Benjamin B. Russell, Washington St.
- Francis S. Saxton, State St.
- Schoenhof & Moeller; Carl Schoenhof, Fanny Moeller
- Nathaniel S. Simpkins, Brattle St.
- George A. Snow; Snow, Boyden & Knight
- C.C. Soule
- William V. Spencer
- Charles Stimpson, Washington St.
- Strong & Brodhead, Cornhill
- Swedenborgian Book Store, Tremont St.
- Tappan & Whittemore, Washington St.
- Joseph Teal, Hanover St.
- William P. Tewksbury, Washington St.
- Ticknor and Fields
- John B. Tileston; Brewer & Tileston
- Abel Tompkins, Cornhill
- John Turner
- William Veazie
- John X. Watson
- Thomas Wells, Hanover St.
- Wells & Lilly; William Wells and Robert Lilly, Court St.
- Henry White
- Rev. Thomas Whittemore, Cornhill
- John K. Wiggin; Wiggin & Lunt

=== 20th century ===
- J.Q. Adams & Co.
- Avenue Victor Hugo, Newbury St.
- E.E. Babb & Co.
- Walter H. Baker & Co.
- N.J. Bartlett & Co.
- C.E. Beale
- F.W. Bird
- Boston Book Co.
- John A. Boyle & Co.
- Buddenbrooks
- Burnham's Antique Book Store; Richard C. Lichtenstein
- William A. Butterfield
- H.M. Caldwell Co.
- H.H. Carter & Co.
- Theo. H. Castor & Co.
- W.B. Clarke Co.
- William G. Colesworthy
- C. James Connelly
- H.M. Connor
- Curtis & Cameron
- Cupples & Schoenhof
- DeWolfe & Fiske Co.
- Eaton & Mains
- Dana Estes & Co.
- Thomas J. Flynn
- Patrick Kevin Foley (a.k.a. P.K. Foley), Beacon St.
- Four Seas Company, Copley Sq.
- Garden Side Book Shop, Boylston St.
- Ginn & Co.
- Globe Corner Bookstore
- Goodspeed's Book Shop
- J.L. Hammett Co.
- Mrs. H.L. Hastings
- D.C. Heath & Co.
- F.C. Herrick, Copley Sq.
- Home Library and Supply Assoc.
- Houghton & Dutton
- Houghton, Mifflin & Co., Park St.
- George W. Humphrey
- Jordan Marsh
- Keep's Book Store, Columbus Ave.
- E.L. Kellogg & Co.
- Knight & Millet, Columbus Ave.
- C.A. Koehler & Co.
- Lauriat's, Washington St.
- A.A. Lewis, Hanover St.
- C.F. Libbie
- Little, Brown and Company
- George E. Littlefield, Cornhill
- Lee Lothrop & Shepherd
- A.D. Maclachlan
- Bertha Mahony
- Mutual Book Co., Franklin St.
- A.J. Ochs Co.; Boston Neck Book Store, Washington St.
- Old Corner Book Store, Bromfield St.
- Pitts-Kimball Co.
- George H. Polley, Court St.
- John A. Ryan, Brattle St.
- Smith & McCance, Bromfield St.
- South End Book Store, Washington St.
- Waterstone's
- R.H. White & Co.
- Women's Educational and Industrial Union; Bookshop for Boys and Girls

=== 21st century ===
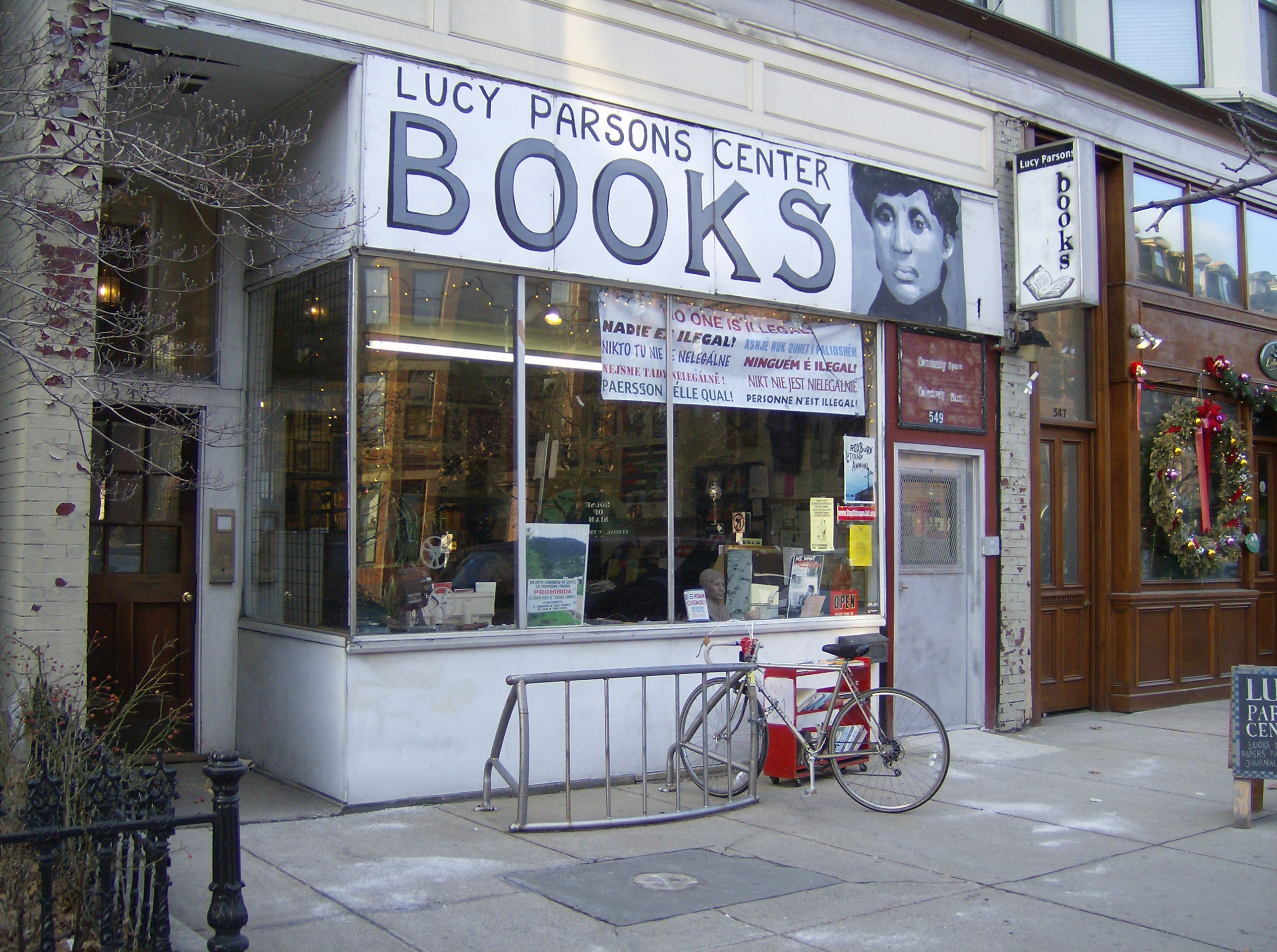
Lucy Parsons Center, Columbus Ave., 2007

- Ars Libri, Harrison Ave.
- Barnes & Noble
- F. A. Bernett Books
- Borders
- Boston Book Company
- Brattle Book Shop, West St.
- Bromer Booksellers, Boylston St.
- Buddenbrooks, Newbury Street
- Commonwealth Books
- James F. O'Neil
- Lucy Parsons Center, Columbus Ave.
- Peter L. Stern & Co.
- Trident Booksellers, Newbury St.

== See also ==
- Books in the United States
- Early American publishers and printers
- Bibliography of early American publishers and printers
- List of early American publishers and printers

== General and cited references ==
17th-century

- Isaiah Thomas. History of printing in America, 2nd ed. 1874.
- George Emery Littlefield (1900), Early Boston booksellers 1642-1711, Boston: The Club of odd volumes, OCLC 3573345, OL 6929406M Google books
- George Emery Littlefield. The early Massachusetts press, 1638-1711. Boston: Club of Odd Volumes, 1907.
- Worthington Chauncey Ford. The Boston book market, 1679-1700. Boston: Club of Odd Volumes, 1917.

18th-century

- Boston Directory. 1789.
- Isaiah Thomas. History of printing in America, 2nd ed. 1874.
- Henry Knox - Bookseller. Proceedings of the Massachusetts Historical Society, Third Series, Vol. 61. June 1928, p. 227+

19th-century

- Boston Directory. 1823.
- Boston Directory. 1849.
- Boston Directory. 1858.
- Boston Directory. 1868.
- Sargent. Lauriat's, 1872-1922: being a sketch of early Boston booksellers. 1922.

20th-century

- James Clegg. International directory of booksellers and bibliophile's manual. 1906.
