= Salem Philosophical Library =

- Location: Salem, Massachusetts, United States
- Established: 1781
- Closed: 1810

The Salem Philosophical Library (1781–1810) or Philosophical Library Company was a proprietary library in Salem, Massachusetts. Men affiliated with the library included: Tho. Bancroft, Thomas Barnard, William Bentley, Joseph Blaney, Nathaniel Bowditch, Manasseh Cutler, Nathan Dane, Joshua Fisher, Edward Augustus Holyoke, Joseph Mc'keen, B. Lynde Oliver, Joseph Orne, William Prescott, Samuel Page, Joshua Plummer, John Prince, Nathan Read, John D. Treadwell, Ichabod Tucker, and Joseph Willard. "The Library was kept at the house of Rev. Joseph Willard of Beverly, till ... December, 1781. ... His successor was Rev. Dr. Prince, who had the volumes at his mansion" in Salem. "By 1810, many of the members of the [Salem] Social Library also belonged to the Philosophical Library, and the two bodies were merged to create the Salem Athenaeum."

"The Philosophical Library had as nucleus the valuable private library of Dr. Richard Kirwan of Dublin, captured with the cargo of the British ship 'Mars' by the ship 'Pilgrim' belonging to John and Andrew Cabot of Beverly." "The Rev. John Prince was desired to attend the auction and make the purchase. Accordingly on the 12th of April, 1781, the said books, consisting of the greater part of the Philosophical Transactions of the French Academy, the Royal Society of London, and the Society of Berlin; ... the works of Sir Robert Boyle compleat ... — making in all 116 volumes."

== Titles in the Library ==
- Transactions of the Royal Society of London
- Transactions of the Royal Society of Edinburgh
- Transactions of the Royal Irish Academy
- Memoires de l'Academie Royale des Sciences, 1661–1699, Paris, 14 vols.
- Histoire de l'Académie Royale des Sciences, 1699–1761, 63 vols.
- Memoires of the French Institute
- Miscellanea Berolinensia
- Tilloch's Philosophical Magazine
- Repertory of Arts and Manufactures
- Bernoullii Opera, 9 vols.
- Boyles' Works
- Maclaurin's Fluxions
- Encyclopædia Britannica
- Buffon's Histoire Naturelle, 15 vols.

== See also ==
- Salem Athenaeum (est. 1810), successor to the Philosophical Library
