= Glenn Hughes (producer) =

American theater producer (1894–1964)

Glenn Hughes (December 7, 1894 – March 21, 1964) wrote for the theater, published theater history, taught at the university level and ran several theaters in Seattle, Washington. He was the founder of the School of Drama at the University of Washington and its first director.

== Academic career ==
He graduated from Stanford University in 1916, then taking a teaching position at Bellingham State Normal School, from 1916 to 1918. He received a master's degree from the University of Washington around 1920. For his thesis project, he submitted poetry instead of an analytical study. He received a Guggenheim fellowship in 1928. The research, carried out over the course of several years, led to the publication of Imagism and the Imagists: A Study in Modern Poetry (1930, 2nd. ed. 1961).

Hughes taught at Scripps College for only a year (1929–1930) and then went back to the University of Washington and remained on the faculty there for the rest of his academic career. Two theaters on or near campus resulted from his efforts and thrived under his leadership: The Showboat (since 1938) and The Penthouse (since 1940); Hughes was later able to secure The Playhouse Theatre for less conventional performances. As a result, the Seattle campus was the only one in the US to have three theaters presenting shows. The Penthouse was later named „The Glenn Hughes Penthouse Theatre‟ in his honor.

== Historian ==
Hughes wrote a one-volume history of the theater which received extensive attention from Edward Gordon Craig, who published a commentary on Hughes' coverage of Craig's work.

== Playwright ==
He wrote mostly for non-professional productions which were performed in the academic settings he himself worked in for most of his life. Priorities were for easy casting and minimal production requirements. Hughes was aware of the latest trends in theater arts, but as a practitioner he opted for light entertainment, particularly favoring comedies.

== Bibliography (in chronological order) ==
- Souls and Other Poems. Paul Elder and Co., 1917.
- Broken Lights; A Book of Verse. U Of Washington, 1920.
- Pierrot's Mother; A Fantastic Play in One Act. Stewart Kidd, 1923.
- Bottled in Bond; A Tragic Farce in One Act. D. Appleton and Co., 1925.
- Harlequinade in Green and Orange; Sketch in One Act. Samuel French, 1925.
- Lady Fingers; A Comedy in One Act. Samuel French, 1925.
- New Plays for Mummers; A Book of Burlesques, with Block-Print Illustrations by Richard Bennett. U of Washington Book Store, 1926.
- Showing Up Mabel; A Comedy in One Act. Samuel French, 1926.
- Three Women Poets of Modern Japan: A Book of Translations by Glenn Hughes and Yozan T. Iwasaki, U of Washington Book Store, 1927.
- Happiness For Six, A Comedy in Three Acts. Row, Peterson & Co., 1928.
- The Story of the Theatre: A Short History of Theatrical Art from its Beginnings to the Present Day. Samuel French, 1928. Reprint 1931.
- Komachi, A Romantic Drama of Old Japan in Three Acts. Longmans, Green and Co., 1929. Reprint 1931.
- None Too Good for Dodo; A Comedy of Bad Manners. D. Appleton and Co., 1929.
- Imagism & The Imagists: A Study in Modern Poetry. Stanford UP; Oxford UP, 1931. Reprint Biblo and Tannen, 1972.
- Green Fire; A Melodrama of 1990, in Three Acts (Based on a Novel of the same Title by John Taine [Pseud.]). Samuel French, 1932.
- What Do You Think? A Three-Act Comedy. Walter H. Baker Co., 1932.
- Dollars to Doughnuts; A Farce in Three Acts. Samuel French, 1934.
- Guess Again; A Farce in Three Acts. Row, Peterson & Co. 1935.
- Happy Days; A Farce-Comedy in Three Acts. Walter H. Baker Co., 1936.
- Happy-Go-Lucky; A Farce in Three Acts. Row, Peterson & Co., 1936.
- Small-Town Girl; A Comedy in One Act. Dramatists Play Service, 1937.
- Spring Fever; A Farce in Three Acts. Row, Peterson & Co., 1937.
- Beginners Luck; A Farce in Three Acts. Row, Peterson & Co., 1938.
- Dinner For Two; A Comedy in One Act. Samuel French, 1938.
- Romance, Inc.; A Comedy for Women in One Act. Dramatists Play Service, 1938.
- Enchanted Night; A Play in One Act. Dramatists Play Service, 1939.
- Running Wild; A Farce in Three Acts. Row, Peterson & Co., 1939.
- Going Places; A Farce in Three Acts. Row, Peterson & Co., 1940.
- Midsummer Madness; A Farce in Three Acts. Walter H. Baker Co., 1940.
- Double Or Nothing; A Farce in Three Acts. Dramatists Play Service, 1941.
- Midnight; A Mystery-Comedy in Three Acts. Row, Peterson & Co., 1941.
- The Good Sport, A Comedy in One Act. Samuel French, 1941.
- Suspense; A Mystery-Comedy in Three Acts. Row, Peterson & Co., 1942.
- The Penthouse Theatre, its History and Technique. Samuel French, 1942 And 1945.

Reprint U of Washington Book Store, 1950.
Reprint Greenwood P, 1969.

- Ask Me Another; A Farce-Comedy in Three Acts. Row, Peterson & Co. 1943.
- Accidents Will Happen; A Farce-Comedy in Three Acts. Row, Peterson & Co., 1944.
- Believe It Or Not; A Farce in Three Acts. Baker's Plays, 1945.
- The Green Scarab; A Mystery-Comedy in Three Acts. Row, Peterson & Co., 1945.
- You're Only Young Once; A Farce Comedy in Three Acts. Baker's Plays, 1945.
- Your Money Or Your Wife; A Farce in Three Acts. Baker's Plays, 1945.
- Knock On Wood; A Mystery Comedy in Three Acts. Baker's Plays, 1949.
- Mrs. Carlyle; A Historical Play. U of Washington Book Store, 1950.
- A History of the American Theatre, 1700–1950. Samuel French, 1951.
- Bon Voyage; A Comedy. U of Washington Book Store, 1951.
- Academe; A Book Of Characters. U of Washington Book Store, 1952.
- Dray Froyen Poeṭn Fun Modernem Yapan, with Yeḥezḳel Bronshṭayn. 1952
- The Dream and the Deed; A Stage Cavalcade of Seattle's Hundred Years. The Official Play of the Seattle Centennial. U of Washington Book Store, 1952.
- Notion Counter; A Book of Poems. F. McCaffrey, 1953.
- The Magic Apple; A Comedy with Music in Five Scenes. Samuel French, 1954.
- Trivia; Poetic Footnotes for an Unwritten Autobiography. U of Washington Book Store, 1956.
- Imagism & The Imagists; A Study in Modern Poetry. Bowes & Bowes, 1960.
- Fish, Fowl, and Limericks; With an added Lyrical Bouquet. Decorations by the Author. U of Washington Book Store, 1962.
