= Edward Gorey House =

Former home of American writer and illustrator Edward Gorey

Elephant House
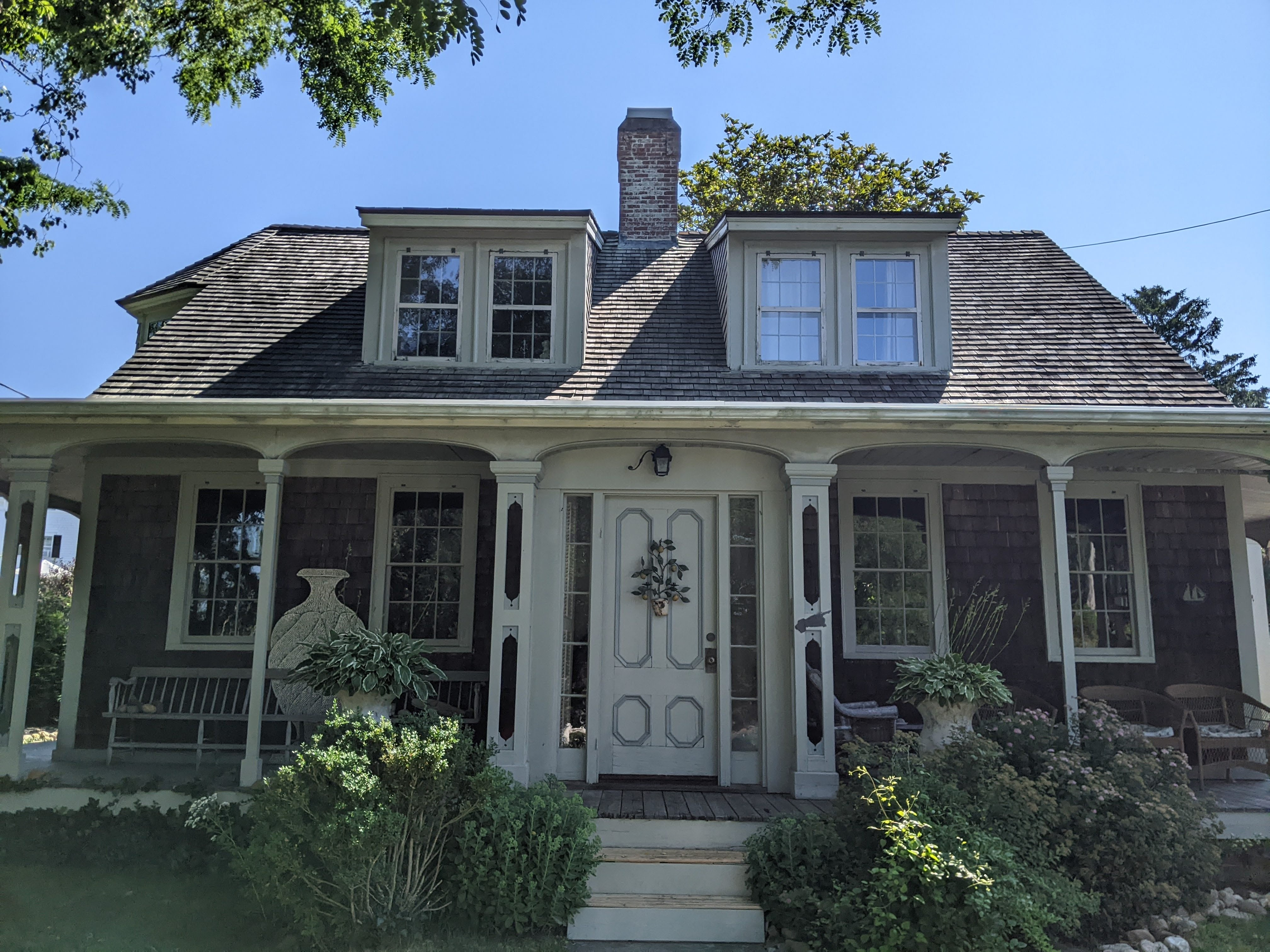
- The front exterior of the house in 2022.

- Location within Massachusetts Location within the United States
- 41°42′19″N 70°14′33″W
- Location: 8 Strawberry Lane, Yarmouth Port, Massachusetts, US

The Edward Gorey House, also known as the Elephant House, is the home on Cape Cod in which Edward Gorey—author, illustrator, puppeteer, and playwright—lived and worked from 1986 until his death in 2000. The house currently serves as a museum celebrating Gorey's life and work and is open annually from April to December.

Gorey had a respect and passion for animals, cats in particular. The activities of the house, from art education to interactive exhibits, reflect Gorey's support of animal welfare.

== Overview ==
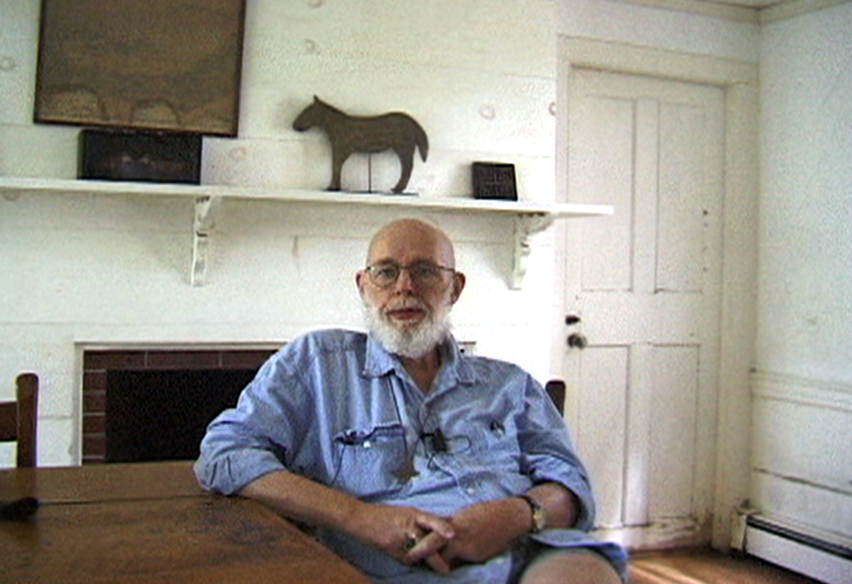
Gorey in the home in 1999

The house, located on Strawberry Lane, was originally built in the early 1800s. In the 1830s, it was purchased by Yarmouth businessman Nathaniel Stone Simpkins, whose descendants lived in the home until they sold it to Edward Gorey in 1979.

Gorey collected all sorts of objects; some of them were discarded objects found at the side of the road. He arranged and displayed such items on his porch and throughout the house. He also had a large collection of books and an overflowing library.

Elephant House is also notable for its large southern magnolia tree in its yard, a species not usually found so far north.

== Preservation ==
A 2002 grant from the Highland Street Foundation allowed the house to be purchased and the museum to be established. The Edward Gorey Charitable Trust, the owner of his intellectual property, regularly loans materials to the House.

== Gallery ==
The Museum has a display of the Edward Gorey binding project.

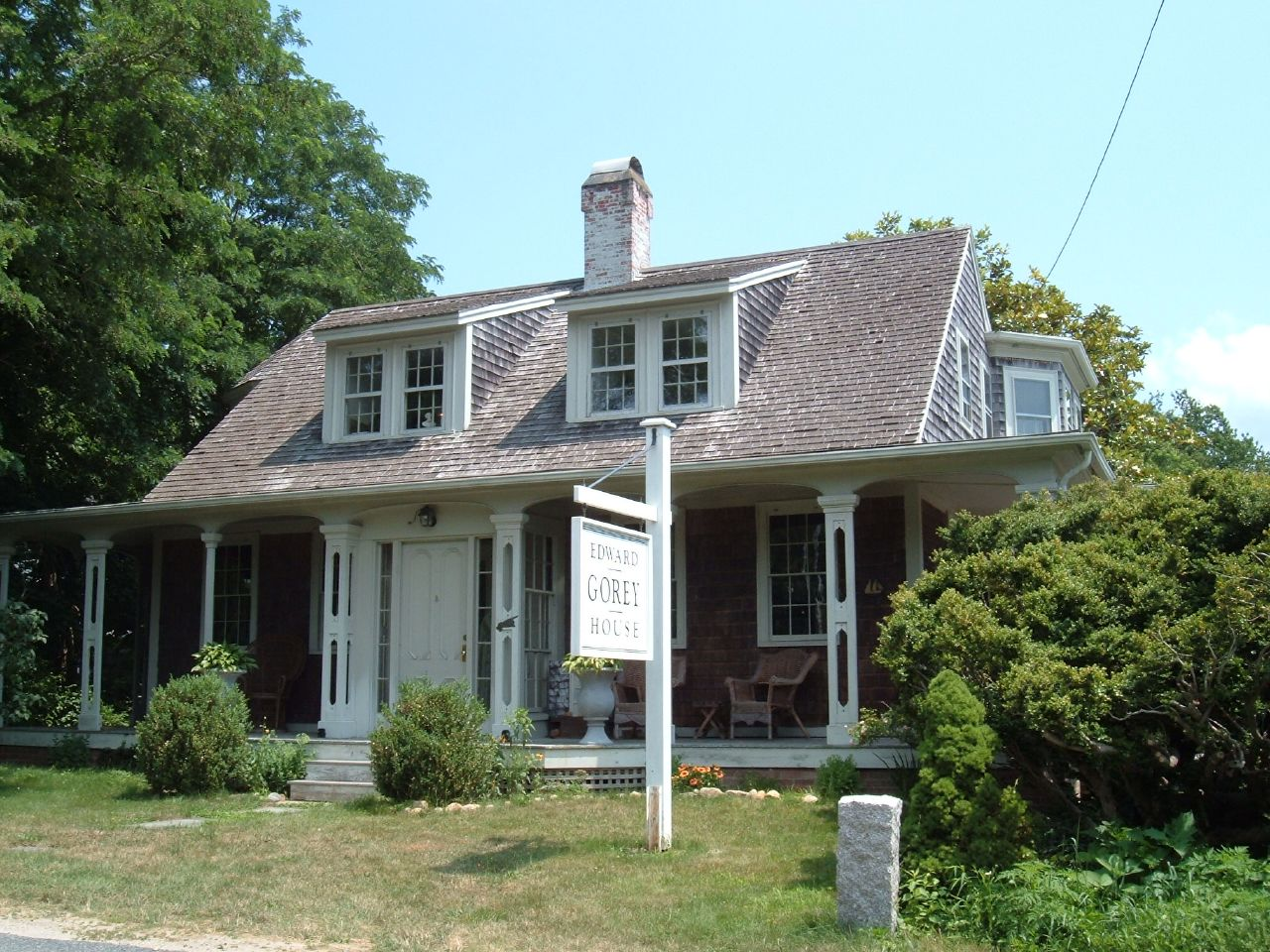

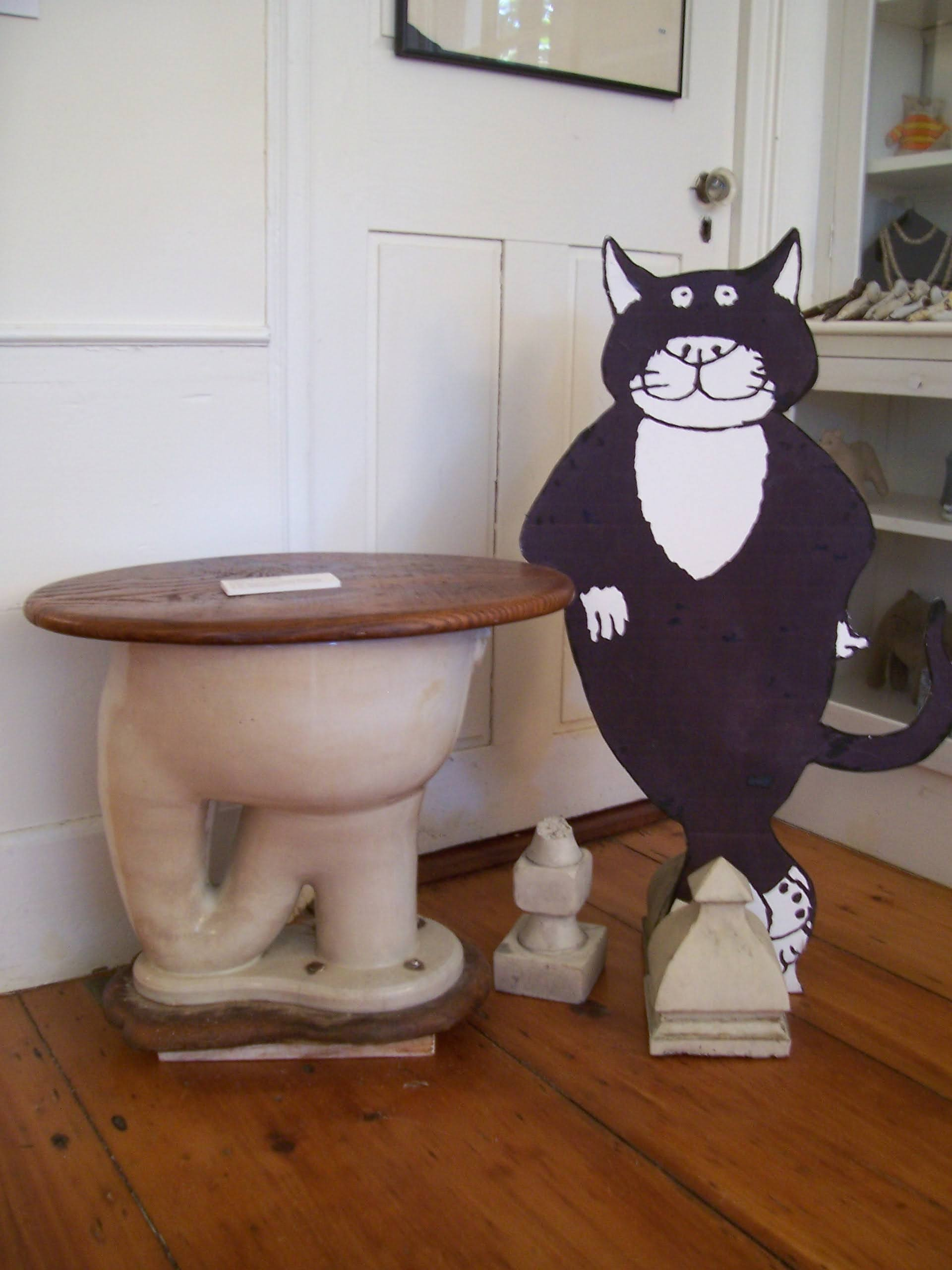

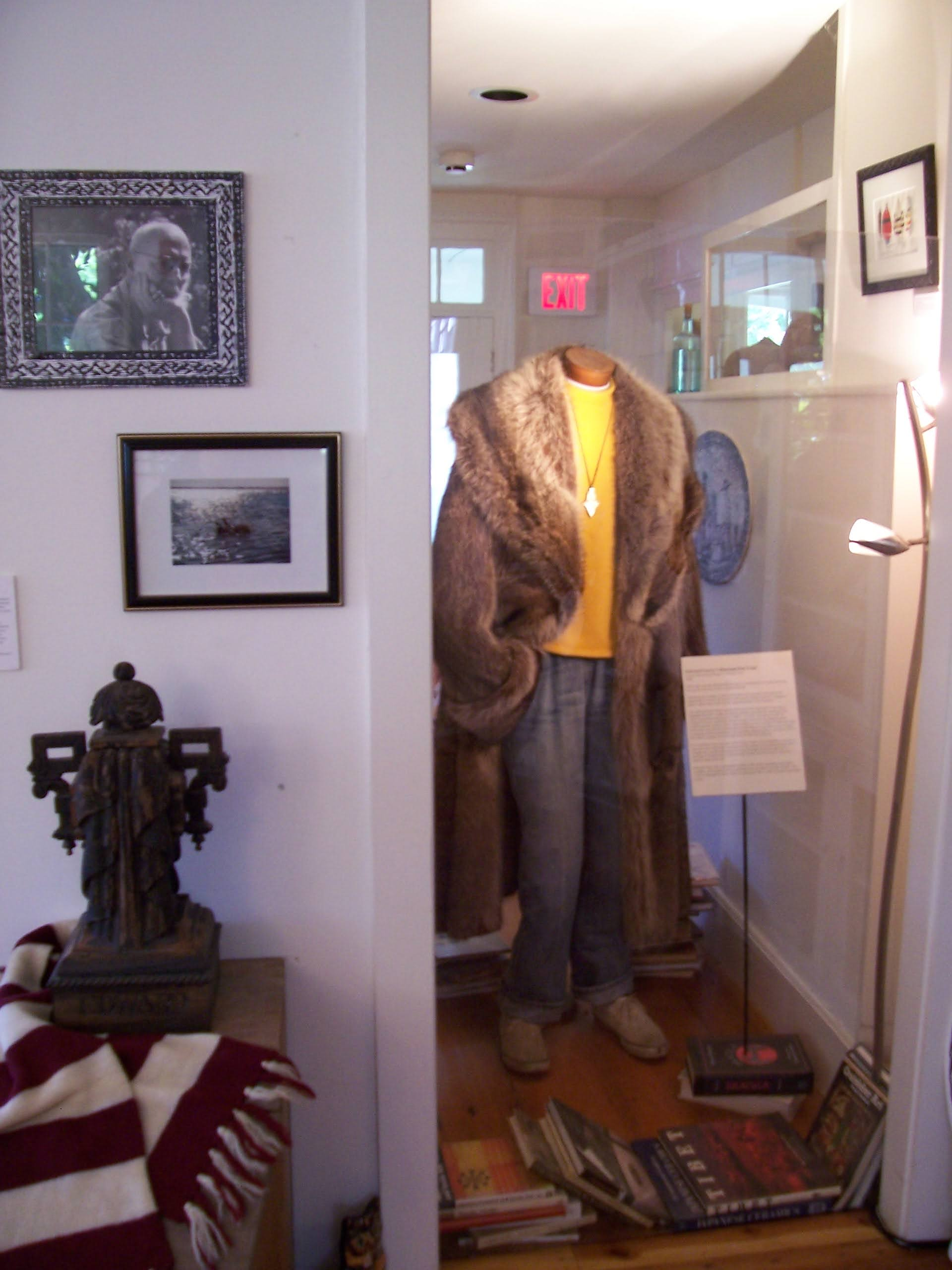

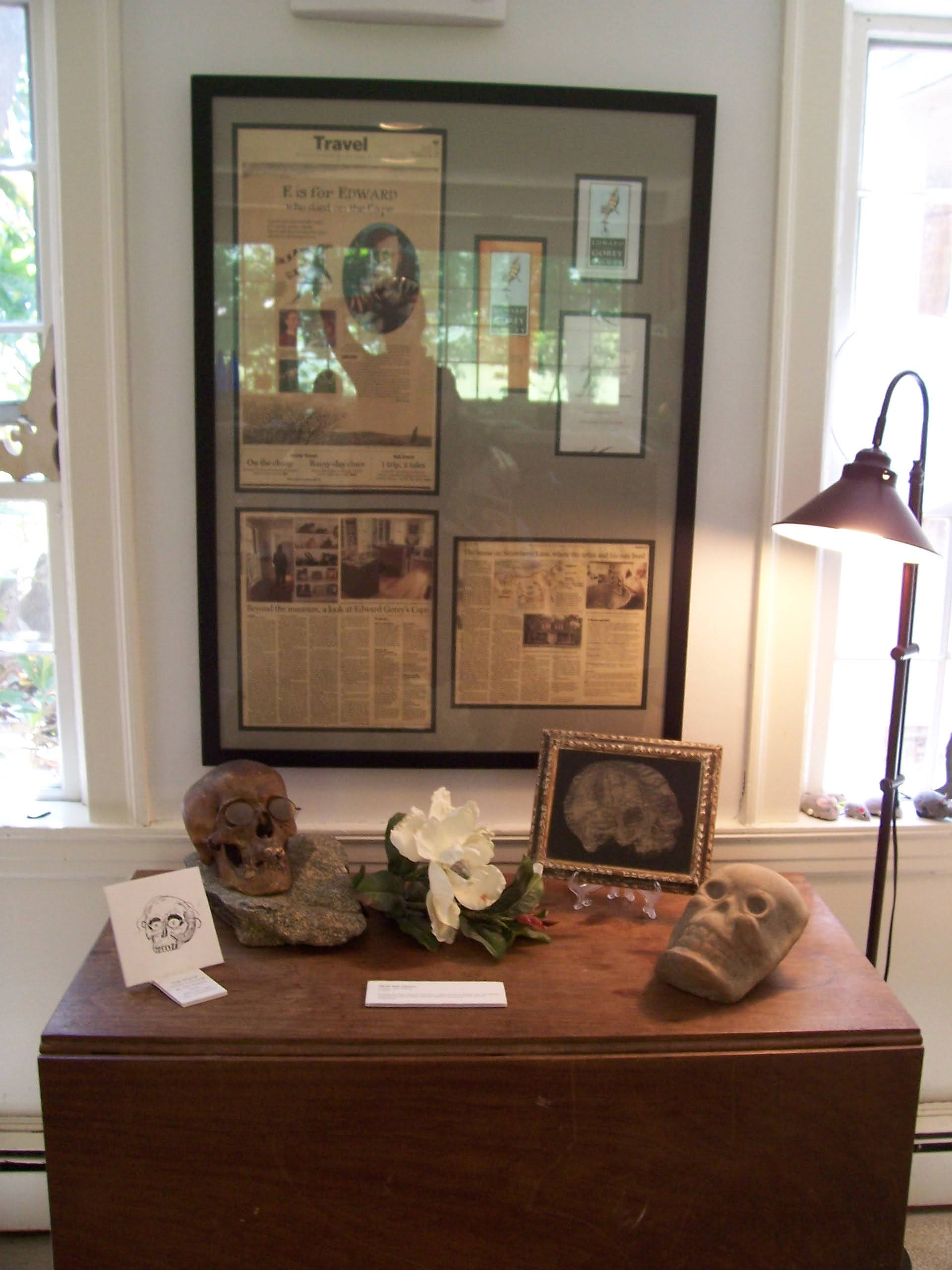

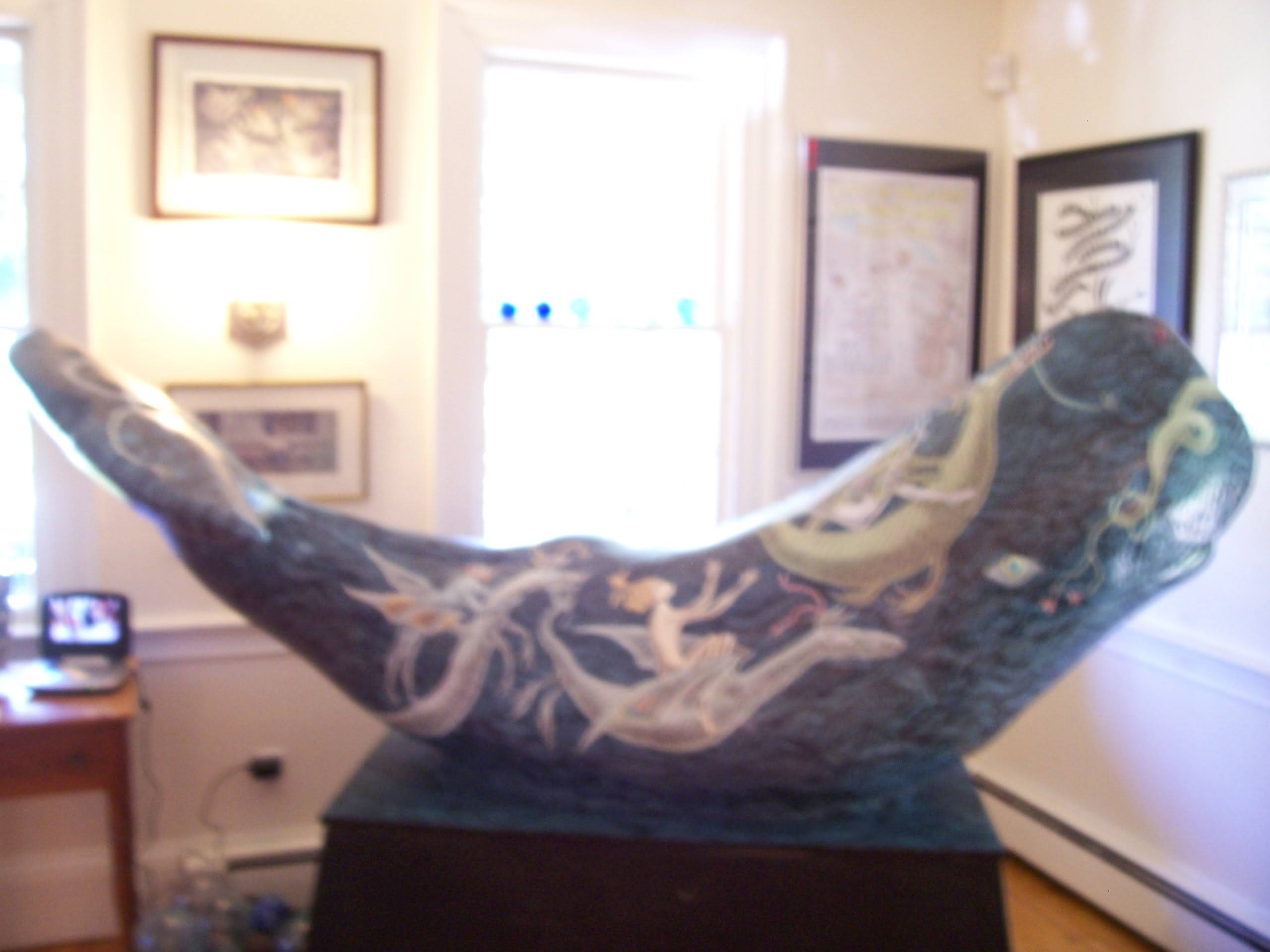
