= Salem Athenaeum =

Library in Massachusetts

Coordinates: 42.520429°N 70.900502°W

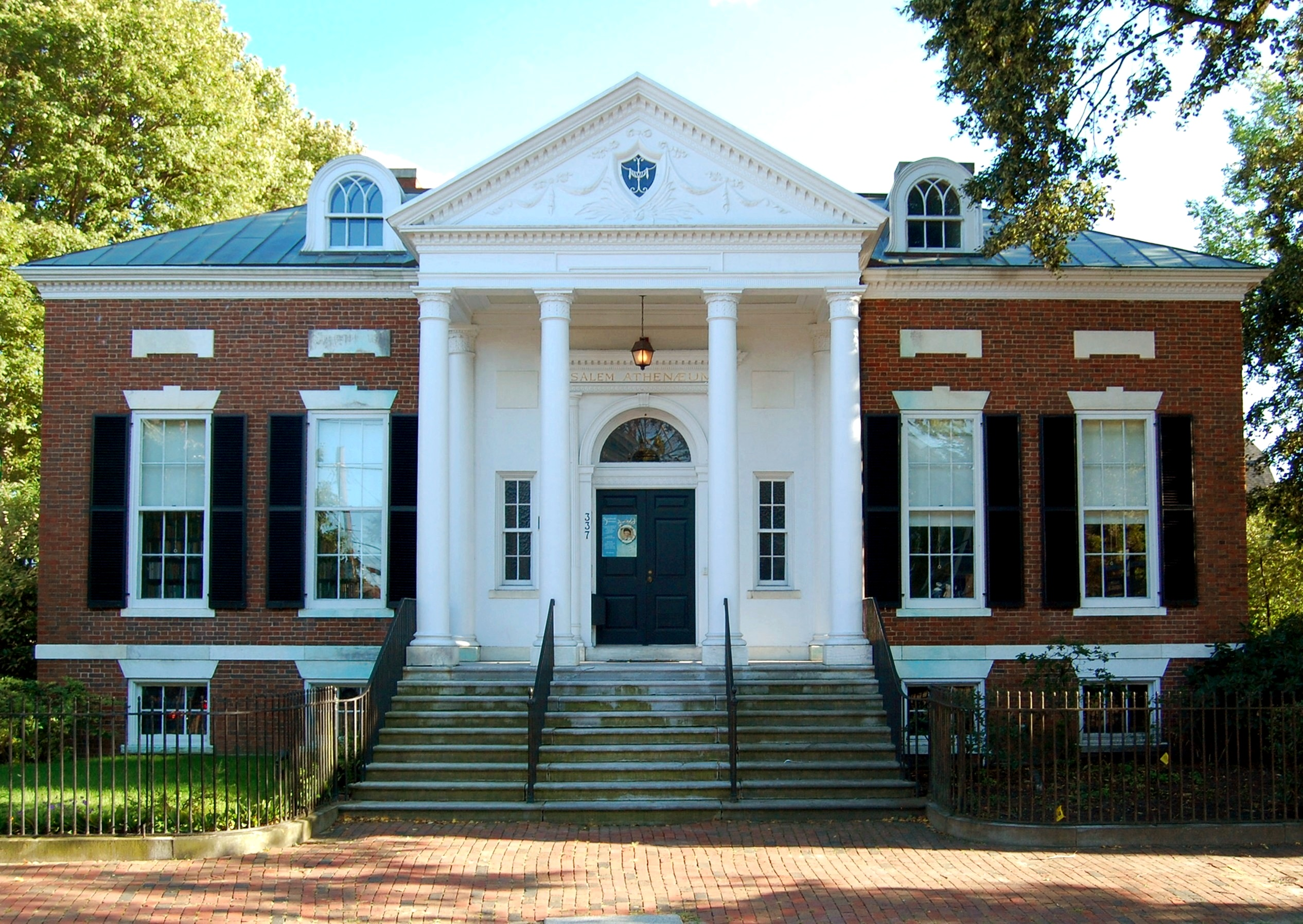
Location of the Salem Athenaeum since 1907, a Federal style building on Essex Street

The Salem Athenaeum, founded in 1810, is one of the oldest membership libraries in the United States. The Athenaeum is located at 337 Essex Street in Salem, Massachusetts in the McIntire Historic District.

In 2023, the athenaeum successfully completed a restoration project for the historic building. They are currently raising funds to make the building more accessible to meet modern library standards.

== History ==
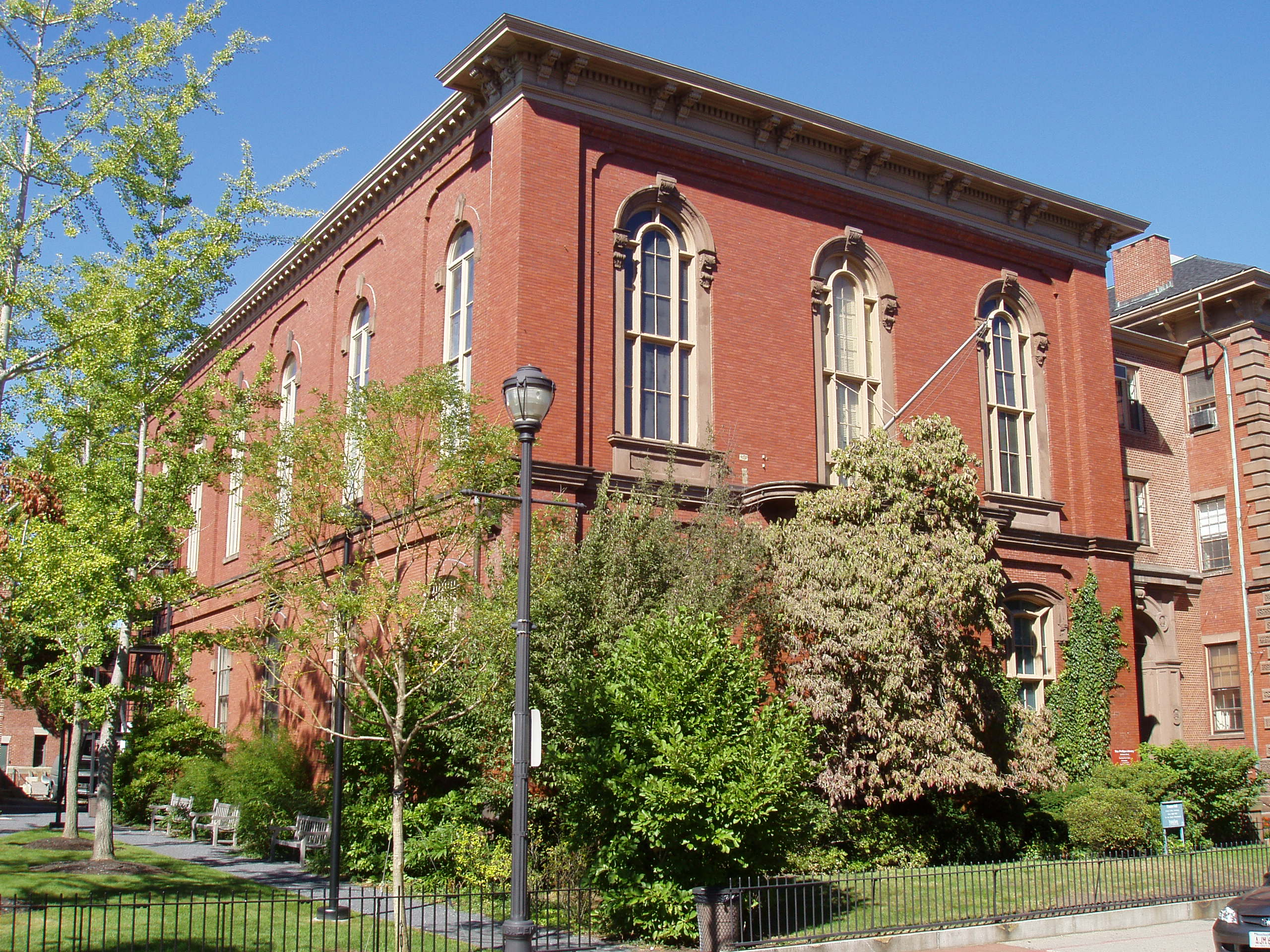
Plummer Hall, formerly Salem Athenaeum before sold in 1905 to the Essex Institute

The Salem Athenaeum was founded in 1810 by the merger of two antecedent organizations: the Social Library, founded in 1760, and the Salem Philosophical Library, founded in 1781. The first president was Edward Augustus Holyoke. When the athenaeum first opened, the collection was made up of 2,700 books. The combined collections included books from the United States and England and other parts of Europe. Individual members also donated books from their personal libraries over the years.

The Athenaeum's first permanent building was constructed in the 1850s with a large bequest from Caroline Plummer. In 1905 the Athenaeum sold that building and used the proceeds to build their current facility, which was dedicated in 1907.

== Collections ==
Members of the Salem Athenaeum can pick up books on-site, curbside, and have books delivered to their home. Salem Athenaeum uses the website LibraryThing to host their online catalogue. The Kirwan Collection, the oldest collection, is on permanent display.

For much of the 19th century, librarians were appointed to work just one day a week to do mostly clerical work and the Board of Trustees decided book purchases. Between 1885 and 1947, Miss Alice Homans Osborne served as appointed librarian of the Salem Athenaeum after graduating from high school. Osborne reclassified the collection to the Dewey Decimal system between 1895 and 1898. The first professional librarian of the Salem Athenaeum was Cynthia Wiggins. Wiggins stayed in the position from 1960 to 1994.

Today, the collections include over 50,000 volumes on diverse topics.

== Programs and Events ==
The Salem Athenaeum offers a variety of programs including book groups, Summer Salons, annual Adams Lecture which focuses on American history, exhibitions, and writer's groups.

The Salem Literary Festival is an annual literary event. Cornerstone Books (closed 2010) started the festival in 2008. From 2017 to the present, the Salem Athenaeum is the primary presenter of the festival.

== Notable proprietors ==
- Frank Weston Benson
- Nathaniel Bowditch
- Nathaniel Hawthorne

== See also ==
- John Tucker Daland House
- Salem Philosophical Library (1781–1810), predecessor to the Athenaeum
- Salem Social Library (1760–1810), predecessor to the Athenaeum
