= Emilie Loring =

American writer (1866–1951)

Emilie Baker Loring (September 5, 1866 – March 13, 1951) was an American romance novelist of the 20th century. She began writing in 1914 at the age of 50 and continued until her death after a long illness in 1951. After her death, her estate was managed by her sons, Selden M. and Robert M. Loring. Based on a wealth of unfinished material they discovered, the sons published 20 more books under her name until 1972. These books were ghostwritten by Elinore Denniston.

== Personal life ==
Emilie Loring was born in Boston, Massachusetts, in 1866 to George M. Baker and Emily Frances (Boles) Baker. Her father was a playwright and publisher and her mother was a homemaker. Loring married Victor J. Loring, who was a lawyer. She died in Wellesley, Massachusetts, on March 13, 1951. At the time of her death, Loring had sold more than a million copies of her first 30 books.

Loring's sister, Rachel Baker Gale, wrote a number of suffrage parlor plays.

Loring's son, Selden M. Loring, was also an author. He wrote Young Buckskin Spy (Lantern Press, 1954) and Mighty Magic: An Almost-True Story of Pirates and Indians (Holliday House, 1964).

The papers of Emilie Loring are housed in the Department of Special Collections, Boston University, Mugar Memorial Library.

== Works ==
Most of Loring's books are highly romantic mysteries that focus on a young, independent woman with courage and ideals who finds herself in a tricky situation, relies on the help of a strong, handsome man, and ends up with him at the end of the story. Beyond romance and mystery, her books also explore a selection of topics including marriage, love, the work ethic, American patriotism, freedom, and optimism.

She enjoyed painting pictures with words, often describing the environment, architecture, dress, food, and physical features of characters in exacting and colorful detail. In the books published after she died, much of the colorful description was left out. Another major difference in the books published before and after the author's death is the characters' language, shifting away from American slang.

Loring's work features several repeating motifs; among them are a heroine in her early 20s with dark hair, a dark-haired lawyer or aspiring politician for a hero, a secondary male predisposed to speaking in quotations, a "sleek" bad guy, a wise, older woman who may or may not end up with a wise, older man who has long been in love with her, a flirtatious blond woman vying for the hero, and New England as a setting or character trait: "New England granite". Often-used plot devices in her novels include an orphaned character, a marriage of convenience or contract, a clandestine marriage, and trouble coming from outside a well-knit social structure.

Her book Beyond the Sound of Guns (1945) is referenced nine times in America's Popular Sayings: Over 1600 Expressions on Topics from Beauty to Money and Everything in Between by Gregory Titelman, citing phrases that turn out to be quotes or paraphrases from someone else.

== Publishing and copyright history ==
Her earlier books, from 1922 to 1937, were originally published in hardcover by William Penn & Company in Philadelphia. Her books from 1938 to 1950 were originally published by Little, Brown and Company, as were all of her posthumous works. All 30 of her novels written during her lifetime were reprinted by Grosset (now Grosset & Dunlap) in 1961. Later, all of her works were reprinted in mass-market paperback editions by the romance division of Bantam Books.

As late as 2005, Thorndike Press, an imprint of Thomson Gale, was reprinting select titles in large-print format, although its website did not show them in its 2007 catalog. Emilie Loring's sons, Robert and Selden, are listed as "child of the author" in searchable copyright renewal records. The Loring family asserted its rights to copyright in 2016 and is now re-publishing Emilie Loring's works.

Selden was listed first in the copyright information from 1955 to 1960 (or 1961?). From 1962 to 1971, Robert is listed first in the copyright information. In the 1972 novel The Shining Years, only Robert is listed as the copyright owner as the executor of the estate of Emilie Baker Loring.

== List of published works ==
=== As Josephine Story ===
==== Articles and short stories ====
- "Rush order for fancy dress". St. Nicholas Magazine, Vol. 41, p. 977, September 1914.
- "Gossip; an endless chain". St. Nicholas Magazine, Vol. 42, p. 508-9, April 1915.
- "The delicate art of being a mother-in-law". Woman's Home Companion, vol. 46, p. 100, June 1919.

==== Books ====
- For the Comfort of the Family; a Vacation Experiment (George H. Doran Company, 1914)
- The Mother in the Home (Pilgrim, 1917)

=== As Emilie Loring ===
==== Articles and short stories ====
- "Box from Nixon's". Woman's Home Companion, vol. 48, p. 9-10, May 1921. For information on this periodical, see
- "Glycerine tears". The Delineator, vol. 106, p. 8-9, March 1925.

==== Novels (chronological order) ====
| Release date | Title | Publisher(s) |
|---|---|---|
| 1922 | The Trail of Conflict | Penn |
| 1924 | Here Comes the Sun! | Penn |
| 1925 | A Certain Crossroad | Penn |
| 1927 | The Solitary Horseman | Penn |
| 1928 | Gay Courage | Penn |
| 1929 | Swift Water | Penn |
| 1930 | Lighted Windows | Penn |
| 1931 | Fair Tomorrow | Penn |
| 1932 | Uncharted Seas | Penn |
| 1933 | Hilltops Clear | Penn |
| 1934 | We Ride the Gale | Penn |
| 1934 | With Banners | Penn |
| 1935 | It's a Great World! | Penn |
| 1936 | Give Me One Summer | Penn |
| 1937 | As Long As I Live | Penn |
| 1938 | High of Heart | Little, Brown |
| 1938 | Today Is Yours | Little, Brown |
| 1939 | Across the Years | Little, Brown |
| 1940 | There Is Always Love | Little, Brown |
| 1941 | Stars in Your Eyes | Little, Brown |
| 1941 | Where Beauty Dwells | Little, Brown |
| 1942 | Rainbow at Dusk | Little, Brown |
| 1943 | When Hearts are Light Again | Little, Brown |
| 1944 | Keepers of the Faith | Little, Brown |
| 1945 | Beyond the Sound of Guns | Little, Brown |
| 1946 | Bright Skies | Little, Brown |
| 1947 | Beckoning Trails | Little, Brown |
| 1948 | I Hear Adventure Calling | Little, Brown |
| 1949 | Love Came Laughing By | Little, Brown |
| 1950 | To Love and to Honor | Little, Brown |
| 1952 | For All Your Life | Little, Brown |
| 1954 | I Take This Man | Little, Brown |
| 1954 | My Dearest Love | Little, Brown |
| 1955 | The Shadow of Suspicion | Little, Brown |
| 1955 | With This Ring | Little, Brown |
| 1956 | What Then Is Love | Little, Brown |
| 1957 | Look to the Stars | Little, Brown |
| 1958 | Behind the Cloud | Little, Brown |
| 1960 | How Can the Heart Forget? | Little, Brown |
| 1962 | Throw Wide the Door | Little, Brown |
| 1963 | Follow Your Heart | Little, Brown |
| 1964 | A Candle in Her Heart | Little, Brown |
| 1965 | Forever and a Day | Little, Brown |
| 1966 | Spring Always Comes | Little, Brown |
| 1967 | A Key to Many Doors | Little, Brown |
| 1968 | In Times Like These | Little, Brown |
| 1969 | Love with Honor | Little, Brown |
| 1970 | No Time for Love | Little, Brown |
| 1971 | Forsaking All Others | Little, Brown |
| 1972 | The Shining Years | Little, Brown |

==== Play ====
- Where's Peter? (Penn, 1928)
