= Salem Social Library =

The Salem Social Library (1760–1810), also known as the Social Library in Salem, was a proprietary library located in Salem, Massachusetts. Established in 1760, it was one of the earliest lending libraries in the American colonies.

== History ==
In 1760, twenty-eight individuals collectively subscribed 165 guineas to fund the creation of the library. The group commissioned Jeremy Condy, a Boston minister, to purchase books in London. The library officially opened on May 20, 1761, in a brick schoolhouse, with an initial collection of 415 volumes. This collection included both purchased books and additional volumes donated by library members.

Social Library in Salem was a proprietary library in Salem, Massachusetts. "Twenty-eight gentlemen ... subscribed 165 guineas. ... A Boston minister, [Jeremy Condy], was employed to buy the books in London and the library opened in a brick schoolhouse May 20, 1761, with 415 volumes including gifts given by members. The revolution was a bitter blow to many of the gentlemen who had founded the library. Many of the proprietors fled to England. ... In 1784 the library made a new start in new quarters in the new ... schoolhouse. Here they remained about 15 years, the schoolmaster acting as librarian." "In 1797 they became incorporated;" Edward Augustus Holyoke, Jacob Ashton, Joseph Hiller, and Edward Pulling served as signatories. "There were over 40 proprietors when in 1810 the library was turned over to the [Salem] Athenaeum."

== Subscribers ==
- Samuel Barnard
- Thomas Barnard
- Samuel Barton Jr.
- Joseph Blaney
- Joseph Bowditch
- William Browne
- Francis Cabot
- Joseph Cabot
- S. Curwen
- Richard Derby
- William Eppes
- Samuel Gardner
- Samuel Gardner Jr.
- Stephen Higginson
- E.A. Holyoke
- William Jeffry
- Daniel King
- John Nutting Jr.
- A. Oliver Jr.
- Timothy Orne
- Benjamin Pickman
- Benjamin Pickman Jr.
- Ebenezer Putnam
- William Pynchon
- Nathaniel Ropes
- William Vans
- W. Walter

== See also ==
- Salem Athenaeum, successor to the Social Library of Salem
