= George Melville Baker =

American playwright and publisher (1832 – 1890)

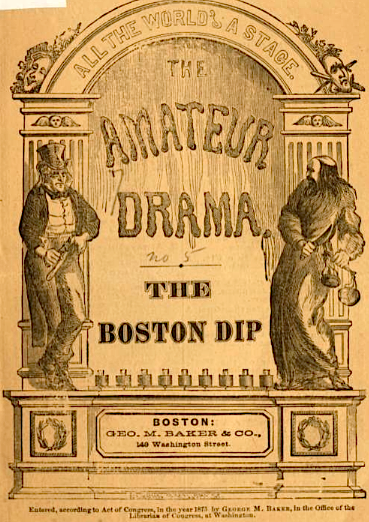
Cover of The Boston Dip written and published by George M. Baker, 1873

George Melville Baker (1832–1890) was a playwright and publisher in Boston, Massachusetts, in the 19th century. He worked for Lee & Shepard publishers, then opened his own imprint. "George M. Baker & Co." issued works by authors such as Henry M. Baker, F.E. Chase, and Herbert Pelham Curtis. Baker's company ceased in 1885, succeeded by his brother's "Walter H. Baker & Co." George Baker also performed with comedian Henry C. Barnabee, appearing in "lyceum entertainments" in New England. He belonged to the Mercantile Library Association. He married Emily Bowles in 1858; children included novelist Emilie Loring, playwright Rachel Baker Gale, and screenwriter Robert Melville Baker.

== Selected Dramatic Works ==
- Bread on the Waters (1866)
- The Duchess of Dublin (1873)- One act farce about an English doctor in Ireland, who acquires customers by claiming to take the non-existent "Duchess of Dublin" as a patient. A vulgar but innocent Irish maid ultimately finds herself playing the part.
- Nevada; or, The Lost Mine
