= William Blagrove =

- Occupations: Bookseller, publisher, librarian
- Known for: Running the Union Circulating Library; publishing "a chaste collection of amatory and miscellaneous songs"; editing The Elements of Chess
- Spouse: Nancy Pelham

William Blagrove was a bookseller, publisher and librarian in Boston, Massachusetts, in the early 19th century. He ran the Union Circulating Library, a subscription library on School Street, from 1804 through 1811. (Note: The "Union Circulating Library" was formerly "Pelham's Circulating Library," overseen by Blagrove's uncle, bookseller William Pelham, ca.1796-1804) (Note: In April 1811 the Library was taken over by Samuel H. Parker) As a publisher, he issued "a chaste collection of amatory and miscellaneous songs, designed chiefly for the ladies" in 1808.

In 1805 his uncle, William Pelham, published The Elements of Chess, "one of the earliest works upon chess published in the United States, and the first of its kind printed at Boston. The editor of this volume — (that the book was edited by some chessplayer at the time of its publication is apparent from an exceedingly interesting appendix, containing much new and original matter) — was undoubtedly a nephew of Mr. Pelham's, named William Blagrove, who is known to have been an enthusiast of chess, and a player of merit."

Blagrove married Nancy Pelham; children included William Pelham (b. 1808).

== See also ==
- List of booksellers in Boston
