= Nathaniel Stone Simpkins =

American politician

Nathaniel Stone Simpkins (Jan. 8, 1796 – June 18, 1887) was a bookseller, publisher, and legislator in Massachusetts in the 19th century. He ran a bookshop and circulating library in Boston ca.1820-1830. "In 1835 he established the Barnstable Journal [of Barnstable, Massachusetts], and in 1856 he established the Yarmouth Register" of Yarmouth, Massachusetts. Simpkins served as a "Representative to the General Court of Mass. in 1836, 1850 and 1851."

He married Eliza Jane Thacher (1803–1836) in ca.1824; and Mary Sears (b. 1807) in 1852. His parents were John Simpkins and Olive Stone of Brewster, Massachusetts. Siblings included Caroline Simpkins, Olive Simpkins (Mrs. John Capen), Elizabeth Simpkins (Mrs. George P. Bangs), John Simpkins, and Boston bookseller Samuel Grant Simpkins.

Simpkins purchased a home on Strawberry Lane in Yarmouth in the 1830s. His descendants sold the home to artist Edward Gorey in 1979. The home, which Gorey named Elephant House, is now open to the public as the Edward Gorey House.

== Suffolk Circulating Library ==
Among the titles available to subscribers of Simpkins' Suffolk Circulating Library in the early 1820s:

- Stephen Burroughs' Memoirs
- D. Campbell's Overland Journaey to India
- Richard Cumberland's Jew of Mogadore, a comic opera
- Daniel Drake's Picture of Cincinnati
- Evans' Pedestrious Tour of 4,000 miles in America
- Catherine Hutton's Welsh Mountaineer
- M. De Genlis' Zuma
- Isabella Kelly's Ruthinglenne
- Miss Leslie's Young Ladies' Mentor
- Marvellous Chronicle, or Magazine of Wonders
- Masonick Melodies
- Theodore Melville's White Knight
- Mirror of the Graces, Advice on Female Accomplishments
- Hannah More's Strictures on Education
- Amelia Opie's Simple Tales
- Paris Spectator, or the Customs of Parisians
- Park's Travels in the Interior of Africa
- Isaac Pocock's Libertine, an opera
- Polyanthos
- President's Tour through the United States
- Thomas Skinner Surr's A Winter in London
- Symzonia, or a Voyage to the Internal World
