= Rachel Baker Gale =

American playwright (1858 – 1923)

Rachel E. Baker Gale (1858–1923) was an American playwright. Gale wrote at least twelve parlor plays in her lifetime, most of which expressed her opposition to the U.S. women's suffrage movement and women taking on public roles. Gale was the second wife of John E. Gale, a prominent banker and businessman in Haverhill, Massachusetts.

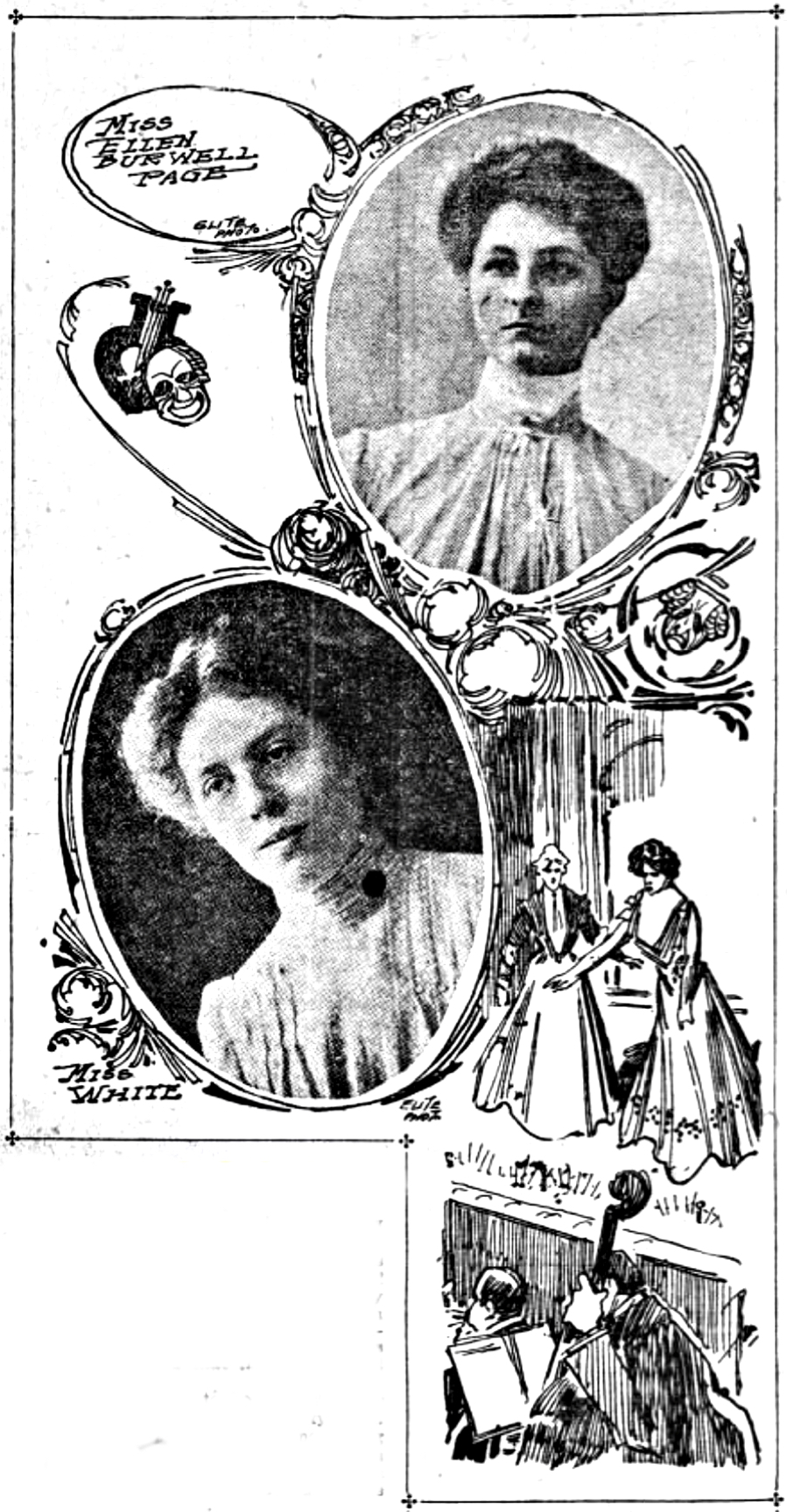
Publicity illustration for The Chaperon by Rachel E. Baker, presented by Girls High School (San Francisco) students in 1902

== Family and early life ==
Gale was born Rachel Elizabeth Baker, to mother Emily F. Baker (née Bowles) and father George Melville Baker in Massachusetts in March, 1858. Her father wrote and published parlor plays, comedy speeches, and other popular forms of entertainment. According to his obituary, George Melville Baker "won his greatest reputation . . . [with] his position as writer to the amateur stage," completing 79 parlor plays in his lifetime. Gale's brother, Robert Melville Baker (c. 1874 – 1929), grew up to publish sensational novels and plays, and wrote the stories for several silent films, including Flirting with Fate (1916), which featured Douglas Fairbanks. Gale's sister was Emilie Baker Loring (1864 – 1951), who achieved fame as a best-selling romance writer, first publishing around age 50, and authoring almost 100 novels over the course of her career.

== Walter H. Baker ==
Her uncle, Walter H. Baker, ran the Walter H. Baker Publishing Company, which published plays, later, by 1925, the Baker International Play Bureau.

== Plays ==
| Title | Year | Notes |
|---|---|---|
| After Taps | 1891 | Co-authored with George Melville Baker; published under Rachel E. Baker |
| The Chaperon | 1891 | Published under Rachel E. Baker |
| A King's Daughter | 1893 | Published under Rachel E. Baker |
| Mr. Bob | 1894 | Published under Rachel E. Baker |
| Her Picture | 1894 | Published under Rachel E. Baker |
| Bachelor Hall | 1898 | Co-authored with Robert Melville Baker |
| No Men Wanted | 1903 | |
| The New Crusade | 1908 | |
| Coats and Petticoats | 1910 | |
| The Clinging Vine | 1913 | |
| Rebellious Jane | 1916 | |
| Wigs on the Green | unpublished | |

Gale's plays are part of a tradition known as ″parlor plays,″ which are written for small groups of amateur performers to produce in their homes. In Amateur Dramas for Parlor Theatricals, Evening Entertainments, and School Exhibitions (1867), George Melville Baker describes parlor plays: "The plots are simple, and easy of comprehension by the most inexperienced amateur. The stage-directions are carefully noted; no scenery is required; the furniture and properties can be readily supplied; and all of the pieces can be represented in the house or exhibition-hall." Although simple in many ways, parlor plays can sometimes offer insights into complex political views, since they often function as propaganda for a particular political position. Gale's plays most often advocate an antisuffrage position.

Gale began publishing in 1891. The first play to be published under her name, After Taps, was actually begun by her father, who left it unfinished upon his death in 1890. She published the play jointly under both their names.

=== Records of performances ===
1898: Bachelor Hall performed at Hale House Benefit 1904: No Men Wanted performed by Winchester High School 1910: "Wigs on the Green," Gale's only known unpublished work, performed in Haverhill, Massachusetts. Notably, Gale starred in this performance, and her brother directed. 1919: Rebellious Jane performed by Wollaston Woman's Club 1923: No Men Wanted performed as radio broadcast by Boston station WGI 1926: The New Crusade performed by Concord Woman's Club

== Later life and marriage ==
Rachel Baker married John E. Gale on September 29, 1896, when she was 38 years old. Already an established playwright at this time, Gale continued to write after her marriage. At the time of their marriage, John E. Gale was the president of Haverhill National Bank in Haverhill, Massachusetts. They did not have any children together, but John Gale had two sons (Herbert and Arthur) with his first wife, Mary B. Gale. The Gales were prominent members of their society, appearing sometimes on society pages that reported their social engagements, such as a 1912 trip to Watch Hill in the Catskills. When John E. Gale died on February 1, 1916, he left Rachel Baker Gale a comfortable fortune of about $850,000 (worth approximately $17.7 million in 2012 dollars.)
