= Edward Augustus Holyoke =

American physician (1728–1829)

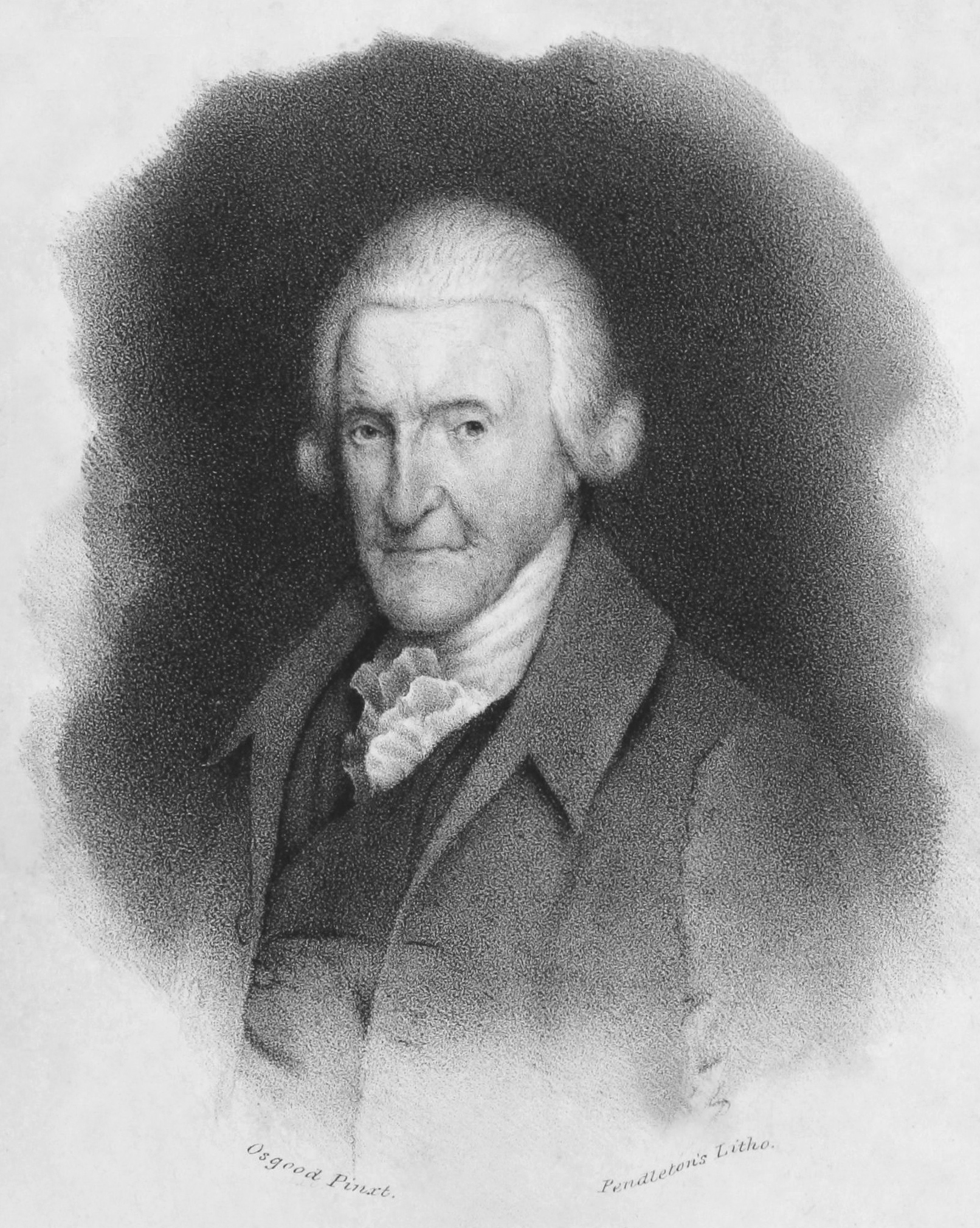
- Holyoke at age 100 (lithograph from a portrait by Charles Osgood, 1829)
- Born: Edward Augustus Holyoke; 1 August 1728; Marblehead, Massachusetts, British America
- Died: 31 March 1829 (aged 100 years, 242 days); Salem, Massachusetts, United States of America
- Occupation: medical doctor

Edward Augustus Holyoke (1 August 1728 – 31 March 1829) was an American educator and medical doctor.

== Biography ==
Edward Augustus was born in Marblehead, Province of Massachusetts Bay, on 1 August 1728. His father was the Reverend Edward Holyoke, a former president of Harvard. Edward Augustus himself graduated from Harvard in 1746. He opened a medical practice in 1748 and practiced for 73 more years until retiring in 1821. In 1768 he was elected to the American Philosophical Society as a member. He died in Salem, Massachusetts in 1829 at the age of 100, surpassing the average life expectancy at the time by fifty years.

Holyoke was a charter member of the American Academy of Arts and Sciences and the president of the organization from 1814 to 1820. He was also a founder of the Massachusetts Medical Society. He served as the president of the society from 1782 to 1784 and from 1786 to 1788. The length of his service to the medical practice and his pioneering work in the advancement of smallpox vaccinations have been acknowledged.
