= William Pelham (bookseller) =

William Pelham (1759–1827) was a bookseller and publisher in Boston, Massachusetts, in the late 18th and early 19th centuries. He kept a shop and circulating subscription library at no.59 Cornhill, 1796–1810.

== Biography ==
Pelham was born in Williamsburg, Virginia in 1759, to Peter Pelham Jr. and Ann Creese. William's grandfather was Peter Pelham, the Boston artist.

William Pelham was working in the book trade in Boston by the 1790s. "In the Independent Chronicle for July 7, 1796, Pelham offered for sale new books and 'an uncommonly fine proof of Mr. Copley's celebrated plate of the Death of Chatham.'"

In his bookshop Pelham also operated a circulating library. The 1801 catalog of Pelham's Circulating Library included several hundred titles, including, for example:

- Adela Northington
- Belmont Grove; or the discovery
- Belleville Lodge; a novel
- Female Jockey Club
- Hackney Coach; a sentimental miscellany
- Hive; or repository of sententious essays
- Inside View of the Prisons of Paris
- Hawkins' Letters on the Female Mind
- Looker-On; a periodical work
- Management of the Tongue
- Manual of Liberty
- Mirabeau's Gallery of Portraits
- Mavor's Collection of Voyages and Travels
- Museum of Agreeable Entertainment
- New Foundling Hospital for Wit
- Parker's View of High, and Low Life
- Peruvian Letters
- Reign of George VI Anticipated
- Tooke's Pantheon of the Heathen Deities
- Trimmer's Introduction to the Knowledge of Nature
- Mortimer's Universal Director
- Universal Story-Teller

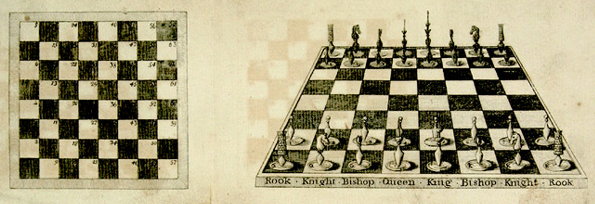
Fold-out illustration from Elements of Chess published by Pelham in 1805

Pelham's nephew William Blagrove took over the library in 1804, moving it to School Street, and continuing to oversee the enterprise until 1811.

In 1805 Pelham published The Elements of Chess, "one of the earliest works upon chess published in the United States, and the first of its kind printed at Boston. The editor of this volume — (that the book was edited by some chessplayer at the time of its publication is apparent from an exceedingly interesting appendix, containing much new and original matter) — was undoubtedly a nephew of Mr. Pelham's, named William Blagrove, who is known to have been an enthusiast of chess, and a player of merit."

In 1808 he wrote and published A System of Notation, a pronunciation manual for English language. It incorporated "a new edition of a popular English novel, for the purpose of introducing A New System Of Notation; by which the variable sounds of the vowels and consonants in the English alphabet may be accurately distinguished. The irregularity of sound to which many of our alphabetical characters are subject, has been frequently noticed and complained of: more especially by foreigners engaged in learning the language. ... The marks denoting sounds will be on the left hand page; the right hand page will contain the same matter, word for word, the marks of sound being omitted, and the accent distinguished."

From his aunt Sarah Creese, Pelham inherited "the estate, no.59 Cornhill, [in Boston], which her uncle, Rev. Wm. Price had given King's Chapel. ... In 1813 the wardens of King's Chapel sued Pelham and recovered the estate from him."

Some time after 1810 he moved to Zanesville, Ohio. He died in New Harmony, Indiana, in 1827.
