= Levina =

Levina may refer to:

- Feminine form of the surname Levin
- Levina Buoncuore Urbino, American writer and translator
- Levina (singer) (born 1991), German singer, born Isabella Lueen
- Levina Teerlinc, Flemish miniaturist
- Levina (Verkh-Invenskoye Rural Settlement), Kudymkarsky District, Perm Krai, Russia
- Levina (Yogvinskoye Rural Settlement), Kudymkarsky District, Perm Krai, village in Russia
- MV Levina 1, an Indonesian passenger ferry

== See also ==
- Levin (disambiguation)
