= The Alligator's Toothache =

1962 children's picture book by Marguerite Dorian

First edition

The Alligator's Toothache is a 1962 children's picture book written and illustrated by Marguerite Dorian. It tells the tale of an alligator called Alli and his experiences with a painful tooth and a dentist's surgery. It was published by Lothrop, Lee & Shepard.

== Plot synopsis ==
The book tells the story of an alligator named Alli, who lives at the zoo. One morning Alli wakes up with a terrible toothache, and feels miserable. His fellow zoo-animal friends offer well-meaning but non-productive suggestions regarding the toothache, and the zookeeper has nothing in his veterinary supplies to help Alli's pain. So Alli is obliged to catch a city bus to see the dentist, a trip he abhors because he fears that the dentist may be a cruel, sadistic monster whose operation will be even more painful than his toothache. But having never traveled alone before, Alli unknowingly boards the wrong bus, and thus is on his way to an entirely wrong part of the city. His initial mistake turns out to be a stroke of incredibly good luck, however --- while riding the bus through its assigned route, Alli meets a friendly little boy on the bus who is also traveling the same way, and he soon discovers that the lad is, in fact, the dentist's young son! Encouraged by the kind boy's earnest reassurances that his father is, in fact, a kind, caring knowledgeable man, and by his promise to accompany Alli to the dentist's office and hold his hand throughout the operation, Alli at last musters the courage to make the trip to the dentist's office, where he learns, to his great surprise and delight, that his toothache was caused by nothing more than a wisdom tooth that had started to grow in.

== Reception ==
Kathleen Martin praised both the dialogues and drawings, saying the book "shows the exceptional talents of Marguerite Dorian." Martin, who reviewed the book at its time of release, highlighted the "natural conversations" between the main characters, as well as the author's choice of "greens and reds". Kirkus Reviews stated "The outlandish idea of a cowardly alligator with a toothache will buttress the courage of his human counterparts on future dental safaris." while another review found that "Although the story seems over-extended, it has occasional bits of humor and warmth; the writing has a pleasant simplicity, but the plot and its development are very weak."
