= Sampson R. Urbino =

Book dealer, publisher, and library owner

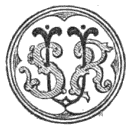
Emblem of S.R. Urbino, publisher, Boston, 1870

Sampson R. Urbino (1818–1896), also known as S.R. Urbino, was a book dealer, publisher, and library owner in Boston, Massachusetts, in the 19th century. He focused on books in languages other than English.

Prior to bookselling, Urbino worked as a teacher in Boston. In the mid-1850s he bought "Miss Elizabeth P. Peabody's circulating library and book-store on West Street. He developed the library and also added German, French, and books in other foreign languages to his stock. He then ... began publishing the well-known series of Ahn's and Ollendorf's readers and grammars, and other text-books." The business operated from an office on Summer Street (ca.1856) Winter Street (ca.1857-1861) School Street (ca.1864-1865) and Bromfield Street (ca.1870).

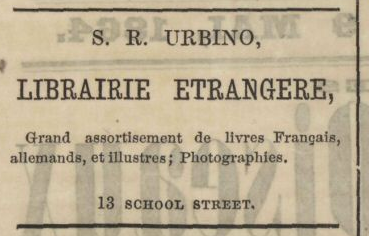
Advertisement for S.R. Urbino, School Street, Boston, 1864

Urbino sold part of his textbook enterprise "to Henry Holt & Co. shortly before retiring from business in 1865. He sold his business to De Vries, Ibarra & Co., to whom he also transferred the services of Mr. Carl Schoenhof and Miss Fanny Moeller."

He supported the Free Soil Party; the 20th Massachusetts Volunteer Infantry during the Civil War; and the National Liberal League. He belonged to the American Association for the Promotion of Social Science. In 1889 "S.R. Urbino and 30 others" presented a petition to the Massachusetts House of Representatives asking for "legislation providing that one-third of the members of school committees in cities and towns shall be women."

Urbino lived in Roxbury and Newton, Massachusetts, and was married to Levina Buoncuore Urbino, a writer and translator.

== See also ==
- List of booksellers in Boston

== Published by S.R. Urbino ==
- L. Boncoeur [i.e. Levina Buoncuore Urbino]. L'instructeur de l'enfrance: (A first book for children), 2nd ed. 1864
- Goethe. Faust, Eine Tragoedie von Goethe: Erster Theil. With English notes. 1864.
- Goethe, E.C.F. Krauss. Iphigenie auf Tauris. With English notes. 1865.
- Goethe, E.C.F. Krauss. Hermann und Dorothea. With English notes. 1866.
- Explanatory text to S.R. Urbino's charts of the animal kingdom. 1869. "Revised and corrected by Samuel Kneeland" Google books
- L.B. Cuore [i.e. Levina Buoncuore Urbino]. Italian conversation-grammar, 5th ed. 1870 Google books
- Emil Otto. German conversation-grammar, 21st ed. 1870.
- M. Lamé Fleury; translated by Susan M. Lane. Ancient history told to children. 1870 Google books
- Eugénie Foa. Le petit Robinson de Paris, 4th ed. 1870
