= Goodwill Industries =

American business (founded 1902)

Goodwill Industries International Inc.
- Founded: 1902; 124 years ago, in Boston, Massachusetts, U.S.
- Founder: The Reverend Edgar J. Helms
- Tax ID no.: 53-0196517
- Purpose: Vocational rehabilitation for disabled persons
- Headquarters: 15810 Indianola Drive; Derwood, Maryland (Rockville mailing address) 20855; United States
- Number of locations: 4,245 thrift stores (2021)
- Region served: 14 countries
- Products: Retail, secondhand merchandise
- Key people: Steven C. Preston (president & CEO)
- Revenue: US$7.4 billion (2022)
- Website: www.goodwill.org

Goodwill Industries International Inc., or simply Goodwill, is an American 501(c)(3) non-profit organization that provides job training, employment placement services, and other community-based programs for people who face barriers to employment.

Goodwill Industries also hires veterans and individuals who lack job experience, an education, or face employment challenges. The business is funded by a network of 3,200+ retail thrift stores, operating as independent stores. Goodwill Industries operates as a network of independent, community-based organizations in Brazil, Canada, Costa Rica, Finland, Italy, South Korea, Mexico, the Philippines, Taiwan, Thailand, Trinidad and Tobago, the United States, Uruguay and Venezuela, with 165 local Goodwill retail stores in the United States and Canada. It slowly expanded from its founding in 1902 and was first called Goodwill in 1915. In 2024, the group served more than 2.1 million people, with more than 142,000 people placed into employment. In their 2024 fiscal year, Goodwill organizations recorded $8.6 billion in revenue and $8.1 billion in expenses, of which $6.2 billion was spent on charitable services and $1.9 billion was spent on salaries and other operating expenses. Services constituted 77 percent of expenses. Goodwill Industries logo is a stylized letter g, resembling a smiling face, designed by Joseph Selame in 1968.

== Retail history ==
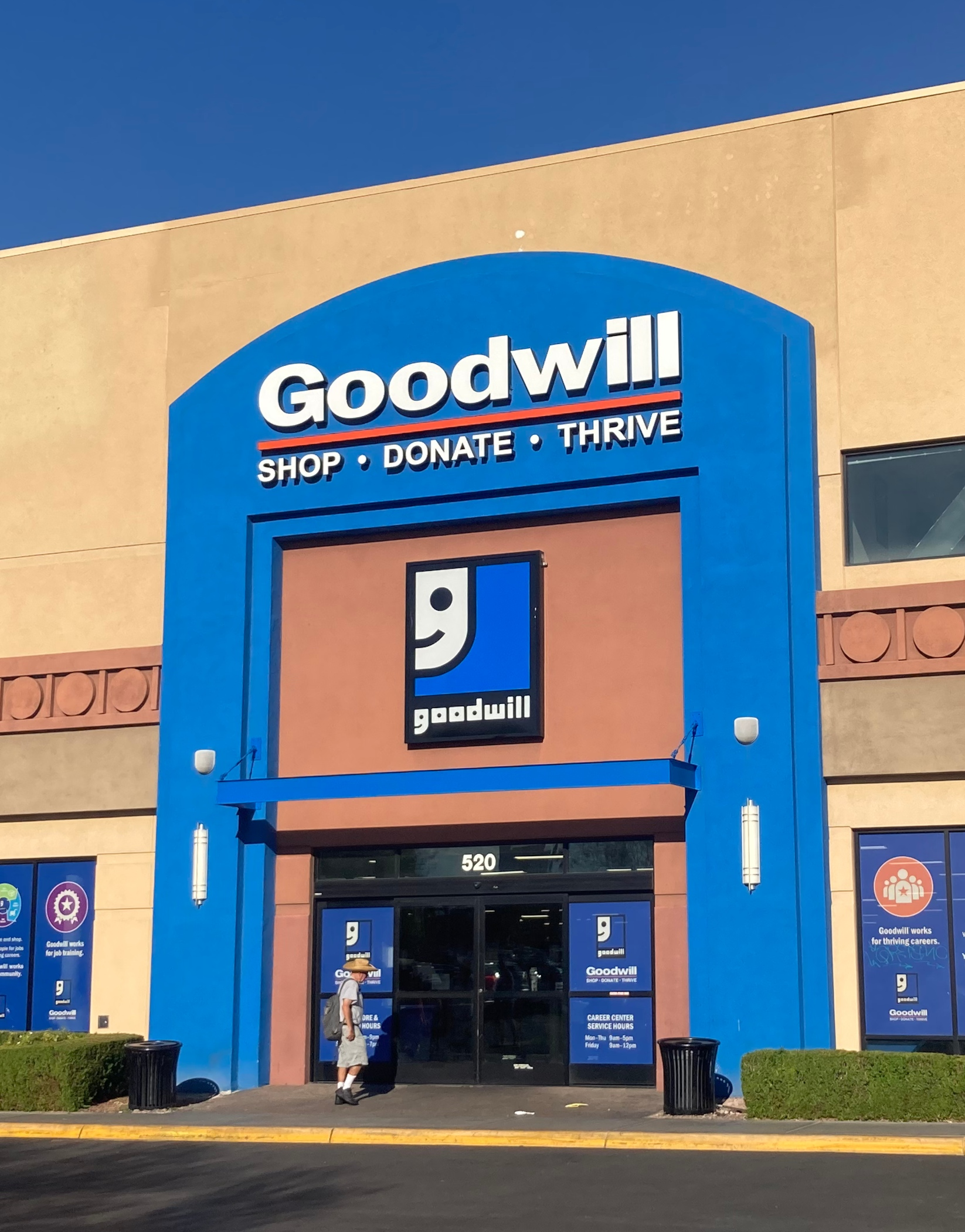
A Goodwill store in Las Vegas

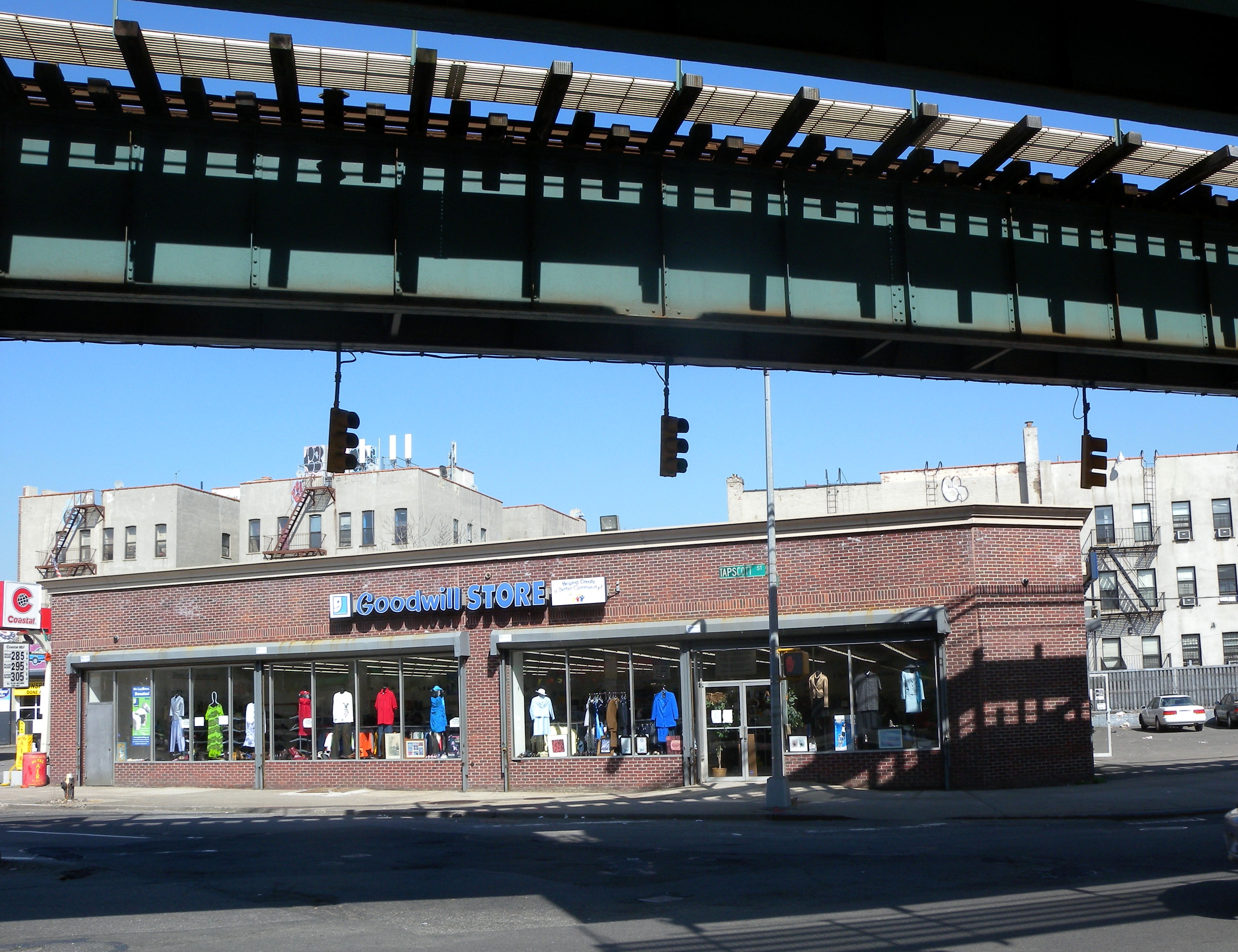
A Goodwill in Brooklyn

In 1902, the Reverend Edgar J. Helms of Morgan Methodist Chapel in Boston started a business called Morgan Memorial as part of his Christian ministry. Helms and his congregation collected used or discarded household goods and clothing from wealthier areas of the city, then trained and hired the unemployed or impoverished to mend and repair them. The products were then redistributed to those in need or kept by those who helped repair them. In 1915, Helms had representatives of a workshop mission in Brooklyn, NY visit the facility so they could learn the innovative programs and operating techniques of the company. Helms was subsequently invited to visit the representatives’ facility. Out of these exchanges came Brooklyn's willingness to adopt and adapt the Morgan Memorial's way of doing things, while Helms was persuaded that "Goodwill Industries”, the name for Brooklyn's workshop, was preferable to the Morgan Memorial name. Morgan Memorial Goodwill Industries was created. Along with Brooklyn's interest and ties, this became the foundation on which Goodwill Industries was to be built as an international movement. Goodwill has become an international nonprofit organization that, as of 2016, takes in more than $4.8 billion in annual revenue and provides more than 300,000 people with job training and community services each year. In 1999, George Kessinger, the head of Goodwill of Orange County during this time, started shopgoodwill.org.

== Operations ==
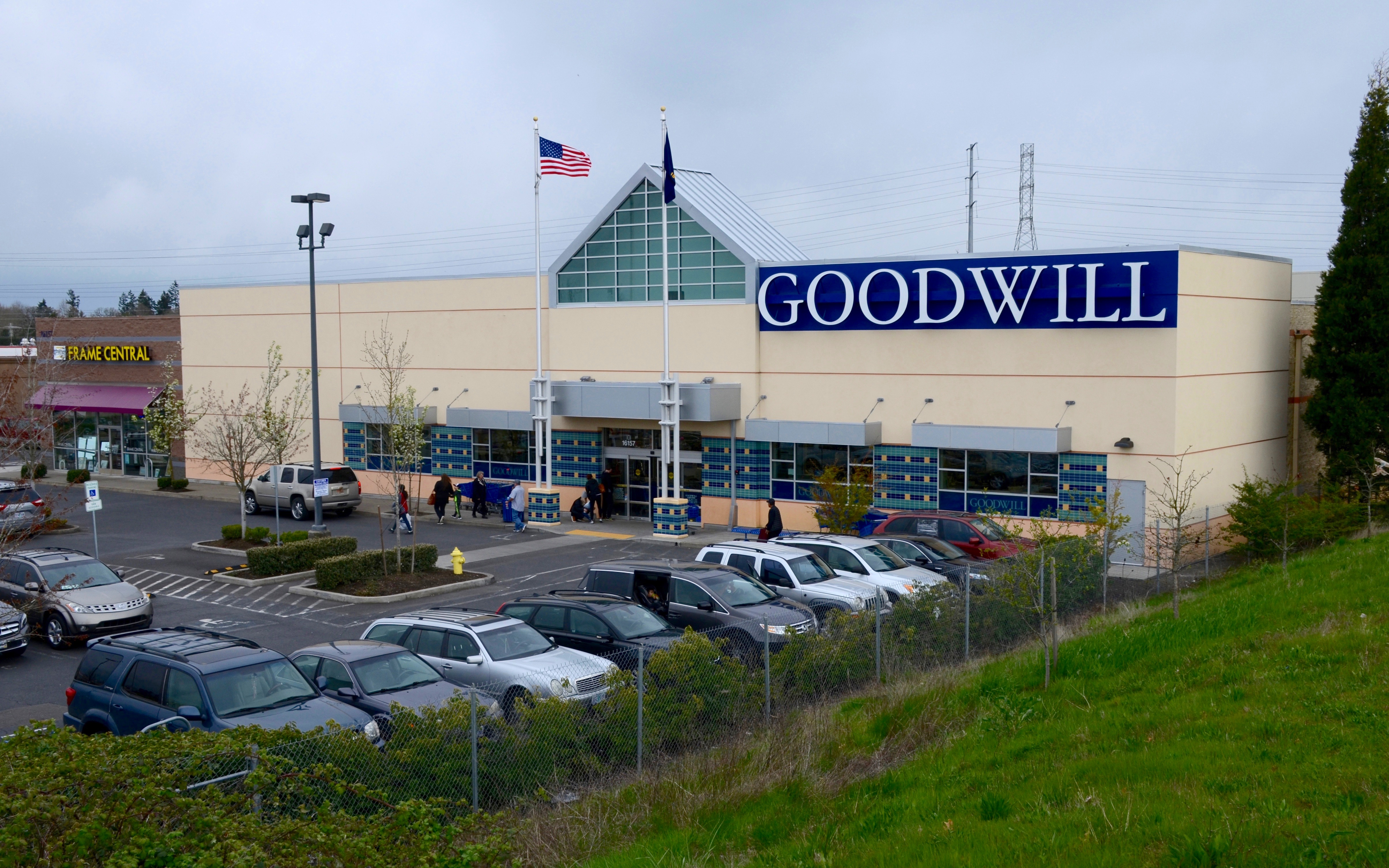
A Goodwill store in Oregon (2017)

As of July 2011, there are 164 full Goodwill members in the United States and Canada. By 2006, Goodwill Industries International had a network of 207 member organizations in the United States, Canada, and 23 other countries. These are each independent social enterprises that operate their own regional Goodwill retail stores and job training programs. Morgan Memorial Goodwill Industries, Boston, is the enterprise operated in Boston, where Goodwill was founded.

The clothing and household goods donated to Goodwill are sold in more than 3,200 Goodwill retail stores, on its Internet auction site shopgoodwill.com, and eBay by a number of its regional stores. The largest Goodwill store is in Seattle, spanning 70,000 square feet (6,500 m^{2}), and operated by Evergreen Goodwill, which as 22 locations in Western Washington.

When merchandise cannot be sold at a normal Goodwill store, it is taken to a "Goodwill Outlet" or "Bargain Store" where items are mostly sold by weight, with prices ranging from about $0.49 to $1.89 per pound, depending on the location. The wide selection and massive discounts on a variety of household goods typically attract a fervent following of regular customers, some of whom make a full-time living buying and re-selling goods. Many vendors buy this merchandise in bulk and send the merchandise to third-world countries.

In January 2016, Goodwill Industries of Toronto, Eastern, Central, and Northern Ontario closed its 16 stores and 10 donation centres after 80 years of operations, citing cash problems. The six other Canadian Goodwill Industries Branches remain operational.

In 2019, Goodwill Industries of Northern Michigan announced that it would receive a $1.25 million grant fund from the Amazon CEO's Day One Families Fund.

In May 2022, Goodwill Industries International announced a $12 million investment in their Digital Career Accelerator. The donation made by Google.org of $7 million in direct grants and $7 million in search ads on Google aims to reach more than 2,000,000 people across the U.S. and Canada through infrastructure expansion to aid the development of digital skills and career training.

=== GoodwillFinds ===
In 2022, a consortium of local Goodwill organizations from across the US founded a new venture, launching in October 2022 the first nation-wide, centrally-managed online marketplace, GoodwillFinds.com, a site that allowed consumers to purchase donated items from across the country in a single, branded, fixed-price, modern shopping experience. Matthew A. Kaness, a seasoned retail veteran, was hired to lead the venture, oversee its launch, and expand the new platform. While many Goodwill member stores had previously sold some donations online, Goodwill was limited to in-store purchases, auction sites, or online stores like eBay and Amazon.

GoodwillFinds was a separate entity from Goodwill Industries International, but was a non-profit organization and shared the same mission as Goodwill. The online store was expected to raise awareness of the Goodwill brand to a new generation of shoppers, bringing in more donations as well as customers to participating Goodwills across the US.

GoodwillFinds closed in 2025.

=== Helms College and Edgar's Hospitality Group ===
In 2021, MacKenzie Scott donated $10 million to Goodwill Industries of Middle Georgia (GIMG), the only Goodwill having an accredited vocational college: Helms College. The college and academic programs offer certificates, diplomas, and degrees in culinary arts, industrial trades, and medical services; it uses the restaurants within Edgar's Hospitality Group as applied learning venues for its culinary students. It is named after Edgar Helms, founder of Goodwill. GIMG is the only Goodwill in the world operating a college and hospitality venue to serve the mission.

GIMG also dealt with former CFO Tim Ligon stealing $75,000 from the organization.

=== Castro pop-up ===
In November 2010, for the first time, Goodwill opened a store in San Francisco, California, intended to hire employees who are transgender, gay, or lesbian. The temporary or "pop-up" store was a unique partnership between Goodwill of San Francisco and the Transgender Economic Empowerment Initiative. The Castro Pop-up store closed in April 2011, and staff were transferred to Goodwill stores throughout the San Francisco area.

=== Women Veterans initiative ===
In June 2013, Goodwill announced an initiative with the goal of engaging 3,000 women veterans as the organization helps them find jobs over the next two years. With this initiative, Goodwill aimed to provide services and support that lead to economic self-sufficiency.

=== Evening of Treasures ===
Goodwill Industries of Greater New York holds an annual charity gala with many fashionable attendees and participants. The 2023 Evening of Treasures gala included Jenna Lyons as hostess, and Tommy Hilfiger, Todd Snyder, and Willy Chavarria, as participants. Designers executed upcycled looks using Goodwill thrift finds.

=== Goodwill Donation Xpress ===
Goodwill operates Donation Xpress locations that comprise a small kiosk that allows patrons to drive in to drop off donations, which are loaded onto trucks and sent to full retail locations.

=== Rewind ===
In September 2026, Goodwill opened their first Rewind record shop in Matthews, North Carolina. The location specializes in vinyl records, CDs, DVDs, audio equipment, game systems, and music apparel.

== Donation policies ==
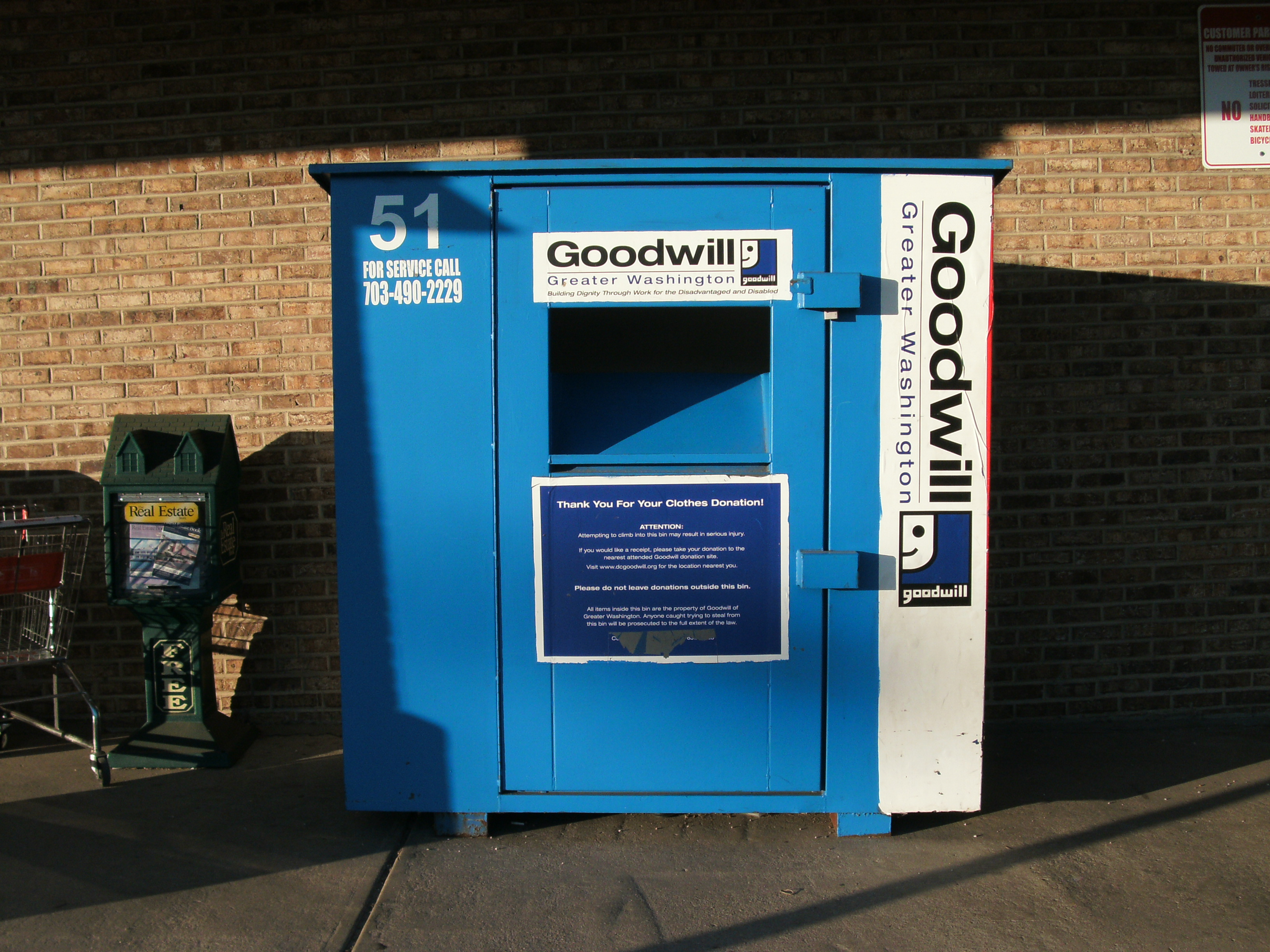
Goodwill donation bin at a Safeway store in Fairfax County, Virginia

Goodwill has policies on donations, including items that it can accept. It will only accept items that can be resold, whether in the retail stores, online, or as bulk lots.

Goodwill stores generally do not accept donations such as automotive parts, furniture showing signs of damage, large appliances including stoves, refrigerators, washers/dryers, or exercise equipment. Most stores also do not accept hazardous materials such as paint, medications, or building materials such as doors, wood, nails, etc. For liability reasons, Goodwill generally does not accept baby cribs or car seats. Sanitary regulations prohibit accepting mattress donations, and although some Goodwill stores sell brand new mattresses, most locations are unable. Because of safety concerns, particularly lead content in painted products, some Goodwill stores do not accept certain toys.

The donations made to Goodwill divert about 4.6 billion pounds of reusable goods from landfills every year.

== Criticism and compensation ==
=== Executive compensation ===
In 2005, Goodwill Industries of the Columbia Willamette (GICW), Goodwill's Portland, Oregon, branch, came under scrutiny due to executive compensation that the Oregon attorney general's office concluded was "unreasonable". The President of the Portland branch, Michael Miller, received $838,508 in pay and benefits for fiscal year 2004, which was reportedly out of line in comparison to other charity executives and placed him in the top one percent of American wage earners. After being confronted with the state's findings, Miller agreed to a 24% reduction in pay, and GICW formed a new committee and policy for handling matters of employee compensation.

A 2013 article on Watchdog.org reported that Goodwill's tax returns showed that more than 100 Goodwills pay less than minimum wage while simultaneously paying more than $53.7 million in total compensation to top executives. Douglas Barr, former CEO of the Goodwill of Southern California, was the highest paid Goodwill executive in the country. He received total compensation worth $1,188,733, including a base salary of $350,200, bonuses worth $87,550, retirement benefits of $71,050, and $637,864 in deferred compensation, after 17 years as CEO. This has been incorrectly cited as his salary.

In 2016, an investigation by the Omaha World-Herald found that executives managing its local Goodwill stores received salaries of up to $400,000 with its CEO, Frank McGree, also collecting a 2014 bonus of $519,000—while over 100 of his store workers were paid less than minimum wage. The investigation found that 14 executives (including the CEO's daughter) were paid more than $100,000, while only $557,000 of the enterprise's $4,000,000 revenue went to "programs" for the disabled. Despite the organization claiming its profits were to assist the disabled acquire job opportunities, the paper's investigators determined that, between 2011 and 2015, none of the store revenues supported job programs. Responding to the World's investigation, Nebraska Attorney General Doug Peterson conducted an official investigation, finding that McGree's salary was "excessive", and concluded that there had become "no correlation at all" between what the area's Goodwill's executives were paid and how the organization was performing its true mission. However, Peterson concluded no laws had been broken that he could charge; instead, he urged the state legislature to enact oversight reforms to the regulation of non-profits.

In 2018, CEO Rich Cantz of Goodwill Northern New England (NNE) released a video statement addressing false "Think Before You Donate" rumors that alleged owner Mark Curran profited $2.3 million a year from the organization, and no money was going to charity. In the statement, he said that Goodwill NNE does give to charities and works to provide resources for brain injury rehabilitation centers, those with disabilities, and veterans seeking work. Further, the website states that "Mark Curran" is neither the owner nor CEO. As of 2020, Steven Preston is the CEO of Goodwill Industries International and reports to a volunteer board of directors. In 2020, the stores in New England were still running a voiceover during shopping hours that reiterated this message to shoppers. The claims appeared in a longer email covering several for-profit and non-profit organizations, which was also debunked by Snopes.

=== Workers' wages ===
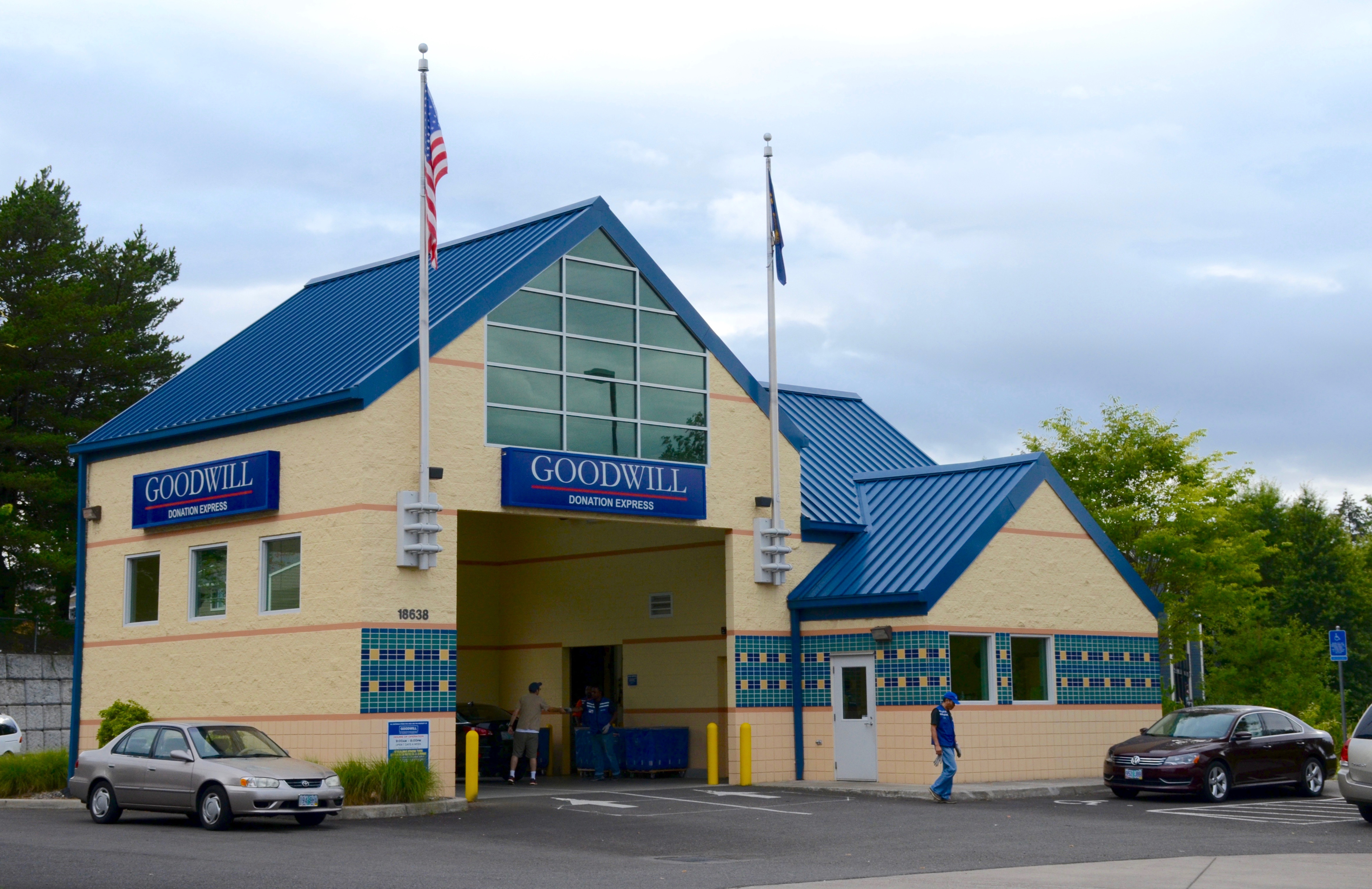
Goodwill donation center in Hillsboro, Oregon

Goodwill Industries International has been criticized for using a provision of federal labor law to pay workers with disabilities less than the federal minimum wage. Under Section 14(c) of the Fair Labor Standards Act of 1938, organizations can obtain a "special wage certificate" to pay workers with disabilities a commensurate wage based on performance evaluations. Of Goodwill's 105,000 employees in 2013, 7,300 were paid under the special wage certificate program. The National Federation of the Blind regarded it "unfair, discriminatory, and immoral". Other disability rights advocates have defended Goodwill's use of the special wage certificate to employ workers with disabilities. Terry Farmer, CEO of ACCSES, a trade group that calls itself the "voice of disability service providers", said scrapping the provision could "force [disabled workers] to stay at home", enter rehabilitation, "or otherwise engage in unproductive and unsatisfactory activities". Goodwill believes that the policy is "a tool to create employment for people with disabilities" who would not otherwise be employed. Goodwill stated that "Eliminating it would remove an important tool for employers and an employment option available to people with severe disabilities and their families. Without the law, many people with disabilities could lose their jobs." Goodwill urged Congress to "support legislation that would strengthen the FLSA and increase its enforcement", and to "preserve opportunities for people with disabilities who would otherwise lose the chance to realize the many tangible and intangible benefits of work". A 2013 FLSA fact sheet from Goodwill stated that "Without FLSA Section 14(c), many more people with severe disabilities would experience difficulty in participating in the workforce. These jobs provide individuals with paychecks that they would be unlikely to receive otherwise, as well as ongoing services and support, job security, and the opportunity for career advancement." Goodwill updated this policy as of June 1, 2024, and only 9 out of 149 local Goodwills in the US still issued the certificates. The goal is to, "transition people with disabilities employed under the special minimum wage certificate into competitive integrated employment."

=== Lobbying ===
A coalition of smaller charities in California complained about Goodwill's support for legislation encouraging greater regulation of donation boxes, calling the efforts an "attempt to corner the clothing donation market and make more money". Local Goodwills argued that other donation boxes divert money from the community and contribute to blight, and pushed for state legislation that requires owners of a donation box to clearly display information about whether it is a for-profit or nonprofit organization.

=== Other controversies ===
In another instance, California Goodwill locations were used for embezzlement. In 1998, an embezzlement ring perpetrated by store managers, stole from $1.5 million to $15 million in cash and donated goods. This led to Vice President Robert Sasson resigning. A former Goodwill General Manager Carol Marrs, committed suicide by firearm in 1997 after a search by law enforcement officers.
