= De Vries, Ibarra & Co. =

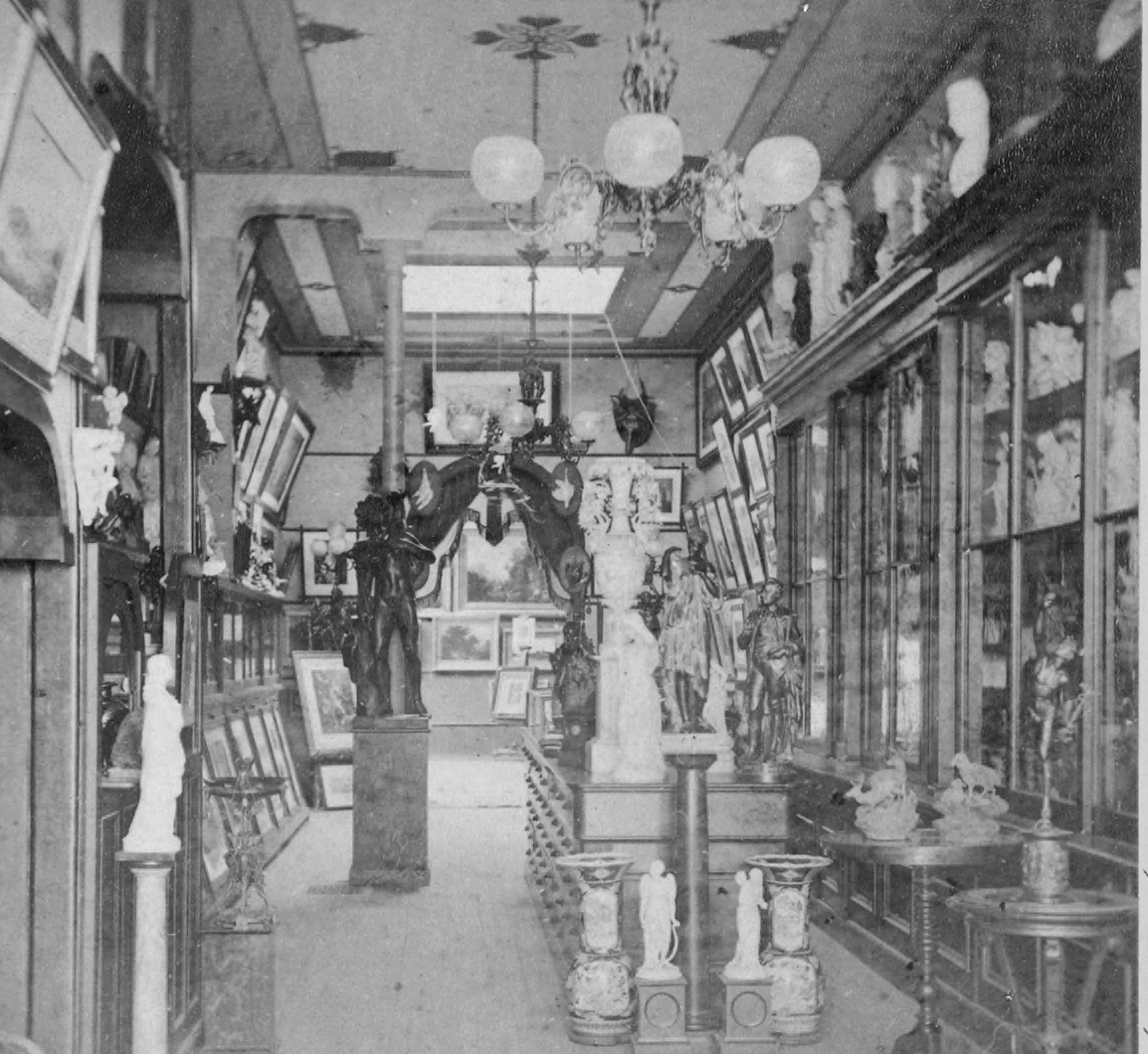
- DeVries Art Gallery, no.145 Tremont St., Boston, 19th century
- Industry: Import, publishing
- Founded: 1864 in Boston, United States
- Founder: Guy Horvath De Vries
- Defunct: 1870
- Fate: Acquired by Carl Schoenhof
- Successor: Schoenhof & Moeller
- Headquarters: Boston, United States

De Vries, Ibarra & Co. (c. 1864-1870) were "importers of paintings, engravings, bronzes, and works of art in general," "publishers of busts and statuary," and "importers and publishers of books in foreign languages." Based in Boston, Massachusetts, in the 1860s the firm kept a shop in the Albion Hotel building on Beacon Street (corner Tremont Street), and later on Tremont Street (between West Street and Temple Place). Proprietors included Guy Horvath De Vries and Mrs. De Vries. Staff included Carl Schoenhof, who bought the firm in 1870.

== History ==
In the 1860s the firm published foreign-language materials including instruction manuals and reprints of literary works by Hans Christian Andersen, Francesco Dall'Ongaro, Gustav zu Putlitz, Carl Theodor Körner and others; translations of literary works (such as Dante's Inferno); and some English-language works. In 1864, for instance, "Messrs. De Vries and Ibarra, in the Albion building, are issuing a series of charming little German books, in a most tasteful style of print, chiefly for the use of young ladies who have German lessons, but attractive to all friends of German literature. Among them is "Prinzessin Ilse," an exquisite Madchen of the Hara mountains; "Was sich der Wald erzahlt," by Putlitz; and now a couple of art essays, on the "Venus of Milo," and on "Rafael and Michael Angelo," by Hermann Grimm, the author of the "Life of Michael Angelo," and son of one of the famous brothers Grimm. ... These little books are cheap, as well as models of artistic print." Around 1865 the firm acquired the business of recently retired bookseller S.R. Urbino.

Among the artworks exhibited in the De Vries Art Gallery were T.S. Noble's painting "John Brown's Blessing" (1867), Albert Bierstadt's "Mt. Vesuvius in Eruption" (1868), and T. Buchanan Read's "Sheridan's Ride." The gallery was favorably mentioned in the Boston Ladies' Repository of April 1867: "At De Vries' art gallery are some fine paintings by artists of eminence, both native and foreign. The largest, and the one now on exhibition, is by Gustave Paul Dore ... entitled 'Midsummer,' and represents many flowers familiar to us. A scythe is lying amid the tall grass and weeds, and near it the flowers and grass lately cut and apparently withering. We notice several other pictures of peculiar interest. Among them a picture by Antonio Cortez, a pupil of Rosa Bonheur, one winter scene of singular fidelity to nature; also one called 'The Young Cooks.' The marbles are also fine ... 'The Dream of Youth' by Miss Ann Whitney is excellent."

After the death of G.H. De Vries in 1870, the firm continued for some time, and then was acquired by Carl Schoenhof, one of the firm's employees. Schoenhof had been "a clerk with De Vries Ibarra & Co., and in 1870 with a Miss [Fanny] Moeller took over the business under the firm name of Schoenhof & Moeller."

== Image gallery ==
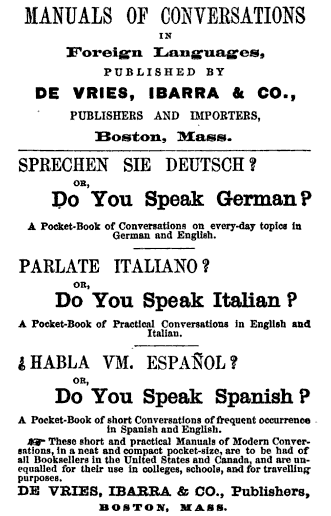
Advertisement, 1864

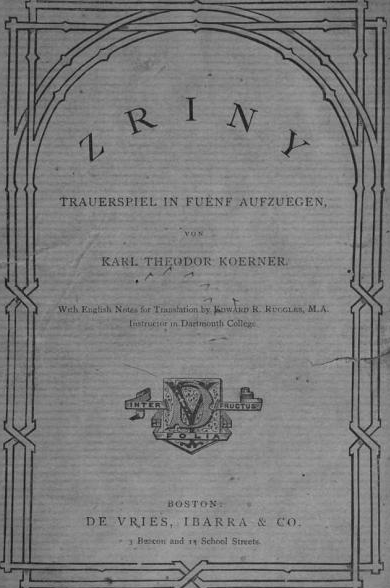
Koerner's "Zriny", 1866

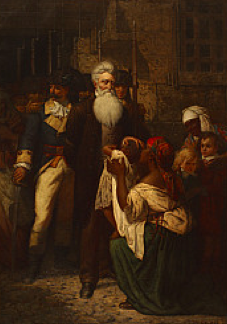
Noble's "John Brown's Blessing"; exhibited 1867 (New York Historical Society)

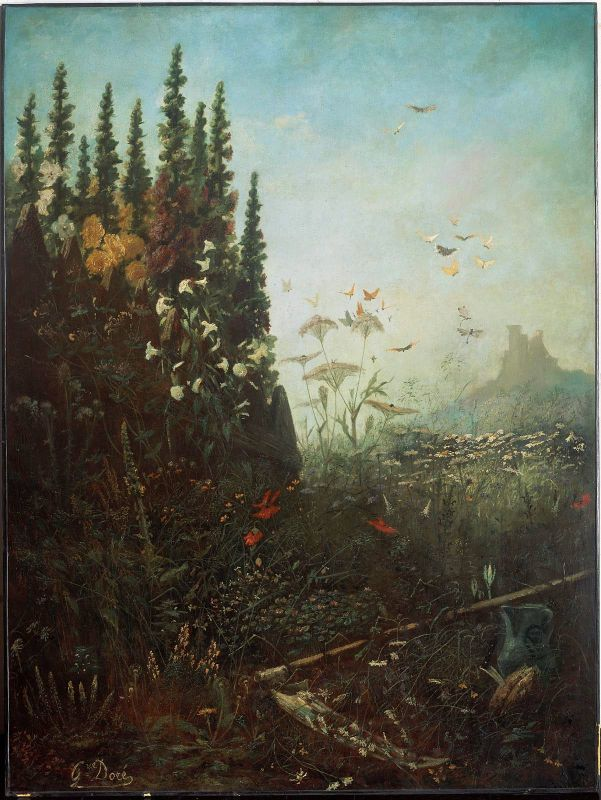
"Summer" by Dore; exhibited 1867 (Museum of Fine Arts, Boston)

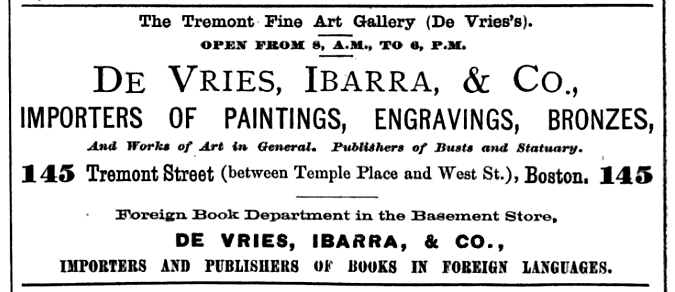
Advertisement, 1868

== Published by De Vries, Ibarra & Co. ==
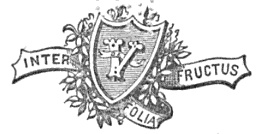
Emblem, 1864

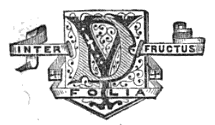
Emblem, 1865

- Parlez-vous franc̜ais?: or, do you speak French?; a pocket companion for beginners who wish to acquire the facility of expressing themselves fluently on every-day topics in a short, easy, and practical way; with hints on French pronunciation. 1864. Google books
- Hans Christian Andersen. Bilderbuch ohne bilder. Boston: De Vries, Ibarra und Compagnie, 1864. Google books
- Reynard the Fox: A burlesque poem from the low-German original of the 15th century. 1865. Internet Archive
- Francesco Dall'Ongaro. La rosa dell' Alpi: novella. 1865
- Alberto Nota. La fièra: commedia in cinque atti. Boston: De Vries, Ibarra e Compangnia, no.3 Beacon Street, 1865. Google books
- Parlate italiano? or Do you speak Italian?: A pocket companion for beginners who wish to acquire the facility of expressing themselves fluently on every-day topics in a short, easy and practical way. 1865. Google books
- Sprechen Sie Deutsch?: or, Do you speak German? A pocket companion for beginners who wish to acquire the facility of expressing themselves fluently on every-day topics in a short, easy, and practical way. With hints on German pronunciation. 4th ed. 1865
- Carl Theodor Körner. Zriny: Ein Trauerspiel. 1866. Intro and notes by Edward Rush Ruggles. Google books
- Dante Alighieri. The first canticle, Inferno, of the Divine Comedy. 1867. Thomas William Parsons, translator. Illustrated by G. Dore. Google books.
- Auguste Carlier. Marriage in the United States. 1867 Google books
- M. Gibert. A French pronouncing grammar for young students: With a vocabulary of the names of familiar objects and conversational phrases. 1868. Google books

=== Exhibition catalogs ===
- Catalogue of Rare and Classical Line Engravings, Etchings and Wood-cuts, Comprising the Best Examples of Every Eminent Engraver, from the Earliest Period to the Present Time. With a Description of the State and Condition of Each Print, and References and Notes from Dumesnil, Bartsch, Nagler, Blanc, Passavant, Weigel, Bryant, Siret, Winckelman, and Catalogues of Celebrated Sales. 1867.
- De Vries Art Gallery. Season of 1867. Fourth Exhibition.
- De Vries' Art Gallery. Season of 1867. Fifth Exhibition. Catalogue.
- De Vries Art Gallery. Season of 1868. 22d Exhibition. Catalogue. (Boston: J.P. Plumer, Printer, 46 Congress Street)
- De Vries' Art Gallery. 34th Special Exhibition. Season of 1869.
