= Schoenhof =

Schoenhof may refer to:

- Krásný Dvůr (Schönhof in German), Czech Republic
- Schoenhof's Foreign Books, a bookstore in Boston

== People ==
- Carl Schoenhof (1843–1911), American bookseller and publisher
