= Taylor & Adams =

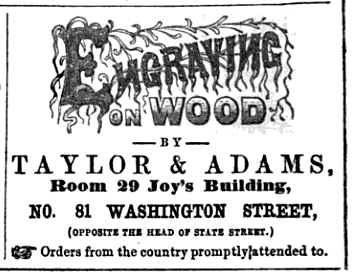
Advertisement for Taylor & Adams, "engraving on wood," Joy's Building, Washington St., Boston, 1852

Taylor & Adams was an engraving firm in Boston, Massachusetts, in the mid-19th century, established by James L. Taylor and Thomas W. Adams. The business operated from an office in Joy's Building on Washington Street in the 1850s and 1860s. Clients included the Boston Herald and publishers Lee & Shepard.

== Image gallery ==
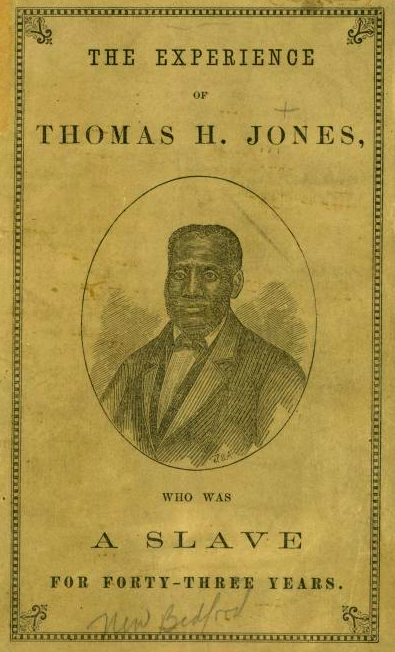
Illus. for The Experience of Thomas H. Jones, who was a Slave for 43 Years ca.1857

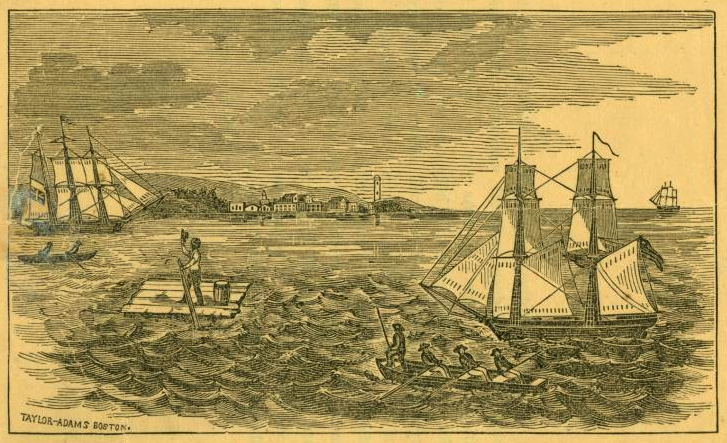
Illus. for The Experience of Thomas H. Jones, who was a Slave for 43 Years ca.1857

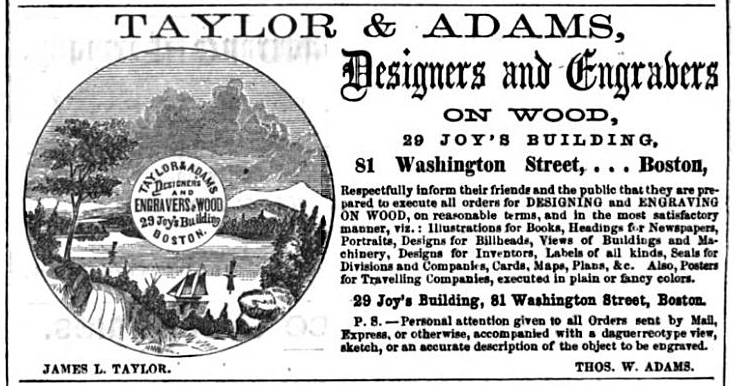
Ad for Taylor & Adams, 1861

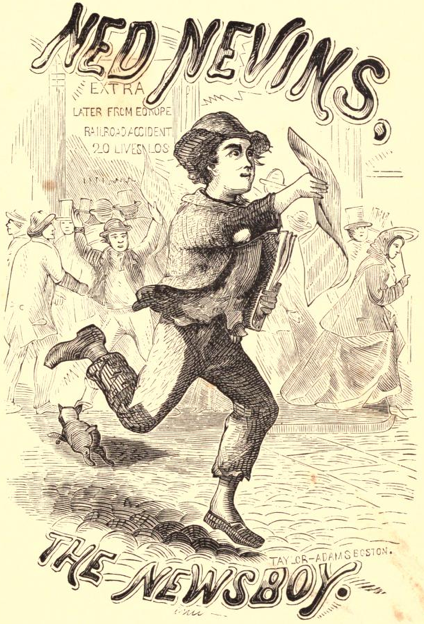
Illus. for Ned Nevins by Henry Morgan, ca.1867
