= Draper & Folsom =

Draper & Folsom (ca.1778–1783) were publishers in Boston, Massachusetts during the American Revolution. They printed works by William Billings, John Lathrop, and others. Around 1778, Edward Draper (d.1831) and John West Folsom (d.1825) formed a partnership as printers. They began working "at their printing-office, near the Lamb Tavern, Newbury-Street" (i.e. Washington Street); later in 1778 they moved to Winter Street. They issued numerous titles, including the weekly newspaper Independent Ledger and the American Advertiser. "The partnership between Draper & Folsom was dissolved on Nov. 3, 1783."
