= Independent Ledger and the American Advertiser =

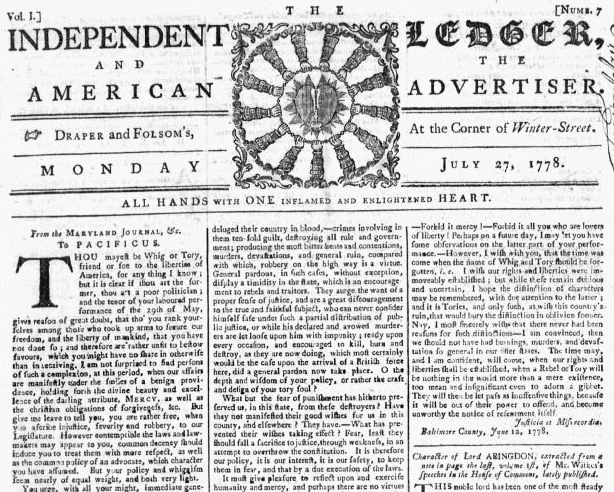
Independent Ledger, July 27, 1778

The Independent Ledger and the American Advertiser (June 15, 1778 – October 16, 1786) was a weekly newspaper published in Boston, Massachusetts, by Draper & Folsom. The 4-page paper was issued on Mondays, in contrast to Boston's other weeklies, which came out on Thursdays. When Draper left the partnership in 1783, Folsom continued publishing the newspaper until it ceased in 1786.

The newspaper did not impress all readers. "There were several papers commenced in this town during the war of the revolution; but they were not distinguished for much talent, or public spirit, and, of course, were soon discontinued, for want of patronage. The Public Ledger [i.e. Independent Ledger] instituted by Messrs. Draper & Folsom ... survived the revolution, a few years, and then fell also, while in the hands of Mr. Folsom, alone, from mere imbecility."
