= Deloss Barnum =

American photographer (1825 – 1873)

Isaac Deloss Barnum
- Born: November 1, 1825; New York City, U.S.
- Died: October 1, 1873 (aged 47)
- Occupation: Photographer
- Spouse: Harriet Jane Waters

Deloss Barnum (1825–1873) was a photographer in Boston, Massachusetts and New York, in the mid-19th century.

== Early life ==
He lived and worked on his family's farm in Otisco, New York until at least 1850.

== Career ==
Around 1857 he kept a daguerreotype studio on Winter Street in Boston; by 1858 he had moved to Commercial Street. In 1856-1860 he lived in Roxbury. He participated in the 1860 exhibition of the Massachusetts Charitable Mechanic Association. He moved back to New York by 1865 and was a farmer and photographer in Cortland. He died there at the age of 47 on October 7, 1873.

During his career he was referred to by several variant names: D. Barnum; Deblois Barnum; Delos Barnum; DeLos Barnum; and Deloss Barnum.

== Image gallery ==
Photographs by Deloss Barnum

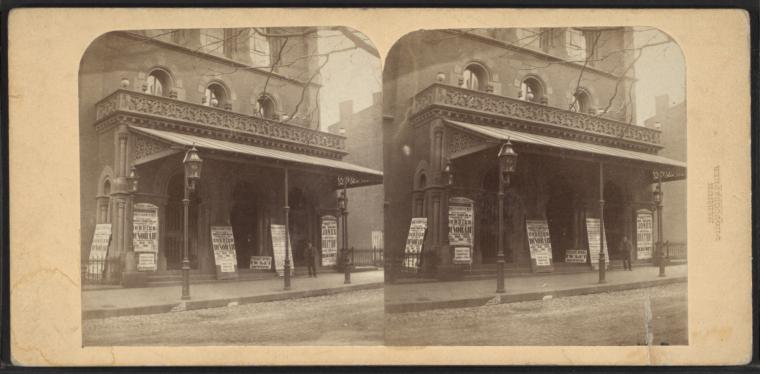
Academy of Music, Brooklyn

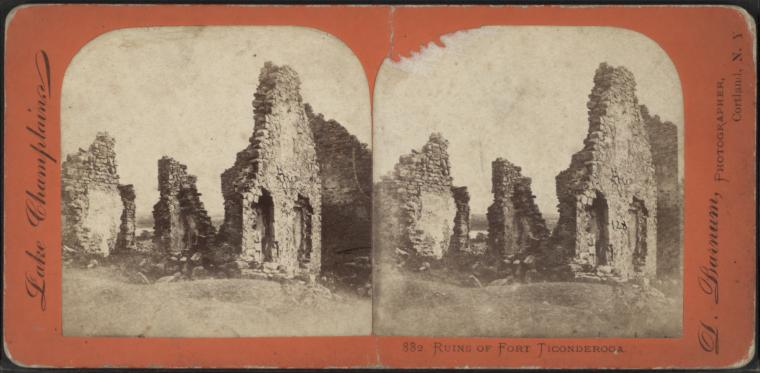
Ruins of Fort Ticonderoga, New York

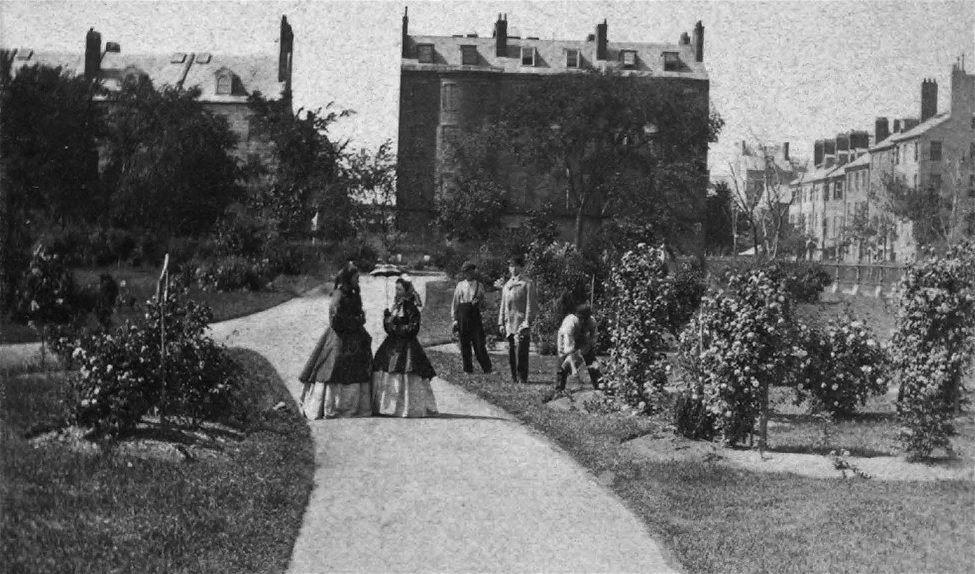
Boston Public Garden, ca.1860

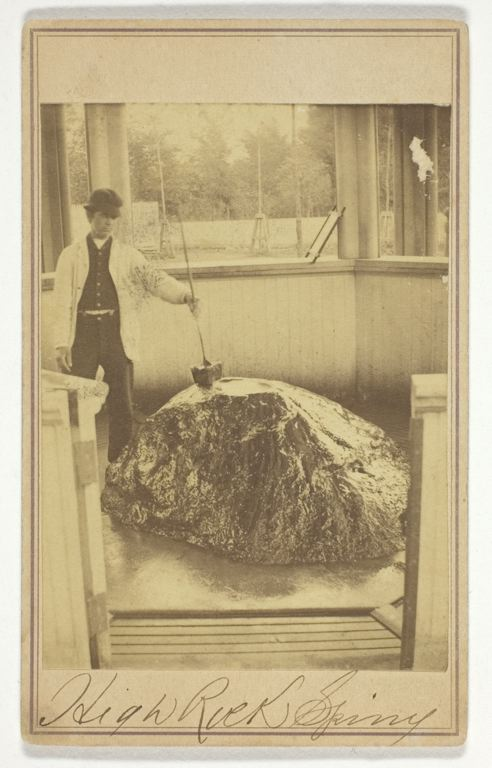
High Rock Spring, Saratoga Springs, New York, ca.1865

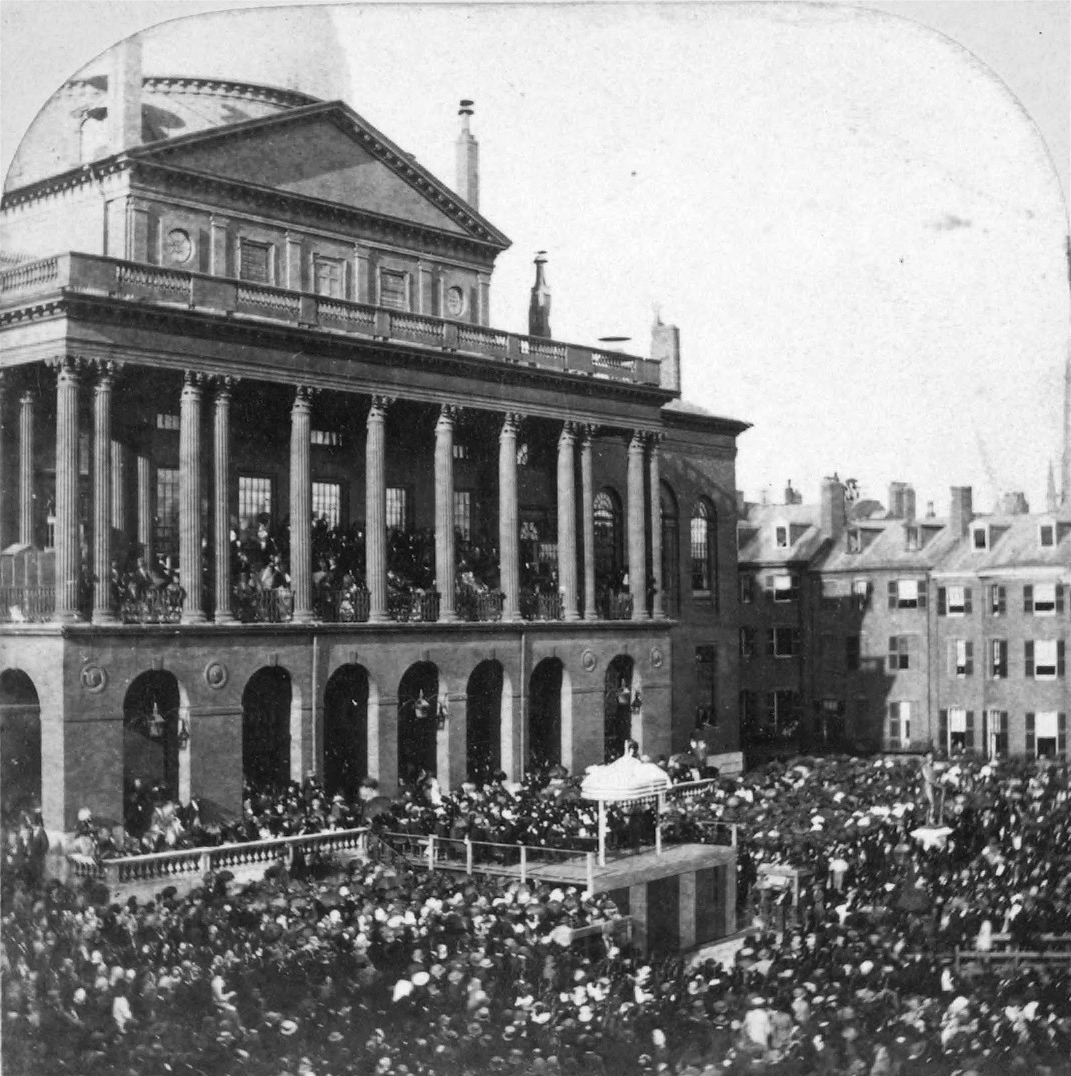
Inauguration of Daniel Webster statue, Massachusetts State House, Boston, September 17, 1859.

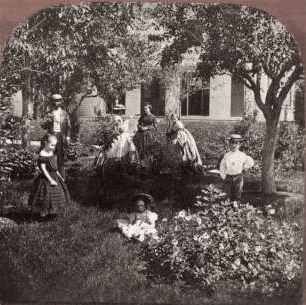
Flower garden, Southern Tier, NY

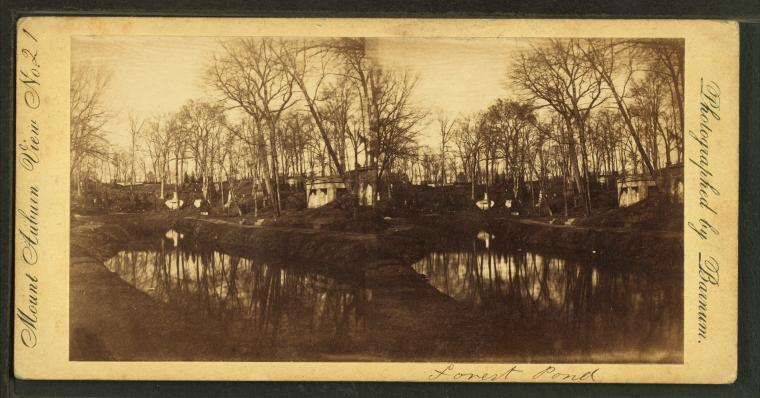
Mount Auburn Cemetery, Massachusetts

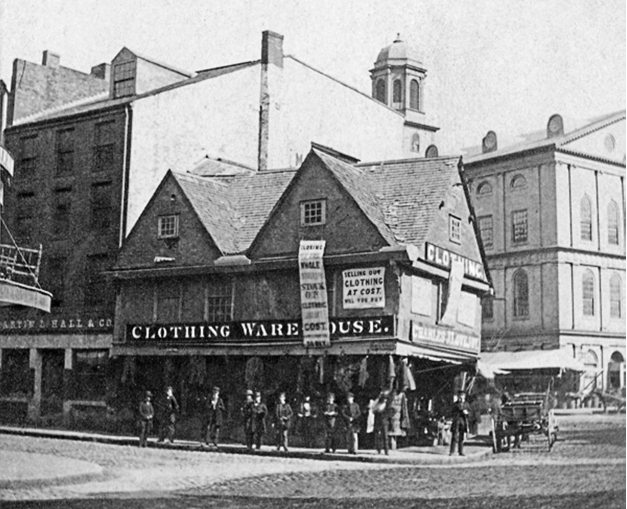
Old Feather Store, Boston, ca.1860

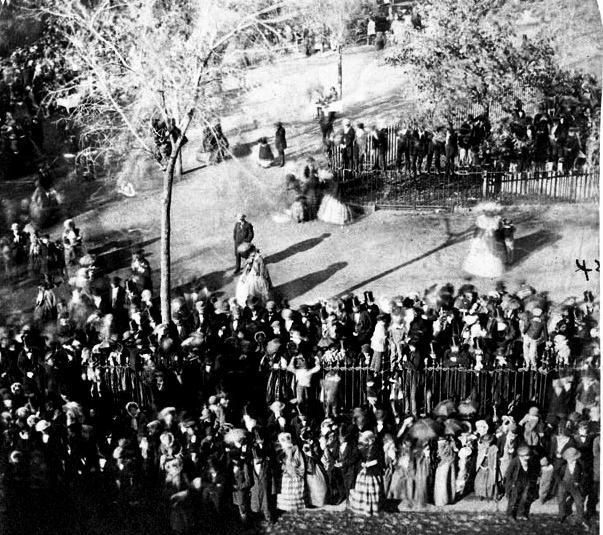
Crowd waiting near Boston Common for the Prince of Wales, October 18, 1860

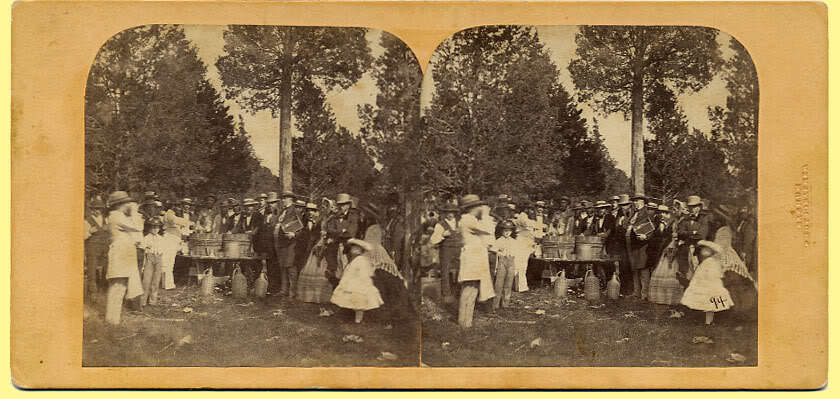
Picnic
