= Winter Street (Boston) =

Street in Boston, Massachusetts

Coordinates: 42°21′21.17″N 71°3′40.94″W

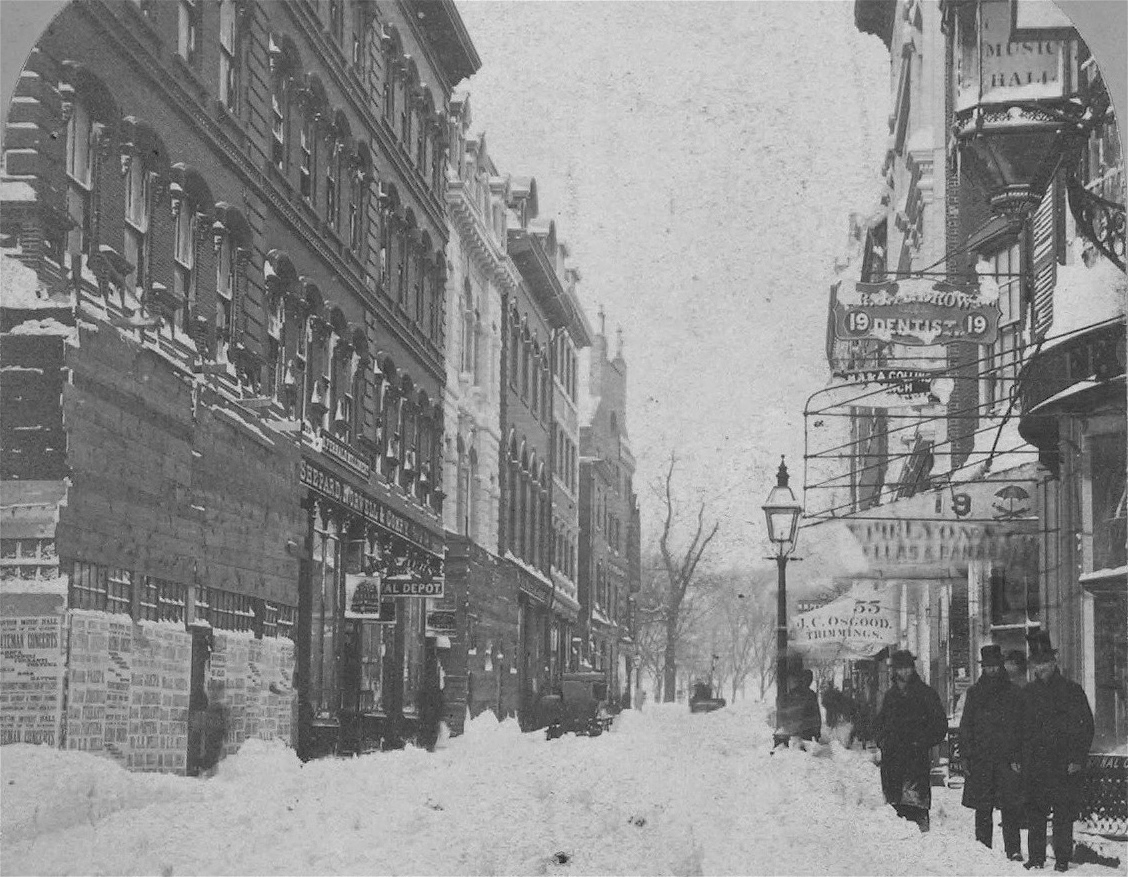
- Winter Street, Boston, c. 1860s (photo by John B. Heywood)
- Interactive map of Winter Street
- Location: Boston
- West end: Tremont Street
- East end: Washington Street

Winter Street in Boston, Massachusetts, is located between Tremont Street and Washington Street, near the Common. It is currently a pedestrian zone. Prior to 1708, it was called Blott's Lane and then Bannister's Lane. It was also known at times as "Winer Street".

== See also ==
- Downtown Crossing
- Boston Music Hall

Former tenants

- M.M. Ballou, publisher
- Deloss Barnum, photographer
- Central Church
- Walter Lofthouse Dean, 3 Winter Street, painter
- Draper & Folsom, publishers
- Fadettes of Boston
- Gilchrist's store
- A.N. Hardy, photographer
- Josiah Leavitt
- New England Emigrant Aid Company
- Polyanthos
- Henry and John Christian Rauschner, portraitists
- Schoenhof & Moeller
- S.R. Urbino, foreign books

== Image gallery ==
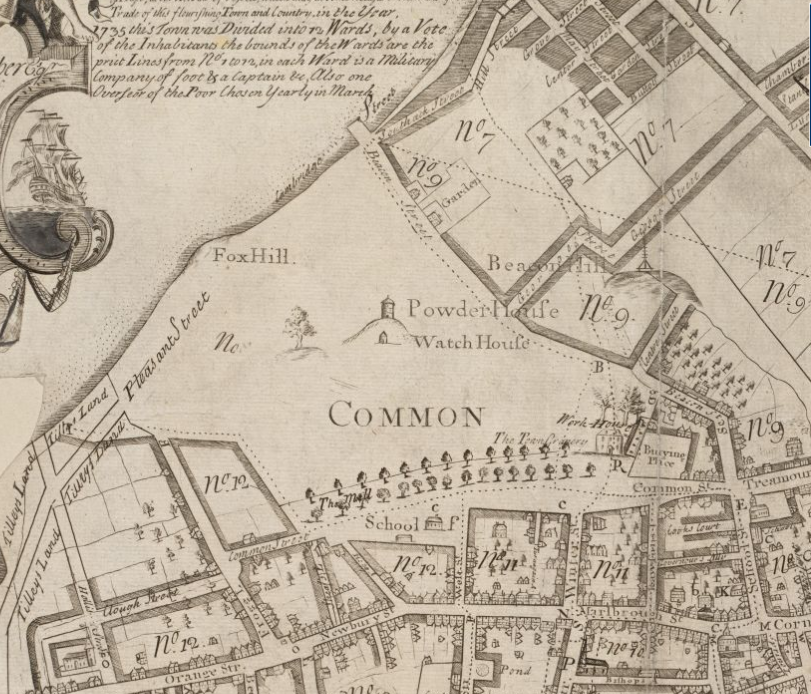
Detail of 1743 map of Boston, showing Winter St. and vicinity

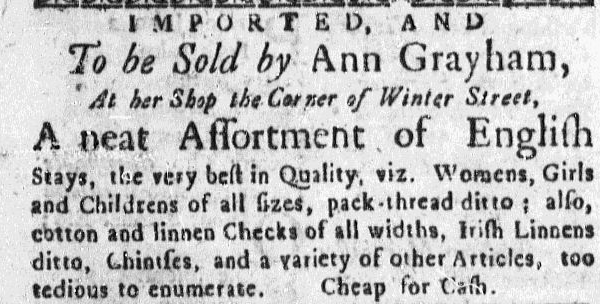
Ann Grayham, importer & retailer, 1767

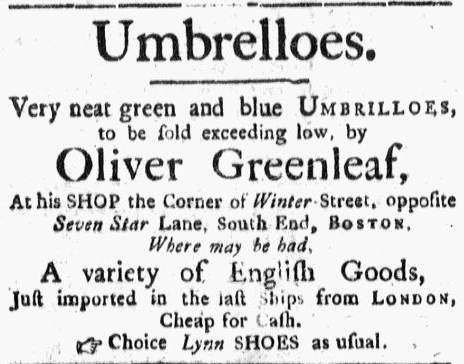
"Very neat green and blue umbrilloes, to be sold exceeding low, by Oliver Greenleaf," 1768 (Boston Evening-Post)

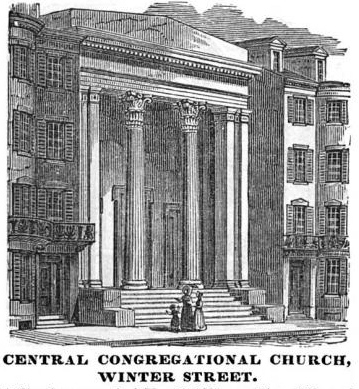
Central Congregational Church, c. 1851

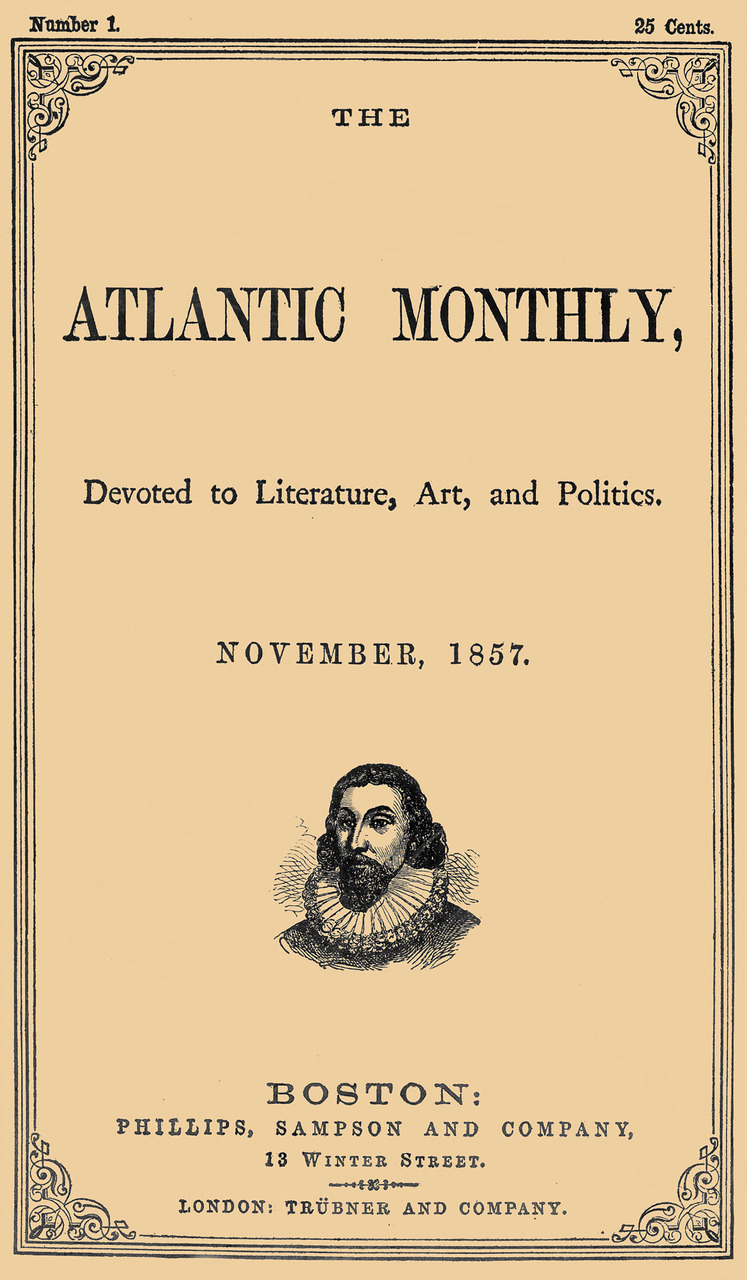
Atlantic Monthly, no.1, 1857; published by Phillips, Sampson & Co., 13 Winter St.

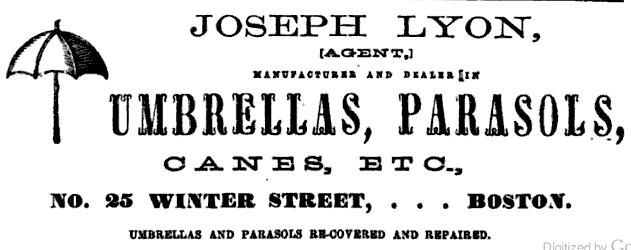
Joseph Lyon's "umbrellas, parasols, canes, etc.," 1861

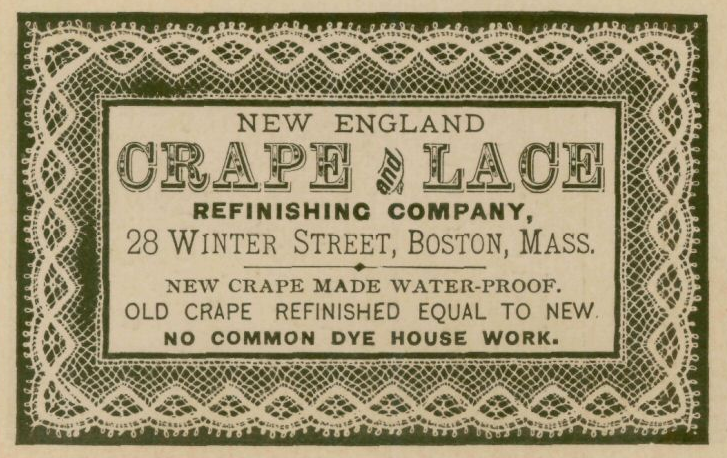
New England Crape and Lace Refinishing Co., c. 1870

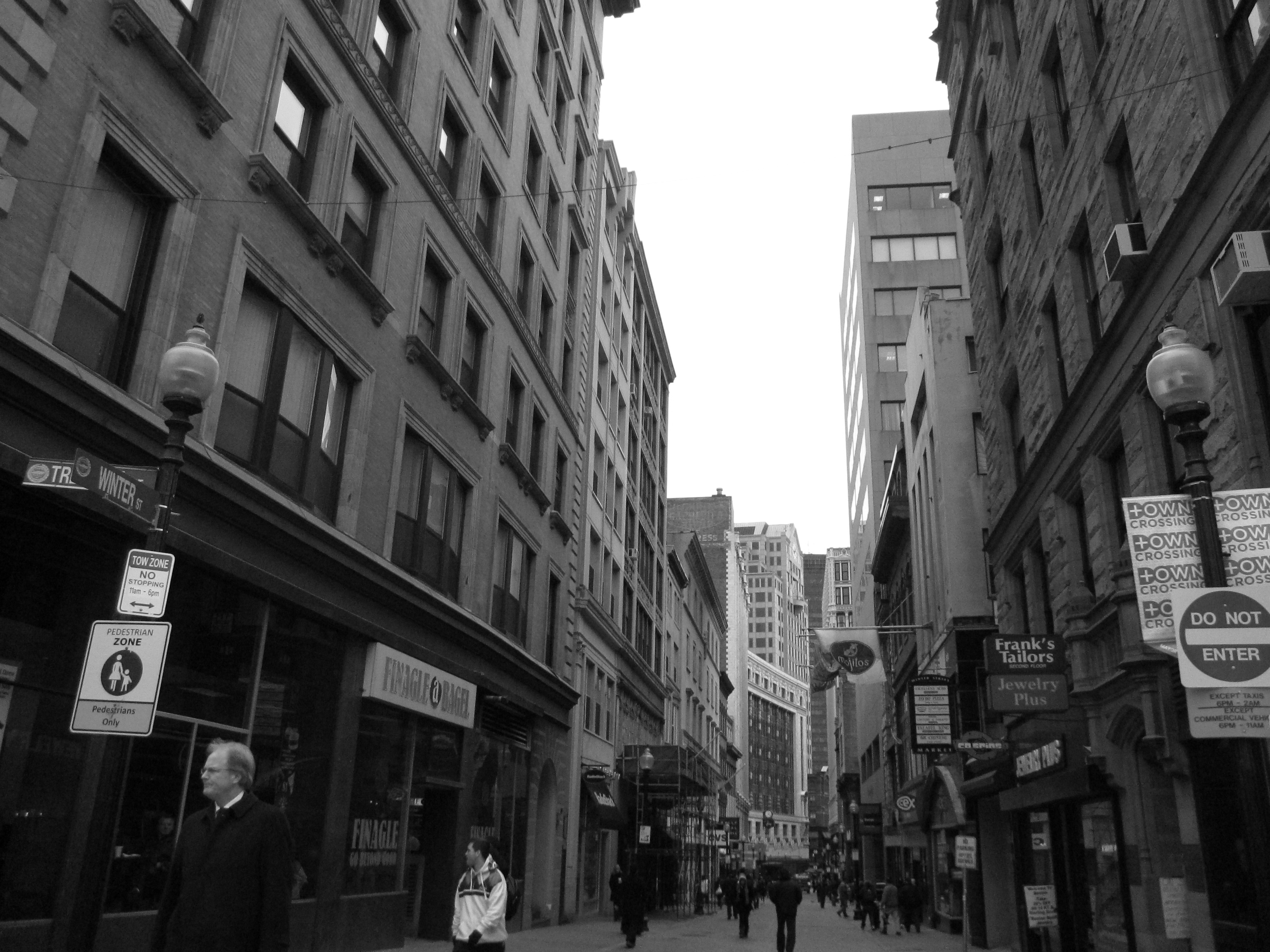
Winter Street, Boston, March 2010
