= Levina (Yogvinskoye Rural Settlement), Kudymkarsky District, Perm Krai =

Levina Левина
- Village
- Location within Perm Krai Location within Russia
- Coordinates: 59°06′N 54°42′E
- Country: Russia
- Region: Perm Krai
- District: Kudymkarsky District
- Time zone: UTC+5:00

Levina (Russian: Левина) is a rural locality (a village) in Yorgvinskoye Rural Settlement, Kudymkarsky District, Perm Krai, Russia. The population was 107 as of 2010.

== Geography ==
It is located 10 km north from Kudymkar.
