= Lee & Shepard =

Publishing and bookselling firm in Boston, Massachusetts, USA

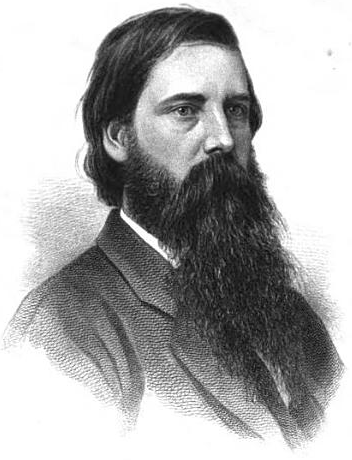
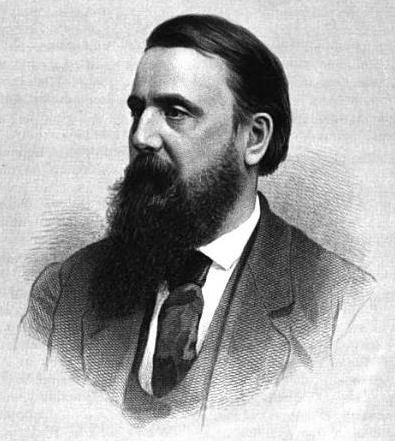
William Lee (l.) and Charles A.B. Shepard

Lee & Shepard (1862-1905) was a publishing and bookselling firm in Boston, Massachusetts, in the 19th century, established by William Lee (1826–1906) and Charles Augustus Billings Shepard (1829–1889) Authors published by the firm included: George Melville Baker; Sophie May; Henry Morgan; Oliver Optic; William Carey Richards; Francis Henry Underwood; Madeline Leslie and Levina Buoncuore Urbino. The business conducted its operations from offices at 149 Washington St. (ca.1872); the corner of Franklin and Hawley Street (1873–1885); and "adjoining the Old South," no. 10 Milk Street (ca.1885).

One of the first titles issued by the firm was the diary of Adam Gurowski, reviewed in 1862 by the New York Evening Post: "This work is a crabbed specimen of authorship. ... The humor of it is sometimes that of Thersites, when his thorny tongue lashed the heroes of the camp, and sometimes that of Caliban when he cursed the arts of his superiors. ... Yet it is a book to be carefully read. Under its rough and prickly burr there is a nutritive nut."

In 1905 Lee & Shepard merged with the Lothrop Company to form Lothrop, Lee & Shepard.

Lothrop, Lee & Shepard was eventually acquired by William Morrow and Company, which would be acquired by HarperCollins in 1999. Lothrop shut down its children's division soon after the acquisition. Lothrop is now an Imprint of HarperCollins.

== Images ==
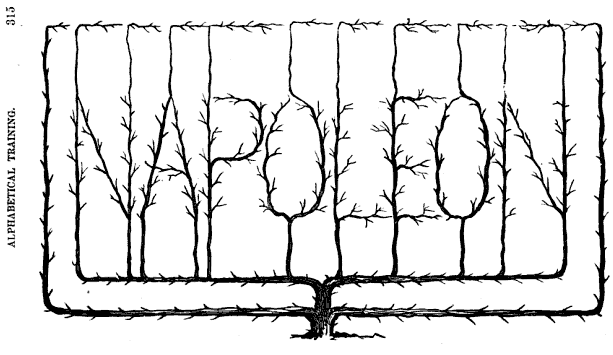
Illustration from: Charles R. Baker's Practical and scientific fruit culture (Boston: Lee & Shepard, 1866)

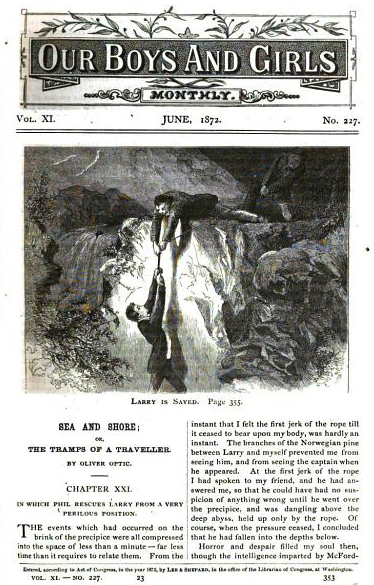
"Larry is saved." From: Our Boys and Girls Monthly, 1872

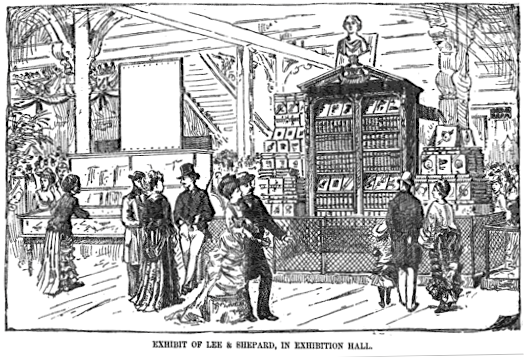
Display booth of Lee & Shepard at the exhibition of the Massachusetts Charitable Mechanic Association, held in Mechanics Hall, on Huntington Avenue, Boston, 1881

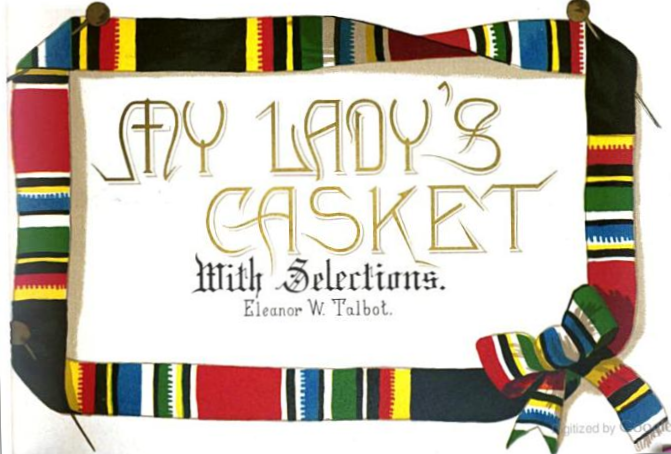
From: Eleanor Talbot's My Lady's Casket (Boston: Lee & Shepard, 1885)

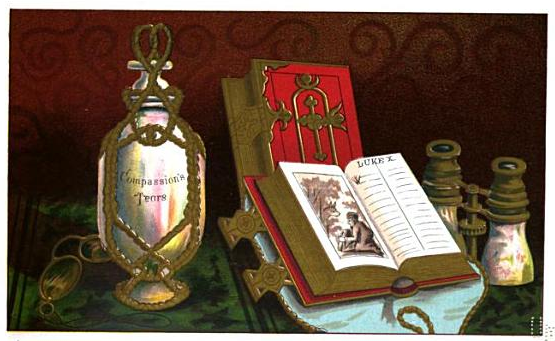
From: Eleanor Talbot's My Lady's Casket (Boston: Lee & Shepard, 1885)
