= Levina Buoncuore Urbino =

American writer

Levina Buoncuore Urbino or Lavinia Buoncuore Urbino (died 1888) was an American writer and translator who lived in the Boston, Massachusetts area in the 19th century. Among her published works was An American Woman in Europe (1869), a frank account of her travels in Europe 1866–1869; she also wrote children's books and a guide to art technique. She sometimes wrote under a pseudonym: L. Boncoeur, L. B. Cuore, or L. Buoncuore.

Her husband, S.R. Urbino, was a bookseller and publisher of foreign literature and language-instruction books. She served as an officer of the Massachusetts Society for the Prevention of Cruelty to Animals and supported the New England Hospital for Women and Children.

== Selected works ==
- Sunshine in the palace and cottage, or, Bright extremes in human life. Boston: Heath & Groves, 1854
- Miss Kate: or, the village teacher; a true character. Boston: New England Sabbath School Union, 1854. "Revised by the committee of publication" Google books
- The home angel. Boston: Wentworth & Co., 1858 Google books
- L. Boncoeur (i.e. Levina Buoncuore Urbino). L'instructeur de l'enfrance: (A first book for children), 2nd ed. Boston: S.R. Urbino, 1864
- E.M. Sewell, L.B. Urbino. Dictation exercises. Boston: S.R. Urbino; NY: Holt, 1867. Google books
- An American woman in Europe: The journal of two years and a half sojourn in Germany, Switzerland, France, and Italy. Boston: Lee and Shepard, 1869 Google books
- L.B. Urbino and Henry Day. Art recreations: being a complete guide to pencil drawing, oil painting, watercolor painting ... with valuable receipts for preparing materials. Boston: J.E. Tilton, 1869. "Splendidly illustrated" Google books
- L.B. Cuore [i.e. Levina Buoncuore Urbino]. Italian conversation-grammar, 5th ed. Boston: S.R. Urbino, 1870 Google books
- Biographical sketches of eminent musical composers. Boston: Oliver Ditson, 1876 Google books

Translations

- Céline Fallet; L.B. Urbino, translator. The old masters: The princes of art: painters, sculptors, and engravers. Boston: Lee and Shepard, 1870. Google books
