= Gustav zu Putlitz =

German author (1821–1890)

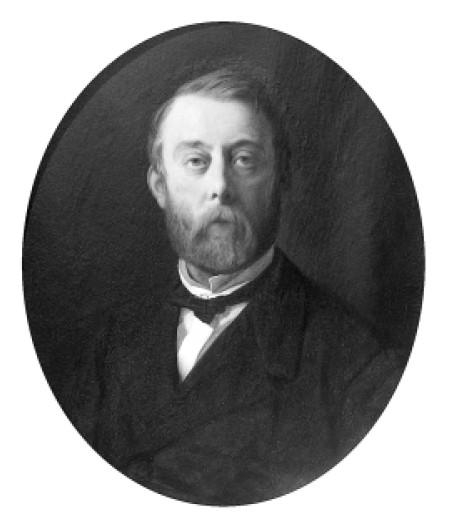

Gustav Heinrich Gans Edler zu Putlitz (20 March 1821 – 5 September 1890) was a German author.

== Biography ==
He was born at Retzin near Perleberg in West Prignitz, of the noble Gans zu Putlitz family. He studied law at Berlin and Heidelberg, and was attached to the provincial government at Magdeburg from 1846 to 1848. In 1853 he married Gräfin Elisabeth von Königsmark granddaughter of Wilhelmine, Gräfin von Lichtenau, and lived on his estate.

In 1863, he became director of the Court Theatre at Schwerin. This post he left in 1867, was for a short time chamberlain to the crown prince of Prussia, afterwards the Emperor Frederick III, and from 1873 to 1889 successfully directed the Court theatre at Karlsruhe. He died at Retzien.

== Works ==
Putlitz made his debut as a writer with a volume of romantic fairy stories in verse, Was sich der Wald erzählt (Tales told among the woods; 1850), which attained great popularity (fifty editions) and found many imitators.

He was most successful in his comedies, notably Badekuren (Spa cures; 1859), much read in the schools of the United States; Das Herz vergessen (Forgetting the heart; 1853), also much read in U.S. schools; and Spielt nicht mit dem Feuer! (do not play with fire!; 1887). These portrayed life among the upper classes. Two notable dramas are Das Testament des Grossen Kurfürsten (1858) and Rolf Berndt (1881).

Of his novels, Die Alpenbraut (Bride of the Alps; 1870) and Walpurgis (1870) are distinguished by refined terseness of style and delicacy of portraiture. Also notable are Vergissmeinnicht (Forget me not; 1851), Brandenburgher Geschichten (Brandenburg Tales; 1862), Novellen (1863), and Funken unter der Asche (Sparks under the ashes; 1871).

=== Editions ===
A selection of his works, Ausgewählte Werke, was published in six volumes in Berlin (1872–1877), and a supplementary volume in 1888; his comedies, Lustspiele, appeared in two series of four volumes each (1851–1860 and 1869–1872).

== Sources ==
- Gilman, D. C.; Peck, H. T.; Colby, F. M., eds. (1905). "Putlitz, Gustav Heinrich Gans, Edler von and zu" . New International Encyclopedia (1st ed.). New York: Dodd, Mead.
- Rines, George Edwin, ed. (1920). "Putlitz, Gustav Heinrich Gans, Edler Herr von und zu" . Encyclopedia Americana.

Attribution:

- This work in turn cites Elisabeth zu Putlitz, Gustav zu Putlitz, Ein Lebensbild aus Briefen (Gustav zu Putlitz, a life sketch from letters; 3 vols., Berlin, 1894–1895).
