= Carl Schoenhof =

American bookseller

Carl Schoenhof (c. 1843 – 1911) was a bookseller and publisher in Boston, Massachusetts, in the 19th century. He specialized in foreign books. Born in Carlsruhe, Germany, he attended University of Heidelberg. He moved to the U. States around 1864. Shortly thereafter he worked for Boston publishers DeVries, Ibarra & Co., and took over the business in 1870. His business ventures included Schoenhof & Moeller (c. 1870–1878, with Fanny Moeller), Cupples & Schoenhof (c. 1891), and Schoenhof Book Co. (ca.1890s).

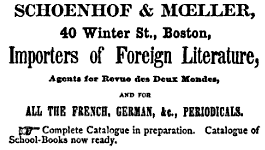
Advertisement for Schoenhof & Moeller, 1875

Henry James approved of Schoenhof & Moeller, describing it in 1878 as "a vastly better shop than any of the kind in London." Around 1889, "Mr. Schoenhof [was] the general agent for the United States for Hachette & Co.'s (London and Paris) publications for the study of foreign languages ... [and] for Henry Holt & Co.'s (New York) publications. ... [He also sold] Steiger & Co.'s, Wm. R. Jenkins', Geo. R. Lockwood & Son's, MacMillan's, Appleton's, Barnes' publications in foreign languages." Schoenhof's shop was located near the corner of Tremont and Winter Streets: at no.40 Winter St. (1875–1876), no.146 Tremont (1880–1881), no.144 Tremont (1887–1889), and no.128 Tremont (1902–1911). In 1893 he "sold out his interest to two of his employees, who continue[d] the business under the firm-name of Castor & Co."

Schoenhof's brother, Jacob Schoenhof, was an authority on economics, and served as U.S. consul to England during the Cleveland administration.

== See also ==
- List of booksellers in Boston
