= Henry Morgan (minister) =

American minister (1825–1884)

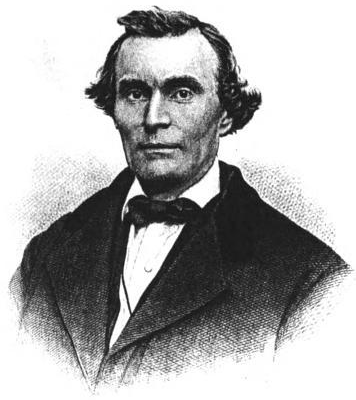
Portrait of Henry Morgan, ca.1870s

Henry Morgan (1825–1884) was an author and Methodist minister in Boston, Massachusetts, in the 19th century.

== Biography ==
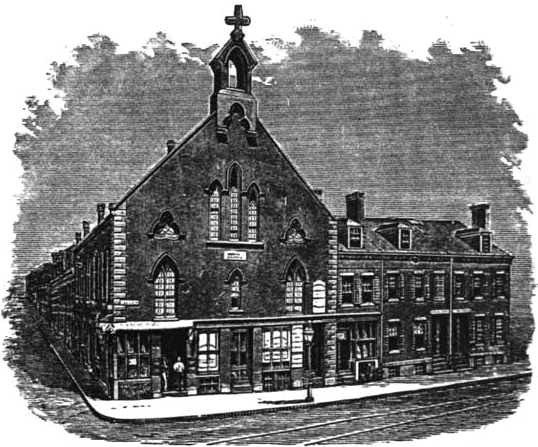
Morgan Chapel, Shawmut Avenue, Boston, ca.1874

Morgan moved to Boston in 1859. "He preached for some time to an independent congregation in the Music Hall. ... He was a popular lecturer."

By 1872 he was pastor and property-owner of the Morgan Chapel, First Independent Methodist Church (est.1861) on Shawmut Avenue (at Indiana Place) in Boston's South End.

Morgan died in 1884. In his will, he gave the Morgan Chapel "property in trust to the Benevolent Fraternity of Churches (Unitarian), with the understanding and proviso that it should be managed by a pastor appointed by the New England conference" of Methodists."

== Image gallery ==
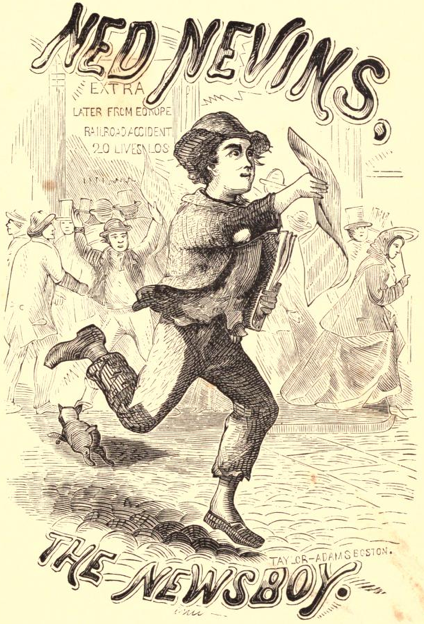
From Morgan's Ned Nevins, 1867. Illus. by Taylor & Adams

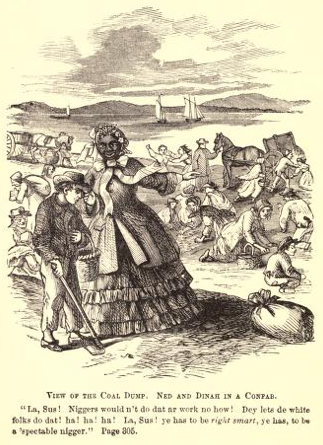
From Morgan's Ned Nevins, 1867: "View of the coal dump"

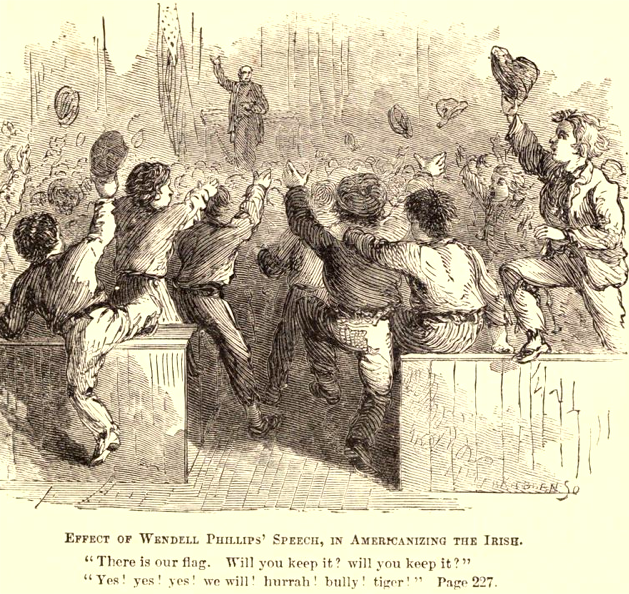
From Morgan's Ned Nevins, 1867: "Effect of Wendell Phillips' speech in Americanizing the Irish"

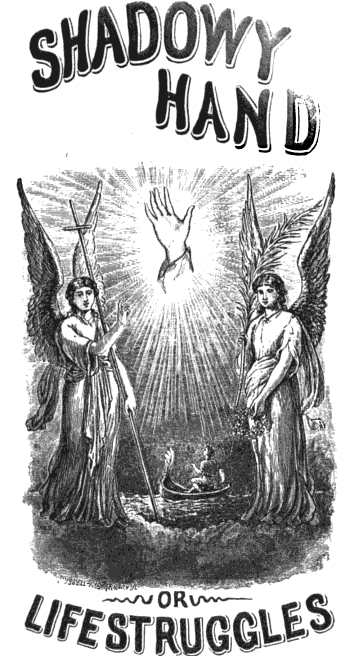
From Morgan's Shadowy Hand, 1874
