= Andrew Sprowle =

Scottish-born merchant (1710-1776

- Born: 1710; Milton, Dunbartonshire, Scotland
- Died: 29 May 1776 (age 65); Mathews County, Virginia
- Occupations: Merchant, slave trader, naval agent, shipyard owner
- Known for: founding Gosport Ship Yard (now Norfolk Naval Shipyard)

Andrew Sprowle (1710 – 1776) was a Scottish-born merchant, naval agent, landowner, shipyard owner, slaveholder and slave trader in Portsmouth, Virginia. Today Andrew Sprowle is best remembered for establishing the Gosport Ship Yard, now known as Norfolk Naval Shipyard. Sprowle emigrated from Milton, West Dunbartonshire, Scotland, to what is currently the Commonwealth of Virginia in the mid-18th century, where he lived until his death on 29 May 1776.

== Early life ==
Andrew Sprowle was born in 1710 in Milton, Dunbartonshire, Scotland, the third son of John Sprowle, Laird of Milton. Andrew's father, John Spreull I, held a number of important and profitable government posts, such as Commissioner of Supply for Ayrshire and Dumbarton and for paying army troops in the area. These crown positions, made him responsible for the collection and recording of land tax. During the Jacobite revolts of 1708, 1715 and 1719 see Jacobitism, Andrew's father John, stayed loyal to the crown and continued in office. As a young man Andrew Sprowle, probably journeyed from his home in Milton, the five miles to Glasgow often. His older brother John III, was enrolled in the Glasgow University and his father as a Commissioner would have had frequent business with contracts for the army in the port city. According to James Spreull, Andrew Sprowle's father died sometime in early 1731. Andrew's older brother John Spreull II, in accordance with primogeniture, inherited both the title of Laird, and family property. In Andrew Sprowle's lifetime, the family surname was spelled variously, sometimes even in the same document. Among the different spellings were, Sproule, Spreulle, Sproul, Sproull, and Sprowle. For example, Andrew's father, John, spelled his name Spreull while Andrew spelled it "Spreule and Sprowle." In this article, the family surname is spelled, Sprowle, the way he spelled it in his 1774 will, the exceptions being quotations from historical documents.

There is only one brief 1768 account by merchant William Nelson, of Andrew Sprowle's physical appearance. This was included in a letter of Nelson to John Norton, regarding a welcome speech Andrew Sprowle delivered on behalf of the Virginia merchants, to the new colonial Governor Norborne Berkeley.,

"The old Fellow wears his own Hair, as white as old Charles Hansford's was, with a Pig tail to it, but bald as the brave Lord Granby;John Manners, Marquess of Granby and cuts as droll a Figure as you ever saw Him in a Silk coat & two or three holes in his stocking at the same Time he is a respectable Appearance, the oldest among the Trade, & acquitted himself well. Sprowle's address to the governor showed "plainness [sic] Elegance & Simplicity, and far out does the studied Performance of the P[rofessors] & Masters of the College."

In his 1774 will, Andrew Sprowle, confirmed he had a portrait made and carefully notated his instructions regarding its disposition, "I recommend my picture being sent home to my sister. She orders the delivery of it and at her death to those relations of mine that will take good care of it." The portrait was apparently sent to his younger sister Jane, current location unknown. The family history though is available in James Sproule's Eight Centuries of the Spreull and Sproule Families.

== Portsmouth, Virginia ==
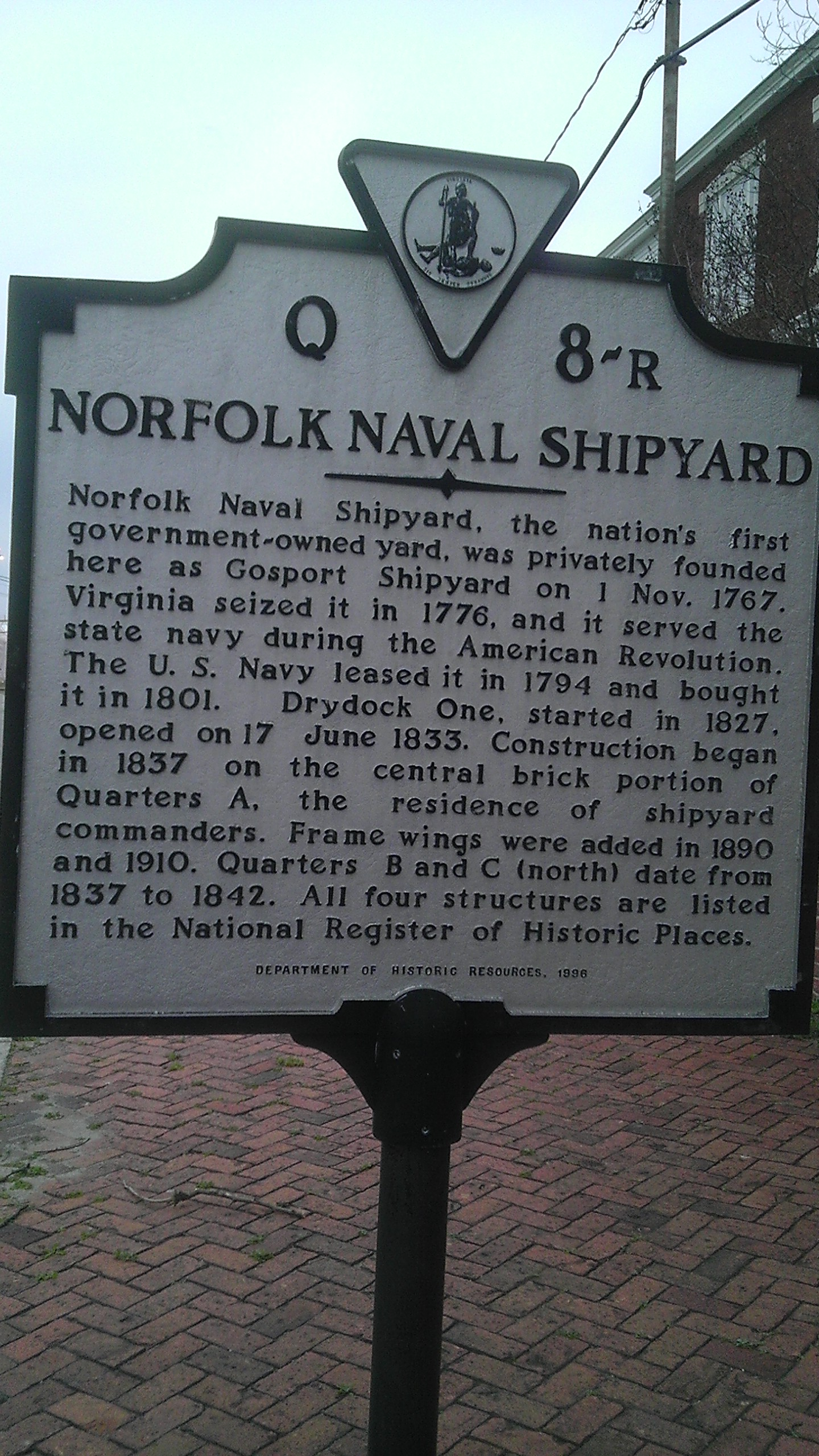
Founded by Andrew Sprowle in 1767, Gosport Navy Yard is known today as Norfolk Naval Shipyard.

Andrew Sprowle, like many younger sons, left Scotland about 1733 to seek his fortune in Virginia, the exact date is disputed. His second wife Katherine Hunter Sprowle, later recalled, Andrew came to colonial Virginia circa 1725, however British documents record him as arriving in Virginia in 1733. Yet another publication Scots on the Chesapeake 1607 - 1830 has Sprowle arriving in Virginia in 1735. Few documents regarding his early years in Hampton Roads, survive. These are mostly fragments of court records listing ships and property that he owned. After emigrating from Scotland, he settled in Norfolk Borough where opportunities for wealth were available in the soon-developing town of Portsmouth. The first records we have for Andrew Sprowle in Virginia, reflect by the 1730s, he was associated with Alexander Mackenzie, a Scottish merchant as "apprentice, clerk, or partner, later becoming an independent merchant in the mid-1740s..."

Sprowle was well respected in the mercantile community, serving for 36 years as President of the Court of Virginia Merchants. While Sprowle became a substantial men of business in the 1750s, he never attained any local political office such as alderman. According to Norfolk County Court records, he was listed as a merchant of Norfolk Borough in 1746, and in 1752 purchased Portsmouth lots (numbers 11, 12 and 24) from William Crawford, acquiring other town lots and extending his holdings within a few years across Crab Creek with several waterfront tracts in Gosport, including part of the site of what later became the Gosport Navy Yard, and was still buying Gosport property as late as 1772.

In 1763, Portsmouth underwent its first annexation, expanding the western boundary. The same year, an early governing body of Town Trustees were named, including Andrew Sprowle, George Veale, Thomas Veale, Charles Steuart, Humphrey Roberts, Francis Miller, James Rae, David Purcell and Amos Etheridge.

== Marriage to Anabella McNeill ==
In his 1774 will Andrew Sprowle wrote he wished to be buried in Trinity Church grounds, Portsmouth, Virginia, "I also order for myself a genteel funeral but not extravagant and to be buried in Portsmouth church yard alongside the funeral pile of Anabella McNeill, alias Sprowle and such a tombstone erected for my remains and to be covered with Irish marble stone now lying at Gosport." Except for this brief mention, no other records have been found regarding Sprowle's first wife.

== Slaveholder/Slave Trader ==
While widely known that Andrew Sprowle's established the Gosport shipyard which built and repaired naval and merchant ships, the extent of his slave-holding, slave trading and ownership of slave trading vessels, has receive far less attention. Thomas McCulloch, Andrew Sprowle's business manager and executor of his estate, later testified that Sprowle's highly trained enslaved workforce were integral to his shipyard and other businesses. "Among the men an excellent Skipper and Pilot and two or three good sailors, an excellent Caulker, a Cooper, a Miller, a Mason, a Joiner, a Painter, a Glazier, a Sawyer, three good Planters and several Jobbers." Thomas McCulloch specifically noted Sprowle hired out his enslaved workers for other nautical jobs for additional income and added that "Mr. Sprowle's Books of Accounts will shew the wages for them hired." McCulloch further explained that Lord Dunmore's hasty departure from Virginia," Mr. Sprowle's negro sailors being all dead, he was exposed to great danger and suffered much distress.", see thumbnail re his statement of 26 January 1784. The enslaved women were listed as "Cooks, Laundry Maids, Sempstresses, House Maids, Spinners &c." McCulloch calculated the total value of the enslaved workforce as £1200 sterling. Except for their monetary value Andrew Sprowle, showed little regard for his large enslaved workforce. In 1774, he left instructions "I order my plantation at Sewells Point be disposed of not too soon with my Negros or without." Ever the business man, Sprowle explained that the Blacks, the other wares and merchandise to fetch a good price "be disposed of not too soon from the hardness of the time." Documentation for Andrew Sprowle's enslaved workforce taken from the Virginia Tax records can be found posted at the University of Sidney, Black Loyalist, under Andrew Sproule (Sprowle).

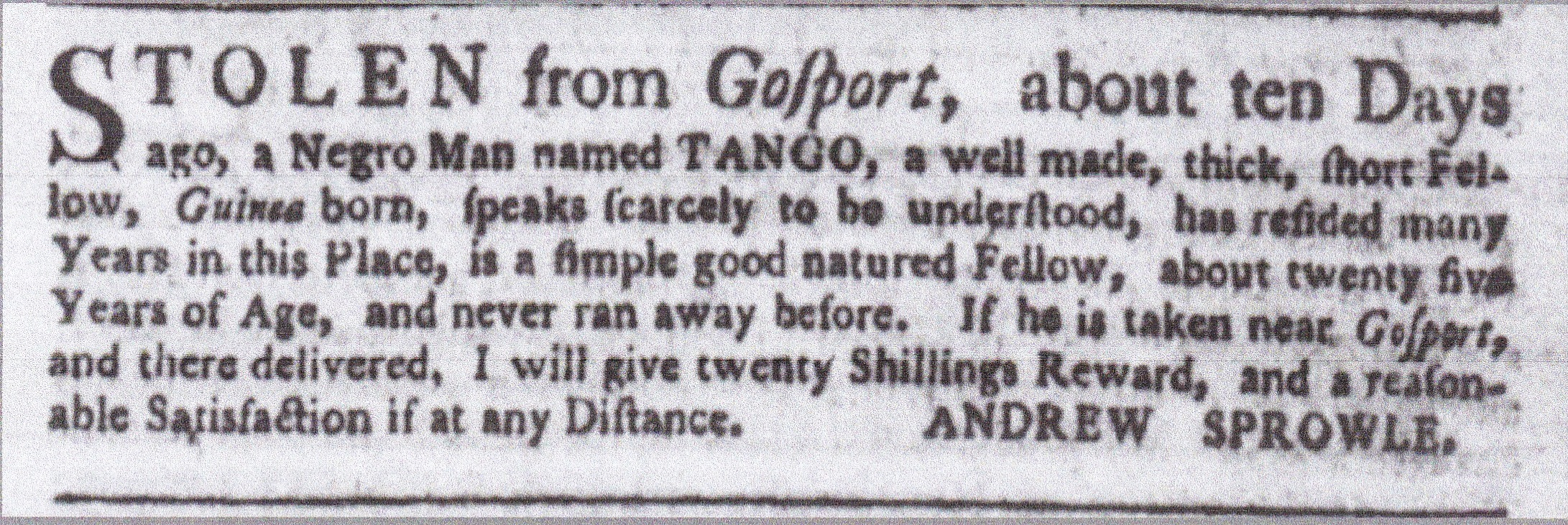
"Stolen from Gosport, a Negro man Tango" Virginia Gazette (Williamsburg, Virginia) 4 February 1773, p.3. Tango was born in Africa and may have been transported on one of Sprowle's slave trading vessels

One of Sprowle's warehouses was used as a slave market. A substantial slaveholder Sprowle still occasionally rented additional enslaved labor from the Elizabeth River Anglican Vestry to supplement his household staff.

In 1935 scholar Elisabeth Donnon, found at least two of Andrew Sprowle's vessels, the brigantine Saint Andrew and the sloop Providence, employed in the intercolonial slave trade. British Admiralty records from the years 1748 to 1751 confirmed Sprowle as the owner of both vessels.

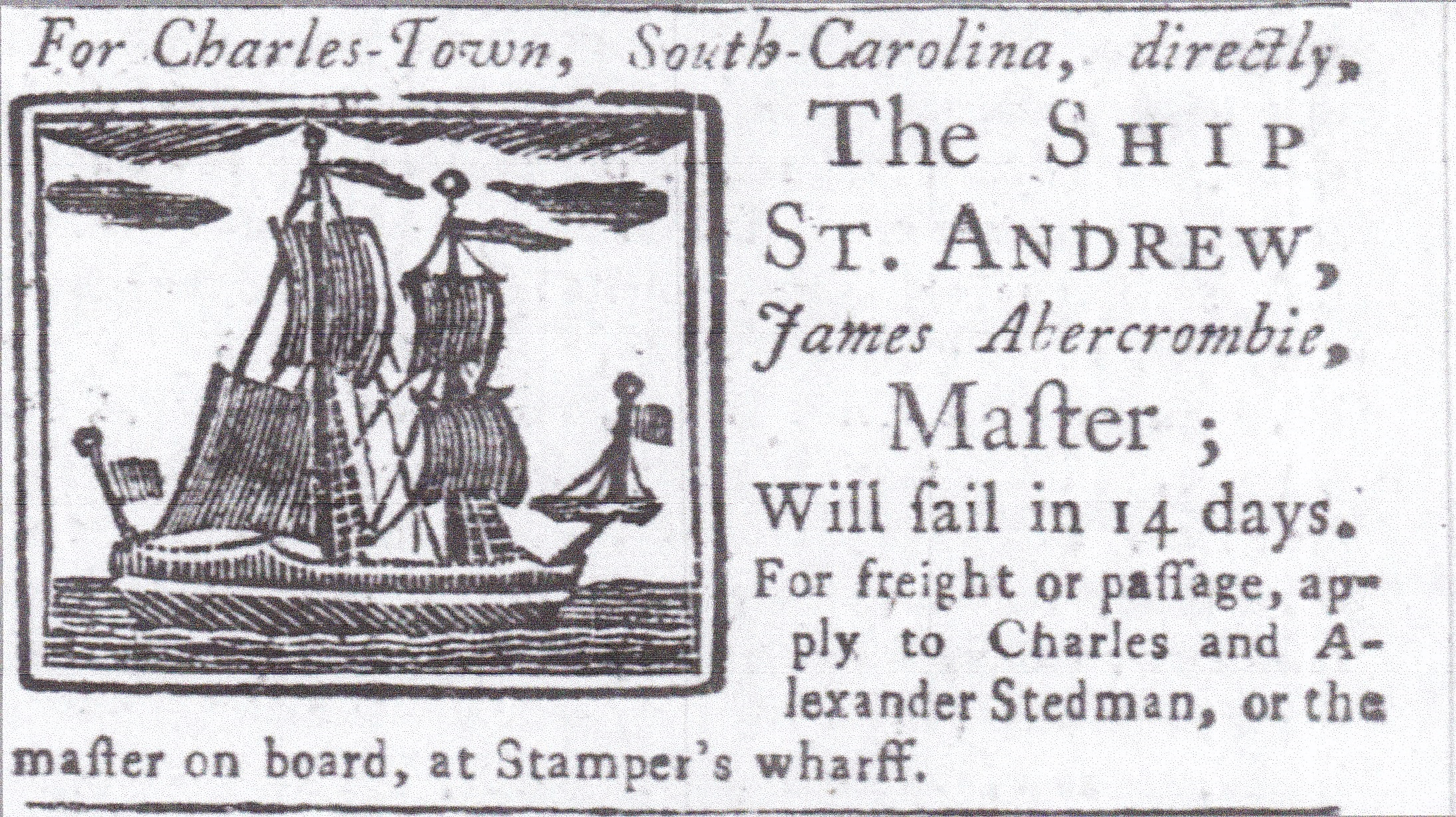
"The Ship St Andrew", The Saint Andrew owned by Andrew Sprowle, in 1749 made at least one voyage to Antigua where it picked up slaves for Virginia. (Pennsylvania Gazette, Penn), 2 Nov 1749, p.3

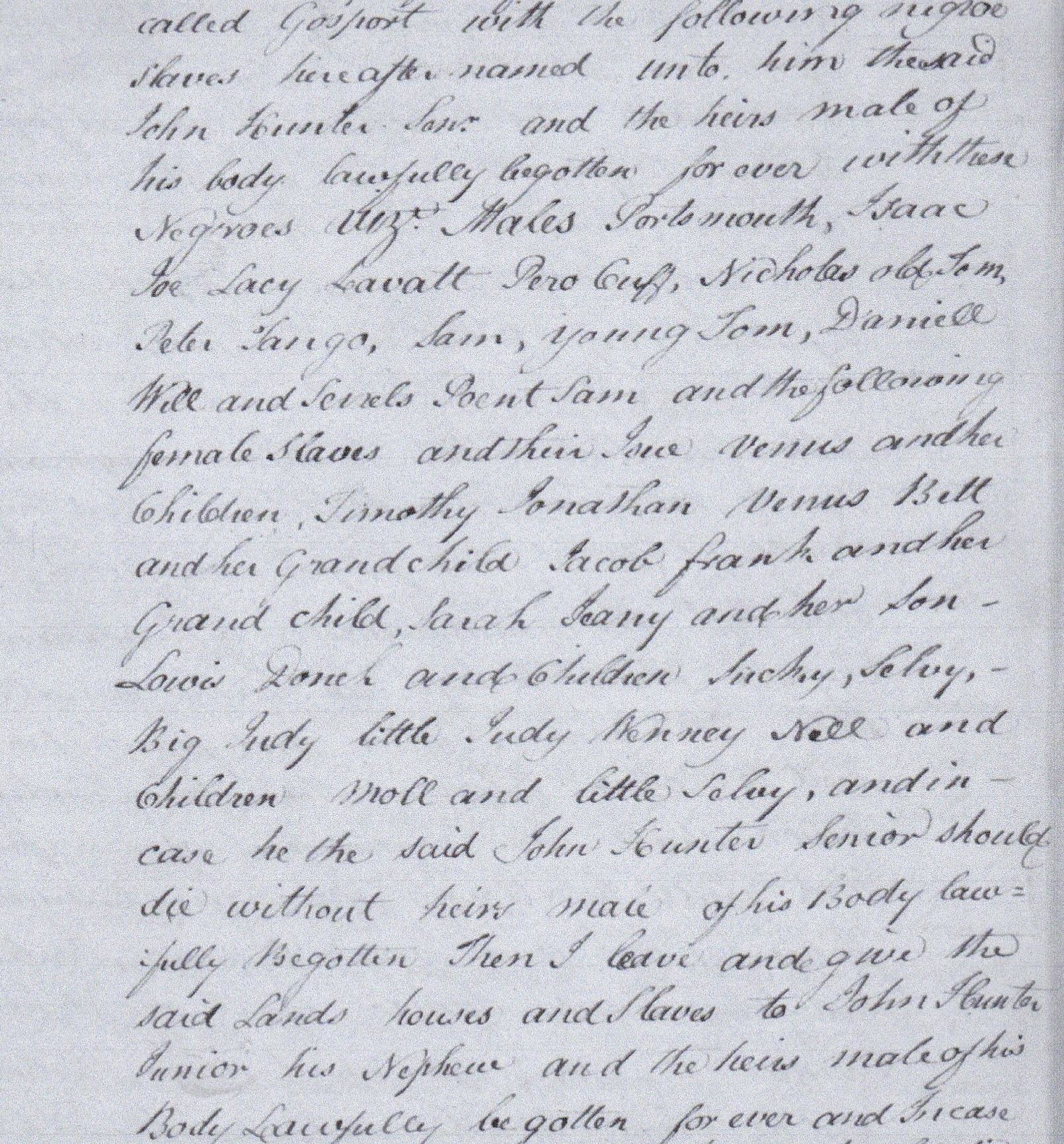
Partial list of slaves from Andrew Sprowle's will 1774, p.1058.

There is evidence that the St. Andrew, Providence and a third Sprowle vessel named the Glasgow, in the 1740s and 1750 made transatlantic voyages; which carried several hundred enslaved Africans to the Caribbean. The majority Intra-American and Trans Atlantic records do not provide the names of the vessel owners on the official manifests. The documentation for Intra-American and Trans Atlantic slave trade during the colonial era, is discussed by David Elis. A vessel of Andrew Sprowle's may have been responsible for forcibly abducting an African man named "Tango" from Guinea on the west African coast (see thumbnail), and transporting him via the triangular trade to Portsmouth Virginia. Tango was recaptured and he is recorded in Andrew Sprowle's 1774 will see thumbnail.

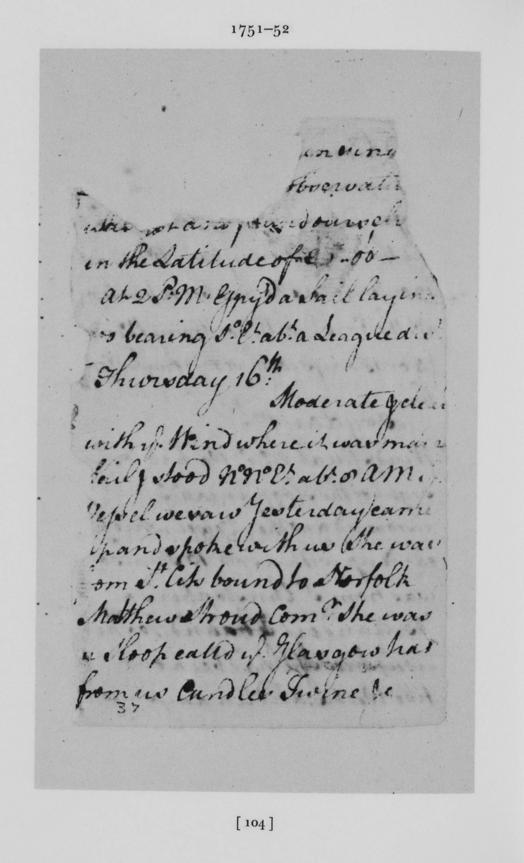
George Washington's diary, 18 Oct 1751: "sloop, Glasgow fm St Croix bound to Norfolk, Matthew Shroud, Comm, owner Andrew Sprowle"

George Washington, on a trip to Barbados recorded in his diary entry, for, 18 October 1751, "A sloop called the Glasgow, Matthew Stroud, comd, owner Andrew Sprowle." The vessel cleared Port Hampton 18 Oct. 1751, bound for St. Kitts. George Washington was somewhat familiar with Sprowle as the firm of "Sprowle & Crooks" is recorded for the year 1771 in Washington's business ledgers re the purchase of candles.

== Privateer ==
During the French and Indian War (1754-1763) Andrew Sprowle, at his shipyard, outfitted and armed vessels as privateers. During the war, Francis Fauquier (1703-1768), Lieutenant Governor of Virginia Colony, issued Sprowle, and other rich merchants, letters of marque and reprisal which made it legal for them to convert merchant vessels so as to attack, board and seize foreign ships which were at war with Great Britain. "Sprowle was active enough in his sponsorship of privateers to attract the attention of British officials". Sprowle's ship was said to have intercepted and captured a Spanish vessel, taken the vessel, her cargo and held her crew and captain prisoner. since Spain was not technically at war with Great Britain, this action provoked a complaint from the Spanish government to the office of the Board of Trade in London and provoked governor Fauquier, to write the following, "For I granted a letter of Marque to Mr. Sprowle, a Merchant of Norfolk, for a privateer, He has refused to make him any satisfaction although he [the Spanish Captain] fell sick and died in the country. His [Sprowle] conduct has appeared to me so scandalous." There is no record that Governor Fauquier ever followed up on this incident, though Sprowle and other privateers made a lucrative business in selling and auctioning such cargo, see thumbnail.

Virginia Gazette 22 April 1757, p.4 announcement of Andrew Sprowle's privateer Providence's capture of merchant vessel Graceland and sale of the cargo by auction.

== "A Merchant of Great Repute" ==
An anonymous French traveler in April 1767, visited Andrew Sprowle's new residence, near Portsmouth Virginia where he dined and was shown the estate and the shipyard. Much impressed with Sprowle's Gosport residence, he wrote,

"April the 19th, dined today with Andrew Sproul Esq., the head man of Portsmouth. He lives in a pleasant place separated by a creek from the town. His house goes by the name of Gosport. He has a very fine wharf, before his door, where the Kings ships generally heave down. This gentleman is a merchant of great repute."

== Gosport Shipyard ==
Sprowle founded the Gosport Ship Yard in 1767 under the British flag.

The new shipyard was undoubtedly modeled on similar installations Sprowle saw as a young man on the banks of the River Clyde. As Thomas Costa has written Andrew Sprowe's Gosport shipyard was "literally a domain apart from the local merchants." Sprowle's business acumen was in locating his new shipyard directly across the Elizabeth River from Portsmouth Virginia. He also demonstrated a flair for marketing by christening his new ship yard "Gosport", short for "Gods Port", after a similar one in England. His central warehouse was meant to be permanent. The new yard included a large five-story warehouse which was then one of the largest buildings in North America. The massive structure was five stories and built with stone, 91 feet in length and 41 feet wide the whole of very substantial materials and strong work and craft value upwards of 1,000 £ sterling. His shipyard, rapidly became a local wonder. Sprowle's business agent, Thomas McCulloch, later testified "that at Gosport which he founded and where he dwelt his Majesty's Ships on that Station usually layover in the Winter months for the convenience of watering and other necessities and on occasion careened, refitted or repaired." Sprowle's new shipyard on the Elizabeth River quickly enabled him to command much of the ship work in the colony and as his yard and warehouses at Gosport grew it became one of the largest complexes of its kind in the South.

In addition, Sprowle's shipyard property included three other warehouses, an accounting house, smith's shop, a dwelling house and kitchen and a large iron crane with brass sheaves, imported from London. The shipyard now known as Norfolk Naval Shipyard, and is the United States Navy's oldest continually operating shipyard, predating the U.S. Department of the Navy by 31 years.

== The Norfolk Anti-inoculation Riots 1768-1769 ==
In the summer of 1768 fear of smallpox, Variola major contagion prevailed in the Norfolk area, motivated a group of Scottish merchants led Dr. Archibald Campbell,(this group included Andrew Sprowle) to seek inoculation. The merchants requested Dr. John Dalgleish to inoculate through Variolation their families and their slaves, against smallpox. Rumors quickly spread that a similar effort in Yorktown, Virginia, had triggered a smallpox epidemic. This left many citizens, confused frightened and suspicious. Slaveholders routinely inoculated their slaves and watched the results prior to inoculating their own families; in the public mind this drove fear that inoculation might actually spread smallpox rather than check it. As this fear spread among those opposed to inoculation, mobs formed and attacked Dr. Campbell's plantation which was to be the inculcation site. Two days later, his house was burned down. Those who were inoculated were driven by the mob to the Norfolk pest house. Dr. Dalgleish, was bought to trial but not cleared until the following year, since inoculation though relatively new was not against Virginia or Crown law. In June 1770 however, an act to "regulate the Smallpox with in the Colony" was passed to severely penalize "anyone willfully importing variolous matter with the intention of inoculating". The smallpox riots at Norfolk in 1768 and 1769 left a bitter legacy. One reason was the rioters who attacked the merchants were never held to account and the Scottish merchants including Andrew Sprowle became identified in the public mind, with allowing their slaves to spread contagion. A second was in Colonial America, there was growing unrest over financial obligations to the Scottish merchants – this could have very well been a motivating factor behind the violence and bias in Norfolk. Many of those in Norfolk who identified with the patriot cause during these years were against inoculation and as well as most of the elected leaders in the Norfolk community, the result was a further erosion of public confidence in the judiciary's power to bring law breakers to justice. Many of anti -inoculation group, would later claim Sprowle and the other pro-inoculation loyalists attempted to spread the dread disease. Shortly after Sprowle's death, just such a note appeared in the 15 June 1776 issue of the Virginia Gazette, gloatingly linked the two.

We learn from Gloucester, that Lord Dunmore has erected hospitals upon Gwyn's Island; that his old friend Andrew Sprowle is dead. and that they are inoculating the blacks for the smallpox. His Lordship, before the departure of the fleet from Norfolk harbor, had two of those wretches inoculated and sent ashore, in order to spread the infection, but it was happily prevented.

Such riots would be the last of their kind in North America, as with the invention of the smallpox vaccine by English scientist Edward Jenner in 1798 (which quickly spread to the United States and received widespread adoption there) smallpox gradually receded as a major disease. While there is documentation that Sprowle supported inoculation, it is unclear if he himself or his enslaved workforce were vaccinated yet the rumors linking him and his fellow Scots to some fantastical inoculation plot would persist beyond his death.

== Chairmen of the Board of Trade ==
In 1769 a group of wealthy merchants gathered in Williamsburg to set rules with the intention "to expedite the mode and shorten the expense of doing business". They adopted and fixed specific days during April, July, October, and November to engage in their collective business. Their rules sought to limit the period for setting the rate of exchange and for payment of all money contracts and give the group an organized voice with which to approach the House of Burgesses and the colonial Lieutenant Governor. For their leader they elected Andrew Sprowle. One of the first meeting led to the group, agreeing a non-importation agreement not import tea, glass, or paint into Virginia, until the Townshend Acts or duties, were repealed. Andrew Sprowle as the elected leader of the merchants association was a prominent signatory to the agreement. After signing, the association walked in procession from the capital rotunda to Raleigh's Tavern where Sprowle and moderator Peyton Randolph led the group in numerous loyal toasts to the King, the Queen etc.

== Marriage to Katherine Leslie Hunter ==
Katherine Leslie Hunter was from Glasgow, Scotland and had come to colonial America with her first husband, James Hunter, a merchant, whom she married on 2 June 1754 in Glasgow. Together they settled in the Chesapeake Bay area and had had seven children. Katherine would have known Andrew Sprowle, for her husband James was his nephew. She later testified that James Hunter died 12 October 1774 and further stated that, " on the Twenty ninth day of October, one thousand seven hundred and seventy five she intermarried with Andrew Sprowle of Gosport in Virginia Merchant." On the day of her wedding to Andrew Sprowle, Katherine wrote to her daughter Katherine Hunter, then attending finishing school in Glasgow, Scotland, to stress diligence in her studies and the utility of practical subjects, "Let you Continue with Miss Logan. Apply Close to the Shop writing & arithmetick [arithmetic] which you don't mention & you'll find one of the most agreeable & useful Branches of Education next to reading& writing & Spelling, so I hope you will attend after this..." She then reminded her daughter of her obligation to her great-uncle Andrew Sprowle, "How grateful ought you & all of us to be to such a benefactor, Be sure to write Him one of your best Letters of thanks ... "Like the vast majority of Scottish merchants and their factors in Virginia and Maryland, Andrew and Katherine Sprowle were supporters of the crown. Katherine and Andrew would retain ties to their mother country to the end of their lives." She was well known to Governor Dunmore (see thumbnail) in Gosport, Katherine hosted regular balls at the British barracks during which servicemen and Loyalist civilians mingled freely.

== Revolutionary War ==
Sprowle's contributions during the American Revolutionary War were largely to provide extensive material and logistical support for the British Royal Navy. Early in the War, the Elizabeth River Sprowle's Gosport shipyard was occupied by the ships of Lord Dunmore, Royal Governor of Virginia. There Lord Dunmore was hosted by Sprowle, a personal friend and Tory supporter (Loyalist), at his residence, resulting in Gosport being "virtually the Royal capital of Virginia."

On the defensive, Dunmore established martial law and fortified his position in Virginia. At Gosport on 29 October 1775 Katherine wrote her daughter,

Indeed Gosport is the only place in the country which holds all the friends of the Government Army & Navy. We are all one family & your worthy friend Mr. [Andrew] Sprowle the Father of all & no one does anything without His advice & Direction, even the Governor himself, who stiles Himself Lieutenant Governor of Gosport. The Officers of the Army & Navy spend their Evenings here & we often have Balls in the Store House where they all Lodge, the old Gentleman Says I am Directress of both the Army & Navy, as passes & permits are asked by me.

Lord Dunmore was later driven from the area by the Continental Army during the Battle of Great Bridge (9 December 1775). Following the British defeat at Great Bridge, Dunmore forces were forced out of Norfolk and onto British ships off shore, here he hoped to launch guerilla raids on rebel plantations using the flotilla as a floating base camp. Smallpox and possibly typhus quickly broke out among those packed aboard these vessels. Many have speculated, the crammed conditions in the ships of Dunmore's fleet of Loyalist refugees, former slaves, soldiers and sailors made these vessels floating vectors for disease.

Andrew Sprowle was "petrified about being labeled a Loyalist"and acknowledged his main interest was "self preservation". In an intercepted letter, dated 1 November 1775 which he wrote to fellow Scot, George Brown, Sprowle conveyed both his anxiety and fear, "the Virginians" were "all against the Scots men," often threatening "to Exterpate them." Another letter from Sprowle to fellow Scottish merchant Peter Peterson, of Greenock Scotland, in late 1775, provides a glimpse of his increasing worry and apprehension as the situation of Lord Dunmore and Norfolk Loyalist community further deteriorated.

About 300 regulars of the 14th regiment at Gosport, in my storehouse; able to defend themselves against 1000, and more, of our Virginia men. More forces expected daily from [Saint] Augustine. Most astonishing no letters since May from the ministry to Lord Dunmore; but some forces, and ships of war, daily looked for from Britain. God send them soon. While the soldiers remains at Gosport, I am safe.

These intercepted letters quickly came into the hands of Norfolk Committee of Safety, and were widely published in whole or in part. Sprowle's name also surfaced in a letter from Norfolk merchant, Walter Hatton, of 21 November 1775, to fellow Loyalist Nathaniel Coffin in Boston. In his letter Hatton castigated "the Damned Committee", spoke of the "diluted people", then instructed the recipient, "My letters please direct to the care of Mr. Sprowle Norfolk (or Gosport rather) who will forward them & what money you may have of mine in your hands."

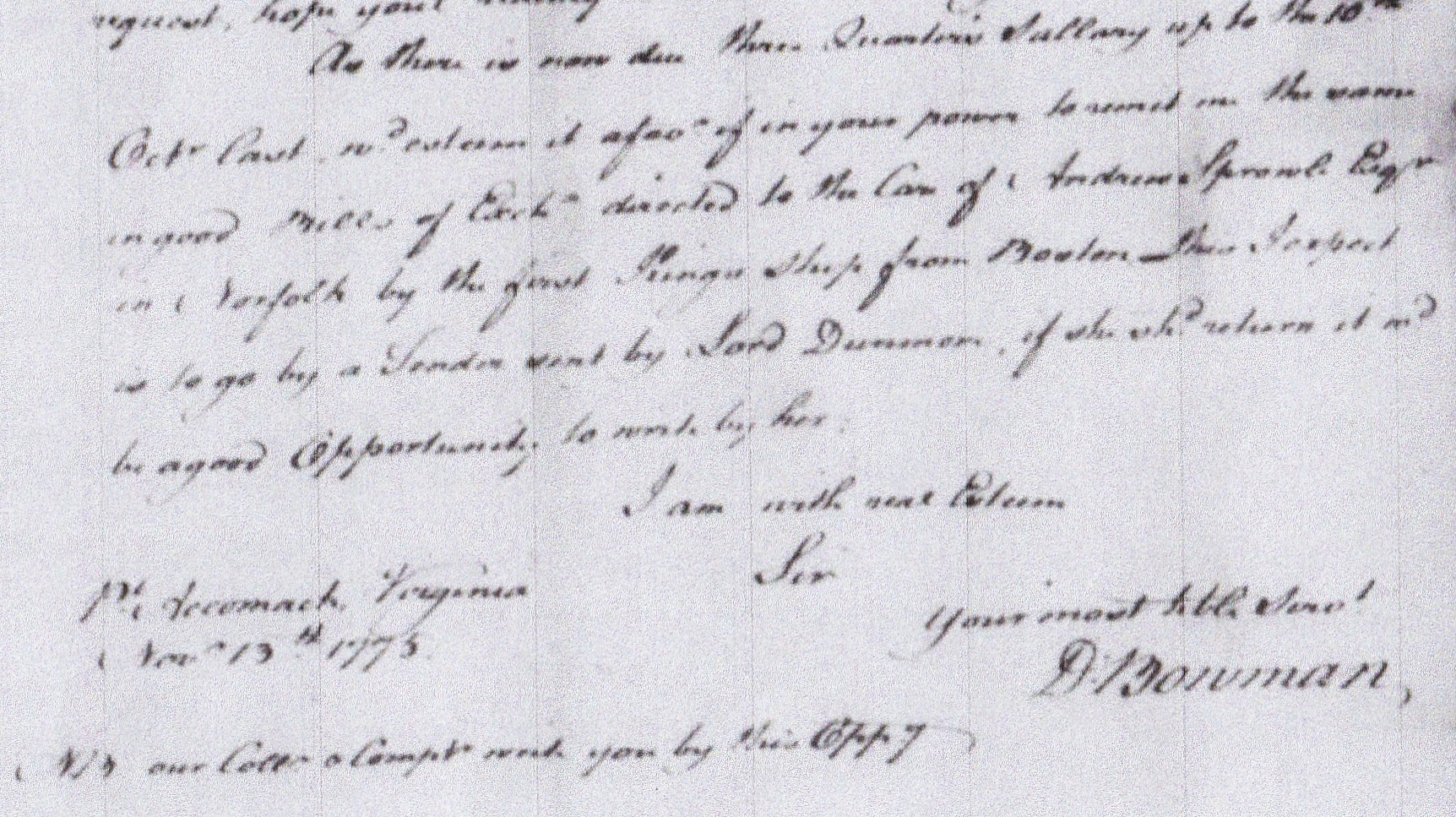
Intercepted mail, D. Bowman to Nathaniel Coffin, 13 November 1775, re. Directing mail and bills of exchange to Andrew Sprowle and worsening situation in Norfolk area

On 16 November 1775 Lord Dunmore entered Norfolk and administered the oath of allegiance to the King and government to the Scottish merchants. This and the intercepted letters solidified existing suspicion of Scottish merchants and tended to show Sprowle "and the other merchants were as deceitful as the most skeptical radicals believed." Revolutions often force those who equivocate to make a choice. In the end, Sprowle, like many Loyalists though reluctant to risk his commercial ties, his status as a British Naval Agent, and his relationship with Lord Dunmore, remained loyal to the crown. After the war, John Murray, Lord Dunmore, vouched for Sprowle's fidelity during the war.

Andrew Sproule Esquire late of Gosport in Virginia, John Hunter of the same place and John Hunter Junior, Esquire and Mr. Thomas McCulloch the entire same place, manifested the warmest attachment to his Majesty's Government during the Late Rebellion in America. That Mr. Hunter served as officer in the Troops raised by me in Virginia and Mr. Sproule and Mr. McCulloch were equally zealous and active in promoting his Majesty's interest and Service in that Country., Dunmore 23rd July 1785

In Katherine Sprowle's statement to the Loyalty Board, of 10 October 1785, she confirmed both their loyalty and services to the crown.

When Lord Dunmore came to Gosport in 1775 Mr. Sprowle supplied the British Troop with Barracks and kept open House for all officers of the Fleet & Army. She was not married to him at this time - She married him in October 6, 1775 at Mr. Sprowle's House at Gosport before they went on board ship. Says what service she could render to the British and none to the Americans - never in any manner abetted their cause.

Katherine testified that in revenge for Andrew Sprowle support of British troops, "on 4 January 1776, a party from the Rebel American Army then a Norfolk went to Gosport, where they burned and destroyed almost every building in the place - about the same time another went to his plantation at Sewell's Point where they carried off the Slaves, drove off his stock of cattle, burnt his barn and destroyed all his crops" Captain John Balat, a British officer, with the 14th Regiment of Foot, left, the following recollection of Andrew Sprowle, during the war.

His attachment and loyalty was conspicuous to the Government was conspicuous. On the arrival of troops he voluntarily gave up Houses for their accommodation, and upon all occasions endeavored to make our situation comfortable as possible. This conduct made him exceedingly obnoxious to the Rebels. After the unfortunate affair of the Battle of Great Bridge; he notwithstanding his age and infirmities was obligated to take refuge on Board of Ship, where he had the mortification to see his property destroyed by fire.

John Hunter Jr., Andrew Sprowle's grandnephew and Katherine's son, a captain in the Queens Loyal Virginia Regiment, fought at Battle of Great Bridge; he later testified, "he lived under the care and direction of his uncle,[Andrew Sprowle] till the beginning of the late troubles then influenced by the example of his relations ...cordially hazarded life and his future prospects in endeavoring to support its interest and authority."

In his summation of Andrew Sprowle's losses incurred during the American Revolution, Thomas McCulloch, gave the total amount as, £20,703.01, Sterling

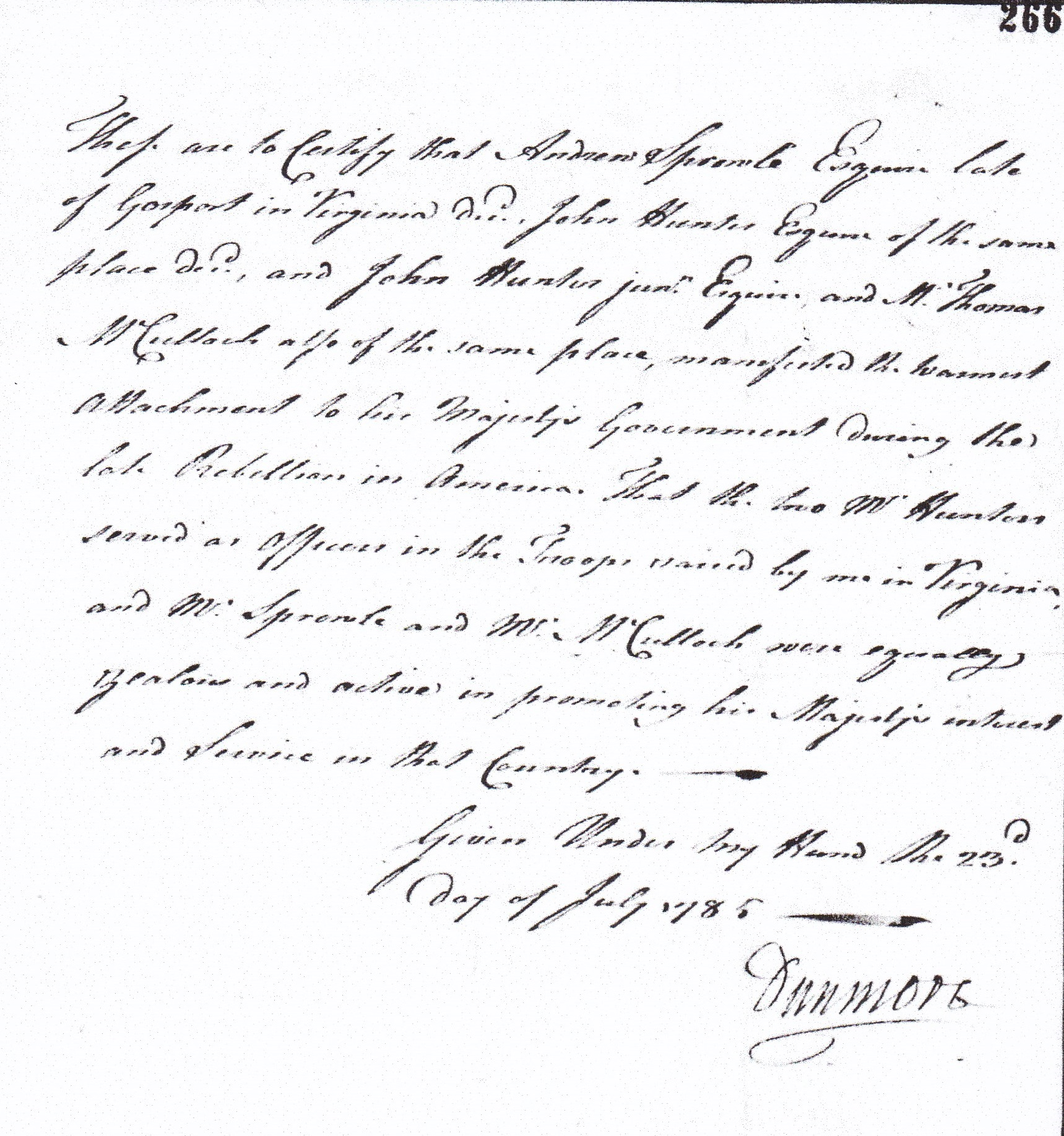
Statement of John Murray, Lord Dunmore, in support of the Loyalist claim of Andrew Sprowle, 23 July 1785

== Death ==
Sprowle attempted to flee the Commonwealth of Virginia on 25 May 1776, after it fell to the Continental Army, but was unsuccessful. Following the British retreat from Portsmouth in May 1776, Sprowle along with other Loyalists accompanied Dunmore's fleet to Gwynn's Island (now Mathews County, Virginia).His widow Katherine recalled "The distress were too much for Mr.Sprowle's advanced age. He fell sacrifice May 29, 1776 still on board a vessel a vessel at Gwyns Island." That same day Sprowle had signed two codicils to his 1774 will acknowledging Katherine as his lawful spouse and heir along with his grandnephew John Hunter Jr. While some claim Sprowle was buried in an unmarked grave, this is disputed. A Patriot officer who came on Gwynn Island shortly after the departure of the British fleet reported viewing Sprowle's grave.

On arrival we found the enemy had evacuated the place with the greatest precipitation and were struck with horror, the number of dead bodies in a state of putrefaction, strewed all the way from their battery to Cherry Point about two miles in length, without a shovelful of earth upon them; others gasping for life and some crawled to the water's edge, who could only make known their distress by beckoning to us. By the smallpox and other malignant disorders which raged on board the fleet for many months past, it is clear they have since their arrival at Gwynn's Island lost near 500 souls. I myself counted 130 graves (or rather a hole, loosely covered with earth) close together, large enough to contain a corporal guard. One in the middle was neatly done up with turf, and is supposed to contain the remains of the late Lord of Gosport.

Thomas McCulloch, Sprowle's business manager, summarized his patron's death, thus, "that the said Andrew Sprowle continued with the fleet under his Majesty's Governor till the last of May 1776, when at Gwyns Island among the wreck of his property he died..."

In 1916 historian H.J.Eckenrode, wrote of Sprowle, he had "no real partisanship, merely desiring to live in peace; but it was not possible in Norfolk for a man of his position to occupy a neutral attitude during the latter months of 1775. Sprowle could not bring himself to abandon his property and seek safety in the interior like the majority of Norfolk people of patriot sympathies. He stuck by his goods and paid for it." Writing in 1991, Thomas Costa, concluded Sprowle was Loyalist, albeit a somewhat reluctant one, " [He] probably decided that his sympathies lay with the British. As a merchant, one of his main considerations was with the stoppage of commerce. He, too, saw the coming conflict as a threat to property, but viewed the patriots as the chief enemies to property." As Loyalists Andrew and Katherine Sprowle were by no means alone, modern scholarship estimates about 20% of the population remained loyal to Great Britain and by 1783, about 60,000 had fled to other parts of the British Empire.

== Deaths in Sprowle's Enslaved Workforce ==
Thomas McCulloch in his meticulous account of Andrew Sprowle's financial losses, notated the horrific demise of Sprowle's large enslaved workforce to disease and abduction. McCulloch's concern though was confined exclusively to calculating his employer's financial losses as a requisite for future financial reimbursement. McCulloch testified "of the Negros some were saved and carried to New York but 29 Negros were lost by Death owning to the contagious Distemper got on board the fleet or by being taken off by the Rebels of these he has heard of one in the back country and that person in whose possession he is willing to pay for him. [He] Says 25 of the Negros died of contagious distemper between December 1775 & July 1776 and were taken together at £1,200 Sterling." Sir Andrew Snape Hamond, 1st Baronet, Commander of his Majesty's Ship HMS Roebuck (1774), later indicated that most of the black troops "had been inoculated before they left Norfolk and that they got through the disorder with great success, only to be assailed by a fever, perhaps typhus, when they reached Gwynn's Island. The surviving British documentation confirmed three individuals, Dorothy Bush age 36, Venus Profit age 50 and James Knapp age 12, in 1783 were safely relocated to Canada. Venus Profit and Dorothy Bush are referred to as "Venus' and "Moll" in Andrew Sprowle's 1774 will, see thumbnail. The British records for Dorothy Bush aka "Doll", state she was, "Formerly Slave to Andrew Sproule, Portsmouth. Left 7 years ago, Certificate from General Birch. She says her master Andrew Sproule [Sprowle]gave her freedom before he died which was seven years ago." If so then Dorothy Bush, was the only enslaved individual, Andrew Sprowle released from bondage and one of the last people to see him alive.

== Legacy ==
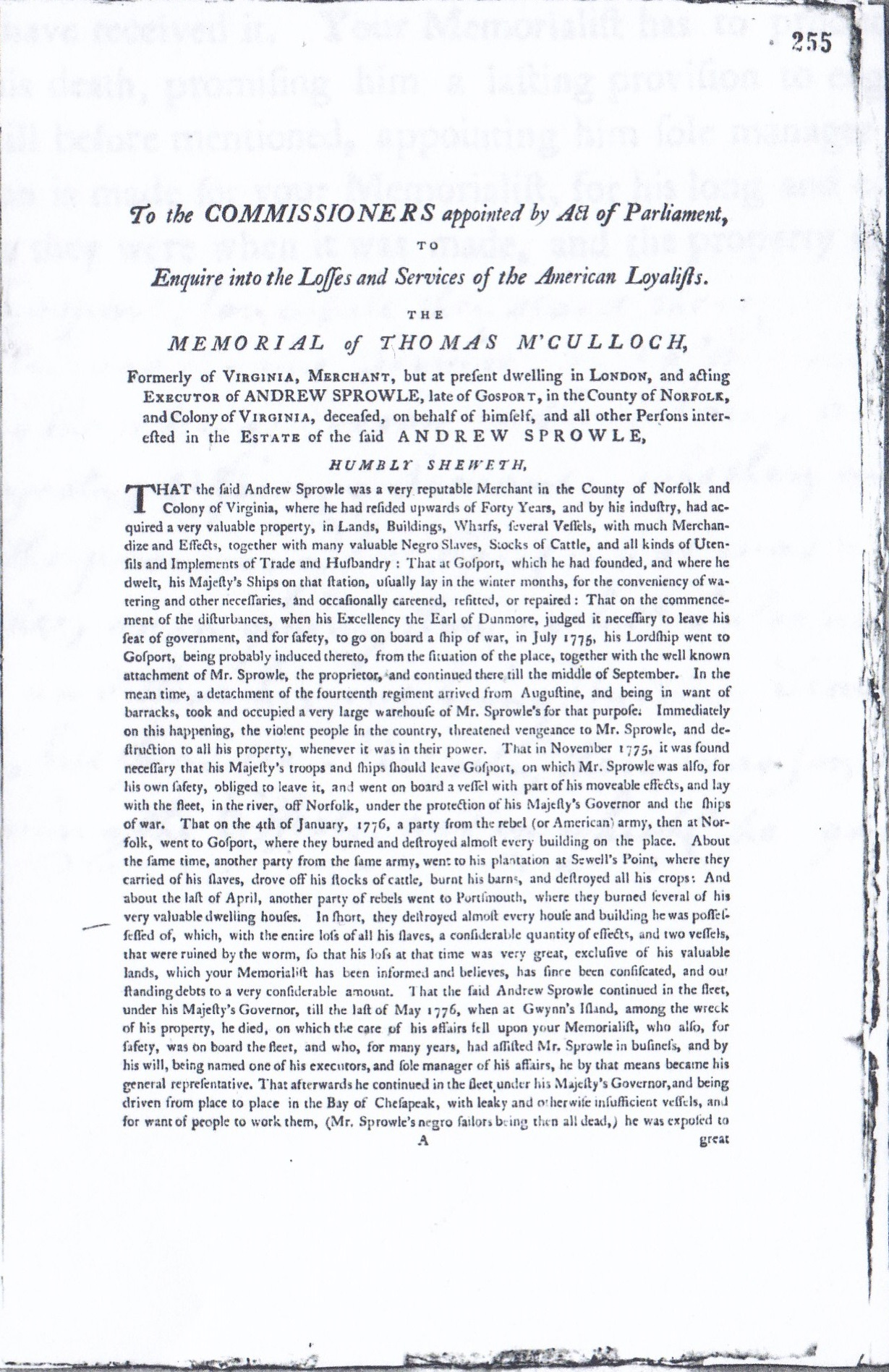
Katherine Hunter Sprowle's claim to the British Loyalist re estate of Andrew Sprowle, 26 Jan 1784, p.255

Following her husband's death, Katherine Sprowle immediately sought assistance to regain Andrew Sprowle estate or reimbursement. On 28 June 1776 she wrote to naval officer, Captain Andrew Snape Hamond RN, who commanded Lord Dunmore's fleet, empathizing her plight and resolve for restitution. "How Mr. Sprowle had been harried & fallen a sacrifice...his poor widow whose last advice was to fly but not until she had settled his affairs..."

After the Revolutionary War, Thomas McCulloch, acting for Katherine and her son John Hunter Jr., calculated Sprowle's total property losses as £20,703.01. They also submitted an itemized list of debts due Andrew Sprowle as totaling £10,703. Katherine relentlessly pleaded for help from the British Loyalty Board, Lord Duncanon, the State of Virginia, and even Benjamin Franklin and Thomas Jefferson, where she achieved some limited success. Despite destruction wrought by war, a small amount of Sprowle's estate survived, e.g. part of the Gosport shipyard and at least a portion of his enslaved workforce. Records of the Virginia House of Burgesses, reflect the council advised the Governor of Virginia on 8 July 1780, "to employ some proper person to purchase that part of the estate of Andrew Sprowle known commonly by the name of Gosport in Norfolk County for the purpose of a shipyard & able male slaves of the estate for the public, to work in a lead mine." Other council records dated 16 November 1779 state that the "auditor be directed to issue McLauchlan as attorney of Andrew Sprowle deceased, for so much money as has been accounted for the hire arising from his slaves." The state auditor directed the Treasury pay the "said Andrew Sprowle the sum of £ 111.68 being in full for the hire of stores and Slaves." Yet another directed that "Katherine Sprowle now Douglas and John Hunter, [Andrew Sprowle's grandnephew] 'receive the Negros now in public labor belonging to the estate of Andrew Sprowle and give order for their delivery." In her quest for compensation, Katherine Sprowle, proved to be a formidable, outspoken advocate, an educated and fearless women in an age when females "were expected to be humble and differential..." On March 6, 1783 the Loyalist board finally ruled in Katherine Sprowle's favor, they confirmed her marriage and praised her husband's efforts on behalf of the British government, but granted her a smaller pension than she expected.
