= John Mein =

John Mein may refer to:

- John Gordon Mein, U.S. ambassador
- John Mein (publisher)
