= Thomas Melvill (American patriot) =

American patriot

- Portrait of Melville, ca. 1820s

Member of the Massachusetts State Legislature
- In office 1832

Personal details
- Born: January 16, 1751 Boston, Massachusetts
- Died: September 16, 1832 (aged 81) Boston, Massachusetts
- Resting place: King's Chapel Burying Ground
- Spouse: Pricilla Scollay (m. 1774)
- Relations: Herman Melville (grandson)
- Children: 11
- Parent(s): Allan Melvill; Jean Cargill
- Education: College of New Jersey

Thomas Melvill or Thomas Melville (January 16, 1751 – September 16, 1832) was a merchant, member of the Sons of Liberty, participant in the Boston Tea Party, a major in the American Revolutionary War, a longtime fireman in the Boston Fire Department, state legislator, and paternal grandfather of writer Herman Melville.

== Life and work ==
Melvill was born on January 16, 1751, in Boston, Massachusetts, to Scottish-born merchant Allan Melvill (1728–1761) and Jean Cargill (ca. 1730–1759). His paternal grandfather, Thomas Melvill was minister of Scoonie, Fifeshire, Scotland.

Melvill was orphaned at the age of 10 and was raised by his maternal grandmother, Mrs. Mary Cargill, a relative of the eccentric Dr. John Abernethy. He intended to become a minister, and attended the College of New Jersey (now Princeton University), from which he graduated in 1769. In July 1773, he was awarded an honorary Master of Arts degree by Harvard College.

Melvill was a close friend of Samuel Adams.

== Career ==
"When the citizens of Boston began to evince a determination to resist the arbitrary, offensive and onerous exactions of the British government, Melvill was conspicuous among the ardent and gallant young men of the capital, for his zeal and intrepidity, during that momentous advent of ... national independence."

Melvill participated in the Boston Tea Party, "that immortal band which in December, 1773, in presence of the Royal fleet, boarded the tea ships in Boston harbor, and threw their rich cargoes into the ocean." In March 1776, when "the British fleet was driven from Boston harbor, Captain Melvill discharged the first guns at the hostile ships, from his battery, at Nantasket." During the war he "served in the Rhode Island campaigns of 1777 and 1779."

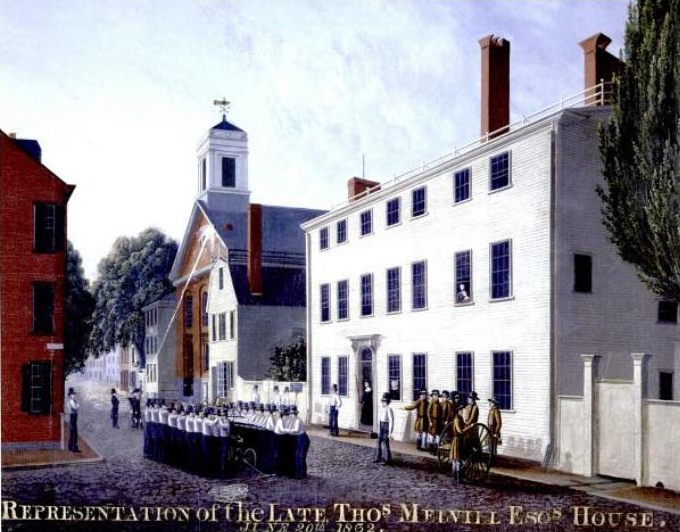
Thomas Melville house, Green Street, Boston, 1832

=== Post Revolutionary War ===
After the war, he worked as a naval officer (1786–1820) and surveyor (ca. 1796) of the Port of Boston at the Boston Custom House on State Street. (Customs houses were administered by three political appointees: the collector, naval officer, and surveyor. They supervised a staff that received cargo manifests from incoming ships, inspected cargoes, assessed and collected customs duties for remittance to the United States Department of the Treasury, and fined those who tried to evade paying duties. The collector, naval officer, and surveyor were paid a portion of the duties and fines they collected, making them lucrative and sought-after positions.)

"When the custom house was established in Boston, in 1786, he was appointed surveyor; in 1789 was made inspector, and ... in 1814, he was appointed naval officer of the port." He served as a town fireward (1779–1825);, and for twenty-five years was chairman of the board; an incorporator of Boston's Scots Charitable Society (1786); a founder of the Massachusetts General Hospital (est.1811); and president of the Massachusetts Charitable Society (ca.1825-1826); "He was in the state legislature in 1832." Melvill lived in Boston's West End "in an old wooden house on the south side of Green Street, between Staniford Street and Bowdoin Square. ... It was a wooden house of two stories."

In 1830, Oliver Wendell Holmes Sr. published a poem entitled "The Last Leaf", which was inspired in part by Melvill, "the last of the cocked hats." Holmes would later write that Melvill had reminded him of "a withered leaf which has held to its stem through the storms of autumn and winter, and finds itself still clinging to its bough while the new growths of spring are bursting their buds and spreading their foliage all around it."

=== Death ===
When Major Melvill retired from the fire department, the Columbian Centinel for 31 October 1832 wrote, "his associates presented him with a Silver Pitcher, as a token of personal respect, and a public testimonial of his faithful services." In addition, the younger firemen named an engine for him. When a fire broke out at noon on 7 September 1832, in a brick building on Green Street, opposite the Melvill house, the eighty-one-year-old major responded in character. He was active by "furnishing the firemen with refreshments, having an open house to all of them," wrote the Firemen's Advocate. But in the events he "took a violent cold, which terminated in the diarrhea; and owing to his advanced age, and the violence of the disorder, medicine had no effect in checking its progress." The major died on Sunday evening, 16 September. One of the city's most prominent and colorful citizens, he was mourned and eulogized for weeks. Firemen paid him a meaningful tribute, the Boston Evening Gazette reported on 22 September. "The members of the 'Melville Fire Association,' attached to the Melville Engine, No. 13, met at their Engine House - attended the funeral - and voted to wear the usual badge of mourning for thirty days."

== Personal life ==
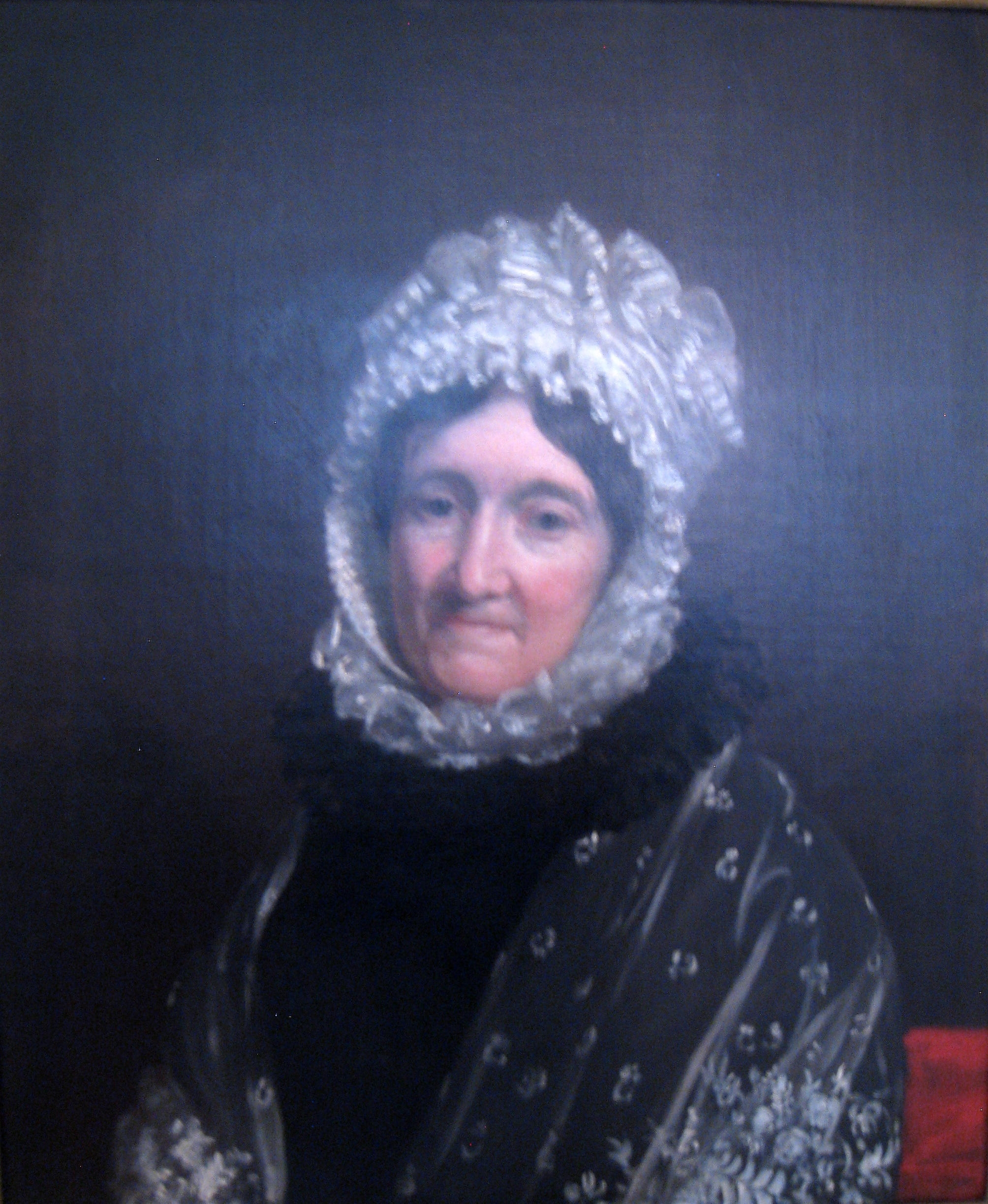
Portrait of Priscilla Scollay Melvill, wife of Thomas Melvill, by Francis Alexander, 1820s

In 1774, Melvill married Priscilla Scollay (1755–1833), the daughter of prominent Boston merchant John Scollay, and sister of William Scollay (1756–1809), a developer and militia officer. Together, Thomas and Priscilla were the parents of 11 children, including:

- Thomas Melvill (1776–1845), who married Françoise Raymonde Eulogie Marie des Douleurs Lamé-Fleury (1781–1814) in 1802. After her death, he married Mary Anna Augusta Hobart (1796–1884), a widow, in 1815.
- Mary Melvill (1778–1859), who married John De Wolf (1779–1872), a brother of U.S. Senator James De Wolf.
- Nancy Wroe Melvill (1780–1813)
- Allan Melvill (1782–1832), who married Maria Gansevoort (1791–1872), the daughter of Gen. Peter Gansevoort, in 1814. Allan and Maria were the parents of Herman Melville.
- Priscilla Melvill (1784–1862), who did not marry.

=== Portrait ===
Melvill's portrait was painted by Francis Alexander in the 1780s. It is now in the collection of the Bostonian Society, along with a portrait attributed to Benjamin Blyth, and the tricorn hat "said to have been worn by Major Melvill at the Boston Massacre."

== Sources ==
- Parker, Hershel (1996). Herman Melville: A Biography. Volume One, 1819-1852, Johns Hopkins University Press.

== Images ==
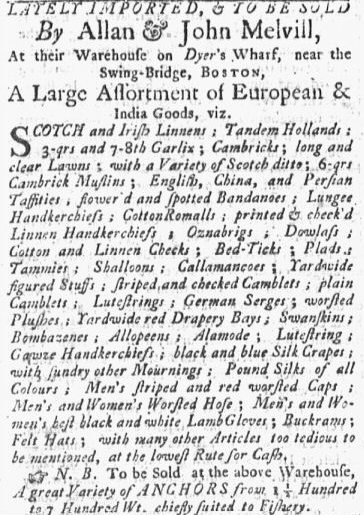
Advertisement for Allan & John Melvill, merchants, Boston, 1758. Allan Melvill was the father of Thomas Melvill

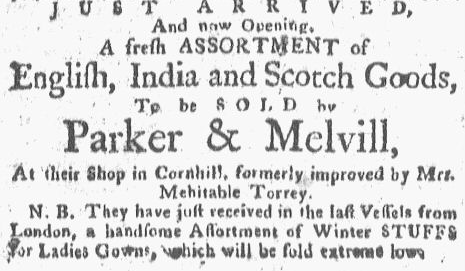
Advertisement for Parker & Melvill, Cornhill, Boston, 1773

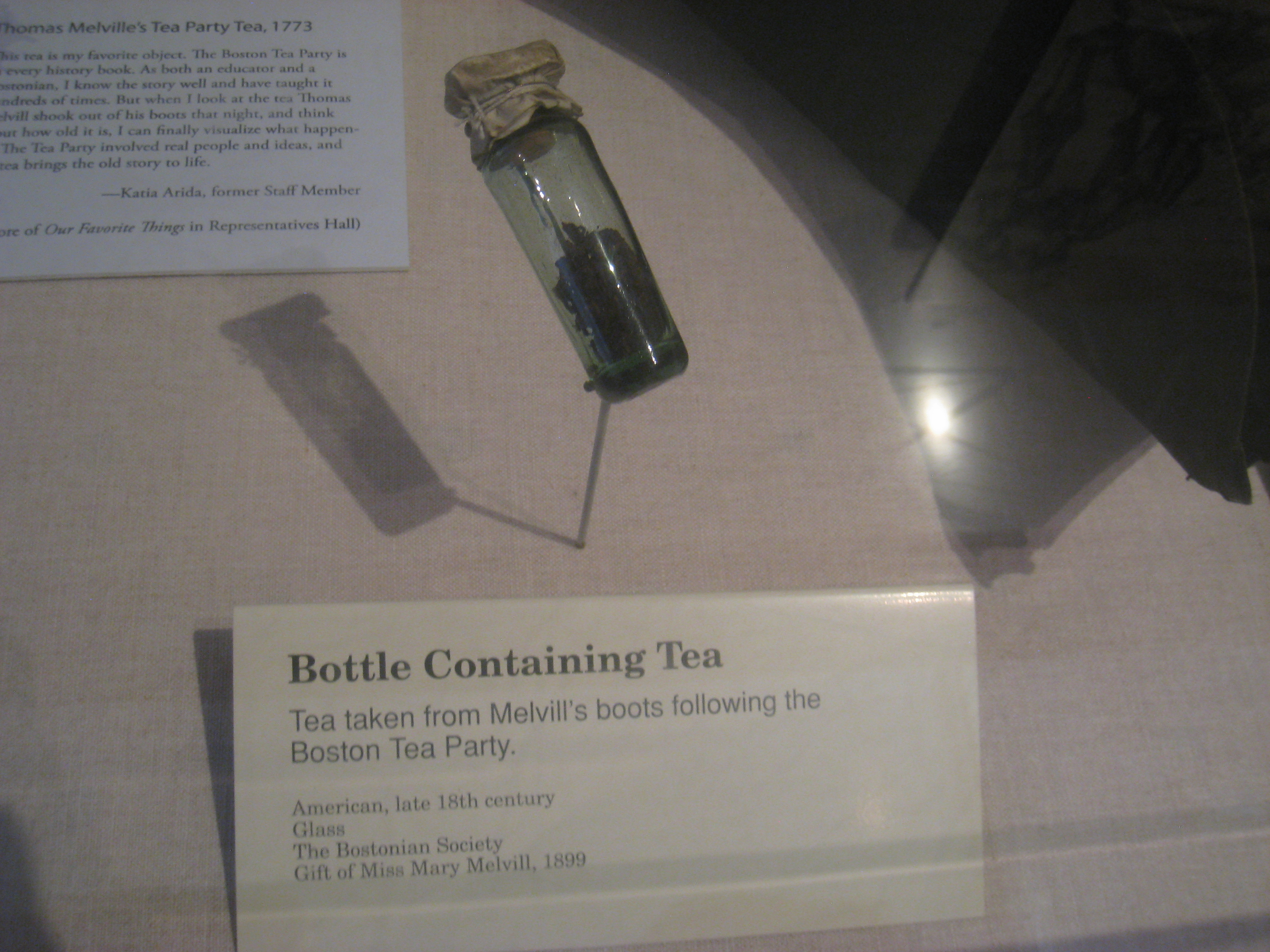
Tea taken from the boots of Thomas Melvill, after the Boston Tea Party in 1773 (Old State House Museum, Boston)

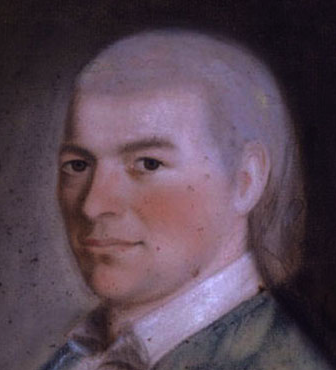
Portrait of Thomas Melvill, ca.1770s-1780s (Bostonian Society)
