= Boston Chronicle =

Loyalist newspaper in colonial Boston, Massachusetts

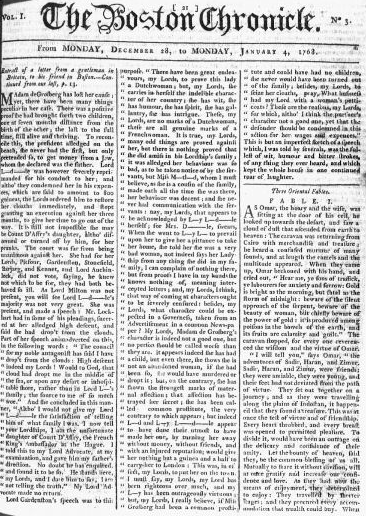
December 28, 1767 issue of the Boston Chronicle

The Boston Chronicle was an American colonial newspaper published briefly from December 21, 1767, until 1770 in Boston, Massachusetts. The publishers, John Mein and John Fleeming, were both from Scotland. The Chronicle was a Loyalist paper in the time before the American Revolution.

In its second year, Mein printed names in the paper that accused some colonial merchants of breaking a British nonimportation agreement. In response, Mein's name appeared on a list of merchants who violated the trade agreement. Mein retaliated by accusing the Merchants' Committee of using the nonimportation agreement for illegal profiteering. The irritated readership ransacked the offices of the Chronicle, and ultimately, it ceased operations in 1770.

"The Printers of the Boston Chronicle return thanks to the gentlemen, who have so long favored them with their subscriptions, and now inform them that, as the Chronicle, in the present state of affairs, cannot be cafrried on, either for their entertainment or the emolument of the Printers, it will be discontinued for some time." (printed June 25, 1770)
