= Scots Charitable Society of Boston =

U.S. charitable institution

The Scots Charitable Society (est.1657) of Boston, Massachusetts, The oldest charitable institution in the Western Hemisphere, was established to provide relief for local, "needy Scot people, after proper investigation." It "enjoys the distinction of being the oldest Scots society in America." It "became the prototype for thousands of other groups" of private charity in America.

== History ==
=== 17th century ===
The founding members were: Robert Porteous, William Cossar, Alexander Simson, George Thomson, James Moore, James Grant, Thomas Dewar, John Clark, Peter Grant, John Kneeland, Thomas Polson, William Anderson, James Webster, William Gibson, Alexander Grant, Andrew Jamesone, William Ballantyne, William Speed, James Ingles, John Macdonald, Thomas Shearer, George Trumble, Alexander Bogle, John Bennett, James Adams, Malcome Makcallome, and John Mason. In 1657 they agreed:

' We ... for the releefe of our selves, and any other for the which wee may see cause, to make a box. ... None give less at ther entring then twelve pence and then quarterly to pay sixpence, and that this our benevolence is for the releefe of our selves being Scottishmen or for any of the Scottish nation whome we may see cause to helpe (not excluding the prudentiall care of the respective prudentiall townsmen whose God shall cast any of us or them, but rather as an addition thereunto) and it is agreed that there shall nothing be taken out of the box for the first sevin yeers for the releefe of any (the box being as yet in its minority), and further it is agreed that there shall be one Chosen (one of good report, fearing God, hateing covetousnes) quarterly to receive the dutyes of the said box and lykewise what Legacies may be left unto it, and that the first box maister shall give up all the revenues belonging unto the said box unto the next that is chosen, and so continue quarterly until) the Company may see any Inconvenience in it or cause to alter it, and it is agreed that our children shall have the same liberty with ourselves, they entring (when they are growne up) orderly, and it further agreed that those who doth willfully neglect to pay there dutys and have entred for the space of a twelve month togethir, shall have no benefite hereafter by the said box.

"Only twenty-seven years after the founding of the town of Boston the Scots had thought it necessary to establish a society for ... relief. ... The explanation is simple, for in 1652 the ship John and Sara arrived in Boston bringing two hundred and seventy-two Scotsmen, who had been taken prisoners by Cromwell. (Note: William Munroe (Scottish soldier) sailed on the John and Sarah.) As the quickest way of disposing of these, they were shipped off to the colonies to be sold to service for a longer or shorter time as the case might be. There was need for aid and so the original members of the society agreed to give 'as god shall move our harts' and their benevolence was directed toward the 'reliefe of our selves being Scottishmen or for any of the Scottish nation whom we may see cause to helpe.'

Members in the 17th century included George Jaffrey.

=== 18th century ===
"By the early eighteenth century, one of its major functions was the provision of relief to the aged on a long-term basis as a type of pension. For example, in 1718 a petition from James Maxwell was read. Mr. Maxwell who had been 'a Contributor while he was in capacity' was praying for relief in his old age. The society voted to give him 20 shillings immediately and an additional 10 shillings every quarter. Eliza Wilson, who died in 1756, had been relieved by the society for 23 years."

In 1785 the society officially incorporated; signatories were John Scollay, William Erving, James Swan, Thomas Melville, James Thompson, James Graham, William Doll, William Mc'Kean, Andrew Drummond, and John Young. Other members in the 18th century included bookbinder Andrew Barclay, Robert Campbell ("commander of the ship Truth and Daylight), John Mein, and John Smybert.

=== 19th century ===
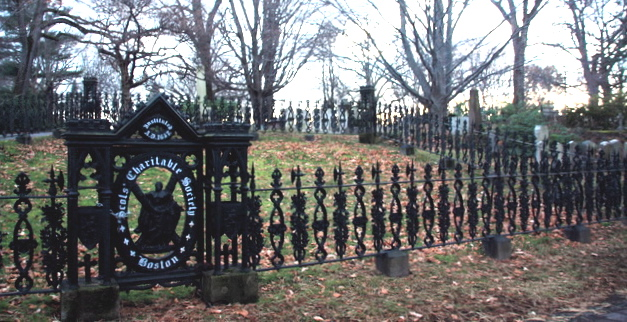
Lot of the Scots Charitable Society, Mount Auburn Cemetery (2009 photo)

On St. Andrew's Day in 1857 the group held a 200th anniversary supper at the Revere House hotel. The society's "president was escorted from his residence by the members of the society, some of whom, with himself, were dressed in the Highland costume. They were preceded by pipers, who played national airs. The meeting was most enthusiastic, and the president gave an excellent speech." "Addresses were made by Mr. Henry Grattan, H.B.M. Consul; Sir Charles Fox, builder of the Crystal Palace, London; J.D. Andrews, Esq.; Charles W. Story, Esq; Messrs. John C. Crowley, President of the Irish Charitable Society; James Cruickshanks, and others. Poems were read by Dr. William Wallace Morland and Jeffrey Brackett, Esq.; and national songs sung by various members of the Society and of the Caledonia Club. Letters were read by the Secretary from the Hon. Robert C. Winthrop, Samuel A. Eliot, Esq., and Dr. Holmes, regretting that they could not be present, and expressing sentiments of the warmest interest towards this the oldest of Charitable Societies in the States. After singing 'Auld Lang Syne' and dancing 'Ronald McDonald' the meeting adjourned."

"St. Andrew's Home was established by the society at 73 West Concord Street, and opened in 1869. There, unfortunate Scotch are received and cared for until employment is found."

By 1889 "the amount expended by the Society in charity was about £300; 351 applicants had asked for assistance and 306 had been relieved; and during the year several of our countrymen, who had been unable to find employment and were without means, were forwarded to their old homes in Scotland." The society's "permanent fund" totalled some $16,225. It maintained the "Scots Temporary Home" (a shelter in Boston on Camden Street) and a plot in the Mount Auburn Cemetery.

== See also ==
- Philanthropy in the United States
