= John Fleeming =

John Fleeming or John Fleming was a printer, publisher and bookseller in Boston, Massachusetts, in the 18th century.

== Biography ==
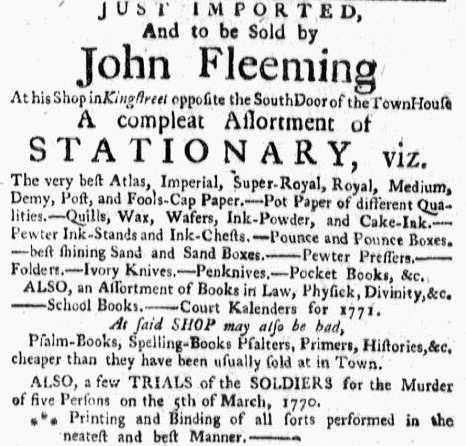
Advertisement for John Fleeming, "in King Street opposite the south door of the Town House," Boston 1771 (Boston Evening-Post)

Fleeming moved from Scotland to Boston around 1764. In 1765 he worked with William M'Alpine as a publisher/bookseller on Marlborough Street. A few years later, with John Mein he published the Boston Chronicle newspaper (1767–1770), as well as other titles, such as Bickerstaff's Boston Almanack. The partnership with Mein dissolved around 1770. In 1770 Fleeming married Alice Church (daughter of Boston merchant Benjamin Church).

In 1770 he attempted to issue "the first bible ever printed in America." In late 1770 or early 1771 he published an account of the trial following the Boston Massacre.

Fleeming sailed from Boston in 1773 on a ship that allegedly carried "a quantity of silver to the amount of 30,000 dollars ... from the Custom House here, being part of the revenue money which has so long been complained of as being unconstitutionally taken from us." In 1778 the Massachusetts General Court prohibited Fleeming (and many other Tories) from returning, being named in the Massachusetts Banishment Act of 1778.

He later travelled to the United States "as an agent for a commercial house. Afterwards he resided in France and died there, since the year 1800."

== See also ==
- List of booksellers in Boston
