= John Mein (publisher) =

- Born: John Mein; Edinburgh, Scotland
- Died: London, England
- Other name: -
- Occupations: Bookseller; newspaper publisher
- Title: -
- Spouse: -
- Family: -

John Mein (b. Edinburgh, Scotland; d. London, England) was a Boston, Massachusetts, bookseller and publisher in the time before the American Revolution. Mein started Boston's first circulating library, and with his business partner, John Fleeming, Mein published the Loyalist newspaper, the Boston Chronicle, the first semi-weekly in New England.

== Early years ==
Mein, son of John Mein, was born in Edinburgh where he received a good education before entering the bookselling business. In 1754, he apprenticed to Edinburgh bookseller, John Trail, and in 1760, he became Burgess and Guild Brother of Edinburgh. In 1761, Mein advertised a variety of children's books, and in November 1763, he announced that he would give up his business the following year.

== Career ==
Mein emigrated to Boston in October 1764 with a large quantity of books and linens. With Robert Sandeman (nephew of Robert Sandeman the theologian), Mein opened a store advertising English and Scottish prayer books, and beer from Edinburgh. Within the year, Mein dissolved the partnership with Sandeman.

Mein then opened his own bookstore that he named The London Bookstore, and began the first circulating library in Boston. His catalog advertised twelve hundred books, and he offered various payment schedules: "One Pound, Eight Shillings, lawful Mondey, per Year; Eighteen Shillings per Half-Year; or Ten and Eight Pence per Quarter." He sold the catalog for a shilling, and restricted loans to one book at a time. The library collection included works of history, literature, travel, law, medicine, and the like, in English and French, by authors such as:

- Joseph Addison
- Aesop
- Nathan Bailey
- Jane Barker
- Gilles Augustin Bazin
- Aphra Behn
- Robert Beverly
- William Biggs
- Thomas Blacklock
- Humphrey Bland
- Giovanni Boccaccio
- Jacques-Bénigne Bossuet
- Henry Brooke (writer)
- George Buchanan
- Edmund Burke
- Gilbert Burnet
- Thomas Burnet
- John Campbell (author)
- Miguel de Cervantes
- Pierre François Xavier de Charlevoix
- François de Chassepol
- William Rufus Chetwood
- John Cleland
- Mary Collyer
- William Congreve
- Claude Prosper Jolyot de Crébillon
- Campbell Dalrymple
- Daniel Defoe
- Pierre Desfontaines
- W.H. Dilworth
- Robert Dossie
- Jacques Du Bosc
- Jean-Baptiste Du Halde
- Thomas Dyche
- François-Ignace Espiard de la Borde
- George Farquhar
- François Fénelon
- Daniel Fenning
- Henry Fielding
- Samuel Foote
- Antoine-Yves Goguet
- Hannah Glasse
- Sarah Harrison
- Eliza Haywood
- Aaron Hill (writer)
- John Hill (author)
- Nathaniel Hooke
- David Hume
- Mary Johnson
- Samuel Johnson
- Charles Johnstone
- Jorge Juan y Santacilia
- Basil Kennett
- John Knox
- Alain-René Lesage
- Roger L'Estrange
- Edmund Ludlow
- George Lyttelton, 1st Baron Lyttelton
- Philippe Macquer
- Giovanni Paolo Marana
- Jean-François Marmontel
- John Milton
- Molière
- Mary Wortley Montagu
- Montesquieu
- Edward Moore (dramatist)
- Charles Morrell
- Frederik Ludvig Norden
- Thomas Otway
- Eliza Parsons
- Alexander Pope
- John Potter (archbishop)
- Richard Rawlinson
- Samuel Richardson
- William Robertson (historian)
- Charles Rollin
- Jean de la Roque
- Jean-Jacques Rousseau
- Nicholas Rowe (writer)
- Henry Saxby
- Marie de Rabutin-Chantal, marquise de Sévigné
- William Shakespeare
- John Shebbeare
- Frances Sheridan
- Algernon Sidney
- Tobias Smollett
- Antonio de Solís y Ribadeneyra
- Maximilien de Béthune, Duke of Sully
- Jonathan Swift
- Antonio de Ulloa
- Miguel Venegas
- Réné-Aubert Vertot
- Voltaire
- Joseph Warton
- John Wright

Periodicals

- The Adventurer
- American Magazine and Historical Chronicle
- Annual Register
- The Connoisseur (newspaper)
- The Critical Review
- The Guardian (1713)
- Herald, or Patriot Proclaimer
- The London Magazine
- The Rambler
- The Spectator (1711)
- Tatler (1709)
- The World

In December 1767, to increase business, Mein started up The Boston Chronicle with Fleeming. Fleeming (or Fleming), the other partner in the firm, Mein and Fleeming, was also a "Scotchman". They also printed several books and almanacks, including the almanac Mein and Fleeming's register for New-England and Nova Scotia.

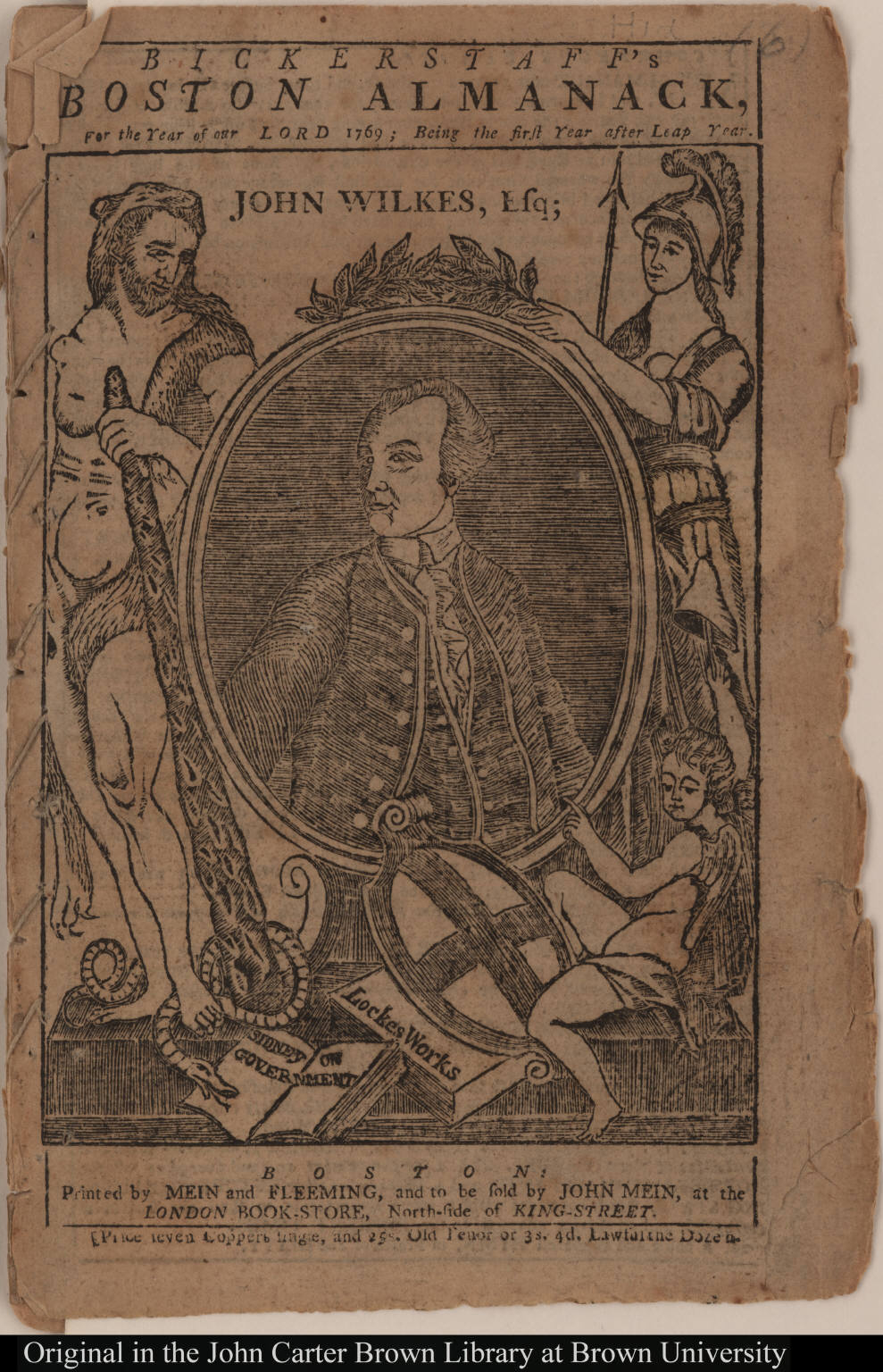
Bickerstaff's Boston Almanack, 1769. Printed by Mein and Fleeming, and to be sold by John Mein at the London Book-Store, North-side of King-Street, Boston

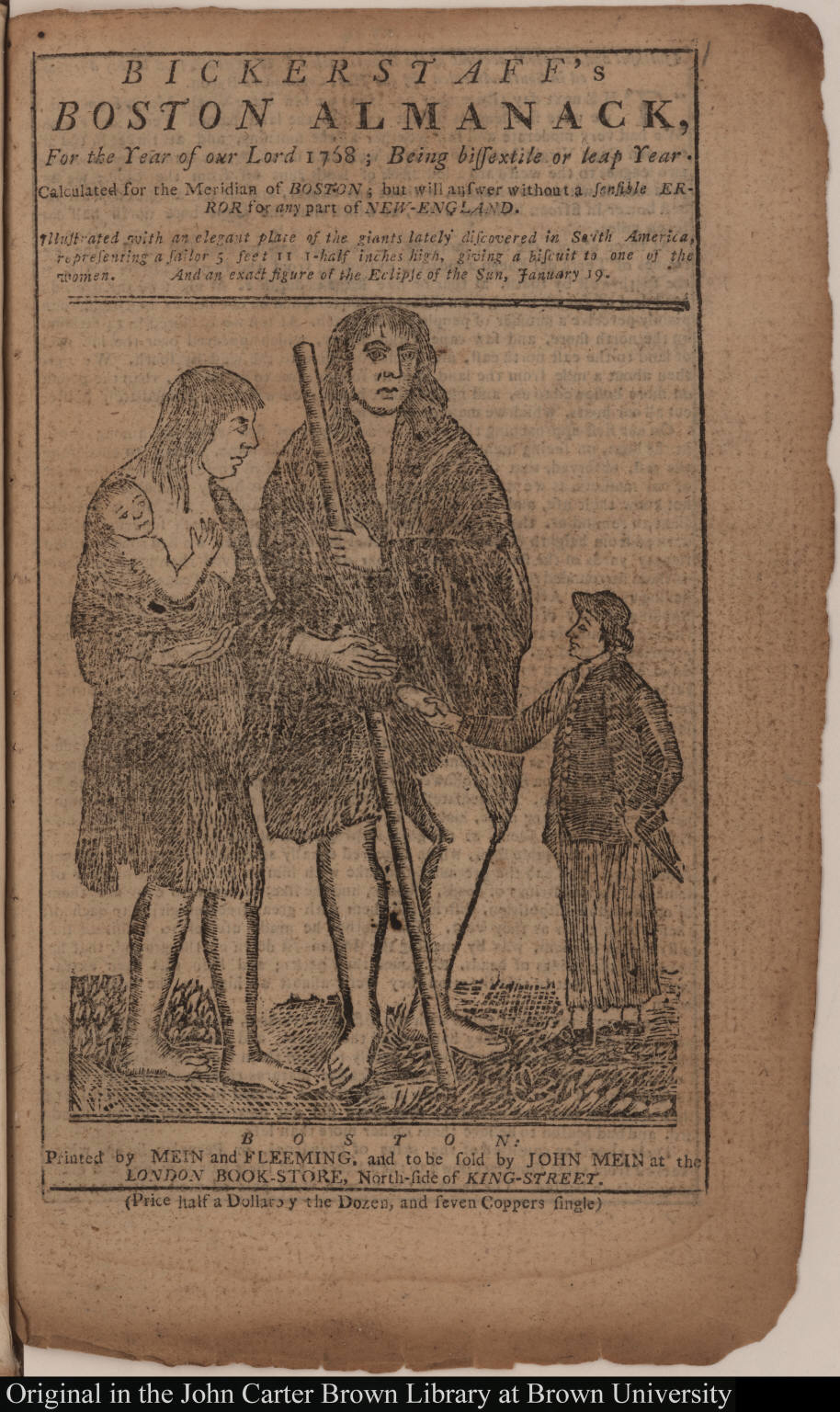
Bickerstaff's Boston Almanack, 1768. Printed by Mein and Fleeming, and to be sold by John Mein at the London Book-Store, North-side of King-Street, Boston

The Boston Chronicle was a Tory paper and began by publishing articles from London critical of William Pitt who was the Whig’s hero. The Boston Gazette responded with a letter (01/18/1768) probably written by James Otis attacking the views of the Chronicle. Mein visited the office of the Gazette (01/25/1768) demanding to know who wrote the article. Benjamin Edes would not reveal the source of the letter. A day later Mein ran into Edes on the street and attacked him. James Otis representing Edes won an award of £70.

Opposed to boycotting goods subject to stamp duties, Mein wrote in the Chronicle in support of the colonial policy of the British government including, in 1769, lists of names that accused colonial merchants of breaking a British nonimportation agreement. In retaliation, Mein's name appeared on a list of merchants who violated the trade agreement. Mein responded by publishing another letter, this time accusing the Merchants' Committee (namely John Hancock, Thomas Cushing and James Otis) of using the nonimportation agreement for illegal profiteering. The irritated public ransacked the Chronicle and Mein's office on the 28th of October 1769. In the scuffle, Mein shot a grenadier. He escaped the crowd by taking the disguise of a british soldier, then sought safety on a ship in the harbor which sailed for Great Britain in November.

Previously, in July 1769, Thomas Longman, a supplier of books to both Mein and John Hancock, wrote the latter for a suggestion of a representative in Boston who would represent him in his attempts to obtain payment for books owed to him by Mein. Hancock, seeing this as a golden opportunity, offered himself. In October while Mein was travelling east to London, the Power of Attorney was travelling west to John Hancock.

Mein left New England 2000 pounds in debt. Upon reaching England, he made contact with Lord Dartmouth and gave his perspective of affairs in colonial Massachusetts. Thereafter, Mein spent a year in King's Bench Prison. Upon release, he wrote against the patriot movement in various London newspapers.

He returned to Boston where he was convicted for failing to meet his financial obligations, with no mention of the grenadier. He made an attempt at re-establishing his bookseller and library business with limited success. After spending some time in Boston's prison, Mein returned to England.

The Boston Chronicle was being operated by Mein’s partner, John Fleeming, and had stopped publishing the attacks on the patriots. In March 1770, John Hancock, represented by John Adams, was granted an attachment of £2000. The Sheriff subsequently accepted the pledges of Mein’s friends and the Chronicle stayed in business.

Finally in September 1770, Mein, unable to come to terms with his creditors, realized he had lost. In November, the Inferior Court ruled against him and the Supreme Court ruled against his appeal. John Hancock disposed of all of his assets but the creditors still received only 50% of what they were owed. John Hancock, however, had a great victory as he had destroyed a critic while undermining freedom of the press.

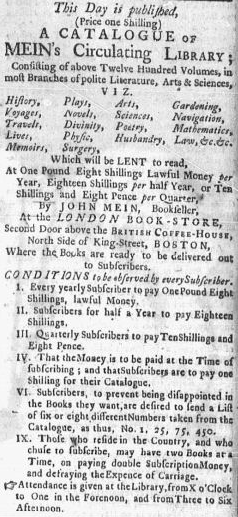
Advertisement for Mein's Circulating Library, at the London Book-Store, "second door above the British Coffee-House, North side of King-Street, Boston," Massachusetts, 1765

== Personal life ==
Mein was friends with Nathaniel Coffin, a surveyor and political figure in Lower Canada and a militia officer in Upper Canada. Mein belonged to the Scots Charitable Society of Boston. He died in London.

== Partial works ==
- 1765, A catalogue of Mein's circulating library, consisting of above twelve hundred volumes, in most branches of polite literature, arts and sciences; viz. history, voyages, travels, lives ... &c. ...
- 1767, Boston, October 22d, 1767 : Proposals for printing a new weekly paper, called the Boston chronicle. ... Subscriptions are taken in by John Mein at the London Book-Store, north side of King-Street.
- 1767, Table of the kings and queens, from the conquest of the Heptarchy, A.D. 821. (which was united in 828) by Egbert, King of the West-Saxons, and first monarch of all England.
- 1767, Bickerstaff's Boston almanack, for the year of our Lord 1768 ... : Calculated for the meridian of Boston; but will answer without a sensible error for any part of New-England. : Illustrated with an elegant plate of the giants lately discovered in South America ...
- 1769, A state of the importations from Great-Britain into the port of Boston, from the beginning of Jan. 1769, to Aug. 17th 1769. : With the advertisements of a set of men who assumed to themselves the title of "All the well disposed merchants," who entered into a solemn agreement, (as they called it) not to import goods from Britain, and who undertook to give a "true account" of what should be imported by other persons. : The whole taken from the Boston chronicle, in which the following papers were first published.
- 1770, A state of importations from Great-Britain into the port of Boston. From the beginning of January 1770. To which is added an account of all goods that have been re-shipt from the above port for Great-Britain since January 1769.
- 1775, Sagittarius's letters and political speculations extracted from the Public ledger. Humbly inscribed to the very loyal and truly pious Doctor Samuel Cooper, pastor of the Congregational church in Brattle street.

== See also ==
- Early American publishers and printers
- Bibliography of early American publishers and printers
