= Nathaniel Coffin (politician) =

Canadian politician

Nathaniel Coffin (February 20, 1766 – August 12, 1846) was a surveyor and political figure in Lower Canada and a militia officer in Upper Canada.

He was born in Boston, Massachusetts, in 1766, the son of John Coffin, and left there with his family in 1775 at the start of the American Revolution. He joined the British Army in 1783. Coffin later returned to Quebec where he was appointed a surveyor in 1790.

In 1796, he was elected to the Legislative Assembly of Lower Canada for Bedford County. Coffin was named a justice of the peace for Montreal district later that year. He served with the militia during the War of 1812. Coffin was named deputy adjutant general of the Upper Canadian militia in 1814 and adjutant general in 1815. He was replaced by James FitzGibbon as adjutant general at the start of the Upper Canada Rebellion.

His brother Thomas also served in the legislative assembly.

Coffin was friends with the Edinburgh-born New England bookseller and publisher John Mein.

He died in Toronto in 1846.
