= James Lloyd =

James Lloyd may refer to:

== Politicians ==
- James Lloyd (Maryland politician) (1745–1830), American senator from Maryland
- James Lloyd (Massachusetts politician) (1769–1831), American senator from Massachusetts
- James T. Lloyd (1857–1944), American congressman from Missouri
- James M. Lloyd (1886–1969), American politician from South Dakota
- James F. Lloyd (1922–2012), American congressman from California
- James Monteith Lloyd, administrator of Grenada (1957–1962), see list of colonial governors of Grenada
- James R. Lloyd (1950–1989), American politician in Pennsylvania
- Sir James Lloyd, 1st Baronet (1762–1844), Sussex landowner, militia officer and Member of Parliament
- Jim Lloyd (born 1954), Australian politician from New South Wales

== Others ==
- James Lloyd (convict) (1825–1898), convict transported to Western Australia
- James Lloyd (obstetrician) (1728–1810), American surgeon and obstetrician
- James Lloyd (artist) (1905–1974), English landscape painter
- James Lloyd (footballer) (1861–?), Welsh footballer
- James Lloyd, convicted British serial rapist known as the Rotherham shoe rapist
- Jimmy Lloyd (boxer) (1939–2013), British boxer
- Jimmy Lloyd (actor) (1918–1988), American actor
- Jimmy Lloyd, recording pseudonym of Jimmie Logsdon (1922–2001), American singer
- James Lloyd (portrait artist) (born 1971), British portrait artist
- Lil' Cease (James Lloyd, Jr., born 1977), American rapper
- Jamie Lloyd (director) (born 1980), British theater producer
- Jimmy Lloyd (wrestler) (born 1998), American professional wrestler
- James Lloyd, member of the jazz fusion group Pieces of a Dream

== See also ==
- Lloyd James (disambiguation)
- Jamie Lloyd (disambiguation)
