= Otis House =

Otis House may refer to:

- Otis House (Prescott, Arizona), listed on the NRHP in Yavapai County, Arizona
- First Harrison Gray Otis House, Boston, MA, listed on the NRHP in Massachusetts
- Second Harrison Gray Otis House, Boston, MA, listed on the NRHP in Massachusetts
- Third Harrison Gray Otis House, Boston, MA
- Otis-Wyman House, Somerville, MA, listed on the NRHP in Massachusetts
