= University Hall (Harvard University) =

- University Hall, Harvard University
- U.S. National Register of Historic Places
- U.S. National Historic Landmark
- U.S. Historic district – Contributing property
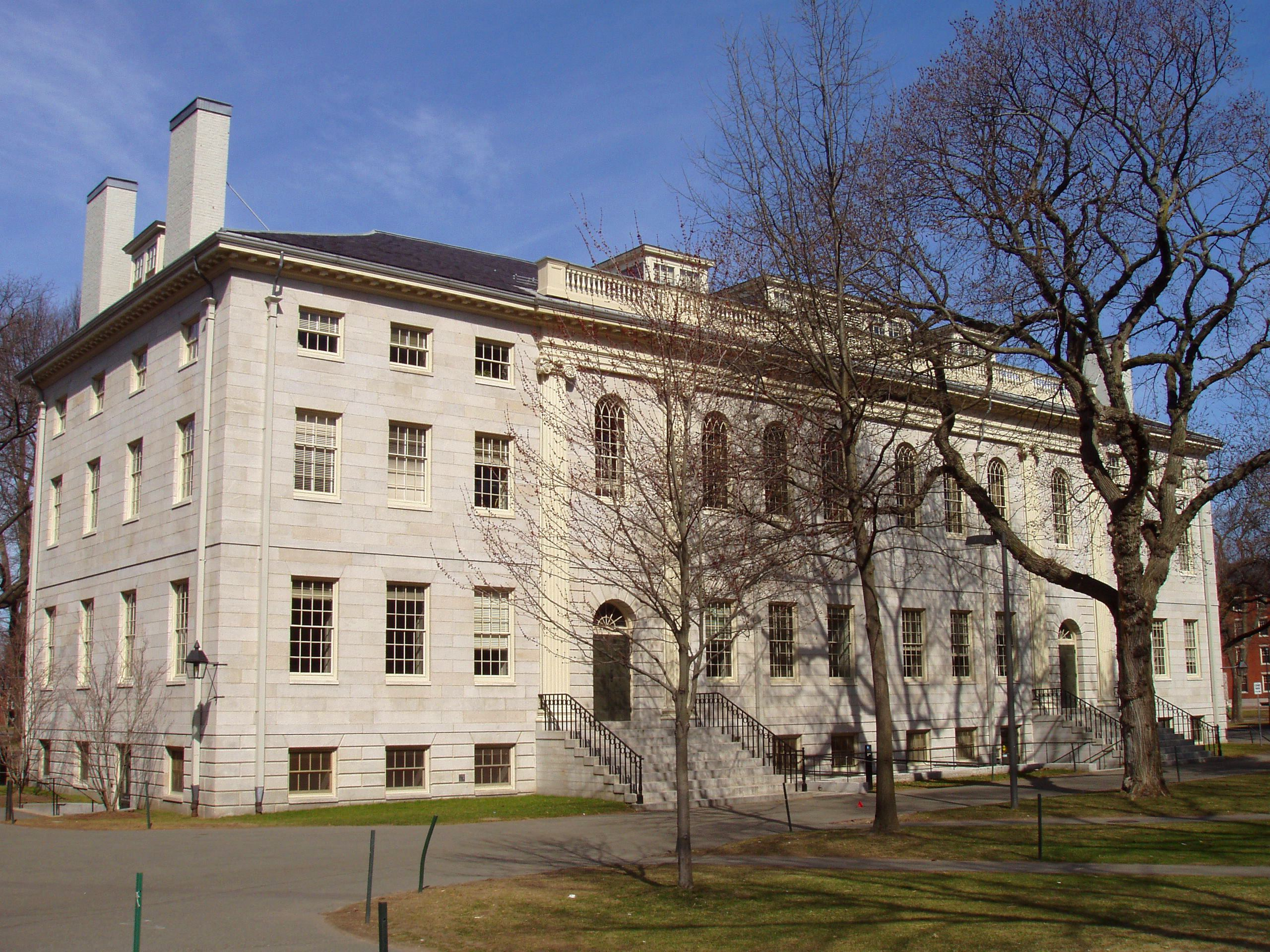
- University Hall, east facade.

- Location within Massachusetts Location within the United States
- Location: Cambridge, Massachusetts
- Coordinates: 42°22′28.0″N 71°7′1.4″W
- Built: 1813–1815
- Architect: Charles Bulfinch
- Architectural style: Colonial Revival, Federal
- Part of: Old Harvard Yard (ID73000287)
- NRHP reference No.: 70000736

Significant dates
- Added to NRHP: December 30, 1970
- Designated NHL: December 30, 1970
- Designated CP: February 6, 1973

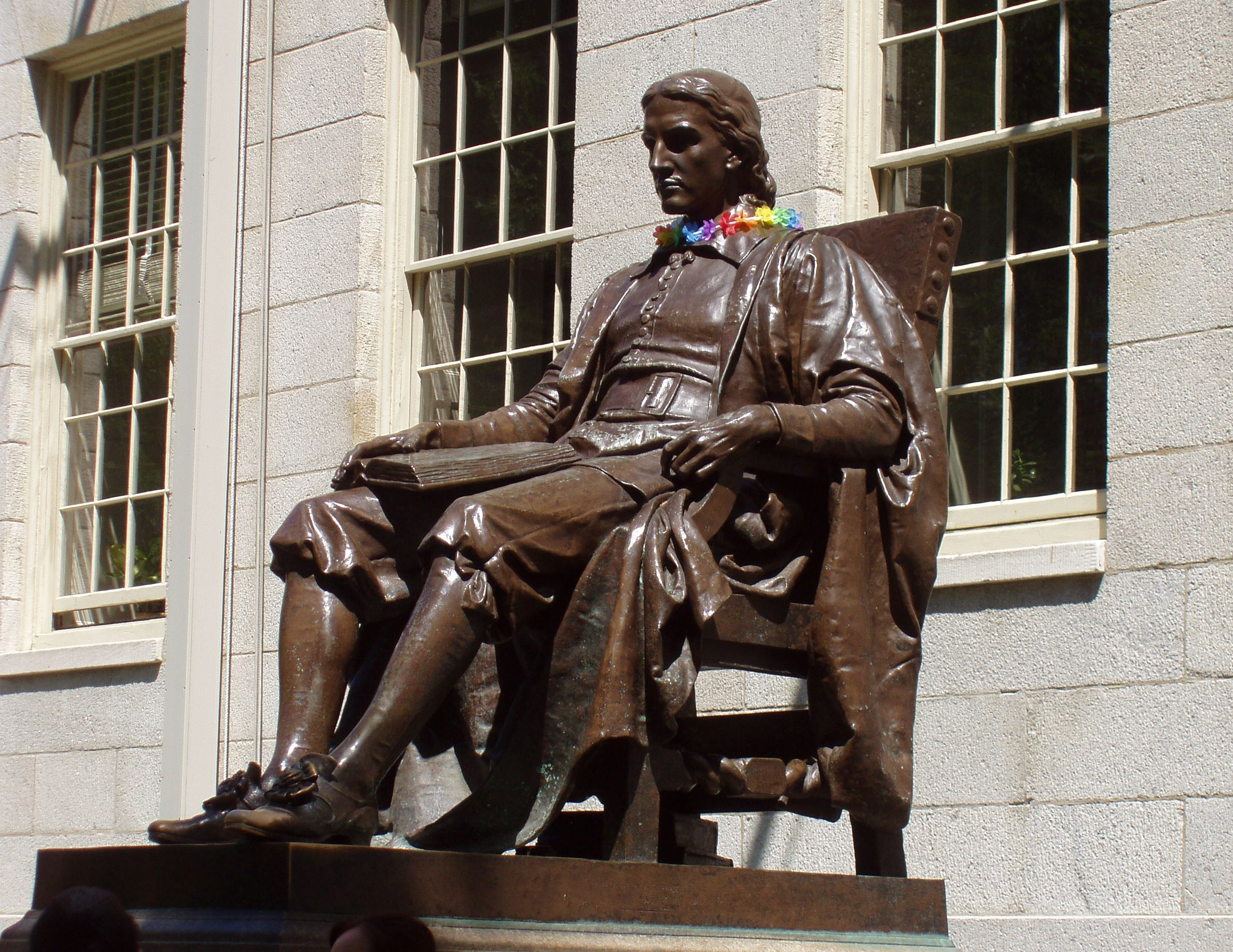
John Harvard statue before west facade.

University Hall is a white granite building designed by the great early American architect Charles Bulfinch and built by the noted early engineer Loammi Baldwin Jr. It is located in Harvard Yard on the campus of Harvard University in Cambridge, Massachusetts. It was designated a National Historic Landmark in 1970 for its architectural significance.

The hall was designed by Bulfinch, class of 1781, and built between 1813 and 1815 of white Chelmsford granite, probably using rock cut to size at the Charlestown Prison. It consists of a partial basement story, plus three full stories raised above ground as well as an additional story set within the roofline. The long east and west facades are very similar, and symmetrically arranged with two entrances per facade, each flanked by pilasters; smaller north and south facades present rows of windows. Total construction cost was $65,000 of which $53,000 was paid by the Commonwealth of Massachusetts.

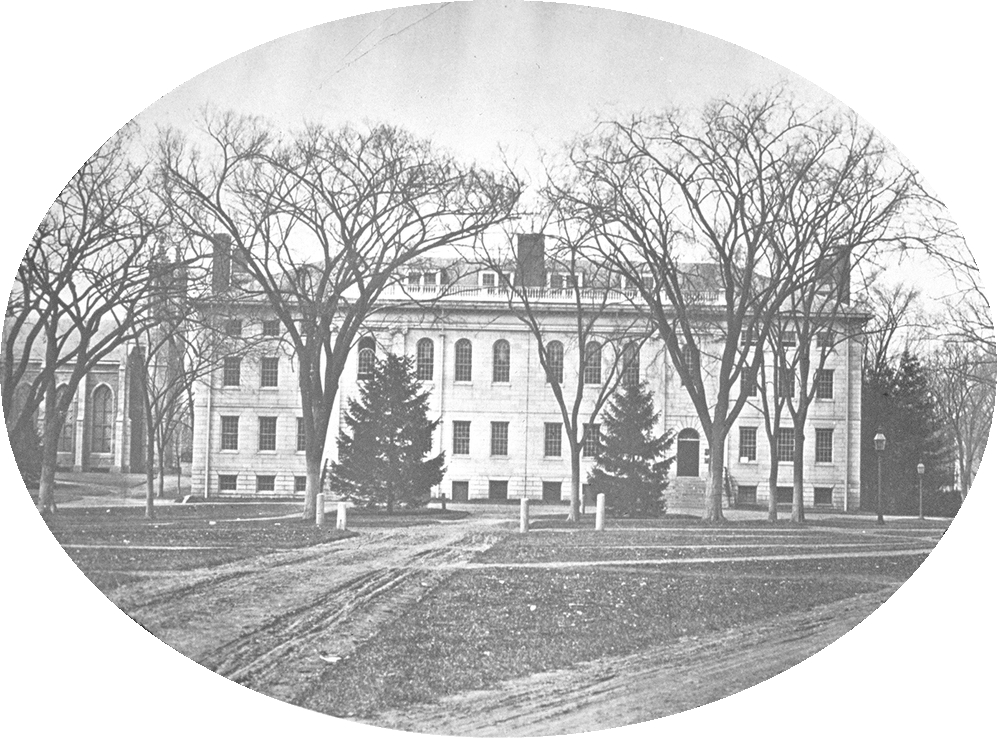
University Hall, west facade in 1869.

University Hall's first floor contained the College Commons (dining room) until 1849. The building also contained a library and philosophical (scientific) apparatus, as well as a chapel within the second and third floors. A massive portico with stone pillars was added to the western facade soon after completion, but removed in 1842. In 1849 the first floor was partitioned into classrooms; in 1867 the chapel was partitioned as well. In 1896 the chapel was restored and used for meetings of the Faculty of Arts and Sciences. In 1924 Daniel Chester French's bronze statue of John Harvard was moved to the western façade from its original location near Memorial Hall.

== 1969 Occupation ==
In protest of the Vietnam War and Harvard's connections to it, students occupied University Hall on the night of April 8 to 9, 1969, forcing out Harvard officials and staff. In the early morning hours of April 10 the occupiers were ejected and some 100 to 300 persons arrested; about 50 were injured. Students camped on the lawn outside University Hall for brief periods in 2020 and 2024, related to fossil fuel divestment and the Gaza war, respectively.

== See also ==
- List of National Historic Landmarks in Massachusetts
- National Register of Historic Places listings in Cambridge, Massachusetts
