= Charles Bulfinch =

American architect (1763–1844)

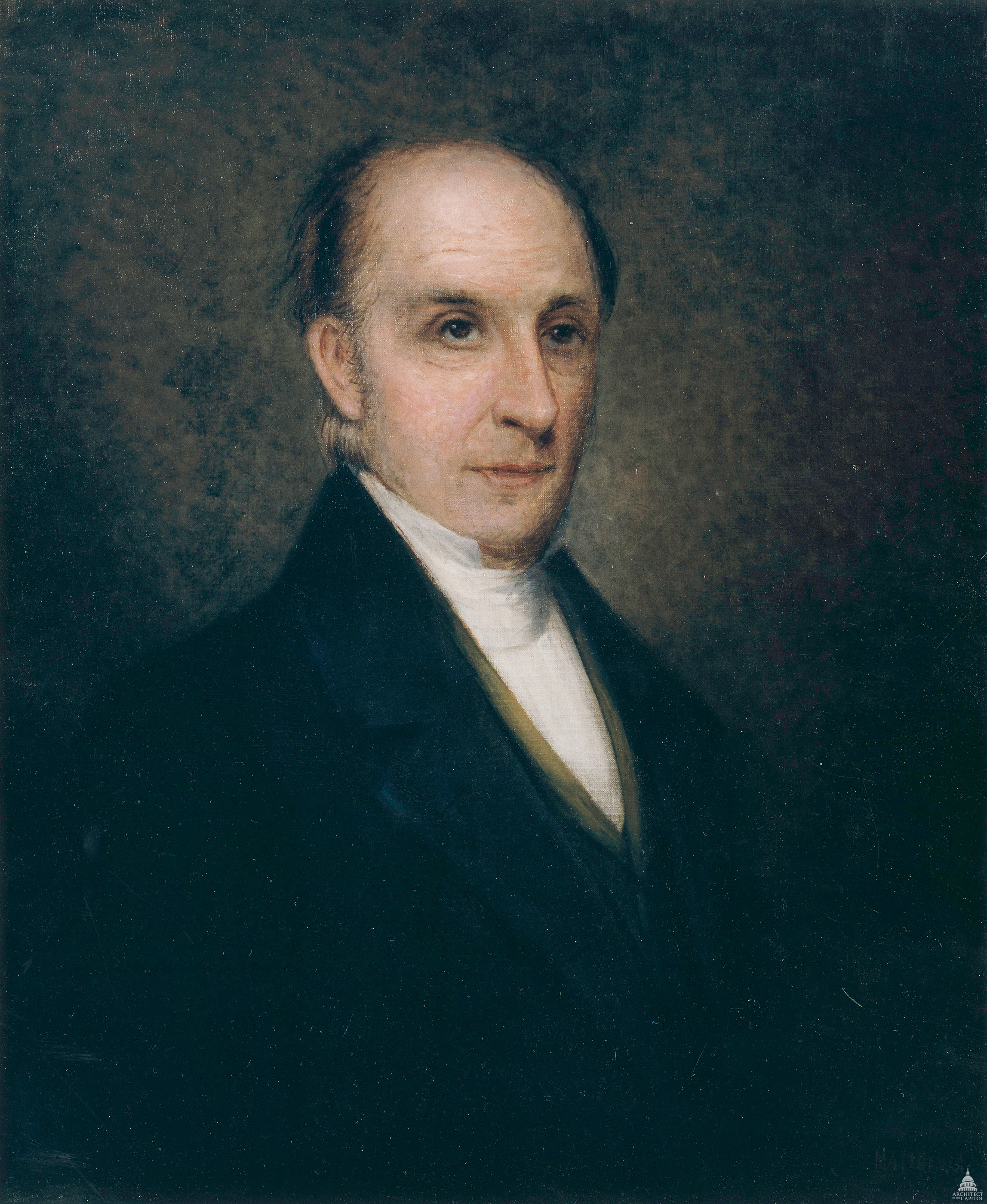

Architect of the Capitol
- In office January 6, 1818 – June 25, 1829
- President: James Monroe; John Quincy Adams; Andrew Jackson
- Preceded by: Benjamin Henry Latrobe
- Succeeded by: Thomas U. Walter

Personal details
- Born: August 8, 1763 Boston, Massachusetts Bay Colony
- Died: April 15, 1844 (aged 80) Boston, Massachusetts, U.S.
- Parents: Thomas Bulfinch (father); Susan Apthorp (mother)
- Profession: Civil Engineer

Charles Bulfinch (August 8, 1763 – April 15, 1844) was an early American architect, and has been regarded by many as the first American-born professional architect to practice.

Bulfinch split his career between his native Boston, Massachusetts, and Washington, D.C., where he served as Commissioner of Public Building and built the intermediate United States Capitol rotunda and dome. His works are notable for their simplicity and Federal style of classical domes, columns, and ornament that dominated early 19th-century American architecture.

== Early life ==
Bulfinch was born in Boston to Thomas Bulfinch, a prominent physician, and his wife, Susan Apthorp, daughter of Charles Apthorp. At the age of 12, he watched the Battle of Bunker Hill from this home on the Boston side of the Charles River. Charles himself was married to Hannah Apthorp on 20 November 1788 in Boston.

He was educated at Boston Latin School and Harvard University, from which he graduated with an AB in 1781 and master's degree in 1784.

He then made a grand tour of Europe from 1785 to 1788, traveling to London, Paris, and the major cities of Italy. Bulfinch was greatly influenced by Renaissance architect Andrea Palladio. He was also influenced by the classical architecture in Italy and the neoclassical buildings of Sir Christopher Wren, Robert Adam, William Chambers, and others in the United Kingdom. Thomas Jefferson became something of a mentor to him in Europe, as he would later be to Robert Mills.

Upon his return to the United States in 1787, he became a promoter of the ship Columbia Rediviva's voyage around the world under command of Captain Robert Gray (1755–1806). It was the first American ship to circumnavigate the globe. In 1788, he married Hannah Apthorp, his first cousin. Their sons include Thomas Bulfinch (1796–1867), author of Bulfinch's Mythology, and Stephen Greenleaf Bulfinch (1809–1870), Unitarian clergyman and author.

== Career ==
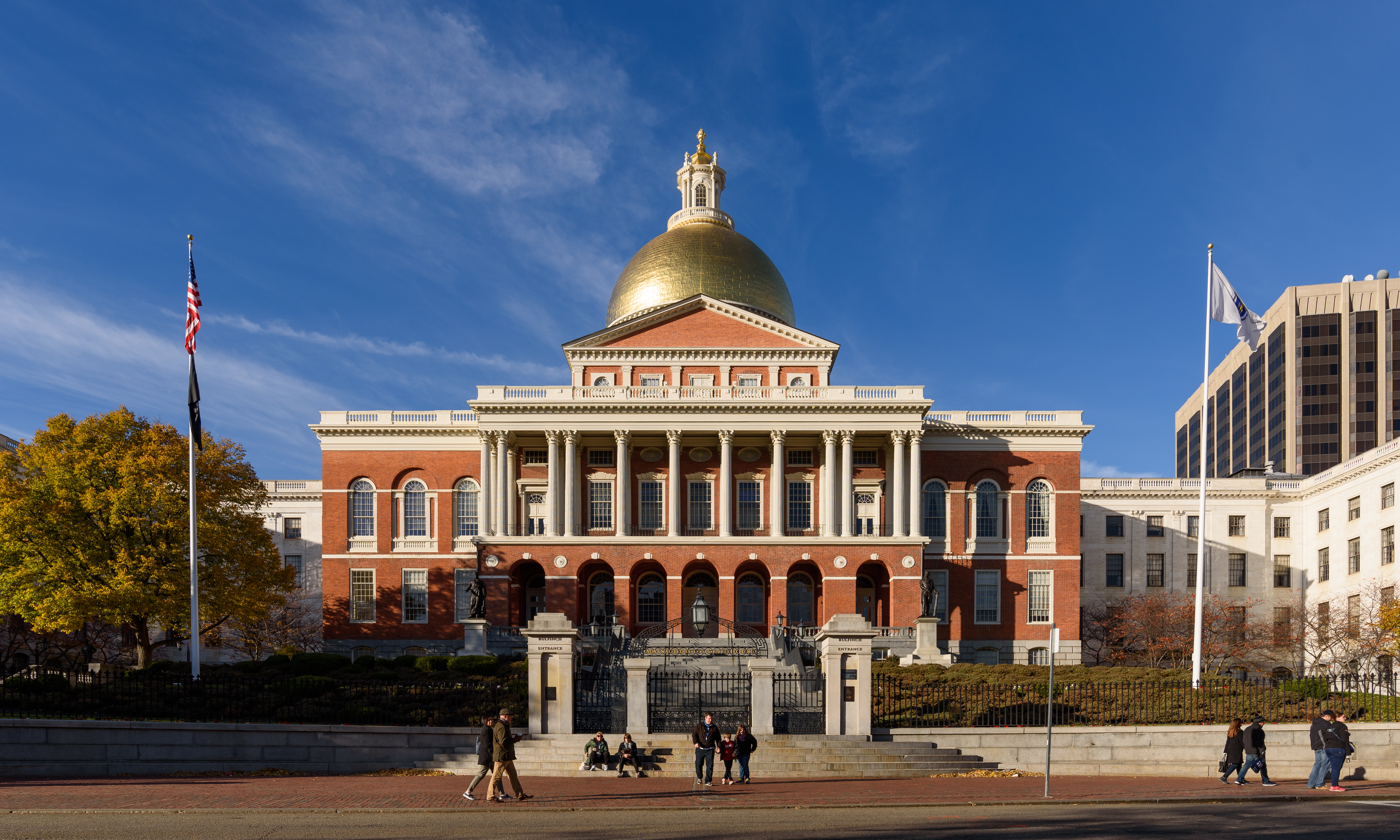
Massachusetts State House, completed 1798

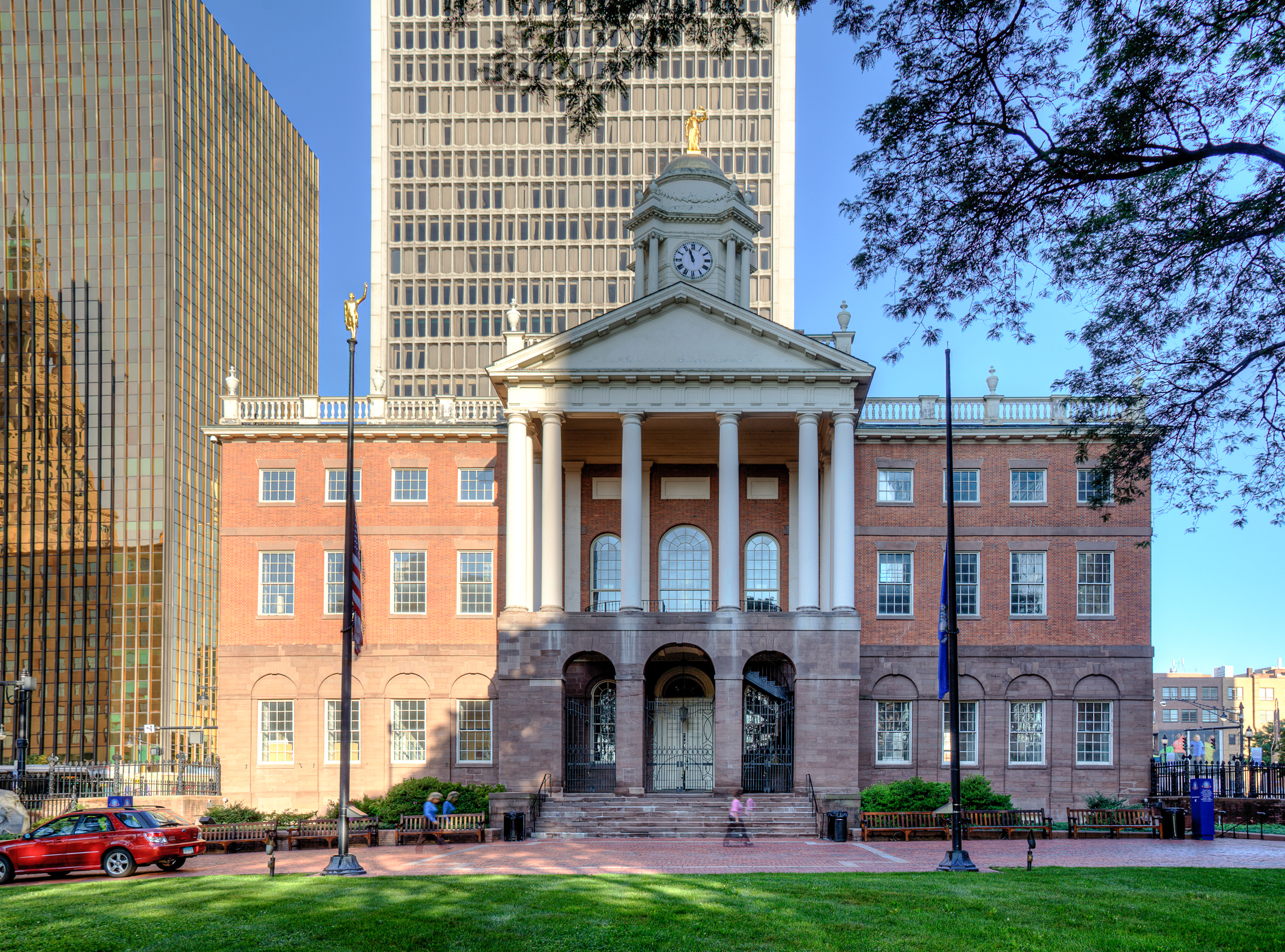
Old Connecticut State House, built in 1796

Bulfinch's first building was the Hollis Street Church (1788). Among his other early works are a memorial column on Beacon Hill (1789), the first monument to the American Revolution; the Federal Street theater (1793); the "Tontine Crescent" (built 1793–1794, now demolished), fashioned in part after John Wood's Royal Crescent; the Old State House in Hartford, Connecticut (1796); and the Massachusetts State House (1798). He was elected a Fellow of the American Academy of Arts and Sciences in 1791.

Over the course of ten years, Bulfinch built a remarkable number of private dwellings in the Boston area, including Joseph Barrell's Pleasant Hill (1793), a series of three houses in Boston for Harrison Gray Otis (1796, 1800, 1806), and the John Phillips House (1804). He built several churches in Boston, of which New North (built 1802–1804) is the last standing.

Serving from 1791 to 1795 on Boston's board of selectmen, he resigned due to business pressures but returned in 1799. From 1799 to 1817, he was the chairman of Boston's board of selectmen continuously, and served as a paid police superintendent, improving the city's streets, drains, and lighting. Under his direction, both the infrastructure and civic center of Boston were transformed into a dignified, classical style. Bulfinch was responsible for the design of the Boston Common, the remodeling and enlargement of Faneuil Hall (1805), and the construction of India Wharf. In these Boston years, he also designed the Massachusetts State Prison (1803); Boylston Market (1810); University Hall for Harvard University (1813–1814); First Church of Christ, Unitarian in Lancaster, Massachusetts (1815–1817); and the Bulfinch Building, home of the Ether Dome at Massachusetts General Hospital (1818), its completion overseen by Alexander Parris, who was working in Bulfinch's office at the time the architect was summoned to Washington.

Despite this great activity and civic involvement, Bulfinch was insolvent several times starting in 1796, including at the start of his work on the statehouse, and was jailed for the month of July 1811 for debt (in a prison he had designed himself). There was no payment for his services as selectman, and he received only $1,400 for designing and overseeing the construction of the State House.

In the summer of 1817, Bulfinch's roles as selectman, designer, and public official coincided during a visit by President James Monroe. The two men were almost constantly in each other's company for the week-long visit, and a few months later (1818), Monroe appointed Bulfinch the successor to Benjamin Henry Latrobe (1764–1820) as Architect of the Capitol in Washington, DC (the Capitol Building had been partially burned by the British in 1814.) In this position, he was paid a salary of $2,500 per year plus expenses.

He was also a founding member of The Massachusetts Society for Promoting Agriculture (M.S.P.A.), one of the earliest agricultural societies in the United States. The Society was incorporated by an act of the Commonwealth of Massachusetts on March 7, 1792.

As Commissioner of Public Building, Bulfinch completed the Capitol's wings and central portion, designed the western approach and portico, and constructed the Capitol's original low wooden dome to his own design (replaced by the present cast-iron dome completed in the mid-1860s). In 1829 Bulfinch completed the construction of the Capitol, 36 years after its cornerstone was laid. During his interval in Washington, Bulfinch also drew plans for the State House in Augusta, Maine (1829–1832), a Unitarian Church and prison in Washington, D.C.. In 1827, he was elected into the National Academy of Design as an Honorary member. He returned to Boston in 1830, where he died on April 15, 1844, aged 80, and was buried in the King's Chapel crypt in Boston. His tomb was later moved to Mount Auburn Cemetery in Cambridge, Massachusetts. In 1943, a United States Liberty ship named the SS Charles Bulfinch was launched. The ship was scrapped in 1971.

== Designs ==
Designs marked with an asterisk (*) have been attributed to Bulfinch, though are not confirmed to have been designed by the architect

- Second meeting house of the Hollis Street Church (1788), Boston, Massachusetts
- Meeting House (1789–1792), Taunton, Massachusetts
- Bulfinch Church (1790–1793), Pittsfield, Massachusetts
- Beacon Hill Memorial (1791), Boston, Massachusetts
- Joseph Coolidge House (1792), Boston, Massachusetts
- Federal Street Theatre (1793), Boston, Massachusetts
- Tontine Crescent (1793–95), Boston, Massachusetts
- First Harrison Gray Otis House (1795–96), Boston, Massachusetts
- Massachusetts State House (1795–1798), Boston, Massachusetts
- Old Connecticut State House (1796), Hartford, Connecticut
- Dedham Community House (1798), Dedham, Massachusetts
- Second Harrison Gray Otis House (1800–1802), Boston, Massachusetts
- Holy Cross Church (1800-1803), Boston, Massachusetts
- Worcester County Courthouse (1801-1803) Worcester, Massachusetts
- St. Stephen's Church (1802-1804), Boston, Massachusetts
- Amory–Ticknor House (1804), Boston, Massachusetts
- Nichols House (1804), Boston, Massachusetts
- 51–57 Mount Vernon Street (1804), Boston, Massachusetts
- Samuel Gridley and Julia Ward Howe House* (1804-1805), Boston, Massachusetts
- 13-17 Chestnut Street (1804-1805), Boston, Massachusetts
- Newburyport Superior Courthouse (1805), Newburyport, Massachusetts
- Stoughton Hall, Harvard University (1805), Cambridge, Massachusetts
- Third Harrison Gray Otis House (1806), Boston, Massachusetts
- Faneuil Hall expansion (1806), Boston, Massachusetts
- Quarters A, Brooklyn Navy Yard* (1805-1806), Brooklyn, New York
- Second steeple of Old North Church* (1806), Boston, Massachusetts
- India Wharf (1807), Boston, Massachusetts
- 87 Mount Vernon Street (1807), Boston, Massachusetts
- Third meeting house of the Federal Street Church (1809), Boston, Massachusetts
- Massachusetts Bank (1809) Boston, Massachusetts
- Boylston Market (1810), Boston, Massachusetts
- Suffolk County Courthouse (1810), Boston, Massachusetts
- Essex Bank (1811), Salem, Massachusetts
- University Hall, Harvard University (1813–1815), Cambridge, Massachusetts
- New South Church (1814), Boston, Massachusetts
- Manufacturers & Mechanics Bank (1814-1815), Boston, Massachusetts
- Middlesex County Courthouse (1814-1816), Cambridge, Massachusetts
- First Church of Christ, Unitarian (1816), Lancaster, Massachusetts
- Salem Town Hall (1816–17), Salem, Massachusetts
- Chapel and library, Andover Theological Seminary (1817-1818), Andover, Massachusetts
- Massachusetts General Hospital, Bulfinch Building (1818-1823), Boston, Massachusetts
- United States Capitol alterations (1822-1823), Washington, D.C.
- First Unitarian Church (1821-1822), Washington, D.C
- The George Washington University, Columbian College (1821-1822), original building, Washington, D.C.
- U.S. Capitol Gatehouses and Gateposts (1827), Washington, D.C.
- Maine State House (1832), Augusta, Maine

== Gallery of designs ==
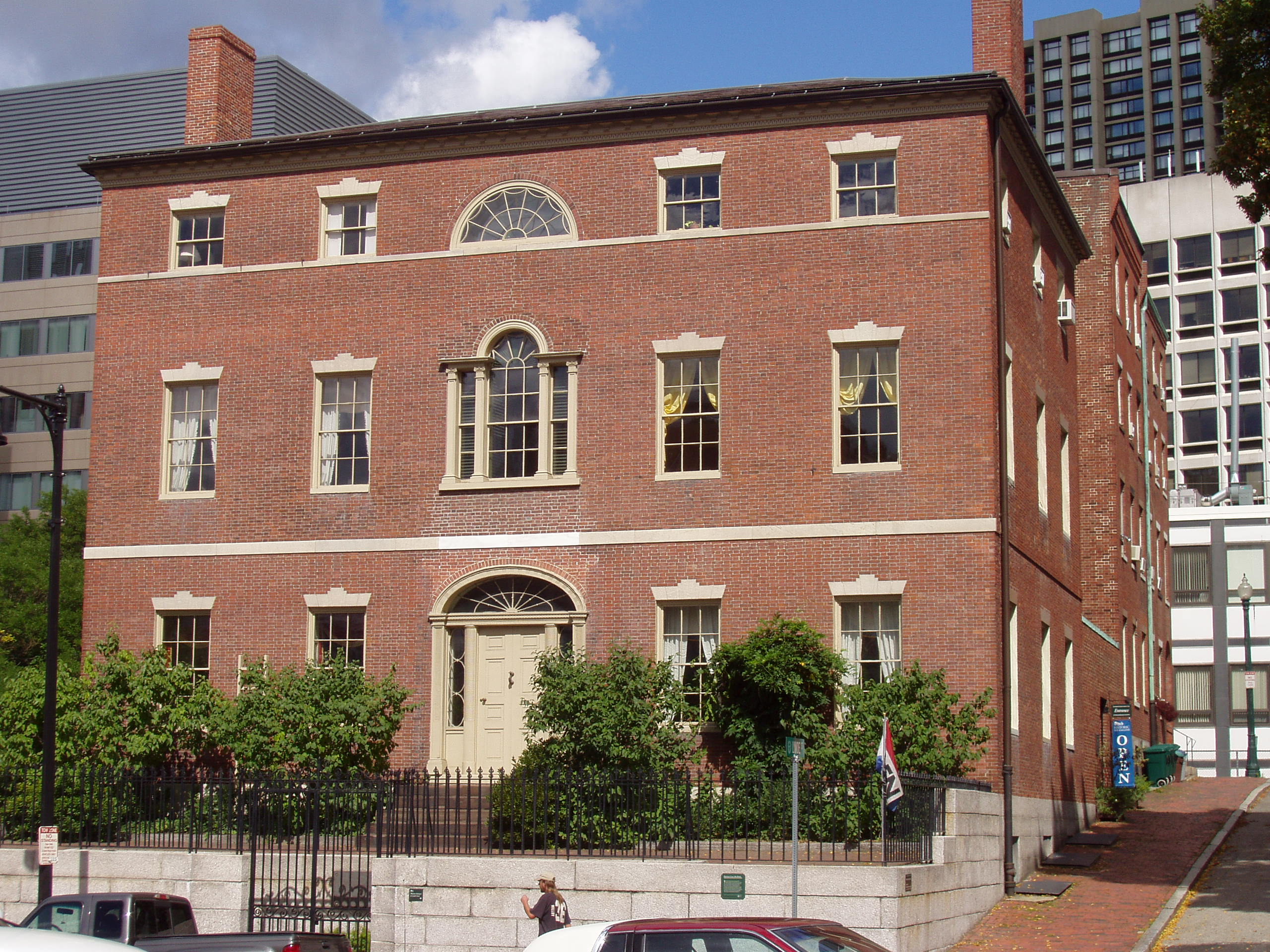
1st Harrison Gray Otis House, 141 Cambridge Street

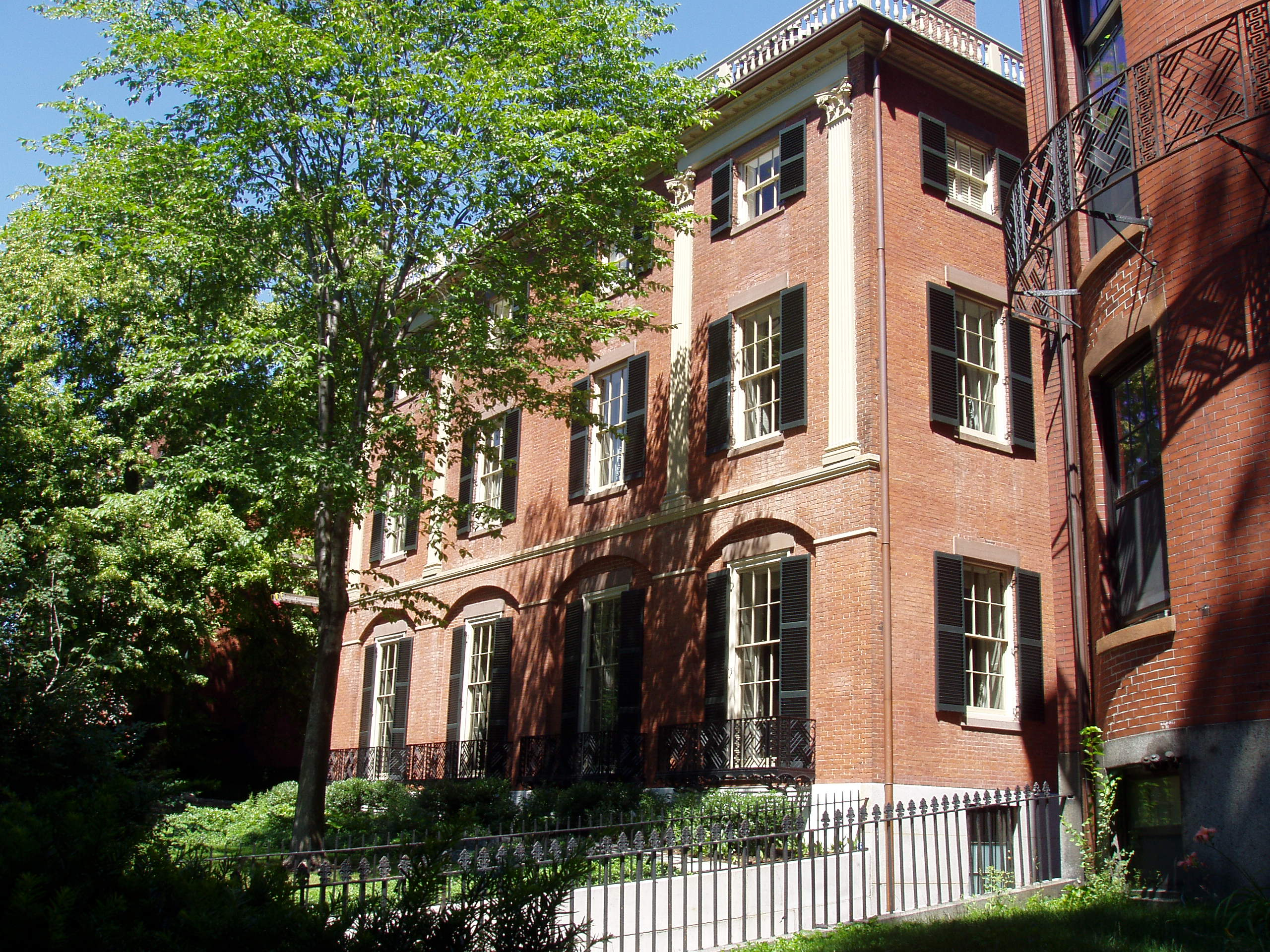
2nd Harrison Gray Otis House, 85 Mount Vernon Street

Tontine Crescent, Boston

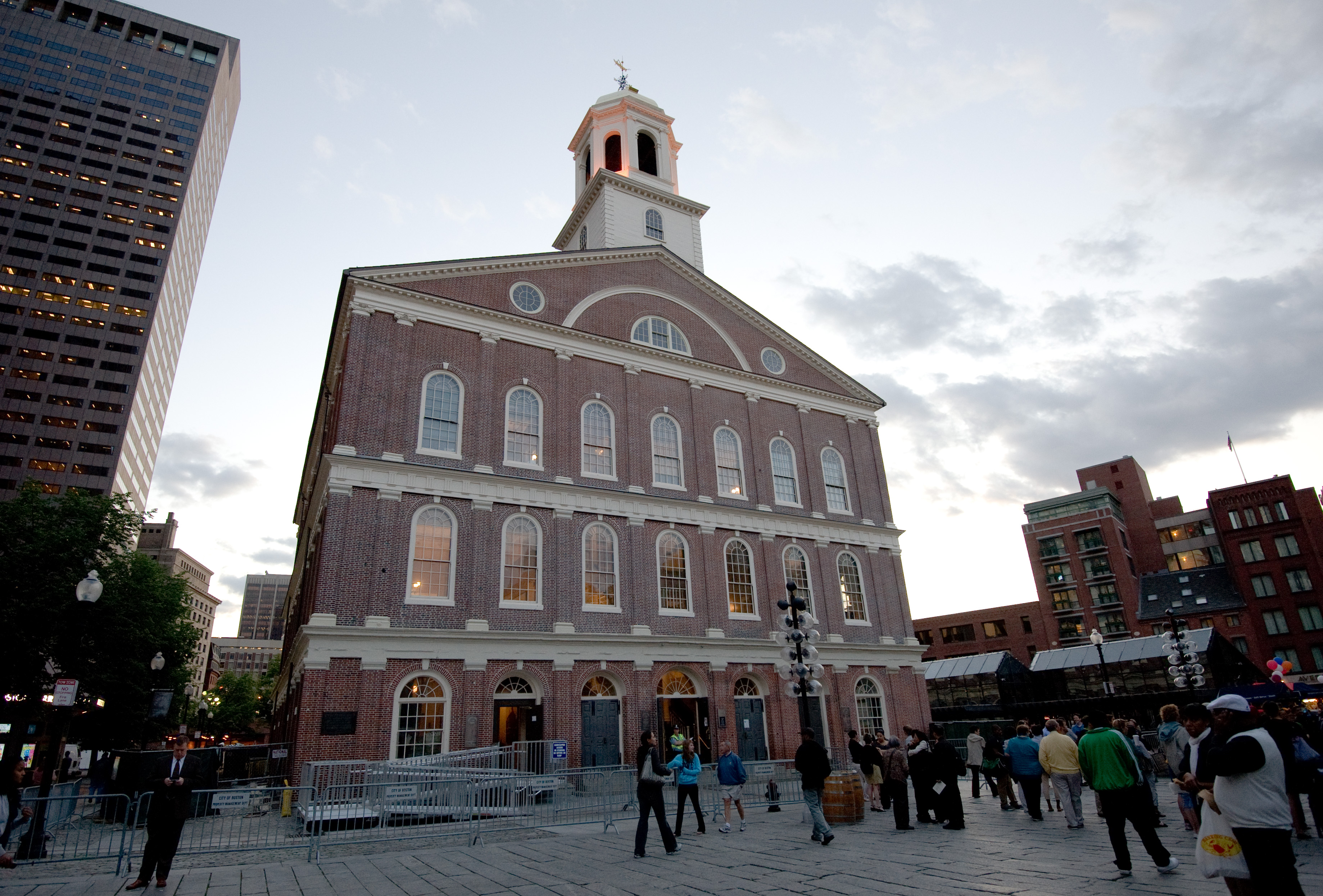
Faneuil Hall expansion.

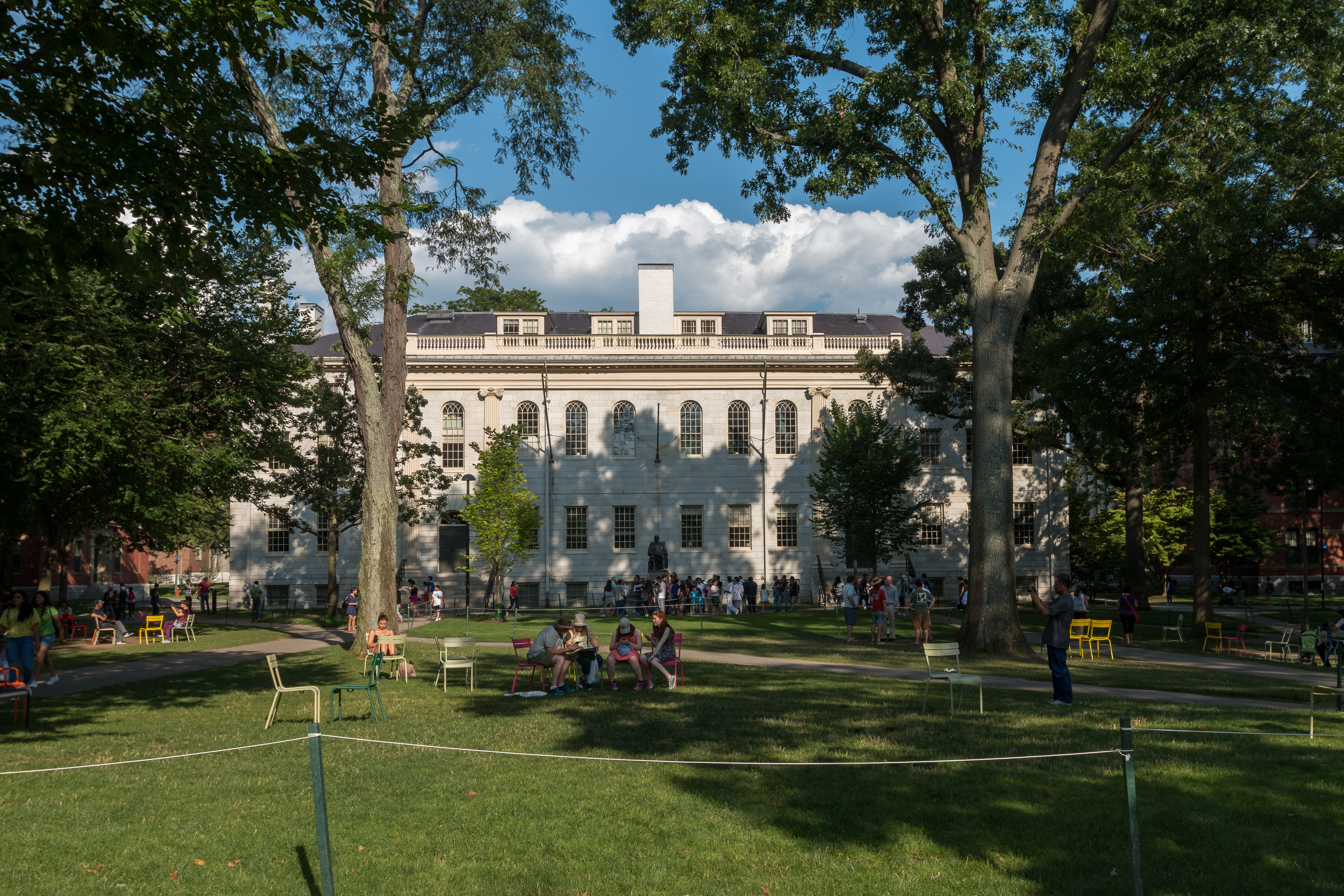
University Hall (Harvard University)

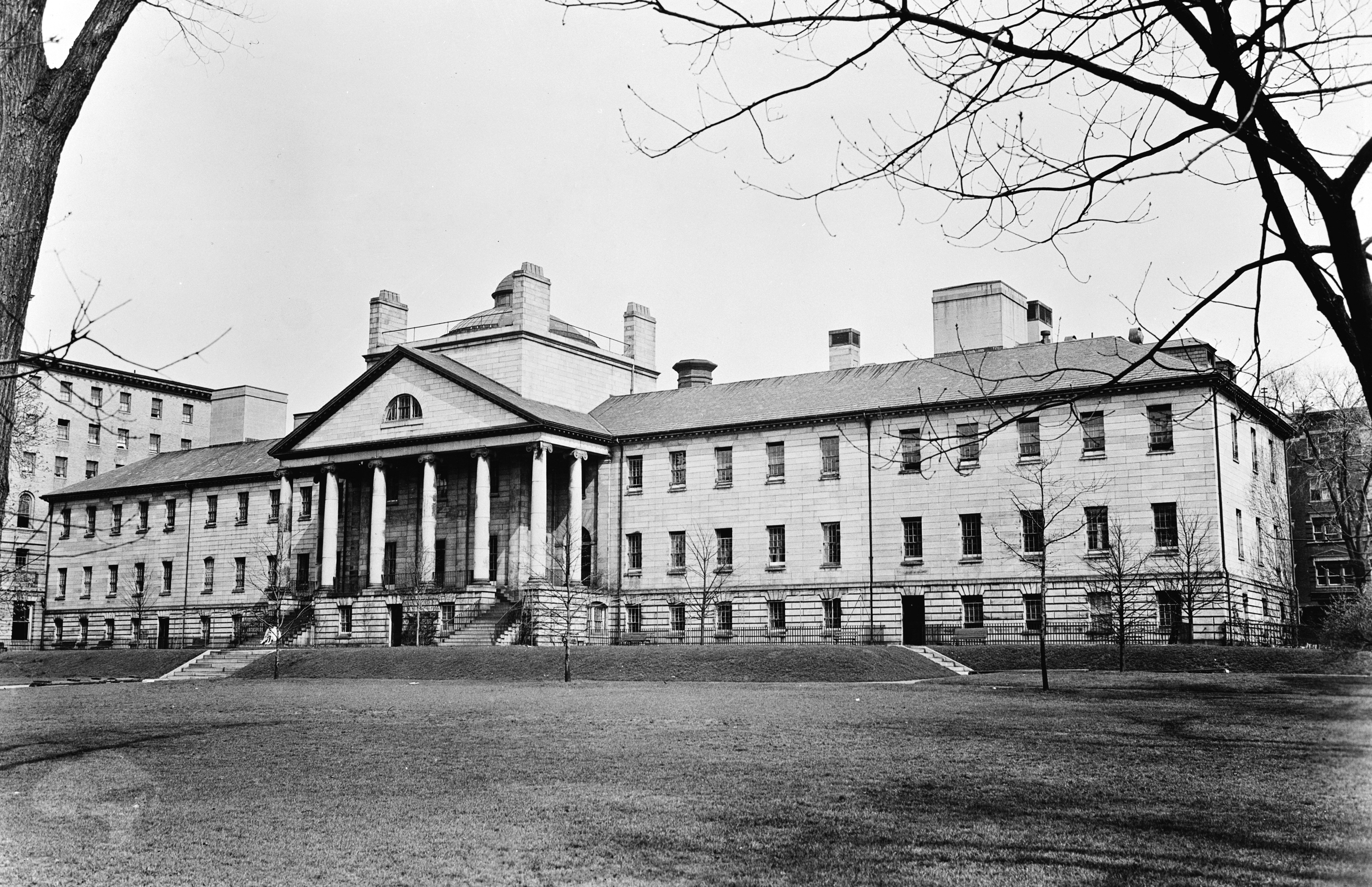
Massachusetts General Hospital, Bulfinch Building

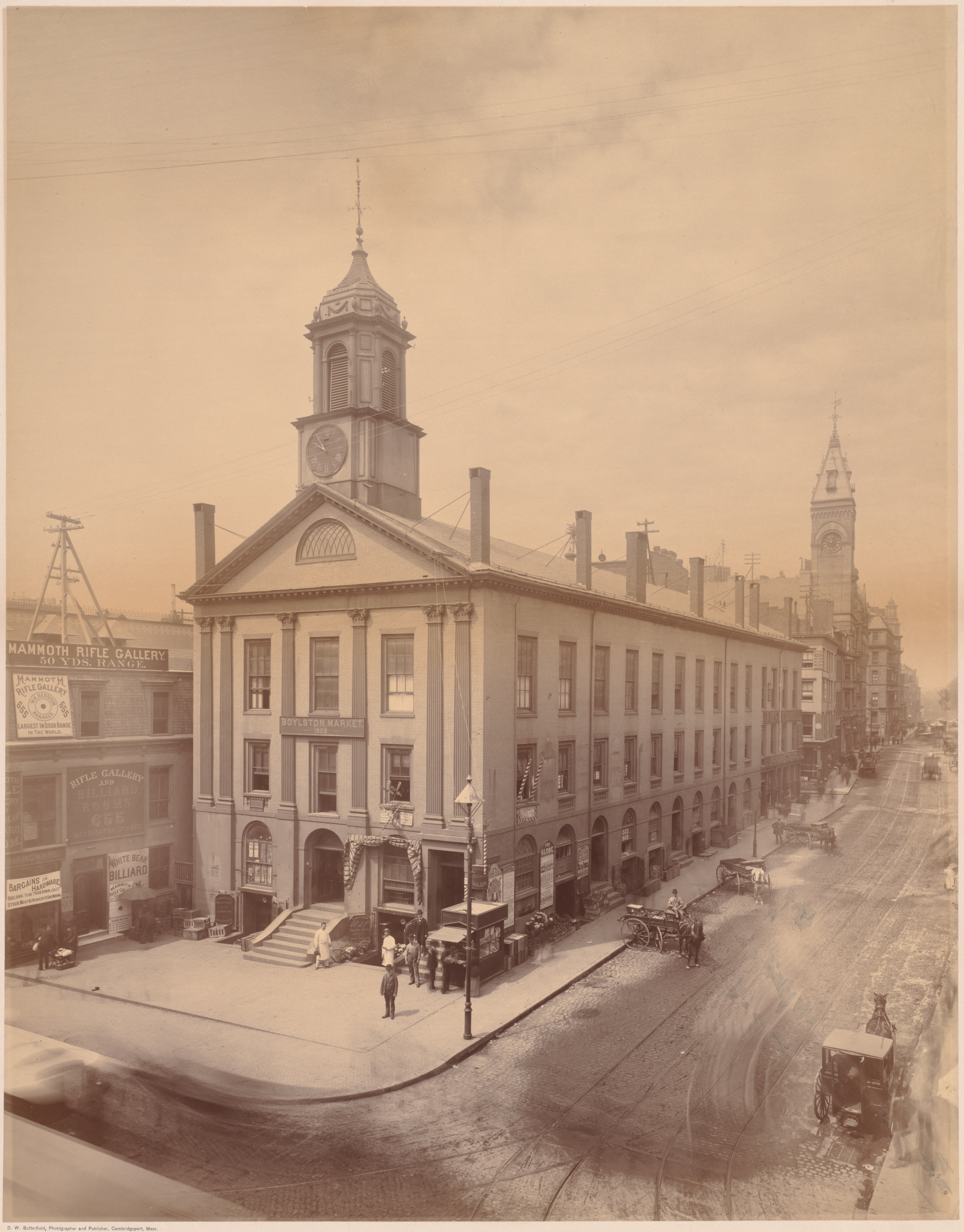
Boylston Market, Boston, Massachusetts

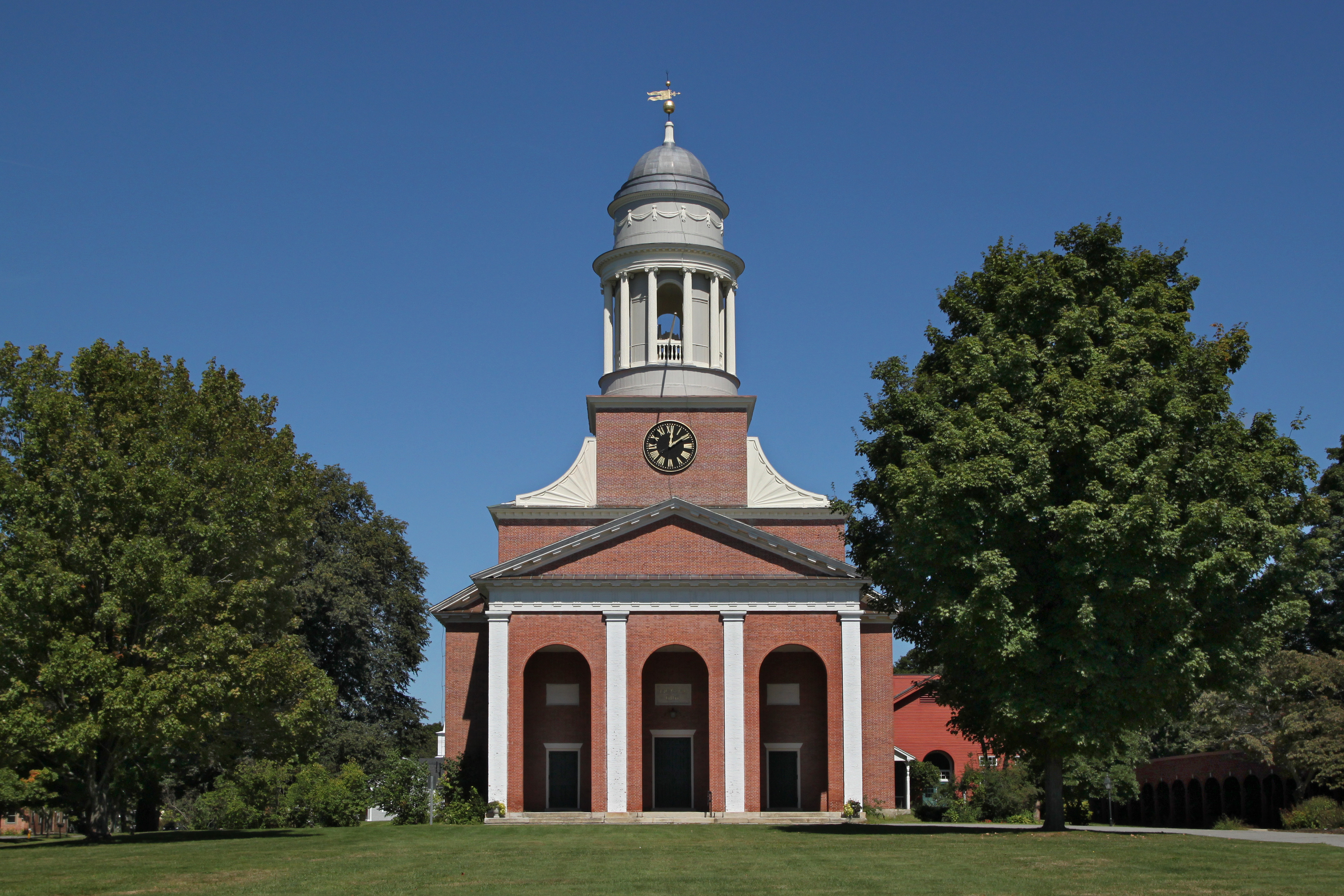
First Church of Christ, Unitarian, Lancaster, Massachusetts

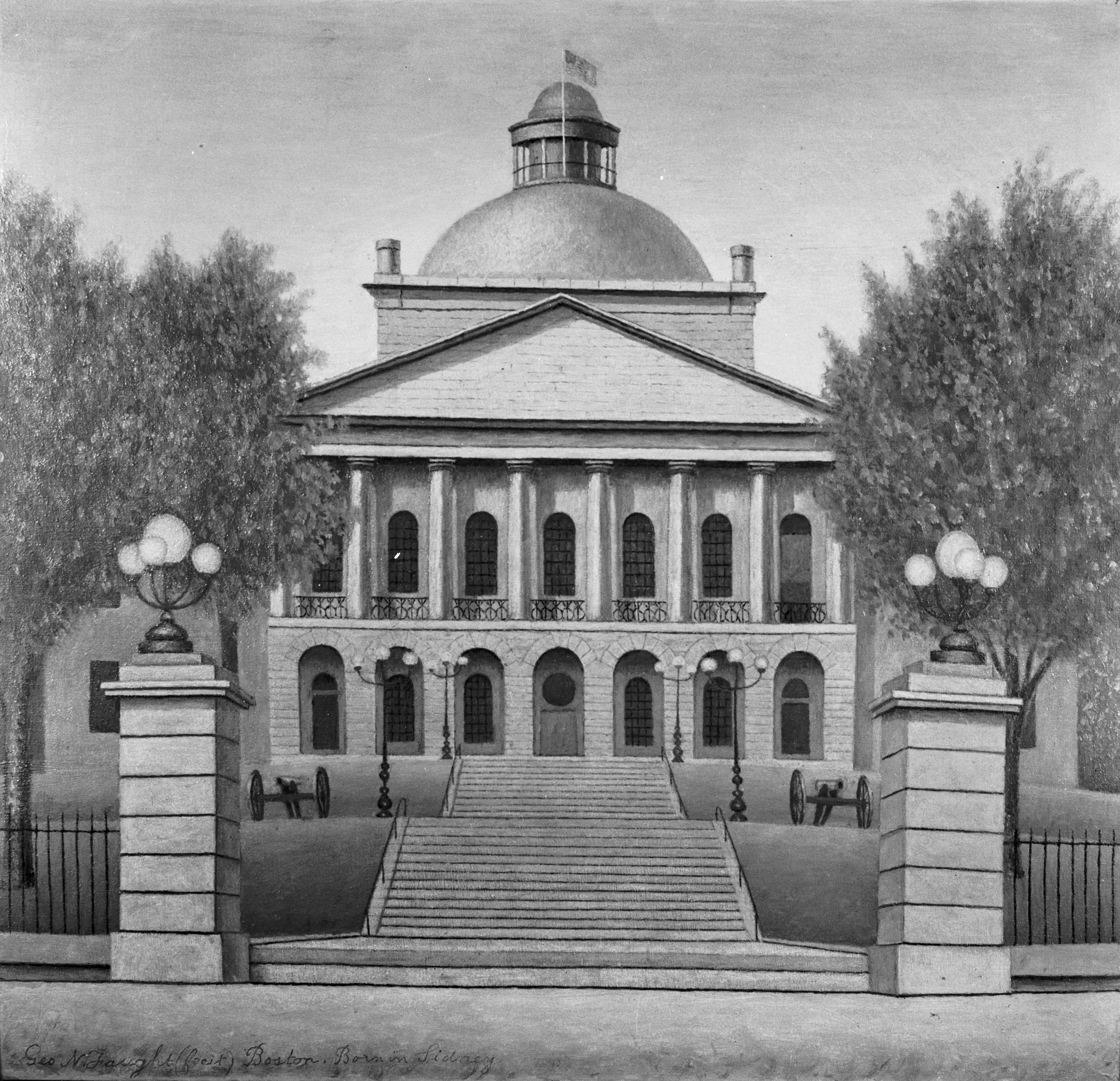
Maine State House, Augusta, Maine

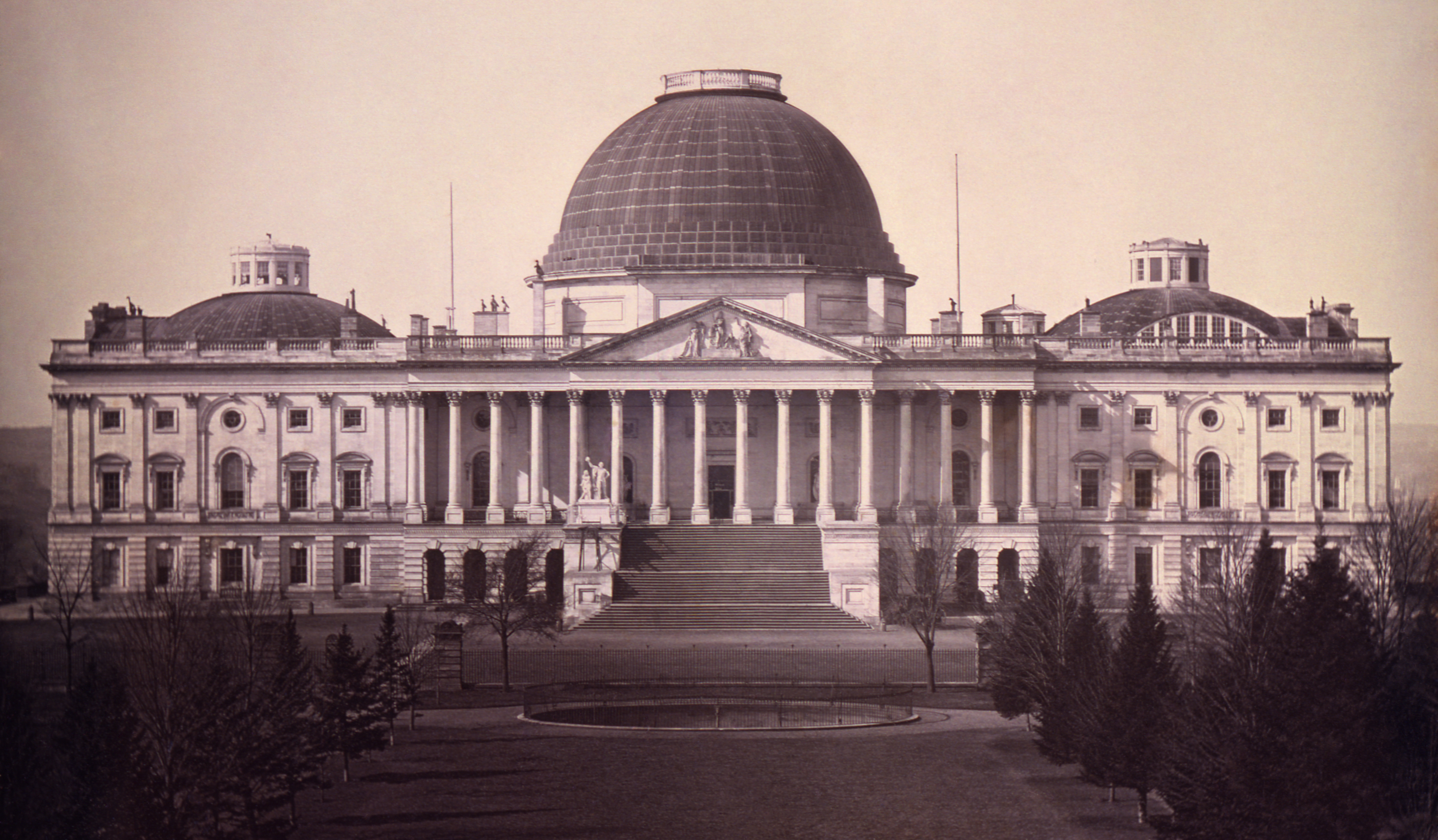
United States Capitol, 1846

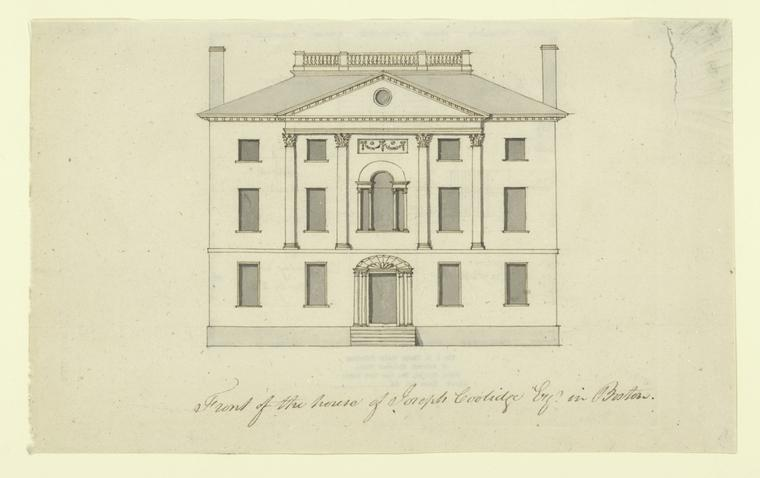
Joseph Coolidge House, Boston, 1792

== See also ==
- New Hampshire historical marker no. 33: The Ridge

Political offices
Preceded by Stephen Hallet	Architect of the Capitol; 1818–1829	Succeeded by Thomas U. Walter
