= Lloyd James =

Lloyd James may refer to:

- Lloyd James (cricketer) (1937–2019), Bermudian cricketer
- Lloyd James (footballer) (born 1988), Welsh professional footballer
- King Jammy, Lloyd James (born 1947), Jamaican dub mixer and record producer

== See also ==
- Arthur Lloyd James, Welsh phonetician
- James Lloyd (disambiguation)
