= Jamie Lloyd =

Jamie Lloyd may refer to:

- Jamie Lloyd (born 1980), British theatre director
- Jamie Lloyd (Halloween), fictional film character

== See also ==
- James Lloyd (disambiguation)
