= SS Charles Bulfinch =

Liberty ship of WWII

History

United States
- Name: Charles Bulfinch
- Namesake: Charles Bulfinch
- Owner: War Shipping Administration (WSA)
- Operator: Luckenbach Steamship Co., Inc.
- Ordered: as type (EC2-S-C1) hull, MCE hull 999
- Awarded: 30 January 1942
- Builder: Bethlehem-Fairfield Shipyard, Baltimore, Maryland
- Cost: $1,003,874
- Yard number: 2149
- Way number: 3
- Laid down: 14 May 1943
- Launched: 10 June 1943
- Sponsored by: Mrs. Milton G. Baker
- Completed: 22 June 1943
- Identification: Call sign: KIAC
- Fate: Laid up in the Hudson River Reserve Fleet, Jones Point, New York, 24 May 1948; Sold for scrapping, 7 January 1970, removed from fleet, 1 May 1970

General characteristics
- Class & type: Liberty ship; type EC2-S-C1, standard
- Tonnage: 10,865 LT DWT; 7,176 GRT
- Displacement: 3,380 long tons (3,434 t) (light); 14,245 long tons (14,474 t) (max)
- Length: 441 feet 6 inches (135 m) oa; 416 feet (127 m) pp; 427 feet (130 m) lwl
- Beam: 57 feet (17 m)
- Draft: 27 ft 9.25 in (8.4646 m)
- Installed power: 2 × Oil fired 450 °F (232 °C) boilers, operating at 220 psi (1,500 kPa); 2,500 hp (1,900 kW)
- Propulsion: 1 × triple-expansion steam engine, (manufactured by General Machinery Corp., Hamilton, Ohio); 1 × screw propeller
- Speed: 11.5 knots (21.3 km/h; 13.2 mph)
- Capacity: 562,608 cubic feet (15,931 m^{3}) (grain); 499,573 cubic feet (14,146 m^{3}) (bale)
- Complement: 38–62 USMM; 21–40 USNAG
- Armament: Varied by ship; Bow-mounted 3-inch (76 mm)/50-caliber gun; Stern-mounted 4-inch (102 mm)/50-caliber gun; 2–8 × single 20-millimeter (0.79 in) Oerlikon anti-aircraft (AA) cannons and/or, 2–8 × 37-millimeter (1.46 in) M1 AA guns

SS Charles Bulfinch was a Liberty ship built in the United States during World War II. She was named after Charles Bulfinch, an American architect. Bulfinch is best known for his designs of the Massachusetts State House, and the wings and central portion of the US Capitol.

== Construction ==
Charles Bulfinch was laid down on 14 May 1943, under a Maritime Commission (MARCOM) contract, MCE hull 999, by the Bethlehem-Fairfield Shipyard, Baltimore, Maryland; she was sponsored by Mrs. Milton G. Baker, the wife of a yard employee, and was launched on 10 June 1943.

== History ==
She was allocated to Luckenbach Steamship Company, on 22 June 1943. On 10 January 1948, she was laid up in the Hudson River Reserve Fleet, Jones Point, New York. On 4 May 1953, she was withdrawn from the fleet to be loaded with grain under the "Grain Program 1953", she returned loaded on 18 May 1953. On 25 November 1957, she was withdrawn from the fleet to be emptied of grain, she returned empty on 2 December 1957. On 10 October 1958, she was withdrawn from the fleet to be loaded with grain under the "Grain Program 1958", she returned loaded on 27 October 1958. On 19 October 1959, she was withdrawn from the fleet to be emptied of grain, she returned empty on 23 October 1959. On 15 November 1960, she was withdrawn from the fleet to be loaded with grain under the "Grain Program 1960", she returned loaded on 25 November 1960. On 8 March 1963, she was withdrawn from the fleet to be emptied of grain, she returned empty on 14 March 1963. On 7 January 1970, she was sold for scrapping to Steel Factors, Ltd., for $65,130. She was removed from the fleet on 1 May 1970.

== Bibliography ==
- "Bethlehem-Fairfield, Baltimore MD". www.ShipbuildingHistory.com. 14 August 2008.
- Maritime Administration. "Charles Bulfinch". Ship History Database Vessel Status Card. U.S. Department of Transportation, Maritime Administration.
- Davies, James (May 2004). "Specifications (As-Built)" (PDF). p. 23.
- "SS Charles Bulfinch".
