= St. Stephen's Church (Boston) =

Historic church in Massachusetts, United States

- U.S. National Register of Historic Places
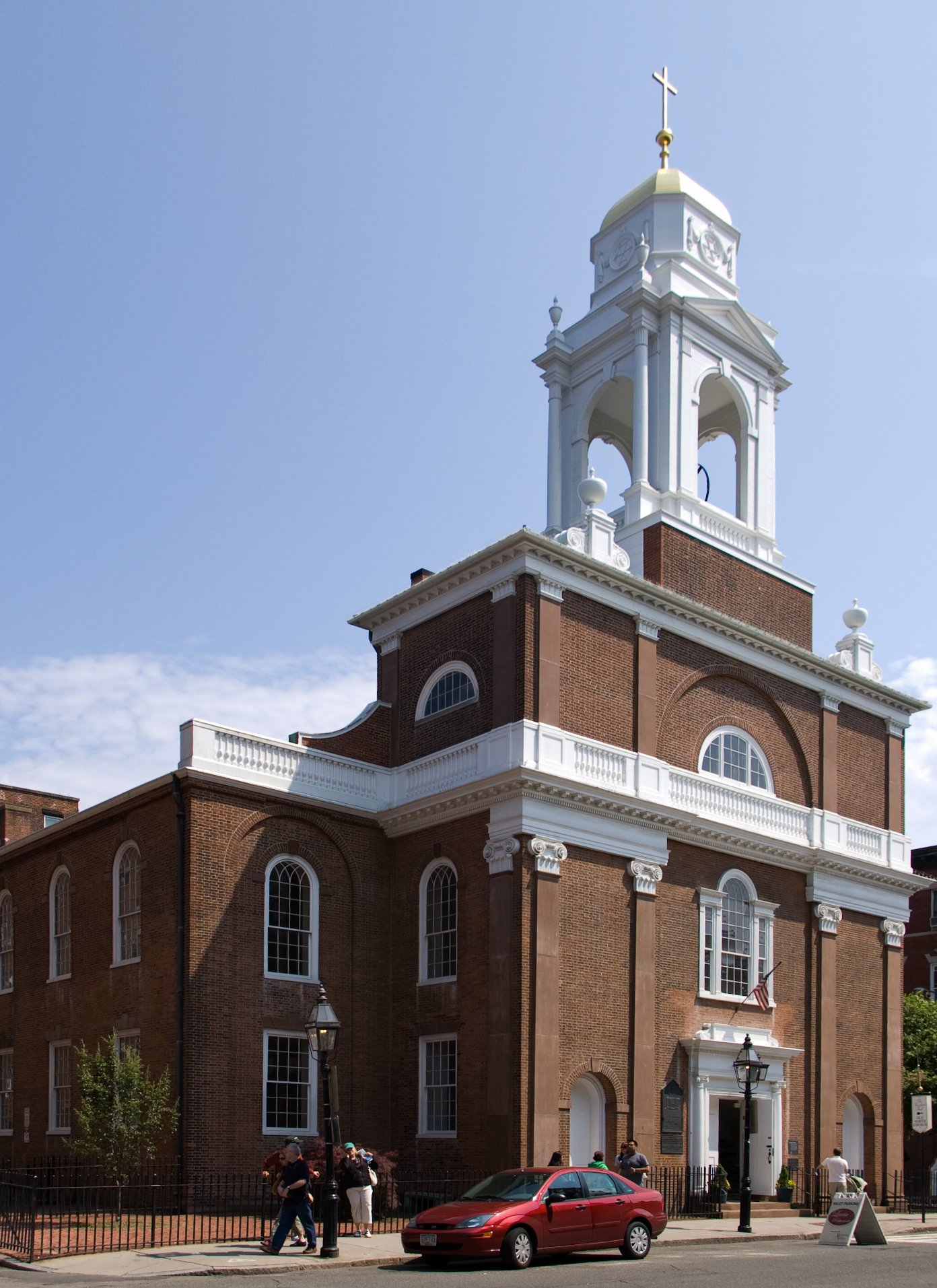
- St. Stephen's Church, Boston
- Location: 401 Hanover Street; Boston, Massachusetts
- Coordinates: 42°21′56.21″N 71°3′10.11″W
- Built: 1804
- Architect: Charles Bulfinch
- Architectural style: Federal
- NRHP reference No.: 75000300
- Added to NRHP: April 14, 1975

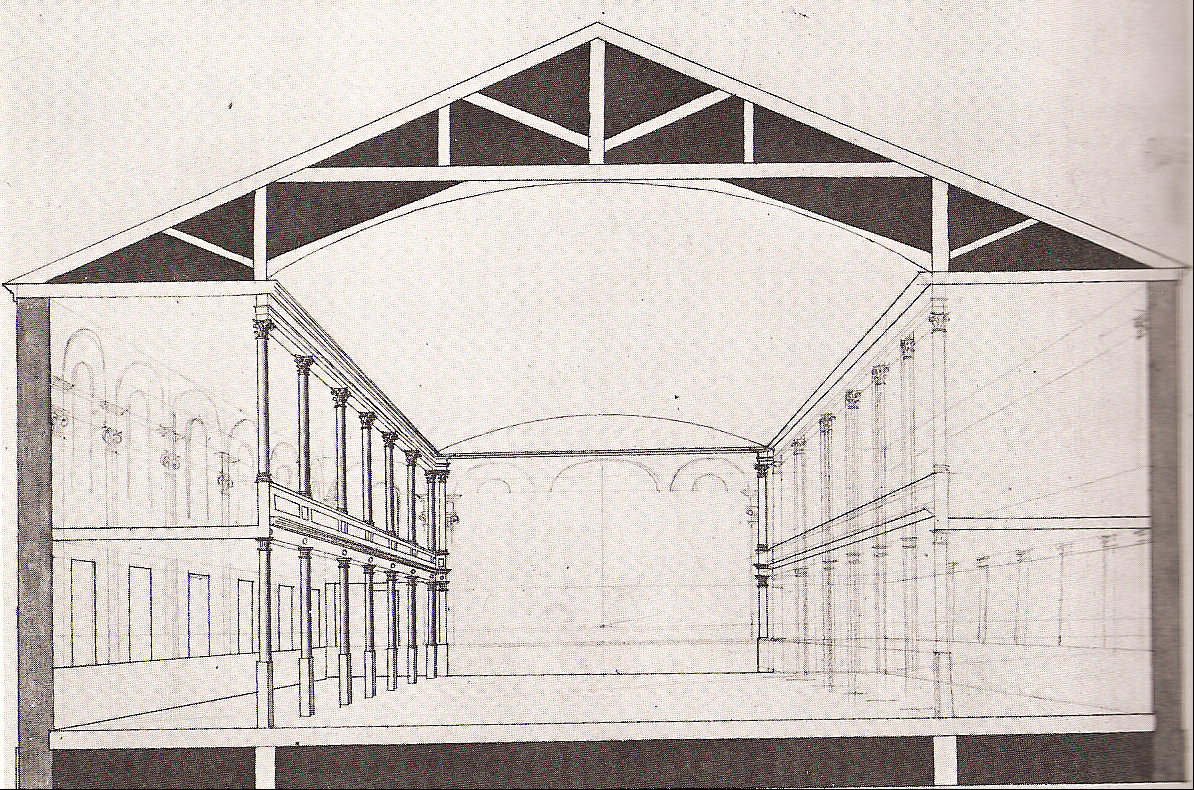
Bulfinch's sketch of the interior.

St. Stephen's Church is a historic church in the North End of Boston, Massachusetts. It was built in 1802–1804 as the New North Church or New North Meeting House and was designed by the noted architect Charles Bulfinch. It is the only one of the five churches he designed in Boston to remain extant. The church replaced one which had been built on the site in 1714 and enlarged in 1730. The Congregationalist church became Unitarian in 1813, and the church was sold to the Roman Catholic Diocese in 1862, and renamed St. Stephen's. It was restored and renovated in 1964–1965 by Chester F. Wright, and was added to the National Register of Historic Places in 1975.

== Design and construction ==
The church, made of red brick with white pilasters on the façade and topped by a clock tower and a belfry, was originally designed as the second edifice of the New North Religious Society, a Congregationalist group. Its cornerstone was laid on September 23, 1802, and the building dedicated on May 2, 1804. Three days later the Columbian Centinel wrote:

The exterior is in a bold and commanding style; the front is decorated with stone pilasters of a composed order; a series of attic pilasters over them, a tower and a cupola, terminated with a handsome vane, about 100 feet from the foundation. The inside is a perfect square of 72 feet; two ranges of dorick columns under the galleries, and Corinthian over them, support the ceiling, which rises in an arch of moderate elevation in the centre.

Bulfinch's specifications show that the church was designed nearly square, with inside dimensions of 70' (length) × 72'. A transverse section exhibits roof framing similar to that of Holy Cross Church. Some of the timber of the old church (built 1714, rebuilt 1730) was used, and when the Bulfinch building was restored in 1964–65, the underpinning was found to be entirely sound. However, the roof was less skillfully constructed, and severe leakage was arrested only after the pitch was sharpened and the whole covered with imported slate a few years after dedication.

The church cost $26,570, nearly all of which was raised by the sale of pews. Charles Shaw judged it "a commodious brick building," while William Bentley, who thought it took too long to build, nevertheless commended its "good style."

== Transitions ==
=== Unitarian ===
Like many Boston congregations of the time, New North went over to Unitarianism, and from 1813 to 1849, Rev. Dr. Francis Parkman (1788–1852), an eloquent preacher and father of historian Francis Parkman, was its minister. By 1822 the church was complaining that “the young gentlemen who have married wives in other parts of the town have found it difficult to persuade them to become so ungenteel as to attend worship in the North End”; Parkman himself preferred to live in the vicinity of Bowdoin Square.

In 1849 Rev. Joshua Young was ordained as its pastor.

=== Catholic ===
In 1862, with the North End's composition greatly changed by an influx of Irish Catholics, the church was sold to Bishop Fitzpatrick of the Roman Catholic Diocese of Boston and renamed St. Stephen's. In the conversion the weathervane was removed, a peak built over the original domed cupola in the manner of Holy Cross Church, and a cross and clock added. Either at this time or after the fire of 1897, the arched windows in the altar were blocked up and other changes made in the interior. When Hanover Street was widened in 1870 the edifice was moved back 16 feet and raised more than 6 feet above the original foundation.

The Church is now the home church for the Missionary Society of St. James the Apostle. In 1992 it became part of St. Leonard's Parish.

== Restoration ==
In 1964 Cardinal Richard James Cushing authorized the restoration of the church, including the lowering of the building upon its original foundation and the reconstruction of the Bulfinch cupola. Chester F. Wright was architect for the rebuilding and the work was done by Isaac Blair & Co., the same firm that had raised and moved the church almost a century earlier. During the restoration a careful search was made for evidence of the original work, and in the process the old copper-covered dome was found beneath the false cap and the side entrance doors, complete with hardware, were discovered bricked up in the porch. George E. Ryan wrote of the restoration work:

By summer's end, 1965, St. Stephen's Church ... had been moved a total of 25 feet – up, down, and backwards – in a history that began more than 160 years ago. The first move, about 12 feet back, was effected about 1870 when the city widened Hanover Street. The second, shortly afterwards, when a growing population of Irish Catholics in the North End ran out of space in the main church auditorium and literally "scooped out" a lower church by raising the building 6½ feet and "inserting" another level. The third move – a modern project that restored the venerable edifice to its 1804 condition – dropped St. Stephen's down again, back to the ground-level dictated by ... Bulfinch.

The interior is not entirely faithful to the Bulfinch design, although the pulpit and pews are copied from originals long held in a Billerica, Massachusetts church. The brownstone pilasters in the façade were meant to be painted white to simulate marble, as in a number of surviving houses on Beacon Hill.

== Kennedy connections ==
At one time, Mayor John "Honey Fitz" Fitzgerald was a parishioner of St. Stephen's; his daughter Rose Fitzgerald Kennedy was baptized here in 1890, and her funeral was held here in 1995.

== See also ==
- National Register of Historic Places listings in northern Boston, Massachusetts

== Bibliography ==
- Kirker, Harold (1969) The Architecture of Charles Bulfinch, Cambridge, Massachusetts: Harvard University Press. pp. 168–172.
