= India Wharf =

Wharf in Boston, Massachusetts (1804–1962)

Coordinates: 42°21′28.25″N 71°3′0.62″W

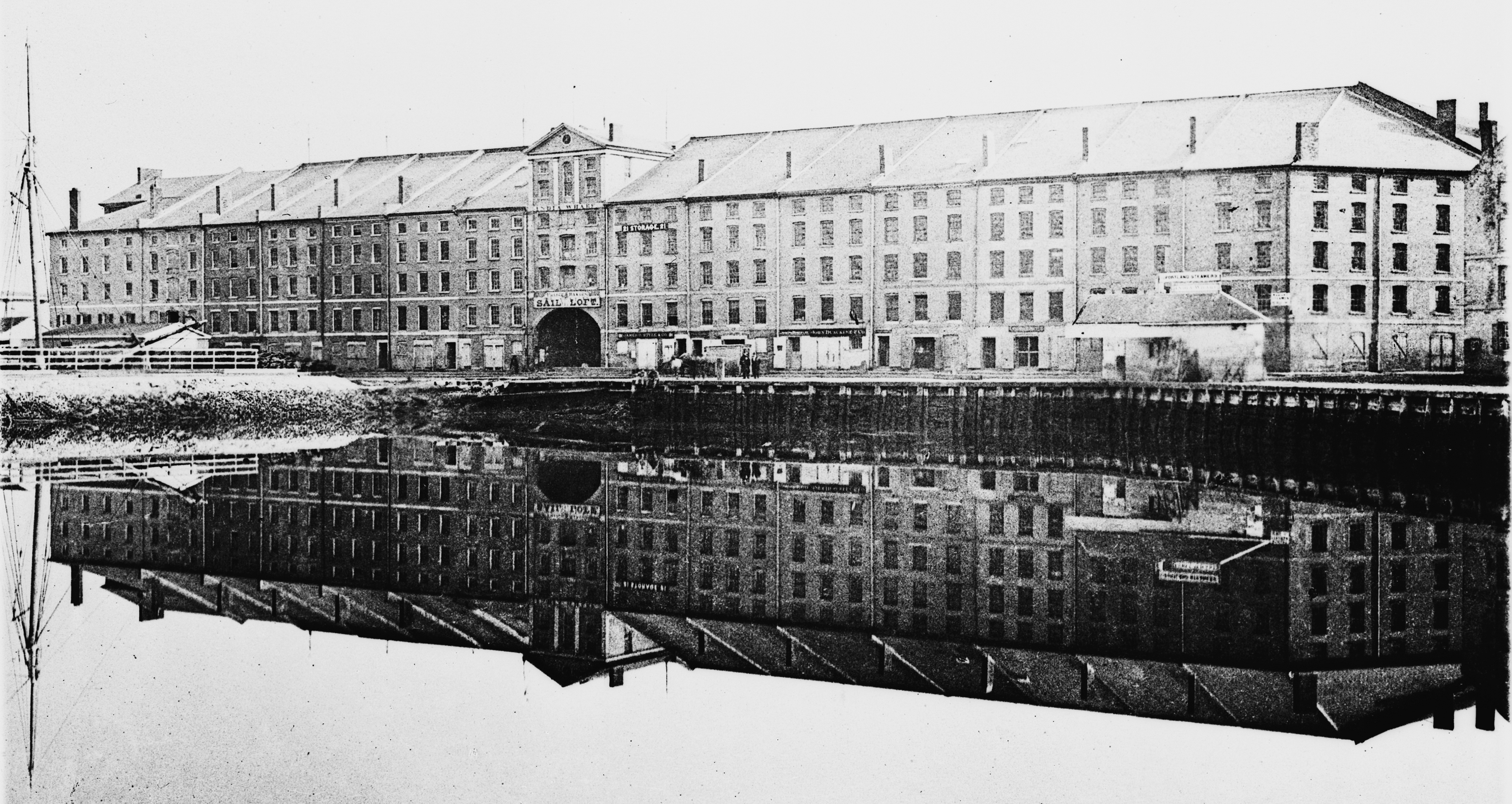
India Wharf, Boston, 19th century

India Wharf (1804-c. 1962) in Boston, Massachusetts, flourished in the 19th century, when it was one of the largest commercial wharves in the port. The structure began in 1804 to accommodate international trade at a time when several other improvements to the Boston waterfront occurred, such as the creation of Broad Street and India Street.

== History ==
Funders and organizers of the construction of India Wharf in 1803 on the waterfront near Long Wharf included Francis Cabot Lowell, Uriah Cotting, Henry Jackson, James Lloyd Jr., and Harrison Gray Otis. Builders completed the wharf in 1804. Architect Charles Bulfinch designed the building atop the wharf, completed in 1807. The long stone building housed 32 stores. An observer in 1815 described: "Across from the long wharves, or in the western part of the city, the India Wharf runs from north to south. An immense stone store, 1,340 feet in length, is divided into rooms containing merchandise from the East Indies...."

Merchants operating from India Wharf included China traders Russell and Company (1824); Samuel Austin, Jr.; James Carter; J.T. Coolidge; Samuel Devens; Thomas Dixon; Francis Ellis; Thomas and Edward Motley; Henry Oxnard; John Pratt & Son; Robert B. Storer; Thwing & Perkins. Also on the wharf were grocers Edward Keays and John Worster; cooper John Lang; broker Joseph Hall; iron dealers Perrin & Ellis; painter Jacob Thaxter; hairdresser Lewis Johnson. Other firms included "Thomas Wigglesworth; W.F. Cunningham & Co.; George T. Lyman; Bullard & Lee; the Higginsons;... W. Windsor Fay; E.A. Homer; B. Burgess; Minot & Hooper; Boardman & Pope; all well-known merchants of their day. ...Here also were the consulates of Sweden, Norway, Belgium, and Russia." The Norris and Baxter dining saloon maintained a presence on the wharf, c. 1857.

Through the mid-19th century, India Wharf became Boston's "headquarters of the trade with the Orient and many valuable cargoes from Canton, Calcutta, Russia and the Mediterranean ports were discharged there. ...There were 30 stores in the block. Many Bostonians of today can recall the time when several large square riggers were moored at the wharf, unloading their cargoes of tea, coffee, spices and fruit." Shipping activity continued on the wharf into the 20th century.

Demolition of the wharf and the long building occurred in stages, c. 1868-1962. Since 1971, the brutalist high-rise Harbor Towers have occupied the former site of India Wharf.

== Images ==
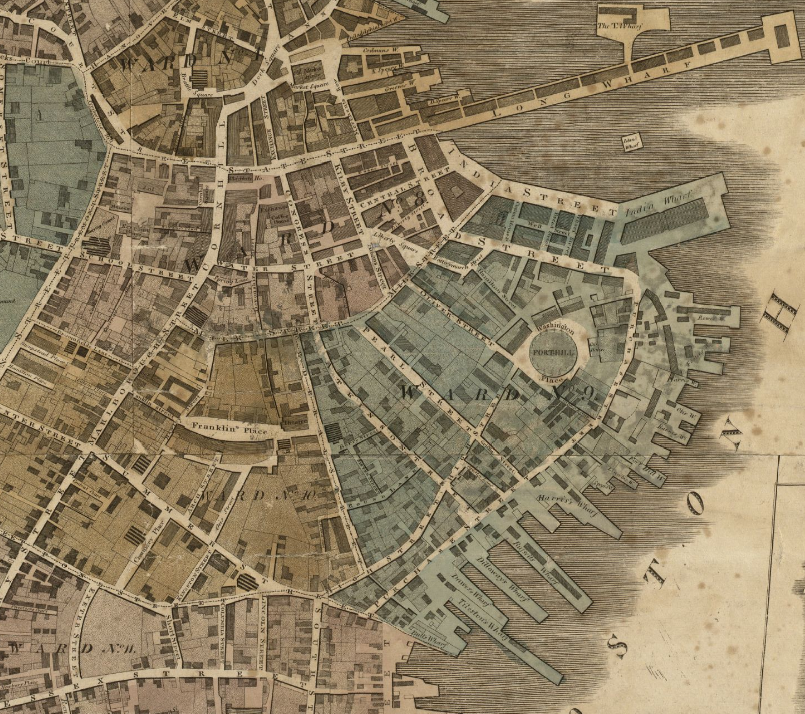
Detail of 1814 map of Boston, showing India Wharf and vicinity

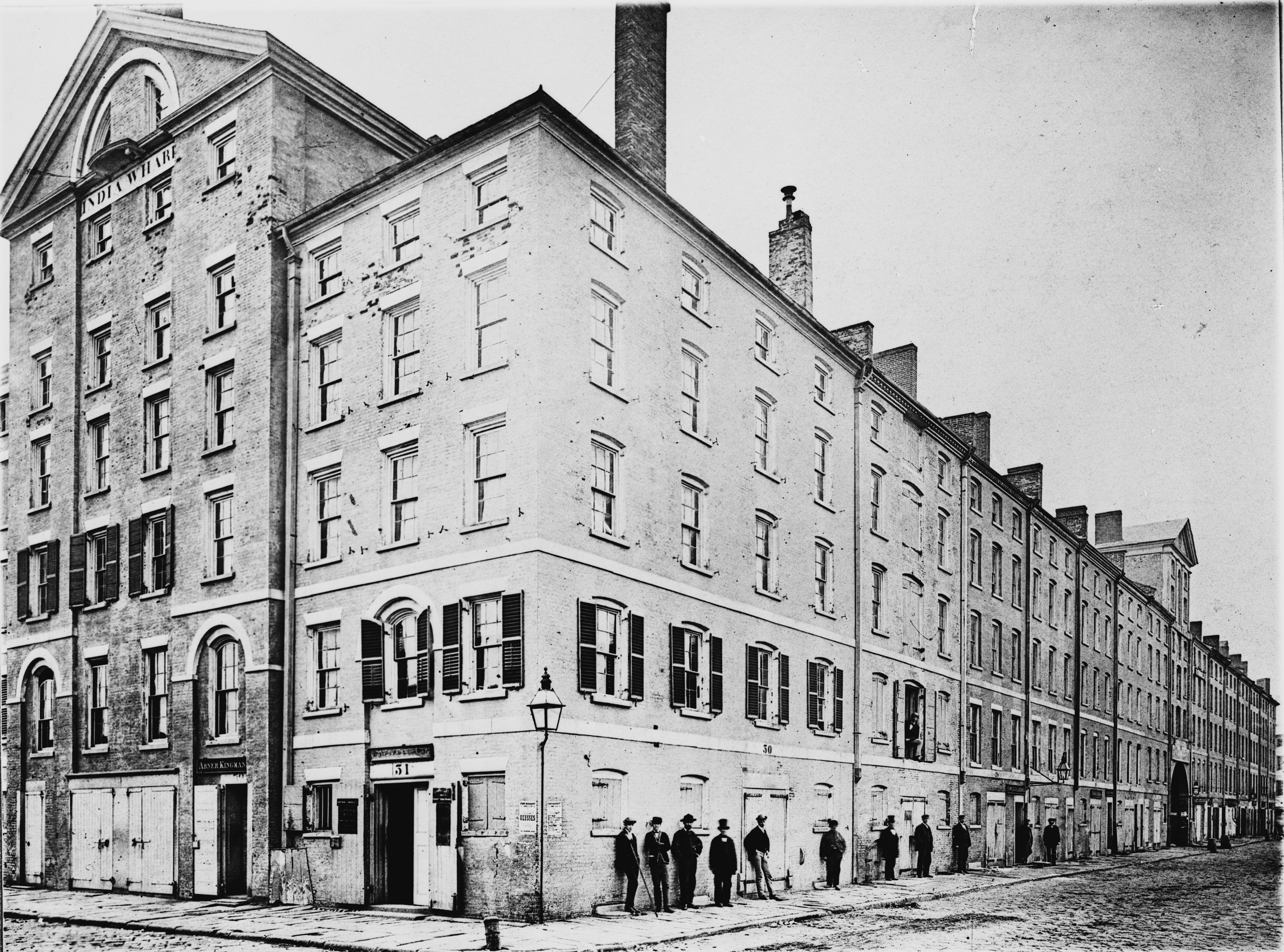
India Wharf, Boston, 19th century

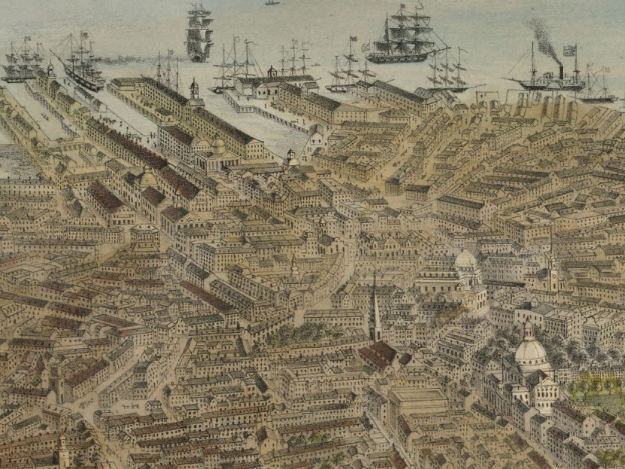
Overview of wharves, 1870 (India Wharf 3rd from left)

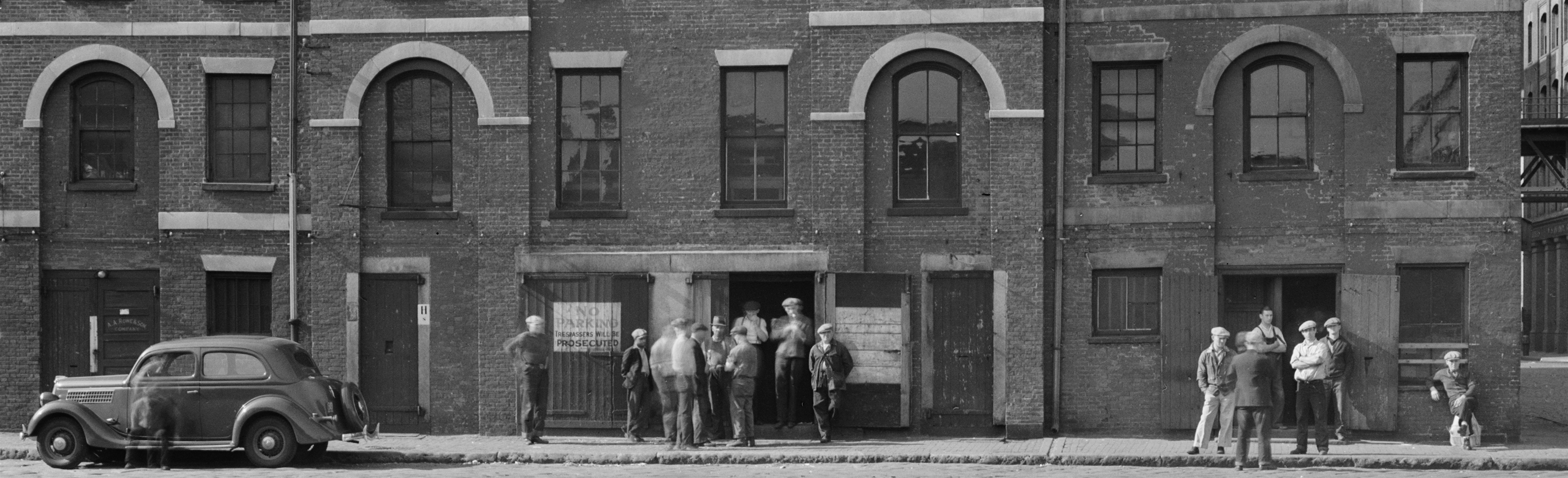
India Wharf, Boston, 1935

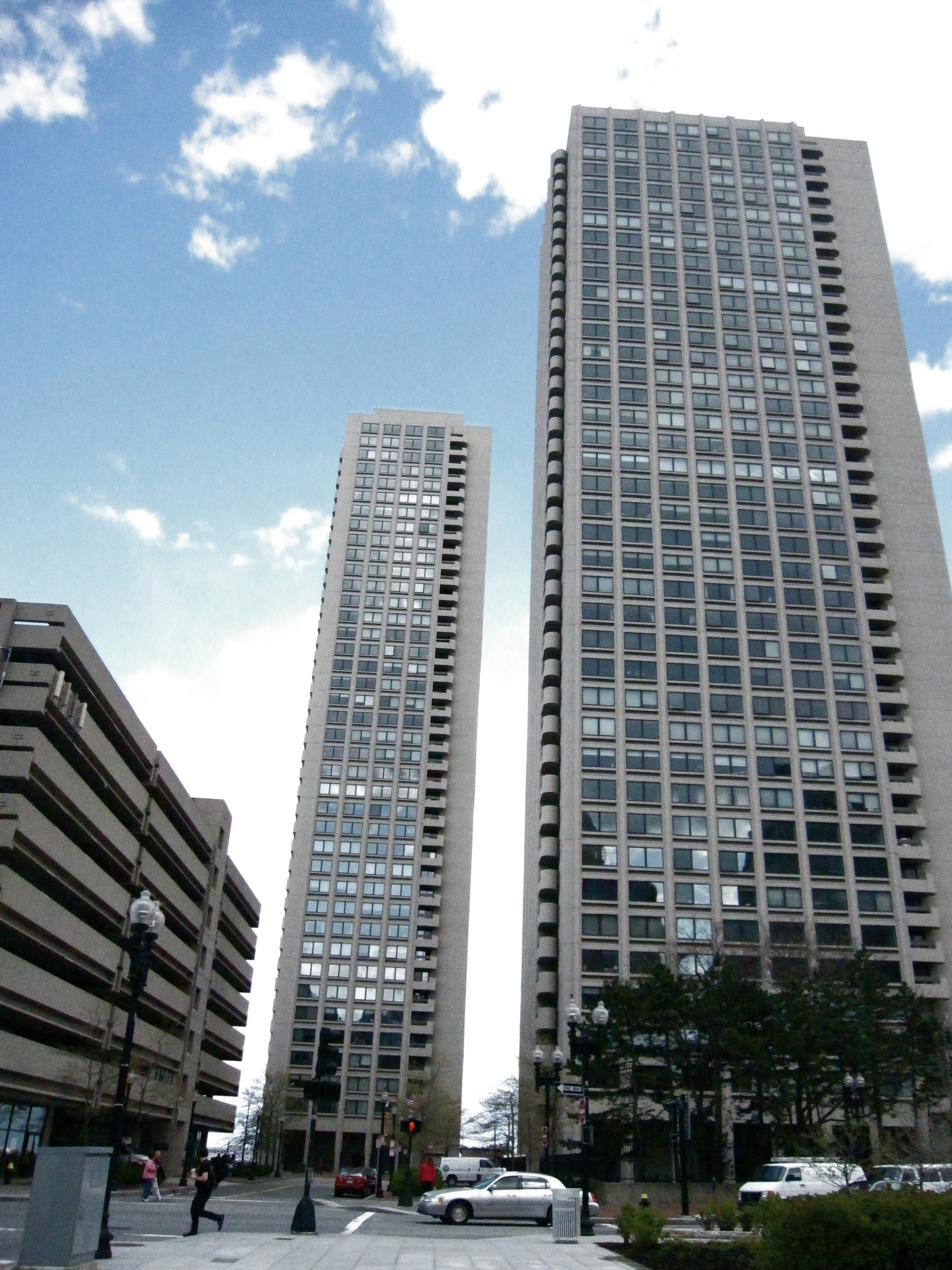
Harbor Towers, on former site of India Wharf, 2010

== See also ==
- Maritime Fur Trade
