= Superior Courthouse and Bartlett Mall =

Courthouse in Newburyport, Massachusetts

- U.S. National Register of Historic Places
- U.S. Historic district – Contributing property
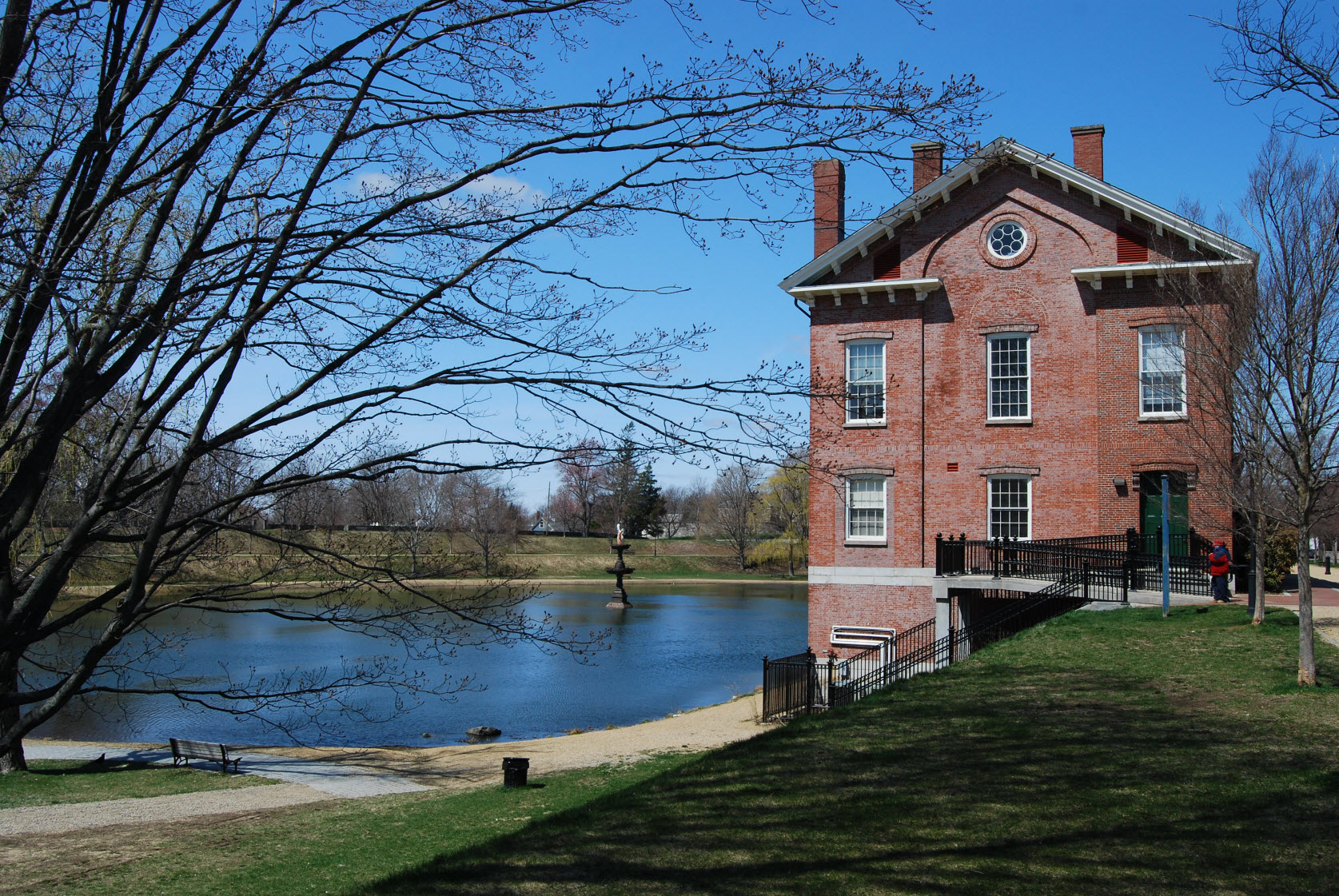

- Location within Massachusetts Location within the United States
- Location: Newburyport, Massachusetts
- Coordinates: 42°48′7″N 70°52′30″W
- Built: 1800
- Architect: Charles Bulfinch
- Part of: Newburyport Historic District (ID84002411)
- NRHP reference No.: 76000280

Significant dates
- Added to NRHP: April 30, 1976
- Designated CP: August 2, 1984

The Superior Courthouse and Bartlett Mall are, respectively, one of the oldest active courthouses in the nation, and one of the oldest public grounds in the city of Newburyport, Massachusetts. The mall and courthouse were listed on the National Register of Historic Places in 1976, and included in the Newburyport Historic District in 1984.

== Superior Courthouse ==
The courthouse, designed by architect Charles Bulfinch who also designed the Massachusetts State House in Boston, was built in 1805. Architecturally, the building has two stories and was designed and built in the Federal style. Originally, the courthouse had brick pillars and arches that supported the second floor, and also displayed a statue of "a female figure, representing Justice, holding a pair of scales in her right hand."

The Courthouse has undergone various renovations since 1805, first in 1853, when the front side of the courthouse was remodeled, the statue of Justice was removed, and the roof replaced with Italianate; and then again in 1973. Author/Historian Euphemia Vale, in her 1854 history of Newburyport, wrote that "The [1853] alterations cost $12,400, and the new furnishing of the rooms brought the total expense of the improvements up to more than $13,000."

According to the paperwork on file with the government of Newburyport, after construction of the Superior Courthouse was completed as a joint undertaking by the town and county, annual town meetings were held therein until 1834. The space was also used during that time as a location for a summer school for girls. On April 18, 1834, a town committee was appointed to sell off the town's financial interest in the building. Their goal was achieved by June 3 of that same year and the property officially came under the ownership of Essex County.

Many historically relevant figures argued cases within the Superior Courthouse, including Daniel Webster, John Quincy Adams, and Caleb Cushing.

== Bartlett Mall ==
Bartlett Mall, which runs in front of the courthouses along High Street near its intersection with Green Street, predates the 1764 separation of Newburyport from Newbury.

Even prior to the building of the courthouse, it is noted that Bartlett Mall "has always been a focal point of the community."

== See also ==
- National Register of Historic Places listings in Essex County, Massachusetts
