= Holy Cross Church, Boston =

Church building in Massachusetts, United States

Coordinates: 42°21′19.45″N 71°3′26.19″W

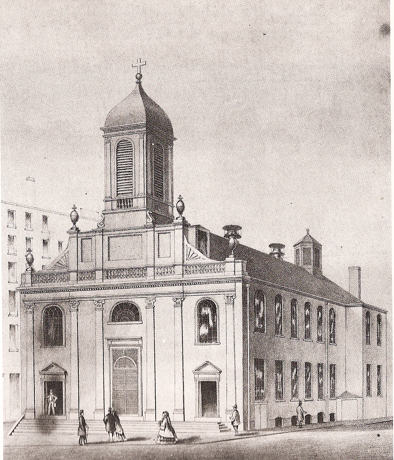
Holy Cross Cathedral in 1859.

The only known representation of the church interior; note the Sargent altarpiece.

Tablet marking the site.

The Church of the Holy Cross (1803-ca.1862) was a Catholic church located on Franklin Street in Boston, Massachusetts. In 1808, the church became the Cathedral of the Holy Cross. It was designed by Charles Bulfinch and was the first church built for the city's Catholics. The church's last Mass was celebrated on September 16, 1860. Demolition took place around 1862. The cathedral was replaced by a new Cathedral of the Holy Cross located in the South End.

== History of the Catholic presence in Boston ==
Prior to the erection of Holy Cross, Boston’s several hundred mostly French and Irish Roman Catholics met in a small, dilapidated former Huguenot meetinghouse made of brick and located on the south side of School Street, a few doors up from Washington Street. As this arrangement proved inadequate and the lease on the chapel was about to expire, in March 1799 a committee was appointed and charged with raising funds for the purchase of a building site and the procurement of plans for a proper church. A site was chosen at the southern end of the Tontine Crescent at what is today 214 Devonshire Street.

== Acquisition and construction ==
The property belonged to the Boston Theatre proprietors and Bulfinch, who was a member of the corporation, obtained the land at what Father François Matignon termed "the moderate price of 2500 Dols." Bulfinch then submitted plans for the church to his friend Father John Cheverus without fee. Ground was broken on March 17, 1800, and the building dedicated on September 29, 1803. The minutes of the building committee report "the thanks of the whole Society were voted and desired to be offered to Mr. James [sic] Bulfinch, Esq., for his kindness to the Congregation in having supplied us with a very elegant plan for our new Church, and such as united decency and ornament with economy and having shown himself a friend and Patron to us." In recognition for his charity, the Catholic faithful presented him with a fine silver tea-urn, now in the Museum of Fine Arts, Boston.

Bulfinch also pleased Boston's Catholics by assisting in the subscription taken to provide a building fund and his personal supervision of each stage of construction. About $17,000 was collected, more than one-fifth donated by Boston Protestants, who generally seemed in agreement with Shubael Bell, senior warden of Christ Church, that "no circumstance has contributed more to the peace and good order of the town, than the establishment of a Catholic church." President John Adams headed the list of non-Catholic donors, which included such Bulfinch patrons as Joseph Coolidge, Jonathan Mason, Stephen Higginson, Harrison Gray Otis, and Elias Hasket Derby of Salem. Bulfinch’s concern for the interior decorations sparked the interest of the painter Henry Sargent, who designed an altarpiece representing the Crucifixion.

== Architectural significance ==
Holy Cross was the second church Bulfinch designed in Boston. It represented certain visual advances over his Hollis Street Church (dem.) in its more proportionally balanced facade. Its specifications, as given in the architect’s handwriting, called for a building approximately 75’ x 58’ with a 30’ height; the square-headed windows in the ground story measured 4’ x 7’ and those above 4’ x 9’. The choir was placed in the gallery directly over the entrance on Franklin Street. Contemporary sources describe the church as being in the "Italian Renaissance" style, a designation prompted by placement of the cupola on a line with the front elevation and the use of a pair of Baroque consoles to conceal the pitch of the roof. It is uncertain whether the design of Holy Cross derived from London examples such as St Martin, Ludgate, or came directly from the architect’s memory of Roman churches he had seen, and possibly sketched, in 1786: Santo Spirito in Sassia and Santa Maria Vallicella. Such use of Renaissance forms was less common in New England at the time. It was employed by Bulfinch with a naïve charm that he repeated only once, on New North Church, designed a year after Holy Cross was consecrated.

== Elevation to cathedral status and replacement ==
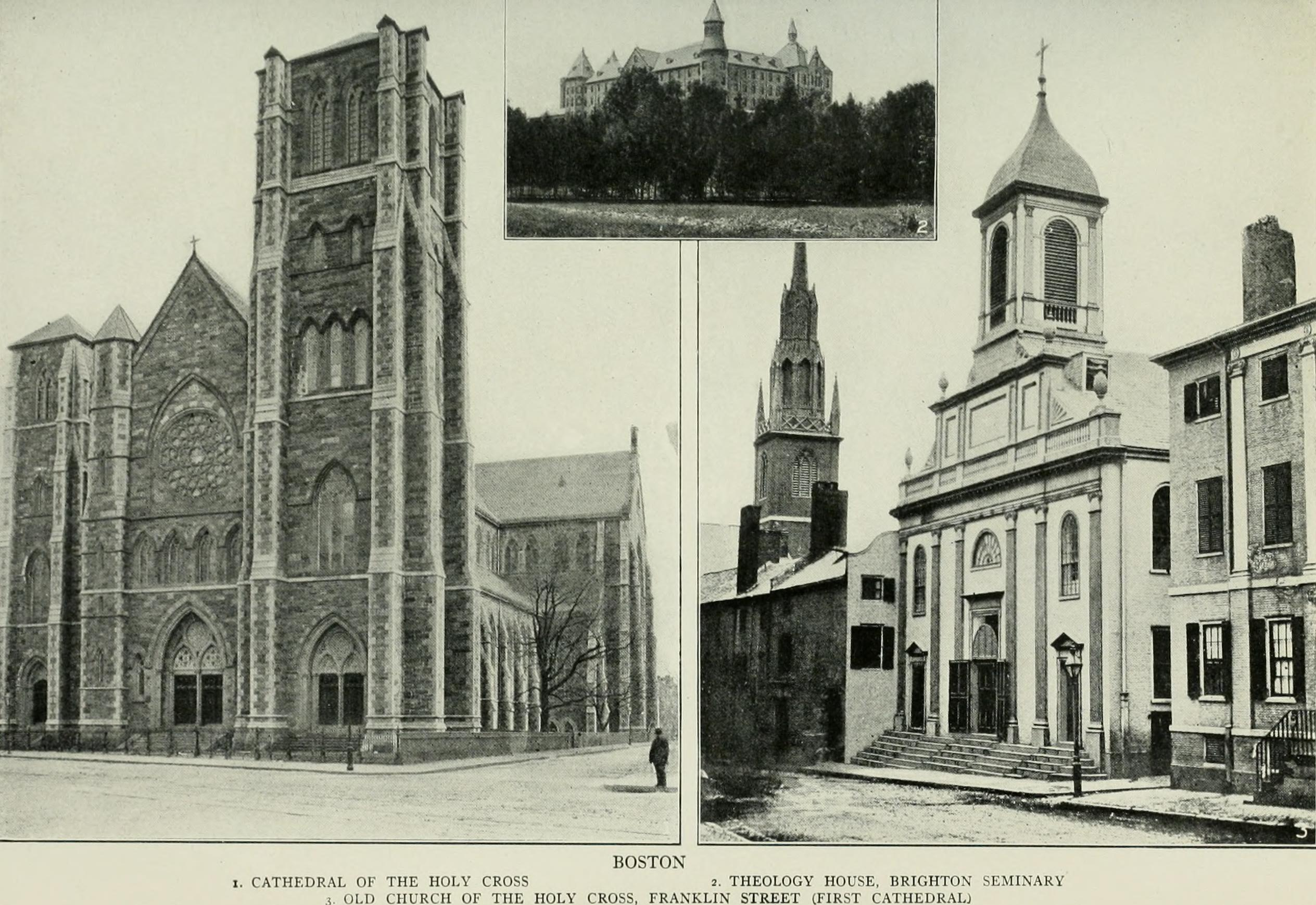
A side-by-side comparison of the new Holy Cross Cathedral in the South End (left) and the old Holy Cross on Franklin Street (right).

In 1808, when Pope Pius VII created the Diocese of Boston and Cheverus became its first bishop, the church became a cathedral. Enlarged in 1825, the building nonetheless proved too small for the city’s fast-growing Catholic population. Furthermore, the area had become commercial and the dilapidated cathedral was surrounded by business blocks. The last Mass, at which Bishop Fitzpatrick was reportedly too overcome with sadness to speak, was celebrated there on September 16, 1860 as sale of the site was underway and planning began for a new cathedral; demolition took place around 1862.

In 1950, an engraved tablet was placed adjacent to the St. Thomas More Oratory entrance at 49 Franklin Street. It reads: "Near this site stood THE CATHEDRAL OF THE HOLY CROSS, established 1803 by Jean Lefebvre de Cheverus, First Catholic Bishop of Boston; Missionary to the Penobscot Indians; Friend of President John Adams; Advisor to our State Legislature; One of America’s noblest priests. He stood by the bedside of Catholic and Protestant alike. This tablet placed by a group of Protestant Businessmen, 1950."
