= James Lloyd (obstetrician) =

American obstetrician (1728–1810)

James Lloyd APS
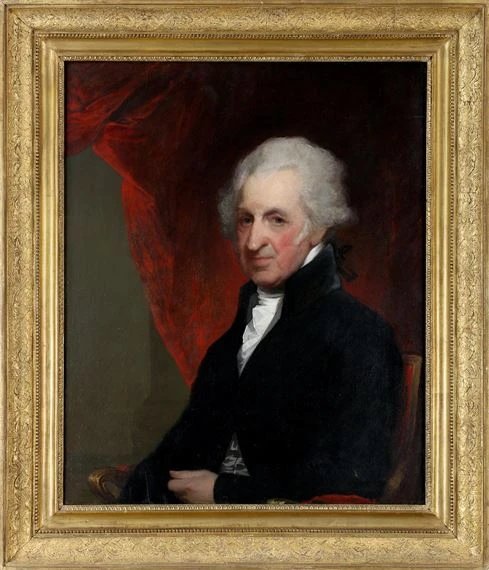
- Portrait of Lloyd by Gilbert Stuart
- Born: March 24, 1728; Long Island, Province of New York
- Died: March 14, 1810 (aged 81); Boston, Massachusetts, U.S.
- Occupations: Obstetrician, surgeon
- Children: 2, including James Lloyd

James Lloyd (March 24, 1728 – March 14, 1810) was an American surgeon and obstetrician.

He was born at the Manor of Queens Village on Long Island, New York to Henry Lloyd and Rebecca Nelson. His father's sizable collection of medical texts may have inspired him to pursue a career as a doctor. James apprenticed and studied under the Boston physicians Silvester Gardiner and John Clark between 1745 and 1748, and, in 1749, traveled to London to work as a resident at Guy's Hospital. There, he learned groundbreaking surgical techniques like flap amputations, and attended lectures performed by pioneering surgeons and obstetricians. In 1759, Lloyd married Sarah Comrin (Comryn) (1734–1797) in Boston. Together they had two children: Sarah and James Lloyd III.

After completing his tenure in London, Lloyd returned to Boston, where, in addition to opening his own practice in surgery and obstetrics, he showed a commitment to educating a new generation of physicians. He performed lectures on the techniques he had learned abroad and apprenticed at least ten young doctors between 1760 and 1790. He was elected as a member to the American Philosophical Society in 1771.

At the outbreak of the Revolutionary War, Lloyd was serving as a surgeon for a British military unit based near Boston. For this, he was labeled a traitor and jailed, but was soon released in the hopes that he would use his medical skill to serve the patriot cause. After the war, the British offered Lloyd financial redress for his war-ravaged Long Island manor if he would become a British citizen. He refused. Lloyd was a founder of the Massachusetts Medical Society and thought to be the first specialized obstetrician in America.

James Lloyd died in Boston in 1810. John Sylverster John Gardiner gave his funeral sermon at Trinity Church in Boston.
