= Otis-Wyman House =

Historic house in Massachusetts, United States

- U.S. National Register of Historic Places
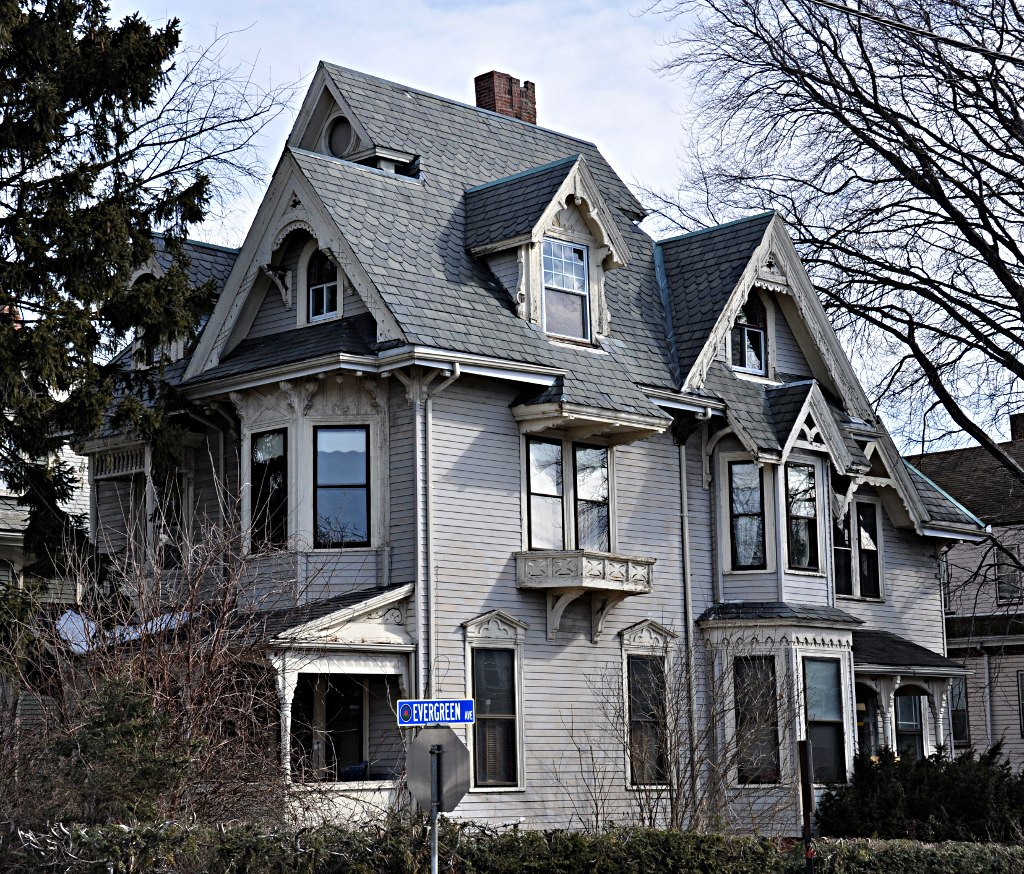

- Location within Massachusetts Location within the United States
- Location: Somerville, Massachusetts
- Coordinates: 42°23′31″N 71°5′51″W
- Built: 1883
- Architectural style: Queen Anne
- MPS: Somerville MPS
- NRHP reference No.: 89001289
- Added to NRHP: September 18, 1989

The Otis-Wyman House is a historic house at 67 Thurston Street in Somerville, Massachusetts. This 2 1/2-story wood-frame house, built c. 1883, is a well-preserved example of Queen Anne styling. It has projecting gable sections, bays, and porches typical of the style, as well as decorative trim elements such as bargeboard, bracketed eaves, and gabled window hoods. It was originally owned by William R. Otis, a cabinetmaker, and later the residence of Charles B. Wyman, a restaurant owner.

The house was listed on the National Register of Historic Places in 1989.

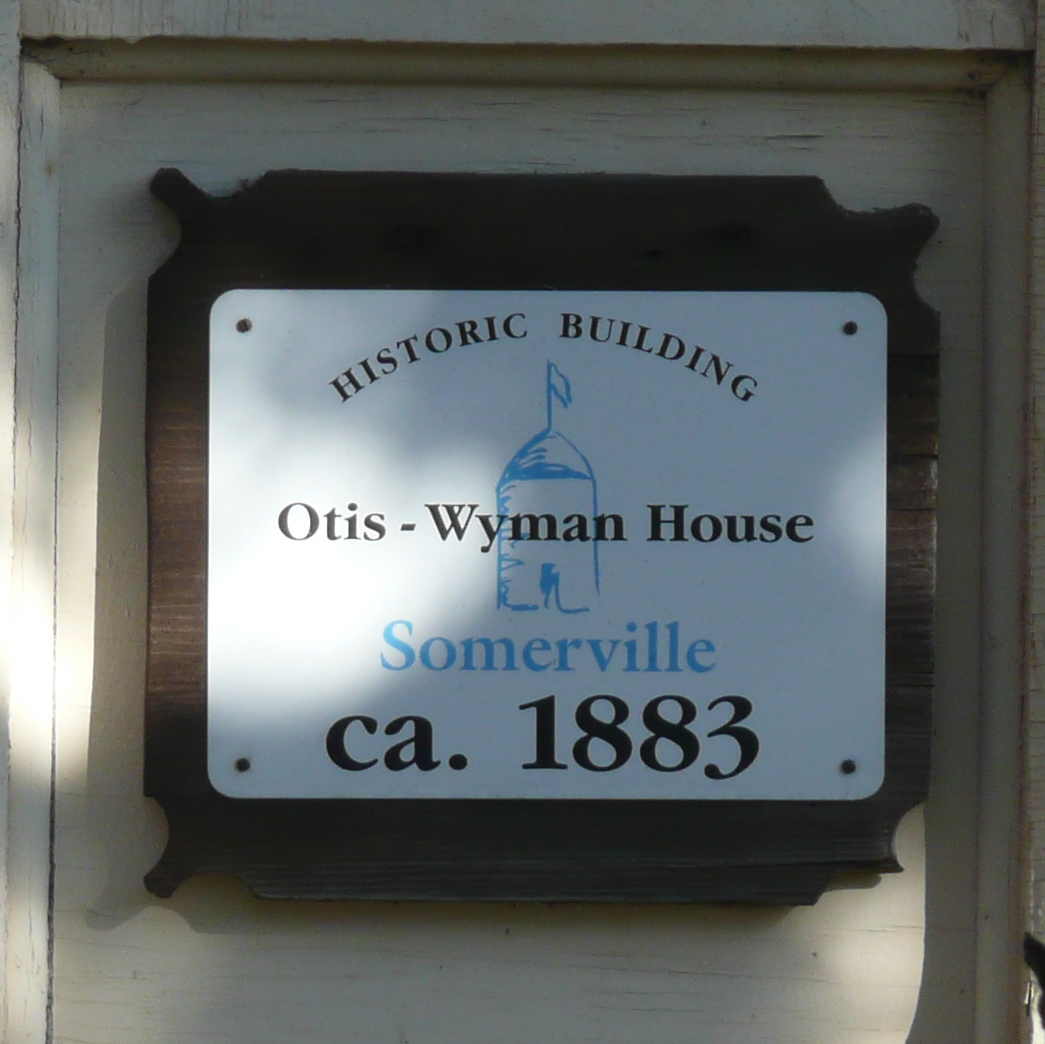
The identifying sign on the face of the Otis-Wyman House

== See also ==
- National Register of Historic Places listings in Somerville, Massachusetts
