= James Lloyd (Massachusetts politician) =

American politician

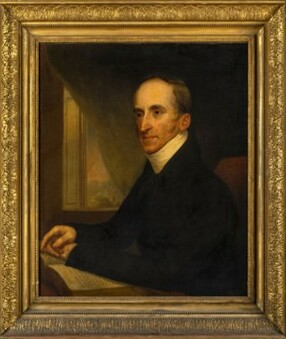

United States Senator from Massachusetts
- In office June 9, 1808 – May 1, 1813
- Preceded by: John Quincy Adams
- Succeeded by: Christopher Gore
- In office June 5, 1822 – May 23, 1826
- Preceded by: Harrison Gray Otis
- Succeeded by: Nathaniel Silsbee

Member of the Massachusetts Senate
- In office 1804-1812

Member of the Massachusetts House of Representatives
- In office 1800-1804

Personal details
- Born: December 1769 Boston, Massachusetts
- Died: April 5, 1831 (aged 61) New York City, New York
- Party: Federalist
- Education: Harvard College
- Occupation: Merchant

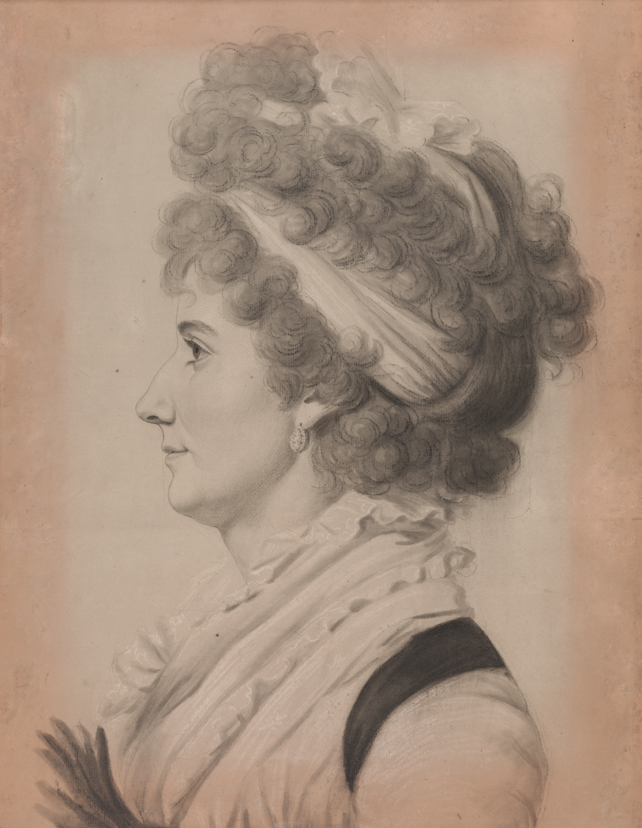
Lloyd's wife, Hannah Breck Lloyd, portrait by Charles Balthazar Julien Fevret de Saint-Mémin

James Lloyd (December 1769 – April 5, 1831) was a merchant, businessman and Federalist party politician from Massachusetts during the early years of the United States. He twice served as United States Senator, notably succeeding John Quincy Adams after the latter lost the party vote due to his support of the Embargo Act of 1807.

== Early life and business ==
James Lloyd was born in Boston, Province of Massachusetts Bay, to James Lloyd, a top medical doctor in Boston, and Sarah (Curwin) Lloyd. Lloyd was educated at Boston Latin School and Harvard College, where he received a BA in 1787 and an MA in 1790. He got a job as a merchant clerk, in which capacity he traveled to Russia in 1792.

Lloyd became a successful merchant, and was a close business associate of Francis Cabot Lowell. With Lowell, he was a major stakeholder the construction of Boston's India Wharf and Central Wharf, and was a major investor in the Boston Athenaeum. He served as the first president of the Boston Manufacturing Company, the first major textile mill in the nation.

== Political career ==
In 1800 Lloyd was elected to the Massachusetts House of Representatives, and in 1804 he won election to the state senate. In 1808, he won election to the United States Senate. The election, made by the state legislature, took place at an unusually early date, as it was designed as a snub of the sitting Federalist Senator, John Quincy Adams, for his support of the Embargo Act of 1807. Adams resigned his seat early, and Lloyd was appointed to fill the remainder of his term. He served until his resignation on May 1, 1813, due to poor health. On June 17, 1812, he voted against declaring war on Britain. On February 28, 1812, Lloyd gave a speech in the Senate of the United States on the Bill "Concerning the Naval Establishment".

Upon the resignation of Senator Harrison Gray Otis in 1822, he was again elected and reelected, serving until his resignation on May 23, 1826, again due to poor health. He was one of the last Federalist Party members to serve in the Senate.

Lloyd died in New York City and is buried in King's Chapel Burying Ground in Boston. He was elected a Fellow of the American Academy of Arts and Sciences in 1811 and a member of the American Antiquarian Society in 1820.

U.S. Senate
Preceded by John Quincy Adams	U.S. senator (Class 1) from Massachusetts; 1808–1813; Served alongside: Timothy Pickering, Joseph B. Varnum	Succeeded by Christopher Gore
Preceded by Harrison Gray Otis	U.S. senator (Class 2) from Massachusetts; 1822–1826; Served alongside: Elijah H. Mills	Succeeded by Nathaniel Silsbee
