= Harrison Gray Otis House =

United States historic place

There are three houses named the Harrison Gray Otis House in Boston, Massachusetts. All were built by noted American architect Charles Bulfinch for the same man, Federalist lawyer and politician Harrison Gray Otis.

== First Harrison Gray Otis House ==
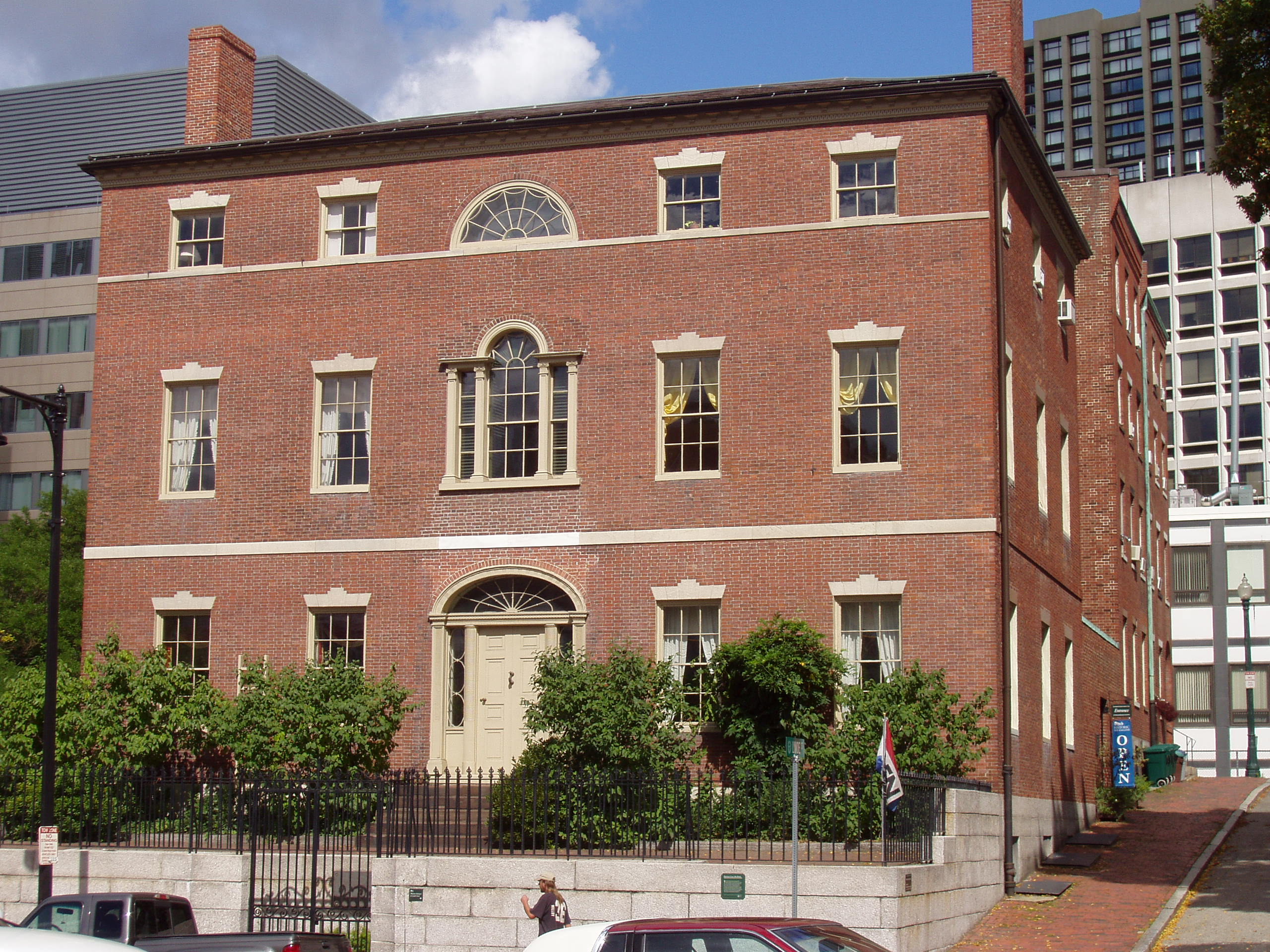
1st Harrison Gray Otis House on Cambridge Street

The first Otis house, built in 1796, is located at 141 Cambridge Street, next to the Old West Church in Boston's West End. It is now a National Historic Landmark, and a historic house museum owned and operated by Historic New England, which also uses part of it as its administrative headquarters.

== Second Harrison Gray Otis House ==
- Harrison Gray Otis House (Second)
- U.S. National Register of Historic Places
- U.S. National Historic Landmark District – Contributing property
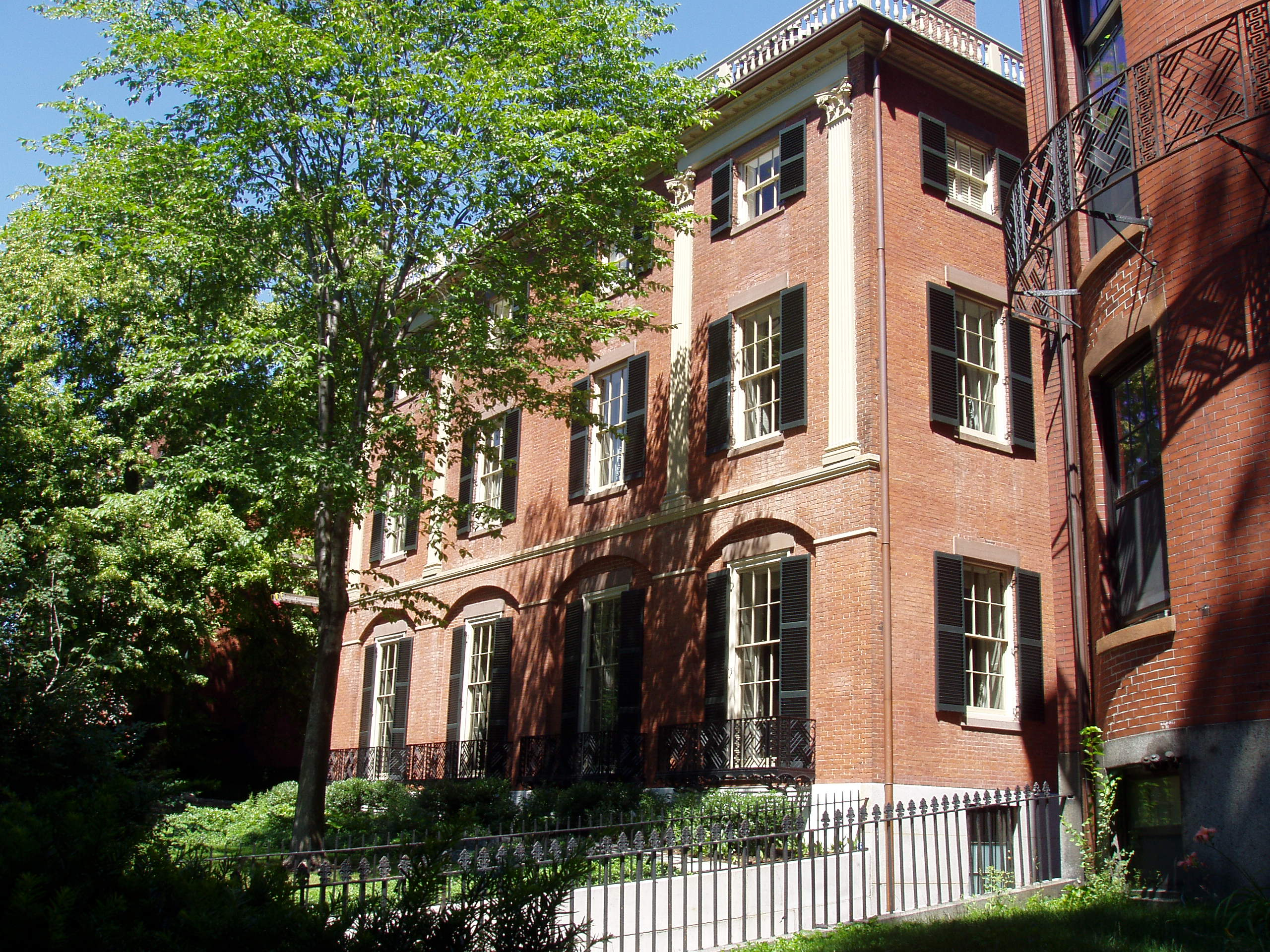
- 2nd Harrison Gray Otis House, 85 Mount Vernon Street

- Location within Boston Location within Massachusetts Location within the United States
- Location: Boston, Massachusetts
- Coordinates: 42°21′29.89″N 71°4′3.22″W
- Built: 1802
- Architects: Bulfinch, Charles
- Architectural style: Federal
- Part of: Beacon Hill Historic District (ID66000130)
- NRHP reference No.: 73001955

Significant dates
- Added to NRHP: July 27, 1973
- Designated NHLDCP: October 15, 1966

The Second Harrison Gray Otis House is located at 85 Mount Vernon Street. It is a large, square, Federal-style mansion in densely developed Beacon Hill, built in 1800–1802. It is three stories in height, with brick walls laid in Flemish bond, and is set on a parcel with a relatively ample lawn, and a semicircular cobblestone drive, the latter a rare surviving remnant of the original vision for the development of Beacon Hill by the Mount Vernon Proprietors. The house was listed on the National Register of Historic Places in 1973.

In this house Bulfinch has made the first floor with his characteristic recessed brick arches, here ornamented with Chinese fretwork balconies in iron. The facade has four bays, with somewhat odd use of Corinthian pilasters on the 2nd and 3rd floors. There is a roof balustrade and a largish, octagonal cupola. Otis lived here until 1806.

The house was portrayed as the home of Thomas Crown (Steve McQueen) in the 1968 Thomas Crown Affair film. It also served as the home of Thomas Banacek (George Peppard) in the TV show Banacek (1972–1974).

== Third Harrison Gray Otis House ==
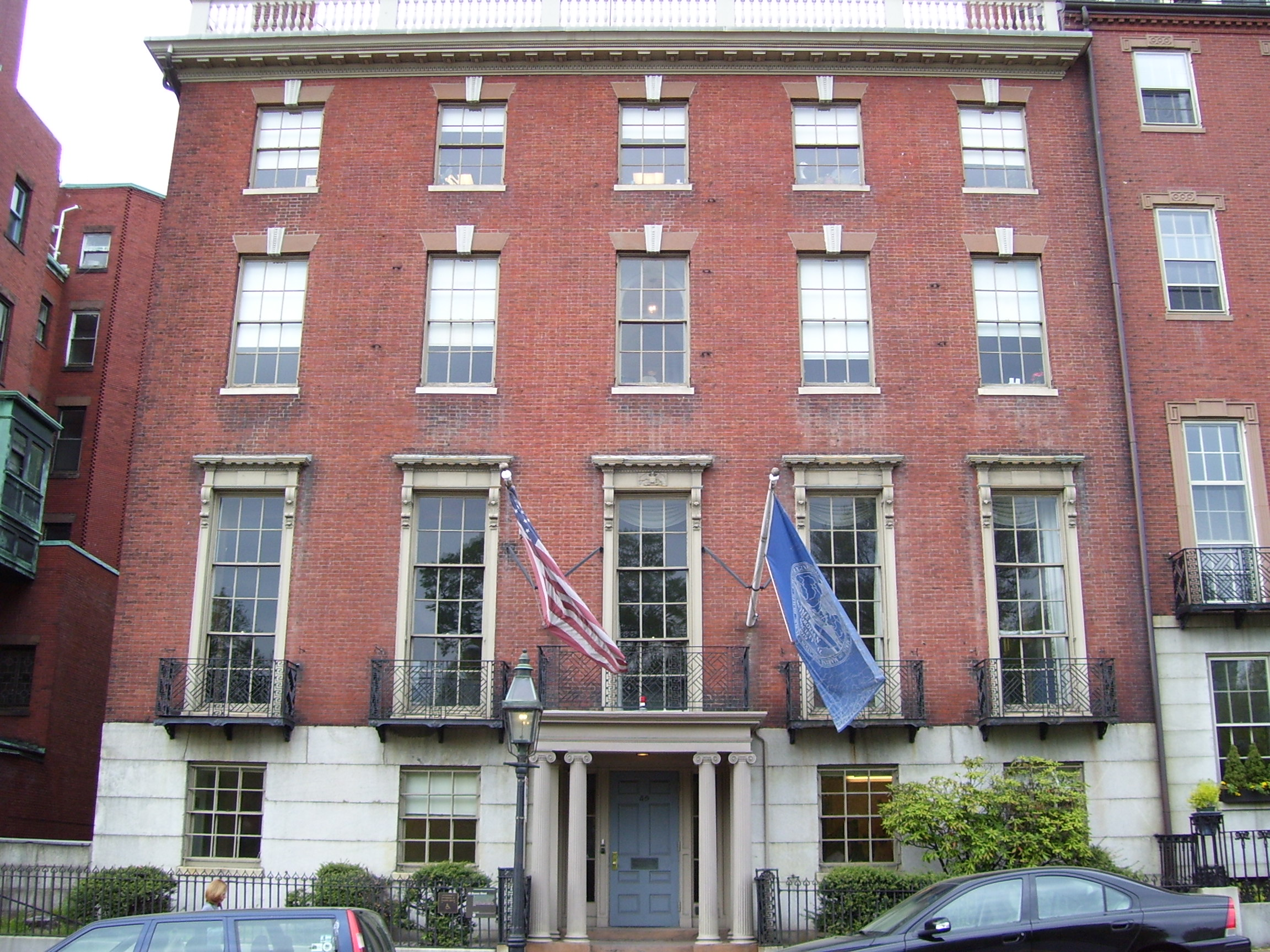
3rd Harrison Gray Otis House on Beacon Street

The Third Harrison Gray Otis House is located at 45 Beacon Street. Completed in 1806, it is now the home of the American Meteorological Society. This is the last and largest of the houses, also built in the Federal style, and the residence of Otis until his death in 1848. Its four stories are organized into five bays. The center entrance has a small, rectangular portico with delicate pairs of Ionic fluted columns. The modest ground floor, now faced in stone, originally had the recessed brick arches typical of Bulfinch houses. When built, the house was freestanding, surrounded by the Boston Common and English gardens.

== See also ==
- National Register of Historic Places listings in northern Boston, Massachusetts
