= Franklin Street (Boston) =

Street in Boston, Massachusetts

Coordinates: 42°21′19.91″N 71°3′22.79″W

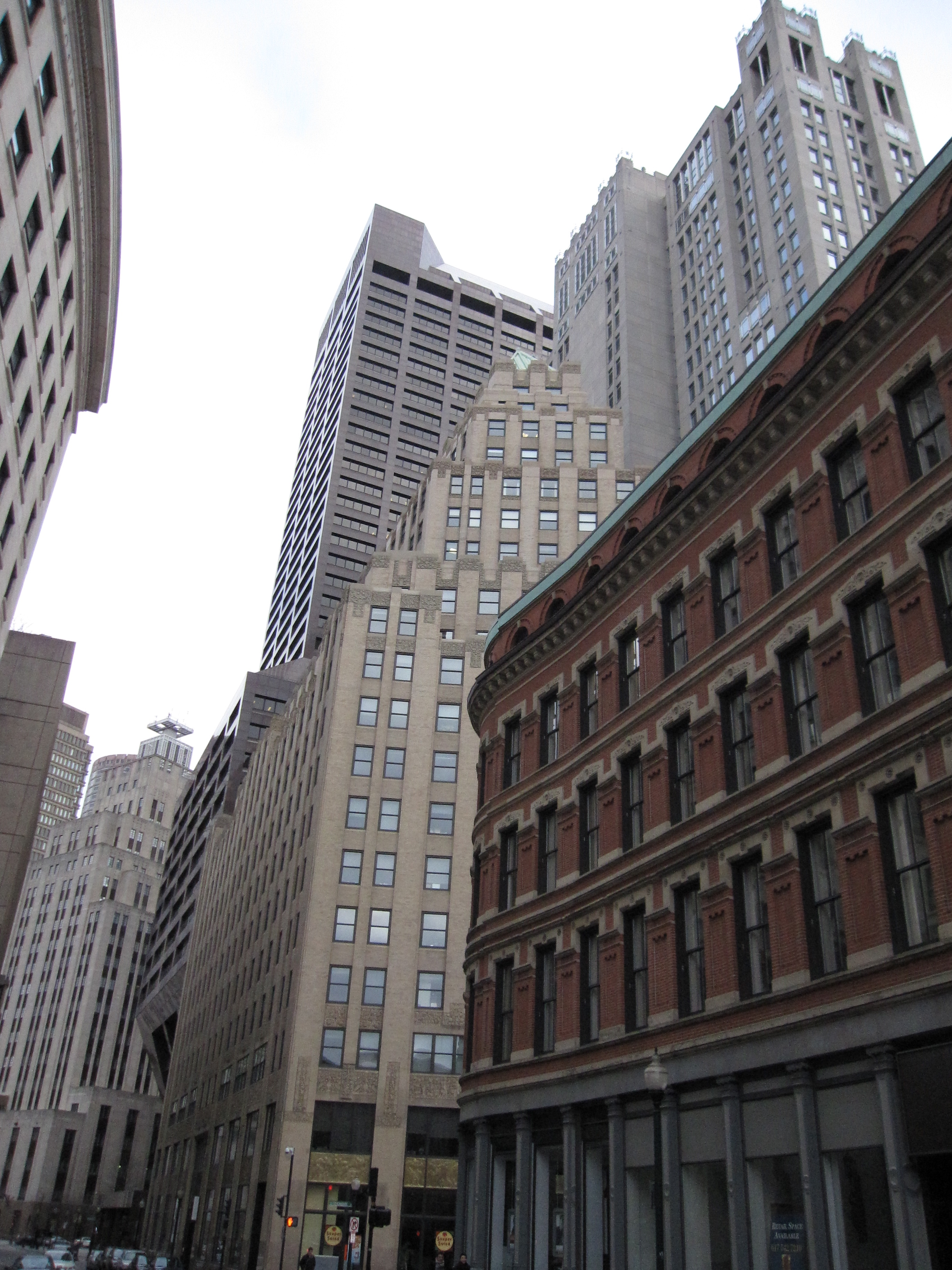
- Franklin Street, Boston, 2010
- Interactive map of Franklin Street
- Location: Boston
- West end: Washington Street
- Major junctions: Federal Street; Congress Street
- East end: India Street

Franklin Street (established c. 1798) is located in the Financial District of Boston, Massachusetts, United States.

== History ==
It was developed at the end of the 18th century by Charles Bulfinch, and included the now-demolished Tontine Crescent and Franklin Place.

== Former tenants ==
- George Melville Baker
- Boston Library Society
- Federal Street Theatre
- Abram French & Co., crockery shop, 19th century
- Holy Cross Church, Boston
- Lee & Shepard

== Gallery ==
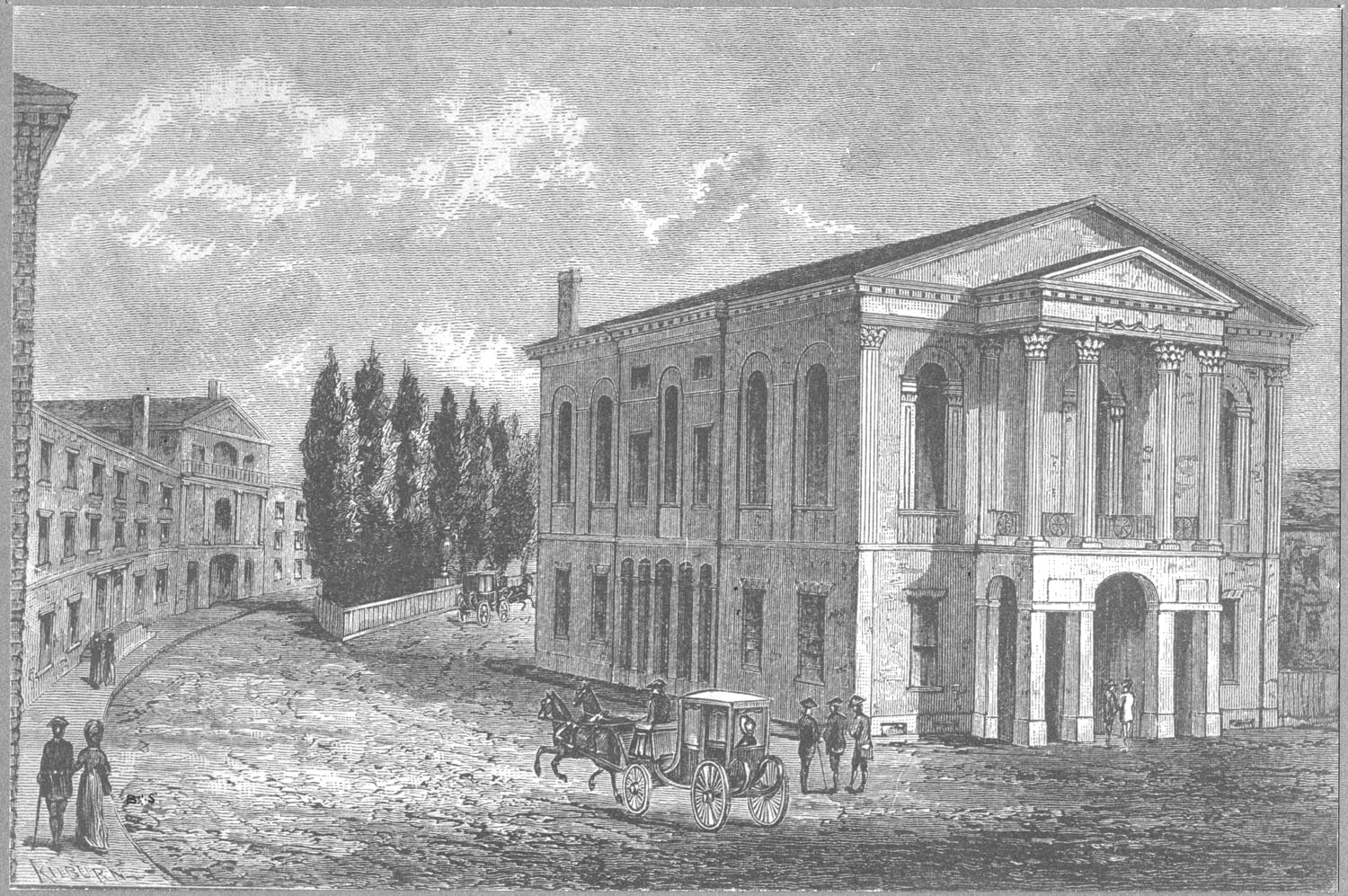
Federal St. Theatre, corner of Federal and Franklin St., c. 1798

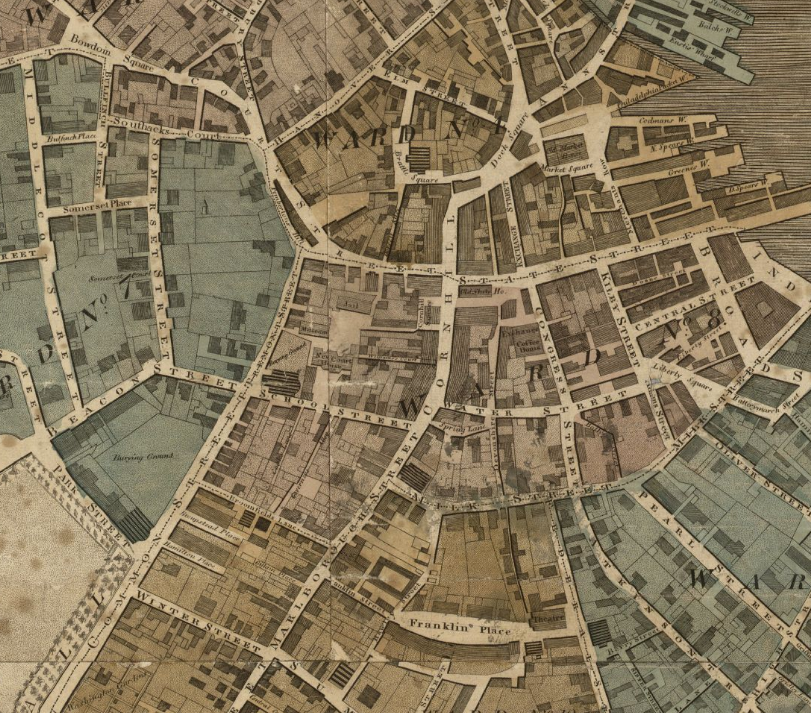
Detail of 1814 map of Boston, showing Franklin St., Franklin Place, and vicinity

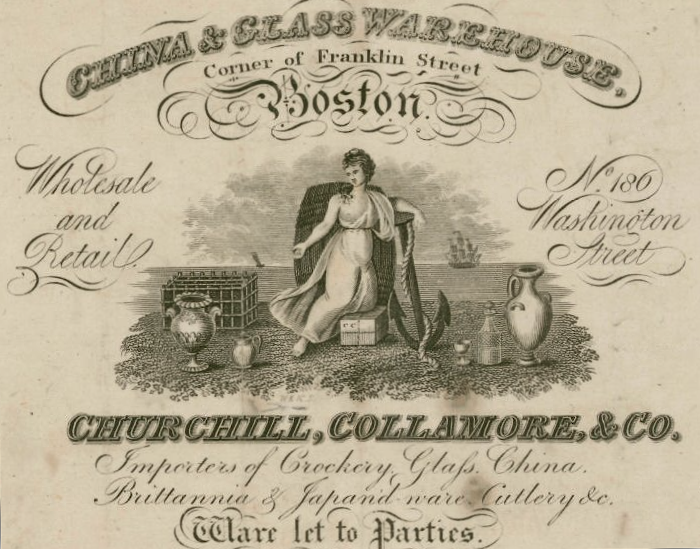
Churchill, Collamore, & Co., China & Glass Warehouse, corner of Franklin and Washington St., c. 1825

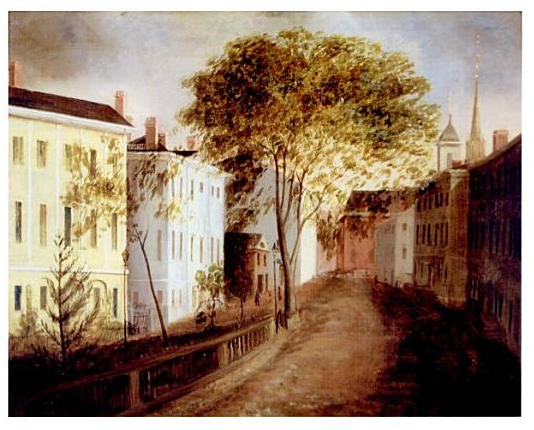
Franklin St., c. 1830

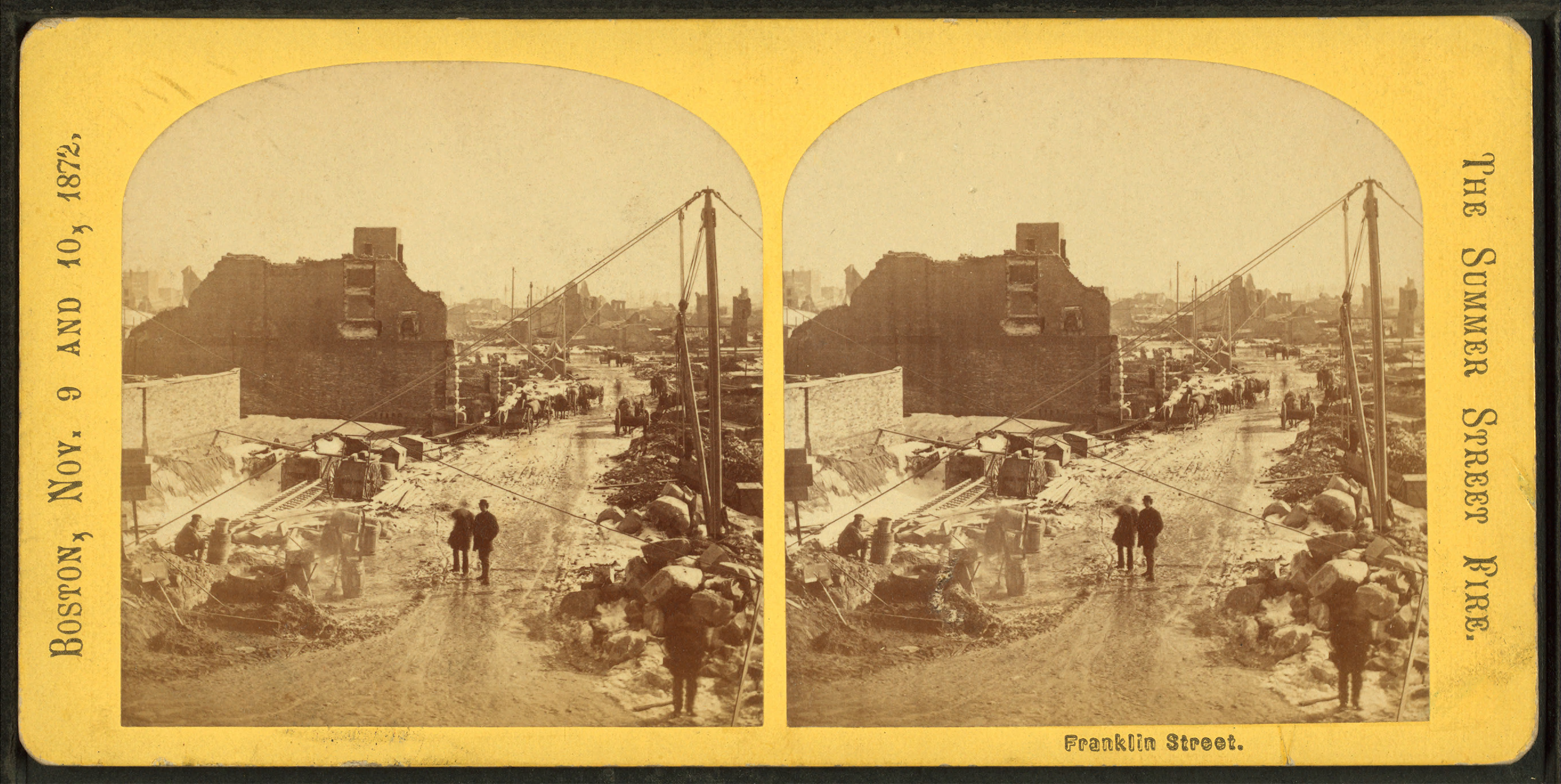
Franklin St. after the fire, 1872

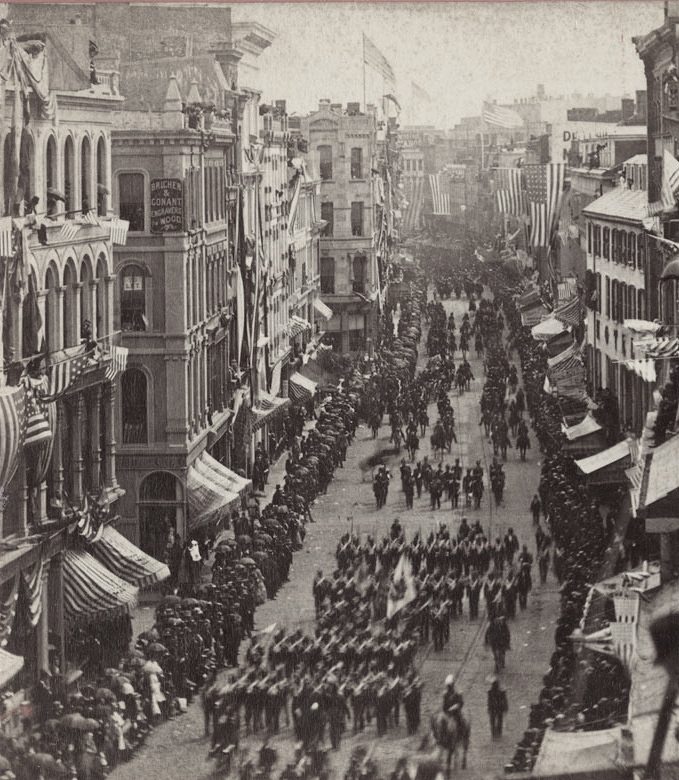
Parade, June 17, 1876

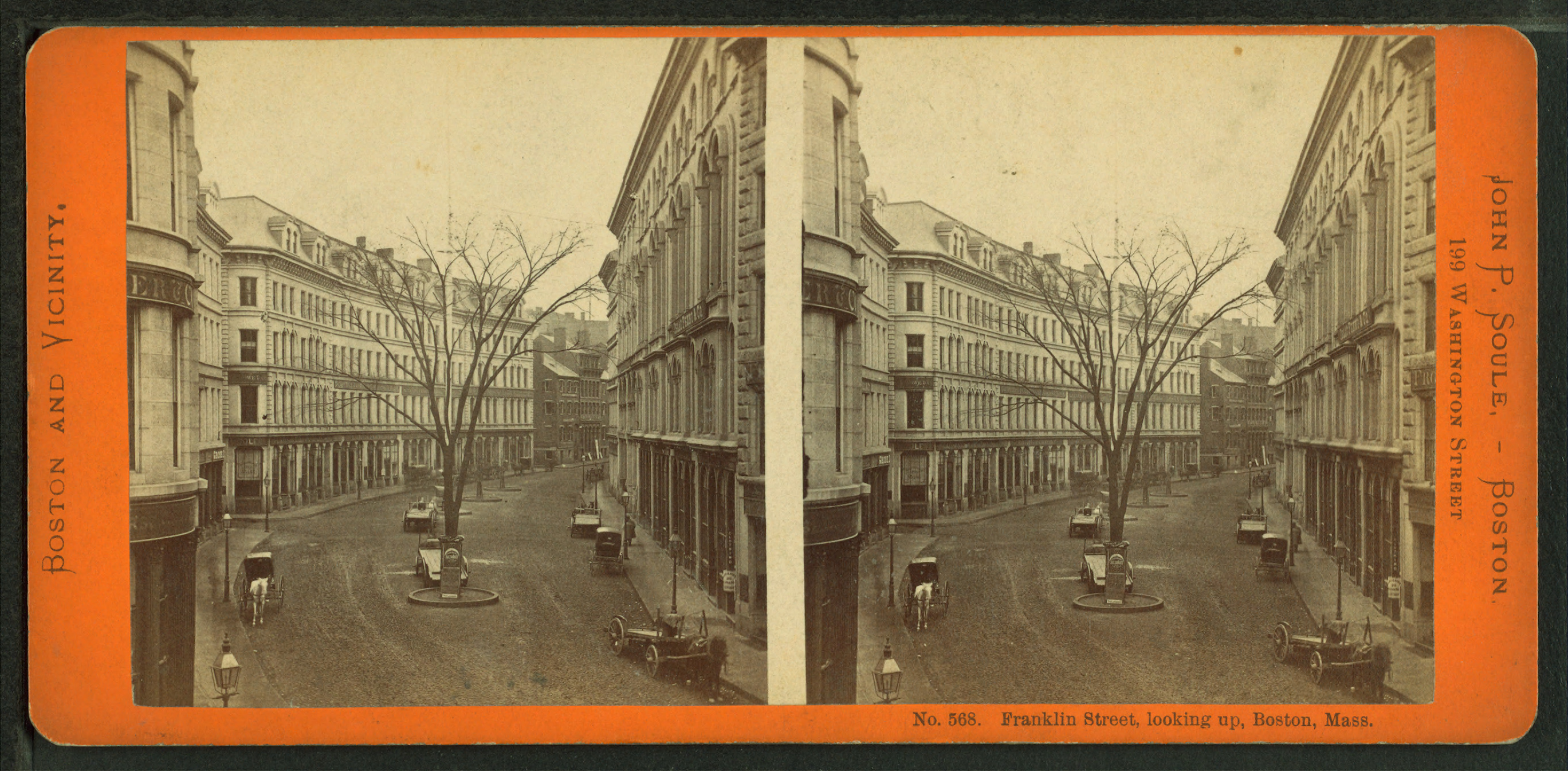
Photo by John P. Soule, 19th century

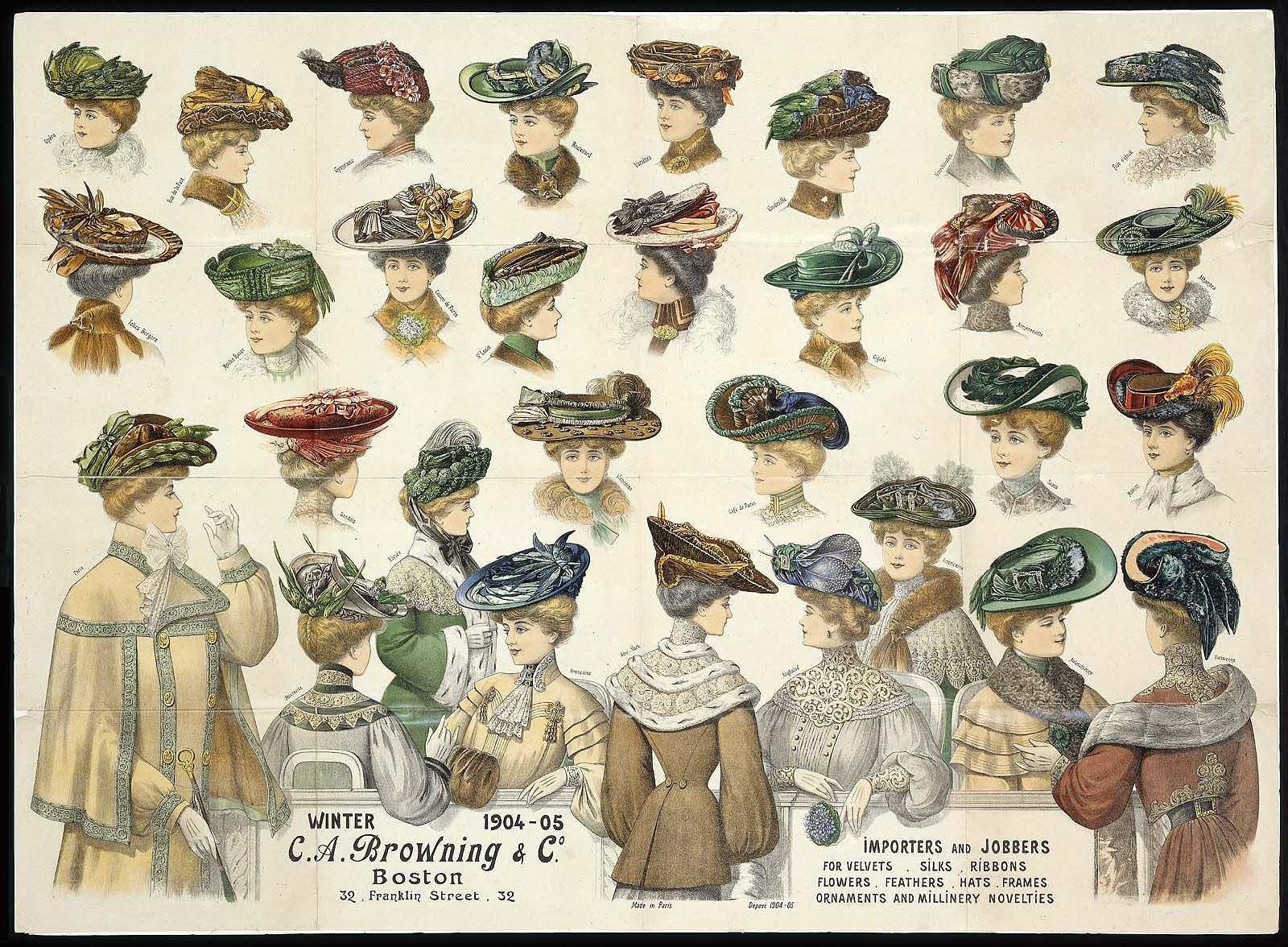
C.A. Browning & Co., 1904

== See also ==
- Franklin Place
- State Street Bank Building
- Wigglesworth Building
