= Abram French =

American businessman

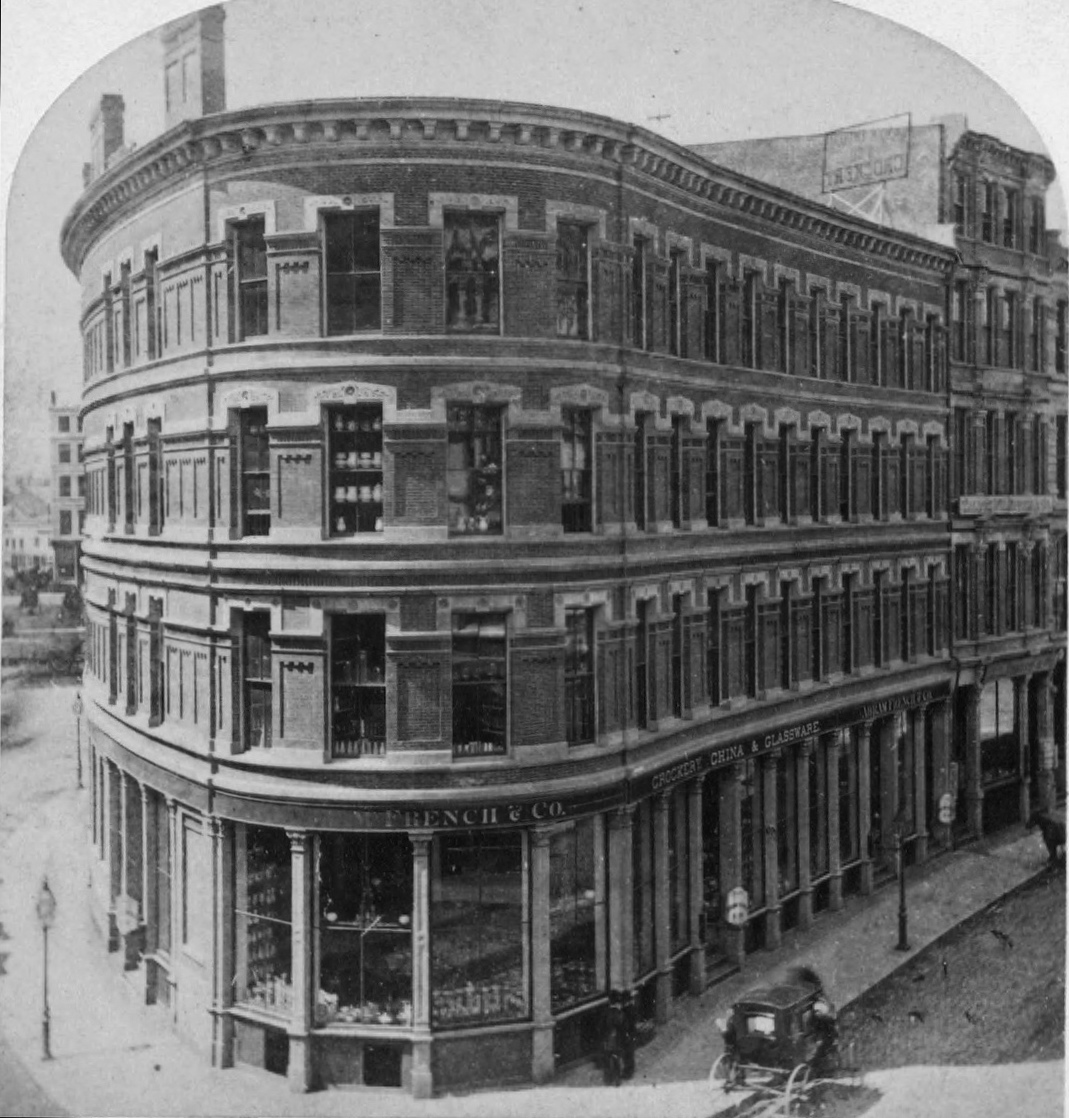
Abram French & Co., Franklin Street, Boston, ca.1879-1885

Abram French (1815–1884) was a crockery, glassware, and china dealer in 19th-century Boston, Massachusetts.

== Brief biography ==
French was born in Chelmsford, Massachusetts, on February 13, 1815, son of Ephraim and Rebecca (Abrams) French, and a descendant of William Abrams of Boston. He clerked for crockery merchant Samuel B. Pierce on Broad Street, Boston, beginning in 1831. He was later associated with the firm of Andrew T. Hall.

Around 1841 French sold "china, glass and earthen ware" from his own shop on Milk Street, near Batterymarch St. He later formed a partnership with John T. Wells as French, Wells & Co. (ca.1850 - ca.1858) on Milk St., along with Josiah B. Kilbourn (ca.1850), and Robert E. Newman (ca.1858-1861). With George W. Bassett, French formed the firm of Bassett, French & Co. (ca.1868), also on Milk Street. Junior partners included John T. Wells, Lemuel E. Caswell and Lewis G. Coburn. Then beginning in 1869, French re-formed his business as Abram French & Co., and remained as main partner until his death in 1884. Among his junior partners were John T. Wells, Lemuel E. Caswell, Lewis G. Coburn, S. Waldo French. His son, William Abram French (1843–1909), joined the firm in 1867. The firm billed itself as "importers of crockery, china and glass ware, French and Bohemian fancy goods, silver plated ware and cutlery, paper hangings."

He served as an Inspector for city Ward No. 9 in 1848. In 1853 he served as a judge in the exhibition of the Massachusetts Charitable Mechanic Association, held at Faneuil and Quincy Halls. French lived in Boston on Edinboro St., ca.1858-1868. Around 1873 he moved with his family to an estate once owned by Samuel Griswold Goodrich in Jamaica Plain. At some point he also owned the Warren house, 130 Warren Street, Roxbury.

In 1874, the business expanded to Chicago. After the old Milk St. shop burned in the fire of 1872, Abram French & Co. moved in 1879 to a new building on Franklin St. at the corner of Devonshire St. By all accounts the new shop presented merchandise in a tasteful and remarkably luxurious setting. The firm also exhibited specimens in the 1874 and 1881 exhibitions of the Massachusetts Charitable Mechanic Association.

As for recreational baseball, in August 1882, the Abram French & Co. baseball team lost to Jones, McDuffee & Stratton.

French died after a sudden illness on January 13, 1884, at his home in Jamaica Plain, and was buried in Forest Hills Cemetery. He had been married, with seven children. His son William A. French continued the crockery business in his name; as did his grandson, H.C. French (who also dealt chinaware in Chicago in the 1880s with French, Thomas & Co.).
