= Joseph Barrell (merchant) =

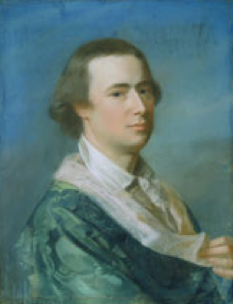
Portrait of Joseph Barrell, ca.1767, by John Singleton Copley (courtesy Worcester Art Museum)

Coat of Arms of Joseph Barrell

Joseph Barrell (1739–1804) was a merchant in Boston, Massachusetts, in the 18th century. During the American Revolution, he owned ships commissioned as privateers, such as the Vengeance, ca.1779. In 1792, Barrell was "elected to the board" of Massachusetts branch of the newly established Bank of the United States, along with "George Cabot, Jonathan Mason Jr., ... and Fisher Ames."

== Biography ==
As a merchant, Barrell imported goods from overseas. For instance, the Hannah, commanded by William Haydon, sailed in May 1780, probably from Amsterdam, loaded with cargo for Barrell in Boston: "German steel, ... china ware, earthen pots, house brushes, spices, linens, velvets, writing paper, children's toys (among the rest a furnished kitchen valued at over six florins), wafers, flat-irons, tea and tea-kettles and window-glass." Barrell's notable wealth also derived from his activities as "contractor to the French fleet."

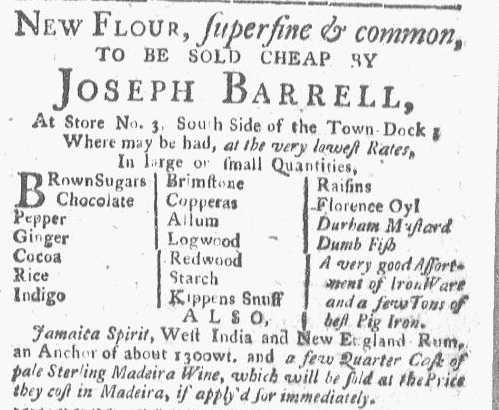
Newspaper advertisement, 1770. For sale: "Brown sugars, chocolate, pepper, ginger, cocoa, rice, indigo, brimstone, copperas, allum, logwood, redwood, starch, Kippens snuff, raisins, Florence oyl, Durham mustard, dumb fish," etc.

Around 1787, "a group of merchants led by Bostonian Joseph Barrell, having read the account of Captain Cook's third voyage, believed that great profits could be made by trading sea-otter furs, highly prized in China, for tea and other wares. They financed and arranged the venture of the ship Columbia Rediviva, commanded by John Kendrick, and the sloop Lady Washington, under Robert Gray, to sail around the Horn to the American northwest coast and trade for sea-otter furs, thence to Canton to trade the furs for tea and other wares, then homeward around the Cape of Good Hope and back to Boston. The Columbia thus became the first American vessel to circumnavigate the globe, leaving Boston on September 30, 1787, and returning on August 9, 1790. While this voyage was not profitable, the Columbia immediately set out on a second, more successful voyage under Gray which lasted until 1793. The voyages of the Columbia established the trade pattern for the Boston-northwest coast-China-Boston trade, spearheaded by Boston merchants."

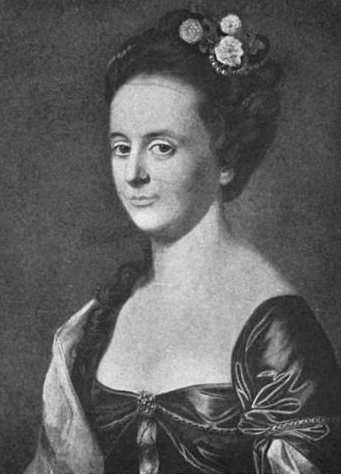
Portrait of Anna Pierce (wife of Barrell), 1766, by J.S. Copley

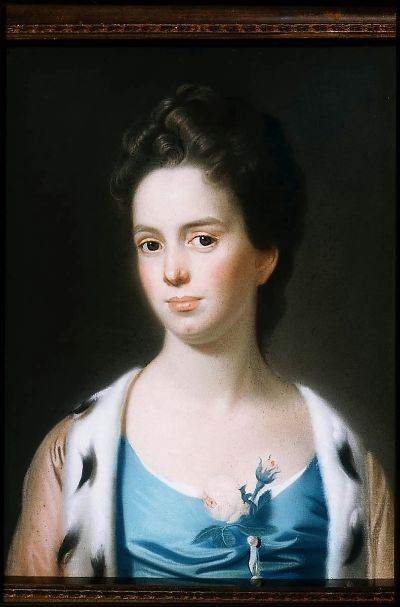
Portrait of Hannah Fitch (wife of Barrell), ca.1771, by J.S. Copley

In civic life, Barrell was appointed to an official town committee in 1789 to plan festivities in honor of George Washington's visit to Boston. Along with the Boston selectmen, the committee was charged with "devising the most suitable ways for the inhabitants of this town to express their affection and respect to President Washington."

In 1764 Barrell married Anna Pierce (ca.1744-1771), "known to her contemporaries as Nancy Barrell;" their children included Joseph Barrell Jr. (1765–1801). After Nancy died, he wed Hannah Fitch; children included Hannah Barrell (1773–1842). Joseph later married Sarah Webb.

=== Summer Street residence, Boston ===
"In 1784, Joseph Barrell, ... [an] immensely wealthy merchant, bought a house on Summer Street in Boston and built a lovely garden that was quite famous. By 1791, the Revd William Bentley was able to write in his diary: 'Was politely received at dinner by Mr Barrell.... His garden is beyond any example I have seen. A young grove is growing in the back ground, in the middle of which is a pond, decorated with four ships at anchor, & a marble figure in the centre. The Chinese manner is mixed with the European in the summer house which fronts the house, below the flower garden. Below is the hot house. In the apartment above are his flowers more freely admitted to the air, & above a summer house with every convenience. The squares are decorated with marble figures as large as life.'" The gardens extended "back to Franklin Place."

=== Pleasant Hill residence, Charlestown (built 1793) ===
"Wishing for more land to try new gardening styles and modern farming techniques, Mr Barrell purchased, over a period of several years, 211 acres of land across the Charles River in Charlestown (now Somerville), where he created a ferme ornée - a new concept which combined a working farm with a beautiful landscape."

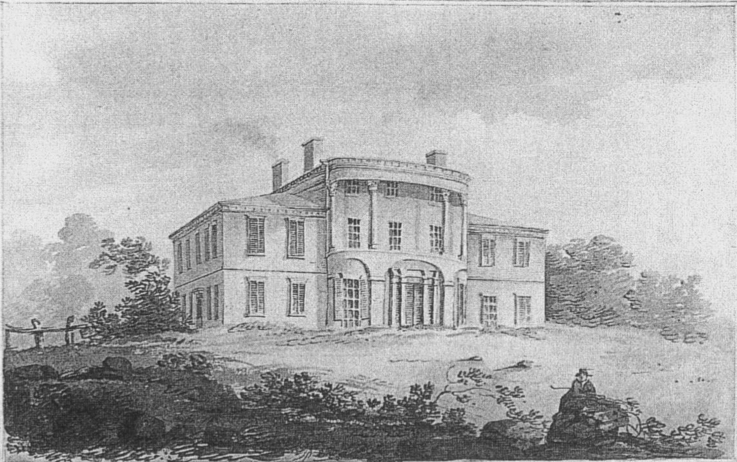
Barrell house, Charlestown

"In 1793, he asked Charles Bulfinch, a family friend, to design a country house on the side of a hill looking down across the river, over Boston, and on out into the harbour beyond. This was one of Bulfinch's first commissions, and the innovative design and resulting beauty of the house helped establish his reputation as an architect of great talent and creativity. The new place was called 'Pleasant Hill', and it too became very famous because of the magnificent house Bulfinch had created and the lovely gardens around it. The gardens here were terraced down the slope to a 'wilderness' of poplar trees and a small pond stocked with fish.' Anna (Eliot) Ticknor recalled visiting there as a child and described her experience this way: 'He gathered his friends ... to take fruit and coffee, and wander about the grounds. A vision of one such scene lives in my memory, but only a pencil like Watteau's could place it before the comprehension of others.... I walked, with my beautiful mother, through long alleys shaded by fine trees, with wide flower-beds on either hand, so radiant in color that one might almost have thought a rainbow had been thrown there.... Seen through the vista of sixty years a glow still lingers on the scene.'"

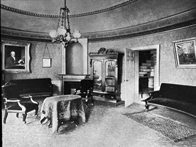
Interior of Barrell house, Charlestown

"It was Mr. Barrell's ambition to create an ideal country seat, adorned with all the accessories of lawns, trees, gardens, terraces, greenhouses, fish-ponds, dove-cotes, poultry-yard, stable, coach-house, a well-stocked barn, and an attractive boat-house. And here he was able to carry out his magnificent plan. All the resources of Nature and Art were combined to make Pleasant Hill -- as it was then called -- the most complete and sumptuous residence in the suburbs. The choicest plants were imported from Europe, and gardeners to take care of them. Elms and poplars lined the winding avenues in different directions."

He retired around 1794, passing on his business to his son, Joseph Barrell Jr. At Pleasant Hill Joseph Sr. experimented with gardening and agriculture, publishing his ideas. "In his "Reflections on Agriculture" of 1789, Barrell proposed that agriculture must be seen not only as the starting point of all civilization but as its culmination as well; he had retired from a prosperous career in the East India trade to devote all his energies to experimental agriculture and improvement of his estate. "'It is a fact somewhat remarkable,' he wrote, 'that men should have returned to the exercise of Agriculture, the first of the arts, only after they had successfully tried all the rest.'"

John Singleton Copley painted portraits of Barrell, and his wives Anna and Hannah. Barrell also commissioned furniture from cabinetmaker John Cogswell.

== See also ==
- Board Alley Theatre (Boston), supported by Barrell
- Columbia Rediviva, a ship partly owned by Barrell
- Federal Street Theatre (Boston), supported by Barrell
- Franklin Place (Boston), built on land owned by Barrell
