= Board Alley Theatre =

Coordinates: 42°21′22.31″N 71°3′29.74″W

The Board Alley Theatre (1792–1793) was an illegal theatre in Boston, Massachusetts, in the late 18th century. Also called the New Exhibition Room, it was located in Board Alley in the Financial District. Although some in town supported the theatre, others vehemently opposed it. Governor John Hancock forced it to close in June 1793.

== History ==
The "New Exhibition Room" was created by supporters of theatre in Boston, who had in 1791 unsuccessfully attempted to repeal a law of 1750 outlawing theatrical performances. "It was clear that if Boston was to have a theatre it must be in evasion or defiance of the law. ... An association was accordingly formed with this end in view, consisting of Joseph Russell, Dr. Charles Jarvis, Gen. Henry Jackson, Joseph Barrell and Joseph Russell, Jr. was appointed to erect a building that should be a theatre in everything except in name."

Charles Stuart Powell served as manager. The building "had a pit, a row of boxes forming three sides of a square, and a gallery ... accommodating about 500 persons." Shows typically consisted of two separate dramatic numbers—one serious, one comic—interspersed with slack rope, singing, and/or dancing. To avoid unnecessary provocation of the law, performances were sometimes advertised as "moral lectures" rather than "theatre."

== Events ==
- 1792
  - Oct. - "Tragical History of George Barnwell; or The London Merchant;" and "Mad Cap; or Lovers in Plenty."
  - Oct. - "Venice Preserved; or, a Plot Discovered;" and "The Duenno; or, the Jew Outwitted."
- 1793
  - April- Performances by "Madames Douvallier and Placide."
  - May - "Rosina: or, the Reapers;" and "Barnably Brittle: or, a Wife at her Wit's End;" and "The Four Brothers, or, Royal Clemency."
  - June - "Gray's Elegy;" "The Evening Brush;" "Le Devin du Village," ("a very celebrated French opera, never yet performed here"); and "between the acts of the opera, 'The Dwarf Dance' by Mr. Powell. End of the opera, a diverting ballette, called, 'The Bear Hunters."
