= Hawley Street (Boston) =

Street in Boston, Massachusetts

Coordinates: 42°21′22.31″N 71°3′29.74″W

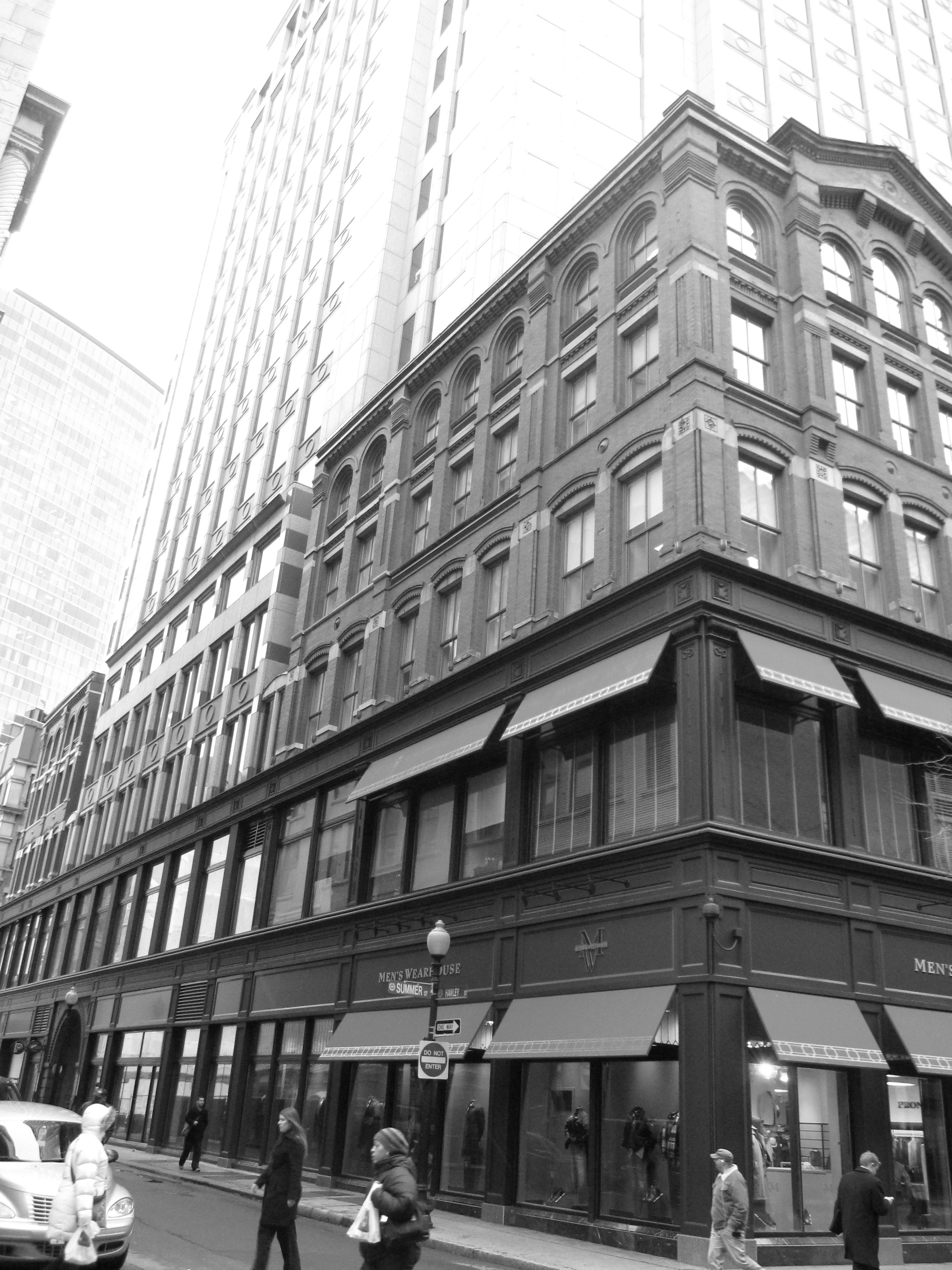
- Corner of Hawley and Summer Streets, 2010
- Interactive map of Hawley Street
- Location: Boston
- South end: Summer Street
- North end: Milk Street

Hawley Street of Boston, Massachusetts, is located in the Financial District between Milk and Summer Streets. Prior to 1799, it was called Bishop's Alley and briefly in the 1790s Board Alley.

== History ==
=== 17th century ===
According to historian Annie Haven Thwing, in 1645 the path that later would become Hawley Street was "laid out through the gardens towards the south windmill, between the houses of Amos Richardson and John Palmer on Summer Street." In the 17th century people referred to it as "'the lane in which the house of Gilbert the tanner stands,' 'a little lane formerly called Gilbert's lane.'"

=== 18th century ===
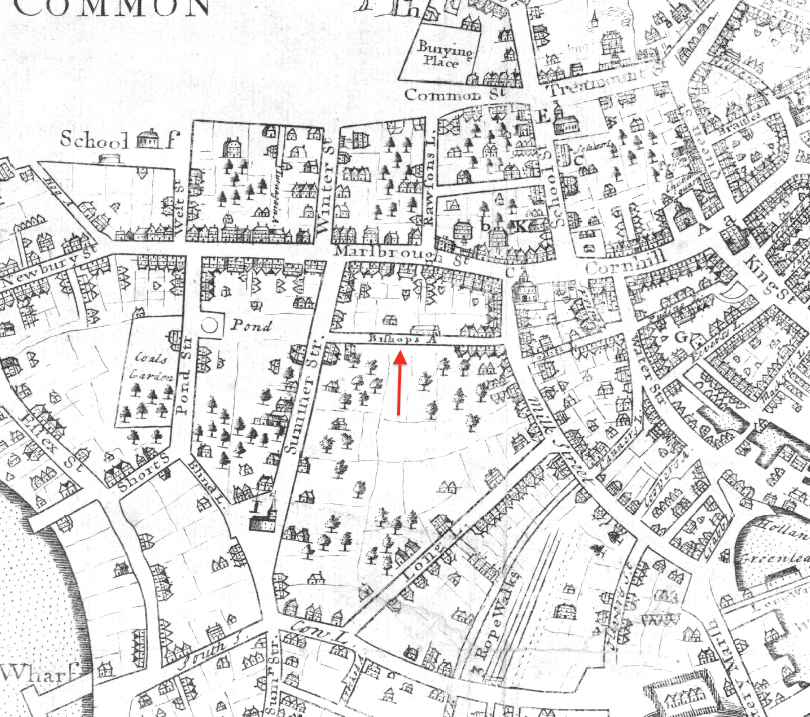
Detail of 1723 map of Boston, showing Bishop's Alley

After 1728, the lane was "a path through a pasture made by the worshippers of Trinity Church, who lived in King Street." Because the terrain consisted of a marshy bog, wooden planks were laid down to facilitate travel, and so it was referred to as "Board Alley."

In 1792, theatre enthusiasts organized an illegal theatre, the Board Alley Theatre, also called the "New Exhibition Room." With mixed popular opinion, governor John Hancock shut it down in June 1793.

=== 19th century ===
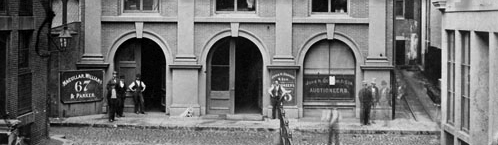
Hawley Street, Boston, c. 1870

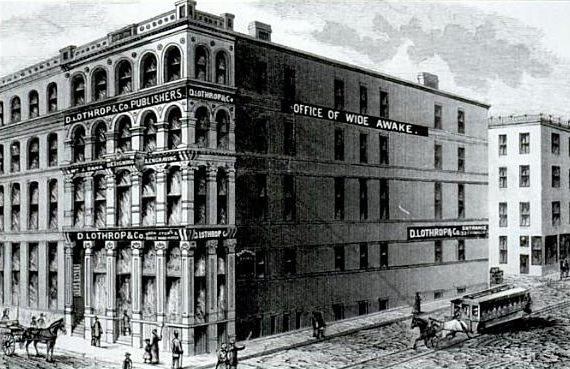
D. Lothrop Co., publisher, corner of Hawley and Franklin Streets, c. 1880s

Around the early 19th century, politicians James Sullivan and William Gray lived on the corner of Hawley and Summer Streets. In December 1810, a fire began at Stephen Soper's livery stable, spreading from Hawley to Milk Street, and burning the former home of Benjamin Franklin.

When Melvil Dewey lived in Boston in the 1870s, he served as an officer of the Spelling Reform Association, headquartered at 32 Hawley St.
